= History of Peru =

The history of Peru spans 15 millennia, extending back through several stages of cultural development along the country's desert coastline and in the Andes mountains. Peru's coast was home to the Norte Chico civilization, the oldest civilization in the Americas and one of the six cradles of civilization in the world. When the Spanish arrived in the sixteenth century, the highlands of southern Peru were the center of the Inca Empire, the largest and most advanced state in pre-Columbian America. After the conquest of the Incas, the Spanish Empire established a Viceroyalty with jurisdiction over most of its South American domains. Peru declared independence from Spain in 1821, but achieved independence only after the Battle of Ayacucho three years later.

Modern historiography of Peru divides its history into three main periods:

- A pre-Hispanic period, which lasts from the first civilizations of the region to the Spanish conquest of the Inca Empire.
- A viceregal or colonial period, which lasts from the aforementioned conquest to the Peruvian declaration of independence.
- A republican period, which lasts from the war of independence to the current day.

== Pre-Hispanic era ==
=== Pre-Columbian cultures ===
Andean civilizations of Peru

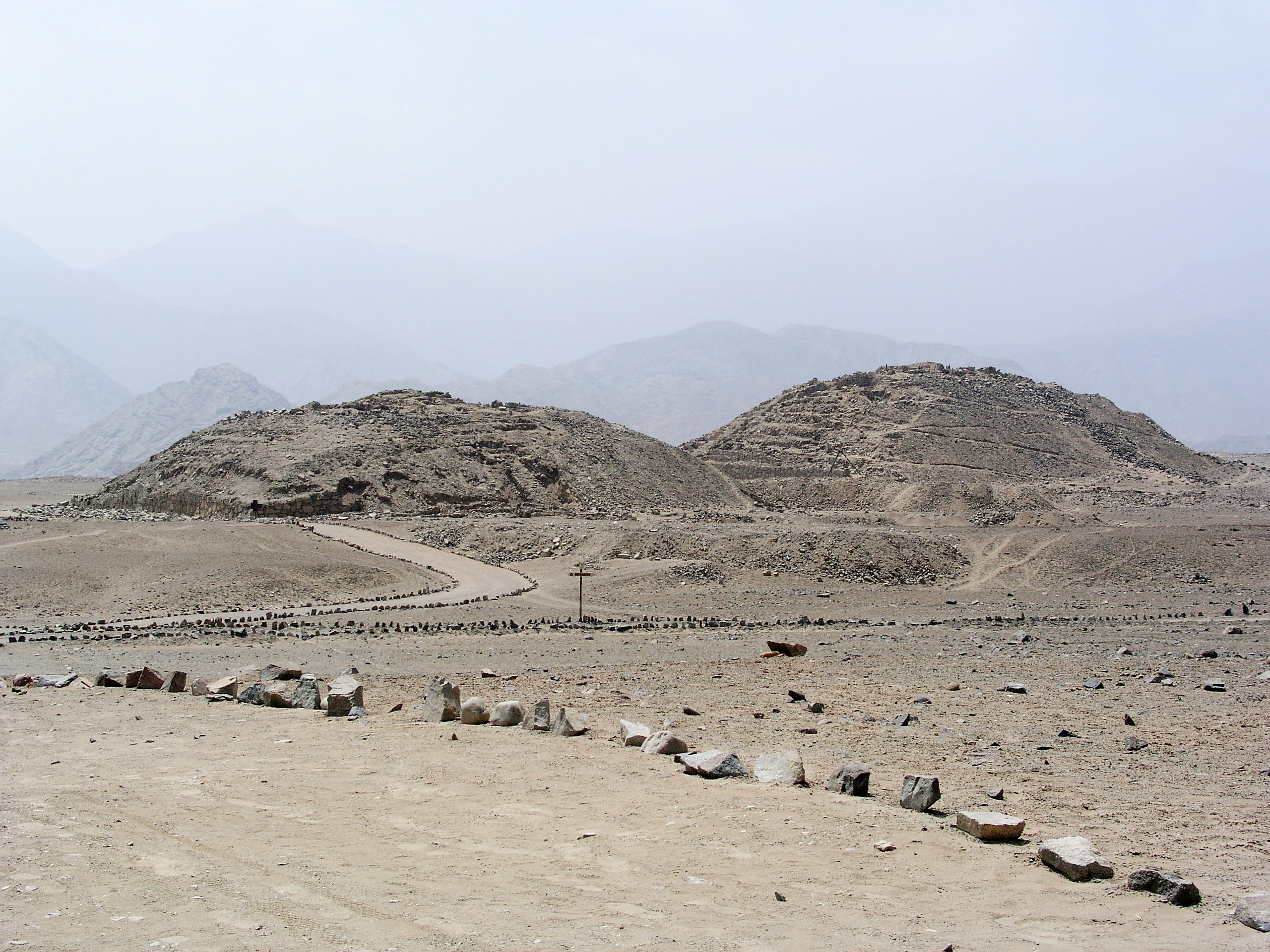
Norte Chico Caral pyramids in the arid Supe Valley, some 20 kilometers from the Pacific coast.

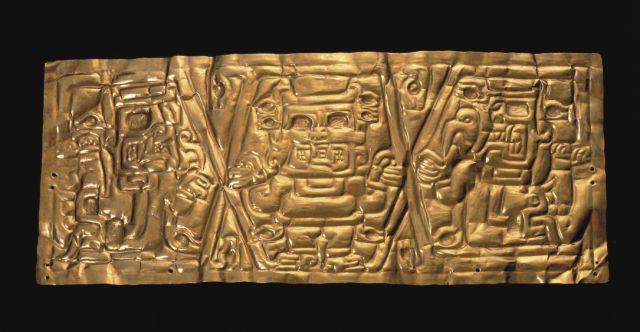
Chavin gold crown from the formative epoch, 1200–300 BCE, in the (Larco Museum Collection), Nazca Lines, created by the Nazca culture.

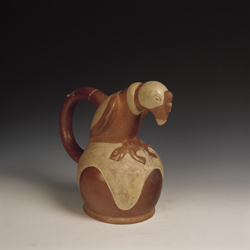
The Moche culture is world-renowned for its pottery, pictured is a condor from about 300 CE.

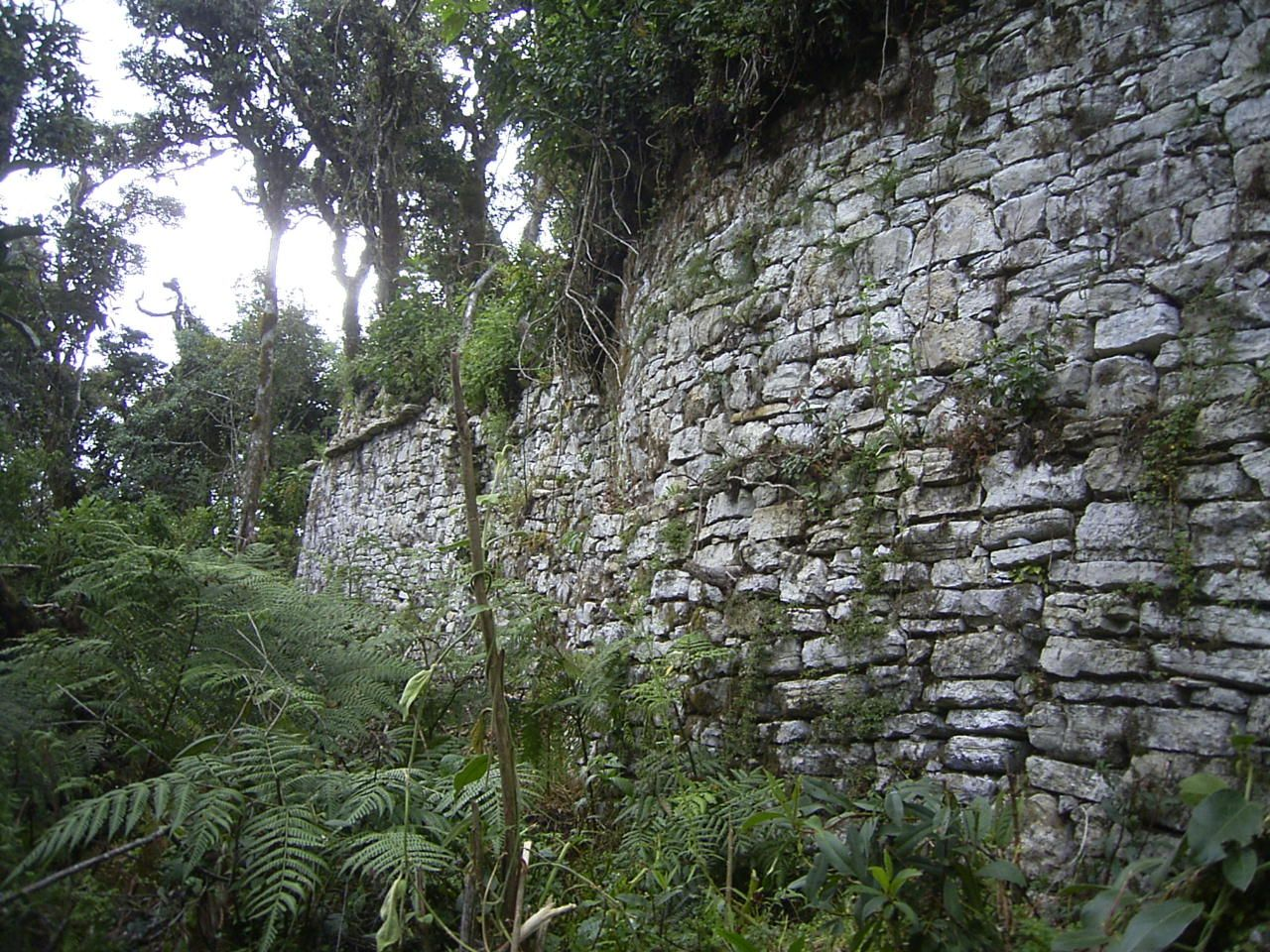
Walls of Soloco fortress, Chachapoyas, Peru.

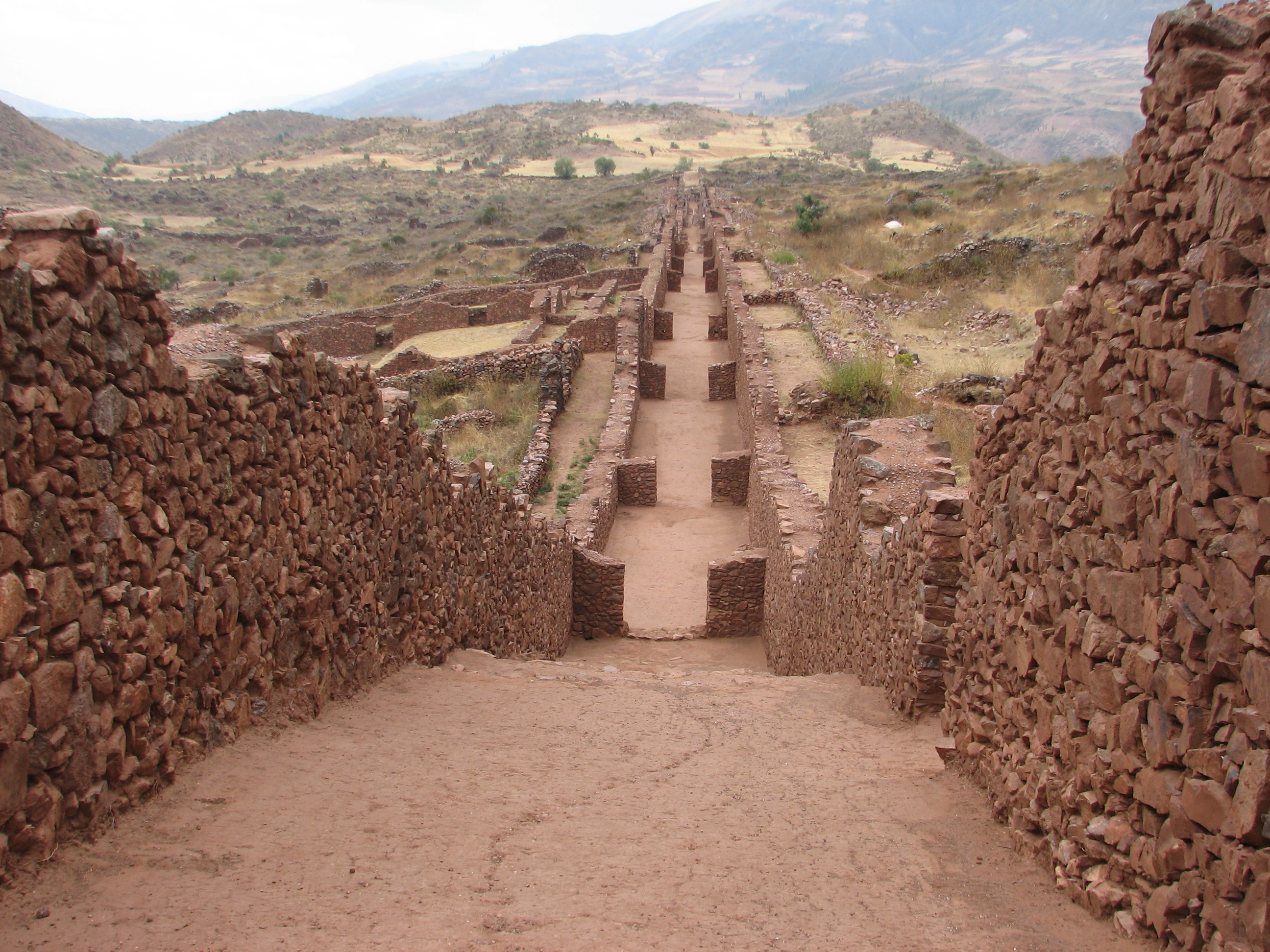
Pikillaqta administrative center, built by the Wari culture in Cusco.

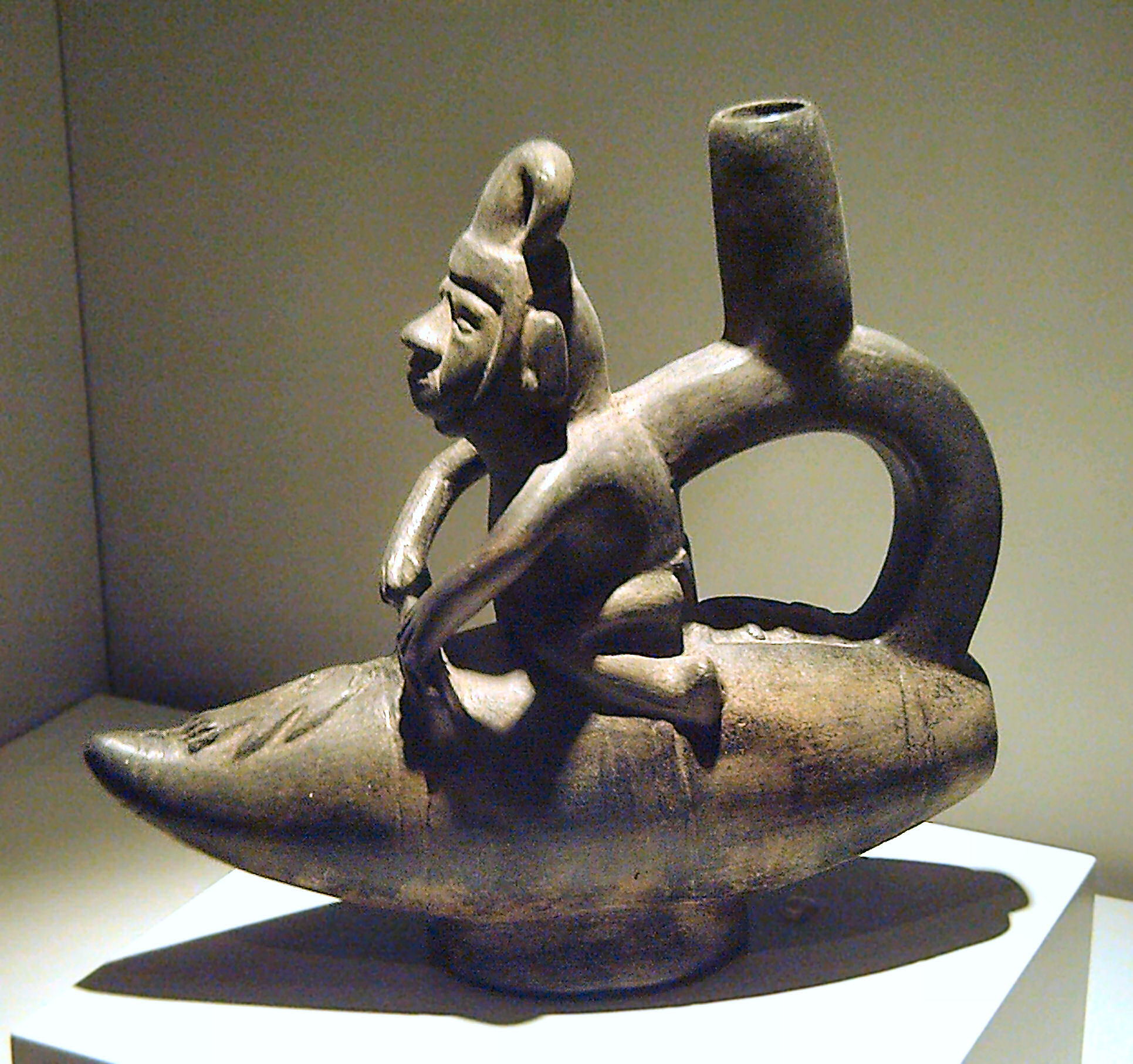
Chimú vessel representing a fisherman on a caballito de totora (1100–1400 CE).

Tiwanaku and Wari culture at its largest territorial extent, 950 CE.

Hunting tools dating back to more than 11,000 years ago have been found inside the caves of Pachacamac, Telarmachay, Junin, and Lauricocha. Some of the oldest civilizations appeared circa 6000 BC in the coastal provinces of Chilca and Paracas, and in the highland province of Callejón de Huaylas. Over the next three thousand years, inhabitants switched from nomadic lifestyles to cultivating land, as evidenced from sites such as Jiskairumoko, Kotosh, and Huaca Prieta. Cultivation of plants such as corn and cotton (Gossypium barbadense) began, as well as the domestication of animals such as the wild ancestors of the llama, the alpaca and the guinea pig, as seen in the 6000 BC dated Camelid relief paintings in the Mollepunko caves in Callalli. Inhabitants practiced spinning and knitting of cotton and wool, basketry, and pottery.

As these inhabitants became sedentary, farming allowed them to build settlements. As a result, new societies emerged along the coast and in the Andean mountains. The first known city in the Americas was Caral, located in the Supe Valley 200 km north of Lima. It was built in approximately 2500 BC.

The remnants of this civilization, also known as Norte Chico, consists of approximately 30 pyramidal structures built up in receding terraces ending in a flat roof; some of them measuring up to 20 meters in height. Caral is regarded as one of several cradles of civilization around the world where civilization emerged independent of other civilizations.

In the early 21st century, archeologists discovered new evidence of ancient pre-Ceramic complex cultures: three irrigation canals that were 5400 years old, and a possible fourth that was 6700 years old in the Zaña Valley in northern Peru. This was the evidence of community agricultural improvements that occurred at a much earlier date than previously believed.

In 2006, a research team discovered a 4200-year-old observatory at Buena Vista. They believe the observatory was related to the society's reliance on agriculture and understanding of the seasons. The site includes the oldest three-dimensional sculptures found thus far in South America. In 2007, the archaeologist Walter Alva and his team found a 4000-year-old temple with painted murals at Ventarrón, in the northwest Lambayeque region. The temple contained ceremonial offerings gained from an exchange with Peruvian jungle societies, as well as those from the Ecuadorian coast. Such finds show sophisticated, monumental construction requiring large-scale organization of labor, suggesting that hierarchical complex cultures arose in South America much earlier than previously thought.

Many other civilizations developed and were absorbed by the most powerful ones such as Kotosh; Chavin; Paracas; Lima; Nasca; Moche; Tiwanaku; Wari; Lambayeque; Chimu and Chincha, among others. The Paracas culture emerged on the southern coast around 300 BC. They are known for their use of vicuña fibers instead of just cotton to produce fine textiles—innovations that did not reach the northern coast of Peru until centuries later. Coastal cultures such as the Moche and Nazca flourished from about 100 BC to about AD 700: the Moche produced impressive metalwork, as well as some of the finest pottery seen in the ancient world, while the Nazca are known for their textiles and the enigmatic Nazca lines.

These coastal cultures eventually began to decline as a result of recurring el Niño floods and droughts. In consequence, the Huari and Tiwanaku, who dwelt inland in the Andes, became the predominant cultures of the region encompassing much of modern-day Peru and Bolivia. They were succeeded by powerful city-states such as Chancay, Sipán, and Cajamarca, and two empires: Chimor and Chachapoyas. These cultures developed relatively advanced techniques of cultivation, gold and silver craft, pottery, metallurgy, and knitting. Around 700 BC, they appear to have developed systems of social organization that were the precursors of the Inca civilization.

In the highlands, both the Tiahuanaco culture, near Lake Titicaca in both Peru and Bolivia, and the Wari culture, near the present-day city of Ayacucho, developed large urban settlements and wide-ranging state systems between 500 and 1000 AD.

While in the forested region of the Amazon, architectural excavations from the Chachapoya and the Wari culture allow for the evidence of complex societal presences prior to the conquest of Amazonas region by the Incan Empire.

As the Incan empire expanded, it defeated and assimilated Andean cultures like the Chachapoyas culture.

Archaeologists revealed the largest mass child sacrifice with more than 140 child skeletons and 200 Llamas dating to the Chimú culture. In September 2021, archaeologists announced the remains of eight 800-year-old bodies nearby ancient town of Chilca. Researchers think remains belong to the Chilca culture, which was apart from other pre-Hispanic cultures in the area.

In July 2025, a prehispanic urban center named Peñico, dating back approximately 3,500 years, was identified in northern Peru by a team of Peruvian and international archaeologists. Located approximately 600 m above sea level, the site consists of 18 structures including a circular ceremonial plaza, temples, and residential buildings constructed between 1800 and 1500 BC. According to the archaeologists, the settlement demonstrates that early Andean societies engaged in complex societal organization, serving as a cultural bridge between coastal and Amazonian communities during the early Formative stage.

=== Inca Empire (1438–1532) ===
Inca Empire

Inca expansion (1438–1533).

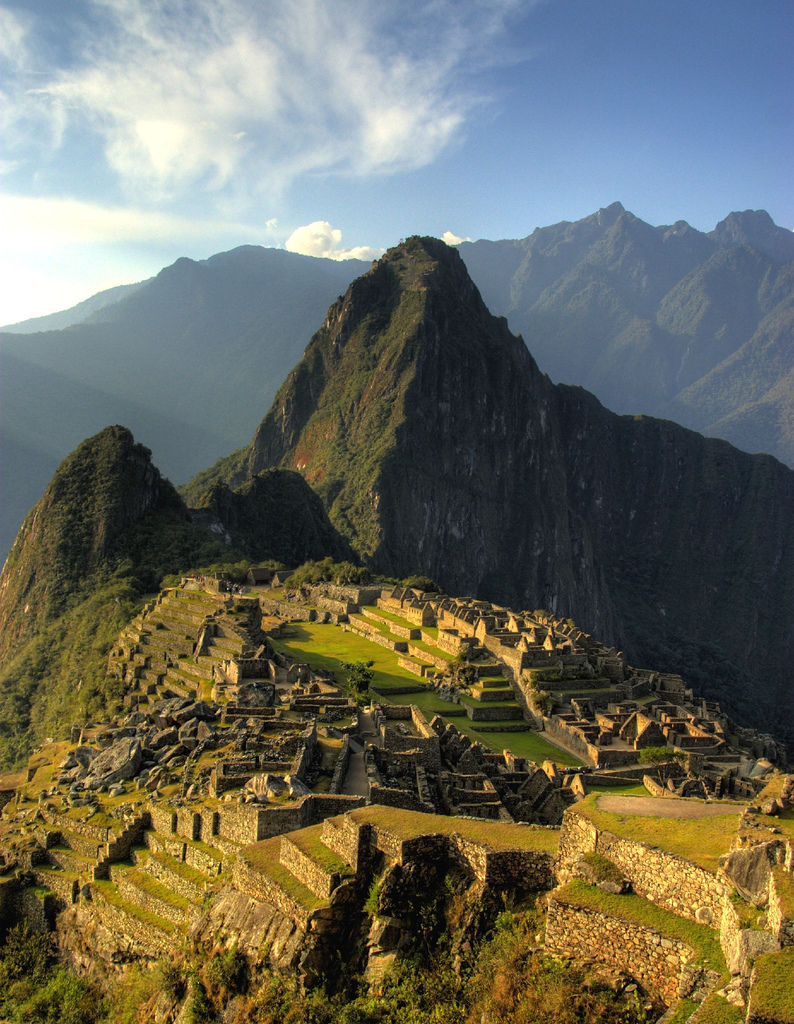
View of Machu Picchu built by the Incas.

The Incas built the largest and most advanced empire and dynasty of pre-Columbian America. The Tahuantinsuyo—which is derived from Quechua for "The Four United Regions"—reached its greatest extension at the beginning of the 16th century. It dominated a territory that included (from north to south) the southwest part of Ecuador, part of Colombia, the main territory of Peru, the northern part of Chile, and the northwest part of Argentina; and from east to west, from the southwest part of Bolivia to the Amazonian forests.

The empire originated from a tribe based in Cusco, which became the capital. Pachacuti wasn't the first Inca regent, but he was the first ruler to considerably expand the boundaries of the Cusco state. His offspring later ruled an empire by both violent invasions and peaceful conquests, that is, intermarriages among the rulers of small kingdoms and the current Inca ruler.

In Cuzco, the royal city was created to resemble a cougar; the head, the main royal structure, formed what is now known as Sacsayhuamán. The empire's administrative, political, and military center was located in Cusco. The empire was divided into four quarters: Chinchaysuyu, Antisuyu, Kuntisuyu and Qullasuyu.

The official language was Quechua, the language of a neighbouring tribe of the original tribe of the empire. Conquered populations—tribes, kingdoms, states, and cities—were allowed to practice their own religions and lifestyles, but had to recognize Inca cultural practices as superior to their own. Inti, the sun god, was to be worshipped as one of the most important gods of the empire. His representation on earth was the Inca ("Emperor").

The Tawantinsuyu was organized in dominions with a stratified society in which the ruler was the Inca. It was also supported by an economy based on the collective property of the land. The empire, being quite large, also had an impressive transportation system of roads to all points of the empire called the Inca Trail, and chasquis, message carriers who relayed information from anywhere in the empire to Cusco.

Machu Picchu (sometimes called the "Lost City of the Incas") is a well-preserved pre-Columbian Inca ruin located on a high mountain ridge above the Urubamba Valley, about 70 km (44 mi) northwest of Cusco. Elevation measurements vary depending on whether the data refer to the ruin or the extremity of the mountain; Machu Picchu tourist information reports the elevation as 2,350 m (7,711 ft)[1]. Forgotten for centuries by the outside world (although not by locals), it was brought back to international attention by Yale archaeologist Hiram Bingham III. Bingham, often cited as the inspiration for Indiana Jones, "scientifically rediscovered" the site in 1911 and brought international attention to the site with his best-selling book Lost City of the Incas. However, Agustín Lizárraga already reached the site on July 14, 1902 and left the inscription "A. Lizárraga 1902" on the Temple of Three Windows. Peru is pursuing legal efforts to retrieve thousands of artifacts that Bingham removed from the site and sold to the current owners at Yale University.

== Spanish era ==
=== Spanish conquest (1532–1572) ===
The word Peru may be derived from Birú, the name of a local ruler who lived near the Bay of San Miguel, Panama, in the early 16th century. When his possessions were visited by Spanish explorers in 1522, they were the southernmost part of the New World yet known to Europeans. Thus, when Francisco Pizarro explored the regions farther south, they came to be designated Birú or Peru. An alternative history is provided by the contemporary writer Inca Garcilasco de la Vega, son of an Inca princess and a conquistador. He says the name Birú was that of a common Indian happened upon by the crew of a ship on an exploratory mission for governor Pedro Arias de Ávila, and goes on to relate many more instances of misunderstandings due to the lack of a common language. The Spanish Crown gave the name legal status with the 1529 Capitulación de Toledo, which designated the newly encountered Inca Empire as the province of Peru. Under Spanish rule, the country adopted the denomination Viceroyalty of Peru, which became Republic of Peru after independence.

When the Spanish landed in 1531, Peru's territory was the nucleus of the highly developed Inca civilization. Centered at Cuzco, the Inca Empire extended over a vast region, stretching from southwest Ecuador to northern Chile.

Francisco Pizarro and his brothers were attracted by the news of a rich and fabulous kingdom. In 1532, they arrived in the country, which they called Peru. (The forms Biru, Pirú, and Berú are also seen in early records.) According to Raúl Porras Barrenechea, Peru is not a Quechuan nor Caribbean word, but Indo-Hispanic or hybrid.

In the years between 1524 and 1526, smallpox, introduced from the conquistadors in Panama and preceding the Spanish conquerors in Peru through transmission among natives, had swept through the Inca Empire. Smallpox caused the death of the Inca ruler Huayna Capac as well as most of his family including his heir, caused the fall of the Inca political structure and contributed to the civil war between the brothers Atahualpa and Huáscar. Taking advantage of this, Pizarro carried out a coup d'état. On 16 November 1532, while the Atahualpa's victorious army was in an unarmed celebration in Cajamarca, the Spanish lured Atahualpa into a trap during the Battle of Cajamarca. The well-armed 168 Spaniards killed thousands of barely armed Inca soldiers and captured the newly minted Inca ruler, causing a great consternation among the natives and conditioning the future course of the fight. When Huáscar was killed, the Spanish tried and convicted Atahualpa of the murder, executing him by strangulation.

For a period, Pizarro maintained the ostensible authority of the Inca, recognizing Túpac Huallpa as the Sapa Inca after Atahualpa's death. But the conqueror's abuses made this facade too obvious. Spanish domination consolidated itself as successive indigenous rebellions were bloodily repressed. By 23 March 1534, Pizarro and the Spanish had re-founded the Inca city of Cuzco as a new Spanish colonial settlement.

Establishing a stable colonial government was delayed for some time by native revolts and bands of the Conquistadores (led by Pizarro and Diego de Almagro) fighting among themselves. A long civil war developed, from which Pizarro emerged victorious at the Battle of Las Salinas. In 1541, Pizarro was assassinated by a faction led by Diego de Almagro II (El Mozo), and the stability of the original colonial regime was shaken up in the ensuing civil war.

Pizarro and his followers in Lima in 1535

Despite this, the Spaniards did not neglect the colonizing process. Its most significant milestone was the foundation of Lima in January 1535, from which the political and administrative institutions were organized. The new rulers instituted the encomienda system, by which the Spanish extracted tribute from the local population, part of which was forwarded to Seville in return for converting the natives to Christianity. Title to the land itself remained with the king of Spain. As governor of Peru, Pizarro used the encomienda system to grant virtually unlimited authority over groups of native Peruvians to his soldier companions, thus forming the colonial land-tenure structure. The indigenous inhabitants of Peru were now expected to raise Old World cattle, poultry, and crops for their landlords. Resistance was punished severely.

The necessity of consolidating Spanish royal authority over these territories led to the creation of a Real Audiencia (Royal Audience). In 1542 or 1543, the Viceroyalty of Peru (Virreinato del Perú) was established, with authority over most of Spanish-ruled South America. Colombia, Ecuador, Panama (after 1571) and Venezuela were split off as the Viceroyalty of New Granada (Virreinato de Nueva Granada) in 1717, and Argentina, Bolivia, Paraguay, and Uruguay were set up as the Viceroyalty of the Río de la Plata in 1776).

After Pizarro's death, there were numerous internal problems, and Spain finally sent Blasco Núñez Vela to be Peru's first viceroy in 1544. He was later killed by Pizarro's brother, Gonzalo Pizarro, but a new viceroy, Pedro de la Gasca, eventually managed to restore order. He captured and executed Gonzalo Pizarro.

A census taken by the last Quipucamayoc indicated that there were 12 million inhabitants of Inca Peru; 45 years later, under viceroy Toledo, the census figures amounted to only 1,100,000 Inca. Historian Noble David Cook estimates that their population decreased from an estimated 9 million in the 1520s to around 600,000 in 1620 mainly because of infectious diseases. While the attrition was not an organized attempt at genocide, the results were similar. Scholars now believe that, among the various contributing factors, epidemic disease such as smallpox (unlike the Spanish, the Amerindians had no immunity to the disease) was the overwhelming cause of the population decline of the American natives. Inca cities were given Spanish Christian names and rebuilt as Spanish towns centered around a plaza with a church or cathedral facing an official residence. A few Inca cities like Cuzco retained native masonry for the foundations of their walls. Other Inca sites, like Huanuco Viejo, were abandoned for cities at lower altitudes more hospitable to the Spanish.

=== Viceroyalty of Peru (1542–1824) ===
Colonial tapestry, late 17th or early 18th century. It was woven by indigenous weavers for a Spanish client, incorporating then-fashionable Chinese imagery.

Plan of the City of Kings (Lima), 1674.

In 1542, the Spanish Crown created the Viceroyalty of Peru, which was reorganized after the arrival of Viceroy Francisco de Toledo in 1572. He put an end to the indigenous Neo-Inca State in Vilcabamba and executed Tupac Amaru I. He also sought economic development through commercial monopoly and mineral extraction, mainly from the silver mines of Potosí. He reused the Inca mita, a forced labor program, to mobilize native communities for mining work. This organization transformed Peru into the principal source of Spanish wealth and power in South America.

The town of Lima, founded by Pizarro on 18 January 1535 as the "Ciudad de Reyes" (City of Kings), became the seat of the new viceroyalty. It grew into a powerful city, with jurisdiction over most of Spanish South America. Precious metals passed through Lima on their way to the Isthmus of Panama and from there to Seville, Spain for the Atlantic route. For the Pacific, it passed to Mexico and disembarked from the port of Acapulco and eventually arrived at the Philippines. By the 18th century, Lima had become a distinguished and aristocratic colonial capital, seat of a university and the chief Spanish stronghold in the Americas. Peru was thus wealthy and highly populated. Sebastian Hurtado de Corcuera, governor of Panama settled Zamboanga City in the Philippines, where residents now speak a Spanish Creole, by employing soldiers and colonists recruited from the towns of Peru.

Nevertheless, throughout the eighteenth century, further away from Lima in the provinces, the Spanish did not have complete control. The Spanish could not govern the provinces without the help of local elite. This local elite, who governed under the title of Curaca, took pride in their Incan history. Additionally, throughout the eighteenth century, indigenous people rebelled against the Spanish. Two of the most important rebellions were that of Juan Santos Atahualpa in 1742 in the Andean jungle provinces of Tarma and Jauja, which expelled the Spanish from a large area, and the Rebellion of Túpac Amaru II in 1780 around the highlands near Cuzco. In 1780, direct trade between Manila, Philippines at Asia; and Callao, Peru; in South America, was officially approved by the Spanish King, and organized by the Royal Philippine Company, leading to much immigration of Filipinos to Peru and Peruvians to the Philippines.

At the time, an economic crisis was developing due to creation of the Viceroyalties of New Granada and Rio de la Plata (at the expense of its territory), the duty exemptions that moved the commercial center from Lima to Caracas and Buenos Aires, and the decrease of the mining and textile production. This crisis proved favorable for the indigenous rebellion of Túpac Amaru II and determined the progressive decay of the Viceroyalty of Peru.

In 1808, Napoleon invaded the Iberian Peninsula and took the king, Ferdinand VII, hostage. Later in 1812, the Cadíz Cortes, the national legislative assembly of Spain, promulgated a liberal Constitution of Cadiz. These events inspired emancipating ideas between the Spanish Criollo people throughout the Spanish America. In Peru, the Creole rebellion of Huánuco arose in 1812 and the rebellion of Cuzco arose between 1814 and 1816. Despite these rebellions, the Criollo oligarchy in Peru remained mostly Spanish loyalist, which accounts for the fact that the Viceroyalty of Peru became the last redoubt of the Spanish dominion in South America.

=== Wars of independence (1811–1824) ===
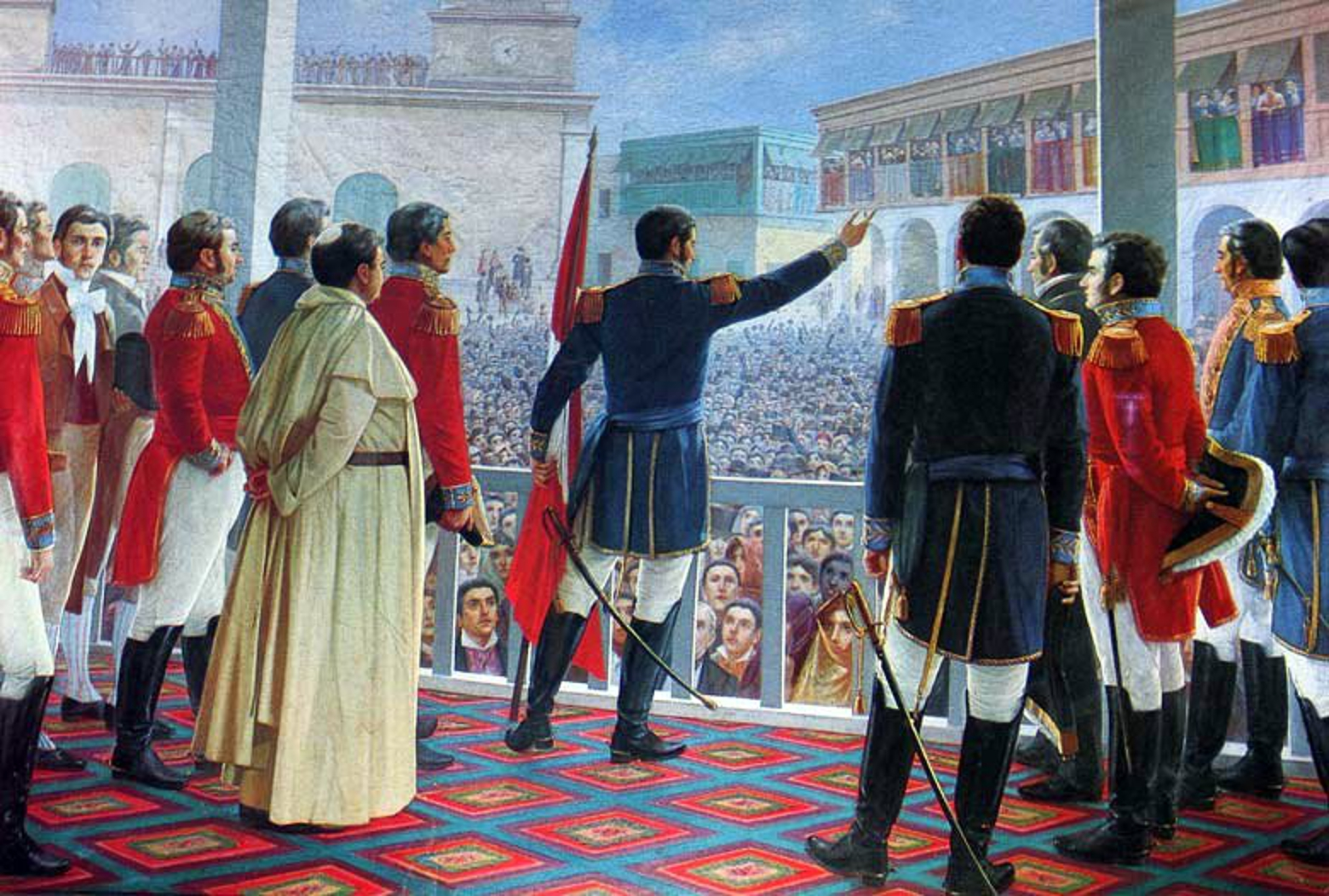
José de San Martín's proclamation of the independence of Peru on July 28, 1821, in Lima, Peru. Painting by Juan Lepiani

Peru's movement toward independence was launched by an uprising of Spanish-American landowners and their forces, led by José de San Martín of Argentina and Simón Bolívar of Venezuela. San Martín, who had displaced the royalists of Chile after the Battle of Chacabuco, and who had disembarked in Paracas in 1819, led the military campaign of 4,200 soldiers. The expedition, which included warships, was organized and financed by Chile which sailed from Valparaíso in August 1820. San Martin proclaimed the independence of Peru in Lima on 28 July 1821, with the words "... From this moment on, Peru is free and independent, by the general will of the people and the justice of its cause that God defends. Long live the homeland! Long live freedom! Long live our independence!". San Martín received the title of "Protector of Peruvian Freedom" in August 1821 after partially liberating Peru from the Spanish.

On 26 and 27 July 1822, Bolívar held the Guayaquil Conference with San Martín and attempted to decide the political fate of Peru. San Martín opted for a constitutional monarchy, whilst Bolivar (Head of the Northern Expedition) favored a republic. Nonetheless, they both followed the notion that it was to be independent of Spain. Following the interview, San Martin abandoned Peru on 22 September 1822 and left the whole command of the independence movement to Simon Bolivar.

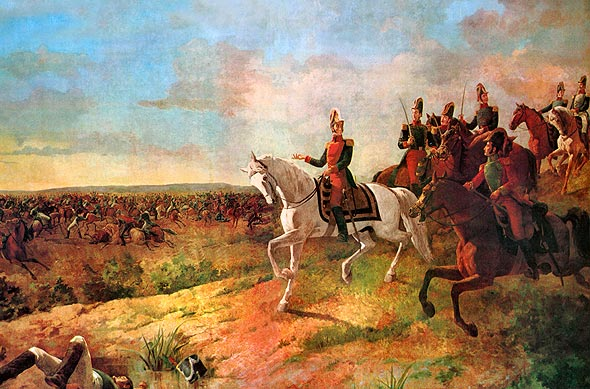
Battle of Junín, 6 August 1824

The Peruvian congress named Bolivar dictator of Peru on 10 February 1824, which allowed him to reorganize the political and military administration completely. Assisted by general Antonio José de Sucre, Bolívar decisively defeated the Spanish cavalry at the Battle of Junín on 6 August 1824. Sucre destroyed the still numerically superior remnants of the Spanish forces at Ayacucho on 9 December 1824. The war would not end until the last royalist holdouts surrendered the Real Felipe Fortress in 1826.

The victory brought about political independence, but there remained indigenous and mestizo supporters of the monarchy and in Huanta Province, they rebelled in 1825–28, which is known as the war of the punas or the Huanta Rebellion.

Spain made futile attempts to regain its former colonies, such as the Battle of Callao (1866), and only in 1879 finally recognized Peruvian independence.

== Republican era ==
The republican era of Peru is usually considered to begin after the declaration of independence or the Battle of Ayacucho in 1824, and its periods are modelled after Jorge Basadre's work, Historia de la República del Perú.

=== Beginnings of the Republic (1824–1836) ===
After the Battle of Ayacucho, Spanish General José de Canterac signed the final capitulation of the Royalist Army in Peru. Despite the Spanish capitulation, relations between both states would not be established until 1879. During this era, the First Militarism (Spanish: Primer Militarismo), a period where several military figures held control of the country, started in 1827, with José de La Mar's presidency.

==== Spanish resistance ====
By the time the capitulation had been signed, the royalist forces in Peru occupied the southern provinces, slowly surrendering to the rebels. Despite the apparent end of the successful patriot campaigns, two Spanish figures refused to accept the capitulation and established themselves in Callao and Upper Peru: José Ramón Rodil and Pedro Antonio Olañeta, respectively. Additionally, a resistance in Ayacucho led by Antonio Huachaca would remain until its dissolution in 1839.

Olañeta, who established himself in Potosí, soon became the focus of a campaign commanded by Antonio José de Sucre. The campaign began in January and ended in April 1825, with the battle of Tumusla of April 1, where Olañeta was fatally wounded after being shot and died the day after.

Rodil, on the other hand, established himself in the Real Felipe Fortress of the port of Callao, near Lima, expecting Spanish reinforcements that would never come. The capital city itself had been retaken by Royalist troops until the arrival of reinforcements for the Patriot side. This led to Rodil's forces being besieged from December 5, 1824, to January 23, 1826, and becoming the final Spanish stronghold in South America. The deteriorating conditions of the besieged fortress eventually led to the surrender of Rodil and his forces due to their inability to continue the siege alive.

==== Bolivarian era ====
Simón Bolívar, who became dictator of Peru on January 17, 1824, notified the Constituent Congress of his resignation of his office, which was not accepted, instead being extended until 1827. During this time, he travelled to southern and Upper Peru, and the final flag and coat of arms of Peru was established on February 25, 1825, the latter designed by José Gregorio Paredes.

Upper Peru, whose public opinion was split between joining Peru or the United Provinces, soon saw a new train of thought establish itself, which suggested that the region become an independent state. Soon, the State of Upper Peru was established as an independent state, later becoming Bolivia. Bolívar was in charge of the constitution, as well as Peru's and later Colombia's. The similarities between the constitutions was related to his desire to establish a federation in America, which led to the Congress of Panama and later the anti-Bolivarian sentiment that led to him leaving Peru on September 3, 1826. A year later, the Constituent Congress was dissolved.

==== Conflict with Bolivia and Colombia ====
José de La Mar became president of Peru on August 22, 1827, having been chosen by the new Congress. Under his presidency, Peru went to war with Bolivia and Colombia due to the perceived disadvantage that Peru saw itself in due to being surrounded by Bolivarian countries.

A Peruvian invasion of Bolivia headed by Agustín Gamarra began on May 1, 1828. The Peruvian Army soon occupied the Bolivian department of La Paz, established a pro-Peruvian government and successfully deported the Colombian troops stationed in the country via ships paid by Bolivia that departed from the Peruvian port of Arica.

The events in Bolivia led to war between Peru and Colombia, which ended with the Battle of Tarqui on February 27, 1829, after which an armistice was signed. The breach of the armistice almost led to a continuation of the war, an event that was prevented by the political instability in Peru that led to the deposition of La Mar by Agustín Gamarra, who signed a peace treaty with Colombia.

==== Later instability ====
A civil war broke out in 1834, by revolutionaries who opposed Orbegoso as a successor of Gamarra. Orbegoso proved popular with the population, and the revolution was eventually repressed, with Orbegoso, who had established himself in the Real Felipe Fortress, returning to Lima on May 3, 1834.

Desires to unite the regions of lower and upper Peru eventually led to the Salaverry-Santa Cruz War, which itself led to the establishment of the Republic of South Peru on March 17, 1836, and the Republic of North Peru on August 11, 1836, with Andrés de Santa Cruz appointing himself the Supreme Protector of both states. The establishment of these states later ended with the establishment of the Peru–Bolivian Confederation.

==== Peru-Bolivian Confederation (1836–1839) ====
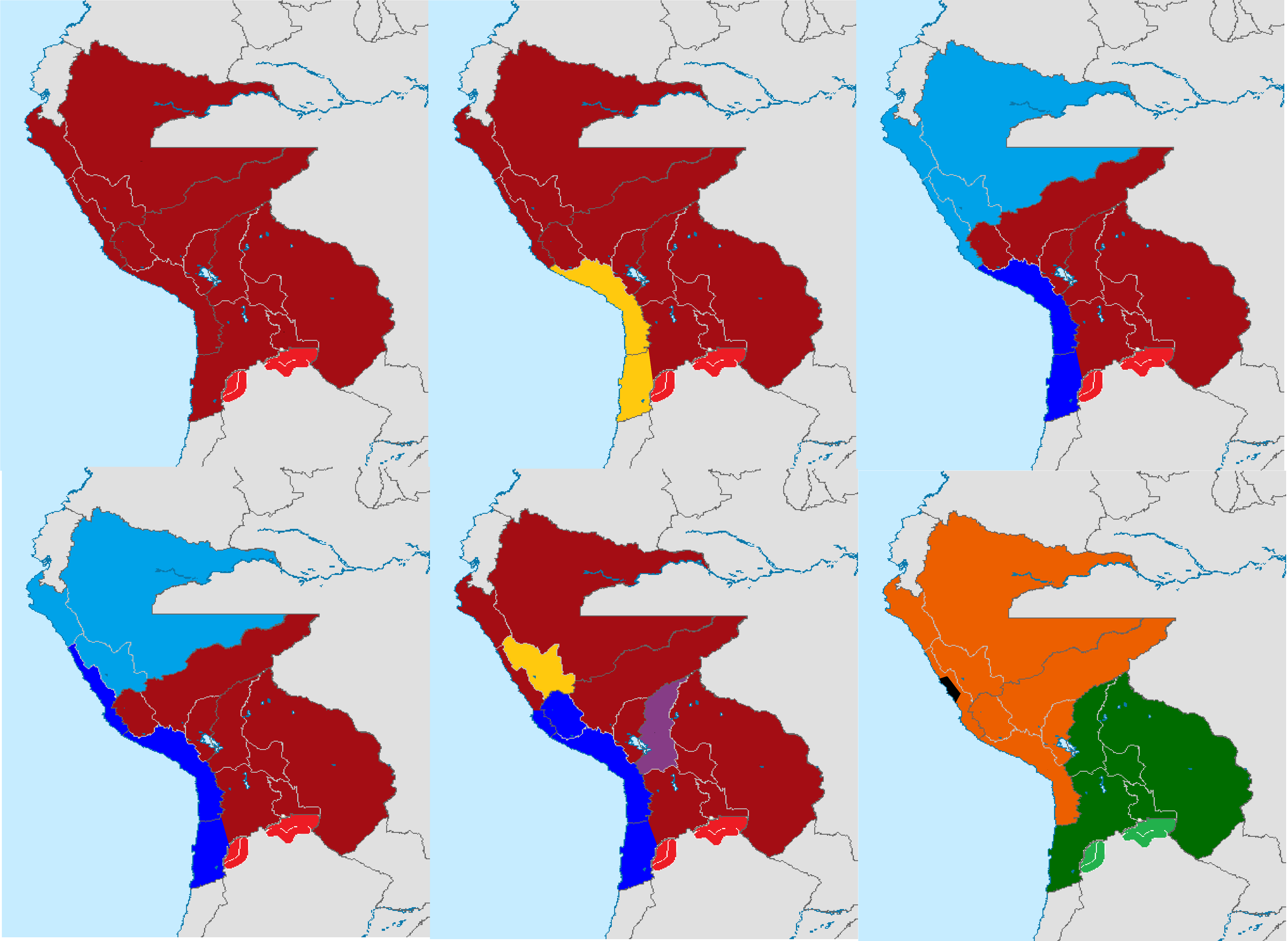
Dissolution of Peru-Bolivia: Peru-Bolivia Controlled by the United Restoration Army First Provisional Government of Peru Northern Peruvian Republic Second Provisional Government of Peru Provisional Government of Bolivia New Peruvian State New Bolivian State Controlled by the United Restoration Army during the restoration De facto borders after the dissolution Disputed between Peru-Bolivia and Argentina Disputed between Bolivia and Argentina

The establishment of the Peru-Bolivian Confederation soon led to war, as Peruvian exiles, as well as neighboring Chile and Argentina opposed the existence of the state.

Peruvian opposition manifested itself in the War of the Confederation, which included the secession of North Peru, whose president, Luis de Orbegoso, established the Restoration Army of Peru that was defeated at the Battle of Guías; and the establishment by Peruvian exiles in Chile of the United Restoration Army, which fought against the confederation until its defeat in the Battle of Yungay, which led to its dissolution.

The conflict against the confederation also saw a southern theater, known as the War of Tarija, which was the conflict between Argentina and the Confederation over the territory of Tarija. Argentina annexed the territory as a result of the war, later being returned to Bolivia in March 1839.

In addition to the conflict in Tarija, the conflict also began the Second Iquicha War, which led to the disestablishment of the royalist autonomy—that had seen conflict a decade earlier—led by Huachaca, who fled to the Apurímac jungle, choosing to remain there while denouncing the republicans as the "antichrists".

=== Restoration (1839–1841) ===
After the demise in the War of the Confederation, the states of Peru and Bolivia were re-established as independent and separate from each other. The Constituent Congress meeting in Huancayo ratified Agustín Gamarra as Provisional President on August 15, 1839, while the new Constitution was being written. Once this was approved, and after a general election, Gamarra was proclaimed Constitutional President of Peru on July 10, 1840.

During this second government, treaties were signed with Brazil, the Nuestra Señora de Guadalupe school opened its doors, and El Comercio began its publications in 1839. Gamarra followed the same guidelines as his first government, being authoritarian and conservative, as circumstances required, after several years of civil war. He faced the challenge of pacifying the country, having to face the "regenerative" revolution that Manuel Ignacio de Vivanco led in Arequipa, where he proclaimed himself Supreme Chief of the Republic, in January 1841. To combat it, Gamarra sent his war minister, Ramón Castilla, who after first suffering a defeat in Cachamarca, triumphed over the Vivanquistas in Cuevillas. After his defeat, Vivanco fled to Bolivia.

Gamarra's desire to unite Bolivia and Peru dovetailed into an attempt to annex Bolivia that ultimately failed and turned into a protracted war. After reaching La Paz without resistance, Gamarra participated in the Battle of Ingavi, where he was killed in action. In the aftermath of this battle, Bolivia occupied the south of Peru until a Peruvian resistance was established, which led to a counterattack that was ultimately successful due to the limited number of Bolivian troops.

The two nations signed the Treaty of Puno on June 7, 1842, officially ending the war. Both countries agreed to remain as separate sovereign states and the retreat of troops in Peruvian territory was accomplished eight days later. Bolivia unconditionally renounced all claims in southern Peruvian territory, but nevertheless, the treaty did not manage to solve the border problem or the unionist movement between the two states.

The conflict ended with a return to the situation before the war. Despite this, Peruvian historiography argues that the victories seen in all the battles in Peruvian soil overshadow the defeat at Ingavi, leaving Peru in a more favorable outcome after the end of the war.

=== Military anarchy (1841–1845) ===
After Gamarra's death, Manuel Menéndez was recognized as provisional president. However, several military leaders became involved in a struggle for power: in the north, Juan Crisóstomo Torrico; in the south, Antonio Gutiérrez de La Fuente, Domingo Nieto and Juan Francisco de Vidal; and in Arequipa, Manuel Ignacio de Vivanco. Menéndez could not maintain power, as he was deposed by Torrico.

The anarchy led to the Peruvian Civil War of 1843–1844. By then, a government had been established by Vivanco, known as the Directory (Spanish: el Directorio). In contrast to this new government, a rebellion led by Domingo Nieto also sought to establish itself as the legitimate government. On September 3, 1843, the revolutionaries constituted a Provisional Government Junta of the Free Departments in Cuzco (Spanish: Junta de Gobierno Provisional de los Departamentos Libres), whose presidency was assumed by Domingo Nieto, who would be succeeded by Castilla after his death in 1844.

The civil war reached its end in the Battle of Carmen Alto of July 22, 1844, between Vivanco and Castilla's troops near Arequipa. After the defeat of Vivanco's troops, Vivanco himself arrived in Callao on July 27, being arrested by Prefect of Lima, Domingo Elías and exiled to Chile a few days later. With Castilla as the country's new leader, the anarchy came to an end.

=== "Fallacious prosperity" and the Guano Era (1845–1866) ===
After Castilla assumed the presidency of Peru, Peru entered a period of peace and economic prosperity, as the anarchic period had been put to an end, and Peru established a virtual international monopoly in the trade of guano. This allowed the government to repay its external debt, earning it international economic prestige. Several reforms, including education, were put into place, and the economy continued to grow until the 1860s.

Castilla was replaced by his advisor José Rufino Echenique in 1851, who continued his work, as the economy continued to grow. His government was of a conservative nature, which eventually led to conflict with the liberals. On October 23, 1851, Peru signed its first border treaty with Brazil, where it ceded territory in the Amazon rainforest disputed by Ecuador, who claimed the territory as its own.

==== Liberal Revolution (1854–1855) ====
Echenique was accused of corruption by its opponents, with some pointing out a lavish party that had been hosted by his wife, Victoria Tristán, as proof of his reckless spending, which appeared as an insult to the general poverty of the country. Others, such as Domingo Elías, made the accusation on the basis of Echenique being "too generous" regarding his payment of the country's external debt. Amid the growing conflict between the conservative government and the liberal opposition, the Liberal Revolution of 1854 broke out, with the liberals, soon headed by Castilla, defeating the government at the Battle of La Palma and Castilla being reinstated as president.

Castilla summoned a National Convention whose representatives were elected by direct and universal suffrage, settling on July 14, 1855. This Convention authored the Liberal Constitution of 1856. Dissatisfied with the liberal regime that was being established, the conservatives rose up in Arequipa, led by the caudillo Manuel Ignacio de Vivanco, an old rival of Castilla. A bloody civil war broke out, culminating in the triumph of Castilla after the capture of Arequipa on March 7, 1858.

==== Ecuadorian–Peruvian War (1857–1860) ====
Between 1857 and 1860 a war broke out against Ecuador over disputed territories in the Amazon that Ecuador had allegedly sold to British companies to pay for its foreign debt. The Peruvian victory in the war prevented the Ecuadorian claims to settle in the area.

==== War with Spain ====
In 1865, civil war broke out, waged by the forces headed by Colonel Mariano Ignacio Prado against the government of President Juan Antonio Pezet, due to the weakness that he was alleged to have shown in solving the crisis caused by the Spanish occupation of the Chincha Islands, most specifically due to the signing of the Vivanco–Pareja Treaty. As a result, Pezet was overthrown, and Prado declared an alliance against Spain, alongside Chile, Bolivia and Ecuador, also declaring war on Spain. On May 2, 1866, the Battle of Callao took place, and a peace treaty was signed in 1879. The expenses caused by the war severely affected the Peruvian economy, which began to decline.

=== Economic and international crisis (1866–1884) ===
With Prado as provisional and later constitutional president, a new constitution was adopted. Its extremely liberal nature led to a civil war headed by Pedro Diez Canseco and José Balta, which ended Prado's presidency and re-established the 1860 constitution.

The new Balta government appointed a young Nicolás de Piérola as Minister of Economy, who signed a treaty with the Jewish–French businessman Auguste Dreyfus. For its part, the House of Dreyfus paid S/. two million in advance, and undertook to pay at a rate of S/. 700 thousand each month and to cover the interest on the Peruvian foreign debt.

As a result of the income from the Dreyfus contract, Peru embarked on a railroad-building program. The American entrepreneur Henry Meiggs built a standard gauge line from Callao across the Andes to the interior, Huancayo; he built the line and controlled its politics for a while; in the end, he bankrupted himself and the country. Financial problems forced the government to take over in 1874. The labor conditions were complex, with conflicts arising from different levels of skill and organization among the North Americans, Europeans, Blacks, and the Chinese. Conditions were very brutal for the Chinese, and led to strikes and violent suppression.

Elections were held in 1872, with Manuel Pardo of the Civilista Party being elected as the first civilian president of Peru. The ascension of a civil government disturbed many members of the military, who believed they would lose the privileges that they had enjoyed until then. Among the concerned were the Gutiérrez brothers, originally from Huancarqui. The brothers, headed by Colonel Tomás Gutiérrez, carried out a coup d'état against Balta on July 22, 1872. The new government lasted until the 26th, when the brothers were overthrown, with three of them being killed and only one surviving.

Pardo became president on August 2, ending the First Militarism that had existed since 1827. Under his government, the Treaty of Defensive Alliance was signed with Bolivia, which would lead Peru to fight against Chile 7 years later.

==== War of the Pacific ====
Territorial changes after the war

In 1879, Peru entered the War of the Pacific, after Bolivia invoked its alliance with Peru against Chile. The Peruvian Government tried to mediate the dispute by sending a diplomatic team to negotiate with the Chilean government, but the committee concluded that war was inevitable. On 14 March 1879, Bolivia declared war and Chile, in response, declared war on Bolivia and Peru on 5 April 1879 with Peru following with its own declaration of war the next day.

The Chilean land campaigns in Tarapacá, Tacna and Arica, Lima and Breña eventually led to the Chilean occupation of these territories, which were administered from occupied Lima. In parallel with the occupying administration, a collaborationist government was also established in Lima under the protection of Chile. The government was initially based in La Magdalena, and then in Cajamarca. This government's legitimacy was disputed by the Peruvian Resistance, which continued fighting in the sierra. The Chilean naval campaign also proved crucial, and allowed for attacks in the northern coast of the country. One notable figure of this campaign, who is held in high esteem by Peruvians and Chileans alike, was Miguel Grau, who was killed in action during the Battle of Angamos, and whose ship, the Huáscar, was captured by the Chilean Navy.

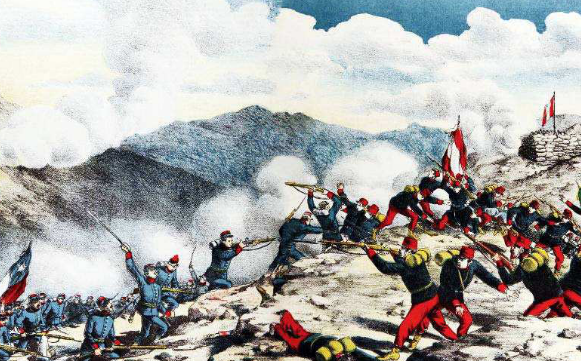
1882-83 Sierra Campaign

The war reached its peak after the Battle of Tacna, which effectively destroyed the Peruvian–Bolivian alliance, and ended with a Chilean victory over Peru and Bolivia, with the former's government in Lima signing the Treaty of Ancón in 1883, where the Department of Tarapacá was ceded to Chile and the fates of the provinces of Tacna and Arica were to be decided by a plebiscite that was meant to take place ten years after the treaty, but would eventually never take place.

The question over the Peruvian provinces of Tacna and Arica would manifest itself as the Chilean–Peruvian territorial dispute, while the Bolivian reaction to the loss of its Litoral Department, and thus, its access to the sea, would manifest itself as the Bolivian–Chilean territorial dispute, and commemorated annually with the Día del Mar.

=== National reconstruction (1884–1895) ===
After the War of the Pacific, an extraordinary effort of rebuilding began, and military figures once again assumed control of the government due to the perceived weakness of civilian heads of state in a period of constant war, beginning the Second Militarism (Spanish: Segundo Militarismo). In contrast to the First Militarism, the military leaders returned to the political arena, but no longer as triumphant heroes, but as the defeated. The government started to initiate a number of social and economic reforms in order to recover from the damage of the war.

During this period, the occupied provinces of Tacna and Arica were subject to a process known as Chilenization, where Chilean culture was promoted in order to replace Peruvian culture. Groups known as Patriotic Leagues were also established in order to encourage Peruvians to leave, while Chilean families soon began to emigrate to the region. Those who left established themselves mainly in Callao or participated in the colonization project carried out by the local government in Loreto to counter Colombian claims over the region, establishing the settlements of Puerto Arica and Tarapacá. After the signing of the Salomón–Lozano Treaty in 1922, these settlements would be ceded to Colombia, with some settlers moving to Peru and establishing the settlements of Nuevo Tarapacá and Puerto Arica.

Due to Iglesias' re-establishment of the indigenous tribute and abuses committed against Indians by landowners, on March 1, 1885, a rebellion in Huaraz headed by Pedro Pablo Atusparía began, with the conflict coming to an end only in 1887.

==== Conflict between Iglesias and Cáceres ====
Miguel Iglesias' Regenerator Government that had been established under Chilean occupation and signed the Treaty of Ancón continued to function as the constitutional government of Peru. During this period, Andrés Avelino Cáceres, who had fought the Breña campaign and was known as the Hero of Breña, opposed Iglesias and received more popular support than Iglesias' government.

Iglesias attempted to negotiate with Cáceres for his support. Eventually, negotiations failed and he demanded his unconditional submission. For his part, Cáceres proceeded to proclaim himself President on July 16, 1884, arguing the breakdown of the constitutional order. This disagreement led to the Peruvian Civil War of 1884–1885.

The forces of Iglesias and Cáceres initially clashed in Lima and later in Trujillo. Faced with his defeats on the north coast, Cáceres withdrew to the south center: Cuzco, Arequipa, Apurímac and Ayacucho, where he was able to reorganize his army to attack again. He ordered his troops to be defeated near Jauja while he moved his best troops to Huaripampa, who cut off bridges that would've allowed Iglesias' troops return and eventually moved to Lima where they carried out a successful offensive against Iglesias, ending the civil war. Iglesias would be exiled to Spain, only returning in 1895 after being elected as senator for Cajamarca, dying later in 1909.

==== Conflict between Cáceres and de Piérola ====
Cáceres assumed the presidency for the second time, on August 10, 1894. But he lacked legitimacy and popularity. The Anti-Cacerists formed the National Coalition, made up of democrats and civil supporters, who elected Nicolás de Piérola as leader, then exiled in Chile. Throughout Peru, groups of Montoneros arose that joined the cause of the Coalition. Piérola returned to Peru, disembarked in Puerto Caballas, in Ica, and went to Chincha, where he gave a Manifesto to the Nation, taking the title of National Delegate, and immediately campaigning on Lima, leading the Montoneros. They attacked the capital from March 17 to 19, 1895. Seeing himself deprived of the support of the people, turned massively towards the coalition partners, Cáceres resigned and went into exile.

A Government Board was installed after the victory in Lima of Piérola's montoneros and the departure of Cáceres into exile, and Manuel Candamo was elected president of a Government Board, to which he did not belong, taking charge of the Ministry of Foreign Affairs; He spent six months in that position, from March 20 to September 8, 1895, when he handed over the command to Piérola, winner of the elections. After a brief period in which the military once again controlled the country, civilian rule was permanently established with Pierola's election in 1895. His second term was successfully completed in 1899 and was marked by his reconstruction of a devastated Peru by initiating fiscal, military, religious, and civil reforms. With the county in a delicate state, political stability was achieved only in the early 1900s.

=== Aristocratic Republic (1895–1919) ===
With de Piérola elected president of Peru, the country began its period known as the Aristocratic Republic (Spanish: República Aristocrática), owing its name to the fact that most of the presidents that ruled the country during this period were from the country's social elite.

Economic dependence on English and American capitalism was accentuated and new economic activities were developed: agro-export (sugar and cotton), rubber extraction and oil extraction. However, the country did not industrialize due to the fact that a purely economistic development perspective was formed through a rentier and primary exporter state, which increased discrimination and exploitation of indigenous peoples through Correríos, Yanaconajes and Enganches. One such example was the Putumayo genocide, which took place during the Amazon rubber boom. The discomfort of the popular classes was manifested in the emergence of the anarcho-syndicalist labor movement and the outbreak of strikes.

This period of history soon saw its first conflicts, with its first one taking place in 1896. Separatists in Loreto revolted against the government, seceded from Peru, and established the short lived Federal State of Loreto. The government's response was to send troops to the area in order to suppress the insurrection, which was accomplished. A couple of years later, Colonel and Prefect of Loreto Emilio Vizcarra seceded from Peru and proclaimed the Jungle Republic, an unrecognized secessionist state whose declared borders coincided with those of the Loreto Department, at the time composed of the modern departments of Loreto, San Martín, and Ucayali. President Eduardo López de Romaña immediately sent troops to deal with the situation and the state ceased to exist in 1900.

Another conflict took place in Huanta, as a result of reforms, that included the establishment of a salt tax and the ban on circulation of Bolivian currency in the region. Among the participants of this conflict were veterans of previous conflicts, such as the Breña campaign and of the civil war of 1884–85.

==== The twenty-four friends ====
One group prevalent in the country's aristocracy was known as the twenty-four friends (Spanish: Los veinticuatro amigos), whose members were affiliated with the Civilista Party. Traditionally it is said that it was founded in a meeting on July 28, 1892. Most of the families that belonged to this group were rentiers, landowners, bankers, businessmen who produced sugar and cotton, newspaper owners, and renowned intellectuals and professionals who belonged to the National Club, where they met weekly on Fridays. The members of the club were:

- Francisco Rosas Balcázar, diplomat and politician, minister during the government of Manuel Pardo y Lavalle
- Luis Carranza: co-director of El Comercio.
- Pedro Correa y Santiago, businessman and politician.
- José Antonio Miró Quesada: director and owner of El Comercio.
- Louis Dubois.
- Narciso de Aramburú.
- Ernest Malinowski, Polish engineer.
- Armando Velez.
- Domingo Olavegoya Yriarte, businessman and landowner.
- Isaac Alzamora, renowned lawyer.
- Luis Felipe Villarán: lawyer and minister during the government of Manuel Candamo.
- Domingo M. Almenara Butler.
- Estanislao Pardo de Figueroa y de Águila: lawyer and politician.
- Pedro D. Gallagher Robertson-Gibbs: mining businessman, banker, president of the Chamber of Commerce.
- Ezequiel Álvarez-Calderón
- Manuel Álvarez-Calderón, businessman.
- Calixto Pfeiffer
- Carlos Ferreyros, politician.
- Enrique Barreda y Osma, businessman and politician.
- Ántero Aspíllaga Barrera, businessman and politician.
- Luis N. Bryce y de Vivero, businessman and politician.
- Alejandro Garland, businessman.
- Leonidas Cárdenas

Other characters that also would make up the select group were:

- Felipe de Osma y Pardo
- Augusto B. Leguía
- Felipe Pardo y Barreda
- Francisco Tudela y Varela
- Antonio Miró Quesada de la Guerra
- José Pardo y Aliaga
- Víctor Manuel Maúrtua

==== Territorial disputes ====
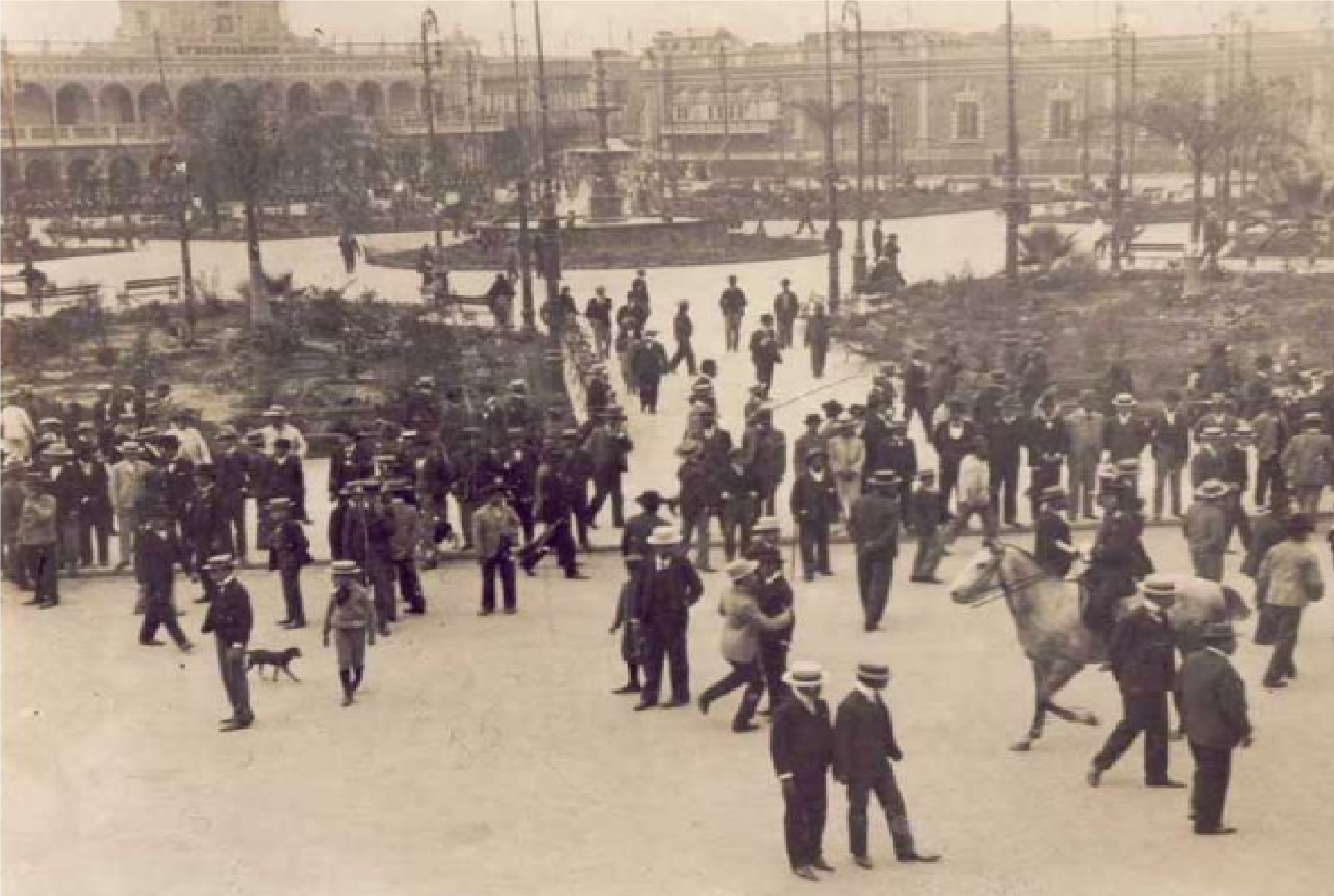
The Main Square of Lima during the attempted coup of 1909.

Augusto B. Leguía's first presidency took place during this period, during which he was faced with territorial disputes between all neighboring countries of Peru, of which only the Brazilian and Bolivian territorial disputes were solved on September 8 and 17 September, 1909, respectively. Skirmishes took place in 1910 with Ecuador and in 1911 with Colombia, the latter of which became known as the La Pedrera conflict. Due to Chile's continuing Chilenization policies in Tacna and Arica, relations between both states were severed.

Leguía also had to face internal conflict, including an attempted coup d'état in 1909, carried out by Nicolás de Piérola's brother Carlos with his children. Leguía separated from the Civilista Party, which split into two factions: those loyal to Pardo and those loyal to Leguía. In the last two years of his government, an acute economic crisis manifested itself, motivated by accelerated internal indebtedness, national defense expenses and the budget deficit.

Guillermo Billinghurst wanted to favor the working class, which earned him opposition from conservative elements. He had a tenacious struggle with Congress, dominated by civilistas and leguiistas, his political enemies. It was then proposed to dissolve parliament and summon the people to carry out fundamental constitutional reforms, which provoked the military uprising of Colonel Óscar R. Benavides, known as the hero of La Pedrera, who overthrew Billinghurst on February 4, 1914.

After assuming control of the government, Benavides faced the monetary problem and promised to restore the legal order. In 1915 he convened a Convention of the civilist, liberal and constitutional parties, so that they could launch a unified candidacy. The chosen one was former president José Pardo y Barreda, of the Civilista Party, who overwhelmingly won the elections that year, defeating the symbolic candidacy of Carlos de Piérola, of the Democratic Party.

The second government of José Pardo was characterized by political and social violence, a symptom of the exhaustion of civil society and the world crisis. As a result of the First World War, the economic condition of the working class worsened and the field was prepared for the development of trade union action. There were successive strikes that demanded the reduction of subsistence prices and the implementation of the "8-hour work" day; the latter was finally granted, by decree of January 15, 1919. In the southern Andes, the abuses of landowners and gamonales on the native and peasant population motivated many indigenous uprisings, such as the one led in 1915 by Teodomiro Gutiérrez Cuevas, also known by his pseudonym Rumi Maqui.

Pardo called for elections in 1919, in which former president Augusto B. Leguía ran, who faced the official candidacy represented by Ántero Aspíllaga. The elections, which were not deemed very fair, declared Leguía the winner, but numerous votes were annulled in the official recount. Faced with the danger that the elections would be annulled and that they would be transferred to Congress, where the civilistas had a majority, Leguía and his supporters staged a coup, with the support of the gendarmerie, on July 4, 1919. Thus ended the "Aristocratic Republic" and began what would become Leguía's Oncenio.

=== The Oncenio (1919–1930) ===
As had happened with his previous government, the entrance of American capital became general and the bourgeoisie was favored. This policy, along with increased dependence on foreign investment, focused opposition from the most progressive sectors of Peruvian society against the landowner oligarchy.

The presidency of Leguía coincided with the centennial celebrations of Peru's independence on July 28, 1921, and in 1924, commemorating the Battle of Ayacucho. Leguía referred to his government as the New Motherland (Spanish: La Nueva Patria), which became known for its urban transformation of Lima to coincide with the aforementioned centennial.

==== Territorial disputes ====
Map showing the Tacna-Arica dispute and its solution

A final peace treaty was signed between Peru and Chile in 1929, known as the Treaty of Lima. As per the treaty, Tacna returned to Peru and Peru yielded permanently the formerly rich provinces of Arica and Tarapacá, but kept certain rights to the port activities in Arica and restrictions on what Chile can do on those territories. The treaty was controversial in Peru, but nevertheless put a major end to the Chilean–Peruvian territorial dispute.

In 1921, Peruvian captain Guillermo Cervantes declared the Federal State of Loreto, which existed as a de facto autonomous region of the country. The rebel authorities authorized the distribution of provisional banknotes made out of cardboard used by locals as currency, and local ports were ordered shut, with local trade and navigation being tightly controlled. The revolution was quickly accepted by the local population, but was met negatively by Peru's president Augusto Leguía, who sent a few troops to the area, and shut down trade to the region. The local guerrillas' military inferiority soon became apparent, and by early 1922, a famished Iquitos had been occupied by Peruvian troops headed by Peruvian Captain Genaro Matos, while Cervantes had escaped on January 9 and sought refuge in the Ecuadorian jungle and his army soon became little more than an insurgency.

In 1922, another treaty, the Salomón–Lozano Treaty, was signed between Peru and Colombia with the United States acting as a mediator, where a large amount of territory was ceded to Colombia allowing them access to the Amazon River, further reducing Peru's territory with the exception of a de jure exclave in Sucumbíos. This treaty also proved controversial, most notably in Loreto, as protests took place and local dissatisfaction would eventually lead to the Leticia Incident in 1932. Nevertheless, the treaty also ended the Colombian–Peruvian territorial dispute, although it was also disputed by Ecuador.

In 1924, from Mexico, university reform leaders in Peru who had been forced into exile by the government founded the American People's Revolutionary Alliance (APRA), which had a major influence on the country's political life. APRA is largely a political expression of the university reform and workers' struggles of the years 1918–1920. The movement draws its influences from the Mexican Revolution and its 1917 Constitution, particularly on issues of agrarianism and indigenism, and to a lesser extent from the Russian Revolution. Close to Marxism (its leader, Haya de la Torre, declares that "APRA is the Marxist interpretation of the American reality"), it nevertheless moves away from it on the question of class struggle and on the importance given to the struggle for the political unity of Latin America.

In 1928, the Peruvian Socialist Party was founded, notably under the leadership of José Carlos Mariátegui, himself a former member of APRA. Shortly afterwards, in 1929, the party created the General Confederation of Workers.

After the worldwide crisis of 1929, numerous brief governments followed one another. The APRA party had the opportunity to cause system reforms by means of political actions, but it was not successful. This was a nationalistic movement, populist and anti-imperialist, headed by Víctor Raúl Haya de la Torre in 1924. The Socialist Party of Peru, later the Peruvian Communist Party, was created four years later and it was led by José Carlos Mariátegui.

This period would come to an end after a coup d'état carried out by Lieutenant colonel Luis Miguel Sánchez Cerro and his sympathizers, with General Manuel María Ponce Brousset assuming the interim Presidency for two days until Sánchez Cerro's return to Lima from Arequipa.

=== Third Militarism (1930–1939) ===
With Leguía overthrown, the country entered its Third Militarism (Spanish: Tercer militarismo), as military figures once again took control of the government. A military junta was established, and Manuel María Ponce Brousset was the first to assume the presidency, being succeeded by the more popular Luis Miguel Sánchez Cerro, who was the first Peruvian President to have Indigenous Peruvian ancestry as well as allegedly also being of Afro-Peruvian Malagasy descent based on a rumour he was from a part of Piura populated by descendants of Malagasy slaves. Other major events of this period were the beginning of the irruption of the organized masses in politics and the growth of the middle classes.

Sánchez Cerro called for elections while in power, intending to run as a candidate. Due to this, a revolt took place in Arequipa, where Sánchez Cerro was forced to resign. As a result, then Archbishop of Lima, Monsignor Mariano Holguín took over the junta on April 1, 1931. After a few hours, Holguín transferred his power to Leoncio Elías. Elías had called a meeting where it was agreed that David Samanez Ocampo would become the new head of state, but arrangements for this never took place, as he was overthrown by Gustavo Jiménez, who had returned from Arequipa, where he had travelled to stop the revolt. Nevertheless, Samanez Ocampo, who was chosen due to his popularity, assumed the presidency on March 11, 1931, and called for elections on October 11 of the same year. As a result, Sánchez Cerro was elected president of Peru.

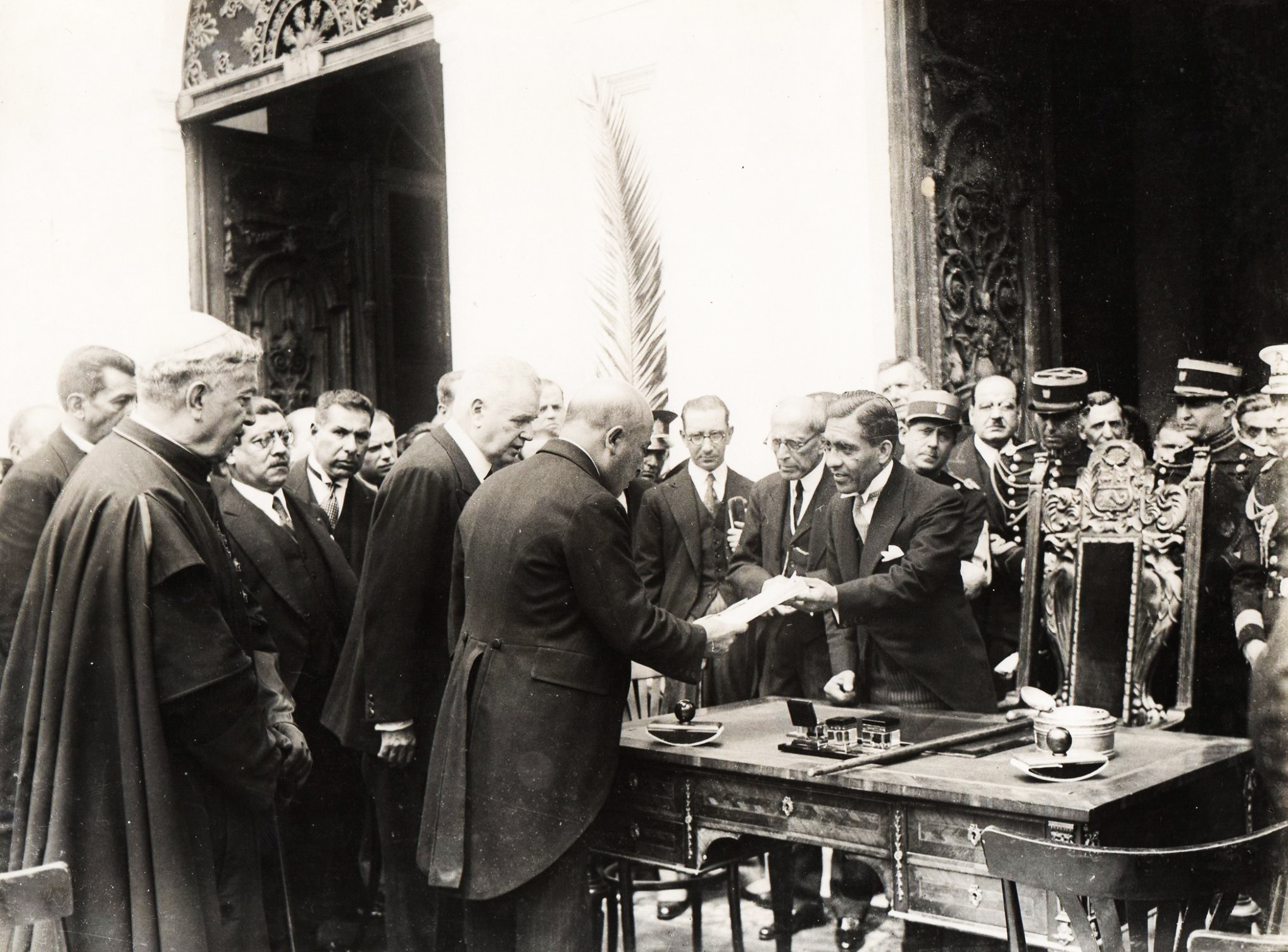
Sánchez Cerro during the signing ceremony of the new constitution on April 9, 1933.

Sánchez Cerro's government was opposed by the left-wing American Popular Revolutionary Alliance, and, as a result, political repression was brutal in the early 1930s, with tens of thousands of Apristas were executed or imprisoned. A revolt that took place in Trujillo and was brutally repressed was one such example.

This period was also characterized by a sudden population growth and an increase in urbanization. According to Alberto Flores Galindo, "By the 1940 census, the last that utilized racial categories, mestizos were grouped with whites, and the two constituted more than 53 percent of the population. Mestizos likely outnumbered the indigenous peoples and were the largest population group."

Under Sánchez Cerro's constitutional government, a new constitution would be adopted, and works such as the construction of the Carretera Central, which connected Lima with La Oroya, Tarma and La Merced and the investment in the Peruvian Armed Forces took place. The latter proved to be an important part of the government, as all three branches of the Armed Forces would soon become involved in the conflict with Colombia, that would erupt into armed conflict in September 1932.

==== Conflict with Colombia ====
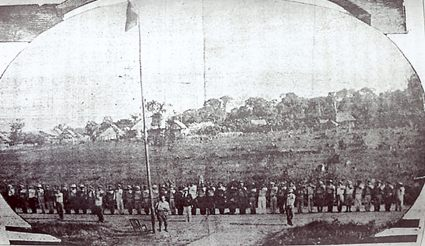
The flag of Peru flies over the port of Leticia after the takeover

The foreign policy of Sánchez Cerro's government was initially intended to respect the border treaties signed up to that point, but public opposition to the Salomón–Lozano Treaty eventually led to a civilian takeover of the port town of Leticia, which ended up being supported by the government. The event led to protests in Colombia, and the beginning of the Colombia–Peru War on September 1, 1932.

On April 30, 1933, while reviewing troops in the Santa Beatriz Hipodrome, Sánchez Cerro was assassinated by Abelardo González Leiva, who shot him three times. It was later publicized that González was a member of the APRA Party, leading to speculation on whether he had been ordered to carry out the attack or had acted alone. Sánchez Cerro's was succeeded as Supreme Chief of his political party, Revolutionary Union, by Luis A. Flores, who reconstructed the party into a more fascist direction, modelling it after the National Fascist Party of Italy.

==== Final years ====
Óscar R. Benavides assumed the presidency as a result of Sánchez Cerro's assassination and upheld the Salomón–Lozano Treaty with Colombia, leading to the end of the war. He also signed the General Amnesty Law on August 9, 1933, which favored the Apristas. But after a revolutionary attempt in El Agustino, the anti-Aprista persecution resumed. The Apristas responded with terrorist acts throughout the country, including the assassination of Antonio Miró Quesada, owner of El Comercio, and his wife on May 15, 1935.

In 1936, presidential elections were held. The Mayor of Lima, Luis Antonio Eguiguren won, however the election was annulled by Benavides, citing that Eguiguren had won with the votes of the banned APRA. Benavides dissolved Congress and ruled as dictator until 1939.

Under Benavides' government, new ministries were created and tourism was promoted. The Government Palace was renovated in 1937, the Legislative Palace and Palace of Justice were finished, and social works were put into place, including the construction of dining rooms and sewers.

During this period, the Spanish Civil War began in 1936. As a result, pro-Republican and pro-Nationalist factions were established by the Spanish residents in Peru, as well as their Peruvian sympathizers. The former was more popular among left-leaning groups, including the Apristas, while the latter was more popular among the aristocracy and the Spanish expatriates living in Peru, evoking the feeling of the Hispanidad. A Spanish–Peruvian Clothing Fund (Spanish: Ropero Peruano Español) was established in Lima, which was nominally in charge of delivering clothing to the children of both factions, but ended up assisting the Nationalist faction almost exclusively. As a result of its support of the Francoist side, Peru did not receive Republican exiles after the war, instead continuing its relations with the new government in Spain. The conflict increased the divide between the right and left-leaning sectors of society, most notably in cities such as Arequipa.

During the last years of the Benavides government, the weariness of the population became noticeable. On February 19, 1939, General Antonio Rodríguez Ramírez attempted a coup, apparently with great support from various sectors. Although said caudillo was killed in the Government Palace after being machine-gunned by a police officer, Benavides understood the message and called for general elections, that took place on October 22 of the same year. The government's candidate and the son of former President Mariano Ignacio Prado, banker Manuel Prado Ugarteche, easily beat his opponent, lawyer José Quesada Larrea. As a result, there was talk of electoral fraud.

=== Democratic Spring (1939–1948) ===
With Prado as president, the Democratic Spring (Spanish: Primavera Democrática) began. Despite the new civilian government, this era would be characterized by two major military conflicts: the Ecuadorian–Peruvian War and World War II.

Manuel Prado assumed the presidency on December 8, 1939, beginning what would be his first government. A previously largely unknown politician, he was predicted to not last long in office, but he displayed a strategic flexibility that eventually earned him support. His government largely continued the work started by General Benavides, maintaining strong links with the oligarchy. It was a relative democracy. He kept the Aprista Party outlawed and received the support of the Communist Party.

During his tenure as president, skirmishes took place with Ecuador starting on July 5, 1941, beginning the Ecuadorian–Peruvian War. With the events escalating to a point where the Peruvian Air Corps was bombarding Ecuadorian outposts along the border, an offensive by Peru began on July 23, with Peruvian troops marching into the Ecuadorian provinces of El Oro, as well as Loja, Santiago Zamora and Napo Pastaza. A ceasefire was declared effective on the afternoon of July 31, which was preceded by an aerial assault carried out by Peruvian paratroopers on the port of Puerto Bolívar, near Machala, which was also occupied.

An agreement known as the Talara Accord (Spanish: Acuerdo de Talara) was signed on October 2, under which a demilitarized zone was established in Ecuador under Ecuadorian administration, and the province of El Oro was occupied by Peru until the signing of the Rio Protocol in January 1942, with Peruvian troops withdrawing the following month. The treaty signed in Rio established a border commission in charge of delimiting the border between Ecuador and Peru, which was accomplished with the exception of a small part of the border that eventually continued the dispute. As a result of the delimitation of the border in the coast, integration between both countries continued to grow during the following years.

Peru remained neutral during World War II, continuing its relations with countries in both factions, but nevertheless favoring the Allied faction. On 12 February 1945, Peru was the fourth South American nation to join the Allied forces against the Axis – following Brazil on 22 August 1942, Bolivia on 7 April 1943 and Colombia on 26 November 1943. As part of the Japanese-American internment program, the country rounded up around 2,000 of its Japanese immigrant population and shipped them to the United States, where they were placed in concentration camps. Despite the late entry of the country into the conflict, some volunteers had already left for Europe beforehand. One example was Jorge Sanjinez Lenz, who enlisted in the Belgian Piron Brigade, and fought in the Battle of Normandy.

==== Bustamante administration ====
Following the Allied victory in World War II by 2 September 1945, Víctor Raúl Haya de la Torre (founder of the APRA), together with José Carlos Mariátegui (leader of the Peruvian Communist Party), were two major forces in Peruvian politics. Ideologically opposed, they both managed to create the first political parties that tackled the social and economic problems of the country. Although Mariátegui died at a young age, President Bustamante y Rivero hoped to create a more democratic government by limiting the power of the military and the oligarchy. Elected with the cooperation of the APRA, conflict soon arose between the President and Haya de la Torre. Without the support of the APRA party, Bustamante y Rivero found his presidency severely limited. The President disbanded his Aprista cabinet and replaced it with a mostly military one. In 1948, Minister Manuel A. Odría and other right-wing elements of the Cabinet urged Bustamante y Rivero to ban the APRA, but when the President refused, Odría resigned his post.

=== The Ochenio (1948–1956) ===
In a military coup on 27 October 1948, general Manuel A. Odría became the new president. Odría's presidency was known as the Ochenio. He cracked down on APRA members and sympathizers, momentarily pleasing the oligarchy and all others on the right, but followed a populist course that won him great favor with the poor and lower classes. A thriving economy allowed him to indulge in expensive but crowd-pleasing social policies. At the same time, however, civil rights were severely restricted and corruption was rampant throughout his régime.

It was feared that his dictatorship would run indefinitely, so it came as a surprise when Odría allowed new elections. During this time, Fernando Belaúnde Terry started his political career, and led the slate submitted by the National Front of Democratic Youth. After the National Election Board refused to accept his candidacy, he led a massive protest, and the striking image of Belaúnde walking with the flag was featured by news magazine Caretas the following day, in an article entitled "Así Nacen Los Lideres" ("Thus Are Leaders Born"). Belaúnde's 1956 candidacy was ultimately unsuccessful, as the dictatorship-favored right-wing candidacy of Manuel Prado Ugarteche took first place.

=== Moderate civil reform (1956–1968) ===
Belaúnde ran for president once again in the national elections of 1962; this time with his own party, Acción Popular (Popular Action). The results were very tight; he ended in second place, following Víctor Raúl Haya de la Torre (APRA), by less than 14,000 votes. Since none of the candidates managed to get the constitutionally established minimum of one third of the vote required to win outright, selection of the President should have fallen to Congress; the long-held antagonistic relationship between the military and APRA prompted Haya de la Torre to make a deal with former dictator Odría, who had come in third, which would have resulted in Odría taking the Presidency in a coalition government.

However, widespread allegations of fraud prompted the Peruvian military to depose Prado and install a military junta, led by Ricardo Perez Godoy. Godoy ran a short transitional government and held new elections in 1963, which were won by Belaúnde by a more comfortable but still narrow five percent margin. Belaúnde took office on July 28 of the same year. His presidency would continue until its interruption in 1968.

Throughout Latin America in the 1960s, communist movements inspired by the Cuban Revolution sought to win power through guerrilla warfare. The Revolutionary Left Movement, or MIR, launched an insurrection that had been crushed by 1965, but Peru's internal strife would only accelerate until its climax in the 1990s.

=== Radical military reform (1968–1980) ===
After a crisis involving the missing last page of a document signed between the Peruvian government and the International Petroleum Company, General Juan Velasco Alvarado overthrew elected President Fernando Belaúnde Terry in a successful coup d'état in 1968. As part of what has been called the "first phase" of the military government's nationalist program, Velasco undertook an extensive agrarian reform program and nationalized the fish meal industry, some petroleum companies, and several banks and mining firms. The Velasco administration saw its worst moment during the Limazo, a period of civil unrest and rioting in Lima after a strike carried out by members of the Civil Guard and the Republican Guard.

In 1971, the country celebrated its 150th anniversary since its independence. As a result, the Revolutionary Government established the National Commission for the Sesquicentennial of the Independence of Peru (Spanish: Comisión Nacional del Sesquicentenario de la Independencia del Perú (CNSIP)) to manage the celebrations.

General Francisco Morales Bermúdez overthrew Velasco in 1975, citing Velasco's economic mismanagement and deteriorating health. Morales Bermúdez moved the revolution into a more conservative "second phase", tempering the radical measures of the first phase and beginning the task of restoring the country's economy. A constitutional assembly was created in 1979, which was led by Víctor Raúl Haya de la Torre. Morales Bermúdez presided over the return to civilian government in accordance with a new constitution drawn up in 1979, calling a general election in 1980.

=== Terrorism and the Fujimorato (1980–2000) ===
During the 1980s, cultivation of illicit coca was established in large areas on the eastern Andean slope. Rural insurgent movements, like the Shining Path (Sendero Luminoso, SL) and the Túpac Amaru Revolutionary Movement (MRTA) increased and derived significant financial support from alliances with the narcotics traffickers, leading to the Internal conflict in Peru.

In the May 1980 elections, President Fernando Belaúnde Terry was returned to office by a strong plurality. One of his first actions as president was the return of several newspapers to their respective owners. In this way, freedom of speech once again played an important part in Peruvian politics. Gradually, he also attempted to undo some of the most radical effects of the Agrarian Reform initiated by Velasco and reversed the independent stance that the military government of Velasco had with the United States.

Belaúnde's second term was also marked by the unconditional support for Argentine forces during the Falklands War with the United Kingdom in 1982. Belaúnde declared that "Peru was ready to support Argentina with all the resources it needed". This included a number of fighter planes and possibly personnel from the Peruvian Air Force, as well as ships, and medical teams. Belaunde's government proposed a peace settlement between the two countries, but it was rejected by both sides, as both claimed undiluted sovereignty of the territory. In response to Chile's support of the UK, Belaúnde called for Latin American unity.

The nagging economic problems left over from the previous military government persisted, worsened by an occurrence of the "El Niño" weather phenomenon in 1982–83, which caused widespread flooding in some parts of the country, severe droughts in others, and decimated the schools of ocean fish that are one of the country's major resources. After a promising beginning, Belaúnde's popularity eroded under the stress of inflation, economic hardship, and terrorism.

In 1985, the American Popular Revolutionary Alliance (APRA) won the presidential election, bringing Alan García to office. The transfer of the presidency from Belaúnde to García on 28 July 1985 was Peru's first exchange of power from one democratically elected leader to another in 40 years.

With a parliamentary majority for the first time in APRA's history, Alan García started his administration with hopes for a better future. However, economic mismanagement led to hyperinflation from 1988 to 1990. García's term in office was marked by bouts of hyperinflation, which reached 7,649% in 1990 and had a cumulative total of 2,200,200% between July 1985 and July 1990, thereby profoundly destabilizing the Peruvian economy.

Owing to such chronic inflation, the Peruvian currency, the sol, was replaced by the Inti in mid-1985, which itself was replaced by the nuevo sol ("new sun") in July 1991, at which time the new sol had a cumulative value of one billion old soles. During his administration, the per capita annual income of Peruvians fell to $720 (below the level of 1960) and Peru's GDP dropped 20%. By the end of his term, national reserves were a negative $900 million.

The economic turbulence of the time exacerbated social tensions in Peru and partly contributed to the rise of the violent rebel movement Shining Path. The García administration unsuccessfully sought a military solution to the growing terrorism, committing human rights violations which are still under investigation.

In June 1989, demonstrations for free education were severely repressed by the army: 18 people were killed according to official figures, but non-governmental estimates suggest several dozen deaths. This event led to a radicalization of political protests in the countryside and ultimately led to the outbreak of the Shining Path's armed and terrorist actions.

==== Fujimori's presidency and the Fujishock (1990–2000) ====
Concerned about the economy, the increasing terrorist threat from Sendero Luminoso and MRTA, and allegations of official corruption, voters chose a relatively unknown mathematician-turned-politician, Alberto Fujimori, as president in 1990. The first round of the election was won by well-known writer Mario Vargas Llosa, a conservative candidate who went on to receive the Nobel Prize in Literature in 2010, but Fujimori defeated him in the second round. Fujimori implemented drastic measures that caused inflation to drop from 7,650% in 1990 to 139% in 1991. The currency was devalued by 200%, prices were rising sharply (especially gasoline, whose price is multiplied by 30), hundreds of public companies were privatized and 300,000 jobs were being lost. The majority of the population had not benefited from the years of strong growth, which ultimately only widened the gap between rich and poor. The poverty rate remained at around 50%. (Note: The currency devalued by 200%, prices rose sharply (especially gasoline, whose price was multiplied by 30), hundreds of public companies were privatized and 300,000 jobs were lost. However, the social balance sheet remains much less positive. The majority of the population has not benefited from the years of strong growth, which will ultimately only widen the gap between rich and poor. The poverty rate remained at around 50%, a level comparable to Alan Garcia's completion rates.)

Fujimori dissolved Congress in the self-coup of 5 April 1992, in order to have total control of the government of Peru. He then eliminated the constitution; called new congressional elections; and implemented substantial economic reform, including privatization of numerous state-owned companies, creation of an investment-friendly climate, and sound management of the economy.

Fujimori's administration was dogged by several insurgent groups, most notably Sendero Luminoso (Shining Path), which carried on a terrorist campaign in the countryside throughout the 1980s and 1990s. He cracked down on the insurgents and was successful in largely quelling them by the late 1990s, but the fight was marred by atrocities committed by both the Peruvian security forces and the insurgents: the Barrios Altos massacre and La Cantuta massacre by government paramilitary groups, and the bombings of Tarata and Frecuencia Latina by Shining Path. Those examples subsequently came to be seen as symbols of the human rights violations committed during the last years of violence. With the capture of Abimael Guzmán (known as President Gonzalo to the Shining Path) in September 1992, the Shining Path received a severe blow which practically destroyed the organization.

In December 1996, a group of insurgents belonging to the MRTA took over the Japanese embassy in Lima, taking 72 people hostage. Military commandos stormed the embassy compound in April 1997, which resulted in the death of all 15 hostage takers, one hostage, and 2 commandos. It later emerged, however, that Fujimori's security chief Vladimiro Montesinos may have ordered the killing of at least eight of the rebels after they surrendered.

Fujimori's constitutionally questionable decision to seek a third term and subsequent tainted victory in June 2000 brought political and economic turmoil, including the Four Quarters March of July 26–28, which left several dead and injured, and destroyed the building of the Banco de la Nación (Bank of the Nation). A bribery scandal that broke just weeks after he took office in July forced Fujimori to call new elections in which he would not run. The scandal involved Vladimiro Montesinos, who was shown in a video broadcast on TV bribing a politician to change sides. Montesinos subsequently emerged as the center of a vast web of illegal activities, including embezzlement, graft, drug trafficking, as well as human rights violations committed during the war against Sendero Luminoso.

=== Business republic (2000–2016) ===
In November 2000, Fujimori resigned from office and went to Japan in self-imposed exile, avoiding prosecution for human rights violations and corruption charges by the new Peruvian authorities. His main intelligence chief, Vladimiro Montesinos, fled Peru shortly afterwards. Authorities in Venezuela arrested him in Caracas in June 2001 and turned him over to Peruvian authorities; he is now imprisoned and charged with acts of corruption and human rights violations committed during Fujimori's administration.

A caretaker government presided over by Valentín Paniagua took on the responsibility of conducting new presidential and congressional elections. The elections were held in April 2001; observers considered them to be free and fair. Alejandro Toledo (who led the opposition against Fujimori) defeated former President Alan García.

The newly elected government took office on 28 July 2001. The Toledo Administration managed to restore some degree of democracy to Peru following the authoritarianism and corruption that plagued both the Fujimori and García governments. Innocents wrongfully tried by military courts during the war against terrorism (1980–2000) were allowed to receive new trials in civilian courts.

On 28 August 2003, the Truth and Reconciliation Commission (CVR), which had been charged with studying the roots of the violence of the 1980–2000 period, presented its formal report to the President.

President Toledo was forced to make a number of cabinet changes, mostly in response to personal scandals. Toledo's governing coalition had a minority of seats in Congress and had to negotiate on an ad hoc basis with other parties to form majorities on legislative proposals. Toledo's popularity in the polls suffered throughout the last years of his regime, due in part to family scandals and in part to dissatisfaction among workers with their share of benefits from Peru's macroeconomic success. After strikes by teachers and agricultural producers led to nationwide road blockages in May 2003, Toledo declared a state of emergency that suspended some civil liberties and gave the military power to enforce order in 12 regions. The state of emergency was later reduced to only the few areas where the Shining Path was operating.

On 28 July 2006, former president Alan García was reelected as the President of Peru. He won the 2006 elections after winning in a runoff against Ollanta Humala. In May 2008, President García was a signatory to the UNASUR Constitutive Treaty of the Union of South American Nations (USAN). Peru has ratified the treaty.

On 5 June 2011, Ollanta Humala was elected president in a run-off against Keiko Fujimori, the daughter of Alberto Fujimori and former First Lady of Peru, in the 2011 elections, making him the first leftist president of Peru since Juan Velasco Alvarado. In December 2011, a state of emergency was declared following popular opposition to some major mining project and environmental concerns.

=== Political crisis (2016–present) ===
Pedro Pablo Kuczynski was elected president in the general election in July 2016. His parents were Polish Jews fleeing from Nazism. Kuczynski was committed to integrating and acknowledging Peru's indigenous populations, with state-run TV beginning daily news broadcasts in Quechua and Aymara. Kuczynski was widely criticized on pardoning former President Alberto Fujimori, going against his campaign promises against his rival, Keiko Fujimori.

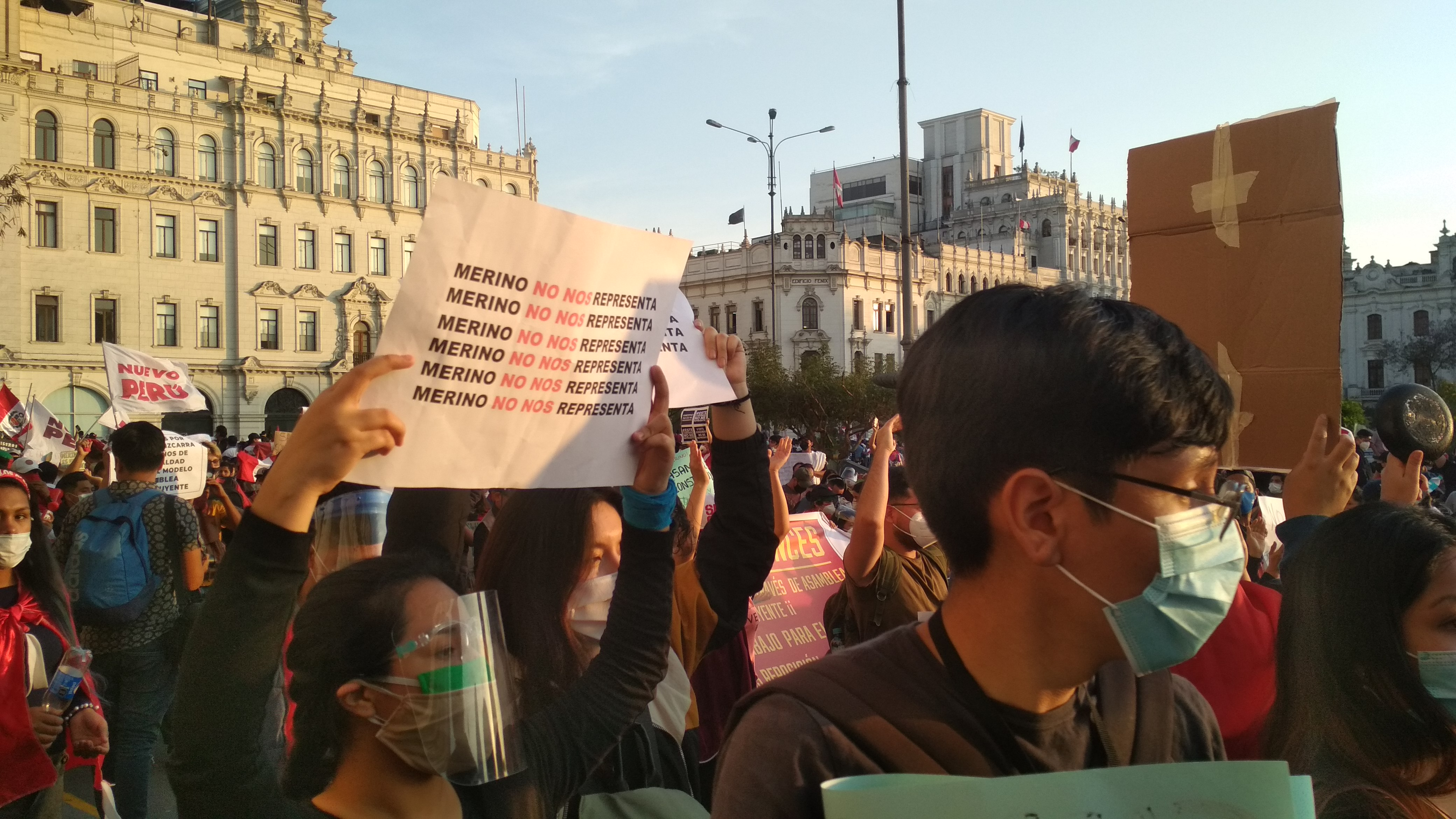
Demonstration in Lima against Manuel Merino, 12 November 2020

In March 2018, after a failure to impeach the president, Kuczynski faced yet again the threat of impeachment on the basis of corruption in vote buying and bribery with the Odebrecht corporation. On 23 March 2018, Kucyznski was forced to resign from the presidency, and has not been heard from since. His successor was his first vice president, engineer Martín Vizcarra. Vizcarra has announced publicly that he has no plans in seeking for re-election amidst the political crisis and instability. However, the Congress impeached President Martin Vizcarra in November 2020. His successor, interim president Manuel Merino, resigned after being in office for only five days. Merino was succeeded by interim president Francisco Sagasti, the third head of state in under a week.

On 28 July 2021, coinciding with the Bicentennial of the Independence of Peru, left-wing Pedro Castillo was sworn in as the new President of Peru after a narrow win against Keiko Fujimori in the 2022 election.

As a result of economic stagnation during the COVID-19 pandemic in Peru, between ten and twenty percent of Peruvians fell below the poverty line in 2020, reversing a decade of poverty reduction in the country and resulting in a poverty rate of 30.1% that year. Following the global economic reverberations resulting from Western-led sanctions against Russia due to the Russian invasion of Ukraine beginning in February 2022, inflation in Peru rose sharply. As a result, on 28 March 2022 mass protests began. The government responded to the rioting by deploying the Armed Forces. President Castillo declared a state of emergency and enforced a total curfew in Lima for the entire day of 5 April. In November 2022, thousands of opponents of the government marched through the capital's center to call for the removal of President Pedro Castillo.

After multiple attempts to remove Castillo were unsuccessful, Castillo attempted a self-coup on 7 December 2022 and was subsequently impeached and removed from office. Castillo's vice president Dina Boluarte was sworn in as the new president later that day, becoming the country's first female president. Following Castillo's removal, his supporters started nationwide protests demanding his release and Boluarte's resignation. On 14 December 2022, Peru's new government declared a 30-day national state of emergency to stop violent demonstrations.

On 10 October 2025, Peru's congress removed President Dina Boluarte from office and Jose Jeri was sworn in as Peru's interim president. On 17 February 2026, Peru's Congress ousted interim President José Jerí after four months in office, making him the third consecutive president to be ousted. On 18 February 2026, Peru's Congress elected José María Balcázar as interim President, making him the eighth president to lead Peru since 2016. In 2026, Congress returned to a bicameral legislature, replacing the previous unicameral body.

The 2026 general election was marred by a post-electoral crisis. In the first round, Keiko Fujimori and Roberto Sánchez advanced to the second round after ballot counting delays. In Peru's Congress, Fujimori's Popular Force emerged as the single-largest party in both chambers. The second round, held on 7 June, saw another tight contest, with Fujimori emerging as the victor after weeks of counting. On 28 July 2026, Keiko Fujimori was sworn in as Peru's president. In September 2026, Peru joined the “Shield of the Americas”, a regional security alliance led by the United States.

== See also ==
- Timeline of Peruvian history
- Viceroyalty of Peru
- Politics of Peru
- President of Peru
