= Guillermo Cervantes =

Peruvian captain and insurrectionist

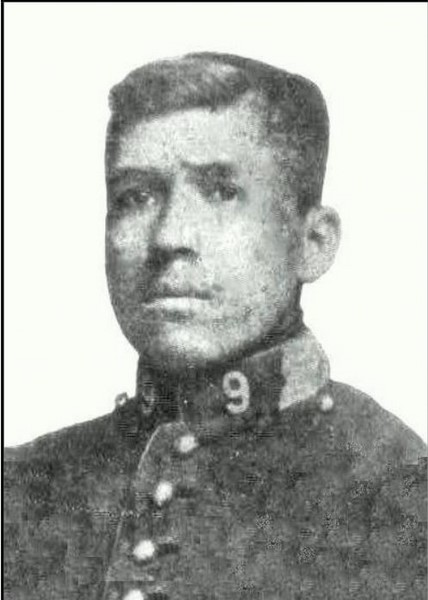

Leader of the Federal State of Loreto
- In office August 5, 1921 – 9 January 1922

Personal details
- Born: 19th century Peru
- Died: after January 1922 Amazon rainforest
- Party: Military

Military service
- Allegiance: Peru (until 1921); Loreto (1921–1922)
- Branch/service: Peruvian Army
- Years of service: Before 1911–1922
- Rank: Colonel
- Battles/wars: Colombian–Peruvian territorial dispute: Battle of La Pedrera; 1915 Puno Rebellion; 1921 Loretan Insurrection

Guillermo Cervantes Vásquez (died after 1922) was a Peruvian captain and leader of the Peruvian army. He formed the group of Veterans of Caquetá that fought in the 1911 Battle of La Pedrera against Colombia, but is better remembered for his insurrection in 1921 where he proclaimed the Third Federal State of Loreto, one of many attempts to transform Peru into a federal state.

== Biography ==
Born in Peru, he entered the Peruvian Army, where he met future president Luis Miguel Sánchez Cerro, with whom he participated against an insurrection in Puno in 1915. As the handing of the Amazon Trapeze to Colombia became apparent, he became frustrated and adamantly opposed it.

=== Insurrection ===
The Leguía administration was unaware of the discontent of the people in Loreto, who were dissatisfied with the treaty to be signed with Colombia, and was thus beginning to have small conflicts both with the Colombian authorities and with the authorities of the Regional Government of Loreto. This time, as an infantry captain, Cervantes took command of the "Cazadores del Oriente" regiment stationed in Iquitos, declaring himself in absentia on August 5, 1921, and issuing a Manifesto signed by 19 junior officers and 7 Loretan citizens:

Comrades, the military must stop serving the government's unscrupulous ends. We denounce the enrichment and fraud of the authorities at the cost of the hunger of our troops. The theft of clothing, tips and food from our soldiers is scandalous. The entire budget for teacher and police payments is embezzled by high officials […] The young military generations refuse to contaminate ourselves with the putrefaction of a High Command lacking in honor.

What began as a movement of patriotic protest against the government's incapable policy led to the founding and establishment of a Federal Amazonian State, with its own government, army and currency but without ignoring itself as part of Peru. When the conflict was inevitable, Cervantes' troops marched on two fronts: blocking the passage from La Libertad to San Martín and blocking access to the Ucayali river, which connects Pucallpa with Iquitos, the new capital of the Federal State.

=== Disappearance ===
By early 1922 the situation was unfavorable to the revolutionaries, and on January 13, Iquitos, the proclaimed capital, had been captured by Peruvian troops. A few days earlier, on January 9, Cervantes had escaped, intending to reach Ecuador. The revolution would be quickly ended around the same time, and the region enjoyed some stability until a war in 1932, and another insurrection in 1956.

== See also ==
- Loretan Insurrection of 1896
- Juan Bustamante Dueñas
- Teodomiro Gutiérrez Cuevas
