= Federal State of Loreto =

Former self-proclaimed federated state within Peru

Federal State of Loreto Estado Federal de Loreto (Spanish)
- 1896
- Loreto within Peru in 1896
- Status: Unrecognised self-proclaimed federated state within Peru
- Capital: Iquitos
- Official languages: Spanish
- Demonym: Loretan
- Government: de facto autonomous federated state
- Leaders
  - 1896: Seminario y Aramburú and Mariano José Madueño
- Historical era: Aristocratic Republic
  - Beginning of the Loretan Insurrection: 2 May 1896
  - Defeat of Loretan forces: 10 July 1896
- Currency: Peruvian sol
Preceded by	Succeeded by
Department of Loreto	Department of Loreto

The Federal State of Loreto (Note: Spanish: Estado Federal de Loreto) was an unrecognised self-proclaimed federated state within Peru, that was proclaimed on 2 May 1896 during the Loretan Insurrection. It was formed from the Department of Loreto and existed as de facto autonomous region of the county. It was dissolved on 10 July 1896, after the rebellion was crushed by Peruvian forces. The state was proclaimed in order to gain more autonomy for the region as well as to reform Peru into a federal state. Its capital was Iquitos.

== History ==
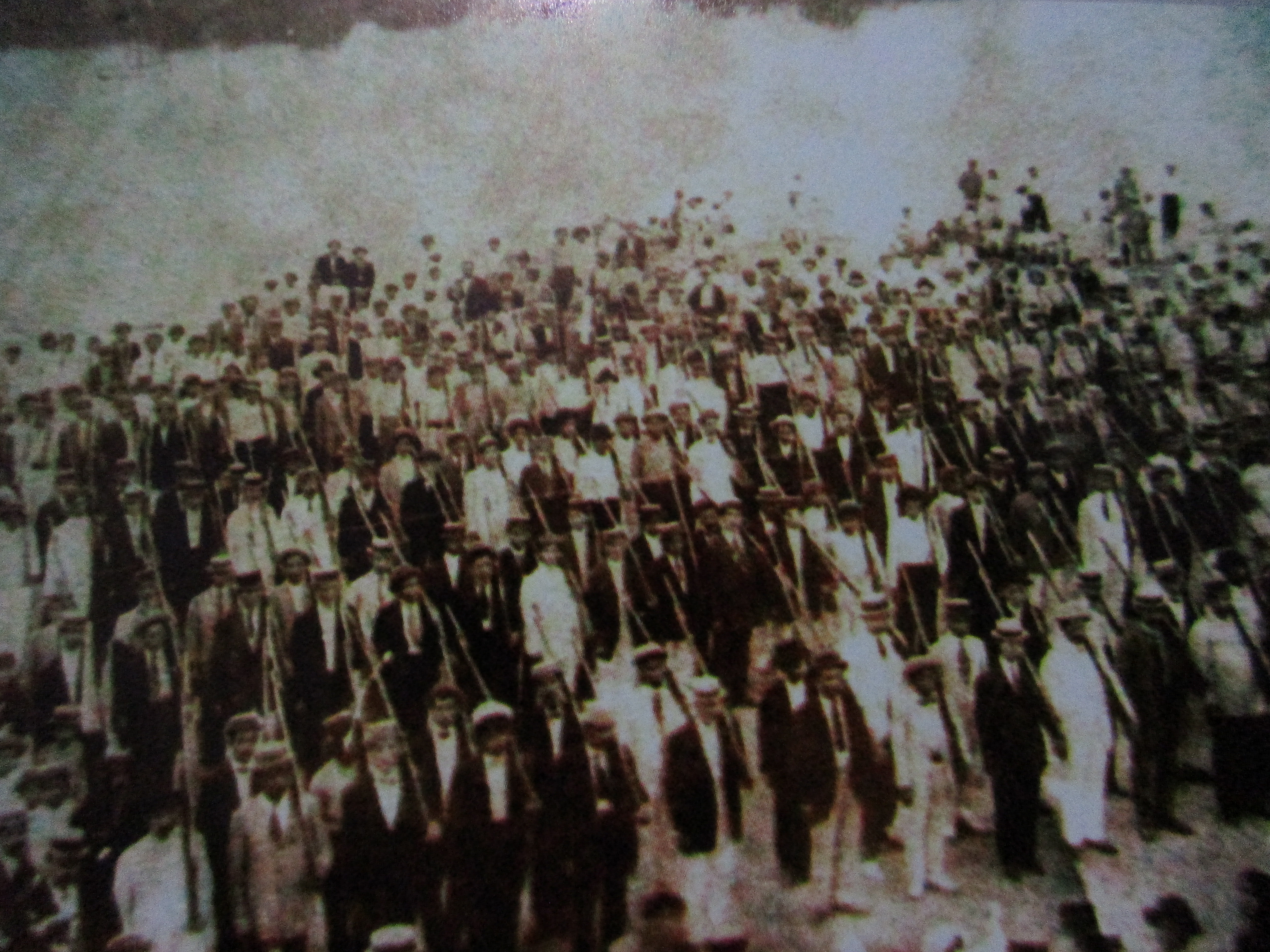
The Loretan insurgents in 1896.

The Department of Loreto was established on 7 February 1866 as one of the departments of Peru. It was separated from the Department of Amazonas. During the Amazon rubber boom, the region had experienced enormous economic growth, making the city of Iquitos, one of the most important centres of latex export, to the detriment of the department's capital, Moyobamba. Additionally, the feeling of abandonment by the Peruvian government, as well as threats from neighbouring countries had contributed to the development of a feeling of disconnect from the rest of Peru among the local population.

During the electoral campaign during the 1895 Peruvian presidential election, the candidate, Nicolás de Piérola had expressed his support in implanting the federalist system in the country. However, after becoming the president, Piérola had supported the centralist system instead.

On 2 May 1896, colonel Ricardo Seminario y Aramburú, together with a military member, Mariano José Madueño, had proclaimed the Federal State of Loreto, as a first step towards the establishment of the federal system in Peru. On 8 May, the state had signed a provisional constitution. The constitution stated that the Federal State of Loreto was an integral part of Peru, and recognized that articles of the Peruvian constitution had applied within the state. By 2 June, the movement had spread to the cities of Yurimaguas and Moyobamba. Following that, political organizations and public offices were established in those cities.

News about the state proclamation reached Lima, the capital of Peru, on 18 May 1896. The information came from Rio de Janeiro, being relayed through Pará. Nicolás de Piérola, the president of Peru, had ordered to organize three expeditions to counterattack the insurgents. The two of them went by land, one headed from Chiclayo to Cajamarca, and then traveling by the river to Moyobamba, while second, traveled by railway and then by boat on Pichis River. The third expedition of 292 men, had traveled on board of Constitución gunboat, crossing the Strait of Magellan and then entering the Amazon River on 29 June. The last expedition didn't arrive on time. The insurgent forces lacked local support and had been defeated by the land expeditions on 10 July 1898. On 16 July, it had been reported in Lima that the leaders of the rebellion had fled the country.

== See also ==
- Jungle Nation
- Third Federal State of Loreto
- Republic of Acre

== Bibliography ==
- Frederica Barclay Rey de Castro, El Estado Federal de Loreto, 1896. Centralismo, descentralización y federalismo en el Perú, a fines del siglo XIX. ISBN 978-9972-623-61-5.
- James B. Minahan, Encyclopedia of Stateless Nations: Ethnic and National Groups around the World, 2nd Edition
