= Third Federal State of Loreto =

Former self-proclaimed federated state within Peru

Third Federal State of Loreto Tercer Estado Federal de Loreto (Spanish)
- 1921–1922
- Loreto within Peru in 1921
- Status: Unrecognised self-proclaimed federated state within Peru
- Capital: Iquitos
- Official languages: Spanish
- Demonym: Loretan
- Government: De jure autonomous federated state
- Leader
  - 1921–1922: Guillermo Cervantes
- Historical era: Leguía presidency
  - Insurrection declared: 5 August 1921
  - Peruvian forces occupy Iquitos: 13 January 1922
- Currency: Cervantine banknotes (Note: The self-proclaimed federal government withdrew twenty-thousand Peruvian pounds, which were then redistributed in "provisional" banknotes made out of cardboard.)
Preceded by	Succeeded by
Department of Loreto	Department of Loreto

The Third Federal State of Loreto (Note: Spanish: Tercer Estado Federal de Loreto) was an unrecognised self-proclaimed federated state within Peru that was proclaimed during an insurrection in 1921 headed by Peruvian captain, Guillermo Cervantes. It was formed from the Department of Loreto and existed as de facto autonomous region of the country. It was dissolved in 1922, after the rebellion was crushed by Peruvian forces. The state was one of many attempts proclaimed in order to gain more autonomy for the region as well as reform Peru into a federal state. Its capital was Iquitos.

== History ==
The state was proclaimed in 1921 in response to the region's perceived neglect on the part of the Peruvian government, in both trade and its intent of ceding cerritory to Colombia, by local Peruvian captain Guillermo Cervantes Vásquez, who had participated in a conflict against Colombia in 1911. The provisional government, headed in Iquitos, soon expanded its control to the departments of Amazonas and San Martin. On its second day of existence, the rebel authorities authorized the distribution of provisional banknotes made out of cardboard used by locals as currency. Martial law and a curfew were declared, and local ports were ordered shut, with local trade and navigation being tightly controlled.

The revolution was quickly accepted by the local population, but was met negatively by Peru's president Augusto Leguía, who sent a few troops to the area, and shut down trade to the region. The local guerrillas' military inferiority soon became apparent, and by early 1922, a famished Iquitos had been occupied by Peruvian troops headed by Peruvian Captain Genaro Matos, while Cervantes had escaped on January 9 and sought refuge in the Ecuadorian jungle and his army soon became little more than an insurgency.

== See also ==
- Federal State of Loreto, a similar attempt in 1896.
- Jungle Nation, a separatist state proclaimed in 1899.
