= Jungle Nation =

Short-lived unrecognized state in South America

Jungle Nation Nación Selvática (Spanish)
- 1899–1900
- De jure map of the Jungle Republic
- Capital: Moyobamba
- Official languages: Spanish
- Demonym: Loretan
- Supreme Leader
  - 1899–1900: Emilio Vizcarra
- Historical era: Aristocratic Republic
  - Proclamation of independence: 22 May 1899
  - Death of Vizcarra: 27 February 1900
- Currency: Peruvian sol
Preceded by	Succeeded by
Peru	Peru

The Jungle Nation, (Note: Spanish: Nación Selvática) also known as the Jungle Republic, (Note: Spanish: República Selvática) was an unrecognised state that existed between 1899 and 1900 in the modern territory of Peru, within the departments of Loreto, San Martín, and Ucayali. It was proclaimed on 22 May 1899, by colonel Emilio Vizcarra, who then acquired the title of the Supreme Leader. The state was formed from the territory of Department of Loreto, Peru. It was reincorporated into Peru in 1900, shortly after the death of Vizcarra on 27 February 1900.

== History ==
In 1896, colonels Eduardo Jessup and Emilio Vizcarra led the land campaign from Cajamarca to intervene in the Loretan Insurrection, fighting against the forces of self-proclaimed Federal State of Loreto. The rebellion was defeated on 10 July 1896, with Federal State being reincorporated into Peru. Following that, Vizcarra was appointed by the Peruvian government, as the prefect of the re-established Department of Loreto. The regional Loretan identity and social chaos were still present among the public, and Vizcarra eventually, started sharing the pro-regional views.

On 22 May 1899, Vizcarra had announced the independence of the Department of Loreto as a sovereign state, called Jungle Nation. He also titled himself the Supreme Leader of said country. The businessman Juan Jiménez Pimentel had financed his political campaign across the state. Eduardo López de Romaña, the president of Peru, in the reaction to the declaration, had ordered colonel Teobaldo Gutiérrez to siege the southern territory of the self-proclaimed state, now located within the Department of San Martín. The reaction of the neighbouring countries of Brazil, Colombia, and Ecuador, was indifferent.

On 27 February 1900, while on a tour across Loretan cities to appoint new authorities, Vizcarra got involved in a civil revolt at the Plaza de Armas square in Moyobamba. The revolt was the response to the abuse carried out by Vizcarra's militias against the local population. During the fighting, the supreme leader was lethally hit with a rock in the head, by a woman with the surname Tapullima. Following his death, the state had fallen a few days later and has been reincorporated into Peru.

== See also ==
- Federal State of Loreto
- Third Federal State of Loreto

== Bibliography ==
- Frederica Barclay Rey de Castro, El Estado Federal de Loreto, 1896. Centralismo, descentralización y federalismo en el Perú, a fines del siglo XIX. ISBN 978-9972-623-61-5.
- Pilar García Jordán, Núria Sala i Vila, La nacionalización de la Amazonía
