= Teodomiro Gutiérrez Cuevas =

Peruvian general (1861-c. 1936)

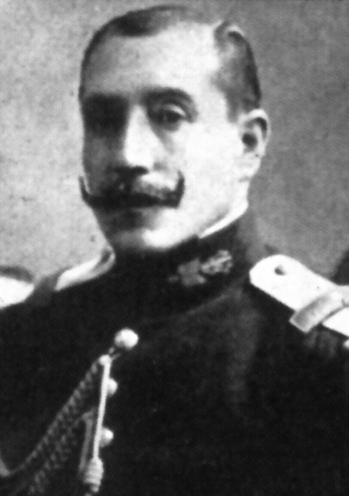
- Born: 25 July 1861; Cerro de Pasco, Junín, Peru
- Died: c. 1936–1937; Bolivia or Peru
- Military career
- Allegiance: Peru
- Branch: Peruvian Army
- Service years: c. 1879–1895; 1906–1908; c. 1913–1936
- Rank: Cavalry major
- Units: Gendarmerie Regiment of Lima; Carabineers of Cañete
- Conflicts: War of the Pacific: Lima Campaign; Battle of Miraflores; Breña Campaign; First Battle of Pucará; Second Battle of Pucará; Peruvian Civil War of 1894–1895 1915 Puno Rebellion

Teodomiro A. Gutiérrez Cuevas, also known by his pseudonym Rumi Maqui (Quechua for hand of stone), was a Peruvian Army Major and Indigenous leader who led a rebellion in Puno in 1915. After his imprisonment, he escaped his prison in Arequipa in January 1917.

== Early life ==
Gutiérrez was born on July 25, 1861 (other sources date his birth to the year 1864) in Cerro de Pasco, then in the Department of Junín, to Dr. Julián R. Gutiérrez and Beatriz Cuevas, daughter of an Argentine lawyer. He was admitted to the Methodist Episcopal Church on December 27, 1914, after which he maintained an active role, writing articles for the church's publications on some occasions.

== Military career ==
Gutiérrez joined the Peruvian Army at the age of 15 and participated in the War of the Pacific. After the Chilean Army's successful Lima Campaign, the city of Lima was occupied by Chilean troops. During the battle for the city, he fought in the Battle of Miraflores. Gutiérrez collaborated at first with Francisco García Calderón's administration, only to later participate in the Breña Campaign, under the command of General Andrés Avelino Cáceres, who he admired.

After the war with Chile, Gutiérrez fought on Cáceres' side during the Peruvian Civil War of 1894–1895. After Cáceres' defeat, Gutiérrez accompanied him in his exile to Argentina, along with others who did not accept the amnesty of 1895. One year later in Argentina, he wrote to Nicolás de Piérola accusing the government of Chile of orchestrating the insurrection in Loreto, offering his military service if it became a necessity. By 1899, he appeared on army documents again, and by 1908 he was retired from the army, with him appearing again in 1913 as a sergeant major and in 1916 as a major.

== Political career ==
Gutiérrez had an extensive political career, serving as subprefect of Canta Province, then Chucuito District from 1903 to 1904, and of Huancayo Province from October 1906 to August 1907. He was also a devout member of the Constitutional Party. During his tenure in Chucuito, he expressed his disapproval at the treatment the local Indians were subjected to, writing letters of protest on more than one occasion, but maintaining a neutral and hopeful outlook at the time, and suppressing Indian insurrections when needed.

In 1913, he was sent by President Guillermo Billinghurst to Huancané and Azángaro in Puno as a special commissioner to collect a detailed report on the situation of the haciendas and peasants in the department of Puno, then an area engulfed by protests.

After Billinghurst was deposed in a coup d'état in 1914 by Óscar R. Benavides, he was exiled to Chile, where Gutiérrez soon followed, establishing himself in Valparaíso. He would secretly return to Peru some months later in order to plan his rebellion.

== Puno Rebellion ==
In late 1914, during his stay in Peru, Gutiérrez adopted the name Rumi Maqui, Quechua for hand of stone. He also named himself as the General and Supreme Director of the indigenous peoples and army of the Federal State of Tahuantinsuyo (Spanish: General y Supremo Director de los pueblos y ejército indígenas del Estado Federal del Tahuantinsuyo). By this point, Gutiérrez had also adopted anarchist ideas, his intent of restoring the Inca Empire, and had begun his military training of the Indians of Puno.

A wave of attacks against farm owners by Indians soon followed on the same year. On December 10, 1915, the San José hacienda, owned by farmer Bernardino Arias Echenique, was attacked by Gutiérrez's forces. Police forces soon faced the group, killing 20 men in the process.

In late 1916, Gutiérrez's house in Arequipa was raided and Gutiérrez arrested and imprisoned, being sentenced for treason.

On January 1, 1917, taking advantage of the new year celebrations, Gutiérrez escaped prison after serving for eight months. A letter explaining the reasons for his rebellion was published later the same month by La Lucha, a local newspaper. He had apparently reached Bolivia, where he had set fire to a hacienda in the country with the assistance of Tomás Condori, a follower of his.

== Later life ==
After his escape from prison, Gutiérrez spent the rest of his life in hiding, and very little became known of him. Peruvian writer Augusto Ramos Zambrano, who wrote extensively about Gutiérrez, claims he wrote to President Luis Miguel Sánchez Cerro for a pension, which was approved, and later died in Potosí in 1937.

His project for Peru and Bolivia, the Great South American Confederation of the Pacific (Spanish: Gran Confederación Sudamericana del Pacífico), which was to be headed by himself and his allies, was never realized.

== Legacy ==
The 1915 rebellion and Gutiérrez himself established themselves in early 20th century Peru, with journalists and writers, such as José Carlos Mariátegui, Clemente Palma and Jorge Basadre writing articles about him. He was also an important name in the Indigenismo movement.

Some contemporary writers, such as Alberto Flores Galindo, have suggested that the pseudonym Rumi Maqui was used to identify several Indian rebels in the region, and not only Gutiérrez, also arguing against his role in the insurrection, and even the severity of the rebellion itself. This, however, has been disputed by others.

== See also ==
- Guillermo Cervantes
- Juan Bustamante Dueñas
