= Juan Bustamante Dueñas =

Peruvian indigenous leader who led a rebellion

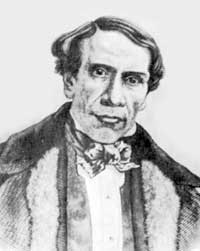

Deputy of Lampa
- In office April 16, 1845 – November 17, 1847
- In office July 14, 1855 – November 2, 1857

Prefect of Cuzco
- In office June 29, 1864 – August 8, 1864

Personal details
- Born: 24 June 1808 Vilque, Viceroyalty of Peru
- Died: January 3, 1868 (aged 59) Pusi, Peru

Military service
- Allegiance: Peru
- Branch/service: Peruvian Army
- Years of service: 1854–1855, 1866–1867
- Rank: Colonel
- Battles/wars: Liberal Revolution: Battle of La Palma; Chincha Islands War: Battle of Callao; Peruvian Civil War of 1867: 1867–68 Puno Rebellion

Juan Bustamante Dueñas, allegedly also known as Túpac Amaru III, was a Peruvian indigenous leader who led a rebellion that lasted from 1867 to 1868.

== Early life ==
Bustamante was the son of Mariano Bustamante y Jiménez, a former royalist army officer, and Agustina Dueñas y Vera, who claimed to be a descendant of Túpac Amaru I and owned extensive agricultural properties. He grew up in a wealthy home, despite which, he was able to witness the poverty of the local Indians and show solidarity with them. His first studies were in his hometown and then in Arequipa.

He made a great wealth with his wool business and the administration of his farm, known as Urquinamuni. He financed the construction of two bridges, one over the Cabanillas River and the other over the Pucará River. He traveled twice to Europe and wrote two books where he recounted these adventures, works in which his social preaching in favor of the Indians was already glimpsed.

== Political and military career ==
He was elected deputy for Lampa Province between 1845 and 1853 and from 1849 to 1850. He joined the liberal rebels in 1854, led by Ramón Castilla, participating in the Battle of La Palma. In 1855 he was also a member, representing the same province, of the National Convention of 1855–1857. In his legislative work, he stood out for presenting reform projects for the army and for the defense of the Indians. He was also Mayor of Lima and in that role, he increased the waters of the Rímac River.

On June 29, 1864, under the government of Juan Antonio Pezet, he was appointed prefect of the department of Cuzco. While holding this position, he sanctioned many landowners for abuses committed against their indigenous workers, which led to his dismissal on August 8 of the same year, accused of exceeding his duties.

During the Chincha Islands War, he equipped and trained a regiment made up of his own workers, with whom he went to Arequipa to join the war effort. The dictator Mariano Ignacio Prado awarded him the rank of colonel. He was in the Battle of Callao on May 2, 1866. At that time he sold his hacienda to his settlers, carrying out the first agrarian reform in Peru.

In 1867, in the company of other notable people, he founded the Sociedad Amiga de los Indios in Lima, whose presidency was entrusted to General José Miguel Medina. He was accused of instigating the indigenous rebellions that then broke out in the mountains, the most serious being that of Huancané, in Puno. It was said that he engineered the seditions from Lima. The truth is that Bustamante assumed the defense of the Indian communities and became their spokesman before the Constituent Congress of 1867, promising to obtain laws that would protect them from abuses and that fair contributions would be applied to them.

At the request of the landowners, the government sent an army under the command of General Baltazar Caravedo, with the mission of subduing the indigenous revolt. But Caravedo refused to exercise repression and preferred dialogue. On October 20, 1867, in Huancané, Bustamante reached an agreement with General Caravedo, who withdrew with his troops to Lima. The landowners accused Caravedo of complicity with the Indians and promoted a revolt against the government of Mariano Ignacio Prado, limited to the constitutional revolution of 1867, which demanded the abolition of the 1867 Constitution and the return of the 1860 Constitution.

== Puno Rebellion ==
Bustamante, who due to the circumstances found himself on the side of the government's defenders, did not want to limit himself to that factional fight and began a movement of social vindication, putting himself at the head of his so-called peasant armies. He presented himself as heir to the Inca emperor with the mission of restoring the Inca Empire, for which there was no other way than to expel or exterminate the whites. It is said that he adopted the name of Túpac Amaru III.

The insurrection spread through Chupa, Putina, Samán, Azángaro and Lampa. On December 30, 1867, Bustamante occupied the city of Puno. Due to differences with his supporters, he was unable to exploit these advantages, while the forces of the sub-prefect of Azángaro, Andrés Recharte, advanced against him. Bustamante had to withdraw from Puno on January 1, going to Pusi, where on the 2nd he was defeated and captured by Recharte.

On January 2, 1868, 71 of his supporters were locked in straw huts, which were burned down on the morning of January 3. Bustamante was forced to transfer the bodies to a common grave and later taken to the main square, where he was hung by his feet and beaten. He was finally beheaded.

== See also ==
- Teodomiro Gutiérrez Cuevas
- Guillermo Cervantes

== Bibliography ==
- Castañeda Murga, Juan (2000). Grandes Forjadores del Perú. Lima: Lexus Editores. ISBN 9972-625-50-8.
- Basadre Grohmann, Jorge (2005). Historia de la República del Perú (1822 - 1933). Vol. 6. Empresa Editora El Comercio S. A. ISBN 9972-205-68-1.
