= 1895 Peruvian presidential election =

- 1895
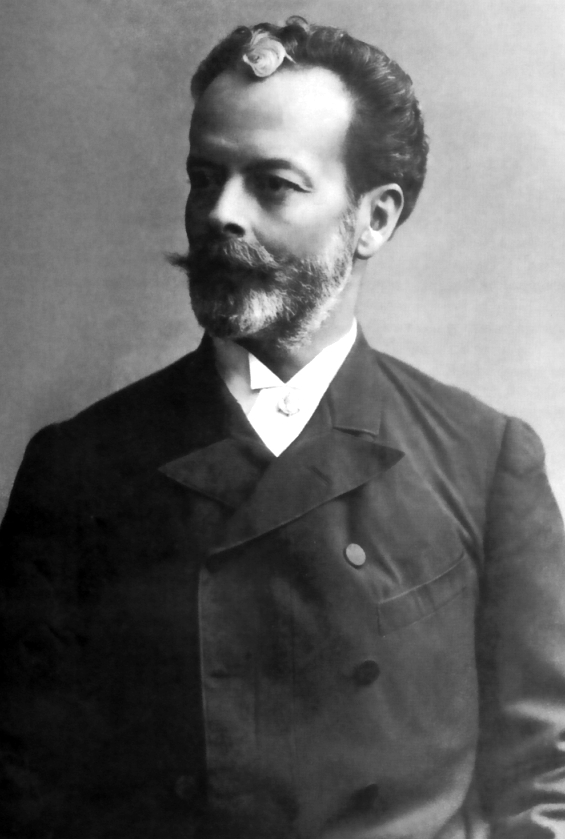
Candidate	Nicolás de Piérola
Party	Democratic
Popular vote	4,150
Percentage	100%
President before election
Manuel Candamo
Civilista Party
Elected President
Nicolás de Piérola
Democratic

Presidential elections were held in Peru in 1895. Nicolás de Piérola of the Democratic Party was elected unopposed.

== Results ==
Candidate	Party	Votes	%
Nicolás de Piérola	Democratic Party	4,150	100.00
Total		4,150	100.00
Valid votes		4,150	96.29
Invalid/blank votes		160	3.71
Total votes		4,310	100.00
Source: Tuesta
