= Loretan Insurrection of 1896 =

1896 failed rebellion against the government of Peru

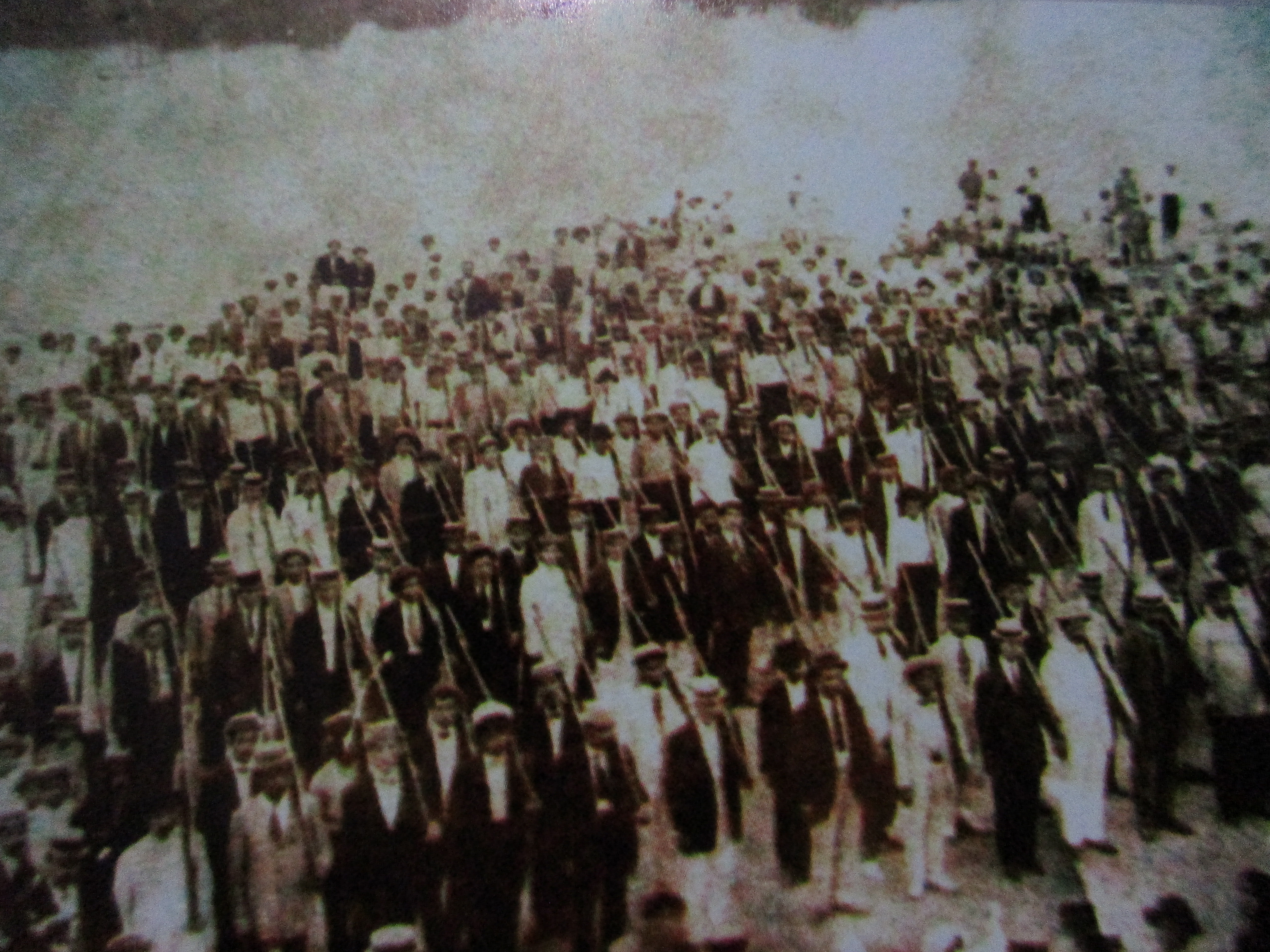
- Insurrect troops in 1896
Date	2 May – 10 July 1896
Location	Department of Loreto, Peru
Result	Government victory

Belligerents
Federal State of Loreto	Peru

Commanders and leaders
Mariano José Madueño; Ricardo Seminario y Aramburú	Eduardo Jessup; Emilio Vizcarra

Loretan Insurrection of 1896 (Note: Spanish: Insurrección loretana de 1896) was a rebellion of the population of the Department of Loreto against the government of Peru, fought from 2 May 1896 to 10 July 1896. During the insurrection, the population demanded federalization of Peru, and the reformation of Loreto into the autonomous state, which lead to self-proclamation of the Federal State of Loreto, a de facto autonomous region within Peru. On 10 July 1896, the rebellion was defeated by the government forces and the Federal State was disestablished.

== Background ==
The Department of Loreto was established on 7 February 1866 as one of the departments of Peru. It was separated from the Department of Amazonas. During the Amazon rubber boom, the region had experienced enormous economic growth, making the city of Iquitos, one of the most important centres of latex export, to the detriment of the department's capital, Moyobamba. Additionally, the feeling of abandonment by the Peruvian government, as well as threats from neighbouring countries had contributed to the development of a feeling of disconnect from the rest of Peru among the local population. During the electoral campaign during the 1895 Peruvian presidential election, the candidate, Nicolás de Piérola had expressed his support in implanting the federalist system in the country. However, after becoming the president, Piérola had supported the centralist system instead.

== The insurrection ==
On 2 May 1896, colonel Ricardo Seminario y Aramburú, together with a military member, Mariano José Madueño, had proclaimed the Federal State of Loreto, as a first step towards the establishment of the federal system in Peru. On 8 May, the state had signed a provisional constitution. The constitution stated that the Federal State of Loreto was an integral part of Peru, and recognized that articles of the Peruvian constitution had applied within the state. By 2 June, the movement had spread to the cities of Yurimaguas and Moyobamba. Following that, political organizations and public offices were established in those cities.

News about the state proclamation reached Lima, the capital of Peru, on 18 May 1896. The information came from Rio de Janeiro, being relayed through Pará. Nicolás de Piérola, the president of Peru, had ordered to organize three expeditions to counterattack the insurgents. The two of them went by land, one headed from Chiclayo to Cajamarca, and then traveling by the river to Moyobamba, while second, traveled by railway and then by boat on Pichis River. The third expedition of 292 men, had traveled on board of Constitución gunboat, crossing the Strait of Magellan and then entering the Amazon River on 29 June. The last expedition didn't arrive on time. The insurgent forces lacked local support and had been defeated by the land expeditions on 10 July 1898. On 16 July, it has been reported in Lima, that the leaders of the rebellion had fled the country.

== Bibliography ==
- Frederica Barclay Rey de Castro, El Estado Federal de Loreto, 1896. Centralismo, descentralización y federalismo en el Perú, a fines del siglo XIX. ISBN 978-9972-623-61-5.
- James B. Minahan, Encyclopedia of Stateless Nations: Ethnic and National Groups around the World, 2nd Edition
