= Battle of La Pedrera =

Battle during the border conflict between Peru and Colombia

- Part of the Colombian–Peruvian territorial dispute
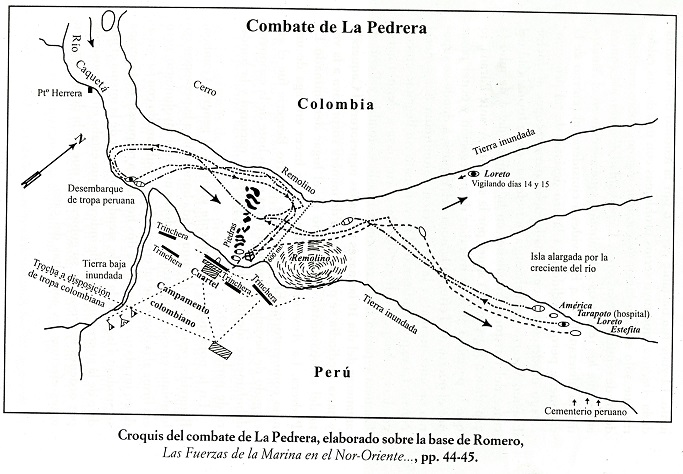
- Positions of the forces of Peru to the south and Colombia to the north of the Caquetá River, respectively, which functioned as a de facto border.
Date	10–12 July 1911
Location	La Pedrera
Result	Peruvian victory: Colombian troops retreat from La Pedrera; Peruvian troops soon also abandon their position; Peruvian dissatisfaction with the government increases, leading up to the Leticia Incident in 1932

Belligerents
Peru	Colombia

Commanders and leaders
Óscar Benavides; Manuel A. Clavero	José Isaías Gamboa †; Gabriel Valencia †

Strength
4 warships 200+ soldiers	110 soldiers most sick

Casualties and losses
27 dead and wounded	67 dead, wounded and ill

The Battle of La Pedrera was a conflict between Peru and Colombia that took place from 10–12 July 1911 in a disputed area surrounding the Putumayo River as part of a larger territorial dispute between both countries.

== Battle ==
The consuls of Peru and Colombia in Manaus, aware of the consequences of a possible confrontation, proposed to their governments the diversion of the expeditions, seeking that the Colombian expedition commanded by General Neira stop in Manaus, while the Peruvian, commanded of Commander Benavides, in Putumayo. However, due to lack of knowledge about these negotiations, the armed clash between the Peruvian and Colombian forces took place in La Pedrera between July 10 and 13.

The Colombian troops established in La Pedrera had created a permanent camp, which included crops and a set of trenches. Most of the Colombian soldiers became ill with malaria, yellow fever or leishmaniasis, which led to 11 becoming sick, 22 dying, and leaving 34 unfit for combat at the time of the confrontation.

On July 10, the Peruvian commander Óscar Benavides demanded the withdrawal of the Colombian forces, the refusal caused the first confrontation between both parties. 111 Colombian soldiers from the trenches repelled the attack of four river gunboats with 100 men, and after two hours of combat, the breakdown of the river gunboat América gave rise to Benavides' withdrawal. The next day, 23 Colombians managed to hold the position until the night. Thirty minutes before midnight, however, a new Peruvian attack was carried out which could not be successfully repelled by Gamboa.

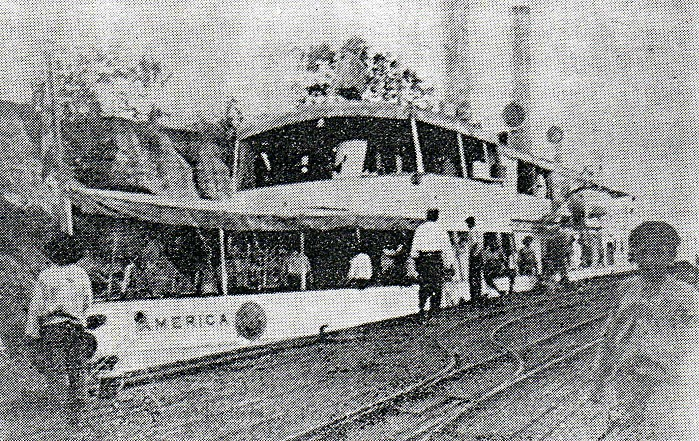
The Steamship BAP América photographed in Iquitos on July of 1911.

On July 12, the third and final day of the conflict, 43 Colombian soldiers fought successfully for most of the day, but General Gamboa passed out due to being ill while carrying a box of ammunition, being carried by his men. La Pedrera was consequently evicted and the Colombian troops were forced to withdraw.

== Aftermath ==
On July 19, 1911, a week after the clashes in La Pedrera, the Peruvian Minister Plenipotentiary Ernesto de Tezanos Pinto and the Colombian Foreign Minister Enrique Olaya Herrera signed the Tezanos Pinto-Olaya Herrera Agreement in Bogotá. In the agreement, Colombia undertook not to increase the contingent located in Puerto Córdoba and not to attack the Peruvian positions located between Putumayo and Caquetá. At the same time, the Peruvian troops were forced to abandon La Pedrera and return the captured war trophies to the Colombians.

In Colombia, the house of the Peruvian ambassador was stoned on October 4, with subsequent skirmishes and protests in the following days between both parties. On the other hand, the Peruvian forces suffered a fierce epidemic of beriberi and yellow fever that caused them to lose up to 30 men a day. This also gave rise to a reaction from Peruvian public opinion that demanded the permanence of their men in territory considered legitimately Peruvian. On October 16, the Peruvian troops withdrew from La Pedrera.

In Putumayo in 1911 there was no Colombian presence and Peru was the owner of both shores, where there were towns such as Tarapacá, Puerto Arica and Tacna. With regard to the presence of Colombia in these areas, it only occurs after 1930 with the ratification of the Salomón-Lozano Treaty, Colombia withdrew from the position it defended and both sides were decimated by jungle diseases. The conflict is little remembered in both countries. Peace was later signed between both nations, ratifying the Salomón-Lozano treaty of 1922.

== Bibliography ==
- Bustillo, Policarpo (1916). Reseña histórica de los límites entre Perú y Colombia. Mogollon.
- Porras Barrenechea, Raúl (1926). Historia de los límites del Perú. Librería Francesa Científica y Casa Editorial E. Rosay.
- Basadre Grohmann, Jorge (2005). Historia de la República del Perú (1822-1933). El Comercio. ISBN 9789972205743.
