= Gutiérrez Brothers' rebellion =

1872 coup d'état in Peru

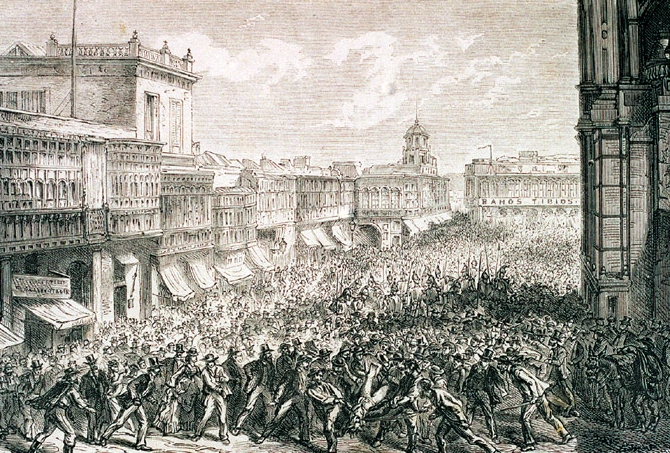
- A mob carries the body of Marceliano Gutiérrez
| Date | 22–26 July 1872 |
| Location | Lima |
| Result | Government victory: José Balta is overthrown and later executed on July 26; Three of the Gutiérrez brothers are ultimately killed; Manuel Pardo becomes president on August 2 |

Belligerents
| Government of Peru | Gutiérrez brothers |

Commanders and leaders
| José Balta (executed) Baltazar La Torre; José La Torre | Tomás Gutiérrez (surrendered) (executed); Silvestre Gutiérrez (surrendered) (executed); Marceliano Gutiérrez †; Marcelino Gutiérrez (surrendered) (POW) |

Units involved
| Peruvian Army; Peruvian Navy Crowds of armed civilians | Battalion "Pichincha" No. 2 Battalion "Zepita" No. 3 Battalion "Ayacucho" No. 4 |

The 1872 Peruvian coup d'état, known in Peruvian historiography as the Gutiérrez Brothers' rebellion (Spanish: Rebelión de los coroneles Gutiérrez), was a coup d'état headed by General Tomás Gutiérrez, then Minister of War, and his three brothers against then president José Balta, shortly before Manuel Pardo of the Civilista Party was to take office as the country's first civilian president. The coup was initially successful, although a violent crowd headed by brothers Baltazar and José La Torre ultimately murdered three of the Gutiérrez brothers.

== Background ==
=== The Gutiérrez brothers ===
The Gutiérrez brothers—Tomás, Silvestre, Marceliano and Marcelino—were four brothers who were originally from the Huancarqui area of Castilla Province in Arequipa and had joined the military, with Tomás distinguishing himself above the others. Peruvian historian Jorge Basadre describes them as follows:

Tomás was corpulent and had a reputation for being abrupt, impetuous, haughty, ignorant and determined; Marceliano distinguished himself by being even more of an athlete, more brusque and more ignorant, with a defect in his right eye, for which he was called the "one-eyed," and with a very powerful voice and an imposing presentation, which attracted the public on the days of troop maneuvering. Silvestre, thinner and whiter, with curly hair, had more intelligence and enlightenment, but he believed him to be hard and sinister. Marcelino, on the other hand, was distinguished by a peaceful character.

— Jorge Basadre

Of the brothers, Tomás had been the most distinguished: his signature appeared on both the document that started the Peruvian Civil War of 1867 and the constitution of that year. The commissions that Pedro Diez Canseco gave him in 1868 in Chiclayo and Huancayo gave him some renown as a sagacious man, complementing the great notoriety he had as a brave and good soldier. José Balta appointed him Inspector General of the Army, gave him the highest military position and proposed to Congress his promotion to general, thus ratifying the acts of Juan Antonio Pezet and Ramón Castilla. However, the respective law was not issued.

Silvestre and Marceliano were not as well known, with the former being remembered for his important role in Balta's revolt in the north that put him in power, being wounded in action in Chiclayo. The aforementioned brothers were put on trial for the crime of flagellation against Colonel Juan Manuel Garrido and watchman Luis Montejo, respectively. The former's trial caused a public scandal, being represented by Fernando Casós Flores. When in August 1871 the Supreme Court ruled against him, he was separated from his battalion, to which he returned shortly before the coup.

In 1872, 7,000 well-armed men were at the command of the Gutiérrez brothers' army in Lima, who exaggeratedly considered Pardo's presidency a disaster to their duties.

=== The 1872 elections ===
Balta, then in his final months as president of Peru, sought to continue the military's presence in the government, proposing General José Rufino Echenique for the 1872 elections against civilian Manuel Pardo of the Civilista Party, supported by a majority of Congress. Echenique, in consideration of the public's disapproval, declined Balta's nomination, with Balta instead supporting jurist Antonio Arenas, who was not popular with voters.

Both the elections and Balta's ending government were a turbulent period, as controversies arose, and Balta had repressed any opposition to his government, with the pro-Pardo newspapers El Nacional and El Comercio being shut down and their respective directors, Andrés Aramburú Sarrio and Manuel Amunátegui, imprisoned. The former was imprisoned in one of the barracks under one of the Gutiérrez brothers, who threatened him with death. Amunátegui was also threatened with an execution by firing squad if he decided to reopen his newspaper.

These controversial events caused the consecutive resignation of two of Balta's War Ministers (Juan Francisco Balta and José Allende), leading to Tomás Gutiérrez taking office on December 7, 1871. This appointment did not get Arenas' blessing, and its reception by the Civilista Party's press was that of alarm. Since Balta's presidency was the result of his revolt, and since the Gutiérrez brothers had provided his government with stability thus far, it was widely believed that Balta would launch a self-coup.

According to the confessions of Manuel Santa María to Echenique while the two took refuge in the same legation during the coup, Balta initially supported the coup d'état plan. However, after seeking advice from friends of his, such as Henry Meiggs, he changed his mind on the issue.

== Coup ==
=== July 22 ===
On the morning of July 22, 1872, Balta met with Tomás Gutiérrez and definitively refused any subversive action in what was described as a "stormy scene." According to some witnesses, his brother Silvestre acted on his mood, urging him to proceed with the coup as the Congress was on the eve of concluding their qualifying tasks, and Pardo's presidency would begin on August 2.

At 2 p.m., Silvestre, at the head of two companies of the Pichincha battalion, entered the Government Palace and arrested President Balta in the presence of his wife and daughter Daría, who was to be married that afternoon. Meanwhile at the Plaza de Armas, Marceliano—in command of the Zepita battalion—proclaimed his brother Tomás as Supreme Chief of the Republic, in the rank of General of the Army. Balta was moved to the San Francisco barracks (also called the San Francisco de Asís barracks), and his brother Pedro, married to one of the Gutiérrez sisters, expressed his disbelief when he learned that the president was not involved in the coup. Meanwhile, Tomás asked for the support of the armed forces and accused Balta of being unfit for the presidency, while refusing to cede the office to a criminal, alluding to Balta's trial in London with a Guano company. Only some politicians (such as Fernando Casós, who served as Secretary General) and members of the Army agreed to support him. and The Congress prepared a statement condemning the events, and was later interrupted in the evening by Major José Luis Elcorrobarrutia. Rufino Echenique, president of the Senate, told his colleagues where and when to meet clandestinely to continue debating.

Meanwhile, another detachment unsuccessfully searched Pardo's home to detain him, as he had been warned of the events. He left the next day for the nearby southern coast, where, aboard a fishing boat, he was picked up by Miguel Grau aboard the Huáscar. He was moved to the Independencia shortly after, as Grau's ship kept sailing south in order to form a resistance movement.

=== July 23 ===
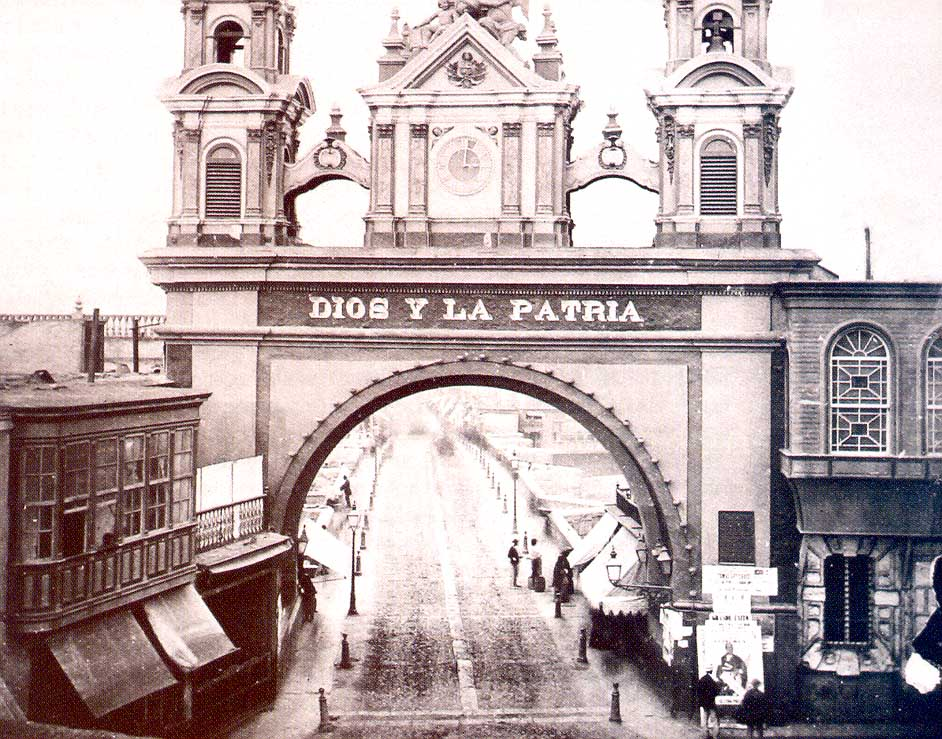
The Gate of Lima in 1872, with a pro-Gutiérrez poster to the right of its entrance.

The Pardista newspapers remained closed on this date, stores were half-closed, and some newspapers, such as La Sociedad and La Patria, paid no attention to the revolt. Telegrams accepting the new order reached the capital from provinces such as Piura, Trujillo, Ica and Chincha, signed by local military authorities. The Navy issued a statement which made it clear that they would not support the new regime. This statement was signed by notable figures, such as Miguel Grau.

In the afternoon, Tomás Gutiérrez summoned Fernando Casós Flores and offered him the office of Secretary General, which he accepted. Casós later claimed that he opposed the coup and accepted the office to avoid an ultramontanist and strict military dictatorship. He obtained Gutiérrez's guarantee that he would handle all political aspects of the government, while Gutiérrez would oversee all military affairs. He also obtained his guarantee that the city's legations, then filled with refugees, would be respected. Casós summoned the city's bank managers requesting funds that later disappeared.

=== July 24 and 25 ===
On these dates some desertions took place, and civil servants had, by this point, abandoned their offices. The Civilista Party was accused of wasting their money and alcohol. On the night of July 24, desertions increased, with the soldiers handing their rifles to the locals. On the night of the 25th, people started cheering Pardo and shouting death chants against the Gutiérrez brothers. Gutiérrez and Casós issued a decree creating a special jury, claiming that subversive actions had been taking place against Gutiérrez's army, such as the issuing of false cheques and incitements to violence. On July 25, Silvestre quelled a rebellion in Callao, returning to Lima in the night.

=== July 26 ===
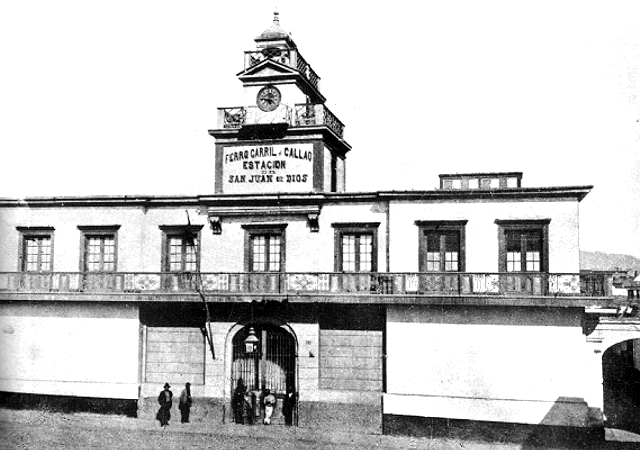
Silvestre was fatally shot at this train station, now demolished.

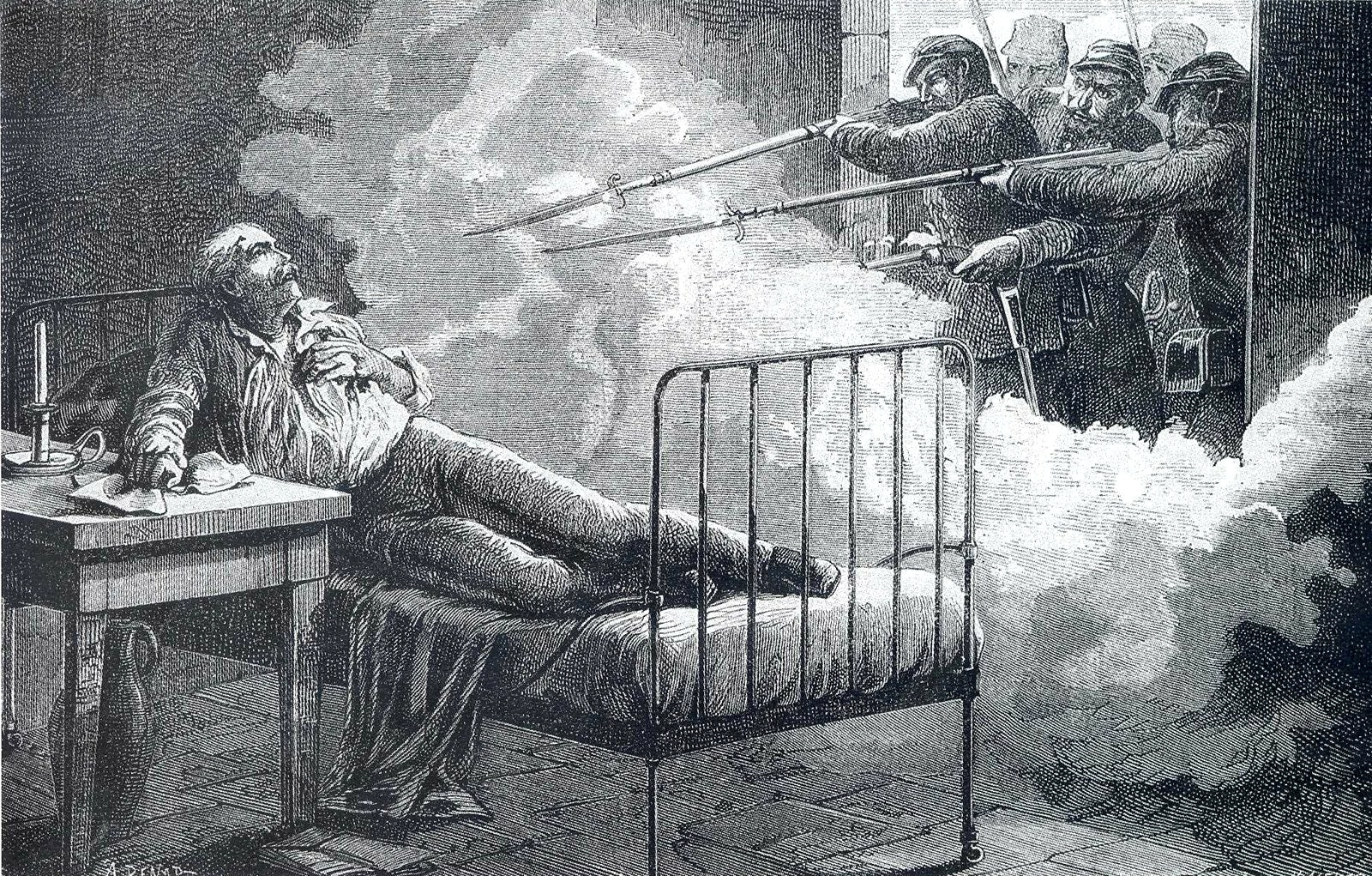
Balta is fatally shot in his bed.

On July 26, while taking the tram at San Juan de Dios Station, Silvestre got into a verbal altercation with a pro-Balta crowd, firing at them once with a revolver and wounding protestor Jaime Pacheco, who in turn shot him in the left arm. A shootout thus began, resulting in Captain Francisco Verdejo fatally shooting Gutiérrez in the head.

It is alleged that in retaliation, Marceliano Gutiérrez, who was guarding Balta in the San Francisco barracks, ordered the assassination of the imprisoned president, although such an assertion has not been proven. Nonetheless, Balta was riddled with bullets by three riflemen in the early afternoon, while he was resting in his bed after having lunch, and the news of his death quickly spread throughout Lima.

Seeing that the atmosphere had turned against him, Tomás Gutiérrez left the Government Palace and moved to the Santa Catalina barracks, where his brother, Colonel Marcelino Gutiérrez, was staying. There he suffered the siege of the population. The two brothers then decided to leave the barracks at night, amidst rifle and cannon fire. Meanwhile, the other brother, Marceliano, went to Callao to stop a revolt. During the events, while attempting to light a high-caliber cannon in the Real Felipe Fortress, he was fatally shot in the stomach. It is said that his last words were "another brave man dies" (Spanish: Muere otro valiente), and that the shot came from one of his own men. At 5:15 in the afternoon, part of the Gutiérrez army surrendered in the barracks.

The mob took over the Government Palace at 5:30 in the afternoon. While Marcelino took refuge in a friendly house at Mariquitas street, Tomás, recklessly, fled through the streets of Lima, with his face covered and wearing a civilian hat, shouting "Viva Pardo" with the intention of going unnoticed. To his bad luck, he ran into a group of officers who recognized him immediately. Upon being arrested, he claimed that he had been incited to rebel by prominent politicians and military men, who abandoned him and claimed to know nothing of the assassination of President Balta. They advanced a few blocks, while they were followed by a mob that shouted threats, and when they reached the La Merced square, the soldiers who arrested him could not protect him any further and hid him in a pharmacy, immediately closing the doors. The crowd broke through the doors and searched for Tomás, whom they found hiding in a tub. He was then shot dead, and his body taken out to the street. There, the corpse was undressed and shot, as well as slashed across the chest by an unknown man, who was alleged to have said, alluding to the presidential sash: "You want a sash? Take your sash."

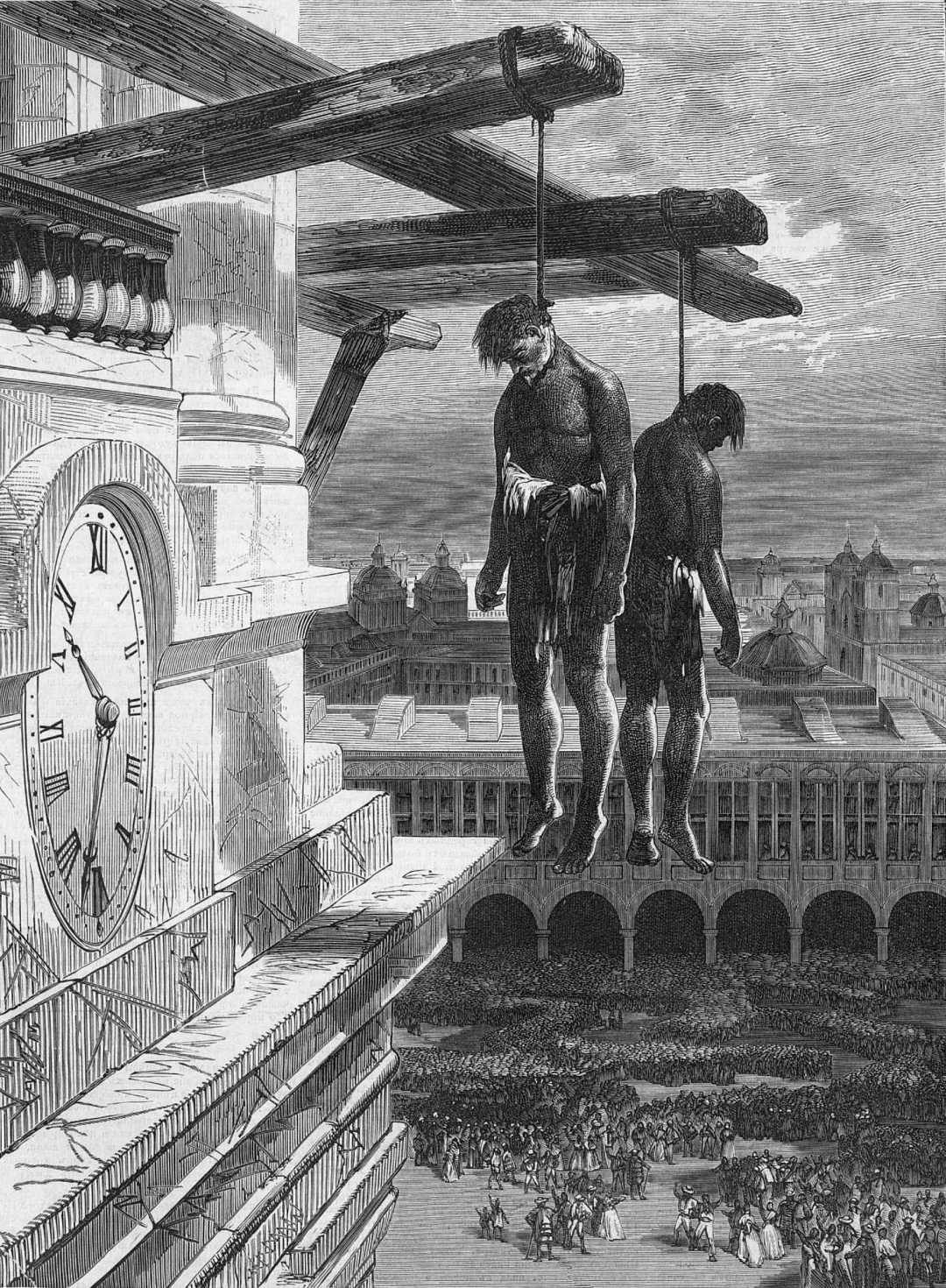
Tomás Gutiérrez and his brother Silvestre. Lima, 1872

He was immediately dragged into the plaza and hung from a lantern in front of the Portal de Escribanos. Hours later he was joined by the corpse of his brother Silvestre, brought from the nearby Church of the Orphans. Both bodies were then hanged from the towers of the Cathedral of Lima the following day, naked and covered with wounds, at a height of more than 20 meters; a spectacle never before seen in the capital. Hours later the ropes that supported them were broken, the bodies falling to the ground, which crashed against the sidewalk. The remains were burned in a bonfire located at the center of the square, made from wood taken from Silvestre's bakery on Calle Pescadería (currently Carabaya, next to Government Palace, in the path towards the train station) that was destroyed by the crowd, and in the afternoon a third corpse was thrown into the fire, that of Marceliano.

The brothers' houses were also affected. Tomás's house, located at the Calle de Ortiz (currently the third block of Huancavelica street, between Torrico and Cailloma), was looted and reduced to rubble in both the inside and outside. Another building—a home and a bakery—belonging to Marceliano also suffered the same fate, this one located at the corner of Calle de las Campanas and Breña streets, under the bridge (first block of Marañón, between Trujillo and Chiclayo. According to El Nacional, in addition to the aforementioned, the windows and doors of Tomás's house were removed, and water was poured into the building to turn it into a barren terrain. Tomás's wife was hidden at her mother's house, in the Calle de la Concha (third block of Jirón Ica, where the Municipal Theatre is located). A jewelry store belonging to a Mr. Leveratto in the Calle Espaderos (fifth block of the Jirón de la Unión) was also attacked, with some claiming Tomás was inside. The house that was looted, number 69, later housed the headquarters of the newspaper La Tradición; Marceliano's home and bakery later was rebuilt with the numbers of 185 and 199. Marcelino's home, located at the Peña Horadada street, in Barrios Altos, was left untouched.

=== July 27 ===
A day after the violent events, Manuel Pardo made his entrance into the capital and assumed the presidency of the country on August 2, 1872. He then made a speech that began with the words:

People of Lima! What you've done is a terrible act, but nevertheless an act of justice.

== Aftermath ==
The weekly publication El Americano, published in Paris with Uruguayan journalist Héctor Florencio Varela as its director, published a complete chronicle of this revolt under the title "Revolución de Lima" (Revolution in Lima), which served as an extremely important reference for documentation of the event as it was published shortly after the revolt.

The only one of the Gutiérrez brothers who managed to save himself was Marcelino, described as the most peaceful of the brothers, who took refuge in a friendly house for either two or three days, later moving to the home of the Brazilian minister Felipe José Pereira Leal for eight days, and thus managed to save himself from being lynched. Marcelino coordinated with his wife, with her reaching Callao first, and him travelling accompanied by a friendly colonel. An assistant of the prefecture detained him, directing him to then Prefect, Colonel Javier de Osma, with his wife later joining him alongside the aforementioned assistant. He was prohibited from boarding a ship and detained.

Captured days later, he served prison for some time and was released by an amnesty law; he then moved back to his hometown and in 1879 participated in War of the Pacific, rehabilitating himself. He later died in Arequipa of tuberculosis in 1904.

The four-day regime of Tomás Gutiérrez did not halt the increasing control of civilians in the Peruvian government. Just one week after Gutiérrez's overthrow, Pardo assumed the presidency and his party, the Civilista Party, would be a dominant force in Peruvian politics for decades to come.

An Argentine diplomat in the city claimed that three quarters of the city's population took part in the violent events that ended the brothers' lives, with total impunity.

== See also ==
- Manuel Pardo (politician)
