= Silvestre Gutiérrez =

Peruvian colonel (1826–1872)

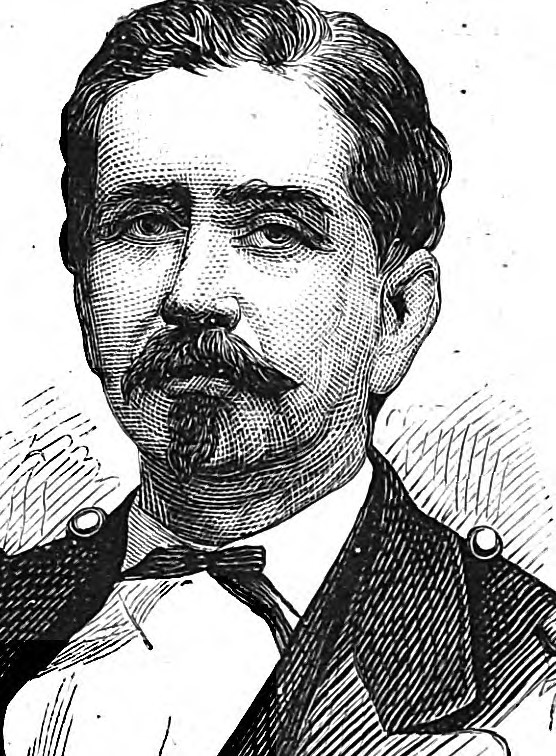
- Portrait from La Ilustración Española y Americana
- Born: December 30, 1826; Arequipa, Peru
- Died: July 26, 1872 (aged 45); Lima, Peru
- Military career
- Allegiance: Peruvian Army
- Service years: ?–1872
- Rank: Colonel
- Nickname: Cabeza rota
- Commands: Battalion "Pichincha" No. 2
- Conflicts: 1867 Balta Rebellion (WIA); 1872 coup d'état †

Manuel Silvestre Gutiérrez Chávez (Arequipa; December 30, 1826 — Lima; July 26, 1872) was a Peruvian colonel that participated in the coup d'état headed by his brother Tomás Gutiérrez against then president José Balta on July 22, 1872, dying in the events that took place four days later.

== Early life ==
Gutiérrez was born in Arequipa to a family of Spanish descent in March 1817, the son of parents Luis Gutiérrez and Julia Chávez. He enlisted, along with his three brothers in the Peruvian Army, with Tomás distinguishing himself above the others. He was described by historian Jorge Basadre as having frizzy hair and being fairer, more intelligent and enlightened than his brothers but thought to be "harsh and sinister."

== Military career ==
Silvestre had a less distinguished career than Tomás, starting in the 1850s, in the wars and revolutions of Peru. Silvestre was barely remembered for his performance alongside José Balta during the Chiclayo revolution: seriously injured in the head, he received the nickname "broken head" (Spanish: Cabeza rota) ever since.

In April 1870, both Silvestre and Marceliano were put on trial, accused separately of flagellation. Silvestre had Colonel Juan Manuel Garrido arrested, to whom he applied two hundred lashes. Marceliano, in turn, ordered the guard Luis Montejo to be flogged. Of the two trials, Silvestre's caused a public scandal. Lawyer Fernando Casós Flores defended Silvestre. In August 1871 the Supreme Court issued an adverse ruling against Silvestre, so he was separated from the battalion he commanded; However, he returned shortly after to assume command of it.

=== Coup d'état ===
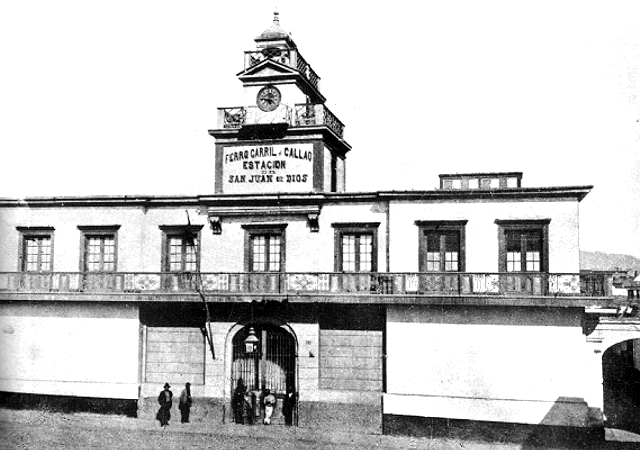
Silvestre was fatally shot in the head at this train station.

The Gutiérrez colonels, dissatisfied with the triumph of Manuel Pardo, the first civilian to win the presidential elections in 1872, plotted a coup against President José Balta. Previously, they tried to convince the president to annul the elections, to no avail. Then Silvestre convinced Tomás to carry out the coup plan once and for all, given that there were only a few days left before the change of command would take place. The plan was then carried out at 2 p.m. of July 22, with Silvestre taking control of Government Palace and capturing Balta. Four days later, while taking the tram at San Juan de Dios Station, he got into an altercation with a pro-Balta crowd, firing at them once with a revolver and wounding protestor Jaime Pacheco, who in turn shot him in the left arm. A shootout thus began, resulting in Captain Francisco Verdejo fatally shooting Gutiérrez in the head. His body was taken to the nearby Church of the Orphans, but was later dragged out and hanged from a lamppost next to Tomás at the Plaza de Armas, and then again hanged from the Cathedral, being later burned in a bonfire alongside two of his brothers. Only Marcelino survived, who rehabilitated himself by fighting in the War of the Pacific.

== See also ==
- Tomás Gutiérrez
- Marceliano Gutiérrez
- Marcelino Gutiérrez
