= Marceliano Gutiérrez =

Peruvian colonel (1834–1872)

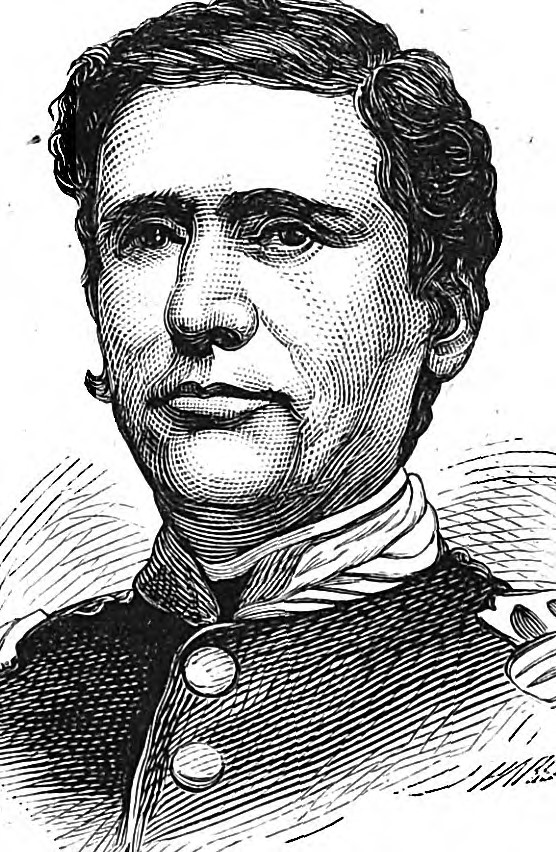
- Portrait from La Ilustración Española y Americana
- Born: June 17, 1834; Huancarqui, Peru
- Died: July 26, 1872 (aged 38); Callao, Peru
- Military career
- Allegiance: Peruvian Army
- Service years: ?–1872
- Rank: Colonel
- Commands: Battalion "Zepita" No. 3
- Conflicts: 1872 coup d'état †

Marceliano Gutiérrez Chávez (June 17, 1834 — July 26, 1872) was a Peruvian colonel that participated in the coup d'état headed by his brother Tomás Gutiérrez against then president José Balta on July 22, 1872, dying in the events that took place four days later. He is accused of being the one who gave the execution order that ended Balta's life in reprisal for his brother Silvestre's murder, although this has since been disputed.

== Early life ==
Gutiérrez was born in Huancarqui to a family of Spanish descent in 1834, the son of parents Luis Gutiérrez and Julia Chávez. He enlisted, along with his three brothers in the Peruvian Army, with Tomás distinguishing himself above the others. He was described by historian Jorge Basadre as being more athletic, proud, harsh and ignorant than the rest of his brothers.

== Military career ==
He was promoted to colonel in the 1860s. In April 1870 he was convicted of the crime of flagellation against guard Luis Montejo, although he returned to active service during the government of José Balta, whom he served along with his three brothers.

=== Coup d'état ===
The Gutiérrez colonels, dissatisfied with the triumph of Manuel Pardo, the first civilian to win the presidential elections in 1872, plotted a coup against President José Balta. Previously, they tried to convince the president to annul the elections, to no avail. Then Silvestre convinced Tomás to carry out the coup plan once and for all, given that there were only a few days left before the change of command would take place. The plan was then carried out at 2 p.m. of July 22, with Silvestre taking control of Government Palace and capturing Balta. Marceliano's role was to proclaim Tomás as Supreme Chief of the Republic, while also promoting him to General.

After Silvestre was killed in a shooutout at the San Juan de Dios tram station, Tomás notified his brother, who was guarding Balta in the San Francisco barracks, through a note, after which he left for the Government Palace. Meanwhile, Major Narciso Nájar, Captain Laureano Espinoza and Lieutenant Juan Patiño, broke into Balta's room and shot him to death while he was sleeping. Balta died instantly, as a bullet passed under his beard and reached his brain. In the trial that subsequently followed the assassinations, they claimed to have followed orders from Marceliano, who thus avenged the death of his brother Silvestre.

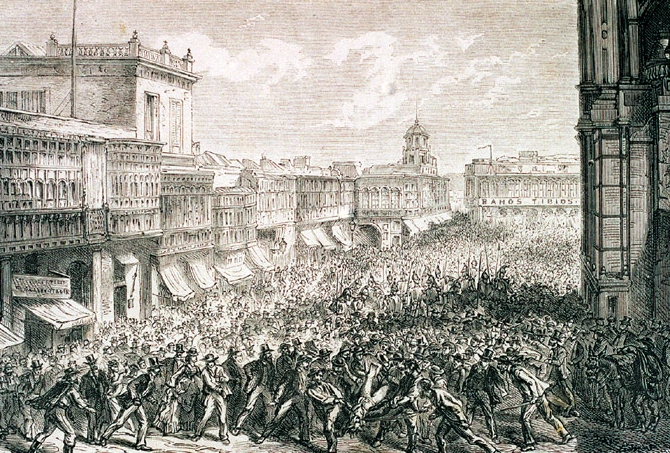
Marceliano's body being taken to the Plaza Mayor.

The aforementioned statement is the matter of controversy, as it is alleged that Marceliano interceded with Tomás to embark Balta on a ship (that was ultimately delayed) that had to leave Callao on July 24, with a bag of money with travel expenses, which would demonstrate that the brothers' intention was to preserve his life. Other claims state that the order was indeed given by him, as it was rumoured that a son of Balta was among Silvestre's murderers. In the event that the murderers had acted on their own, it is possible that Nájar's background played a role, as he was a personal enemy of Colonel Balta, since being his subordinate in an army corps he had suffered the penalty of flogging.

As the situation turned violent, Marceliano left for Callao in order to quell the revolt, while Tomás left for Santa Catalina barracks. During the events, while attempting to light a high-caliber cannon at the Real Felipe Fortress, he was fatally shot in the stomach. It is said that his last words were "another brave man dies" (Spanish: Muere otro valiente), and that the shot came from one of his own men. Initially buried in the city's Baquíjano Cemetery, his body was dug up and thrown in the bonfire at the Plaza de Armas where Tomás and Silvestre's bodies were already burning.

== See also ==
- Tomás Gutiérrez
- Silvestre Gutiérrez
- Marcelino Gutiérrez
