= Fort of Santa Catalina, Lima =

Former military fort in Peru

Coordinates: 12.0557°S 77.0269°W

Fort of Santa Catalina
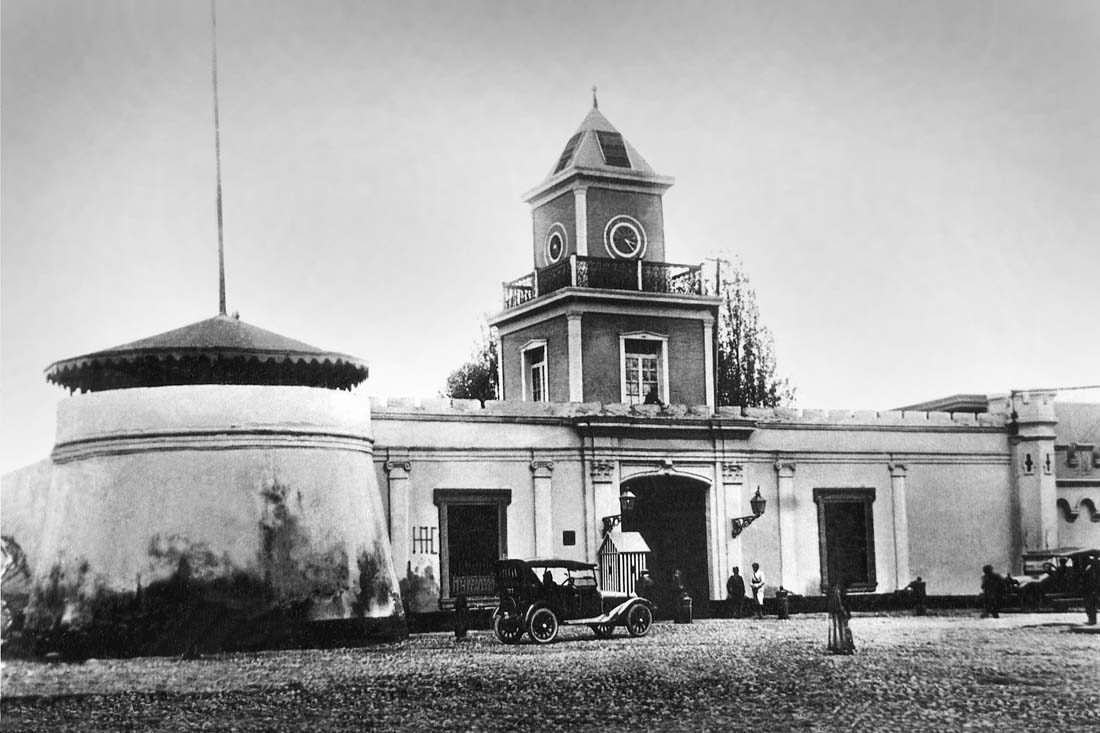
- Interactive map of the Fort of Santa Catalina area

General information
- Architectural style: Neoclassical, Viceregal
- Completed: 19th century
- Demolished: 1961, 1980–1982 (partial)
- Owner: National Institute of Culture

The Fort of Santa Catalina (Spanish: Fuerte de Santa Catalina) in Lima, Peru, is a Neoclassical style building that partly survives and it is in a good condition, and it is one of the few examples representative of the military colonial architecture that still exists in Peru. Its remaining premises host the Escuela Taller de Lima and feature the original outerwalls, as well as a chapel known as the Chapel of Saint Barbara (Spanish: Capilla de Santa Bárbara).

It dates to the 1800s and was built on a land called "Huerta de los Llanos" and "Huerta Perdida" or that of the "Cuero", which belonged to the Monasteries of Santa Catalina de Siena and de la Concepción respectively.

The property is registered as property of the Peruvian State in the Margesí of National Heritages: Asiento 12, Foja 37, Volume I of the Book of Properties of Lima having, at present, a total area of 25,250 square meters. The Liman traditionalist Ricardo Palma, in one of his tradiciones peruanas, affirms that during the Viceroy Gabriel de Avilés's government the factory of the Barracks of Santa Catalina was started for an artillery barracks, under the direction of the then colonel, and later Viceroy, Don Joaquín de la Pezuela.

== Location ==
The Cuartel de Santa Catalina is located at the jirón Inambari, corner with block 12 of the jirón Andahuaylas (Calle Costado del Cuartel), in the Plazuela de Santa Catalina in the Barrios Altos of Lima.

== Description ==
Historic Center of Lima
UNESCO World Heritage Site
- Interactive map of Historic Center of Lima
- Criteria: Cultural: iv
- Reference: 500
- Inscription: 1988 (12th Session)
- Area: 259.36 ha (640.9 acres)
- Buffer zone: 766.70 ha (1,894.6 acres)

=== Exterior ===
The façade shows a corner tower, made of adobe and arranged in a slope. The large wooden entrance to the barracks is of neoclassical style, with neoclassical pilasters of Corinthian and Ionic capitals and reduced arch in a circle segment. Also present are a square wooden tower – now without clock – gutters (old cannons embedded in front of the door), flanking towers, merlons, stylized and with arrowslits, and a merlon wall with a modillion.

On the Barracks of Santa Catalina the notable Liman scholar, architect Héctor Velarde, points out:

The barracks is an interesting example of military construction of the last years of the Colony, characterized by its wide sloping walls. These are made of adobe with turrets at the corners and, on its neoclassical façade, stands a square tower. Apart from the historical interest that it possesses and the historical-artistic value that is its own because it is one of the few Liman examples that exist of colonial military architecture, it has a great urban importance as an element that makes up the space of Plazuela de Santa Catalina.

César MIRO, from El Comercio newspaper of Lima, in relation to the facade of Fort of Santa Catalina, makes the following description:

The historic barracks had a clock in which the time was absent and a tower to see shadows of conspirators and insurgents, because it was a refuge for mutineers who entered and left through the hundred doors that the barracks had.

=== Interior ===
Regarding the interior of the Fort of Santa Catalina, César MIRO, of the El Comercio newspaper of Lima, makes the following description:

Santa Catalina was another giant of adobe like Paramonga and Chan Chan. In the plans it appears as a rectangle with reinforced angles of short height .... It has about twelve thousand square varas, a guard for troops and another for officers, forty-two pieces, stables, warehouses, arsenal, maestranza, stable, corral. It is said that it was paved by English pirate prisoners accused of depredations and looting. There was a chapel dedicated to Saint Barbara, Patroness of explosions, and images of the painter and architect Matías Maestro, a Basqueman from Álava, who graduated in law in 1792 and was conquered by the Archbishop of La Reguera. We find him as a priest and patron in the works of the Cathedral, Santo Domingo and other convents, altars, the Medical College, whose plans trace with Hipólito Unanue. He will be known more for the construction of the cemetery that bears his name.

When crossing the large wooden entrance door to the barracks, a cobblestone entryway with pebble leads us to the main courtyard, or that of arms, with setts, which has been partially restored. In the center of the courtyard still remains the old flagpole of the barracks and an old cannon of artillery at its side; to the right you can see a two-story block with a colonial balcony that is in a semi-rutted state; Inside the barracks you can see the facilities that served in other times of administrative offices which have already been restored to be used as classrooms and offices; You can also see the cell and the offices with large colonial-revival-style windows that face the façade.

The most used construction materials in the factory of the barrack, and that can be seen, are the adobe and the stone, the quincha being used in the case of the second floor of the block. It is also noted the use of wood as a building material through the large square tower and the colonial balcony of the officers block. On the other hand, some elements such as the floors are also made of tongue-and-groove wood, in addition to the stairs that connect to the upper floors. All the exterior windows of the building are protected with simple design metalwork as was customary in the neoclassical period.

== History ==
=== Viceroyalty ===
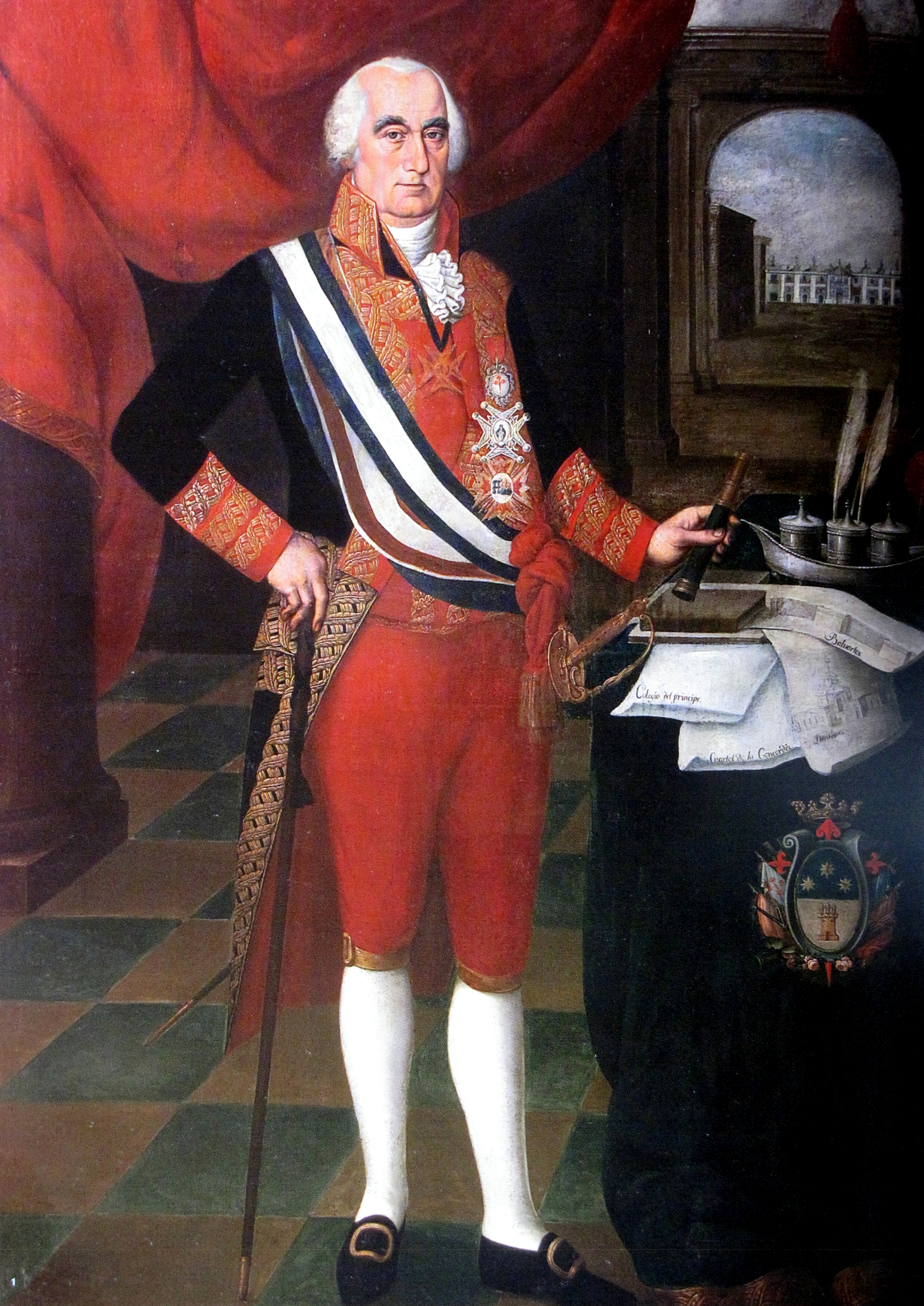
Portrait of the Viceroy of Peru José Fernando de Abascal y Souza, Marquis of la Concordia, who, during his term in office, ordered the construction of the Barracks of artillery of Santa Catalina de Lima

In 1698, Monastery of la Concepción gave in emphyteusis for 150 years the land of the so-called orchard of "Cuero" or "Perdida" to Juan del Águila Angulo who indicated the emphyteusis in favor to Francisco de Zúñiga Sotomayor. Upon the death of the beneficiary, the "empiteusis" is sold and transferred to Pedro Tramarría, who points out how his wife, Doña Nicolasa de la Presa, would benefit. The heirs of this signed a perpetual lease deed with Colonel Don Joaquín de la Pezuela, Internal Sub-Inspector and General Commander of the new Department of Spanish Artillery, representing the government. In this way, the already existing project to build a barracks, intended for the artillery corps (heavy war material, cannons, mortars, howitzers, etc.) and that would also have specialized personnel in maestranza (cavalry) and gunpowder manufacturing, became a reality on Friday August 22 of 1806, the date on which the work was begun as shown on a plaque that was on the main façade and that currently does not exist, by provision of the then Viceroy José Fernando de Abascal y Sousa, Marquis of la Concordia, who exercised command in the period 1806-1816, recording this fact in his "Memoria de Gobierno" and under the direction of the Sub-Inspector of Spanish Artillery Joaquín de la Pezuela, ten years later Viceroy of Peru.

The reason for the creation of this barracks, which initially, according to the aforementioned plaque, carried the name "Cuartel de artillería de Santa Catalina de Lima", was to reinforce the security of the capital to face the attacks of the English who sought to seize the Spanish colonies for the wealth they possessed. Another important reason was to give a new organization to the viceregal artillery corps. In this way, and with all these advances, the barracks allowed a better organization of the artillery and the increase of its strength.

Over the years, the barracks are not only occupied by the artillery of the Royalist Army but also by the infantry and cavalry of the Royalist Army but always alternately.

It is at this time that the Fort of Santa Catalina became the best Spanish bastion of South America. From there, arms and troops were sent to the other governorships and the Viceroyalty of the Río de la Plata to debase any revolutionary uprising against the Spanish crown.

=== Emancipation ===
During the period of Emancipation, this barracks was used by both royalists and patriots who took advantage of their workshops and venues to shelter.

=== Republic ===
Upon the establishment of the Republic, the supply of war material was made, as in the Viceroyalty, through the General Commandcy of Artillery, which centralized the stores of the Park, the Maestranza and the Powder Factory. The first two units continued to operate in the Barracks of Santa Catalina until the end-19th century.

In the Fort of Santa Catalina was deposited, being there for several years, the coat or "leva" that the Marshal of Peru Agustín Gamarra was wearing at the Battle of Ingavi on November 18 of 1841.

In 1845 the construction of the Escuela de Aplicación de Artillería (Artillery Application School) began, which was located within the barracks facilities but with defined areas. This would become the antecedent of the Military College that years later would replace it.

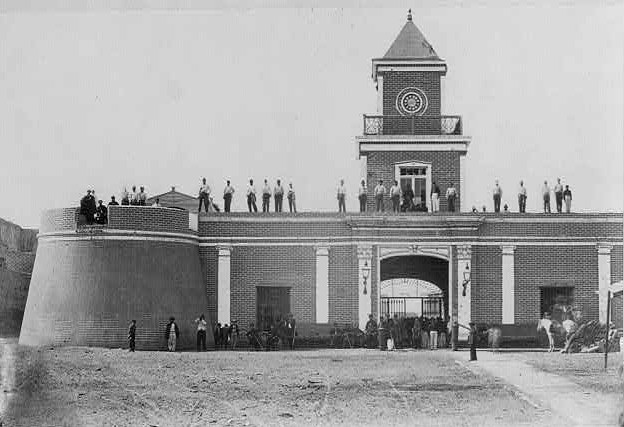
Fort of Santa Catalina. Photo of 1873.

During the coup d'état against the President José Balta y Montero occurred at 2 o'clock atafternoon of July 22 of 1872, the Army Colonel Tomás Gutiérrez, took the decision to move, on July 26 of 1872, to the Barracks of Santa Catalina with the Government Palace's troops and of the Infantry Battalion “Zepita” Nº 3 of his brother the Army Colonel Marceliano Gutiérrez. In front to the Barracks of Santa Catalina several barricades were erected. The water and gas pipelines connected to the Barracks of Santa Catalina were cut. At about 9 o'clock at night, while firing rifles and cannons, Tomás Gutiérrez and his brother the Army Colonel Marcelino Gutiérrez left with their troops. The besiegers of Barracks of Santa Catalina retreated and momentarily disconcerted.

During the War of the Pacific, the Artillery Barracks of Santa Catalina had John White Canyons which were a copy of the Vavasseur model 71 of 55 mm, with some variants. In January 1881, the Chilean army that entered Lima, on the 17th of that month, entered the Barracks of Santa Catalina looting all the war material that it possessed and carrying weapons of inestimable historical value.

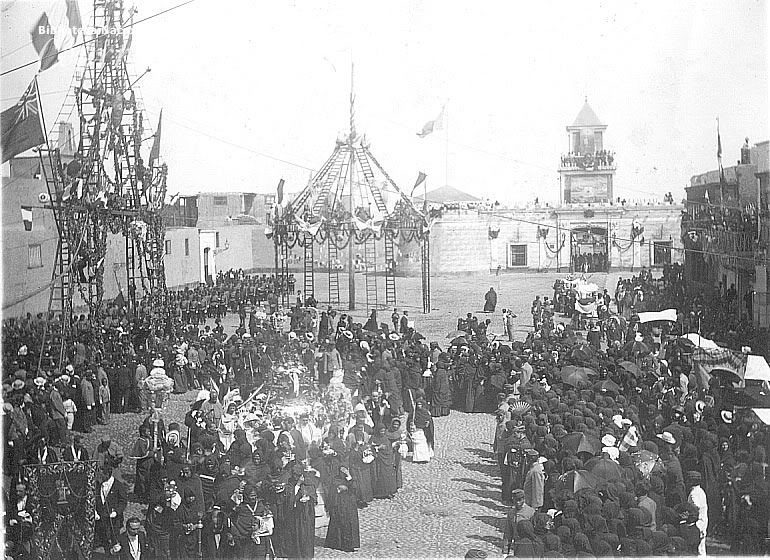
Parade of Conscripts of the Peruvian Army in front of Fort of Santa Catalina. Photograph taken in the second half of the 1890s.

In the 1890s the Fort of Santa Catalina was seat of the Brigade of Artillery of Campaign of Mountain of the Peruvian Army.

In those years, every July 28, the date of the national anniversary of Peru, a salve of artillery was practiced in the Fort of Santa Catalina when the sun just appeared on the horizon, announcing the advent of the day when the Protector Supreme Generalissimo Don José de San Martín, proclaimed the independence of Peru, that same day the Honor Guard of the Government Palace, main door, and Fuerte Santa Catalina covered it the School of Classes.

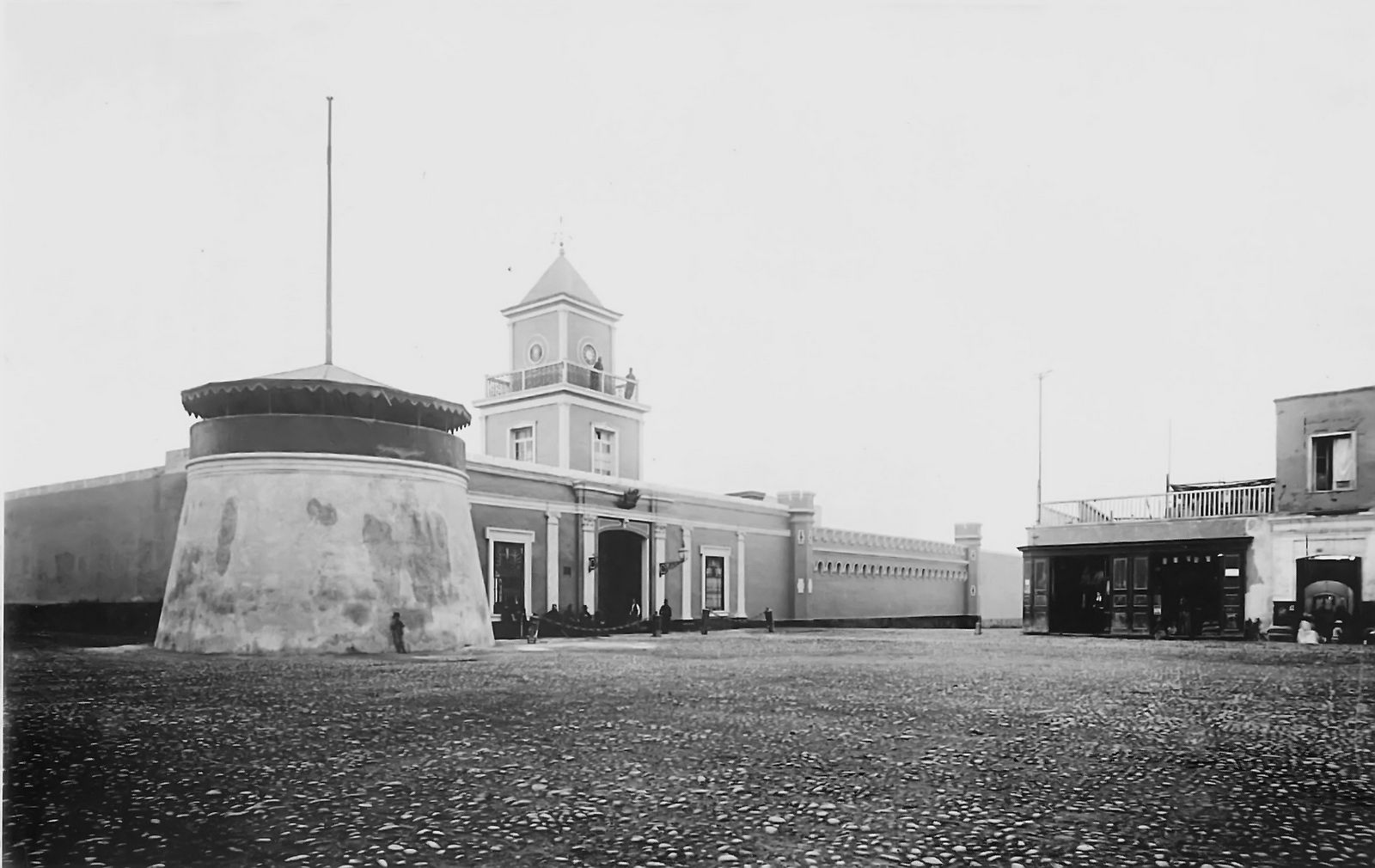
Fort of Santa Catalina, former Artillery Barracks. You can see the corner tower, the Neoclassical style doorway, two of its flanking towers, stylized and with loopholes, and part of the marloned wall and showing modillions. Photo of 1902.

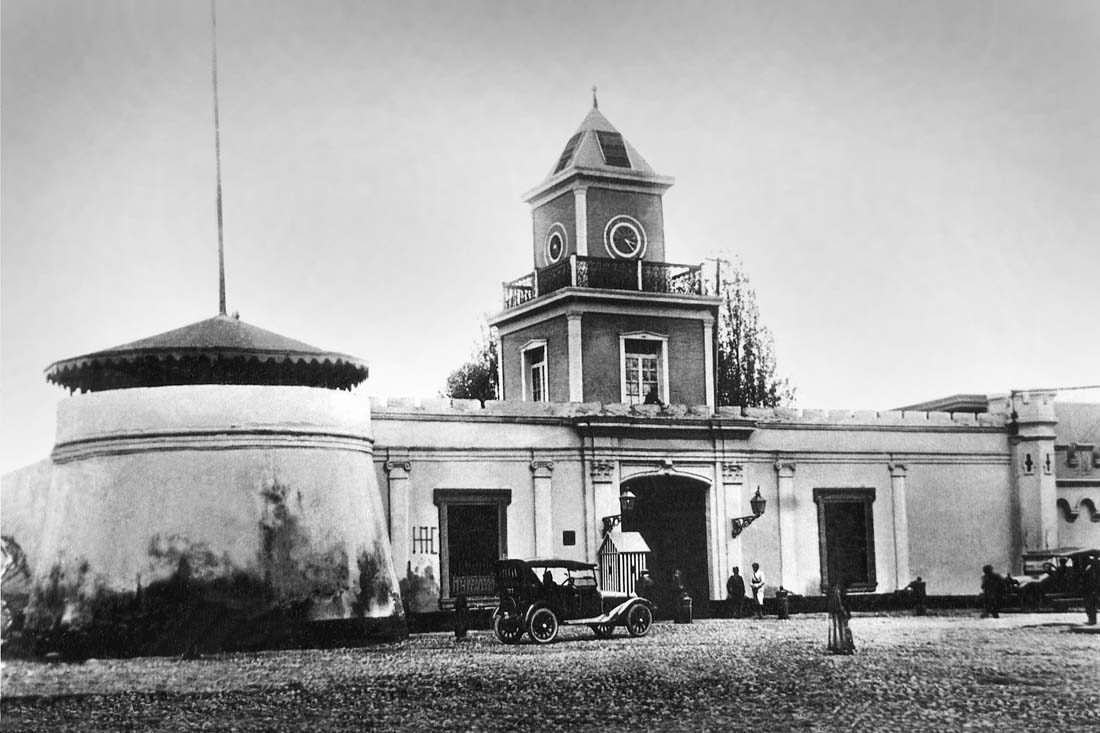
Frontis of Fort of Santa Catalina, former Artillery Barracks and Military Police. Photo of the second half of the 1890s.

At the early-20th-century the Park and the Maestranza, that were in the facilities of the Barracks of Santa Catalina, move to the Barracks Barbones.

Other historical events of which this barracks was witness have been mainly popular riots, political assassinations, coup d'état and rebellions of the army troop occurred throughout the history of the republic.

The February 4 of 1914 occurred the coup d'état against the President Guillermo Billinghurst. The Infantry Battalion “Caquetá” Nº 9, which at that time was stationed in the Barracks of Santa Catalina, was one of the Combat Units of the Garrison of Lima under the command of Colonel EP Óscar Raimundo Benavides Larrea, resigning chief of the General Staff of the Peruvian Army, who joined the military uprising. During this coup d'état, the Minister of War and Navy General of the Brigade EP Enrique Varela Vidaurre was assassinated, at the Barracks of Santa Catalina, who on the night of February 3 of 1914 went to spend the night there.

In that same year (1914) the President of the Republic Colonel EP Óscar R. Benavides ordered the decomposition of the Mountain Artillery Regiment No. 3, which at the time also had its headquarters in the Barracks Santa Catalina of Lima, highlighting an Artillery Group (one of the two fractions), to the city of Arequipa which was established in a plots of Tingo donated by Mr. Gonzalo Vivanco in a recently created camp, with ashlar and adobe material.

Little remembered is the case of mutiny of the Infantry Regiment No. 5, stationed at that time, in the Barracks of Santa Catalina, on March 23 of 1931 and that was commanded by Sergeant 2º EP Víctor Faustino Huapaya Chacón, a carpenter and son of a seller of vegetables from Chorrillos. At that time, the Barracks of Santa Catalina was the equivalent of the current 18th Armored Brigade of the Peruvian Army.

The mutineers seized their bosses in the dining room and then took to the streets with tanks and firing machine guns and rifles, after leaving a garrison for the defense of the Barracks. They toured the city without a specific plan. They tried to take the Ministry of Government and Police, being repelled by the Republican Guard, and the Government Palace, failing completely. They took the towers of some churches and rang the bells causing alarm in the population. Faced with the repressive attitude of the rest of the Army, the insurgents were forced to return to the Barracks of Santa Catalina, where they were besieged by government troops made up of contingents from the Artillery Regiment No. 2 of the Chorrillos Military School and of Republican Guard Regiment. To parley, the Minister of Government and Police Francisco Tamayo, War Minister Commander EP Gustavo Jiménez and a group of officers entered the Barracks of Santa Catalina and were received by Sergeant Huapaya, who wore an official officer's belt and an officer's sword on his belt. and the incumbent classes who presented the parliamentarians with a list of demands that, among other things, demanded: the execution of the former president Augusto B. Leguía, overthrown in 1930 by the Commander EP Luis Miguel Sánchez Cerro and that he was prisoner and sick; the separation of all the high chiefs of the Army and the construction of hygienic barracks.

Commander Jiménez rejected the list of claims presented by the rebels and removed the sword to Huapaya. The fight resumed and as she continued two planes threw grenades in the courtyard of the Barracks of Santa Catalina. At that, the rebels surrendered. Between dead and injured there were more than 40 casualties.

A War Council sentenced Sergeant Huapaya to twenty years in prison; but the Governing Board of David Samanez Ocampo granted him a short time later and Huapaya joined the Sanchecerrists.

By Supreme Resolution No. 2 - CM of January 19 of 1946 the Barracks is declared a National Historic-Artistic Monument, in charge of its administration National Institute of Culture (INC). Years later this resolution was confirmed by Supreme Resolution No. 2900 given December 28 of 1972.

The Barracks of Santa Catalina was declared intangible by the Metropolitan Deliberative Board of Historic, Artistic and Archaeological Sites of Lima through Report N° 6, corresponding to the years 1962 and 1963. Here, certain architectural elements such as the original perimeter walls are called intangibles, which can still be seen surrounding the areas of State College No. 1035 "General de División EP José del Carmen Marín Arista", and a tower, which can be seen in the front of the barracks and on the corner of Jirón Andahuaylas with Inambari.

However, in 1963, the building is demolished in its intermediate part to facilitate the construction of the extension of the Nicolás de Piérola Avenue. Subsequently, the southern sector was granted, as property, to the Ministry of War as well as the northwest sector owned by the Ministry of Education.

Until the end-1970s the barracks served as headquarters of the Military police of the Peruvian Army (as historical testimony can still be seen, in one of the walls of the barracks, the Code of Honor of the Military police, a Coat of arms of Peru and an Emblem, of this Military Corps, composed of two pistols arranged in the form of the Cross of Burgundy).

In 1976, in the Fortof Santa Catalina, when the military building was Barracks of the Battalion of Military police, was imprisoned, for having been sentenced by the Military Justice, the Artillery Captain (R) EP Vladimiro Montesinos former intelligence advisor of the former president Alberto Fujimori. Montesinos was accused of the crime of treason.

One of its parts (the southern sector) was demolished during the second government of the Architect Fernando Belaúnde Terry (1980 - 1985) so that the Ordinary Penitentiary Establishment of Closed Regime for Primary Prisoners "San Jorge" was built during the efforts of the Ministers of Justice Dr. Felipe Osterling (1980-1981) and Dr. Enrique Elías Laroza (1981-1982). Part of the building, shortly thereafter, was also cut to build General de División EP José del Carmen Marín Arista", which was created by Supreme Resolution N ° 134-83-ED of March 23 of 1983, Although the Chapel of Bárbara was not touched, Employer of explosions, this was affected as far as its environment is concerned because it is no longer in front of a courtyard of weapons but a few meters from the perimeter wall that surrounds what is left of the old colonial building.

== Current situation ==
The building is currently owned by the National Institute of Culture and constitutes approximately only one fifth of the original building, including the frontis, survives, they are in a good condition, also is the chapel of Santa Bárbara.

Following works of archeology, the building was restored by the School of Restoration denominated Escuela Taller de Lima, which is subsidized by the Spanish Association of International Cooperation (AECI). This school is in charge of the integral restoration of the aforementioned monument.

== See also ==
- Church of Saint Catherine of Siena
- San Jorge Prison, located across the street

== Bibliography ==
- “ITINERARIOS DE LIMA” by Héctor Velarde, Patronage of Lima, Second Edition, 1990, p. 92.
- “LIMA, PASEOS POR LA CIUDAD Y SU HISTORIA", Guías Expreso, edited by the Diario Expreso de Lima newspaper and the Banco Sudamericano bank, p. 111.
- “SUPLEMENTO DOMINICAL Nº 32, del 8 de agosto de 1993, del DIARIO EL COMERCIO DE LIMA", Chronicle, el fuerte de Santa Catalina by César MIRO, p. 19.
