= Carlos Chávez (disambiguation) =

Carlos Chávez (1899–1978) was a Mexican composer, conductor and educator.

Carlos Chávez may also refer to:

- Carlos Chávez (football administrator) (1958–2018), head of the Bolivian Football Federation
- Carlos Chávez (footballer) (born 1984), Colombian footballer
- Carlos Chávez (tennis) (born 1963), Guatemalan tennis player
- Carlos Chávez (weightlifter) (1928–2006), Panamanian Olympic weightlifter
- Carlos Manuel Chávez (born 1931), Peruvian cardiovascular and thoracic surgeon
- Carlos Bonilla Chávez (1923–2010), Ecuadorian classical guitar player
