= 1868 election =

1868 election may refer to:

- 1868 United States presidential election
- United States House of Representatives elections, 1868
- 1868 United Kingdom general election
- Peruvian Presidential election, see José Balta
