= Fernando Casós Flores =

Peruvian politician (1828–1881)

Fernando Casós Flores (Trujillo; 1828 – Lima; 1881) was a Peruvian politician and writer. He played an important role in the coup d'état against José Balta in 1872, serving as Secretary General of the country during the short presidency of Tomás Gutiérrez. After the violent events of July 26 and 27, Casós resigned and sought refuge in France's diplomatic mission, later emigrating to Chile where he defended his actions through his book, Defensa de Fernando Casós.

== See also ==
- 1872 Peruvian coup d'état
