= Huancarqui District =

District of Peru

Huancarqui Wankarki
- District
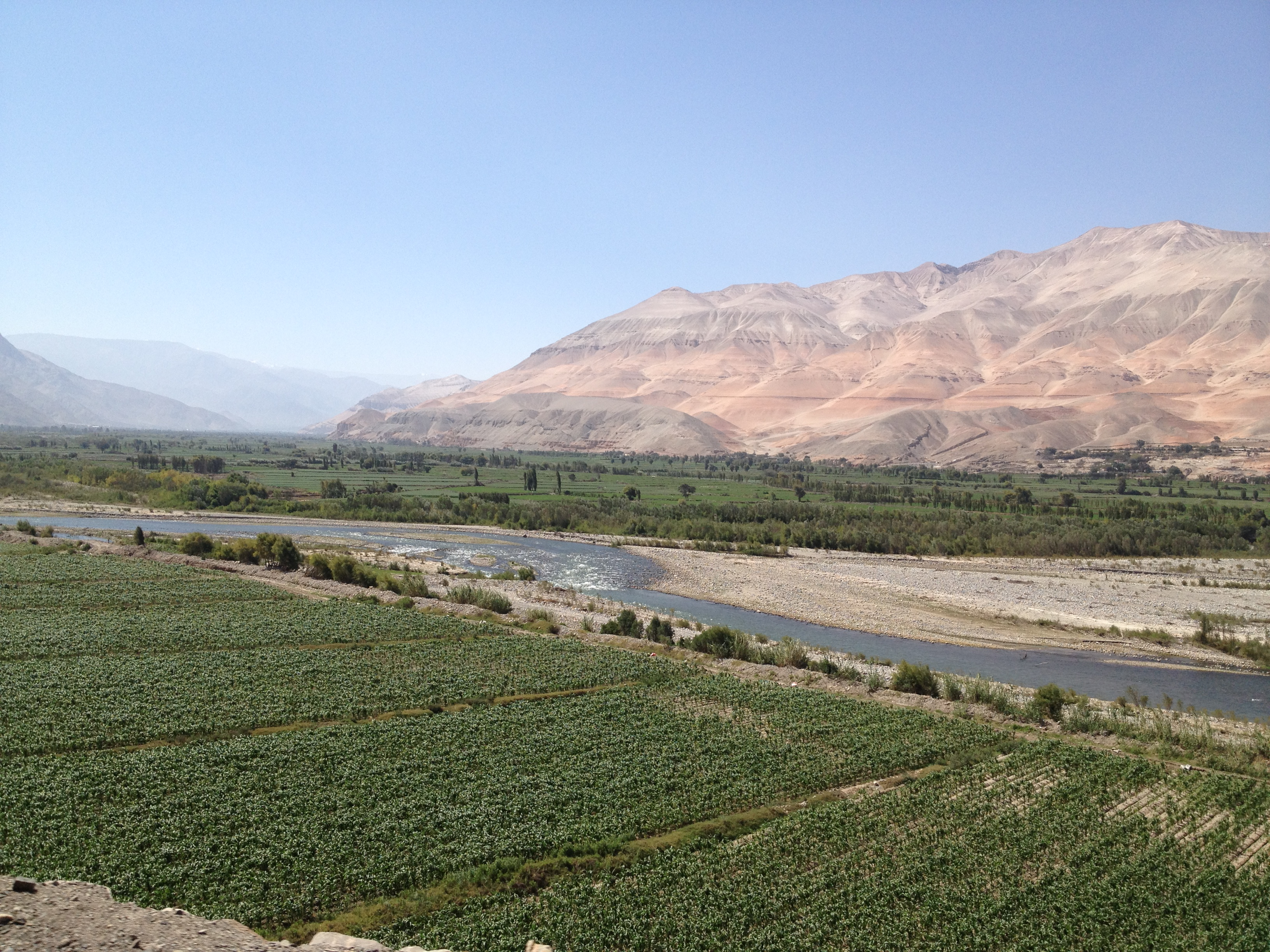
- View of Majes River passing through the district

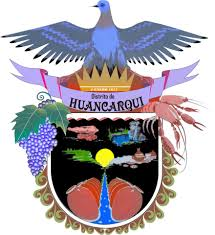
- Coat of arms

- Location within Peru
- Coordinates: 16°09′S 72°47′W
- Country: Peru
- Department: Arequipa
- Province: Castilla
- Capital: Huancarqui
- Subdivisions: 25 populated centres

Government
  - Mayor: Bernabé Rafael Salinas

Area
  - Total: 803.65 km^{2} (310.29 sq mi)
- Elevation: 610 m (2,000 ft)

Population (2005)
  - Total: 1,682
  - Density: 2.093/km^{2} (5.421/sq mi)
- Demonym(s): Huancarquino, -na
- Time zone: UTC-5 (PET)
- UBIGEO: 040407
- Website: munihuancarqui.gob.pe

Huancarqui (Spanish: [waŋˈkaɾki]; Quechua: Wankarki) is a district of Castilla, a province of the department of Arequipa, Peru. Its capital is the populated centre of the same name.

== Etymology ==
The district's name, also written "Guancarqui" up until 1800, come from the Quechua words Huancar, meaning "drum", and Canque, meaning "you".

== History ==
Huancarqui is one of the oldest settlements in the province of Castilla, having been populated since pre-Inca times. It is presumed that the first Spaniards who arrived founded the town on Inca cemeteries. According to Spanish chronicler Garcilaso de la Vega, the Incas that conquered the region under Cápac Yupanqui in 1000 AD made it into their local headquarters in order to be able to conquer local rival groups. The arrival of these Incas allowed for a unique development of a mixed culture descended from the Wari, Tiwanaku and Inca cultures, as well as the Spanish culture that would arrive later.

At the time the arrival of the Spanish in 1549, the area was inhabited by the Collaguas and Cabanas, two Kunti ethnic groups, as recorded by Martín López de Carvajal, a Conquistador originating from Extremadura, as well as one of the founders of Arequipa, who arrived to the area under direct orders of the Viceroy of Peru. On April 19, 1813, Huancarqui's town hall was established. It was led by an Alcalde ordinario, who oversaw five other people. The mayor was accompanied by a procurador and two regidores.

On May 3, 1955, a government law elevated Huancarqui to a capital town of the homonymous new district. Today the town has a population of approximately 1700 people. Despite it being less developed than neighboring Aplao and Corire, it is nonetheless a well-off touristic spot among visitors.

Throughout its history, Huancarqui has had the following priests: Agustín Laso de la Vega y Soto, Pedro Velasco, Jacinto Llerena y Dávila, Manuel Dávila y Calderón, Leandro Dávila y Dávila. Pedro Chacón de Luna y Dávila, Antonio Nates y Martínez del Pino, Mariano Adrián López y Nates, Manuel Mariano Rodríguez de Olmedo y Martínez del Pino, and Alejo Rodríguez de Olmedo y Martínez del Pino, among others.

== Geography ==
Huancarqui is located in the Majes Valley, where the Colca River flows through. It is located below 1 000 meters above sea level and is made up of the districts of Aplao, Uraca and Huancarqui. The terrain is mostly plain and fertile, in comparison to the surrounding deserts.

The climate in the region of Castilla Baja is very hot due to its narrowness and depth, in relation to the plain where the waters have undermined its basin. Average annual temperatures range between 15º and 24 °C. The winter rains on the coast and summer in the mountains. reach only the ends of the valley, which does not receive rain other than very scarce drizzles.

== Government ==
Huancarqui is under the jurisdiction of its own district municipality. The Catholic Church in Peru administers the district as part of the Territorial Prelature of Chuquibamba.

=== List of mayors ===
Mayor	Party	Term	
Mayor	Party	Begin	End
Lieutenant-Generals of Huancarqui
Rafael Martínez del Pino y López	—N/a	1736	
Francisco de Campos y Tapia	—N/a	1737	
Agustín Araico y Corral	—N/a	1759	
Mayors of Huancarqui
Agustín Araico y Corral	—N/a	1788	
Agustín Hipólito Araico y Martínez del Pino	—N/a	1802	
Mariano Santos de Quiroz y Nieto	—N/a	1813	
Pedro López y Velazco	—N/a	1816	
Manuel Valcárcel y López	—N/a	1817	
Ramón Ramírez de Avellano y Estrada	—N/a	1818	
Mariano Santos de Quiroz y Nieto	—N/a	1819	
Mariano Santos de Quiroz y Nieto	—N/a	1822	
Ramón Ramírez de Avellano y Estrada	—N/a	1826	
José Serna y Muñoz	—N/a	1829	
Miguel Dávila	—N/a	1853	
F. Javier Araico	—N/a	1885	
Juan Manuel Rendón	—N/a	1904	
Enrique F. Araico	—N/a	1910	
Eduardo Sánchez	—N/a	1915	
Rubén Rendón Rojas	—N/a	1920	
Rubén. R. Araico Torres	—N/a	1922	
Raymundo I. Velazco Aranzamendi	—N/a	1924	
Ezequiel Gutiérrez Suárez	—N/a	1933	
Raymundo I. Velazco Aranzamendi	—N/a	1935	
Enrique O. Lazarte	—N/a	1937	
Clemente Chirinos Fernández	—N/a	1938	
Francisco Pacheco	—N/a	1940	
T. Benjamín Núñez Martínez	—N/a	1941	
Rubén Rendón Rojas	—N/a	1944	
Enrique O. Lazarte	—N/a	1946	
Manuel Ríos	—N/a	1947	
Artemio Zúñiga Sánchez	—N/a	1948	
Víctor Augusto Gutiérrez Dávila	—N/a	1957	
Artemio Zúñiga Sánchez	—N/a	1960	
Adalberto Zúñiga Araico	—N/a	1963	
César Velazco Postigo	—N/a	1964	
Benjamín Rendón Zavala	—N/a	1967	
Clemente Chirinos Araico	—N/a	1970	
Genaro Gutiérrez Barreto	—N/a	1972	
Eduardo Velazco Morán	—N/a	1977	
Vicente A. Vera Valencia	—N/a	1979	
Baltasar Febres Postigo	—N/a	1979	
Alfonso López Arias	—N/a	1980	
Juan Martínez Zúñiga	—N/a	1981	
Jorge Zúñiga Zúñiga	—N/a	1984	
Enrique Zúñiga Araico	—N/a	1987	
Tomás N. Linares Villanueva	—N/a	1990	
Darwin Zúñiga Ames	Vamos Vecino	1999	2002
Jony Mampari Cárdenas Urquizo	Todos Por Castilla	2003	2006
Jony Mampari Cárdenas Urquizo	Todos Por Castilla	2007	2010
Flavio Antonio Martínez Martínez	Arequipa Renace	2011	2014
Jony Mampari Cárdenas Urquizo	Juntos por el desarrollo de Arequipa	2015	2018
Flavio Antonio Martínez Martínez	Arequipa Renace	2019	2022
Bernabé Rafael Salinas Zuniga	Arequipa, Tradición y Futuro	2023	2026

=== Subdivisions ===
Huancarqui is the site of 25 populated centres that make up the district:

Code	Name	Region Type	Altitude (MSL)	Population (total)	Housing (total)
0001	Huancarqui	Maritime Yunga	620	1,256 (2017)	627 (2017)
0002	Huatiapa	Maritime Yunga	754	16 (2017)	16 (2017)
0003	Ccollpa	Maritime Yunga	655	6 (2017)	5 (2017)
0004	Cuculintay	Maritime Yunga	595	6 (2017)	5 (2017)
0006	Las Islas Santa Rosa	Maritime Yunga	607	17 (2017)	14 (2017)
0007	El Recodo	Maritime Yunga	618	11 (2017)	6 (2017)
0008	Chacones	Maritime Yunga	590	6 (2017)	3 (2017)
0009	El Conto	Maritime Yunga	588	0 (2017)	2 (2017)
0010	Callejones	Maritime Yunga	595	0 (2017)	2 (2017)
0011	Sacramento	Maritime Yunga	577	1 (2017)	1 (2017)
0012	Las Tiendas	Maritime Yunga	591	4 (2017)	3 (2017)
0013	Los Pinos	Maritime Yunga	591	2 (2017)	1 (2017)
0014	Las Tierras	Maritime Yunga	591	1 (2017)	1 (2017)
0016	Lopez	Maritime Yunga	579	0 (2017)	2 (2017)
0017	El Majuelo	Maritime Yunga	588	5 (2017)	1 (2017)
0018	La Laja	Maritime Yunga	594	36 (2017)	16 (2017)
0019	Pampa Blanca	Maritime Yunga	536	3 (2017)	7 (2017)
0020	Tomaca	Maritime Yunga	520	12 (2017)	7 (2017)
0021	Collon	Maritime Yunga	503	5 (2017)	3 (2017)
0022	San Antonio	Maritime Yunga	598	5 (2017)	3 (2017)
0023	San Isidro	Maritime Yunga	690	0 (2017)	1 (2017)
0024	Santo Domingo	Maritime Yunga	523	11 (2017)	5 (2017)
0025	Sicera	Maritime Yunga	2,008	0 (2017)	2 (2017)
0026	El Rescate	Maritime Yunga	521	2 (2017)	2 (2017)
0027	Ganchos Sicera	Quechua	2,902	73 (2017)	35 (2017)

== Culture ==
Huancarqui is an agricultural district, known locally for its archeologic heritage, such as the many petroglyphs found, as well as a nearby dinosaur-themed park. The valley as a whole is known for its pisco production, with its many wineries being part of a gastronomic route. Fishing is also a popular activity in the district. Touristic attractions include outdoor sports, such as rafting or hiking, or the local gastronomy, with many of its restaurants specializing in traditional Peruvian food.

=== Religion ===
A Roman Catholic church building dedicated to Saint Nicholas of Tolentino, after whom it is named, is located in the district's capital.

Religion is important among the local population, with Catholicism being held in high esteem by the local population. Local festivities, such as the Virgen de Chapi or Our Lady of Mount Carmel are important in the area. During Holy Week, local residents tend to perform traditional activities such as the Via Crucis in the surrounding mountains, as well as traditional Mass services. Folk legends are also popular with locals, who claim certain areas are haunted.

== Transport ==
Owing to its location in a valley, transport is limited to the roads linking the towns together along the valley. The town is accessed through Aplao District. Both public and private transport usually service these roads.

== Notable people ==
- Tomás Gutiérrez (1817–1872), a colonel who carried out a coup-d'état in Lima in 1872, alongside his three brothers (Silvestre, Marcelino and Marceliano), after which only one survived.
- Mariano Rodríguez de Olmedo y Valle (1771–1831), Roman Catholic bishop of San Juan de Puerto Rico and first archbishop of Santiago de Cuba

== See also ==
- Gutiérrez Brothers' rebellion
