= Tomás Gutiérrez =

Peruvian Colonel

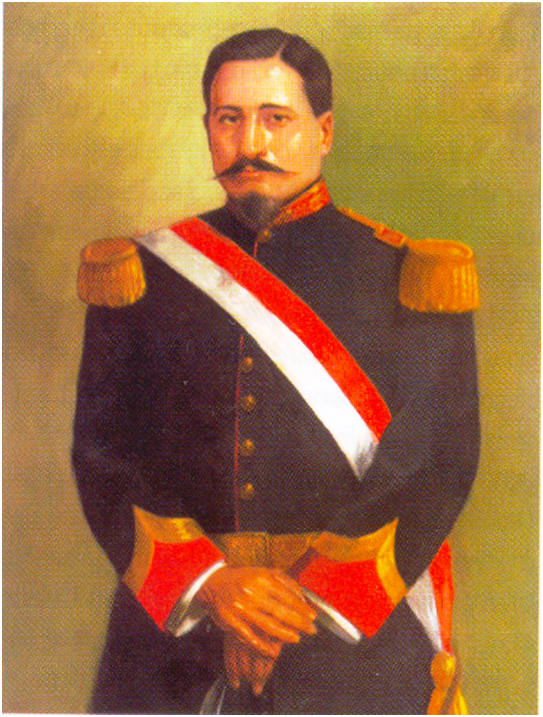

Supreme Leader of the Republic of Peru
- In office July 22, 1872 – July 26, 1872
- Preceded by: José Balta
- Succeeded by: Mariano Herencia Zevallos

Deputy of Castilla Province
- In office 1858–1859

Minister of War
- In office December 7, 1871 – July 22, 1872
- Preceded by: José Allende
- Succeeded by: Mariano Herencia Zevallos (Note: The position was vacant until July 27, 1872.)

Personal details
- Born: March 7, 1817 Huancarqui, Peru
- Died: July 26, 1872 (aged 55) Lima, Peru
- Party: Military
- Relatives: Silvestre (brother); Marceliano (brother); Marcelino (brother)

Military service
- Allegiance: Peru
- Branch/service: Peruvian Army
- Years of service: Before 1854–1872
- Rank: Colonel
- Battles/wars: Liberal Revolution of 1854; Battle of La Palma; Peruvian Civil War (1856-58); Siege of Arequipa; Ecuadorian–Peruvian War; Peruvian Civil War (1865); Chincha Islands War; Battle of Callao; Peruvian Civil War (1867); 1872 Peruvian coup d'état †

Tomás Francisco Gutiérrez Chávez (March 7, 1817 – July 26, 1872) was a Peruvian colonel who, along with his brothers, led a coup against President José Balta Montero and served as the Supreme Leader of Peru for four days in July 1872. From July 22, 1872, to July 26, 1872, Gutiérrez was the de facto leader of Peru and the self-proclaimed "Supreme Leader of the Republic" after a coup d'état. He was overthrown just four days after his proclamation and lynched. Peru later regained some political stability with the election of Manuel Pardo, although this stability was short-lived as a foreign threat began to arise in Chile.

== Early life ==
Gutiérrez was born in Huancarqui to a family of Spanish descent in March 1817, the third child and first son of parents Luis Gutiérrez and Julia Chávez in what was then the Viceroyalty of Peru. He worked as a muleteer, known also as an arriero, and later enlisted himself in the army. His three younger brothers—Silvestre, Marcelino and Marceliano—followed his example, although without distinguishing themselves, as Tomás did.

== Military career ==
Gutiérrez was first ascended to Infantry Sergeant Major in 1854 and then travelled to Arequipa to take part in the revolution headed by Ramón Castilla. He participated in the march on Lima and for his outstanding performance in the battle of La Palma, fought on January 5, 1855, he was promoted to lieutenant colonel.

During the second government of Castilla he fought against the revolution led by Manuel Ignacio de Vivanco in Arequipa, which led to the bloody Peruvian Civil War of 1856–1858. Due to his merits in the final assault on Arequipa, he was promoted to colonel on March 7, 1858. Elected deputy for the province of Castilla, he attended the legislatures of 1858-1859. He also participated in the campaign against Ecuador.

As head of the Áncash battalion, he supported the governments of Presidents Miguel de San Román (1862-1863) and Juan Antonio Pezet (1863-1865). He stood out fighting in defense of the Pezet government against Colonel Mariano Ignacio Prado's revolution of 1865, for which he was promoted to general. While the advance of the revolutionaries towards Lima was taking place, he pacified the population of Callao who had spoken out in favor of Vice President Pedro Diez Canseco, but after the fall of Pezet he was arrested and his promotion to general was annulled on December 13, 1865.

Deposed from the rank hierarchy, he enlisted as a simple soldier in the Depósito Battalion and participated together with his brothers in the Battle of Callao on May 2, 1866. After the conflict with Spain, he moved to Tarapacá and joined the revolution that in defense of the Constitution of 1860 was headed by Marshal Castilla, who ratified him as a general and appointed him commander general of his hunting units, in April 1867. He accompanied the Marshal in the last moments of his life. With the revolution having come to an end because of Castilla's death, he returned to Lima.

Shortly after, he joined the uprising that broke out in Arequipa against the Prado government and the Constitution of 1867, led by Vice President Pedro Diez Canseco, who recognized Tomás as a general. He contributed to the defense of Arequipa against the attack of the government troops, and then followed the triumphant troops of Diez Canseco, arriving in Callao on January 22, 1868. Sent to Chiclayo to fight the revolution of Colonel José Balta, he did not want to use arms against the people, and returned to Lima to report on the situation.

After the election of Balta as president and the installation of Congress, on August 12, 1868, the promotions granted by President Pezet were declared invalid, and once again he was lowered to the rank of colonel. President Balta appointed him Inspector General of the Army and proposed to Congress his promotion to general, but the respective law was never issued. Despite this, Tomás gave decided support to Balta's government, and so did his brothers, also Colonels, who were at the head of the battalions that garrisoned Lima. It was mainly due to this support that Balta's government enjoyed stability, even before the coup that the brothers themselves would star in a few days before the end of it.

Under Balta, Gutiérrez was able to provide funds for the reconstruction of the San Nicolás de Tolentino Church in Huancarqui after it was destroyed in the 1868 Arica earthquake.

Gutiérrez was appointed Minister of War and Navy in 1871, a fact that was received with alarm by the recently founded Civilista Party, the same one that at that time triumphed in the general elections, leading to the presidency of Manuel Pardo y Lavalle.

== Coup d'état and death ==
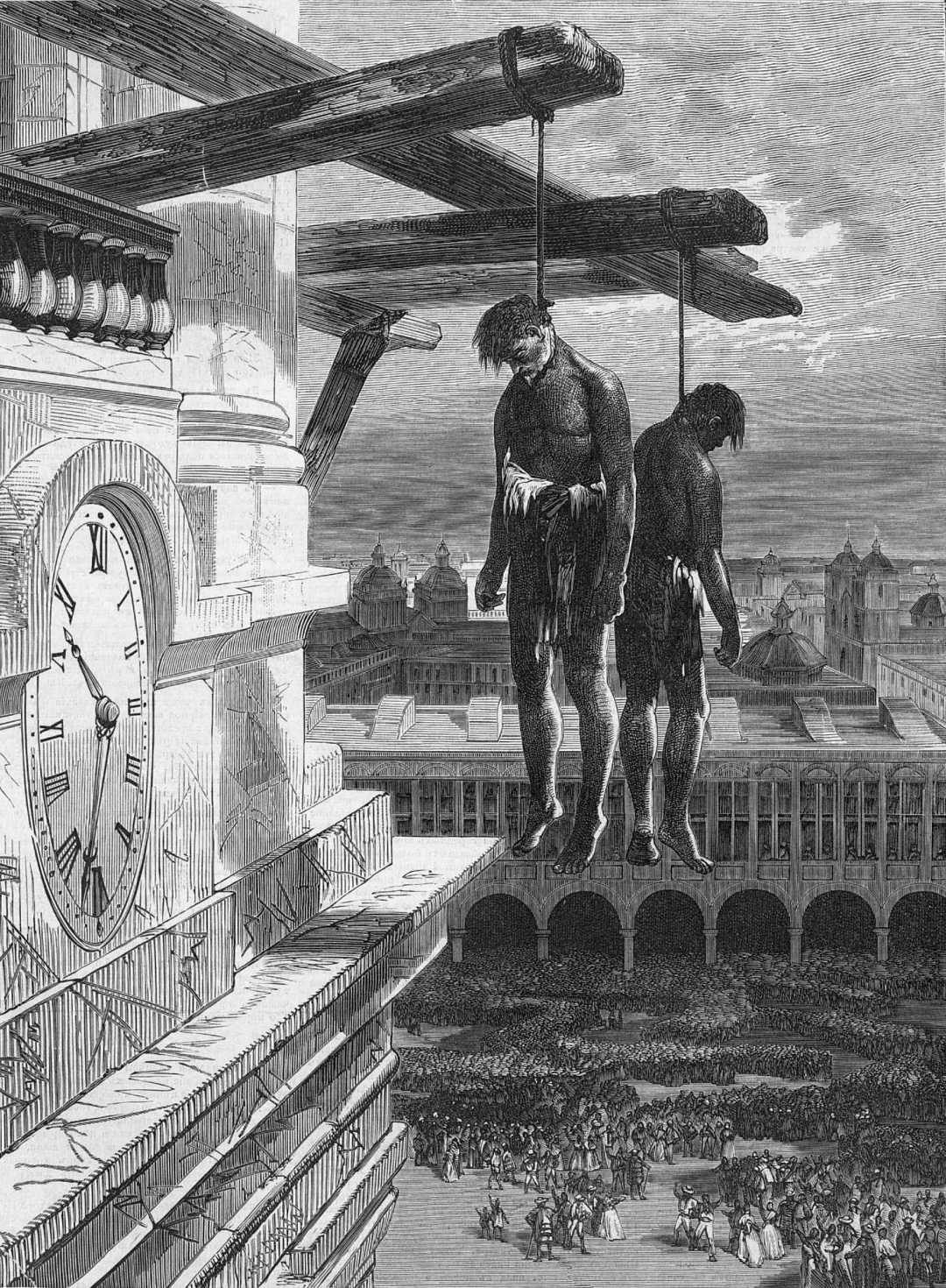
Tomás Gutiérrez and his brother Silvestre. Lima, 1872

The 1872 elections in Peru had produced a victory for Manuel Pardo, who was to become the first civilian president in the history of Peru. Shortly before Pardo was to take office, however, Gutiérrez, serving as President Balta's War Minister, organized a coup d'état with his three brothers, proclaiming himself Supreme Leader of the Republic and asking for the support of the armed forces, with only some members of the Army agreeing.

Opposed by the Navy through a statement on July 23 and the general public, violence arose against the brothers, with Silvestre being assassinated on July 26, when he was going to take the tram at the San Juan de Dios Station. Marceliano, who was guarding Balta in the San Francisco barracks, allegedly ordered his execution in retaliation, with the former president being shot by three riflemen while he was resting in his bed after having lunch, and the news of his death quickly spreading throughout Lima.

The atmosphere quickly turned against the brothers, with three of them being killed during the conflict, and only one—Marcelino—surviving the events. Captured days later, he served prison for some time and was released by an amnesty law; he then he participated in the defense of Lima, during the War of the Pacific, fighting in the Battle of San Juan and Chorrillos and in the Battle of Miraflores, in 1881. He died of tuberculosis in 1904.

The four-day regime of Tomás Gutiérrez did not halt the increasing control of civilians in the Peruvian government. Just one week after Gutiérrez's overthrow, Pardo assumed the presidency and his party, the Civilista Party, would be a dominant force in Peruvian politics for decades to come.

== See also ==
- History of Peru
- List of assassinated and executed heads of state and government

== Notes ==
Political offices
Preceded by José Balta	Supreme Leader of the Republic of Peru; 1872	Succeeded by Mariano Herencia Zevallos
