= Marcelino Gutiérrez =

Peruvian colonel (1829–1904)

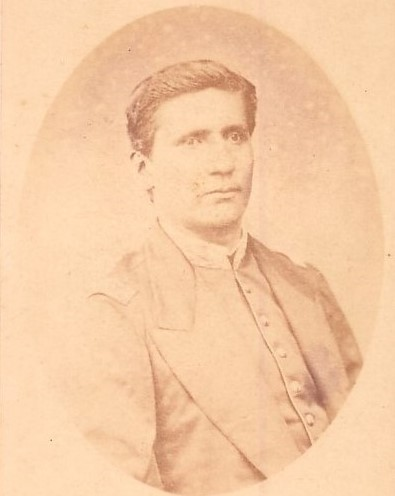
- Born: 31 May 1829; Huancarqui, Peru
- Died: 9 December 1904 (aged 75); Arequipa, Peru
- Military career
- Allegiance: Peruvian Army
- Service years: 1849–c. 1884
- Rank: Colonel
- Nickname: El sobrado
- Commands: Battalion "Zepita" No. 3
- Conflicts: 1872 coup d'état War of the Pacific: Tacna and Arica campaign

Marcelino Gutiérrez Chávez (31 May 1829 – 9 December 1904) was a Peruvian colonel who had a minor role in the coup d'état headed by his brother Tomás Gutiérrez against then president José Balta on 22 July 1872, being the only one of his brothers to survive the riots caused in the aftermath of Balta's murder on 26 July.

== Early life ==
Gutiérrez was born in Huancarqui to a family of Spanish descent in 1829, the son of parents Luis Gutiérrez and Julia Chávez. In 1849, he enlisted, along with his three brothers in the Peruvian Army, with Tomás distinguishing himself above the others. He was described by historian Jorge Basadre as having a gentle character.

Marcelino Gutiérrez married Mercedes Vargas in Lima's San Marcelo Church on 8 November 1869. Vargas was from Arequipa, the legitimate daughter of Manuel Vargas and Andrea Rojas Zúñiga. His brother Tomás sponsored the ceremony. He had five children with her, all born in Arequipa: Rosa Mercedes (1869), María Mercedes Hortensia (1877), María Natalia (1882), Leonor Angélica (1887) and Carmela Emperatriz Emiliana (1890). He was also the father of María Eliselda Eduarda, baptized on 28 October 1866, in the same church, whose mother was Josefa Revolledo.

== Military career ==
Gutiérrez was first promoted to corporal in 1851, becoming second sergeant in August and first sergeant in November of the same year. He was promoted to junior lieutenant in 1854, and retired from active duty in 1855, rejoining in 1856. On 11 January 1858, he received his lieutenant's office, climbing ranks in the military hierarchy since then: in 1858 he was a graduated captain, in 1862 an effective captain, in 1862 graduated major, effective major in 1865, graduated lieutenant colonel in 1865, in 1867 an effective lieutenant colonel and in 1868 a graduated colonel. He served under Torrico, Echenique, Castilla and Balta.

Gutiérrez, who was in command of Battalion "Ayacucho" No. 4 (formerly Column "Paucarpata" No. 2), stationed at Santa Catalina barracks, had a very minor role in the coup d'état headed by his three brothers. Initially given refuge by a friendly family, he attempted to flee to the port of Callao, but was later imprisoned and put on trial. Through an amnesty law he was released eight months later.

Gutiérrez participated in the defence of Arequipa during the War of the Pacific. In 1880, he was ordered by Nicolás de Piérola to organise the Battalion "Peruvian Legion" (Legión Peruana), whose command he assumed until July, which formed part of the Vanguard Division headed by Manuel Leyva. Despite having the authorisation to march towards Tacna to assist the army stationed there, the division reached Moquegua and returned to Arequipa.

== Death ==
Gutiérrez later moved to Arequipa, where he died of heart attack in 1904.

== See also ==
- Tomás Gutiérrez
- Silvestre Gutiérrez
- Marceliano Gutiérrez

== Bibliography ==
- Basadre Grohmann, Jorge Alfredo (2005) [1939]. Historia de la República del Perú [History of the Republic of Peru] (in Spanish). Vol. 7 (9th ed.). Lima: Producciones Cantabria. ISBN 978-612-306-360-3.
