= Carlos Manuel Chávez =

- Born: December 25, 1931 (age 94); Cajamarca, Peru
- Education: Universidad Nacional Mayor de San Marcos
- Known for: Involvement in first human heart transplant, Pioneering coronary artery bypass
- Awards: Scientific Award silver medal (American Medical Association); Honor Achievement Award (Angiology Research Foundation)
- Medical career
- Field: Cardiovascular and Thoracic Surgery

Carlos Manuel Chávez (born December 25, 1931) is a Peruvian cardiovascular and thoracic surgeon. He is recognized for his involvement in the first human heart transplant and for pioneering the coronary artery bypass. He performed the first coronary artery bypasses in 1972 in Mississippi, United States, and Monterrey, Mexico.

== Early life and education ==
Chávez was born in Cajamarca, Peru, the youngest of nine children of Nazario Chávez Aliaga (1891–1979). He graduated from the Universidad Nacional Mayor de San Marcos in Lima in the late 1950s. He then moved to the United States, completing his training in cardiothoracic surgery and residency at the University of Mississippi Medical Center in 1961.

In 1962, Chávez began post-graduate training in cardiovascular medicine at the University of Mississippi Medical Center in Jackson. He noted that "The thrust of research at that time was going toward transplantation."

== Heart transplant research and procedure ==
Transplant research at the University of Mississippi Medical Center began in 1956, focusing on operative techniques, organ storage and preservation, and post-operative management.

Chávez visited prominent medical centers to study their transplant trials and errors, and to identify potential animal donors, as human heart donation was largely inconceivable at the time.

=== The 1964 transplant procedure ===
By spring 1963, doctors cautiously planned for a heart transplant. On January 22, 1964, a 68-year-old man in a coma with undetectable blood pressure, whose life expectancy was hours, was admitted.

Initially, a man with a severe brain injury, sustained by a ventilator, was considered as a donor. However, doctors were hesitant to remove life support due to his stable blood pressure, so a chimpanzee was chosen as an alternate donor.

The procedure took place on January 23. The transplanted heart initially beat normally, but effective blood pressure could not be maintained an hour after the cardiopulmonary bypass machine was removed, and two hours after clamp removal. Chávez stated, "The body went into acute rejection of the heart." At the time, few anti-rejection medications were available. Doctors surmised that the heart might have been too small and the patient too weak for a successful transplant.

=== Outcome and recognition ===
Despite the outcome, Chávez and his mentor, James D. Hardy, M.D., demonstrated the feasibility of human heart transplantation. Their effort was later overshadowed by the first successful human-to-human heart transplant performed by Christiaan Barnard, M.D., in Cape Town, South Africa, in 1967. For his transplantation exhibit, Chávez received:

- A Scientific Award silver medal from the American Medical Association at its 1965 convention in New York City.
- An Honor Achievement Award from the Angiology Research Foundation in 1968.

== Later career and private life ==
Chávez temporarily set aside private practice to focus on teaching, having previously served as chief instructor of anatomy and professor of surgery in Lima, Peru.

After approximately 15 years of teaching in Jackson, Chávez sought to return to private practice. He noted, "The only opportunity left for me (at the University of Mississippi) was department chairman, held by Dr. Hardy. It didn’t seem as though he would be stepping down any time soon."

Around this time, a friend practicing in Lubbock, Texas, recruited Chávez. In 1978, Chávez moved his family to Lubbock, where he established a private practice and joined the faculty at Texas Tech University.

In 1982, Chávez relocated to Brownsville, Texas, where he remains active in medicine, though he has not performed transplant procedures in recent years.
