= Nazario Chávez Aliaga =

Peruvian politician (1891–1978)

Nazario Chávez Aliaga (1891–1978) was a Peruvian journalist, politician and poet. Chávez Aliaga played a substantial role in the establishment of Alianza Popular Revolucionaria Americana, the largest political party in Peru from 1930 to the late 1980s, as well as being the publisher of an influential newspaper El Peru. In his later life he served in various political offices including Secretario del Congreso and Secretary General of the Presidency of the Republic (1956-1962).

== Biography ==
He was born on September 22, 1891, in the town of Huauco (now named Sucre) in the province of Celendin in Cajamarca, Perú.

He was professor of literature and Spanish in Colegio San Ramón in Cajamarca. In addition to his teaching, Chavez Aliaga was a journalist and in 1923 started to edit the newspaper El Obrero. This newspaper highlighted ideas of the working class and due to this was closed by the government of Augusto B. Leguía. In spite of this three years later in 1926, Chávez Aliaga returned to journalism as editor of a new newspaper called El Perú which was first published on 28 July 1926. This newspaper allowed Chávez Aliaga to reach the people of Cajamarca both socially and politically. El Perú's content was mixed in that it included articles in favour of policies of Leguía while at the same time reprinted articles by José Carlos Mariátegui from his Amauta magazine. One of these articles that Mariátegui sent to Chávez Aliaga was titled 'On the problem of the Indian'. El Perú showed a clear indigenous tendency and printed articles favoring the protection of the workers and artisans of Cajamarca. Through this newspaper Chávez Aliaga expanded his leadership role in the political arena and highlighted stories such as the restructuring of the most important guild in Cajamarca: The Free Society of Artisans. He also participated in the creation of the Workers Society of Halgayoc, the Workers Society of Bambamarca, the Fraternal Society of Workers in Hualgayoc, and others.

It was around these years that a young Victor Raúl Haya de la Torre brought forth his progressive ideas to create a political party that reached all the corners of Perú. He thus reached out to Chávez Aliaga who was a key political leader in Cajamarca. De la torre knew of Chávez Aliaga from his newspaper and through Antenor Orrego. In 1929, Chávez Aliaga was invited to become the general secretary of the Peruvian Aprista Party (APRA) in Cajamarca. He actively promoted the ideas of APRA and participated in uprisings in favor of workers and farmers in the region. Chávez Aliaga became Prefect of Cajamarca.

Following a particular uprising, there was a severing of relations between Chávez Aliaga and de la Torre. In a final letter written to Haya de la Torre, Chávez Aliaga indicates that he was left behind by the APRA leader to face government troops without support while de la Torre sailed away. There was a feeling of betrayal as evidenced by this letter.

Later, Chávez Aliaga joined the Prado Democratic Movement under the leadership of the eventual president of Perú Manuel Prado Ugarteche. Chávez Aliaga became (1939 - 1945) the Secretary as well as Advisor to the Council of Ministers of the Presidency. In 1950 he was elected to Congress as representative (diputado) from the province of Cutervo; furthermore, he took the post of Secretary for the Chamber of Representatives (Cámara de Diputados).

For Manuel Prado Ugarteche's second government (1959 - 1962), Chávez Aliaga was nominated Secretary General of the Presidency of the Republic.

He died on November 14, 1978, in Lima, Perú.

== Family ==
He was married to Teresa Silva Santisteban of Cajamarca. His sons were: Pompeyo Chávez, Romulo Chávez, Raúl Chávez, Carlos M. Chávez; his daughters were: Blanca Chávez, Fabiola Chávez, Josefina Chávez, Ana María Chávez, and Teresa del Socorro Chávez.

Hijo ilegítimo: Marcelo Chávez Posada

== Awards and honors ==
- Gran oficial de la Orden El Sol del Perú
- Comendador de la Orden al Mérito por Servicios Distinguidos del Perú
- Gran Oficial Servicio Civil del Estado de la República Peruana
- Gran Placa de la Orden del Tesoro Sagrado del Japón
- Order of Merit of the Federal Republic of Germany 1960

== Works ==
In addition to his very active political life, Chávez Aliaga had a large impact in literature as writer and poet. Among his publications one finds a complete work titled Cajamarca. He authored many books such as Vértice, Huerto de Lilas, Parábolas del Ande, Ideario y Acción Parliamentaria, Liberación, Pensamiento en Función de vida y de Historia. Chávez Aliaga also contributed to various newspapers and magazines both Peruvian and international.

== Selected publications ==
- Chávez, A. N. (1973). Autobigrafía: O La vida de un hombre que se realiza en la historia. Lima: Librería Editorial "Minerva" Miraflores.

== Other sources ==
- Olindo Aliaga Rojas and Gutemberg Aliaga Zegarra (2008) Personajes de la historia sucrense, Cajamarca: Martínez Compañon
