= Peruvian Civil War of 1867 =

Civil war in Peru

Peruvian Civil War (1867) Constitutionalist Revolution (1867)
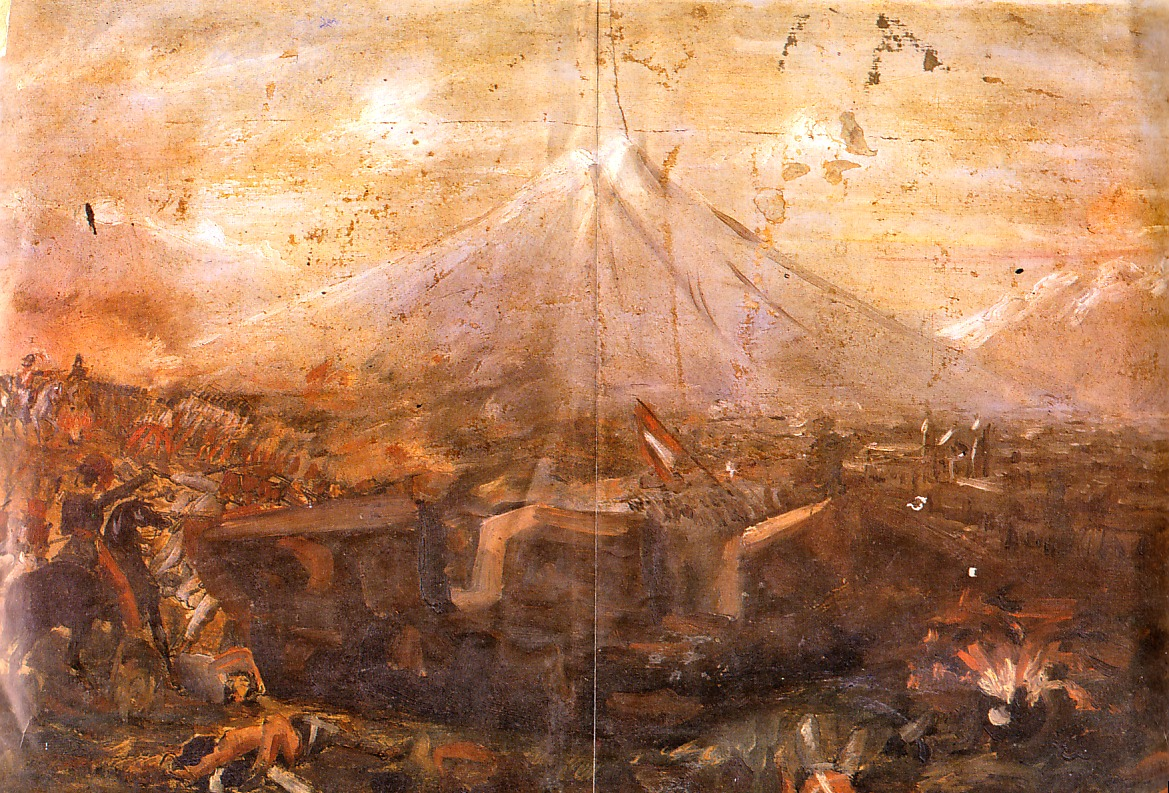
- Print created by Ignacio Merino. On the far left is represented President Mariano Ignacio Prado, mounting his horse and directing the attack on the city. In the background lies the volcano Misti.
Date	1867
Location	Peru
Result	Revolutionary Army victory; Constitution of 1860 restored by the conservatives

Belligerents
Government of Peru (Liberals)	Revolutionary Army (Conservatives)

Commanders and leaders
Ignacio Prado (surrendered)	Pedro Diez Canseco; José Balta; Ramón Castilla #

The Peruvian Civil War of 1867, also known as the Revolution of 1867, was a conflict wherein revolutionary forces led by General Pedro Diez Canseco (in Arequipa) and Colonel José Balta (in Chiclayo) fought against the government under President Mariano Ignacio Prado, whose rule they considered constitutionally illegitimate.

== Context ==
In 1865, General Prado came to power after a victorious revolutionary uprising against the state of General Juan Antonio Pezet. Prado then proclaimed himself dictator and successfully waged the war against Spain, which concluded with the Battle of Callao on May 2, 1866.

With the international conflict resolved, Prado desired to legitimize his government. On July 28, 1866, he issued a decree which called for electing a President of the Republic as well as a Constituent Congress. The latter would be charged with examining the election results and proclaiming the president, upon which they would then focus on the drafting of a new Magna Carta to replace the moderate Peruvian Constitution of 1860. These elections were held in October 1866, in which Prado, without relinquishing his power, ran for President of the Republic with an obvious advantage.

On February 15, 1867, the Constituent Congress was established. And on the same day, Prado was stripped of his dictatorial powers and designated by the Congress as a Provisional President. In the meanwhile, the victor of the October elections Constitutional President was proclaimed. But since Prado was also the candidate chosen by those very elections, this provisional mandate proved to be constitutionally anomalous.

On the other hand, the Constituent Congress, dominated by liberals, dedicated itself to the editing of a new constitution. This incited popular discontent. In defense of the Constitution of 1860, the now veteran Marshal Ramón Castilla organized his final revolutionary act in the province of Tarapacá, but he died in the middle of the desert, around Tiliviche, on May 30, 1867.

However, the revolutionary fervor still burned. The new constitution elaborated by the Congress was strongly liberal, moreso than the Constitution of 1856 which was its model. It was enacted on August 29, 1867. Two days later, Prado was declared President, although he had hardly ruled for a few months.

== Outbreak of revolution ==
The revolution erupted in Arequipa. Citizens refused to swear in the new Constitution and burned it in the Plaza de Armas on September 11, 1867. The revolutionaries raised their banner in defense of the Constitution of 1860. Arequipan general Pedro Diez Canseco was recognized as the leader, for being the vice president of the government [last acknowledged] by the revolutionaries, that of Pezet, despite the end of their reign. The mayor of Arequipa was advised by magistrate and politician Juan Manuel Polar y Carasas. In Lima, Pedro's brother and fellow general Francisco Diez Canseco, also conspired.

Simultaneously, another revolutionary campaign commenced in the north, in Chiclayo, led by Colonel José Balta.

== The Siege of Arequipa (1867) ==
On October 12, 1867, Prado entrusted an army of a little over 3,000 men to the president of the cabinet, General Luis La Puerta. They marched south, with the goal of suffocating the revolution.

Prado disembarked in Islay on October 16 and advanced toward Arequipa, which barricaded itself, following the long republican tradition of resistance owed to its inhabitants. A group of revolutionaries unexpectedly left the city and surprised a pro-government battalion in Congata (a province of the city), a victory that the citizens of Arequipa rejoiced.

On November 19, Prado initiated his first attempt to take the city, resulting in a battle which lasted from five in the morning until six in the evening. On the same day, the siege of Arequipa began. The defenders had constructed trenches to block the path, especially in the waterways of San Lázaro and in the Antiquilla (neighborhoods located in the city's historic center). The latter was intended to halt the enemy if they tried to cross the old bridge, belatedly named "Puente Bolognesi", the Bolognesi Bridge.

The government forces used a 68-inch cannon, with a length of 5 meters, a weight of 5 tonnes, and a radius of 8 kilometers. With every shot, the Arequipans responded with the ringing of bells, uproars, and heavy rifle fire from the parapets. Prado employed another, larger cannon, the Blackley 300, which was transported to Islay with significant difficulty.

A group of revolutionaries, at the command of Colonel Andrés Segura, raided the enemy's rearguard and "spiked the cannon", rendering it unusable. They also destroyed the telegraph lines which connected Arequipa with the coast, in order to delay news sent to the headquarters of the government supporters.

On December 27, 1867, Prado ordered a second assault. The Arequipans, from behind the ashlar parapets, defended the city tenaciously. Even women took part in the battle, pouring buckets of boiling water upon the assailants. Some government soldiers surrendered and even defected to the revolutionaries. Prado then decided to retreat to Lima, with his army reduced to a mere 1,800 of the 3,000 it originally comprised.

== Siege of Chiclayo ==
José Balta was known in Chiclayo as a farmer who rebelled against the Vivanco-Pareja Treaty in 1864, joining forces with the then-Colonel Prado in the revolution against Pezet's government, whom they accused of weakness when faced by the significant demands of the Spanish Pacific Squadron. But when Prado became unpopular as president, Balta had no qualms with leading a rebellion in Chiclayo, commanding 150 poorly armed men.

When government forces advanced upon Chiclayo, Balta proposed for the people flee to Huaraz, in order to avoid the devastating consequences of a direct conflict. But the citizens of the city refused to leave. Balta then organized the defense of the city and established his headquarters on the premises of the Colegio San José. According to anecdotal accounts, the mayor had the writer Ricardo Palma as secretary (who wrote about the siege in one of his works) and Carlos Augusto Salavery, another famous literati, as a wartime chronicler. During this period a dance known as the conga was popularized, and accompanied by this song:

De los coroneles,

¿cuál es el mejor?

El coronel Balta

se lleva la flor.

Which approximately translates to:

Of the colonels,

who is the best?

Colonel Balta

Takes the contest.

For 26 days, the Chiclayans successfully held their own against the more numerous and well-armed government troops.

== Prado's surrender and the end of the war ==
Failing in his mission to capture Arequipa, Prado embarked towards Callao, where he arrived on January 5, 1868. A town hall gathering demonstrated popular discontent towards the government, and Prado saw himself obligated to renounce his position over to General Luis La Puerta. But on January 8th, General Francisco Diez Canseco arrived and assumed provisional power until January 22, when it was passed to his brother General Pedro Diez Canseco. Thus, Pedro Diez Canseco assumed the provisional presidency for the third time (as he had done so previously in 1863 and 1865).

The Constitution was re-established and elections were reconvened, which resulted in the victory of José Balta.

== See also ==
- Peruvian Civil War of 1834
- War of the Confederation
- Peruvian Civil War of 1856–1858
- Peruvian Civil War of 1865
- Peruvian Civil War of 1884–1885
- Peruvian Civil War of 1894–1895
