= General Secretariat of the Presidency (Peru) =

Government agency of Peru

General Secretariat of the Presidential Office
- Secretaría General del Despacho Presidencial

Secretariat overview
- Type: Secretariat of State
- Jurisdiction: Peru
- Secretariat executive: Benito Roberto Villanueva Haro, General Secretary
- Parent department: Presidency of the Nation

The general secretariat of the presidential office (Spanish: Secretaría General del Despacho Presidencial) is the body responsible for providing technical and administrative assistance to the President and the Vice Presidents of the Republic of Peru.

Its current officeholder, whose title is that of general secretary (Spanish: Secretario General), is Benito Roberto Villanueva Haro, since October 16, 2025.

== List of officeholders ==
- Fernando Casós Flores (1872)
- Nazario Chávez Aliaga (1956–1961)
- Julio Vargas Prada (1961–1963)
- Álvaro Llona Bernal
- Julio Quintanilla
- Oswaldo de Rivero Barreto
- Gustavo Silva Aranda
- Juan Garland Combe
- Luis Macchiavello (1975–1980)
- Óscar Maúrtua de Romaña (1980–1985)
- Enrique Cornejo Ramírez (1985–1986)
- Víctor Díaz Lau (1990–1993)
- José Kamiya Teruya (1995–2000)
- José Elice Navarro (2000–2002)
- Fernando de la Flor Arbulú (2002)
- Guillermo Gonzales Arica (2002–2003)
- Luis Chuquihuara Chill (2003–2005)
- Nicolás Roncagliolo Higueras (2005)
- Ysmael Núñez Sáenz (2005–2006)
- Luis Nava Guibert (2006–2011)
- Luis Chuquihuara Chill (2011–2012)
- María Elena Juscamaita Arangüena (2012–2016)
- María Lila Iwasaki Cauti (2016–2017)
- Nicolás Fernando Rodríguez Galer (2017–2018)
- Mirian Maribel Morales Córdova (2018–2020)
- José Elice Navarro (2020)
- Félix Alcides Pino Figueroa (2020–2021)
- Bruno Pacheco Castillo (2021)
- Carlos Jaico Carranza (2021–2022)
- Enrique Ernesto Vilchez Vilchez (2022-2025)
- Benito Roberto Villanueva Haro (2025-present)

== See also ==
- Presidency of Peru
