= José Allende =

Peruvian politician

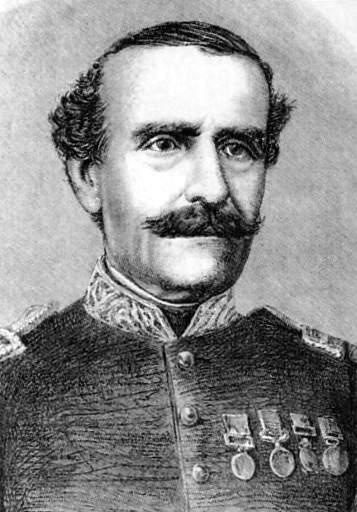
José Allende (1793-1873) Peruvian military man and politician. President of the Council of Ministers and Minister of War and Navy (1853-55, 1864-65 and 1871)

José Allende (1793 – June 29, 1873) was a 19th-century Peruvian soldier and politician, who was born in Lima. As a soldier he fought for the independence of Peru between 1820 and 1824. As a politician, he served three times as Minister of War and the Navy (1853-1855; 1864-1865 and 1871), and was then Prime Minister of Peru (August 2, 1871–1872).

Preceded by José Balta	Prime Minister of Peru; August 2, 1871 – 1872	Succeeded by José Jorge Loayza

== Bibliography ==
- Basadre, Jorge: Historia de la República del Perú. 1822 - 1933, Octava Edición, corregida y aumentada. Tomos 4, 5 y 6. Editada por el Diario "La República" de Lima y la Universidad "Ricardo Palma". Impreso en Santiago de Chile, 1998.
- Tauro del Pino, Alberto: Enciclopedia Ilustrada del Perú. Tercera Edición. Tomo 1. AAA/ANG. Lima, PEISA, 2001. ISBN 9972-40-150-2
