= Lima Tramway =

Former public transport system in Lima, Peru

Lima Urban Tramway
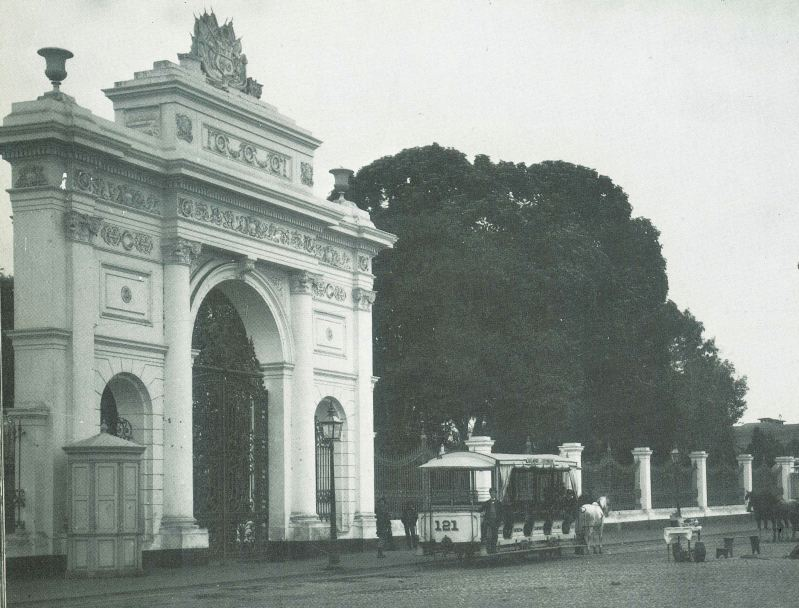
- A tram passing by Neptune's Gate in the Park of the Exhibition, c. 19th century

Overview
- Native name: Tranvía Urbano de Lima
- Owner: Compañía Nacional de Tranvías S.A. (CNT) (Note: Formerly: Empresa del Tranvía de Lima (1878–1898); Compañía del Ferrocarril Urbano de Lima Limitada (1898-1934))
- Line number: 4
- Daily ridership: 150 (early 20th century)

Operation
- Began operation: March 24, 1878
- Ended operation: October 1965
- Number of vehicles: 67 (c. 1900)

Technical
- Track gauge: 1,435 mm (4 ft 8 1/2 in) standard gauge
- Average speed: 30 km/h (19 mph)

The Lima Tramway (Spanish: Tranvía de Lima) was a mass transportation system that serviced the city of Lima, as well as then neighbouring Callao, Magdalena del Mar, Miraflores, Barranco and Chorrillos, inaugurated in 1878 and closed in 1965.

In 1826 the Peruvian government facilitated the construction of a railway network, becoming the first country in South America with this type of transport. Years later, the steam railway, which began its activities in 1851, between Lima and Callao was the second in South America, after Guyana, built in 1848.

== History ==
=== Horsecar era ===
The first proposal to implement a tramway system in Lima was proposed by business partners Manuel Magán and Santiago Coloy in October 1862, being rejected due to both requested an exclusive privilege over the system. On September 29, 1876, a new proposal for the construction of a Horsecar by Mariano Antonio Borda was approved, with a contract being signed with the Municipality of Lima on the same year.

The system was serviced by twenty trolleys distributed in four routes:

Number	Route
1	Descalzos - Exposición
2	Matienzo - Santa Clara
3	Monserrate - Cercado
4	Pampilla - San Cristóbal

=== Electric era ===
The tramway started its conversion to electric traction from 1902 to 1906, with two more lines being built starting in Lima and ending in Callao and Chorrillos. The latter was inaugurated by president Manuel Candamo on February 17, 1904, at that time not yet reaching Chorrillos, but Barranco.

In 1910 four urban tram lines in Lima were reopened and the existing network was extended as follows:

Number	Route	Length
1	Desamparados - Malambo	2,5 km
2	Monserrate - Cinco Esquinas	7,4 km
3	Camal - Santa Rosa	2,8 km
4	Matienzo - Santa Clara	2,5 km
5	Malambito - Cocharcas	7,0 km
6	Exposición - Puente Balta	5,4 km
7	La Victoria - Viterbo	2,5 km
8	Santo Domingo - Colmena	1,6 km

In October 1924, during the second government of Augusto B. Leguía, a strike took place that temporarily paralyzed the system.

=== End of service ===
The service began to collapse in the 1960s, as the number of trolleys had been steadily decreasing for at least a decade. The system had also been the target of a negative press campaign by local newspaper, La Prensa de Lima, who accused the CNT of mismanaging the tram system. A strike took place on September 18, 1965, which was one of the final events in the company's history, as it dissolved soon after.

=== Wagons in display ===
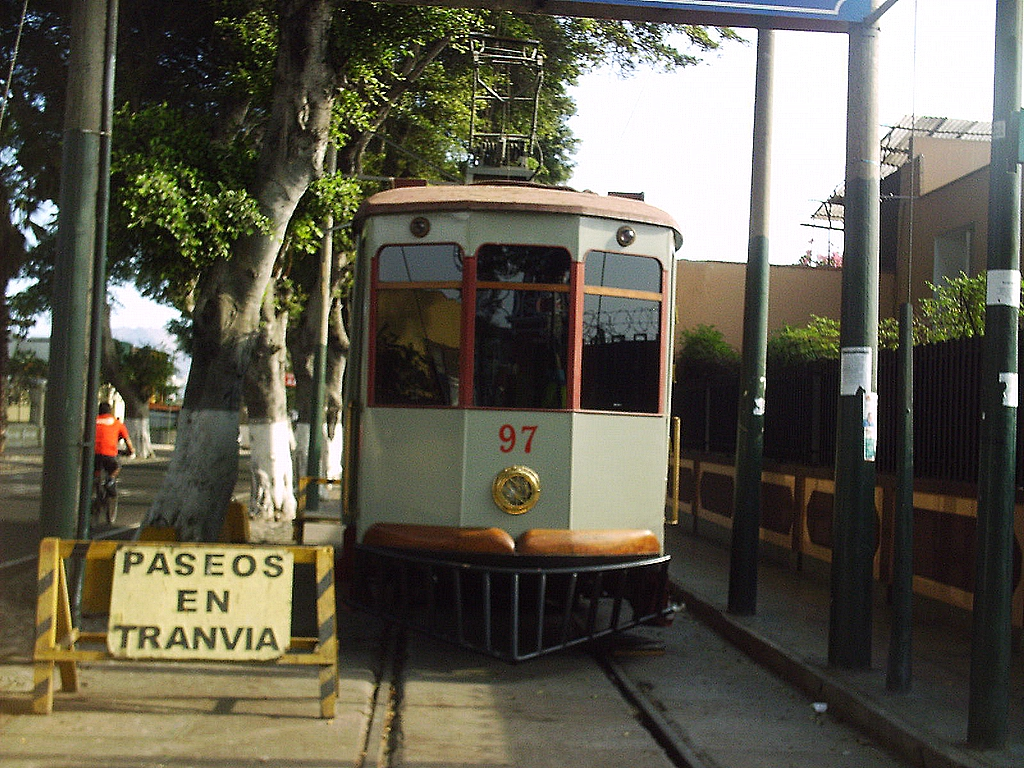
The trolley in Barranco.

A Remembrance Wagon was officially inaugurated by Prime Minister Alberto Pandolfi, on the Avenida Pedro de Osma, in Barranco, on the night of August 22, 1997, when a group of workers from the former CNT started it up, immediately carrying out the first trip. The project was carried out by the Museum of Electricity in coordination with the Municipality of Barranco.

Another trolley built in 1870 that began its service on September 10, 1909, being part of the Lima–Guadalupe route, was auctioned off in 2001 by the Empresa Nacional de Ferrocarriles del Perú and bought by José Jaime Elías Pérez, who converted the wagon into the Expreso Virgen de Guadalupe restaurant, currently located close to the Municipality of Barranco and the main square of the district.

After the wagon's contract renewal was rejected, it was put up for sale in 2020, becoming another business financially affected by the COVID-19 pandemic in Peru.

== Gallery ==
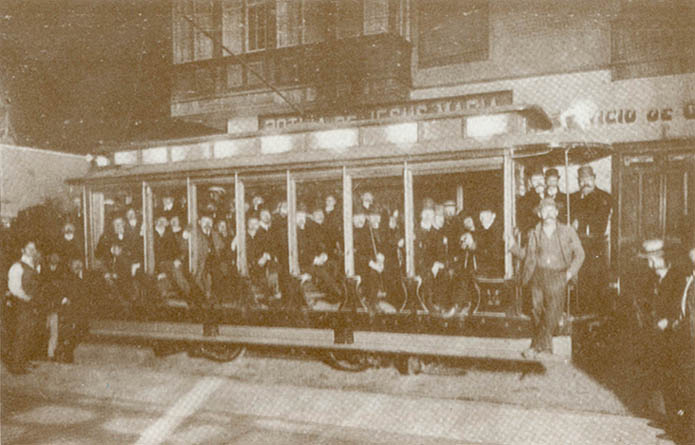
The electric trolley during its inauguration on June 1, 1906.

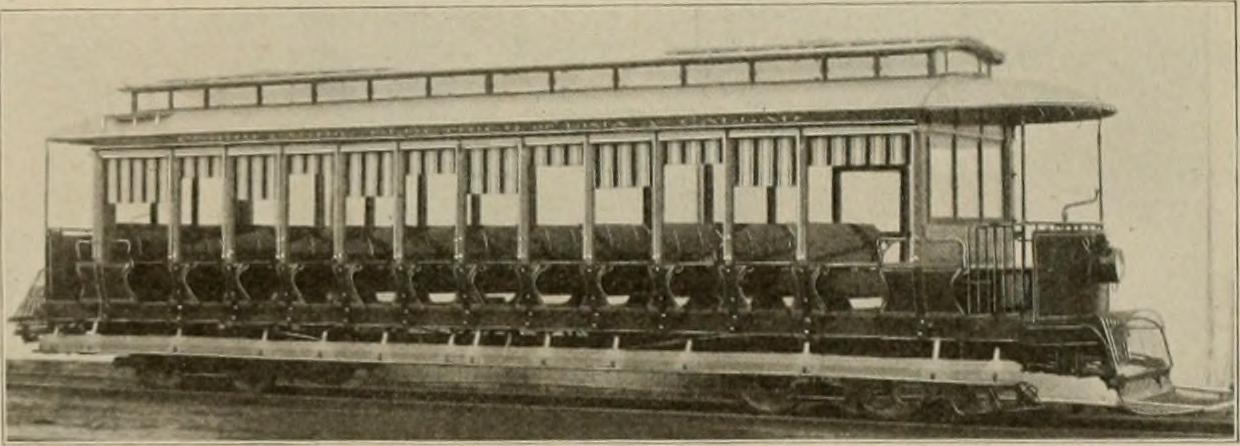
A trolley that would be later used in the Lima–Magdalena del Mar route.

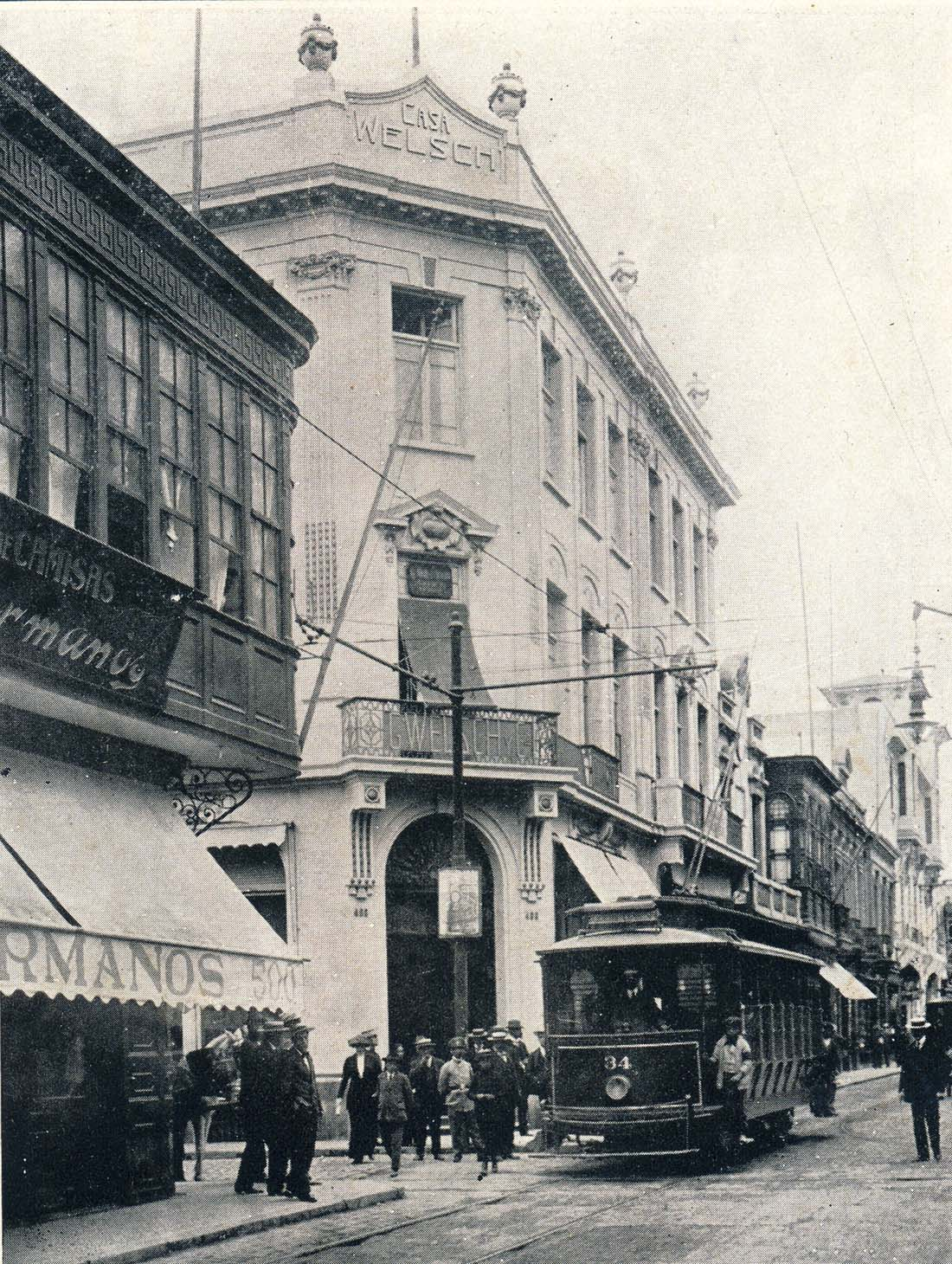
John Stephenson Co. brand trolley in the Jirón de la Unión, circa 1910.

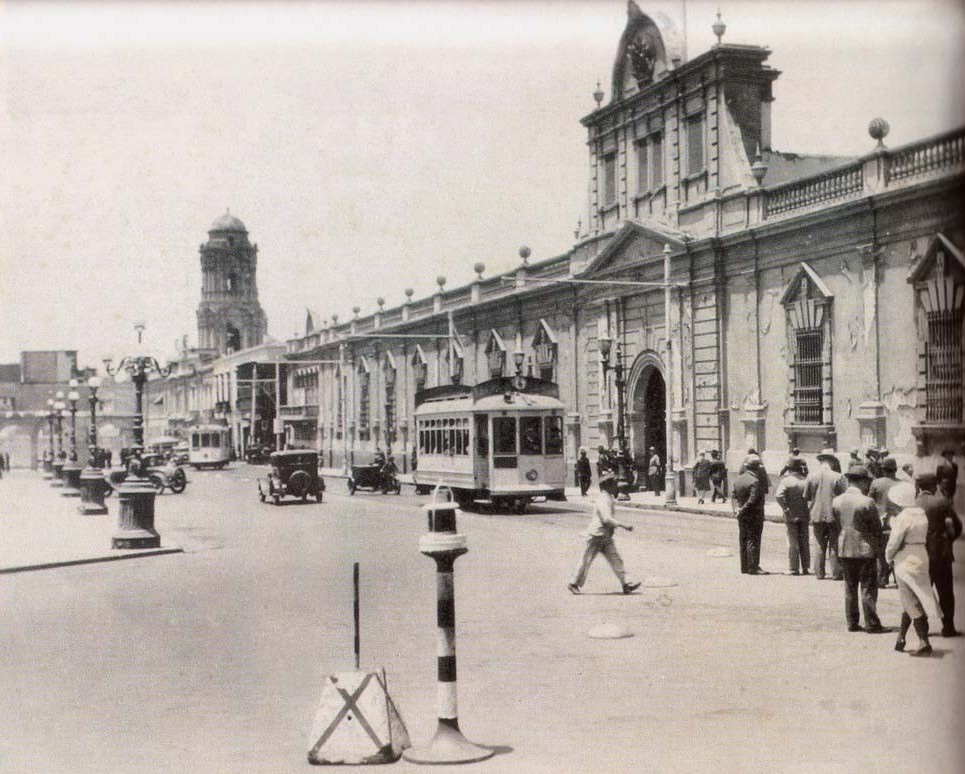
A trolley driving past the former Government Palace in 1932.

== See also ==
- Metropolitano (Lima)
- Lima Metro
