= José Balta =

President of Peru from 1868 to 1872

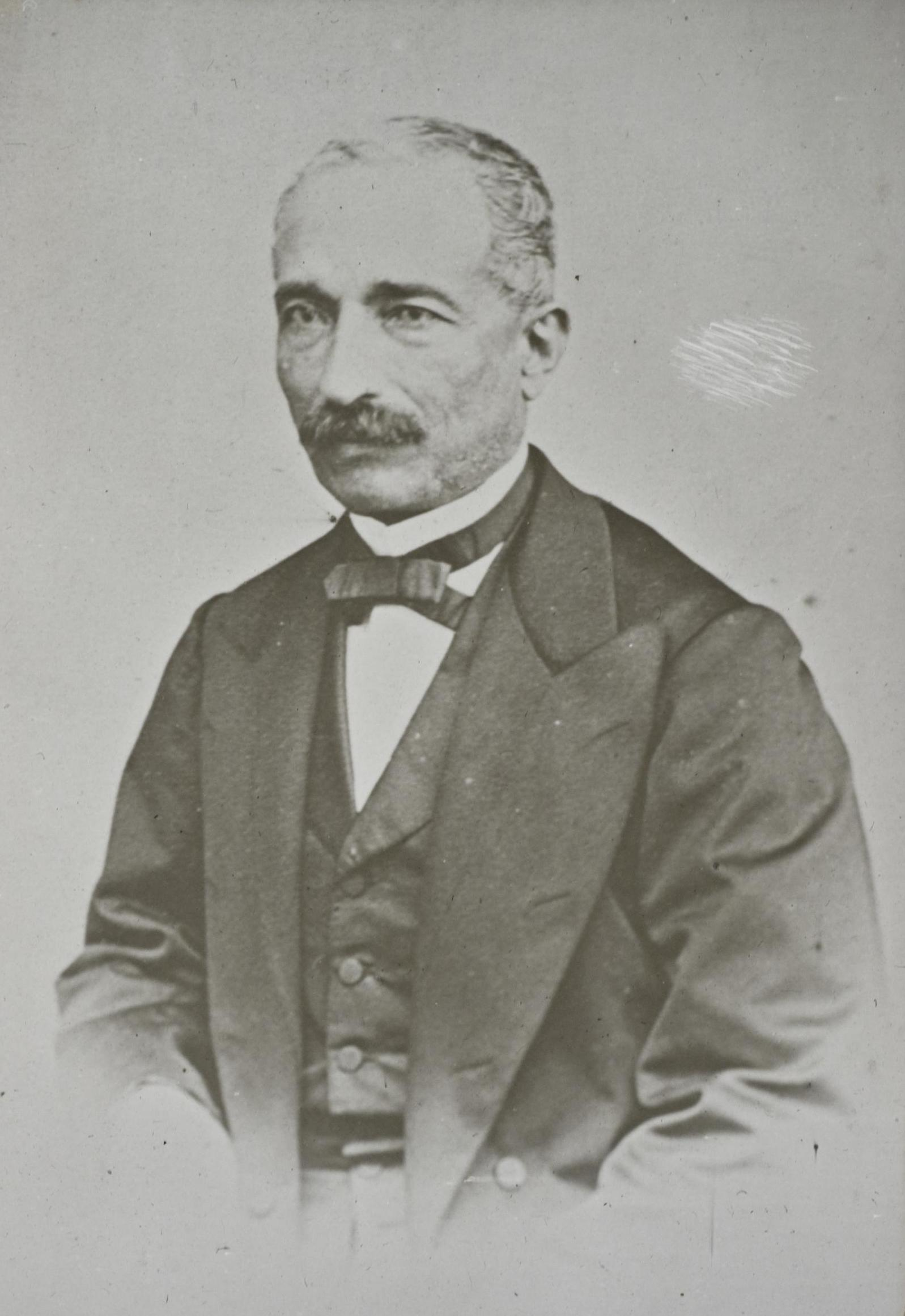
- José Balta, c. 1871

President of Peru
- In office 2 August 1868 – 22 July 1872
- Prime Minister: José Allende
- Vice President: Mariano Herencia Zevallos; Francisco Diez Canseco
- Preceded by: Pedro Diez Canseco
- Succeeded by: Tomás Gutiérrez

13th Prime Minister of Peru
- In office 2 August 1868 – 2 August 1871
- Preceded by: Antonio Arenas
- Succeeded by: José Allende

Personal details
- Born: 25 April 1814 Lima, Viceroyalty of Peru, Spanish Empire
- Died: 26 July 1872 (aged 58) San Francisco de Asís barracks, Lima, Peru
- Party: Independent (Conservative)

José Balta y Montero (25 April 1814 – 26 July 1872) was a Peruvian soldier and politician who served as President of Peru from 1868 to 1872. He was the son of John Balta Bru and Agustina Montero Casafranca.

In 1865, he aided Mariano Ignacio Prado in the seizure of the presidency and served in his administration. In 1867, he in turn overthrew Prado. As president, he re-established constitutional rule and undertook vast projects for national improvement. He granted a monopoly of guano export to a French company and obtained large loans in Europe, yet the lavish expenditures of his administration plunged Peru deep in debt. Balta was deposed and shot by a disgruntled member of his own cabinet, Defense Minister Tomás Gutiérrez during his subsequent coup d'état attempt.

== Early career ==
José Balta y Montero embraced a military career from an early age. At only 16 years of age he entered the Military College in 1830, from which he graduated three years later with the rank of sergeant. By the age of 38, he already had the rank of colonel. In 1855, he joined the cause of Luis José de Orbegoso (1834), that of Felipe Santiago Salaverry (1835) and the Restoration (1838 to 1839).

In 1865, he joined the rebellion of Pedro Diez Canseco and Mariano Ignacio Prado against President Juan Antonio Pezet. He participated in the Battle of May 2, but the following year he distinguished himself among the opponents of president Prado, who exiled him to Chile.

José Balta returned to Peru in 1867 and led a movement against the Prado in Chiclayo, which was echoed in Arequipa, where he rose with General Pedro Diez Canseco. Both refused to swear under the new Constitution of 1860, which was proclaimed in force.

Mariano Ignacio Prado, then traveled south to quell the rebellion, but under pressure from both Balta and Diez-Canseco, and exercised by the Congress from Lima, he was forced to resign. The interim presidency fell for the third time and in the general veteran Pedro Diez Canseco became president.

Before the first month of his term, on February 6, Diez Canseco called for presidential elections, in which Balta actively campaigned. In that contest, he got 3168 votes, against 384 for Manuel Costas and 153 for his main rival, Manuel Toribio Ureta, who represented the Liberals. Balta wore the presidential sash on 2 August 1868.

== Presidency of the Republic ==
Under his administration, Balta began opening the country to foreign capital. Nicolás de Piérola, the appointed Minister of Finance, tried to resolve the financial crisis that choked Peru by surrendering what would become the exploitation of Guano to the French-Jewish company Dreyfus. This put him at odds with the local oligarchy.

The money from the agreement was used for the construction of railways and other projects. This was one of the main legacies of the Balta government. By the year 1861, Peru only had a 90-mile railroad system, but by 1874, it became a 947 miles system. At the same time, besides the railroads, several major projects were also realized: new piers on the coasts, major avenues in Lima and new bridges in the coast. One such example is the bridge now named after him, built between 1869 and 1919.

However, not having enough money to pay contractors for railway construction, the government began to ask Dreyfus for advances in guano revenues, which led to a large increase in the already huge debt. President José Balta, facing the economic crisis, appointed Nicolás de Piérola, a political conservative and a democrat, as finance minister in 1868. Piérola requested authorization to Congress to negotiate directly (no consignment) the sale of guano abroad in a volume that bordered the two million metric tons. The French Jewish house "Dreyfus Hnos" accepted the proposal.

The contract between the Peruvian government and the house Dreyfus was signed on 17 August 1869 and was approved by Congress on 11 November 1870. The contract went ahead despite protests from the Peruvian capitalists or consignees.

By 1879, the rail system had 1,963 miles of track.

== Elections and murder ==
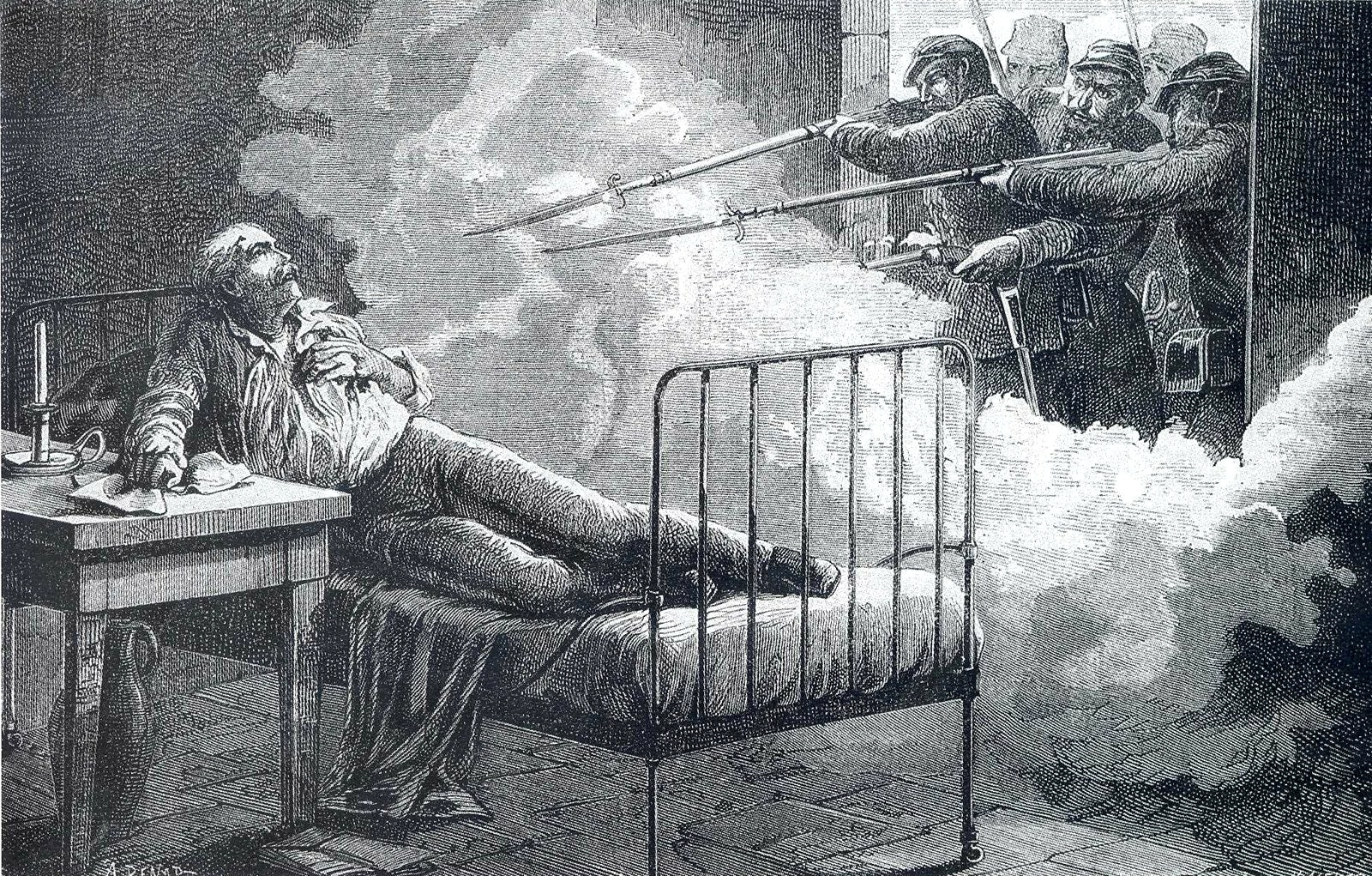
Engraving of Balta's execution

In 1871, with very close elections, rumors circulated that Juan Francisco Balta, brother of head of state, and prime minister at the time, would run for president. However, on the advice of Nicolás de Piérola, this did not happen. Balta, therefore, decided to support the candidacy of former President José Rufino Echenique, but he too declined nomination. Finally, the third candidate, Antonio Arenas was the one who received the full support of Balta.

The contenders were Manuel Toribio Ureta Arenas, who was a repeat candidate, and Manuel Pardo y Lavalle, then Supreme Prosecutor. The latter's campaign was overwhelming, and in 1872 was established as the first civilian president in the history of the Republic of Peru.

Although José Balta had been tempted to remain in power by the Gutiérrez brothers (Tomás, who was Minister of War, and his brothers Silvestre, Marceliano and Marcelino, all with the rank of Colonel and commanding several battalions), he ultimately declined to do so, a situation rare in the history of Peru. That year, 1872, July 22, Tomas Gutiérrez, the then minister, led a rebellion to proclaim himself Supreme Head of the Republic.

That same day, President Balta was taken prisoner when he went to meet with Miguel Grau Seminario and Aurelio García y García, the two highest ranking naval officers at the time. Through the mediation of these two great military men, the Navy did not provide support for the rebellion of Tomas Gutiérrez, and did not recognize his government, sending out the entire squadron out to sea in order to prevent ships from falling into the plotters' hands.

Likewise, Lima's population disagreed, and one of the conspirator brothers, Silvestre Gutiérrez, died on 22 July 1872 in one of the many skirmishes in the capital. In retaliation for his brother's death, Marceliano Gutiérrez gave order to kill José Balta y Montero; he was shot in his bed by three lower-ranked officers. This led some days later to the overthrow and brutal lynching of Tomás Gutiérrez, whose body was hanged from a high tower and then dropped hard on the street, and then set on fire along with the corpses of Silvestre and Marceliano. (Marcelino, who had only half-heartedly supported his brothers, was jailed and stripped of his military honours, and only redeemed himself by fighting in the War of the Pacific against Chile).

In the 1990 presidential election, Colonel Balta's great-grandson Nicolás de Piérola Balta (also a great-grand nephew of President Nicolás de Piérola) was a candidate.

== Work and legacy ==
1. In 1869 he founded the School of Agriculture.
2. Founded Ancón and constitutional province of Tarapacá.
3. Construction of pier dock in Callao.
4. Construction of the Lima-Callao and Lima-Huacho.
5. Salaverry Port Trust.
6. Construction of the "Palace of the Exhibition", currently the Museum of Art.
7. Founded the neighborhood of La Victoria.
8. He built the Cathedral of San Marcos de Arica, and the office of the same city (now Chile).

Political offices
Preceded by Antonio Arenas	Prime Minister of Peru; 1868–1871	Succeeded by José Allende
Preceded by Pedro Diez Canseco	President of Peru; 1868–1872	Succeeded by Tomás Gutiérrez
