= Juan Buendía =

Peruvian general

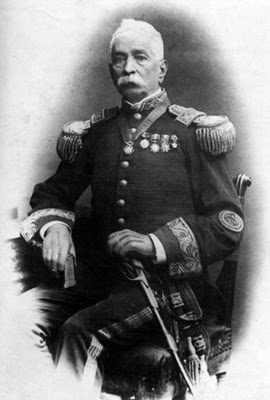

Premier of the Government of Peru
- In office 4 June 1877 – 13 May 1878
- President: Mariano Ignacio Prado
- Preceded by: Teodoro La Rosa
- Succeeded by: José Jorge Loayza

Minister of Government, Police and Public Works
- In office 4 June 1877 – 13 May 1878
- Preceded by: Manuel González de la Cotera
- Succeeded by: Fernando Palacios

Prefect of Lambayeque
- In office 1875–1876

Minister of War and Navy (Interim)
- In office 6 October 1876 – July 1877
- Preceded by: Pedro Bustamante
- Succeeded by: Antonio de la Haza

Deputy of the Republic of Peru for Lima (Lima)
- In office 1859–?

Deputy of the Republic of Peru for Moyobamba (Loreto)
- In office 28 July 1872 – 10 July 1876

Personal details
- Born: 1816 Lima, Peru
- Died: May 27, 1895 (aged 78–79) Lima, Peru
- Awards: Shield of honor to the besieged of Callao (1834); Medal to the victors of Ucumarca (1834); Reputable of the Fatherland (1839)

Military service
- Allegiance: Peru
- Branch/service: Peruvian Army; Restoration Army of Peru
- Years of service: 1834–1891
- Rank: Divisional general
- Commands: Northern Division (1866); Army of the South (1879–1881)
- Battles/wars: Peruvian Civil War (1834): Battle of Ucumarca; Battle of Huaylacucho; War of the Confederation: Battle of Yungay (WIA); Peruvian Civil War (1841); Peruvian-Bolivian War: Battle of Ingavi; Siege of Tarapacá; Battle of Motoni; Liberal Revolution of 1854: Battle of La Palma; Peruvian Civil War (1856–58): Siege of Arequipa; Peruvian Civil War (1865); Chincha Islands War: Battle of Callao; War of the Pacific: Tarapacá campaign; Battle of Pisagua; Battle of San Francisco; Battle of Tarapacá; Lima campaign; Battle of San Juan; Battle of Miraflores

Juan Domingo Buendía y Noriega (1816 – May 27, 1895) was a Peruvian military general who served as Prime Minister of Peru from 1877 to 1878. He commanded the Army of the South, which saw controversial action in the Tarapacá campaign of the War of the Pacific. He was also prefect of Lima, Cuzco, Arequipa, Tacna and Lambayeque, as well a deputy for Moquegua and Minister of War and Navy.

| Preceded by Teodoro La Rosa | Prime Minister of Peru; 1877-1878 | Succeeded by José Jorge Loayza |
