= College of Our Lady of Guadalupe =

School in Peru

- Primer Colegio Nacional Benemérito de la República Nuestra Señora de Guadalupe
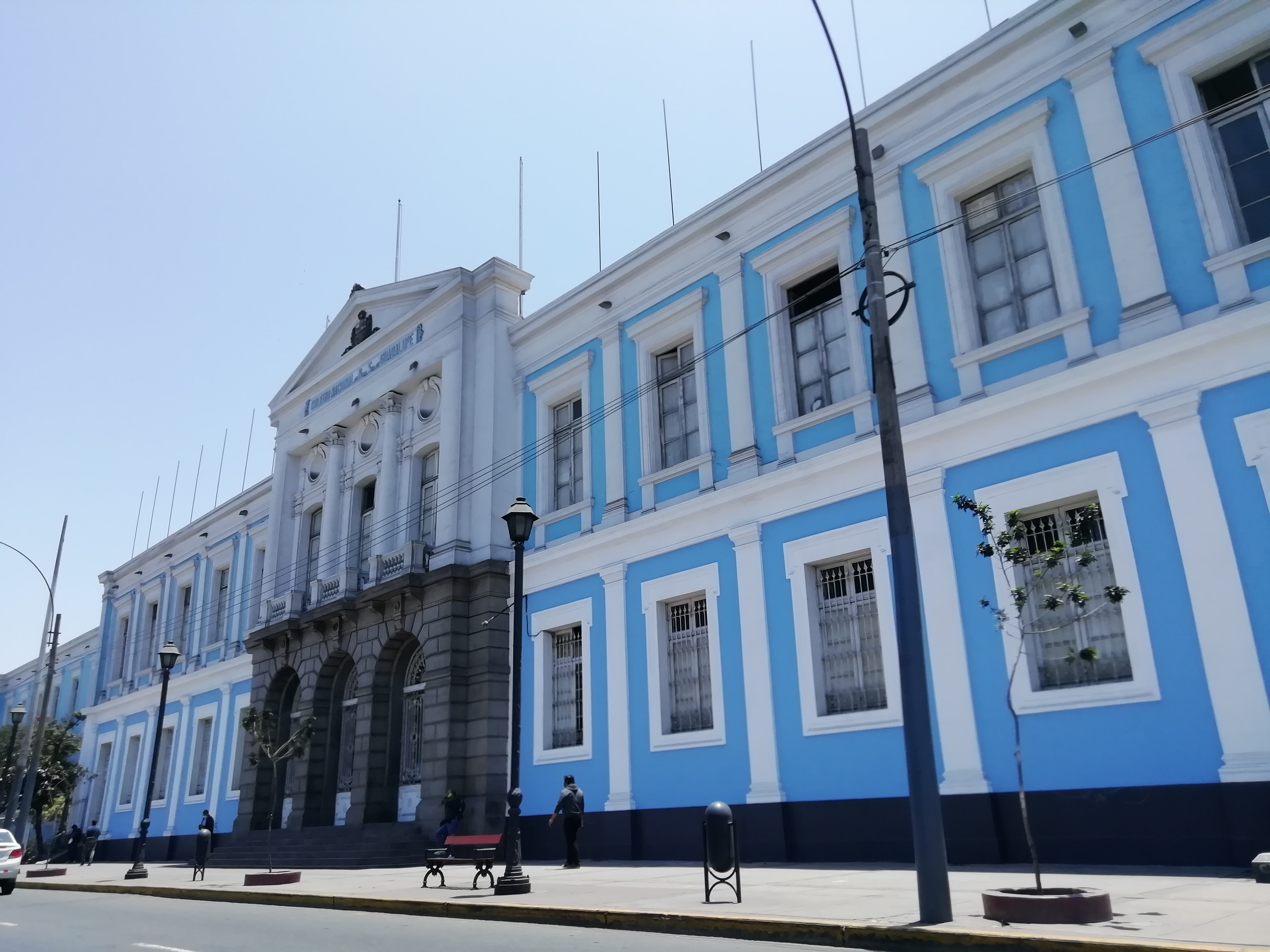
- Avenida Alfonso Ugarte s/n, Lima, Lima; Peru

Information
- Type: Public School (I.E.E.)
- Motto: Guadalupe, Crisol y antorcha de peruanidad (Guadalupe, Crucible and torch of Peruvianness)
- Religious affiliation: Secular
- Established: 14 November 1840
- Founders: Domingo Elías, Nicolás Rodrigo
- School district: UGEL 03 – Lima
- Director: Dr. Oscar Walter Tello Rodríguez
- Gender: Male
- Language: Spanish
- Colour: Celeste
- Website: colegioguadalupe.edu.pe

The College of Our Lady of Guadalupe (Note: Known in Spanish by its official name: Primer Colegio Nacional Benemérito de la República Nuestra Señora de Guadalupe, as well as with the names of Institución Educativa Emblemática Nuestra Señora de Guadalupe or Primer Colegio Nacional Benemérito y Patrimonio de la Educación del Perú de "Nuestra Señora de Guadalupe".) is a secular public education school in Lima, Peru. Originally founded on Chacarilla Street in the Guadalupe neighbourhood on November 14, 1840, it moved in 1909 to its current location on Alfonso Ugarte Avenue, built during the government of Augusto B. Leguía.

The college has played an important function in the doctrinal, intellectual and political life of Peru. Many of its alumni have stood out in different professional fields.

== History ==
=== Early 19th century ===
In 1839, during the second government of President Agustín Gamarra, there were already numerous state and private educational establishments in Lima aimed at careers as lawyers, priests or doctors, so a preparatory or elementary school was necessary. Driven by this motivation, landowner Domingo Elías and the wealthy Spaniard Nicolás Rodrigo, in a notice published on November 14, 1840, announced that they had decided to open the school for the next year, placing it under the immediate direction of a priest.

The school was inaugurated on February 7, 1841 as a private establishment dedicated to primary education, occupying the recently renovated premises of the Estanco de Tabaco donated by the government, located on Chacarilla Street, in the vicinity of the current University Park and behind the current Javier Alzamora Valdez Building. Mr. Ramón Azcarate, a distinguished Spanish sailor, was hired as vice-rector, and Father Fray Juan Vargas was hired as chaplain. It was on the latter's initiative that the school adopted the name of Our Lady of Guadalupe. Initially, the following classes were taught: Spanish Grammar, Geography and Mathematics, taught by Azcárate; Religion, by Brother Juan Vargas; first letters and French by Professor Blanco Batlles; drawing, by Ignacio Merino; and music, by Mateo Rosas and Miguel Távara. The number of students reached 40.

In 1842, Domingo Elías hired the services of the liberal Spaniard Sebastián Lorente as rector of the campus. Lorente's presence meant the elevation of the quality of teaching, making the Guadalupe school a center for upper secondary education and, furthermore, the ideological antagonist of the San Carlos Convictory, a bastion of conservatism, whose rector was the famous religious Bartolomé Herrera.

Sebastián Lorente was succeeded by the Gálvez brothers (José and Pedro Gálvez Egúsquiza), former students of the San Carlos Convictory. The academic, ideological and political rivalry between these schools (Guadalupe, supporter of liberalism and San Carlos, defender of conservatism) and their representatives persisted until 1852, the year in which Colegio Guadalupe was closed by President José Rufino Echenique.

=== Late 19th century ===
In 1855, the liberal revolution triumphed and the new president, Marshal Ramón Castilla, promulgated a new Regulation of Public Instruction. The school was nationalised by decree of April 7, 1855, and recategorised as a secondary school; That is, it was cut off from providing higher education. However, it continued to maintain its prestige and educational quality during the second half of the 19th century.

Many Guadalupeans joined as volunteers in the battle of Callao on May 2, 1866. It was precisely there that the Minister of War José Gálvez Egúsquiza, who had been rector of the school in 1851, was killed in action.

=== War of the Pacific ===
During the War of the Pacific, many Guadalupanos enlisted in the battalions that went to fight in the provinces of Tarapacá and Arica. After the defeat of the southern armies, Lima prepared for defense. Teachers and students from the school enrolled in the Reserve Battalion No. 2 commanded by Manuel Lecca and which defended the capital in Redoubt No. 1 of Miraflores. History records the courage that the Guadalupanos displayed in the battle of Miraflores, fought on January 15, 1881. Among those who fell in action were César Figueroa Toledo and Manuel Fernando Bonilla; The latter, who was only 13 years old, was destroyed by an enemy grenade. Many were injured and others managed to survive. Among them, Enrique Echecopar, Pedro Dávalos, Arturo Menaut and Abel Trefogli.

After their victory, the Chilean Army occupied Lima. In August 1881, the school's premises were taken over by the Chileans, who temporarily converted it into a barracks. Given this fact, the few belongings that remained were put into safekeeping. Shortly after, it was reopened as a private institute, with authorization from the Council, but the government of Francisco García Calderón once again granted it national status. In 1882, Cesáreo Chacaltana Reyes assumed its direction; However, shortly after he had to go into exile. His successor, Manuel Marcos Salazar, also had to leave Lima in 1883, persecuted by the occupation authorities. The new director, Ricardo Saavedra, was in charge of moving the school to the traditional building on Chacarilla Street. Once the war ended and the Chilean troops were repatriated, the school was another example of the vandalism and pillage unleashed by the invaders on Peruvian soil: laboratories, cabinets, natural history museum and library had disappeared or were in rubble; even the floors and doors were missing.

=== National Reconstruction ===
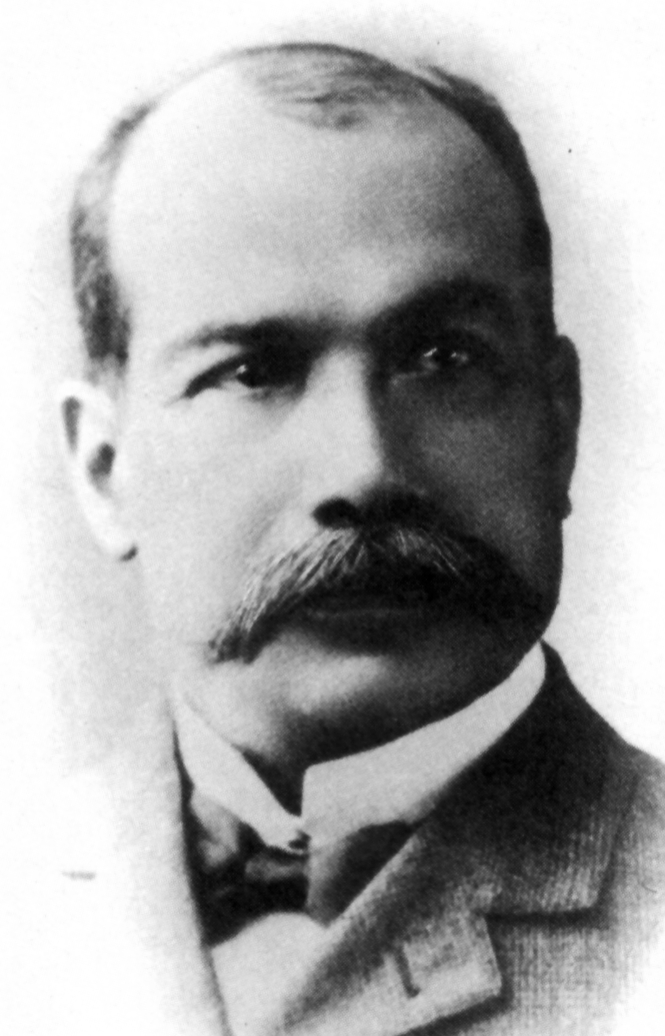
Pedro A. Labarthe (1855-1905).

In 1884, the director Pedro A. Labarthe carried out intense efforts to renovate the school, a work that he had to carry out in order to avoid its total deterioration. Given the shortage of resources, the possibility of closing the school was considered, which was avoided by the dismissal of the teaching staff, who had already carried out their work without pay during the Chilean occupation. The school year of 1884 was completed and in 1885 the economic hardship was partially alleviated, as Congress awarded the school the income from the Santa Beatriz hacienda, thanks to the efforts of the deputy Francisco M. Fernández, who since then was known as the "Benefactor".

From 1886 to 1899, Sebastián Lorente Benel (son of the teacher and historian of the same name) served as its director, who was responsible for restoring the institutional life of the school to its normality, despite the economic hardship. One of the characteristics of this direction was the rigid discipline implemented, for which there was support from military training inspectors. The motivated conflict between Lorente and a group of reformist professors led to the former's retirement. After the interim direction of Francisco Romero, a Belgian mission arrived in 1903 that was in charge of reforming the campus, with one of its members, Julio Becker, assuming direction.

Under the second government of Nicolás de Piérola (1895-1899) the initiative was taken to build a new building for the school. The Haussmann commission, from France, recommended its new location on the current Alfonso Ugarte Avenue, with the school forming part of a boulevard with the Loayza Hospital, Bartolomé Herrera, Plaza Dos de Mayo, etc. This walk followed the trace of the former walls of Lima.

On September 22, 1897, the departmental board approved the acquisition of the land, measuring 19,913 m². In 1898 the government opened a public competition, from which two projects were presented; None was chosen, and the architect Maximiliano Doig was entrusted with the project.

Doig took over the work from June 1899 to 1905, then it continued under the direction of Ratouin until 1909, finally the architects Salazar and Rafael Marquina y Bueno took over.

=== 1909 move ===
The school occupied its new headquarters in 1909. The chapel and the rear block were completed in 1911. It was conceived to satisfy the European model educational system, which is why its layout is a grid, forming six patios, each of them intended for one school activity (court of honor, courtyard of recreational activities: auditorium, chapel, and three classroom courtyards). The boarding school was located on the second level and in the service yard was the school, dining room, instruction workshops, warehouses, among others. Belgian and German missions were also hired to change the curriculum and govern the campus. They were in charge of importing the most modern educational cabinets of the time (museums of Economics, Natural Sciences, Electricity, Physics, Chemistry, etc).

The construction of the Chapel began in 1907, being completed and inaugurated on July 15, 1911, with President Augusto B. Leguía and his wife being the sponsors. It currently houses the image of the Virgin of Guadalupe on its main altar, crowned in 1962 as "the Patroness of the Student Youth of Peru." The chapel represents over time the Catholic faith of all the students and teachers who, by tradition, accompany in a mass and procession, during the eve of the institution's anniversary, normally held on November 13 of each year (or occasionally, on previous days).

It was during the first decades that the school once again abandoned university training (and the school taught the first years of general university studies) assuming school training up to the age of sixteen.

The Peruvian educational system of the first half of the 20th century was meritocratic. Thus, the school had several annexes, distributed in various parts of the city. The best students from those annexes and from the national schools in the provinces were selected to study at the central location on Alfonso Ugarte Avenue. There was also an annual admission exam. In the mid-1950s, during the government of General Manuel A. Odría these annexes became large school units (such as the GUE Alfonso Ugarte or GUE Mariano Melgar).

In 1959, by ministerial decree, taking into account its age and history, the school received the title of "First National School of Peru." The decree was signed by Dr. Jorge Basadre, former Guadalupano and minister of education at the time.

During the 1950s, the education system changed to the American model; It is the stage of large school units. The new educational system demanded large areas for which the Guadalupe school was not prepared. For this reason, their transfer was planned to the outskirts of the centre of Lima, in the district of Fray Martín de Porres (current district of Los Olivos). The former students managed to manage land where the "School City" would be built and which would legally be administered by a Board of Trustees. made up of various stakeholders in the College. Unfortunately, political interests led to the illegal invasion of the land with the approval of the government in power (1985-1990). The stadium did not suffer the same fate, since it was located no more than a kilometre from what should have been the School City, located on Angélica Gamarra Avenue, between the Panamericana Norte and the Jorge Chávez International Airport.

=== "Commando" uniform ===
The familiar school attire that was known as “Commando” was created as an alternative to solve the economy of parents, due to its variety of use and its durability. Mr. Alfredo Maccera, manager of the textile manufacturing division of the “Reiser & Curioni” house, began to sketch a design that would meet the most required conditions to dress school youth and, above all, at a low cost. The year was 1948, and the director of the National School of Guadalupe was the then Commander Gonzáles Iglesias, who had the idea of an outfit that typified the Guadalupe student.

Maccera and Gonzáles Iglesias had several conversations and, after studying the pros and cons, the first “Comando” model emerged, designed exclusively for the Guadalupe school. That year, Guadalupe won unanimous approval for its uniform in its presentation in the National Holidays parade. The Minister of Education at the time, General Juan Mendoza, took interest in the Guadalupe experience, which is why he recommended, starting in 1949, according to a supreme resolution, the use of the new uniform in national and private establishments.

=== 200-mile march ===
Teachers and students from the school participated in a march, led by the director, Miguel Tipián Valenzuela. They headed to the nearby American Embassy to express their rejection of a law that violated the sovereignty of the two hundred miles, as stated on a flyer on that occasion.

=== 1956 school ticket incident ===
In 1956, in Lima as in other places, there were no differentiated passages, with the exception of a workers' fare until 7 in the morning. In June it was reported that there would be an increase in fares, in which case the night school's students marched to the premises of "El Comercio" and "la Prensa" to express their formal rejection. The students were beaten with rods and thirteen of them were arrested and taken to El Sexto Prison by Civil Guard agents. That episode motivated the next day, the students of the day school and all other schools to join the movement. On June 27, control slipped out of the hands of the police. Several buses were burned, one of them in front of the Ministry of Education. Dozens of students were arrested and five were reported dead. Finally the authorities relented and ordered the validity of the school ticket.

=== 1970 changes ===
Under the military government of Juan Velasco Alvarado, the boarding school regime ceased to exist, the offices that formulated and managed the Educational Reform of 1973 were installed on the second floor and due to the high demand for student admission, the afternoon and morning system changed to a two-shift regime: one in the morning, one in the afternoon, being able to meet the student request of the time.

== Administration ==
The main facilities of the school, located in the Historic Centre of Lima, are considered part of the Cultural heritage of Peru, therefore its physical administration depends on the coordination between the corresponding departments of the Ministry of Culture and the Ministry of Education. Inside its facilities, it has the chapel, the gymnasium, four patios each with classrooms around it, a central patio around which the library, the computer room, and the administrative offices are located. Each of these spaces has a second floor that was once used as a boarding school. In its classrooms, secondary education is provided to more than 1,400 students.

A stadium, known as the Estadio Guadalupano, is located in the district of San Martín de Porres, also in Lima, it is intended for physical culture and the practice of sports. It has two regulation size soccer fields, one of which has bleachers on the western side and an athletic track. In addition, it has a swimming pool and three sports slabs, dressing rooms, among other services.

== Asociación Guadalupana ==
The Asociación Guadalupana is the official institution for the school's graduates.

In 1940, commemorating the first centennial of the school's foundation, the various classes met in the Campus Assembly Hall and under the presidency of Melitón Porras Osores, the various commissions that would shape the new institution were named. It was up to Francisco Tudela y Varela, a figure in Peruvian diplomacy, to preside over the organising commission of the association.

An office was provisionally rented as headquarters, located in the Hidalgo Building No. 138 in the Plaza San Martín. The Association later moved to its new headquarters located at Calle Belén No. 1074, in the centre of the city of Lima. This mansion witnessed great civic-cultural and patriotic events attended by ministers of states, as well as presidents of the Republic, such as Dr. Manuel Prado y Ugarteche and the architect Fernando Belaúnde Terry.

The alumni association has its main headquarters on Alfonso Ugarte Avenue in Lima, just two blocks from the school. This new location was achieved thanks to the work of engineer Alejandro Bertello Bollati, class "G21" of 1921, who donated the aforementioned location, and who was lifelong president of the association. The premises were inaugurated in 1960 with the assistance of the President of the Republic, Manuel Prado Ugarteche. The association also officially has its Alumni branch in the United States of America, founded under the presidency of Dr. Pedro Ruiz.

== See also ==
- Education in Peru
