= Manuel María Gálvez Egúsquiza =

Peruvian politician (1837–1917)

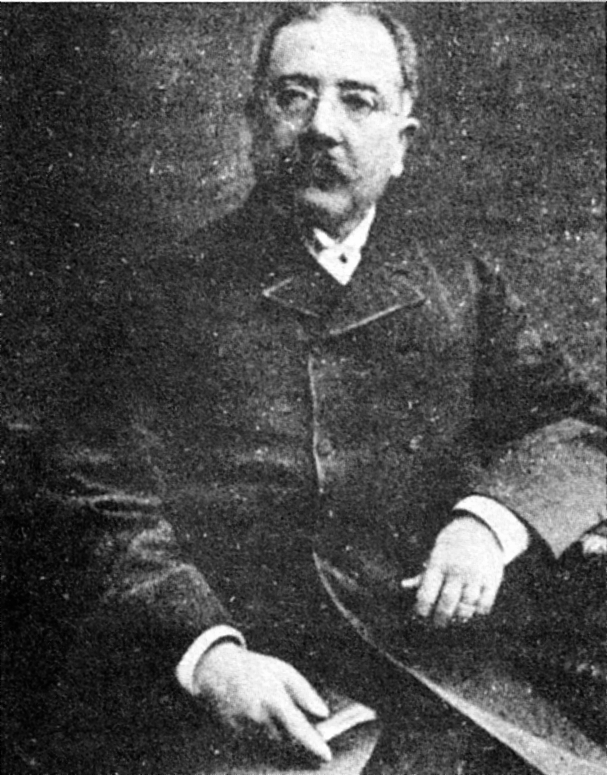

Prime Minister of Peru
- In office 8 September 1899 – 14 December 1899
- President: Eduardo López de Romaña
- Preceded by: José Jorge Loayza
- Succeeded by: Enrique de la Riva Agüero

Minister of Foreign Affairs
- In office 8 September 1899 – 14 December 1899
- President: Eduardo López de Romaña
- Preceded by: Melitón Porras
- Succeeded by: Enrique de la Riva Agüero
- In office 12 March 1881 – 6 November 1881
- President: Francisco García Calderón
- Preceded by: Aurelio García y García
- Succeeded by: Aurelio García y García

Senator of Cajamarca
- In office 1 March 1884 – 2 May 1885

Constituent Deputy for Quispicanchi (Cuzco)
- In office 1 March 1884 – 12 September 1885
- In office 28 July 1881 – 12 September 1881

Deputy for Celendín (Cajamarca)
- In office 28 July 1876 – 23 December 1879

Deputy for Cajabamba (Cajamarca)
- In office 28 July 1868 – 28 July 1876

Personal details
- Born: 1 October 1837 Cajamarca, Peru
- Died: 27 March 1917 (aged 79) Lima, Peru
- Party: Civilista
- Parents: José Gálvez Paz (father); María Micaela de Egúsquiza (mother)
- Education: National University of San Marcos

Manuel María Gálvez Egúsquiza (1 October 1837 – 27 March 1917) was a Peruvian lawyer, magistrate, university professor and politician.

He was Minister of Foreign Affairs in the government of Francisco García Calderón, during the Chilean occupation in the middle of the War of the Pacific, being arrested and confined in Chile together with said president for refusing to sign peace with territorial cession (1881). During the government of Eduardo López de Romaña he was president of the Council of Ministers and again Minister of Foreign Affairs (1899). He was also a representative and senator of the Republic, and prosecutor of the Supreme Court, as well as professor of Civil Law and dean of the Faculty of Jurisprudence of the National University of San Marcos.

== Early life ==
Born to a prominent family of Spanish descent, he was the son of colonel José Manuel Gálvez Paz and María Micaela Egúsquiza y Aristizábal. He was the youngest of the Gálvez brothers, who had an important role in Peruvian political life: José Gálvez Egúsquiza (1819-1866), liberal leader and Secretary of War, who was killed in action in the Battle of Callao; and Pedro Gálvez Egúsquiza (1822-1872), also a liberal leader and magistrate.

He studied at the College of Our Lady of Guadalupe (1849-1854), then directed by the Spanish teacher Sebastián Lorente and his brothers José and Pedro Gálvez. He then went to the Convictorio de San Carlos, where he graduated with a bachelor's degree in Jurisprudence in 1858 and graduated as a lawyer in 1860. During those years he also worked as a professor of History at Guadalupe.

== Career ==
During the second government of Ramón Castilla he was appointed member of the accredited diplomatic legation in Spain and France, headed by his brother Pedro Gálvez (1860-1864). Back in Peru, he devoted himself to the exercise of his profession. He was secretary of the Consulate Court (1865-1868) and professor of Mathematics at the Military College. In 1869 he graduated as a doctor of Jurisprudence and became a professor of Civil Law in San Marcos.

He was elected owner or holder deputy for Cajabamba, a position he held from 1868 to 1876, in the governments of José Balta and Manuel Pardo y Lavalle. He was later elected to Celendín, a position he held from 1876 to 1879, during the government of Mariano Ignacio Prado, until the coup perpetrated by Nicolás de Piérola, in the middle of the War of the Pacific. He was also part of the Departmental Council of Lima (1876).

After the occupation of Lima by the Chilean Army in January 1881, he participated in the Board of Notables that supported Francisco García Calderón in his election as provisional president. He then assumed the position of Minister of Foreign Affairs, forming part of the ministerial cabinet chaired by Aurelio Denegri (12 March 1881). He managed to get Chile to grant the character of a neutral zone to the town of La Magdalena, where the seat of the national government of Peru was installed.

He is also registered as a deputy for the province of Quispicanchi before the National Assembly of Ayacucho convened by Nicolás de Piérola in July 1881. This congress accepted Piérola's resignation from the position of Dictator that he had taken in 1879 and named him provisional president. However, the development of the war generated the loss of power of Piérola, so this congress did not have much relevance.

As Chancellor of the Republic, he advised President García Calderón, deploying a vast political and diplomatic activity, which aroused the suspicion of the Chileans. One of his most important tasks was to resist Chilean pressure for Peru to sign peace with territorial cession and extensive compensation, for which it was not long before he suffered reprisals from the invader. On 28 September 1881, the Chileans, through one faction, suspended all authority in Lima other than that emanating from their occupation headquarters. On 6 November, accused of having disobeyed said order, Gálvez was arrested along with President García Calderón. They were deported to Quillota, Chile, by orders of Admiral Lynch.

In Chile, he participated in the peace efforts initiated by the Brazilian minister Juan Duarte Da Ponte Ribeyro, which did not come to fruition. In June 1882 he was allowed to return to Peru. He then resumed his San Marcos professorship, but for refusing to pay quotas to the Chileans he suffered continuous mistreatment.

After the signing of peace with Chile, he was elected dean of the Faculty of Jurisprudence (1883-1887). In 1884 he was part, as a representative of Quispicanchi, of the Constituent Assembly called by President Miguel Iglesias after the signing of the Treaty of Ancón, the same one that put an end to the war. This assembly not only ratified the treaty but also confirmed Miguel Iglesias as provisional president, which led to a civil war, from 1884 to 1885. The revolutionaries, led by General Andrés Avelino Cáceres, triumphed and overthrew Iglesias.

He was dean of the Lima Bar Association (1885-1886) and, with the reinstatement of democracy in the first government of Andrés Avelino Cáceres, he was elected senator for the department of Cajamarca, a position he held from 1886 to 1887. At that time, He was also part of the Advisory Commission on Foreign Relations, a body created by the Executive.

On 10 September 1887, he was appointed prosecutor of the Supreme Court, for which he abandoned teaching and devoted himself to the exercise of the magistracy. In 1888 he traveled to Montevideo, to be named, along with Cesáreo Chacaltana, as Peruvian delegate to the International Congress of Private International Law.

Already at the end of the 19th century, he was appointed President of the Council of Ministers and Minister of Foreign Affairs of the recently inaugurated government of the engineer Eduardo López de Romaña, but in these positions he lasted only three months (from 8 September to 14 December 1899).

== Later life ==
He was president of the National Club (1897-1899). He retired in 1908 and died in 1917.

== Bibliography ==
- Basadre Grohmann, Jorge Alfredo (2005a) [1939]. Historia de la República del Perú [History of the Republic of Peru] (in Spanish). Vol. 8 (9th ed.). Lima: Producciones Cantabria. ISBN 9972-205-70-3.
- —— (2005b) [1939]. Historia de la República del Perú [History of the Republic of Peru] (in Spanish). Vol. 9 (9th ed.). Lima: Producciones Cantabria. ISBN 9972-205-71-1.
- —— (2005c) [1939]. Historia de la República del Perú [History of the Republic of Peru] (in Spanish). Vol. 10 (9th ed.). Lima: Producciones Cantabria. ISBN 9972-205-72-X.
- —— (2005d) [1939]. Historia de la República del Perú [History of the Republic of Peru] (in Spanish). Vol. 11 (9th ed.). Lima: Producciones Cantabria. ISBN 9972-205-73-8.
- Dancuart, Pedro Emilio (1954). Crónica parlamentaria del Perú. Historia de los congresos que han funcionado en la República desde 1822 (1865-1869) [Parliamentary Chronicle of Peru. History of the congresses that have functioned in the Republic since 1822 (1865-1869)]. Lima: Impr. de la Revista.
- Gálvez Montero, José Francisco; García Vega, Enrique Silvestre (2016). Historia de la Presidencia del Consejo de Ministros (1820-1956) [History of the Presidency of the Council of Ministers (1820-1956)] (in Spanish). Vol. 1. Lima: Empresa Peruana de Servicios Editoriales. ISBN 978-87-93429-87-1.
- Tauro del Pino, Alberto (2001). Enciclopedia Ilustrada del Perú [Illustrated Encyclopedia of Peru] (in Spanish) (3rd ed.). Lima: PEISA. ISBN 9972-40-149-9.
