= Pedro Gálvez Egúsquiza =

Peruvian politician and diplomat

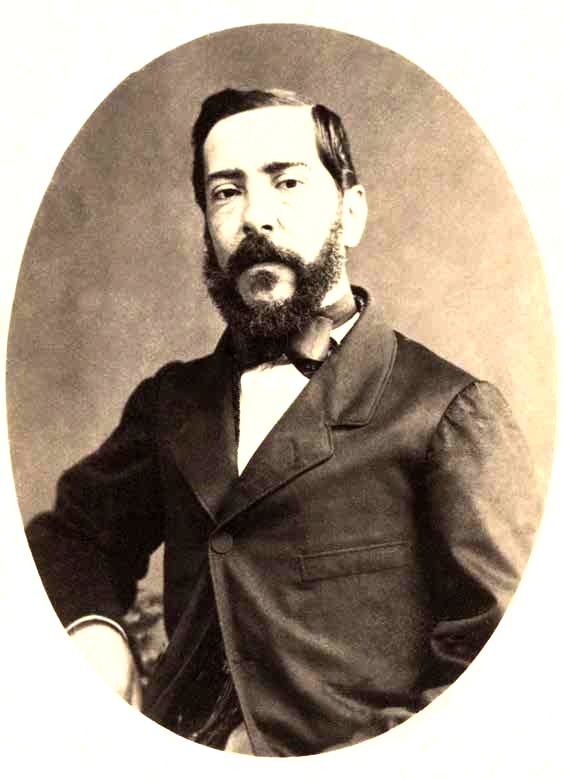

Prime Minister of Peru
- In office August 2, 1868 – April 13, 1869
- President: José Balta
- Preceded by: Antonio Arenas
- Succeeded by: Juan Francisco Balta

Minister of Government, Police and Public Works
- In office August 2, 1868 – April 13, 1869
- Preceded by: Antonio Arenas
- Succeeded by: Manuel Ferreyros

Minister of Finance and Commerce
- In office July 25, 1862 – October 8, 1862
- President: Ramón Castilla
- Preceded by: Manuel de Mendiburu
- Succeeded by: Manuel Toribio Ureta

Minister of Justice, Worship and Beneficence
- In office January 5, 1855 – August 25, 1855
- President: Ramón Castilla
- Preceded by: Blas José Alzamora Seminario
- Succeeded by: Juan Manuel del Mar

Ambassador to New Granada, Venezuela and Central America
- In office August 5, 1856 – 1857

Ambassador to Spain
- In office 1859–1859
- Preceded by: Joaquín José de Osma

Ambassador to France
- In office September 27, 1860 – 1860
- In office 1862–1864

Ambassador to the United Kingdom
- In office 1869–1875
- Preceded by: Manuel N. Porturas
- Succeeded by: Mariano Ignacio Prado

Senator of Cajamarca
- In office April 28, 1868 – January 23, 1869

Constituent Deputy for Pasco (Junín)
- In office July 14, 1855 – November 2, 1857

Personal details
- Born: April 28, 1822 Cajamarca, Peru
- Died: August 23, 1872 (aged 50) Paris, France
- Parent(s): José Gálvez Paz; María Micaela de Egúsquiza
- Education: National University of San Marcos

Military service
- Allegiance: Peru
- Branch/service: Peruvian Army
- Years of service: 1854–1855
- Rank: Colonel
- Battles/wars: Liberal Revolution of 1854

Pedro Gálvez Egúsquiza (Cajamarca, April 28, 1822 – Paris, August 23, 1872) was a Peruvian lawyer, politician, educator and diplomat. A staunch liberal, he was one of the leaders of the Liberal Revolution of 1854 headed by General Ramón Castilla. He is remembered for having been the drafter of the decree that abolished the tribute of the natives. He was Minister of Justice and Worship in 1855, and Minister of Finance and Commerce in 1862, in the second government of Ramón Castilla; President of the Council of Ministers and Minister of Government (1868–1869) in the government of José Balta; constituent deputy (1855–1857) and senator (1868–1869). Likewise, he exercised various diplomatic representations in the United States, Latin America and Europe.

== Early life ==
Son of Lima colonel José Manuel Gálvez Paz and María Micaela Egúsquiza y Aristizábal. Two of his brothers also became notable characters: José Gálvez Egúsquiza (1819–1866), a liberal leader who was killed in action during the Battle of Callao; and Manuel María Gálvez Egúsquiza (1838–1917), magistrate and politician.

He studied at the College of Sciences and Arts in his hometown, directed by the priest Juan Pío Burga. He for a time helped his father in the agricultural work of his farm; then, in 1842, he entered the Convictorio de San Carlos, where he graduated as a doctor of Jurisprudence (1845).

== Career ==
Received as a lawyer, he became part of the faculty of the College of Our Lady of Guadalupe (1846), becoming rector of the same from 1850 to 1852, replacing Sebastián Lorente, being succeeded by his brother José Gálvez. He turned that school into a forum for liberal ideas, in rivalry with the convictorio de San Carlos, a forum for conservatives, led by the clergyman Bartolomé Herrera.

Luis A. Eguiguren commented on the Guadalupe–San Carlos discrepancy between liberal Gálvez and conservative Herrera:

Herrera's feisty action stimulates the liberals to defend their principles. In the press they reflect his ideas; but the organized center that should take its place in the controversy is the Colegio de Guadalupe. Herrera was charged with the responsibility of educating the youth of the Convictorio through retrograde ideas. His favorite disciple, the caroline (Note: The term Caroline Spanish: Carolino, a comes from the name of the San Carlos convictorio, specifically from Carlos, and refers to a member of said institution.) Pedro Gálvez, as a teacher from Guadalupe, emerged in controversy and ideological action to capture youth and guide it along the path of liberalism. In this way, the Colegio de Guadalupe faces San Carlos. The fight is established on the principles: at that time San Carlos represents tradition, severe order, rigid discipline; Guadalupe, on the other hand, displays the spirit of freedom, of democracy without resounding surnames, of secularism, of popular blood that comes from anonymous surnames. The dispute takes the form of personal incidents as the Guadalupanos and Carolinos fight in the streets with their bare fists. (Note: The Guadalupe College were neighbors of the Colegio de San Carlos in what is today the "Casona" de San Marcos and the Colegio de Guadalupe on Calle de la Chacarilla, Jr. Apurímac blocks 4 and 5, behind the building that housed the Ministry of Education throughout the second half of the 20th century) The controversy must have been so bitter that the differences between those who represented a spirit and an orientation reached Congress. Indeed, in 1849 Bartolomé Herrera and Pedro Gálvez became deputies. Both turned the parliamentary tribune into a propaganda tribune. The two leaders of different ideological currents intervened in two notable debates: on the election of bishops and on the suffrage of the indigenous people. Herrera endorsed the point of view that suffrage should be suppressed for the Indians; [Pedro] Gálvez delivered an impassioned argument against the views of the rector of San Carlos, arguing that ability [that is, the level of education] was not the origin of political rights, affirming that certain requirements were but product of artificial demands of society. The vote was in favor of Gálvez.

— Luis A. Eguiguren

He also contributed to the organization of the Progressive Club, a group with a liberal tendency, the first test of a political party, the same one that launched the first civil candidacy for the presidency of the Republic in 1851, embodied in the figure of the caudillo Domingo Elías, the same one that was defeated by General José Rufino Echenique.

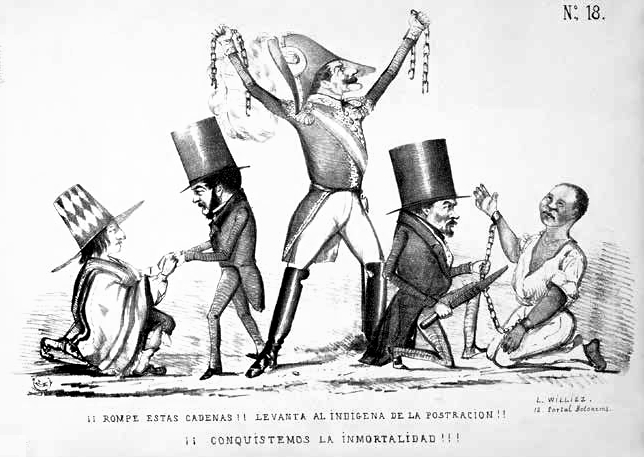
Cartoon in which President Ramón Castilla appears as the redeemer of the indigenous population and black slaves. On the right, Manuel Toribio Ureta cuts the chains of a slave and on the left Pedro Gálvez shakes hands with an Indian.

Under Echenique's government, Pedro Gálvez was a member of the commission in charge of drafting the Civil Code project (1851–1852). Along with his brother José, he joined the 1854 revolution led by General Ramón Castilla. Once the revolutionary government was installed in Arequipa, he was appointed General Secretary (sole minister), and as such, he drafted and signed the decree abolishing the Indian tribute on July 5, 1854.

Once the general secretariat was dissolved, two ministries were created to replace it: the Government, Foreign Affairs, War and Navy; and that of Worship, Justice, Finance and Charity. Pedro Gálvez went on to exercise the latter, while the former was held by Manuel Toribio Ureta (November 7, 1854). Gálvez became Minister of Justice, Worship and Charity, a position he held from February 1 to August 25, 1855.

In 1855 he was elected deputy for Cajamarca, and went on to join the National Convention or Constituent Congress, which gave the Liberal Constitution of 1856. He was part of the commission that created the Council of Ministers of Peru.

In 1856, the government of Castilla sent him as plenipotentiary minister to Central America, (Note: Accredited to Guatemala, Costa Rica, El Salvador, Honduras, and Nicaragua.) with the mission of managing the adherence of the countries of that region to the Continental Treaty sponsored by Peru, to unite for a joint defense against possible foreign interventions. Having achieved this purpose, he went to New Granada and then to Venezuela, to carry out other efforts.

He was accredited as plenipotentiary minister in Spain, where he was not received, then passing with the same investiture to the court of Napoleon III in Paris (1860).

== Later life ==
He returned to Peru, already in the final days of the government of Castilla. According to historian Jorge Basadre, he returned "cured of the liberal dalliances of his youth." He was appointed Minister of Finance and Commerce, a position he held from July 25 to October 8, 1862.

Again he was sent to France as plenipotentiary minister (1862–1864) and when he returned he was appointed dean of the Faculty of Jurisprudence of the University of San Marcos (1866–1868).

In 1868 he was elected senator for Cajamarca. When the government of Colonel José Balta was inaugurated, he joined the ministerial cabinet, occupying the portfolio of Government and the presidency of the Council of Ministers. But he resigned on April 13 of the following year, without mentioning any cause in the respective office; It was said then that it was due to a discrepancy that he had with the president.

Successively he went on to exercise diplomatic representation before the United States and various European governments, until his death in France, in 1872.

== Bibliography ==
- Basadre Grohmann, Jorge Alfredo (2005). Historia de la República del Perú. Peru. ISBN 978-612-306-353-5.
- Gálvez Montero, José Francisco; García Vega, Enrique Silvestre (2016). Historia de la Presidencia del Consejo de Ministros Tomo I (1820-1956). Peru. ISBN 978-87-93429-87-1.
- Vargas Ugarte, Rubén (1984). Historia General del Perú. Peru.
