= José Gálvez Egúsquiza =

Peruvian war hero

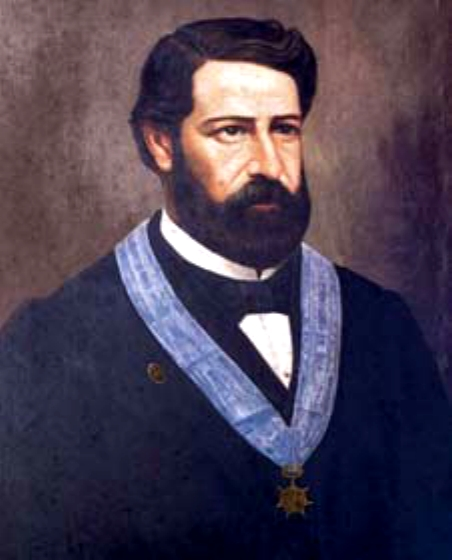

Minister of War and Navy
- In office November 26, 1865 – May 2, 1866
- President: Mariano Ignacio Prado
- Preceded by: José Balta
- Succeeded by: Pedro Bustamante

President of the National Convention (Congress of Peru)
- In office 1856–1856
- Preceded by: Miguel de San Román
- Succeeded by: Manuel Toribio Ureta
- In office 1857–1857
- Preceded by: Francisco Quirós
- Succeeded by: Convention closed

Constituent Deputy for Pasco (Junín)
- In office July 14, 1855 – November 2, 1857

Personal details
- Born: March 17, 1819 Cajamarca
- Died: May 2, 1866 (aged 47) Callao
- Parent(s): José Gálvez Paz; María Micaela de Egúsquiza
- Education: National University of San Marcos

Military service
- Allegiance: Peru
- Branch/service: Peruvian Army
- Years of service: 1854–1855, 1860, 1866
- Rank: Colonel
- Battles/wars: Liberal Revolution of 1854; 1860 Coup d'état attempt Peruvian Civil War of 1865; Chincha Islands War: Battle of Callao †

José Gabriel Gálvez Egúsquiza (Cajamarca, March 17, 1819 - Callao, May 2, 1866) was a Peruvian lawyer, professor and liberal politician. During the presidential government of Mariano Ignacio Prado he was Secretary—i.e. Minister—of War and Navy (1865). He was killed in action during the Battle of Callao, where he died fighting the Spanish squadron, thus becoming a symbol of the independence of America.

Chilean historian Benjamín Vicuña Mackenna, who met him in person, described him as "a man of modest figure, small of body, dark, pale, with a carefully combed head, careful in his suit and extremely soft and attractive manners. But under that cold and sweet appearance he hid a big heart and a vast and developed intelligence."

== Biography ==
His parents were Colonel José Manuel Gálvez Paz from Lima and María Micaela Egúsquiza y Aristizábal. He was the eldest of his brothers, who included Pedro Gálvez Egúsquiza and Manuel María Gálvez Egúsquiza. His first studies were made at the Cajamarca Central College of Sciences and Arts, run by the Presbyter Juan Pío Burga. After completing his studies, he helped his parents for some time in the work of their Catudén Hacienda.

In 1842 he moved to Lima, enrolling in the San Carlos convictorio, whose rector was clergyman Bartolomé Herrera. He graduated with a bachelor's degree in Sacred Canons in 1843 and graduated as a lawyer in 1845. For five years he practiced his profession in the area of Cerro de Pasco and Tarma, in the central sierra of Peru.

In 1850 he returned to Lima, and joined the Nuestra Señora de Guadalupe National College as a professor of Moral Philosophy, Psychology, Logic, and Theodicy. In 1852 he was appointed director of the same, replacing his brother Pedro Gálvez and he printed a marked liberal tendency in the studies, contrasting with the conservative orientation followed in the Carolina convictorio.

He left teaching to join the revolution started by General Ramón Castilla, in Arequipa, and helped to decide the abolition of the indigenous tax and the emancipation of slaves (1854), for which he had advocated theoretically in his teaching. After the victorious battle of La Palma (January 5, 1855), he was appointed rector of the Convictorio de San Carlos, where he strove to counteract the influence of Herrera.

Later he was elected deputy for the province of Pasco, becoming a member of the National Convention of 1855, summoned to give a new Constitution, replacing the one of 1839. When said Convention was installed on July 13, 1855, Gálvez was elected as Secretary, being re-elected in the successive elections of September 1, October 1 and November 1, holding office until the 30th of this month. On February 1, 1856, he was elected President, a position he held until the 28th of the aforementioned month, being reelected up to two more times. After arduous debates, the conventional ones gave the Liberal Constitution of 1856. Gálvez was also part of the Penal Code Coding Commission in 1857.

In 1857 Castilla dissolved the National Convention, an attitude that turned Gálvez into a staunch opponent, collaborating in the newspaper El Constitucional (April 3 to August 1, 1858). Castilla convened an ordinary Congress and had a new Constitution discussed in it, which was the moderate one of 1860. To prevent this new political charter from prevailing, Gálvez was part, together with Ricardo Palma and other liberals and officers, of a conspiracy to, according to the official version, victimize—i.e. kill—Castilla, storming his house on the Calle de las Divorciadas (November 23, 1860). The attempt failed, he had to take refuge in the Chilean legation in Lima and go into exile, heading to Europe.

On December 14, 1860, he left Callao with one of his minor children, bound for Panama, traveling to Paris and then to Geneva. She returned to Peru on November 2, 1862 and devoted herself to law. The following year she obtained a doctorate in Jurisprudence at the National University of San Marcos, with a thesis on the autonomous nature of scientific institutions with respect to the State.

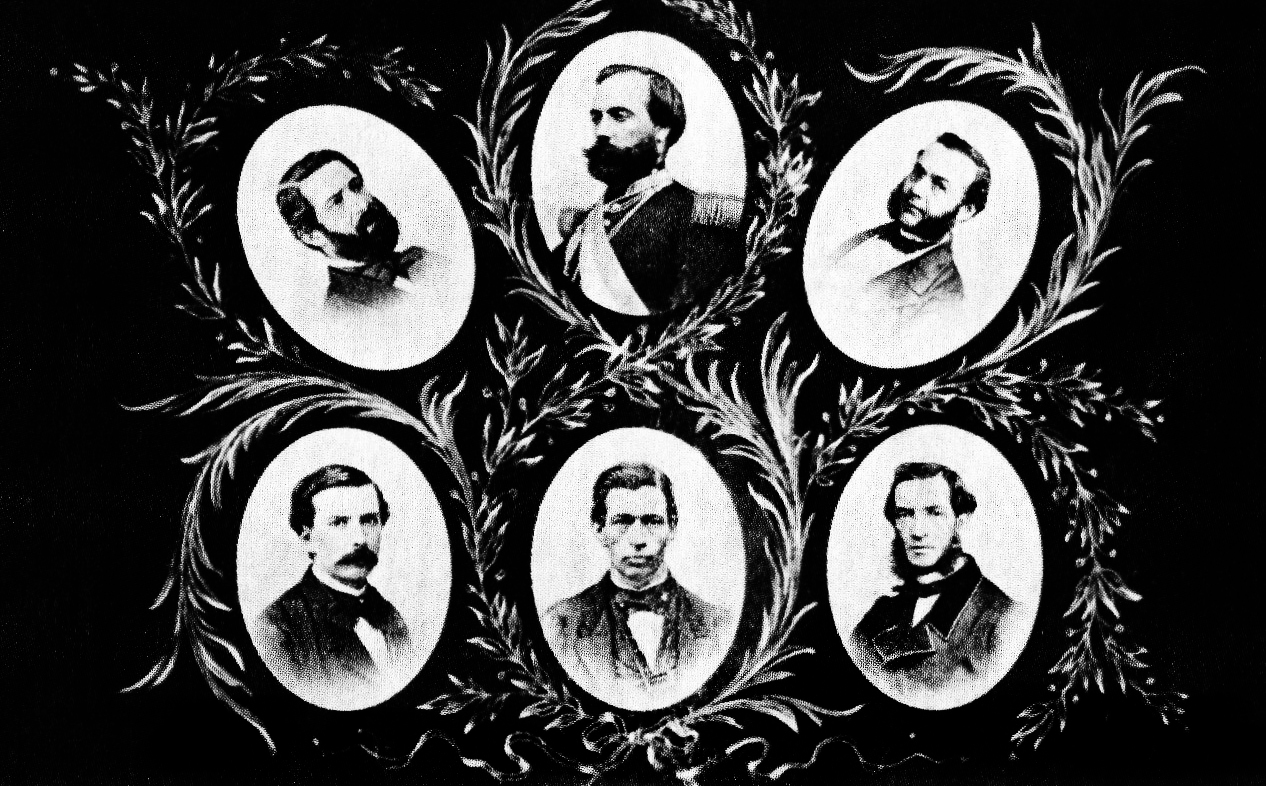
Mariano Ignacio Prado and his "Cabinet of Talents": José Gálvez, José María Químper, Manuel Pardo, José Simeón Tejeda and Toribio Pacheco y Rivero.

In 1865 he was elected dean of the Lima Bar Association and from that inauguration he criticized the passive attitude of President Juan Antonio Pezet in the face of the aggression of the Spanish Pacific Squad, for which reason he was again exiled to Chile. He returned to Peru and joined the revolution in Chincha led by Colonel Mariano Ignacio Prado, whom he requested to be allowed to fight. His application was accepted and he was awarded the rank of colonel. After the triumph of the revolution and the establishment of the Prado dictatorship, he was appointed Secretary (Minister) of War and Navy, integrating the famous Cabinet of Talents, of which he was leader (1865).

When, in April 1866, he found out about the manifesto made from the armoured frigate Numancia by Admiral Casto Méndez Núñez, commander of the Spanish Squad, threatening to bombard Callao within four days. Gálvez assumed the direction of the defense of the port and He built a series of batteries, located to the north and south, placing the weak and few warships in the center. In the northern defense was the Junín tower, the Ayacucho fort and the famous cannon of the town; On the southern batteries, the Santa Rosa fort, the Merced tower, which was revolving and armored, and the Zepita battery, which faced the Mar Brava.

On May 2, 1866, in the early hours of the fighting, one of the Blakely cannons at Fort Santa Rosa was disabled. A bomb from the Spanish frigate Almansa entered through one of the doors and fell into some gunpowder warehouses, causing an immense explosion that destroyed the tower of La Merced, where Gálvez was, along with some officers and soldiers.

The following day, the Peruvian Government issued a Decree ordering that Gálvez be considered "First Chief" in the Plaza Artillery Battalion. And when his name was read in the act of review, the commander replied: "He died heroically in the Defense of the Homeland and in Honor of America." Gálvez was buried in a mausoleum at the Presbítero Maestro Cemetery.

== Legacy ==
His status as a war hero in Peru is comparable to that of Miguel Grau and Francisco Bolognesi, both dead during the later War of the Pacific. His influence against conservatism and towards liberal democracy in the Conservatorio has been noted by promoters of said ideas in the years following his death.

A victory column was inaugurated in the former Ovalo de la Reina, in front of the Callao gate of the old wall of Lima. Originally, the design was to have the bust of Gálvez at its top, but later it was agreed to replace it with the statue of Victory, since it was considered that the monument should pay homage to all the defenders of Callao and not just to a particular individual.

== Family ==
On September 7, 1846, he married Ángela Moreno y Maíz in Tarma, daughter of sergeant major José Moreno y Mantilla and María del Carmen Maíz, who belonged to a wealthy family dedicated to mining businesses in the Iglesia del Milagro Church in Lima. Among their seven children were:

- María Gálvez Moreno, who married Peruvian Army Colonel Samuel Palacios Mendiburu in 1882.
- Angélica Gálvez Moreno, who married Manuel Bernardo Sayán Palacios on August 4, 1892.
- Justiniano Aurelio Gálvez Moreno, who married Amalia Barrenechea de la Fuente, daughter of the jurist and diplomat José Antonio Barrenechea y Morales, who were parents of the politician José Gálvez Barrenechea.
- José Gálvez Moreno, politician, sailor and Peruvian war hero of the War of the Pacific. He married Enriqueta Evens y Evens.
- Luis Augusto Gálvez Moreno
- Gerardo Wencelao Gálvez Moreno
- Carlos Enrique Gabriel Gálvez Moreno

== See also ==
- Pedro Gálvez Egúsquiza
- Manuel María Gálvez Egúsquiza

== Bibliography ==
- Basadre Grohmann, Jorge Alfredo (1939). Historia de la República del Perú. Peru. ISBN 978-612-306-353-5.
