= José Gálvez =

José Gálvez may refer to:

== People ==
- José Galvez (b. 1949), American photojournalist, part of the team that produced Latinos (newspaper series)
- José de Gálvez, 1st Marquess of Sonora (1720–1787), Spanish lawyer and inspector general of New Spain
- José Gálvez Barrenechea (1885–1957), Peruvian poet, writer, journalist, university professor, and politician
- José Gálvez Egúsquiza (1819–1866), Peruvian lawyer, professor, and politician
- José Gálvez Moreno (1850–1894), Peruvian naval officer and politician

== Other ==
- José Gálvez District, a district of the province of Celendín in Peru
- José Gálvez FBC, a football (soccer) club based in Chimbote, Ancash, Peru
