= Pedro Bustamante =

Peruvian general (1825–1885)

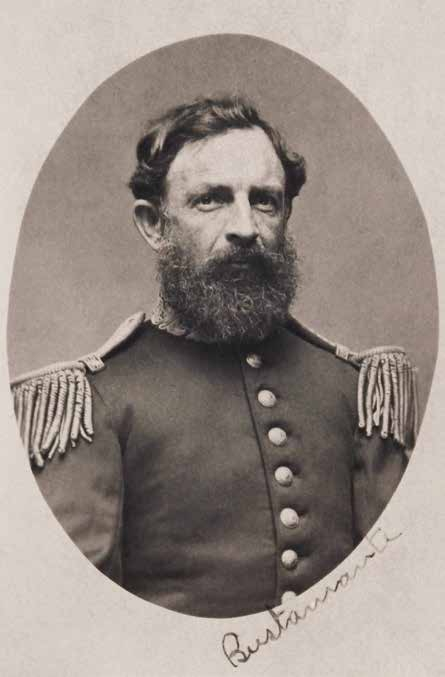
- Born: January 25, 1825; Arequipa, Department of Arequipa, Peru
- Died: July 16, 1885 (aged 60); Santa Rosa de Ocopa, Junín, Peru
- Military career
- Allegiance: Peru
- Branch: Peruvian Army
- Service years: 1839 – 1885
- Rank: Brigadier General
- Conflicts: Peruvian-Bolivian War: Battle of Ingavi (POW); Peruvian Civil War of 1856–1858: Siege of Arequipa; Chincha Islands War: Battle of Callao; War of the Pacific: Tarapacá campaign; Battle of San Francisco; Peruvian Civil War of 1884–1885: Battle of Masma (DOW)

Pedro Bustamante y García (1825-1885) was a Peruvian Brigadier General of the War of the Pacific. He served as the Minister of War and Navy throughout various presidencies during the 1860s and 1870s. He was also known as the main commander during the Siege of Arequipa where he defeated the Conservative forces of Manuel Ignacio de Vivanco.

== Early Military Career ==
Pedro was the son of Pascual Bustamante Jiménez and María Josefa García Bustamante. Pedro was still a teenager when in 1839 he joined the Peruvian Army as a cadet. He participated in the Peruvian-Bolivian War and was taken prisoner in the Battle of Ingavi (1841). He was released at the end of that year at the request of Colonel Manuel Ignacio de Vivanco and later went to Tacna. By 1850, he was promoted to lieutenant colonel.

In 1852, he was assigned to Cuzco as a military judge of First Instance and in the following year, he went to Tacna as a commander near border with Bolivia, when escalations between the two countries were nearly at the brink of a second war.

In 1854, Bustamante joined the liberal revolution led by General Ramón Castilla in Arequipa, against the government of General José Rufino Echenique. During that series of events, he was promoted to colonel and appointed commanding general of Tacna. After the revolution succeeded and established the second government of Castilla, he supported Castilla against General Manuel Ignacio de Vivanco's revolution, which led to the bloody Peruvian Civil War of 1856–1858. He had an outstanding performance during the Siege of Arequipa which earned him his promotion to brigadier general.

== Chincha Islands War and Political Career ==
He was successively named prefect of Moquegua in 1858 and Arequipa in 1860. He then went to Lima, where he attended various government missions. In 1865, he joined the national revolution led by Colonel Mariano Ignacio Prado against the government of General Juan Antonio Pezet, as a result of the problem caused by the arrogant presence of the Spanish Squadron on the Peruvian coast during the Chincha Islands War. He was sent to Chile on a mission to obtain weapons and upon his return he was appointed Inspector General of the Army.

He participated in the Battle of Callao on May 2, 1866 and succeeded José Gálvez Egúsquiza, in the position of Secretary or Minister of War from 1866 to 1867, after the latter's death at the battle. He remained in this position during the government of Manuel Pardo and the second presidency of Mariano Ignacio Prado and participated in the repression of Nicolás de Piérola's coup attempts and by 1874, he was the first mayor of the Barranco District.

== War of the Pacific and Death ==
At the outbreak of the War of the Pacific, he was appointed commanding general of the First Reserve Division (1879) and commanding general of the Southern Division (1880). He commanded one of the allied army divisions during the Battle of San Francisco, after which he withdrew to Arica. He also participated in the Battle of Tarapacá, commanding a division during the battle. After a stay in Lima, he went on to Arequipa, where he remained stationed until the signing of the Treaty of Ancón.

With the Chileans withdrawn from Peru, he appeared before General Andrés Avelino Cáceres in Huancayo, to give him his support in his fight against the regime of General Miguel Iglesias during the Peruvian Civil War of 1884–1885. He participated in the Battle of Masma on July 4, 1885, where he was mortally wounded. He was appointed general commander of the constitutional army before dying from his wounds on July 16, 1885.

== Legacy ==
Currently, in the District of Barranco there is a square that bears his name behind the Colegio San Luis.
