= Manuel Menéndez =

President of Peru variously in the 1840s

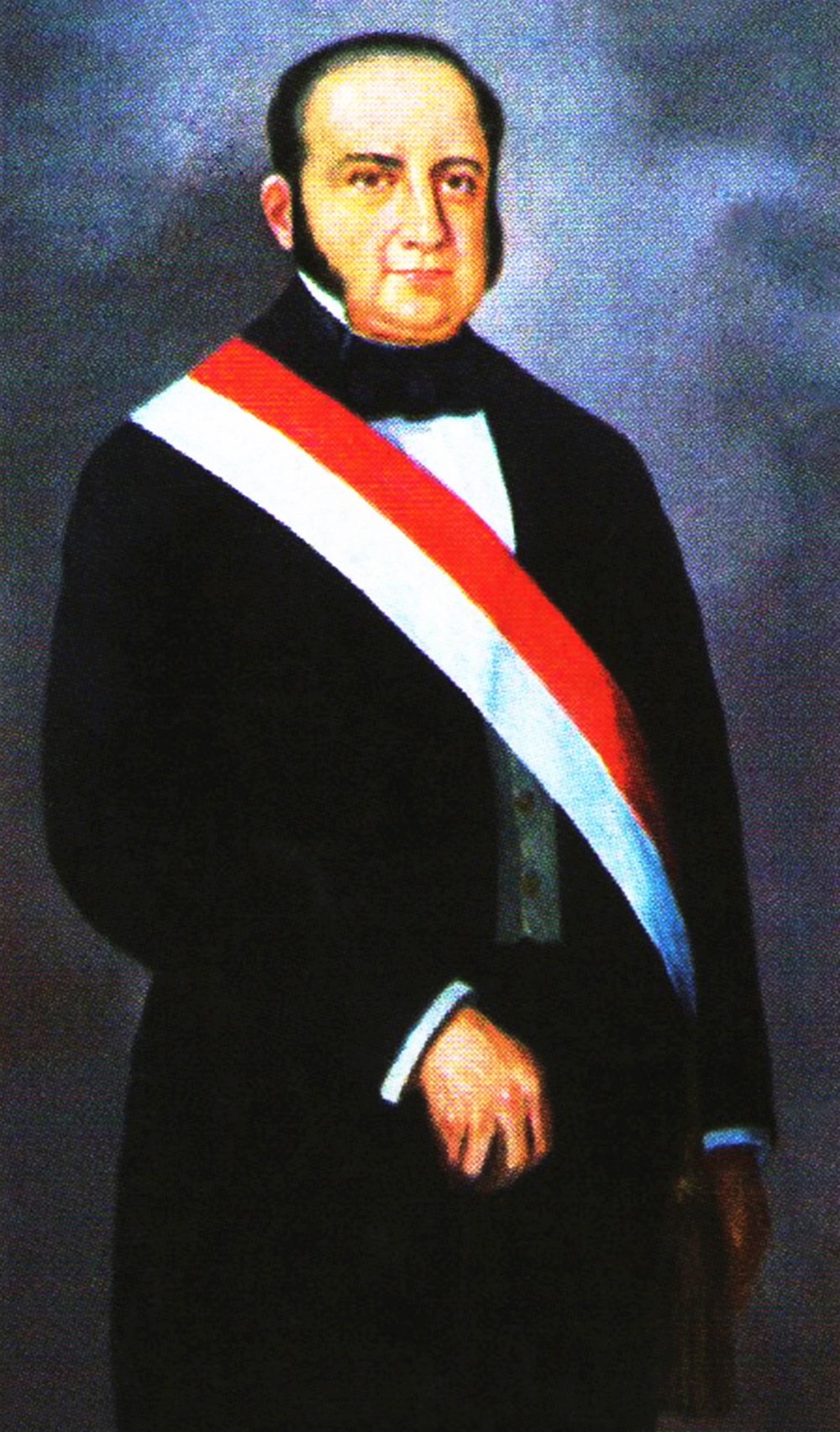

Interim president of Peru
- In office 18 November 1841 – 16 August 1842
- Preceded by: Agustín Gamarra
- Succeeded by: Juan Crisóstomo Torrico
- In office 7 October 1844 – 20 April 1845
- Preceded by: Manuel Ignacio de Vivanco
- Succeeded by: Ramón Castilla

Personal details
- Born: 31 May 1793 Lima, Peru
- Died: 2 May 1847 (aged 53) Lima, Peru

Manuel Menéndez Gorozabel (1793 – May 2, 1847) was a Peruvian politician who served as interim President of Peru from 1841 to 1842, and again from 1844 to 1845.

He was ousted from office in a 1842 military coup carried out by General Juan Crisostomo Torrico. He was restored to office in the Constitutional Revolution of 1843-1844.

== See also ==
- List of presidents of Peru

Political offices
Preceded by Agustín Gamarra	Interim President of Peru; 1841–1842	Succeeded by Juan Crisóstomo Torrico
Preceded by Domingo Elías	Interim President of Peru; 1844	Succeeded by Justo Figuerola
Preceded by Justo Figuerola	Interim President of Peru; 1844–1845	Succeeded by José Rufino Echenique
