= Battle of La Palma =

Date	5 January 1855
Location	Miraflores, Lima, Peru
Result	Revolutionary victory

Belligerents
(Peru) Constitutional government	(Peru) Liberating Army

Commanders and leaders
(Peru) José Rufino Echenique	(Peru) Ramón Castilla

Strength
5,000+ men	3,500–6,000+ men

Casualties and losses
500 killed	1,000 killed

On January 5, 1855, during the Liberal Revolution of 1854 in Peru, at the La Palma hacienda, Ramón Castilla's troops defeated those of Echenique, who had to be sheltered in the house of the British charge d'affaires, Sullivan. The Government Palace, the President's house and his wife's quinta were looted, as well as that of his relatives and his closest collaborators. Echenique then went into exile.
