= José Gálvez Moreno =

Peruvian sailor and politician

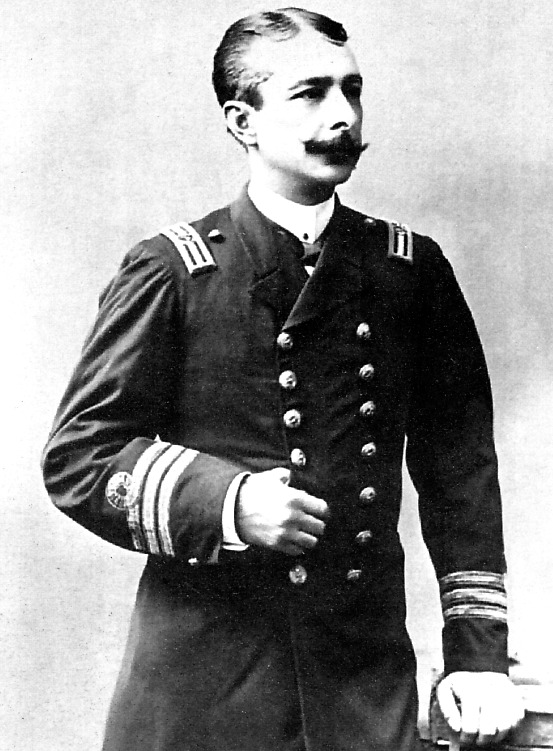

Deputy for Hualgayoc (Cajamarca)
- In office July 28, 1886 – October 25, 1889

Senator of Cuzco
- In office April 28, 1883 – June 20, 1883

Personal details
- Born: February 17, 1850 Tarma, Peru
- Died: April 29, 1894 (aged 44) Lima, Peru
- Spouse: Enriqueta Evens Evens
- Children: 5
- Parent(s): José Gálvez Egúsquiza; Ángela Moreno y Maíz

Military service
- Allegiance: Peru; United Kingdom
- Branch/service: Peruvian Navy; Royal Navy
- Years of service: 1865–1885
- Rank: Frigate captain
- Battles/wars: Chincha Islands War: Battle of Abtao; War of the Pacific: Defense of Callao (WIA); Breña campaign

José Miguel Gálvez Moreno (Tarma, February 17, 1850 — Lima, April 29, 1894), was a Peruvian sailor and politician considered a war hero in Peru for his actions during the War of the Pacific. He was a son of José Gálvez Egúsquiza, who died in the Battle of Callao during the Chincha Islands War, also considered a war hero in Peru.

== Biography ==
He was the son of José Gálvez Egúsquiza and Ángela Moreno y Maíz. After studying at the College of Our Lady of Guadalupe, he entered the Naval Academy and graduated as a midshipman in 1865. He served on the América frigate and then on the Apurímac frigate, aboard which he fought in the battle of Abtao, being promoted to alférez de fragata in April 1866.

After the combat on May 2, he attended the examination of the remains of his father, managing to identify them. Shortly thereafter he left the service and went on to study abroad. He rejoined in October 1870 and completed his studies at the Naval Academy. In June 1871 he went on to serve on the Union corvette. In October 1872 he traveled to England as a member of the commission in charge of supervising the construction of the Chanchamayo and Pilcomayo gunboats. Due to the crisis that the Peruvian Navy was going through at that time, Gálvez offered his services to the British Navy and was accepted. He took part in numerous war actions, in which he distinguished himself.

== War of the Pacific ==
But he requested his discharge at the beginning of the War of the Pacific and returned to Peru, rejoining the Peruvian Navy. He was part of the instructor Atahualpa's crew in which he stood out in the defense of the port of Callao.

When President Mariano Ignacio Prado traveled aboard the Paita in December 1879 bound for the United States and Europe, to manage the remittance of weapons, José Gálvez Moreno accompanied him, together with Jorge Tezanos Pinto and Celso Zuleta. Upon their arrival in New York City, however, they learned that the president had been deposed by the revolution of Nicolás de Piérola. Gálvez stayed in the United States for two months on duty, and upon returning to Peru he embarked again on the Atahualpa, by superior order of March 14, 1880, under the orders of Commander Juan José Raygada.

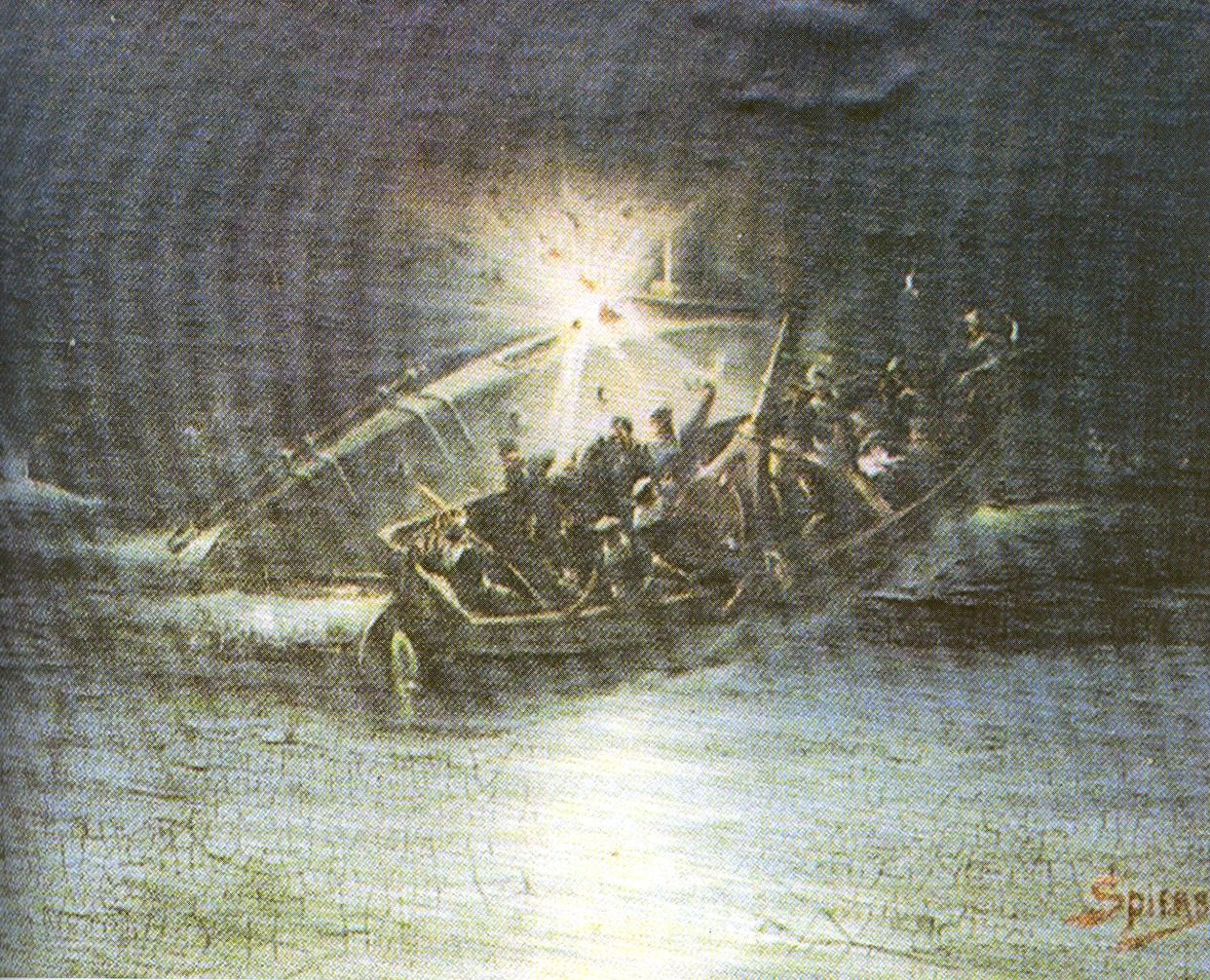
Combat of May 25, 1880, between the Chilean torpedo boat Janequeo and the Peruvian launch Independencia, commanded by José Gálvez.

When the Chilean squadron appeared in Callao, from April 10, 1880, the port was blocked, the square was cut off in its communications by sea, and this part of the coast was subjected to enemy surveillance. When the bombardments began on April 22, José Gálvez actively participated in the defense. On the night of May 24, he was assigned to patrol duty in the Callao roadstead, aboard the Independencia launch. After three hours of patrolling, when he was returning to his base, at two in the morning on the 25th, he engaged in combat with the Chilean boats Guacolda and Janequeo. Under these circumstances, the Independencia cannon broke down and the machine gun broke down. The Independence carried a 100-pound gunpowder torpedo. In an instant, the medical practitioner Manuel S. Ugarte (Second in Command), taking advantage of the agility and strength that the sport had given him, loaded and threw the device onto the deck of the enemy vessel, but not before having lit it after cutting the fuse with the help of Corporal Emilio San Martín; then Gálvez, according to what was simultaneously agreed, fired on the torpedo, getting it to explode after the second shot. As a result, the Janequeo sank and the Independencia capsized. Ugarte and San Martín (closer to the explosion) died instantly, while the explosion hit Gálvez in the air and pushed him into the sea, being rescued by the sailor Pedro Villanueva, who kept him afloat. Shortly after the other Chilean boat arrived, the Guacolda, which picked up the survivors.

Gálvez was badly wounded and was taken to the deck of the battleship Blanco Encalada. He had his face and hands burned, hairless, his nose and clavicle broken, and a piece of iron pierced through his arm. He also suffered from temporary blindness. Knowing that it was the son of the hero of May 2—a sentiment also shared by the Chileans—the Chileans did not want him to die on board the flagship of the Chilean Navy, and they returned him to Callao, exchanging him for a Chilean prisoner.

Gálvez recovered after long and careful treatment and by Supreme Decree of May 28, 1880, signed by Nicolás de Piérola, he was awarded the second class Steel Cross. He continued to fight against Chile together with General Andrés Avelino Cáceres in the Breña campaign, forming part of the famous "ayudantina", the group of young officers who acted as assistants to the "Brujo de los Andes". In 1882 he was promoted to Lieutenant Commander.

== Later life and death ==
He was elected senator for the department of Cuzco in the congress held in Arequipa in 1883 by President Lizardo Montero after the Peruvian defeat in the war with Chile.

After the war, Gálvez continued to act in the Peruvian Navy, reaching the class of frigate captain in 1885. He was again under the orders of Cáceres, this time during the constitutional campaign of 1885 against Miguel Iglesias, and stood out in another feat: leading a handful of brave young men, he seized a locomotive and ten wagons loaded with weapons, ammunition and food, in the village of Chicla (November 25, 1885). In said captured transport, Cáceres marched with his troops to Lima and overthrew Iglesias.

Gálvez also held the Sub-prefecture and Police Administration of Lima and was elected deputy for Hualgayoc Province.

He committed suicide in one of the Club de la Unión rooms, leaving behind a widow (Enriqueta Evens Evens, a British national) and five children.
