= Peruvian Civil War of 1856–1858 =

Peruvian Civil War (1856-1858) Arequipa Revolution (1856–1858)
- Part of Peruvian civil wars and Guano Era
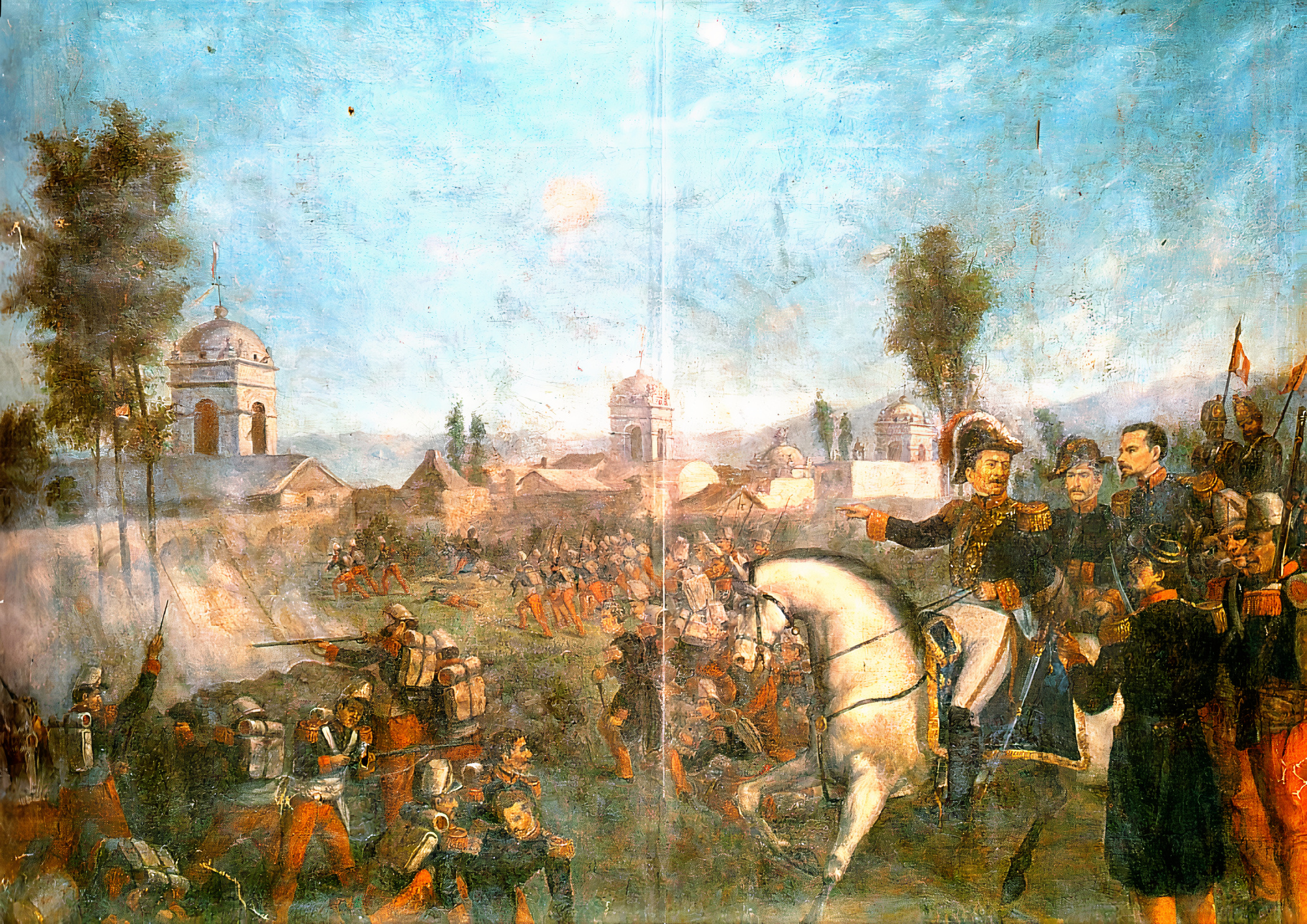
- Capture of Arequipa
Date	October 31, 1856–April 1, 1858
Location	Peruvian coast
Result	Pragmatic victory; Arequipa is downgraded to a province; The liberal constitution of 1854 was repealed following the establishment of the pragmatic constitution of 1860; Continue the American–Peruvian incident until December 20, 1860; The First Ecuadorian–Peruvian War begins

Belligerents
Pragmatic Army	Conservative Army; Supported by: Chile; United States

Commanders and leaders
Ramón Castilla; Miguel de San Román	Manuel de Vivanco (surrendered); Miguel Grau (surrendered)

Strength
Peruvian Army; 10,000-11,000 troops three pieces of artillery Peruvian Navy; 1 steamer	Vivanquista Army; 8,000-10,000 troops Vivanquista Navy; 4 steamers

Casualties and losses
5,000–6,000 killed and wounded	7,000 killed and wounded 1,000–3,000 captured 3 steamers captured 1 steamer destroyed
- 3,000 civilians killed

The Peruvian Civil War of 1856–1858, also known as the Arequipa Revolution of 1856, was one of the largest and most violent in Peru. It was the third internal conflict in 19th century Peru (after the Peruvian Civil War of 1834 and Peruvian Civil War of 1843–1844). It was fought between the Pragmatics (liberals and conservatives coalition, supporters of Ramón Castilla) and the Liberals (who opposed Castilla). It followed the Peruvian Liberal Revolution of 1854. 3,000 people were killed on both sides.

== Causes ==
The main cause was the enactment of the Constitution of 1856, enacted on October 19 of that year, by the national Convention (Congress) that had been established in the previous year. One of the new principles of the constitution was the suppression of the death penalty. The Constitution of 1856 introduced free education, specifically primary school education; it reduced the age to be a representative of the people to 28 years. Congress became strong and almost single-chambered, since there were no differences between deputies and senators.

The Grand Marshal Ramón Castilla, Provisional President of Peru at the time, was opposed to the Constitution because it very limited the authority of the President of the Republic. The Constitution re-established the Vice Presidents and created the Cabinet. Furthermore, it reduced the presidential term from six to four years. Despite this, Ramón Castilla signed the Constitution on October 18, 1856.

There was also great discontent in the country over the high stipends of the members of the National Convention, as well as the excessive expenditure on slave manumissions. According to the 1825 Census there were 15 thousand slaves in Peru, and 25 thousand had been manumitted. Another criticism was that the elections for the National Convention had been dominated by freedmen and illiterate people, while public servants from the previous regime were excluded. This is due to threats against the Catholic Church (La Compañía de Jesús was not allowed entry), and because Castilla himself had restored the Indigenous Tribute under the name of General Contribution in March 1855.

There were numerous individuals that were opposed to Castilla’s government, and proof of this are the uprisings in: Arequipa (July, 1855), Islay (March, 1856), Chincha (April 14, 1856), Nauta (June 30, 1856), Trujillo (August 15, 1856), Tacna (September 22, 1856), Ayacucho, Ancash, and other places. In Lima there was an uprising from General Fermín Del Castillo, which failed, and he was then forced into exile.

== The Uprising of Arequipa ==
On October 31, 1856 the conservative uprising in Arequipa began, with a popular movement headlined by Domingo Camino and Diego Masías y Llosa, who two years prior had supported the rebellion against Echenique. They invited Manuel Ignacio de Vivanco, who returned from exile in Chile, to lead the movement. Within a few days, 500 men were armed. The government sent the BAP Loa and the BAP Ucayali to Arica, where they unloaded 2 squadrons of men on horseback, and half of an infantry battalion. They took in political prisoners accused of conspiring in Arica, and imprisoned them in the Highlander and Caupolicán pontoons. They also brought the Grand Marshal Miguel de San Román to take command of the forces, and intimidate the surrender of Arequipa on November 16.

=== Siege of Arequipa ===
Siege of Arequipa
Date	June 1857 – March 1858
Location	Arequipa, Peru
Result	Decisive government victory: Arequipa is downgraded to a province

Belligerents
(Peru) Liberals	(Peru) Conservatives

Commanders and leaders
(Peru) Ramón Castilla (Peru) Miguel de San Román	(Peru) Manuel Ignacio de Vivanco

Strength
7,000 soldiers	1,800 soldiers 2,000 militiamen

Casualties and losses
2,000 killed and wounded	3,000 killed 800 captured

After eight months of siege and failed peace efforts promoted by the Chilean Minister Ramón Irarrázabal, the constitutional army of Ramón Castilla assaulted the city of Arequipa, which was the last redoubt of the revolutionary movement promoted by General Manuel Ignacio de Vivanco, after the seizure of the city and the subsequent subjugation of the rebel Apurímac frigate culminated the bloodiest civil war that Peru suffered in its entire republican history.

== The Uprising of the Marines ==
On November 16, the frigate Apurímac, anchored in Arica, saw the rebellion by two young pro-Vivanco officers. They were the Second Lieutenant Lizardo Montero and the Second Lieutenant Miguel Grau. They took advantage of the fact that the commander of the ship, Captain José María Salcedo, was ashore in the house of the English Consul. The first act of the rebel marines was to release the political prisoners held in the Caupolicán and Highlander in Arica.

The Apurímac marched north and rebelled on the Province of Islay at the Loa. The captain of the Port of Islay, Emilio Días Seminario, Grau’s half-brother, joined the rebel side. There it was San Román, with the Generals Diez Canseco and Lerzundi, plus 180 armed officers, retreating towards Tacna. But, on November 16 they encountered the rebel Colonel Broousset, who, with only 20 men on horseback and 15 infantry, dispersed them, and San Román fled to Puno.

Castilla declared the ships pirates so that any foreign squadron, (French or English) could attack them. A naval division was formed under the command of Captain Ignacio Mariátegui, consisting of the Tumbes and the Ucayali to recover the Apurímac. But, offshore the Tumbes rebelled with its commander, the Lieutenant Commander Federico Alzamora, and disembarked to the approaching forces that were under the command of Colonel Mariano Ignacio Prado in the Chincha Islands. Rear Admiral Domingo Valle Riestra was appointed General Commander of the Rebel Squadron, which had 78 officers, including five naval captains; it was a general uprising of the navy. Ricardo Palma was also appointed Accountant General of the Rebel Army. Since the frigate Amazonas was traveling to Hong Kong, the government of Castilla was left with only the steamer Ucayali.

The Apurímac and the Loa attacked Arica on November 27, as the government garrison, composed of 100 men, refused to provide them food. They took the port, and caused 18 deaths, but after supplying their provisions, they withdrew.

The rebel fleet took the Chincha Islands on December 28, where they also captured the steamer Izcuchaca. They began to sell guano, which financed the uprising, although the contracts that the government had with French, English, and American traders were not interrupted. The rebels sold guano to Valparaíso merchants, friends of Vivanco. The Convention declared this act as a theft of national property, and whoever traded with them to be criminals. In addition, this empowered the Executive to deal with the diplomats of Great Britain and France to give their assistance, if necessary, on the custody of the islands’ guano supply. With the money from the guano, the rebels bought weapons, and two steamers in Chile: the Volcán, which they called Arauco, and the Peytona, rechristened as the Lambayeque.

== Aftermath ==
Although Vivanco was defeated, his demands were eventually met. Castilla distanced himself from the more radical elements of the liberal party and surrounded himself with more moderate politicians, who gave another twist to Peruvian politics.

The department of Arequipa was downgraded to a province through two decrees expedited by Castilla on 12 and 14 March, 1858. On May 13 of the same year, however, he made a request to the Council of Ministers that the department (and its prefecture, superior court and administrative offices) be reestablished.

== See also ==
- Liberal Revolution of 1854

== Portrayals in fiction ==
- María Nieves y Bustamante. Jorge, el hijo del pueblo. Arequipa: Imprenta de la Bolsa, 1892.
- Matto de Turner, Clorinda. Índole. Lima: Tipo Litograrafía, 1891.
