= José Gálvez Paz =

Peruvian colonel

José Manuel Gálvez Paz
- Born: Manuel José González de Gálvez; 1792; Lima
- Died: June 12, 1849 (aged 56–57); Cajamarca
- Spouse: María Micaela Egúsquiza y Aristizábal (m. 1818)
- Children: José Gálvez Egúsquiza; Pedro Gálvez Egúsquiza; Manuel María Gálvez Egúsquiza
- Military career
- Rank: Lt. Colonel
- Conflicts: Spanish American wars of independence

José Manuel Gálvez Paz (born Manuel José González de Gálvez, Lima, 1792 – Cajamarca, June 12, 1849) was a Peruvian politician. He reached the rank of Lieutenant Colonel of Cavalry of San Miguel de Pallaques and was sub-prefect of the province of Cajamarca.

== Biography ==
He was born in Lima in 1792. His surname was originally "González de Gálvez", but he shortened it to Gálvez in 1823. He married María Micaela de Egúsquiza y Aristizábal, the daughter of Agustín José de Egúsquiza y Mansilla and María Apolinaria Aristizábal, in Cajamarca in March 2, 1818. Among his children, José and Pedro Gálvez Egúsquiza stand out, who had important political participation in Peru during the 19th century.

Representing the province of Cajamarca, he was one of the sixty-five deputies elected in 1825 by the Supreme Court and summoned to approve the 1826 Constitution of dictator Simón Bolívar. However, despite the fact that said congress was convened, it decided not to assume any type of powers and did not take office.

He died in Cajamarca on June 12, 1849.
