= Battle of Cerro Barón =

Date	6 June 1837
Location	Valparaísoو Chile
Result	Government victory

Commanders and leaders
Manuel Blanco Encalada	José Antonio Vidaurre

Strength
- 1440 - 1500

Casualties and losses
1650 infantry	185 chivalry

The Battle of Cerro Barón took place on 6 June 1837 on the hills in the neighborhood of the city of Valparaíso in Chile.

== Battle ==
This was a combat run by troops loyal to the government led by Manuel Blanco Encalada against rebellious Cazadores de Maipú regiment, commanded by its colonel José Antonio Vidaurre.

The Cazadores had just murdered Minister Diego Portales.Vidaurre fled through the Viña del Mar ravine when he warned of his imminent defeat. He was captured months later and publicly executed by court-martial.

== See also ==
- José Antonio Vidaurre
- Manuel Blanco Encalada
