= Miguel de San Román =

President of Peru from 1862 to 1863

Miguel de San Román y Meza
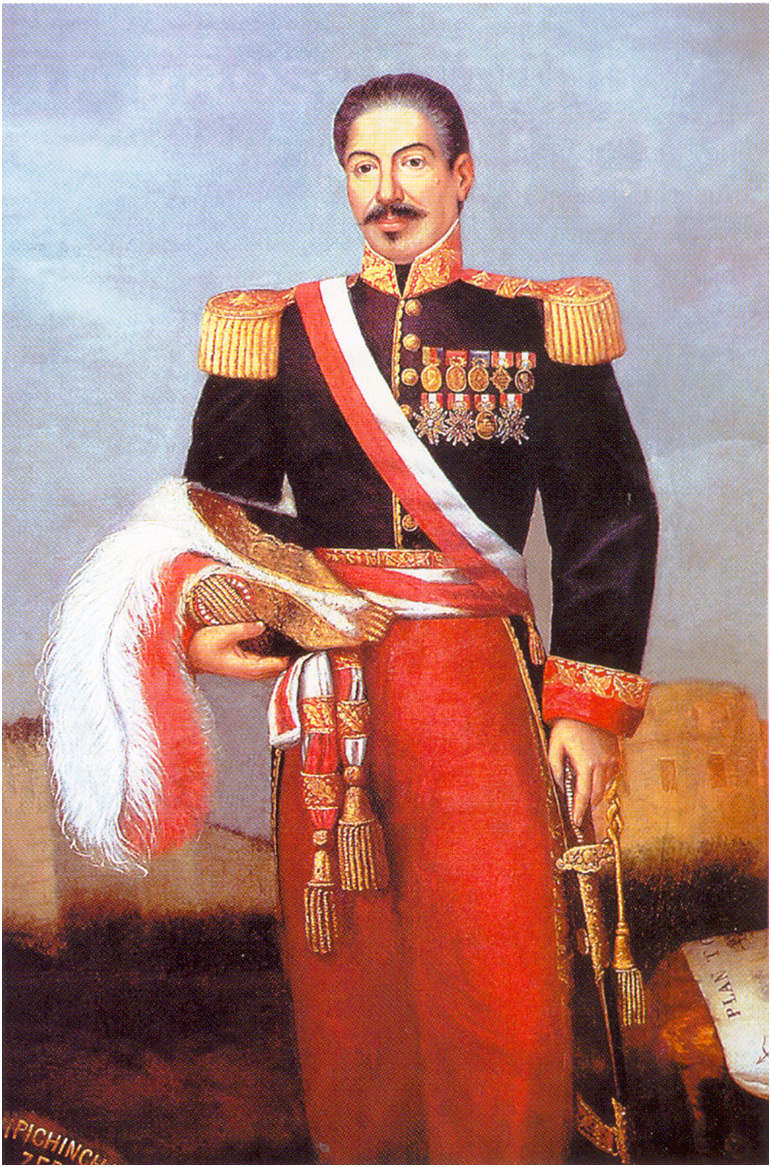

President of Peru
- In office October 24, 1862 – April 3, 1863
- Prime Minister: Juan Antonio Pezet
- Vice President: Juan Antonio Pezet; Pedro Diez Canseco
- Preceded by: Ramón Castilla
- Succeeded by: Ramón Castilla

3rd Prime Minister of Peru
- In office July 15, 1858 – October 1858
- President: Ramón Castilla
- Preceded by: José Maria Raygada y Gallo
- Succeeded by: José Maria Raygada y Gallo

Personal details
- Born: May 17, 1802 Puno, Viceroyalty of Peru, Spanish Empire
- Died: April 3, 1863 (aged 60) Lima, Peru
- Profession: Soldier

Miguel de San Román y Meza (May 17, 1802, Puno, Peru – April 3, 1863, Lima, Peru) served as President of Peru for a brief period between 1862 and 1863.

In 1822 he served under Simón Bolívar and participated in the Battle of Ayacucho. From there on, San Román participated in various battles during the first years of the Peruvian republican period. He supported Agustín Gamarra until his defeat in the battle of Ingavi.

Despite this defeat, San Román was awarded the grade of Gran Mariscal. He occupied the post of "President of the Council of State" between 1845 and 1849. He served as the President of the National convention from 1855 to 1856. In 1855 he was named Minister of War under Ramón Castilla, and later served as Prime Minister of Peru from July to October 1858. In 1862 he was elected as the President of Peru.

Miguel de San Román introduced the Peruvian Sol currency in 1863 and adopted the decimal system for standard weight and measures.

He died a couple of months after assuming power in the Lima district Chorrillos.

== See also ==
- List of prime ministers of Peru
- List of presidents of Peru

Political offices
Preceded by José María Raygada y Gallo	Prime Minister of Peru; 1858	Succeeded by José María Raygada y Gallo
Preceded by Luis Alberto Sánchez	President of Peru; 1862–1863	Succeeded by Juan Carlos Hurtado Miller
