= Liberal Revolution of 1854 =

Peruvian civil conflict

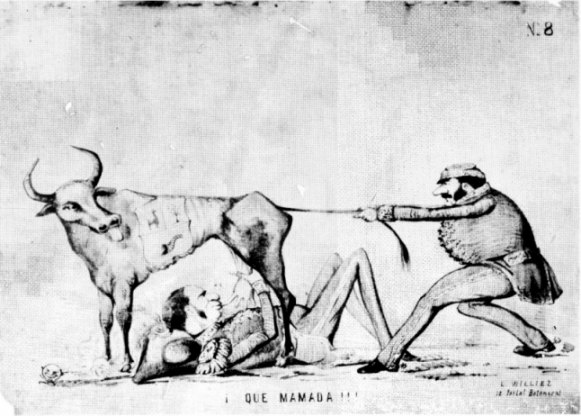
- Anti-Echenique political cartoon
Date	21 October 1853 – 7 January 1855
Location	Peru
Result	Revolutionary victory

Belligerents
(Peru) Constitutional government	(Peru) Revolutionary Junta of Arequipa

Commanders and leaders
(Peru) José Rufino Echenique	(Peru) Ramón Castilla (Peru) Domingo Elías (Peru) Fermín del Castillo

Strength
5,000+ men	Liberating Army: 3,500–6,000+ men

Casualties and losses
- 4,000 dead in total

The Liberal Revolution of 1854 (Spanish: Revolución Liberal de 1854), also known as the Arequipa Revolution of 1854 (Spanish: Revolución de Arequipa de 1854), was a popular insurrection that emerged in Peru during the government of José Rufino Echenique due to accusations of corruption. It was led by Domingo Elías, Fermín del Castillo and Ramón Castilla.

In the aftermath of the revolution, a new constitution was written.

== Background ==
At the end of 1853, Domingo Elías had accused President Echenique of being "too generous" in paying the amount of the Consolidation debt for damages to individuals for damages of the War of Independence.

Echenique then ordered the imprisonment of Elías and deported him. However, he then entered Tumbes from Ecuador, where he attempted a failed coup. Avoiding surveillance, he arrived in Ica and organized a group of militiamen to harass the government. Echenique commanded his troops and they fight in the surroundings of Cerro Saraja in a rather bloody battle on 7 January 1854, where about 150 supporters of Elías are killed. At the beginning of 1854, the Indians of Huaras joined the rebellion, demanding the abolition of the indigenous tribute.

== Conflict ==
The outbreaks of revolution began and in Arequipa, Castilla took over the insurrection. He arrived on 13 February to the acclamation of the people. Echenique sent his troops to the south, but Castilla defended the city with fewer men. At the end of March, Castilla moved to Cusco. On 14 April he received the announcement that the Revolutionary Junta of Arequipa has proclaimed him Provisional President. With a formed army he arrived in Andahuaylas on 8 June, and on the 23rd he met in Bombón with General Del Castillo's division. On 3 July he occupied Huamanga, escorted by the famous "Morochucos".

Despite the fact that the country now had two presidents, Castilla issued on 5 July the historic decree abolishing the indigenous tribute, which gave his revolution a social character.

Domingo Elías returned to the country, prompting the government to send troops against him and to attempt an unsuccessful defense of the plaza of Arica. On the other hand, Vivanco, since his exile in Chile, returned, but did not participate as he felt "marginalized" by Castilla. From Huamanga, the latter traced his final strategy.

Echenique advanced towards Jauja and thought to have attacked Castilla in Huancayo, but he could not defeat General Izcuchaca's troops in Huancavelica. So he occupied the Mantaro Valley, while Castilla campsed in a poor region and decides to go to the heights to threaten Lima and attempt force Echenique's return. His plan worked. On 3 December in Huancayo, Castilla issued another decree abolishing slavery.

On 5 January 1855, at the La Palma hacienda, Castilla's troops defeated those of Echenique, who had to be sheltered in the house of the British charge d'affaires, Sullivan. The Government Palace, the President's house and his wife's quinta were looted, as well as that of his relatives and his closest collaborators. Echenique then went into exile.

== Aftermath ==
With the liberal triumph, a provisional government was installed with General Ramón Castilla as President, whose ministerial cabinet included other liberals such as Pedro Gálvez Egúsquiza, Manuel Toribio Ureta and Domingo Elías. Following the pendulum trend of Peruvian politics, after a conservative government, a liberal one was given way, although Castilla, deep down, did not believe in liberalism.

Castilla called elections for the meeting of a Constituent Assembly or National Convention, whose mission would be to reform the conservative Constitution of 1839. For the first time elections were called with direct and universal suffrage: direct, since the Electoral Colleges would not be elected, but directly to the representatives of the new Congress; and universal, because all Peruvians would vote without any limitation, regardless of being illiterate or having no fortune.

Once the elections were held and the representatives of the National Convention were elected, it was installed on 14 July 1855. Its first measure was the ratification of Castilla as Provisional President; then he issued a Provisional Statute, promulgated on 27 July of that same year. In said Statute, which was to govern while the new Constitution was being discussed, the attributions of the Head of State were established and the individual and national guarantees were indicated.

== See also ==
- Peruvian Civil War of 1856–1858
