= Ramón Castilla =

President of Peru variously in the 1800s

Ramón Castilla y Marquesado
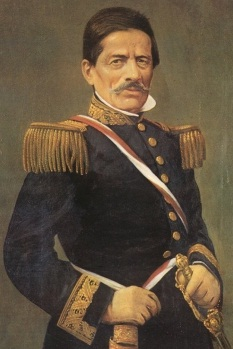

President of Peru
- In office 20 April 1845 – 20 April 1851
- Preceded by: Manuel Menéndez
- Succeeded by: José Rufino Echenique
- In office 5 January 1855 – 24 October 1862
- Prime Minister: Juan Manuel del Mar Bernedo; José María Raygada y Gallo; Miguel de San Román
- Vice President: Juan Manuel del Mar
- Preceded by: José Rufino Echenique
- Succeeded by: Miguel de San Román

President of the Supreme Provisory Junta
- In office 17 February – 10 August 1844
- Preceded by: Domingo Nieto
- Succeeded by: Justo Figuerola

Interim President of Peru
- In office 3 April – 9 April 1863
- Prime Minister: Juan Antonio Pezet
- Vice President: Juan Antonio Pezet; Pedro Diez Canseco
- Preceded by: Miguel de San Román
- Succeeded by: Pedro Diez Canseco

Personal details
- Born: 31 August 1797 Tarapacá, Arequipa, Peru
- Died: 30 May 1867 (aged 69) Tiliviche, Tarapacá, Peru
- Spouse: Francisca Diez-Canseco
- Profession: Soldier (Field marshal)

Ramón Castilla y Marquesado (Spanish pronunciation: [raˈmoŋ kasˈtiʝa]; 31 August 1797 – 30 May 1867) was a Peruvian caudillo who served twice as President of Peru, first in 1845–1851, and then in 1855–1862. He also led a military junta in 1844, and was de facto interim president for a couple of days in April 1863. His earliest prominent appearance in Peruvian history began with his participation in a commanding role of the army of the Libertadores that helped Peru become an independent nation. Later, he led the country when the economy boomed due to the exploitation of guano deposits. Castilla's governments are remembered for having abolished slavery and modernized the state.

He began his military career in the royalist army, participating in the Battle of Chacabuco. Taken prisoner after the battle, he was taken to Buenos Aires where he obtained permission to leave the country and returned to Peru. Reinstated in the Royal Army of Peru, he joined the independence cause in early 1822. He organized and served in the cavalry of the Peruvian Legion, distinguishing himself at the Battle of Ayacucho. He continued his military and political career, holding high public offices such as sub-prefect of his native Tarapacá and prefect of Puno during the administrations of Agustín Gamarra and Luis José de Orbegoso.

His first constitutional government was notable for the country's institutional stability after a long period of anarchy, the organization of the Peruvian state, and the economic boom fueled by revenues from the guano deposits. He led the liberal revolution of 1854 and decreed the abolition of the indigenous tribute and the end of slavery.

== Early life ==
Castilla was born in Tarapacá (then part of the Viceroyalty of Peru), the second son of Pedro Castilla, of Spanish-Argentine origin, and Juana Marquezado de Romero, who was of part Aymara descent. During his childhood, he helped his father as a woodcutter, and made trips to the desert to collect dry carob tree branches.

In 1807 he traveled to Lima at the age of 10 to study with his brother and later continued his education in Concepción, Chile, also helping his brother with his business. In 1817 he enrolled in the Spanish colonial army during the Peruvian War of Independence, fighting against the independence forces sent by Argentine general José de San Martín.

== Military career ==
=== Spanish American Wars of Independence ===
In 1812, Castilla enlisted, along with his brother Leandro, in the Royal Army of Peru. He actively participated in the campaigns against the Chilean War of Independence. After the defeat of the insurgents, he received his commission as a full cadet in the Dragoons of the Frontier cavalry regiment in Santiago (1816). At the age of twenty, as an escort officer to Brigadier Francisco Marcó del Pont in the Spanish army, he suffered the defeat at the Battle of Chacabuco on 12 February 1817, and was forced to retreat, being captured at the Las Tablas hacienda, near El Quisco.

Castilla became a prisoner of war, but managed to escape and returned to Peru in 1821, deserting the Spanish Army and offering his services to José de San Martín, who enrolled him in the Patriot Army with the rank of lieutenant (a rank he had held with the Spanish Army). When San Martin resigned as "Protector of Peru", Castilla sided with José de la Riva Agüero, who in turn shortly became president in 1823.

He was incorporated as a cavalry second lieutenant into a squadron of the Peruvian Legion of the Guard (later called the Junín Hussars), which was then being formed. Ramon Castilla worked intensively in the recruitment and training of volunteers. After San Martín's resignation as Protector of Peru, he placed himself at the service of the new government established in Lima. For his services in the organization of Peruvian troops, he was promoted to major and then to lieutenant colonel of cavalry.

He served loyally under President José de la Riva Agüero until the latter attempted to negotiate with the Spanish, at which point he supported the rebellion of Colonel Antonio Gutiérrez de la Fuente, who imprisoned the president on 25 November 1823. Castilla was commissioned to arrest General Ramón Herrera, the army commander, who was in Santa.

In 1824, when the Peruvian Congress named Simón Bolívar dictator or "Liberator of Peru", Castilla joined Simon Bolivar's army, fighting in the decisive Battle of Ayacucho, which helped Peru gain its independence from Spain. In 1825 Bolivar named him as governor of his native province of Tarapacá. In 1833, Castilla married Francisca Diez-Canseco y Corbacho.

=== Participation in the new republic ===
As sub-prefect of Tarapacá, he opposed Bolívar's Constitution for Life and the political project of creating the Federation of the Andes. When the Congress meeting failed, it was decided that the Constitution would be approved through the Electoral Colleges. All approved it, except for the one from Tarapacá, presumably due to Castilla's opposition (1826).

With the end of Bolivarian influence and the establishment of José de la Mar's government, and faced with the imminent conflict with Gran Colombia, he was transferred to Arequipa with the mission of organizing the reserve; there he uncovered a conspiracy plotted by supporters of Bolivian President Andrés de Santa Cruz to secede the southern departments in August 1829, and acted as prosecutor in the case brought against them.

Promoted to colonel, he went to Lima in 1830. President Agustín Gamarra appointed him his aide-de-camp, and together they marched to Cusco to fight the federalist revolution started by Colonel Gregorio Escobedo, which was suppressed that same day by the people of Cusco themselves. Nevertheless, Castilla continued to the Bolivian border and assumed command of the reserve division garrisoning the region. There was then a serious threat of armed conflict with Bolivia, but for the time being it was resolved peacefully.

Back in Lima, Castilla criticized the policies of President Gamarra and was implicated in the conspiracy of Congressman Iguaín. Arrested on 1 January 1832, he was first imprisoned in the Real Felipe Fortress and then on a pontoon anchored in Callao. It is said that he unwittingly betrayed Captain Felipe Rossel, a trusted officer of the president, who was eventually executed. While imprisoned, Castilla fell ill and was transferred to the Santa Ana Hospital, from where he escaped, embarking for Chile in May 1833. His trial was suspended, and he was later acquitted.

In November 1833, he reappeared in Tarapacá, where he supported the proclamation of General Luis José de Orbegoso as provisional president. He then went to Arequipa and, when General Pedro Bermúdez's rebellion broke out, he remained loyal to the government and participated in the campaign against the southern rebels, who were defeated at the Battle of Cangallo. With internal peace restored after the Embrace of Maquinhuayo, he was promoted to Brigadier General.

In Chile, Castilla joined the group of Peruvian émigrés who opposed the Peru–Bolivian Confederation project and hoped to return with the support of a Chilean expeditionary force, which the all-powerful Chilean minister Diego Portales was meticulously assembling. However, a group of Chilean officers opposed this expedition and mutinied in Quillota on 3 June 1837, arresting Portales. Castilla joined the Chilean forces sent to quell the uprising, commanding the Junín Cuirassiers, a corps of 150 Peruvian volunteers. The mutineers were defeated at the Battle of Cerro Barón, but Portales was killed; nevertheless, the Chilean government's war plans continued.

From Chile, the so-called Restorative Expeditions were organized against the Confederation, composed of allied Chilean and Peruvian armies, which Castilla joined. In the first expedition, Castilla was head of the Peruvian Legion and prefect of Arequipa. He had serious disagreements with Manuel Ignacio de Vivanco, the leader of the Peruvian expeditionaries. This expedition failed in Arequipa, and Castilla, along with the rest of the restorationists, returned to Chile.

In 1839 Castilla beside the Chilean general Manuel Bulnes decided the victory of the Restorative Army in the battle of Yungay (War of the Confederation) and was named Minister of War and Minister of Finance in 1839 under Agustín Gamarra. Under the latter post, Castilla was responsible for Peru's first lucrative guano exportation. Meanwhile, president Gamarra had been harboring intentions of annexing Bolivia back to Peru and, in 1841, he led an invasion army to Bolivia, only to be defeated and killed by the army of José Ballivián during the Battle of Ingavi, leaving Peru without a leader. During that year various infights among caudillos occurred who constantly proclaimed themselves Presidents. Manuel Menéndez, then Vice President, assumed the presidency, but was overthrown by a coup d'état led by Juan Crisóstomo Torrico in 1842.

Soon after, Castilla, along with Domingo Nieto, overthrew Manuel Ignacio de Vivanco during the Battle of Carmen Alto. Nieto assumed the presidency but died a few months later. Castilla assumed the position on 17 February 1844 until 11 December of that year. After defeating the other caudillos around the country, Castilla reinstated Menéndez as president, in order to achieve a constitutional transition to democracy.

== Political career ==
=== First presidency ===
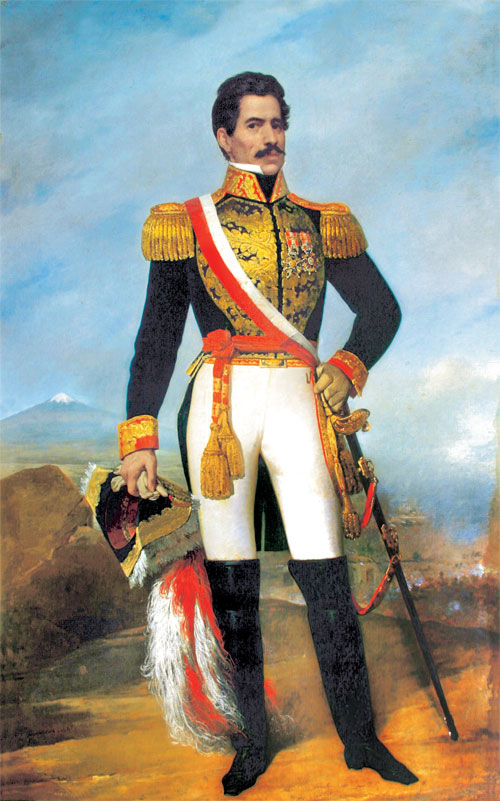
Castilla during his 1st presidency

In 1845, Castilla won the Peruvian presidential elections and was sworn in in April of that year. During this time, the guano export boom was rapidly expanding, largely due to treaties signed with the British company Antony Gibbs, which had commercialized the guano trade in Europe. The main source of guano came from the Chincha Islands Important urban projects began during this period, too, such as the first railroad from Lima to Callao, which helped in the transportation of guano from the production centers ready to be shipped abroad.

The discovery and commercialization of guano united sectors of the elite around the formation of a stronger state capable of administering these resources. Castilla established an accounting office that produced Peru's first official budget in 1847, reopened the Bellavista Military Academy to professionalize the army, and repressed several uprisings in 1848 and 1849. In 1851, he oversaw the construction of South America's first railway, linking Lima with the port of Callao.

Castillas government was moderate and progressive. He pursued a policy of concord, repealing the expatriation decrees issued against the defeated members of the Confederation. In 1847, he even restored their rights, having omitted from the outset to persecute the supporters of Vivanco's regime; moreover, he employed competent men in administrative positions.

When Castilla came to power, Peru had a substantial internal and external debt, which he resolved to pay with the revenues from guano. The internal debt was owed to individuals who had contributed, in kind or in cash, to the War of Independence and during the subsequent wars and revolutions. The external debt was contracted with several countries: England and Gran Colombia, incurred during the independence struggle; Chile, for the expenses of San Martín's liberating army and the restoration armies; Spain, as stipulated in the Capitulation of Ayacucho; and also France and the United States.

By laws given in 1847, 1848 and 1850, Castilla ordered the payment of the internal debt, a payment known as the "consolidation of the internal debt", which would cause a tremendous corruption scandal in the following government of Echenique.

Castilla, being experienced in the military field, dedicated himself to national defense, considering that Peru bordered four countries, all always ready to attack. His extended stay in Chile during the Portales era made him clearly see the danger that being unarmed posed to Peru. Therefore, he undertook numerous military modernization projects. Castilla's also implemented numerous international policies, aimed at giving Peru the prominence it deserved among the countries of the Americas and the world.

Castilla, advised by experts on the subject, addressed the educational problem that had been neglected since the founding of the Republic. On 14 June 1850, he issued the first Regulations for Public Instruction, by which the State assumed the direction and administration of education in the country. He also began to separate the three levels of education offered in schools, colleges, and universities, although he maintained the existence of the Colegios Mayores (higher colleges), one of which became the Colegio Guadalupe, thus perpetuating the confusion that had existed since colonial times between secondary and higher education.

After six years in power, Castilla was succeeded by José Rufino Echenique. In 1854, however, another rebellion was led in Peru's second-largest city, Arequipa, by Castilla himself, who was largely urged by other Peruvian liberals to help in the suppression of slavery in the country.

=== Second provisional presidency ===
On 3 December 1854, during his second term, in the city of Huancayo, an abolition of slavery law was passed. This was a big blow to elites engaged in quasi-slave labor in the highlands, both in the agricultural and the mining sector. As this law was being applied, Castilla confronted and defeated Echenique in the Battle of La Palma on 5 January 1855.

Following the Battle of La Palma, a provisional government was established in Lima with Castilla as President, and the liberals Pedro Gálvez, Manuel Toribio Ureta, and Domingo Elías as ministers, plus General Miguel de San Román, who occupied the Ministry of War. An important measure was the decree of 25 March 1855, signed by Castilla and Pedro Gálvez in the city of Huancayo, which announced absolute freedom of expression through the press; a great advance that complemented the important liberal decrees abolishing slavery and the indigenous labor tax.

But the first and most important measure taken by the government was to call elections for a National Convention or Congress, whose purpose would be to reform the Constitution. For the first time, elections were called with direct and universal suffrage: direct, because representatives to the new Congress would not be elected through Electoral Colleges, but directly; and universal, because all Peruvians would vote without any limitations, regardless of illiteracy or poverty. However, elections for President were not called.

Following the elections, the National Convention convened on 14 July 1855, and ratified Castilla as Provisional President. Once his government was in place, Castilla, of an authoritarian temperament, dismissed his liberal ministers and summoned his allies. This marked the beginning of his break with the liberals.

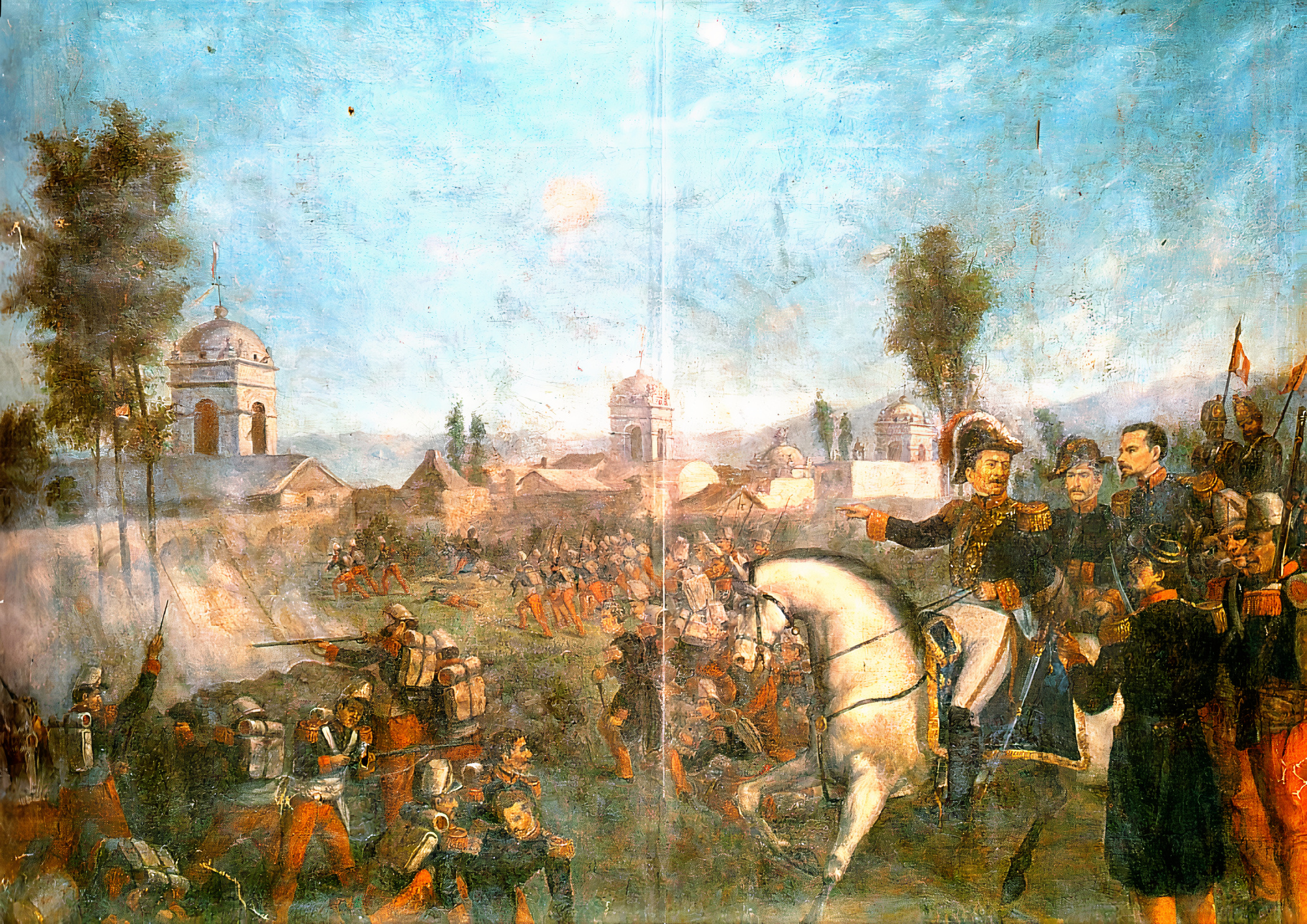
Assault on Arequipa led by Castilla in the Civil War of 1856–1858

In 1859, Peru had a confrontation with neighboring Ecuador over disputed territory bordering the Amazon. Though Peru was considered successful, Castilla failed to secure a definitive agreement with Ecuador and the issue would haunt both countries until the end of the 20th century, when the 1997 Peace and Border Treaty of Itamaraty was signed by Peru and Ecuador in Brazil. In December 1860, a new constitution was enacted during Castilla's presidency and became Peru's supreme law until 1920. Castilla's second presidency, therefore, was marked by the liberation of slaves and indigenous Peruvians, as well as a new postal system among other things.

The conservatives, dissatisfied with the prevailing liberal regime, rallied around General Manuel Ignacio de Vivanco and rose up against the government. The Peruvian Civil War of 1856–1858 broke out in Arequipa on 31 October 1856, where the recently proclaimed Constitution was burned in a public act. From there it spread to Moquegua, Ayacucho, and Piura. The navy joined the movement; among the rebel sailors were Miguel Grau and Lizardo Montero. Taking advantage of their control of the sea, the revolutionaries headed north, but failed in their attempt to incite rebellion in that part of Peru. They then set sail for Callao, landing and attacking the population on 22 April 1857, an attack that was repelled by the people of Callao. As a reward for this act, Callao was designated a Constitutional Province for having defended the constitutional government. The rebels were defeated after the assault on Arequipa in 1858.

=== Third presidency ===
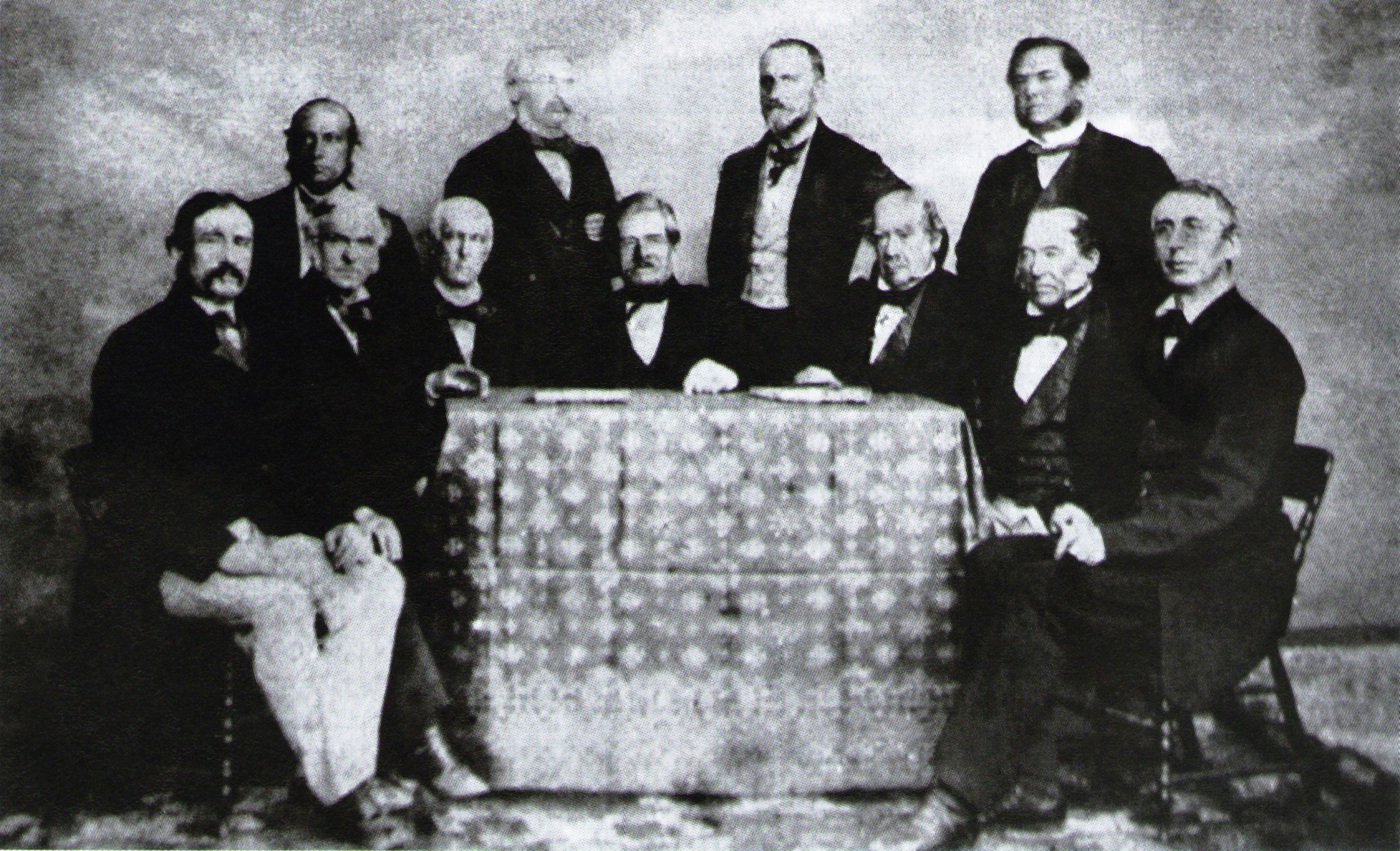
Ramón Castilla and his group of ministers

Although Vivanco's rebellion failed, his intention—that is, to end the influence of liberals in government decisions—ultimately prevailed. The Convention, dissolved in November 1857, was never reconvened, and the main liberal leaders were even sent into exile.

Castilla called for elections for an Extraordinary Congress and for the election of the Constitutional President of the Republic, since he was only the provisional president. He ran as a candidate. Meanwhile, important liberal leaders such as Benito Laso, Francisco Javier Mariátegui, José Gálvez Egúsquiza, Francisco de Paula González Vigil, and José Gregorio Paz Soldán organized and launched the candidacy of General José Miguel Medina. Castilla won the elections. The new Congress convened on 12 October 1858, and proclaimed Castilla Constitutional President for a four-year term.

In 1862, he was succeeded by Miguel de San Román, who died less than a year later. Castilla refused to recognise Pedro Diez Canseco, the Second Vice President of the Republic as well as his brother-in-law, and claimed the presidency for himself. Diez Canseco, however, was chosen as interim president from April to August 1863, and was succeeded by Juan Antonio Pezet. He served as the President of the Senate in 1864.

After he returned to Peru, he was again deported to Chile on the orders of then president Mariano Ignacio Prado. In a last effort to regain power for a fifth time, Castilla – now nearly seventy – and a group of followers landed in Pisagua and proceeded towards the Tiviliche desert. This last try, however, proved fatal, and Castilla died at Tiviliche, in his final attempt to pass through southern Peru on 30 May 1867.

=== Final years ===
In 1864, Castilla was elected senator for Tarapacá and president of its chamber; from this position he condemned the international policy of Pezet's government regarding the aggression of the Spanish Pacific squadron. He personally went to the Government Palace to harshly rebuke Pezet, for which he was arrested and sent into exile, being taken to the beaches of Gibraltar in February 1865. But this measure did not benefit the government, as Pezet ended up being overthrown, thanks precisely to the revolutionary spark that Castilla had ignited, which would give rise to figures belonging to the second generation after independence. During his absence, the historic Battle of Callao took place, which became Spain's final and unsuccessful move to reconquer independent Peru in which Peru successfully defeat Spain in the Chincha Islands War.

== Death ==
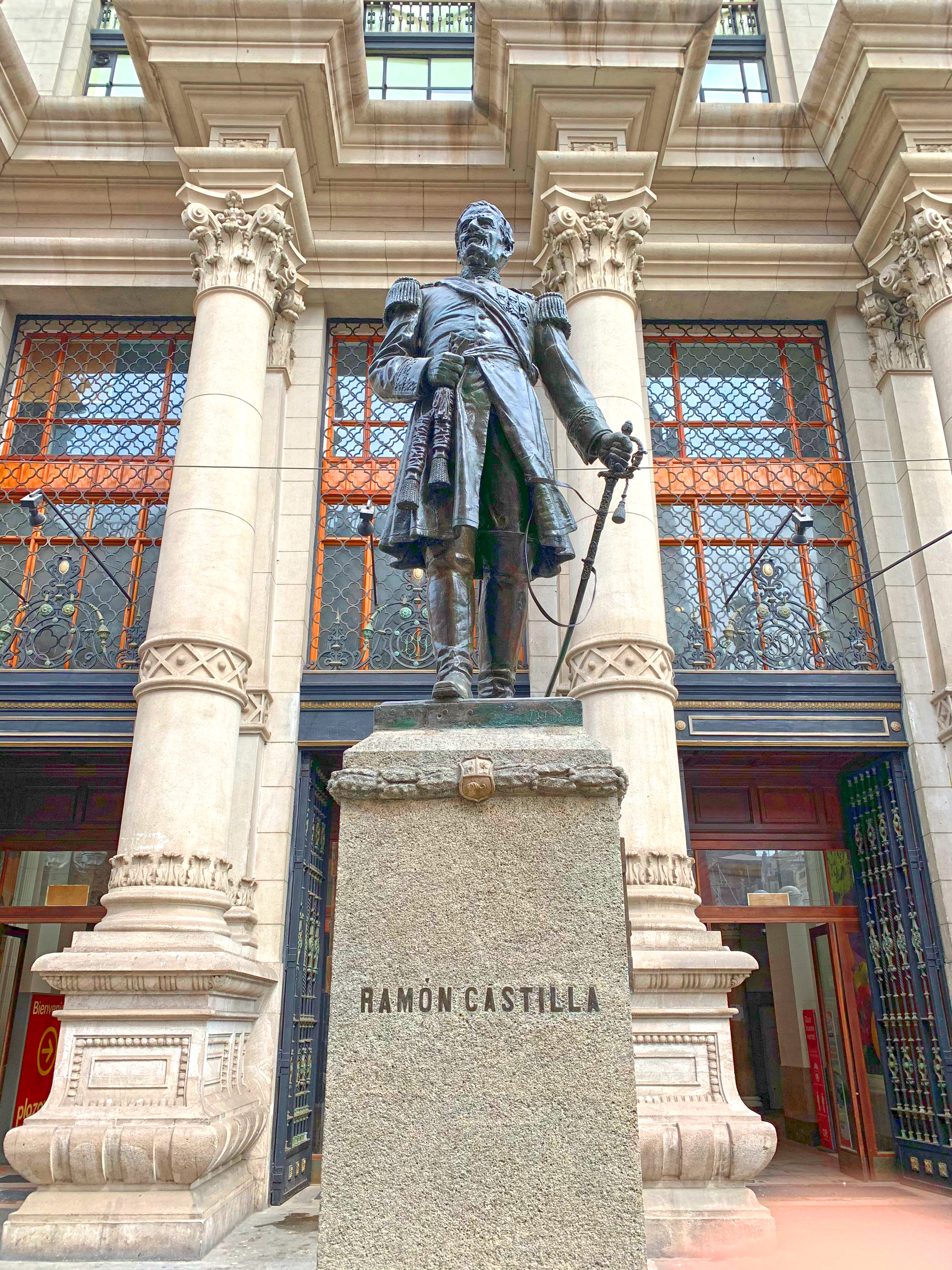
Monument dedicated to Ramón Castilla in the Plazoleta de la Merced

Upon his return to Peru on 17 May 1866, Castilla was honored in Lima, where, upon raising his glass, he said: "I toast, gentlemen, to the old men who won independence and to the young men who, on 2 May, consolidated it." But he opposed President Mariano Ignacio Prado and was deported to Chile; from there, already in his seventies, he rebelled in defense of the moderate Constitution of 1860, which the government was attempting to replace with the liberal Constitution of 1867. He landed in Pisagua with a small escort, returning to Peru with the intention of leading the revolution. He set out on an overland journey to the city of Arica, but with his health severely failing and overwhelmed by the scorching heat, he died in the Tiliviche Valley on 30 May 1867. His last words were a prayer offered to the Supreme Being: "Lord, one more month of life and I will have brought happiness to my country. No, a few more days."

By law passed by the Congress of the Republic on 25 June 1867, the Executive Branch was instructed to make the necessary arrangements for Castilla's funeral, which was to be held in Lima. The government of Colonel Mariano Ignacio Prado (against whom Castilla had rebelled) ordered 16,000 soles to be spent on the Marshal's mausoleum, which was to bear the inscription: "Peru to the Grand Marshal Ramón Castilla." A congressional commission attended the funeral, and his widow, Francisca Diez-Canseco, was granted a pension as if her husband had died in garrison. Castilla's death had a profound impact throughout the country and temporarily halted the offensive of the government's opponents, prior to the outbreak of the revolution that overthrew the government of Mariano Ignacio Prado. Castilla has since been laid to rest in the Cripta de los Héroes in the Cementerio Presbítero Matías Maestro in Lima.

== Legacy ==
Ramón Castilla is, in short, the best of the first fifty years of the Peruvian Republic. He is that figure whom everyone calls taita (father), the liberator of the black man, the redeemer of the indigenous man, a very simple man of the people, whose name resonated deeply with the masses. A true patriot, his love for Peru was not merely boastful, but was demonstrated in practice beyond measure, both as a soldier and a ruler. He knew how to be both a leader and a statesman, and he brought order and prosperity to the State; that is why, at the cry of "¡Viva Castilla!" people went to their deaths, and at that same cry revolutions were made and unmade until the very day of his death.

— Jorge Basadre, Historia de la República del Perú

Robert T. Conn, in Bolívar's Afterlife in the Americas, writes that Ramón Castilla is largely considered as one of Peru's greatest presidents. Apart from the sumptuous mausoleum erected in the Presbítero Maestro Cemetery, it took a long time for a monument worthy of the Grand Marshal's memory to be erected in the center of Lima. The first was inaugurated in 1915 in the Plazoleta de la Merced, and was the work of the Lima sculptor David Lozano. This monument, of modest dimensions, represents a pedestrian effigy of Castilla in a simple pose.

The grand, symbolic monument had to wait longer. In 1967, to commemorate the centenary of Castilla's death, Plaza Unión was chosen as the site for the equestrian statue of the Grand Marshal . The commission was awarded to the sculptor José Luis Peña y Peña from Pisco. At the time, the President of the Republic was architect Fernando Belaúnde, and the Mayor of Lima was Dr. Luis Bedoya Reyes. The monument was inaugurated in 1969, and the name of the public space was changed to Plaza Castilla, though it is a name rarely used today.

== See also ==
- Bust of Ramón Castilla, Houston, Texas
- Politics of Peru
- List of presidents of Peru

== Notes ==
Political offices
Preceded by Domingo Nieto	President of the Supreme Provisory Junta; 1844	Succeeded by Domingo Elías
Preceded by Manuel Menéndez	President of Peru; 1845–1851	Succeeded by José Rufino Echenique
Preceded by José Rufino Echenique	President of Peru; 1855–1862	Succeeded by Miguel de San Román
Preceded by Miguel de San Román	Interim President of Peru; 1863	Succeeded by Pedro Diez Canseco
