= Jorge Basadre =

Peruvian historian (1903–1980)

Jorge Basadre OSP
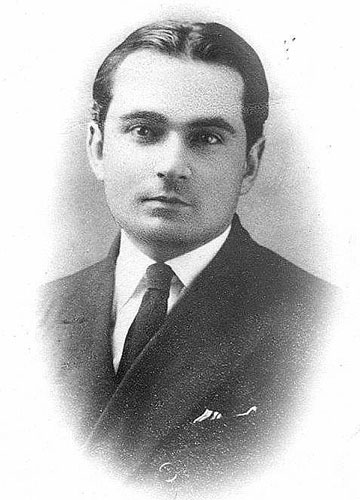
- Basadre c. 1924
- Born: Jorge Alfredo Basadre Grohmann; 12 February 1903; Tacna, Chile (Note: After the Treaty of Ancón, Tacna was administered by Chile, and its fate was to be determined by a plebiscite which was never held. In 1929, after negotiations, the territory was returned to Peru under the Treaty of Lima.)
- Died: 29 June 1980 (aged 77); Lima, Peru
- Citizenship: Peruvian
- Education: National University of San Marcos
- Occupations: Historian; politician; librarian
- Employers: National Library of Peru; Pontifical Catholic University of Peru
- Notable work: Historia de la República del Perú
- Spouse: Isabel Ayulo Lacroix (m. 1935)
- Children: 1
- Parents: Carlos Basadre Forero (father); Olga Eloísa Grohmann Butler (mother)
- Awards: Order of the Sun of Peru; Order of Merit of the Federal Republic of Germany

Minister of Education of Peru
- In office 28 July 1945 – 6 October 1945
- President: José Luis Bustamante y Rivero
- Prime Minister: Rafael Belaúnde Diez Canseco
- Preceded by: Enrique Laroza
- Succeeded by: Luis E. Valcárcel
- In office 28 July 1956 – 1958
- President: Manuel Prado Ugarteche
- Prime Minister: Manuel Cisneros Sánchez
- Preceded by: Juan Mendoza Rodríguez
- Succeeded by: Ulises Montoya Manfredi

Jorge Alfredo Basadre Grohmann (12 February 1903 – 29 June 1980) was a Peruvian historian known for his extensive publications about the independent history of his country. He served during two different administrations as Minister of Education and was also director of the Peruvian National Library.

== Early life ==
Jorge Basadre was born to Carlos Basadre Forero and Olga Eloísa Grohmann Butler in Tacna, which was then under Chilean administration. Basadre said that his great grandfather was José Toribio Ara y Cáceres, a cacique who participated in the Peruvian War of Independence. Basadre began his training at the Liceo Santa Rosa, a Peruvian school that operated clandestinely in Tacna but changed to the German School of Lima when his family moved to this city in 1912. He undertook his final year of secondary education at the College of Our Lady of Guadalupe in 1918.

In 1919, Basadre entered the National University of San Marcos where he graduated as a Ph.D. in humanities in 1928 and in law in 1935. While studying, he intervened in the University Conversation of 1919, along with other young students of the so-called Generation of the Reformation, and he also worked at the Peruvian National Library from 1919 up to 1930. He was a professor at the Universidad Nacional Mayor de San Marcos in 1928, teaching a course in the History of Peru. In 1929 he assumed the titular chair of History of the Republic of Peru, and in 1935 that of History of Peruvian Law, which he held until 1954 (although with intervals due to absences outside the country), when he departed from professional teaching to devote himself entirely to research. He undertook postgraduate studies in the United States and Germany between 1931 and 1935, receiving a scholarship from the Carnegie Institution to study in the United States and taking his courses at the Humboldt University of Berlin. During that time, he traveled to Spain to conduct research in archives at the University of Seville.

== Public life ==
Between 1925 and 1926 he was part of the Peruvian delegation that was sent to the south to coordinate the holding of the Tacna and Arica plebiscite. He was carrying out this task when he was wounded by a stone in the head, thrown by a Chilean nationalist. The plebiscite was never held due to lack of guarantees. Two years later, Tacna was definitively reincorporated to Peru, while Arica remained in the power of Chile (1929).

Back in Peru, Basadre became director of the Central Library at San Marcos University, which he reorganized between 1936 and 1942. After a fire in the Peruvian National Library on 9 May 1943, Basadre was named its director and put in charge of its reconstruction. His work here included rebuilding the book collection and organizing the publishing of the Library magazine, Fénix, as well as Anuario Bibliográfico Peruano. After facing long hours of work and overcoming great difficulties, in September 1948 he was able to finally reopen the renovated National Library.

For a short period in 1945 he was named Minister of Education by president José Luis Bustamante y Rivero. He was elected to the presidency of the Instituto Histórico del Perú (Historic Institute of Peru) for the period 1956-1962. Peruvian president Manuel Prado Ugarteche named him Minister of Education a second time in 1956, a post he held until his resignation in 1958.

He was professor of History of Peru at Guadalupe College (1929-1931) and at the National Pedagogical Institute (1930-1931); exerted the doctoral chair of History of Peru at the Pontifical Catholic University of Peru (1935); and he was professor of critical history of Peru at the Chorrillos Military School (1941-1945).

He was secretary general of the XXVII International Congress of Americanists, based in Lima (1939).

He was president of the Historical Institute of Peru (today National Academy of History), from 1956 to 1962; member of the Peruvian Academy of Language (since 1941) and member of the Geographical Society of Lima.

He was awarded the Order of the Sun of Peru in the degree of Grand Cross in 1979.

== Private life ==
He married Isabel Ayulo and had a son named Jorge Basadre Ayulo.

== Publications ==
Basadre was a prolific writer; his numerous works on the history of Peru in the 19th and 20th centuries are still a benchmark for historians interested in this period. His publications include La multitud, la ciudad y el campo en la historia del Perú (1929), La iniciación de la República (1929-1930), Perú, problema y posibilidad (1931), La promesa de la vida peruana (1943), El conde de Lemos y su tiempo (1945), Meditaciones sobre el destino histórico del Perú (1947), Chile, Perú y Bolivia independientes (1948), El Perú en la cronología universal, 1776-1801 (1957), El azar en la historia y sus límites (1971), La vida y la historia (1975) and Elecciones y centralismo en el Perú (1980).

=== Historia de la República del Perú ===
Basadre's most important work is his Historia de la República del Perú (History of the Republic of Peru), first published as a single volume in 1939. It grew in size with every new edition until reaching sixteen volumes in the 6th edition of 1968. By that time it covered with rigorous detail Peruvian history from Independence in 1821 until the death of president Luis Miguel Sánchez Cerro in 1933. Basadre supplemented this work in 1971, with the publication of Introducción a las bases documentales para la Historia de la República del Perú, a thorough review of primary sources about the republican history of Peru.

This work has been published since Basadre's death in 1980 by important publishers, such as La República and El Comercio, among others, being expanded until more recent times. It is considered the most important work of Peru's republican history, with its divisions of history on different eras being considered as a standard at a national level.

== Death and legacy ==
Jorge Basadre died on 29 June 1980, in the city of Lima at the age of 77. His body was taken from the Clínica San Borja to his house at Orrantia Avenue (renamed in his honour) in San Isidro, where his wake took place.

A Peruvian University is named after him, Jorge Basadre Grohmann National University in Tacna. Since 1991, when the nuevo sol became the official currency of Peru, his portrait has appeared on the S/. 100 banknote. In 2008 a province that bears his name in his honor was created in Tacna.

== Bibliography ==
- López Martínez, Héctor (2005). Jorge Basadre. Su legado histórico y ético [Jorge Basadre. Its historical and ethical legacy.]. Included in Basadre, Jorge (2005) [First published 1939]. Historia de la República del Perú (1822 - 1933) [History of the Republic of Peru (1822 - 1933)] (in Spanish). Vol. 17 (9th ed.). Lima: El Comercio. pp. 269–284. ISBN 9972-205-79-7.
- Sobrevilla, David (1982). Las ideas en el Perú contemporáneo [Ideas in contemporary Peru]. Included in Bustamante y Rivero, José Luis (1985) [First published 1980]. Mejía Baca, Juan (ed.). Historia del Perú [History of Peru]. Procesos e Instituciones (in Spanish). Vol. XI (4th ed.). Lima: Editorial Mejía Baca. ISBN 84-499-1616-X.
- Tauro del Pino, Alberto (2001). Enciclopedia Ilustrada del Perú [Illustrated Encyclopedia of Peru] (in Spanish). Vol. 2 (3rd ed.). Lima: PEISA. ISBN 9972-40-151-0.
- Hampe, Teodoro (2000). "Basadre Grohmann, Jorge (1903-1980)" [Great Smiths of Peru]. Grandes Forjadores del Perú (in Spanish). Lima: Lexus Editores. ISBN 9972-625-50-8.
