= José Rufino Echenique =

President of Peru from 1851 to 1855

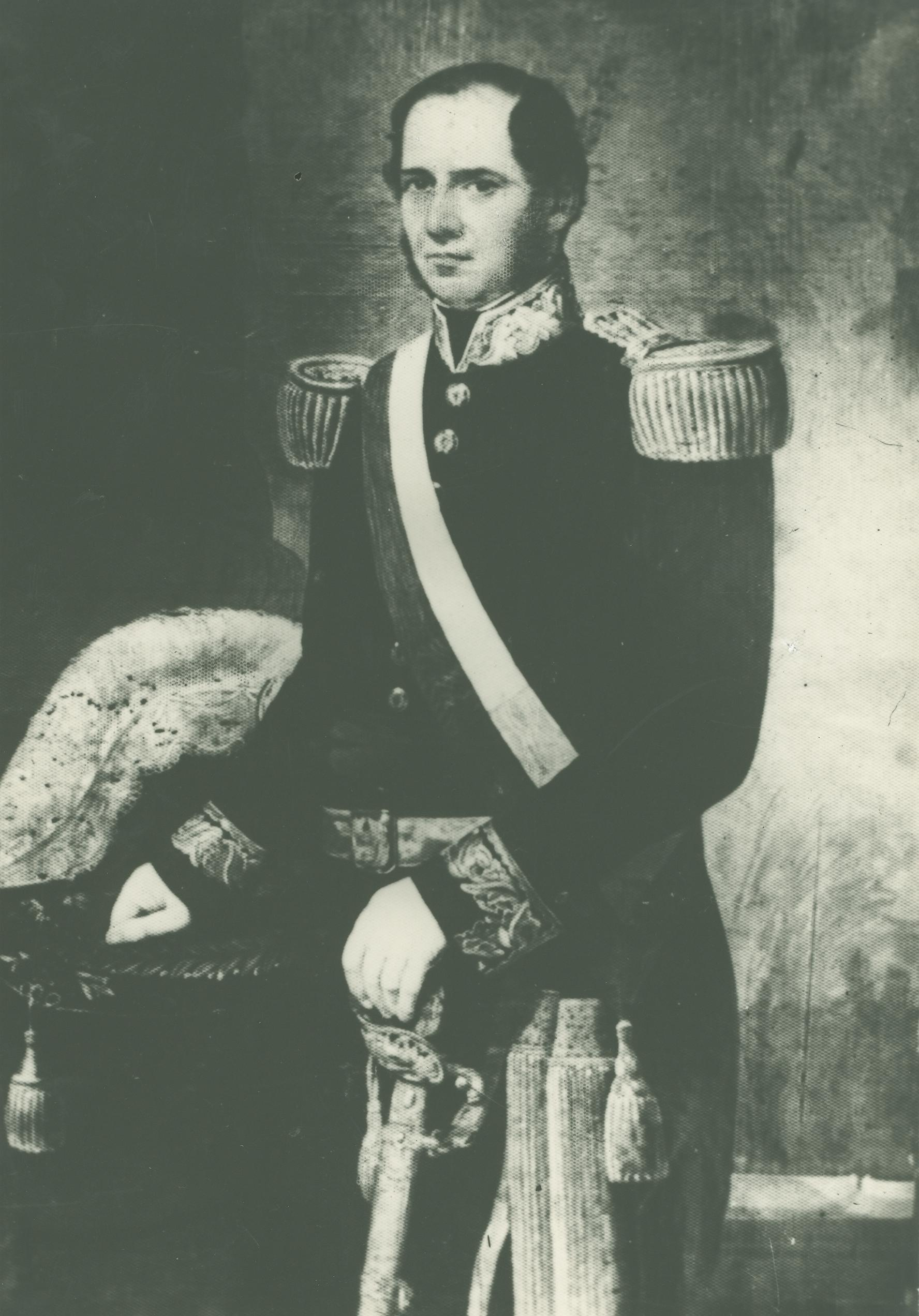

President of Peru
- In office April 20, 1851 – January 5, 1855
- Preceded by: Ramón Castilla
- Succeeded by: Ramón Castilla

Personal details
- Born: José Rufino Pompeyo Echenique Benavente; November 16, 1808 Puno, Viceroyalty of Peru, Spanish Empire
- Died: June 16, 1887 (aged 78) Lima, Peru

Military service
- Allegiance: Peru
- Branch/service: Peruvian Army
- Years of service: 1821–1854
- Rank: Brigadier general
- Battles/wars: Peruvian War of Independence: Second Intermedios Campaign; 1828 Peruvian–Bolivian War; 1834 Peruvian Civil War; Gran Colombia–Peru War: Battle of Tarqui; 1843–44 Peruvian Civil War: Battle of Carmen Alto; Liberal Revolution of 1854

José Rufino Pompeyo Echenique Benavente (November 16, 1808 – June 16, 1887) was a Peruvian politician who served as the President of Peru from April 1851 to January 1855.

== Biography ==
He participated in the Peruvian War of Independence and the Peruvian Civil Wars of 1834 and 1843–44. Echenique won the 1851 Peruvian presidential election to succeed Ramón Castilla. Under his government, the first civil laws of Peru were promulgated. The finalizing phase of the construction of the Tacna-Arica railroad was also completed.

Echenique was overthrown by the Liberal Revolution of 1854 led by Ramón Castilla in 1855 after a ball hosted by his wife, Victoria Tristán. He served as the President of the Chamber of Deputies in 1864, and President of the Senate from 1868 to 1871.

His son, Juan Martín Echenique, was also active in Peruvian politics.

Echenique hosted the Post-Impressionist painter Paul Gauguin and Gauguin's mother in his presidential home in central Lima from 1849 to 1854, during Gauguin's childhood.

Echenique is credited with stating that the country ought to change its racial demographics to "improve the race", which was reflected in the immigration efforts promoted under his government that brought a number of Germans and Austrians, Irish, Spaniards and other Europeans to Peru.

== See also ==
- List of presidents of Peru

Political offices
Preceded by Ramón Castilla	President of Peru; 1851–1855	Succeeded by Ramón Castilla
