= Francisco Diez Canseco =

Francisco Diez-Canseco Corbacho
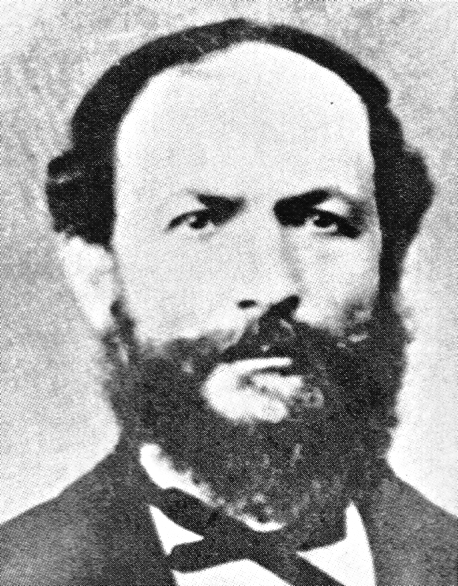

Interim President of Peru
- In office July 26, 1872 – July 27, 1872
- Preceded by: Tomás Gutiérrez
- Succeeded by: Mariano Herencia Zevallos

Second Vice President of Peru
- In office August 2, 1868 – July 27, 1872

Minister of War
- In office July 27, 1872 – August 2, 1872
- Preceded by: Tomás Gutiérrez
- Succeeded by: José Miguel Medina
- In office After 18 July 1881 – ?

Personal details
- Born: Francisco Diez-Canseco Corbacho; March 21, 1821 Arequipa, Peru
- Died: October 5, 1884 Lima, Peru
- Parents: Manuel José Diez Canseco Nieto; María Mercedes Corbacho Abril de Diez Canseco
- Relatives: Pedro Diez Canseco
- Education: Phillips Academy
- Occupation: Politician

Military service
- Allegiance: Peru; Chile
- Branch/service: Peruvian Army; Chilean Army; Restoration Army
- Years of service: 1835-c. 1883 (Peru) c. 1837-1842 (Chile)
- Rank: Brigadier general
- Battles/wars: Peruvian-Bolivian War (POW); Battle of Agua Santa; Peruvian Civil War (1843-44); Arequipa Revolution; Peruvian Civil War (1865); Peruvian Civil War (1867); 1872 Peruvian coup d'état War of the Pacific

Francisco Diez Canseco Corbacho (21 March 1821 – 5 October 1884) served as Interim President of Peru for a brief period during 1872. He was the brother of General Pedro Diez Canseco.

Diez Canseco served as the second vice president from 1868 to 1872. While vice president, he had to briefly assume the presidency of Peru following the lynching of Tomás Gutiérrez. He was succeeded by Mariano Herencia Zevallos.

== Biography ==
He was the son of Manuel José Diez Canseco Nieto and María Mercedes Corbacho Abril de Diez Canseco, belonging to the Arequipa high society of Spanish origin. He was the brother of Generals Pedro Diez Canseco and Manuel Diez Canseco, as well as Francisca Diez Canseco, wife of President Ramón Castilla.

In 1835 he entered the army as a cadet and became an assistant to General Ramón Castilla, who promoted him to second lieutenant. He accompanied Castile on his trip to Lima, when he went to meet General Felipe Santiago Salaverry, and then followed him on his flight to Chile, after the establishment of the Peru-Bolivian Confederation.

He was part of the group of Peruvian exiles in Chile. He was a member of the Cazadores Battalion, and in the Battle of Cerro Barón of 1837, he helped defeat the mutineers who assassinated Chilean Minister Diego Portales. He enlisted in the restorative expeditions and fought in the Battle of Portada de Guías and Yungay.

He served the restorative government headed by General Agustín Gamarra. He was promoted to lieutenant and assigned to the garrison of the department of Puno. Under the orders of Castila, he fought against the regenerationist revolution of Manuel Ignacio de Vivanco. He later participated in the war against Bolivia. During the Battle of Ingavi he was promoted to captain by President Gamarra, whom he then assisted during his agony in 1841. He was taken prisoner and confined in Santa Cruz de la Sierra, until the signing of the peace treaty with Bolivia, in 1842.

He returned to Peru and served the government of General Juan Crisóstomo Torrico until his defeat in the battle of Agua Santa, on October 17, 1842. He then put himself at the service of the government of General Juan Francisco de Vidal, who promoted him to sergeant major in 1843. Then he joined the constitutional revolution led by Generals Domingo Nieto and Ramón Castilla. He fought in combat over the Pampas River and in the battle of Carmen Alto, on July 22, 1844, which crowned the victory of the Constitutionalists.

In the first government of Castila, he was sent to Tacna, where he was in charge of subduing the rebellion fueled by General José Félix Iguaín, who, in agreement with Bolivian President José Ballivián, wanted to separate the Peruvian south to confederate it with Bolivia. Later, he stationed himself in Puno, in order to neutralize Bolivian attempts to attack Peru again in 1848.

Promoted to colonel in 1851, he became aide-de-camp to President José Rufino Echenique, but joined the revolution that Castilla led in Arequipa, participating throughout the campaign that concluded with the revolutionary triumph in the battle of La Palma, on the 5th January 1855.

Appointed chief of the military plaza in Lima, he was in charge of maintaining order while the naval squad, which had joined the Vivanquista revolution of 1856, raided the coast. He was also appointed Governor of the Chincha Islands, a position he held from 1857 to 1861. These islands had rich deposits of guano, which was then the main source of resources for the State, hence their importance.

Appointed prefect of Callao in 1861, the following year he became part of the corps of hostesses of President Miguel de San Román. During the brief government of his brother, in 1863, General Pedro Diez Canseco was appointed prefect of Lima, a position in which he remained at the request of President Juan Antonio Pezet.

In 1865 he was promoted to brigadier general and took command in the capital when President Pezet had to leave to face the advance of the revolution led in the south by Mariano Ignacio Prado and Pedro Diez Canseco. He tenaciously defended the Government Palace, which fell after a violent six-hour combat. Circumstances had made him face his own brother Pedro, who was inflexible, being arrested and removed from service. But then came the dictatorial government of Mariano Ignacio Prado, who, in 1867, after the victorious war against Spain, wanted to remain in power. This time, Francisco placed himself under the command of his brother, Pedro, who led the rebellion in defense of the Constitution from Arequipa, while he was conspiring in Lima. He received from his brother the appointment of political and military chief of the departments of the center, and had an important role in the fall of Prado, by taking Callao and then Lima, on January 8, 1868.

After the resignation of Prado as president, Francisco momentarily took charge of the Executive Power for fourteen days. He then handed over the command to his brother Pedro, who was legally responsible due to him being the second constitutional vice president, according to the elections of 1862, considered the last legitimate ones.

Later, he was elected second vice president of the Republic of the government headed by José Balta (1868-1872), and in such capacity, he assumed the supreme command in two brief opportunities:

- Due to an illness of President Balta, from June 27 to 28, 1871.
- Due to the coup d'état and subsequent killing of Balta and the lynching of Colonel Tomás Gutiérrez, on July 26, 1872, while the decision was being made on who would assume the government.

In compliance with the Constitution of 1860, he handed over the command to the first vice president, General Mariano Herencia Zevallos, on July 27, 1872, in order for him to conclude the presidential term of Colonel Balta, which ended on August 2 of the same year. And in that brief period of seven days, he was Minister of War and Navy.

Retired to private life, he requested to return to service during the war with Chile, and disciplined some reserve units. During the brief administration of Francisco García Calderón, in 1881, he was again appointed Minister of War.

== See also ==
- List of presidents of Peru

Political offices
Preceded by Tomás Gutiérrez	Interim President of Peru; 1872	Succeeded by Mariano Herencia Zevallos
