= List of Peruvian coups d'état =

The following is a list of the coups d'état (including plots, failed and successful attempts and armed conflicts) that have taken place in Peru during its independent history.

No.	Name	Date	Result	Consequences
1	Balconcillo mutiny	February 27, 1823	Success	Carried out by a group of dissatisfied soldiers against the Supreme Governing Junta of José de la Mar. It resulted in the proclamation of José de la Riva Agüero as the first president of Peru.
2	1829 Peruvian coup d'état	June 7, 1829	Success	Carried out in Piura by Agustín Gamarra and a group of officers against President José de la Mar.
3	1834 Peruvian coup d'état	January 4, 1834	Failure	Carried out by "Supreme Chief" Pedro Pablo Bermúdez against the newly-elected President Luis José de Orbegoso. Bermúdez was quickly recognized by the military in the south, but he was ousted of the capital by the populace on January 28. His forces eventually betrayed him and reconciled with Bermudez on April 24.
4	1835 Peruvian coup d'état	February 23, 1835	Success	Carried out by "Supreme Chief" Felipe Santiago Salaverry against the government of President Luis José de Orbegoso, who was outside the capital. Salaverry nearly took over the entire country, but was defeated by the Bolivian forces of President Andrés de Santa Cruz, who executed him on February 18, 1836. This led to the formation of the Peru–Bolivian Confederation.
*	Peruvian restoration	August 21, 1838	Success	Carried out by Agustín Gamarra during the War of the Confederation. Gamarra occupied Lima, then part of North Peru, and proclaimed himself president of the restored Peruvian Republic. He secured power after defeating Santa Cruz at the Battle of Yungay in January 20, 1839.
5	1842 Peruvian coup d'état	August 16, 1842	Success	Carried out by "Supreme Chief" Juan Crisóstomo Torrico against Manuel Menéndez, acting president after the death of Gamarra during the Peruvian–Bolivian War. Torrico was defeated on October 17 by Juan Francisco de Vidal, who then restored the constitutional order.
6	1843 Peruvian coup d'état	January 28, 1843	Success	Uprising in Arequipa led by "Supreme Director" Manuel Ignacio de Vivanco against Justo Figuerola, the acting president. Figuerola was deposed in Lima on March 19, and Vivanco entered the city on April 7. His government lasted only two months, as in June Domingo Elías rose up in favor of constitutional order in Lima, and the following month Vivanco was defeated by Ramón Castilla at the Battle of Carmen Alto.
7	Liberal Revolution of 1854	January 5, 1855	Success	Carried out by former president Ramón Castilla against José Rufino Echenique, whose government had been discredited by corruption scandals. Castilla was then re-elected president in the 1858 Peruvian elections.
8	1865 Peruvian coup d'état	November 28, 1865	Success	Carried out by "Supreme Chief" Mariano Ignacio Prado against Pedro Diez Canseco for not taking quick and drastic measures regarding the problem with Spain. Prado was later ratified as president in the 1866 Peruvian general election.
9	1872 Peruvian coup d'état	July 22, 1872	Failure	Brothers Tomás, Silvestre, Marceliano, and Marcelino Gutiérrez carried out a coup against José Balta after the victory of Manuel Pardo y Lavalle in the 1872 elections. Tomás proclaimed himself "Supreme Chief", but was killed four days later by a mob and hanged alongside his brother Silvestre. Marceliano then killed José Balta, but was himself killed shortly after. Manuel Prado then became president of the Republic.
10	1879 Peruvian coup d'état	December 23, 1879	Success	Carried out by Nicolás de Piérola against first Vice President Luis La Puerta while President Mariano Ignacio Prado was outside the country, purchasing arms to use in the war against Chile.
11	1909 Peruvian coup d'état	May 29, 1909	Failure	Carried out by Carlos de Piérola, brother of former president Nicolás de Piérola, against President Augusto B. Leguía.
12	1914 Peruvian coup d'état	February 4, 1914	Success	Carried out by colonel Oscar R. Benavides against President Guillermo Billinghurst, who sought to dissolve the Congress.
13	1919 Peruvian coup d'état	July 4, 1919	Success	Carried out by president-elect Augusto B. Leguía against President José Pardo y Barreda.
14	1930 Peruvian coup d'état	August 22, 1930	Success	Carried out by commander Luis Miguel Sánchez Cerro against President Augusto B. Leguía.
15	1948 Peruvian coup d'état	October 29, 1948	Success	Carried out by commander Manuel A. Odría and right-wing associates against President José Luis Bustamante y Rivero.
16	1962 Peruvian coup d'état	July 18, 1962	Success	Carried out by the Armed Forces under Ricardo Pérez Godoy against President Manuel Prado Ugarteche.
17	1968 Peruvian coup d'état	October 3, 1968	Success	Carried out by general Juan Velasco Alvarado against President Fernando Belaúnde.
18	Tacnazo	August 29, 1975	Success	Carried out by General Francisco Morales Bermúdez, then President of the Council of Ministers, against Juan Velasco Alvarado.
19	1976 Peruvian coup attempt	July 9, 1976	Failure	Carried out by Carlos Bobbio Centurión against President Francisco Morales Bermúdez.
20	1992 Peruvian self-coup	April 5, 1992	Success	Carried out by President Alberto Fujimori with the support of the Armed Forces, dissolving Congress and closing other State-owned institutions.
21	1992 Peruvian counter-coup	November 13, 1992	Foiled	Plotted by retired general Jaime Salinas Sedó alongside a group of soldiers against President Alberto Fujimori in an attempt to restore the constitutional order.
20	2000 Peruvian coup attempt	September 2000	Foiled	Vladimiro Montesinos attempted a coup against Alberto Fujimori to install Carlos Boloña as the new president.
23	Locumbazo	October 29, 2000	Failure	Carried out in Locumba by commander Ollanta Humala and retired major Antauro Humala, who demanded the resignation of President Alberto Fujimori.
24	Andahuaylazo	January 1, 2005	Failure	Carried out by retired major Antauro Humala in Andahuaylas with 150 armed reservists, who demanded the resignation of President Alejandro Toledo.
25	2022 Peruvian self-coup	December 7, 2022	Failure	Carried out by President Pedro Castillo, who tried to dissolve Congress and other State institutions without the support of the Armed Forces or the Police. The national parliament subsequently voted to dismiss him constitutionally, which was approved by a large majority with 102 votes out of 130. Castillo was subsequently arrested for attempting to break the constitutional order.

== See also ==
- History of Peru
- List of presidents of Peru
