= List of presidents of Peru =

This is a list of those who have served as President of the Republic of Peru (head of state and head of government of Peru) from its establishment to the present. The office was established by the 1822 Constituent Congress, after the resignation of José de San Martín to his position as Protector of Peru and his subsequent departure from the country.

The first president was José de la Riva Agüero and the current officeholder is Keiko Fujimori. In the history of the position, there have been several political crises, caudillos, barracks revolt, civil wars, death of the incumbent, coups d'état, parliamentary attempts to remove the presidency, one self-coup, and vacancies dictated by the congress. The list is based on the official list of rulers by the Peruvian Congress, as well as the constitutions, laws, and decrees in each case. (Note: The official website of Congress includes a list of "presidents and rulers of the Republic" from 1821 until 2021. It lists a total of 130 governments from José de San Martín until Pedro Castillo, but does not separate constitutional presidencies from dictatorships nor interim governments. This Wikipedia list includes a total of 40 presidents and 53 presidencies from 1821 until 2021.)

Even though they were not presidents, the list includes the Libertadores San Martín and Simón Bolívar due to their historical relevance in the independence of Peru and its consolidation. The country's name was changed from "Peruvian Republic" (República peruana) to "Republic of Peru" (República del Perú) in 1980, after the 1979 constitution came into effect.

== Affiliation keys ==
Political parties:

Far-right:

- Fujimorism (Cambio 90/ Let's Go Neighbor/ Popular Force)
- Revolutionary Union (Unión Revolucionaria, UR)
- Odriist National Union (Unión Nacional Odriista, UNO)

Right wing:

- Civilista Party (Partido Civil, PC)
- Constitutional Party (Partido Constitucional)
- Reformist Democratic Party (Partido Democrático Reformista)
- Peruvian Democratic Movement (Movimiento Democrático Peruano, MDP)
- National Democratic Front (Frente Democrático Nacional)

Centre-right:

- Peruvian Aprista Party (Partido Aprista Peruano, APRA)
- Peruvians for Change (Peruanos Por el Kambio, PPK)
- Popular Action (Acción Popular, AP)
- We Are Peru (Partido Democrático Somos Perú, PDSP)

Centrist:

- Possible Peru (Perú Posible, PP)
- Purple Party (Partido Morado, PM)

Centre-left:

- Democratic Party (Partido Demócrata, PD)
- Peruvian Nationalist Party (Partido Nacionalista Peruano, PNP)

Far-left:

- Free Peru (Perú Libre, PL)

Others:

- Independent
- Military

UR (2) PC (9) C90/VV/FP (2) PC (4) PDR (1) MDP (2) PPK (1) PDSP (1) AP (4) PP (1)
PM (1) PD (2) APRA (2) FDN (1) PNP (1) PL (2) PDSP (1) Ind. (5) Military (16)

Symbols

^{†} Died in office

== List of presidents ==
=== Protectorate of Peru (1821–1822) ===
Protectorate of Peru (1821–1822)
Portrait	President (Birth–Death)	Took office	Left office	Time in office	Party	Election	Vice President
Peruvian War of Independence (1821–1826)
	José de San Martín; Protector of Peru (1778–1850)	3 August 1821	20 September 1822	1 year, 48 days	Independent	—	—

=== Presidents of the Peruvian Republic (1822–1836) ===
Peruvian Republic (1822–1836)
Portrait	President (Birth–Death)	Took office	Left office	Time in office	Party	Election	Vice President
	José de la Mar; President of the Supreme Junta (1776–1830)	21 September 1822 (Note: Some authors regard Francisco Xavier de Luna Pizarro, president of Congress, as de facto interim ruler for a single day, between San Martin's resignation and the appointment of the Supreme Junta. By this logic, Toribio Rodríguez de Mendoza should also be considered interim president, as he was chosen as temporary head of Congress during the election of their official members.)	27 February 1823 (deposed)	159 days	Independent	— (Note: Appointed by Congress)	—
	José Bernardo de Tagle; Interim Head of Government (1779–1825)	27 February 1823	28 June 1823 (deposed)	Less than 1 day	Military	—	—
	José de la Riva Agüero (1783–1858)	28 February 1823	23 June 1823 (impeached) (Note: Congress claimed that he was "willing to resign", but in fact he was forcibly removed. He continued to claim the presidency, declared the dissolution of Congress, and even allied himself with the Spanish forces to overthrow the government of Lima.)	115 days	Military	Coup d'etat	—
	Francisco Valdivieso y Prada; Interim Head of Government (1773–1829)	23 June 1823	7 August 1823	45 days	Independent	—	—
	José Bernardo de Tagle (1779–1825)	16 August 1823 (Note: José Bernardo de Tagle was already appointed "Supreme chief" by Antonio José de Sucre on 17 July 1823. This was then made official on 7 August.)	10 February 1824 (impeached)	178 days	Military	—	Diego de Aliaga y Santa Cruz
	Simón Bolívar; Dictator (Note: Supreme Political and Military Authority of the Peruvian Republic, holder of the Dictatorial Power.) (1783–1830)	10 February 1824	27 January 1827 (deposed)	2 years, 351 days	Independent	—	Office Vacant
	Andrés de Santa Cruz; President of the Council (1792–1865)	27 January 1827 (Note: Bolivar was declared deposed in an Open cabildo on 27 January 1843, after a popular uprising against his rule. Andrés de Santa Cruz had been the de facto governor of Peru in the name of Bolivar.)	9 June 1827	133 days	Independent	—	Office Vacant
First Militarism (1827–1872)
	José de La Mar (1776–1830)	9 June 1827	6 June 1829 (deposed)	1 year, 362 days	Military	1827	Manuel Salazar y Baquíjano
	Antonio Gutiérrez de la Fuente; Supreme Chief (1796–1878)	6 June 1829	31 August 1829	87 days	Military	Coup d'état	Office Vacant
	Agustín Gamarra (1785–1841)	31 August 1829	19 December 1833	4 years, 110 days	Military	—	Antonio Gutiérrez de la Fuente
	Agustín Gamarra (1785–1841)	31 August 1829	19 December 1833	4 years, 110 days	Military	1829	Antonio Gutiérrez de la Fuente
	Luis José de Orbegoso (1795–1847)	20 December 1833	4 January 1834 (deposed)	15 days	Military	— (Note: The Electoral colleges were convened for the elections of Congress and Gamarra's successor as president. However, these Colleges only met partially, and thus the elections were thwarted. Electoral Colleges were abolished in 1895.)	Office Vacant
	Pedro Pablo Bermúdez; Supreme Chief (1793–1852)	4 January 1834 (Note: Recognized in the Southern provinces; captured Orbegoso and briefly took over Lima in January 1834, but was expelled by the citizens. Continued to claim power until being betrayed by his own men, who reconciled with Orbegoso on 24 April.)	28 January 1834 (deposed)	24 days	Military	Coup d'état	Office Vacant
	Luis José de Orbegoso (1795–1847); 2nd term	29 January 1834	25 February 1835 (deposed)	1 year, 27 days	Military	Restored	Office Vacant
	Felipe Salaverry; Supreme Chief (1805–1836)	25 February 1835 (Note: Controlled Lima until 30 December 1835, when Orbegoso's troops entered the city, although infighting continued until 6 January 1836. Was defeated in the Battle of Socabaya on 7 February and executed a few days later, on 18 February.)	7 February 1836 (deposed)	347 days	Military	Coup d'état	Office Vacant
	Luis José de Orbegoso (1795–1847); 3rd term	8 January 1836	3 August 1836 (Note: Orbegoso resigned the Peruvian presidency on 3 August 1836, after promoting the creation of the Peru–Bolivian Confederation of Andrés de Santa Cruz. He had already been given the "supreme power" on 8 July 1835, dring the war against Salaverry.) (resigned)	208 days	Military	Restored	Office Vacant

=== Peru–Bolivian Confederation (1836–1839) ===
Peru–Bolivian Confederation (1836–1839)
Portrait	President (Birth–Death)	Took office	Left office	Time in office	Party	Election	Vice President
	Andrés de Santa Cruz; Supreme Protector (1792–1865)	28 October 1836 (Note: Already proclaimed Supreme Protector of South Peru (17 March) and North Peru (6 August). Ratified by the Congress of Tacna on 1 May 1837.)	20 February 1839 (resigned)	2 years, 291 days	Independent	—	Office Vacant
Republic of North Peru
	Luis José de Orbegoso; Provisory president of North Peru (1795–1847)	21 August 1837 (Note: Orbegoso declared himself independent on 30 July 1838, but was defeated three weeks later by Gamarra's restoration forces at the Battle of Portada de Guías, near Lima. Santa Cruz appointed Riva Agüero as his replacement, at Tarma.)	21 August 1838 (deposed)	1 year	Military	— (Note: Appointed by Andrés de Santa Cruz.)	Office Vacant
	José de la Riva Agüero; Provisory president of North Peru (1783–1858)	11 August 1838	24 January 1839 (resigned)	166 days	Military	—	Pedro Pablo Bermúdez
Republic of South Peru
	Ramón Herrera y Rodado; Provisory president of South Peru (1799–1882)	17 September 1837	12 October 1838	1 year, 25 days	Military	—	Office Vacant
	Pío de Tristán; Provisory president of South Peru (1773–1859)	12 October 1838	20 February 1839	131 days	Military	—	Office Vacant
Restored Peruvian Republic
	Agustín Gamarra; Self-proclaimed provisory president of Peru (1785–1841)	24 August 1838 (Note: Agustín Gamarra's forces recaptured Lima on 21 August 1838, after the Battle of Portada de Guías, but lost it a few weeks later, on 10 November. Santa Cruz was decisively defeated on 20 January 1839, at the Battle of Yungay. Lima was then occupied by the restoration forces, and the Confederation was dissolved on 20 February.)	15 August 1839	356 days	Military	Open cabildo	Office Vacant

=== Presidents of the Peruvian Republic (1840–1980) ===
Peruvian Republic (1840–1980)
Portrait	President (Birth–Death)	Took office	Left office	Time in office	Party	Election	1st Vice President	2nd Vice President
	Agustín Gamarra (1785–1841); 2nd term	15 August 1839	18 November 1841 (†) (Note: Killed during the Battle of Ingavi.)	2 years, 95 days	Military	— (Note: Appointed as provisory president by the Congress of Huancayo while the South and North republics were reunited.)	Office Vacant	
	Agustín Gamarra (1785–1841); 2nd term	15 August 1839	18 November 1841 (†)	2 years, 95 days	Military	1840	Manuel Menéndez; President of the Council of State	
— Military Anarchy —
	Manuel Menéndez; Interim Head of State (Note: As President of the Council of State of Peru in charge of the Executive.) (1793–1847)	18 November 1841	16 August 1842 (deposed)	271 days	Independent	— (Note: Constitutional succession)	Justo Figuerola; 1^{st} Vice President of the Council of State	Juan Francisco de Vidal; 2^{nd} Vice President of the Council of State
	Juan Crisóstomo Torrico; Supreme Chief (1808–1875)	16 August 1842	17 October 1842 (deposed)	62 days	Military	Coup d'état	Office Vacant	
	Juan Francisco de Vidal; Interim Head of State (1800–1863)	17 October 1842	15 March 1843	149 days	Military	Coup d'état	Office Vacant	
	Justo Figuerola; Interim Head of State (1771–1854)	15 March 1843	19 March 1843 (deposed)	4 days	Independent	—	Office Vacant	
	Manuel Ignacio de Vivanco; Supreme Director (1806–1873)	20 March 1843 (Note: Proclaimed "Supreme Director" on 28 January 1843, in the South. Vivanco's supporters deposed Figuerola in Lima, recognized Vivanco as Head of state, and installed a provisional government led by very short-lived directors: Eleuterio Aramburú (19–21 March), José Rufino Echenique (21–27 March), and Juan Antonio Pezet (27 March–7 April).)	22 July 1844 (deposed)	1 year, 125 days	Military	Coup d'état	Office Vacant	
	Domingo Nieto; President of the Provisional Junta (1803–1844)	3 September 1843 (Note: Revolted in Tacna in opposition to Vivanco.)	17 February 1844 (†) (Note: Natural causes.)	167 days	Military	Self-proclaimed	Office Vacant	
	Ramón Castilla; President of the Provisional Junta (1797–1867)	17 February 1844 (Note: De facto ruler after defeating Vivanco at the Battle of Carmen Alto.)	10 December 1844	297 days	Military	—	Office Vacant	
	Domingo Elías; Supreme Chief (1805–1867)	17 June 1844 (Note: Proclaimed himself "Supreme Chief" in Lima to restore the constitutional order, while Vivanco was outside the capital.)	10 August 1844	146 days	Independent	Coup d'état	Office Vacant	
	Justo Figuerola; Interim Head of State (1771–1854)	10 August 1844	7 October 1844	58 days	Independent	—	Office Vacant	
	Manuel Menéndez; Interim Head of State (1793–1847)	7 October 1844	20 April 1845	195 days	Independent	—	Office Vacant	
	Ramón Castilla (1797–1867)	20 April 1845	20 April 1851	6 years	Military	1845	Office Vacant	
	José Rufino Echenique (1808–1887)	20 April 1851	5 January 1855 (deposed)	3 years, 260 days	Military	1851	Office Vacant	
	Ramón Castilla (1797–1867); 2nd term	5 January 1855 (Note: Already proclaimed provisory president on 1 May 1854, in Cuzco.)	24 October 1862	7 years, 292 days	Military	Coup d'état	Juan Manuel del Mar (1858–1862)	
	Ramón Castilla (1797–1867); 2nd term	5 January 1855	24 October 1862	7 years, 292 days	Military	—	Juan Manuel del Mar (1858–1862)	
	Ramón Castilla (1797–1867); 2nd term	5 January 1855	24 October 1862	7 years, 292 days	Military	1858	Juan Manuel del Mar (1858–1862)	
	Miguel de San Román (1802–1863)	24 October 1862	3 April 1863 (†) (Note: Natural causes.)	161 days	Military	1862	Juan Antonio Pezet	Pedro Diez Canseco
	Pedro Diez Canseco; Interim Head of State (Note: As 2º Vice President in charge of the Executive.) (1815–1893)	3 April 1863 (Note: Ramón Castilla ruled as de facto interim president until Diez Canseco's arrival on 9 April.)	5 August 1863	124 days	Independent	—	Office Vacant	
	Juan Antonio Pezet (1809–1879) (Note: He is not listed in the official list of Peruvian heads of State, but he does appear as president in the list of presidential messages. Contemporary records clearly show that he was sworn as President of the Republic.)	5 August 1863	8 November 1865 (resigned)	2 years, 95 days	Military	—	Office Vacant	Pedro Diez Canseco
	Pedro Diez Canseco; Interim Head of State (1815–1893)	8 November 1865 (Note: Already proclaimed Supreme Leader on 25 June.)	28 November 1865 (deposed)	20 days	Independent	—	Office Vacant	
	Mariano Ignacio Prado; Supreme Chief (1825–1901)	28 November 1865	15 February 1867	1 year, 79 days	Military	Coup d'état	Office Vacant	
	Mariano Ignacio Prado (1825–1901) (Note: As Provisional Supreme Chief from 1865 to 1867, as Provisional President in 1867, and as constitutional President of Peru from 1867 to 1868. His first presidency is not included in the official list of Peruvian rulers. He only appears as Supreme Chief in 1865–1867, but the official list of presidential messages recognizes him as president in 1867.)	15 February 1867	7 January 1868 (resigned)	326 days	Military	1867	Luis La Puerta	
	Pedro Diez Canseco; Interim Head of State (1815–1893)	7 January 1868	31 July 1868	206 days	Military	—	Office Vacant	
	José Balta (1814–1872)	1 August 1868	22 July 1872 (deposed) (Note: Was killed on 26 July 1872 during the rebellion.)	3 years, 356 days	Military	1868	Mariano Herencia Zevallos	Francisco Diez-Canseco
	Tomás Gutiérrez; Supreme Chief (1817–1872)	22 July 1872	26 July 1872 (†) (Note: Killed by a mob.)	4 days	Military	Coup d'état	Office Vacant	
	Mariano Herencia Zevallos; Interim Head of State (Note: As 1º Vice president in charge of the Executive.) (1820–1873)	26 July 1872	2 August 1872	7 days	Civilista Party	—	Office Vacant	Francisco Diez-Canseco
First Civilism (1872–1879)
	Manuel Pardo y Lavalle (1834–1878)	2 August 1872	2 August 1876	4 years	Civilista Party	1872	Manuel Costas Arce	Francisco Garmendia
	Mariano Ignacio Prado (1825–1901); 2nd term	2 August 1876	23 December 1879 (deposed)	3 years, 143 days	Civilista Party	1876	Luis La Puerta	José Canevaro
War of the Pacific & Second Militarism (1879–1895)
	Nicolás de Piérola; Supreme Chief (1839–1913)	23 December 1879	29 July 1881	1 year, 218 days	Independent	Open cabildo	Office Vacant	
	Nicolás de Piérola; President in the South (Note: His presidency in 1881 is not included in the official list of Peruvian rulers. He only appears as Supreme Chief in 1879–1881.) (1839–1913)	29 July 1881	28 December 1881 (resigned)	152 days	Independent	— (Note: Appointed by Congress of Ayacucho)	Office Vacant	
	Francisco García Calderón; Provisory President, in Lima (1834–1905)	10 July 1881 (Note: Elected provisory president in Open cabildo on 22 February 1881, de facto since 12 March.)	6 November 1881 (prisoner of war)	119 days	Independent	— (Note: Appointed by Congress of Chorrillos)	Lizardo Montero	Andrés Avelino Cáceres
	Lizardo Montero; Interim Head, in Ayacucho (1832–1905)	6 November 1881	28 October 1882 (resigned)	1 year, 356 days	Civilista Party	—	Office Vacant	
	Miguel Iglesias; Regenerator president, in the North (1830–1909)	30 December 1882	1 March 1884	1 year, 62 days	Military	— (Note: Appointed by the North Assembly)	Office Vacant	
	Miguel Iglesias (1830–1909)	1 March 1884	3 December 1885 (resigned)	1 year, 277 days	Military	—	Office Vacant	
	Antonio Arenas; Interim Head of State (1808–1891)	3 December 1885	3 June 1886	182 days	Independent	—	Office Vacant	
	Andrés Avelino Cáceres (1836–1923)	3 June 1886	10 August 1890	4 years, 68 days	Constitutional Party	1886 (Note: His party was the only candidate.)	Remigio Morales Bermúdez	Aurelio Denegri
	Remigio Morales Bermúdez (1836–1894)	10 August 1890	1 April 1894 (†) (Note: Natural causes.)	3 years, 234 days	Constitutional Party	1890	Pedro Alejandrino del Solar	Justiniano Borgoño
	Justiniano Borgoño; Interim Head of State (1836–1921)	1 April 1894	10 August 1894	131 days	Constitutional Party	—	Office Vacant	
	Andrés Avelino Cáceres (1836–1923); 2nd term	10 August 1894	20 March 1895 (resigned)	222 days	Constitutional Party	1894	César Canevaro	Cesáreo Chacaltana
	Manuel Candamo; President of the Provisional Junta (1841–1904)	20 March 1895	8 September 1895	172 days	Independent	—	Office Vacant	
Second Civilism (1895–1914)
	Nicolás de Piérola (1839–1913); 2nd term	8 September 1895	8 September 1899	4 years	Democratic Party	1895	Guillermo Billinghurst	Augusto Seminario
	Eduardo López de Romaña (1847–1912)	8 September 1899	8 September 1903	4 years	Civilista Party	1899	Isaac Alzamora	Federico Bresani
	Manuel Candamo (1841–1904)	8 September 1903	7 May 1904 (†) (Note: Natural causes.)	242 days	Civilista Party	1903	Office Vacant (Note: Lino Alarco Brediñana was elected to the office, but died before the inauguration.)	Serapio Calderón
	Serapio Calderón; Interim Head of State (1843–1922)	7 May 1904	24 September 1904	140 days	Civilista Party	—	Office Vacant	
	José Pardo y Barreda (1864–1947)	24 September 1904	24 September 1908	4 years	Civilista Party	1904	José Cavero	Office Vacant
	Augusto Leguía (1863–1932)	24 September 1908	24 September 1912	4 years	Civilista Party	1908	Eugenio Larrabure	Belisario Sosa
	Guillermo Billinghurst (1851–1915)	24 September 1912	4 February 1914 (deposed)	1 year, 133 days	Democratic Party	1912	Roberto Leguía	Miguel Echenique
New Militarism (1914–1980) (Note: Between 1915 and 1980, all constitutional governments were overthrown by coups before completing their terms, with the sole exception of Manuel Prado Ugarteche's first term, which came to power with support of Óscar Benavides military junta.)
	Óscar Benavides; President of the Military Junta (1876–1945)	4 February 1914	15 May 1914	100 days	Military	Coup d'état	Office Vacant	
	Óscar Benavides (1876–1945)	15 May 1914	18 August 1915	1 year, 95 days	Military	—	Office Vacant	
	José Pardo y Barreda (1864–1947); 2nd term	18 August 1915	4 July 1919 (deposed)	3 years, 320 days	Civilista Party	1915	Ricardo Bentín Sánchez	Melitón Carvajal
	Augusto Leguía (1863–1932); 2nd term	4 July 1919	25 August 1930 (deposed)	11 years, 52 days	Reformist Democratic Party	1919 (Note: The 1919 elections, held on May 18, resulted in a clear victory for Leguía, but the Supreme Tribunal denounced several irregularities by almost all parties. Leguía secured his victory through a coup two months later, on July 4. The election results, and Leguía's position, were ratified by Congress on October 12.)	César Canevaro (1919–1920)	Agustín de la Torre (1919–1920)
	Augusto Leguía (1863–1932); 2nd term	4 July 1919	25 August 1930 (deposed)	11 years, 52 days	Reformist Democratic Party	Coup d'état	César Canevaro (1919–1920)	Agustín de la Torre (1919–1920)
	Augusto Leguía (1863–1932); 2nd term	4 July 1919	25 August 1930 (deposed)	11 years, 52 days	Reformist Democratic Party	1924	César Canevaro (1919–1920)	Agustín de la Torre (1919–1920)
	Augusto Leguía (1863–1932); 2nd term	4 July 1919	25 August 1930 (deposed)	11 years, 52 days	Reformist Democratic Party	1929	César Canevaro (1919–1920)	Agustín de la Torre (1919–1920)
	Manuel María Ponce; President of the Military Junta (1874–1966)	25 August 1930	27 August 1930 (deposed)	2 days	Military	Coup d'état	Office Vacant	
	Luis Miguel Sánchez Cerro; President of the Military Junta (1889–1933)	27 August 1930	1 March 1931	186 days	Military	Coup d'état	Office Vacant	
	Mariano Holguín; President of the Assembly (1874–1951)	1 March 1931	1 March 1931	6 hours (Note: Between 3 p.m. and 9 p.m.)	Independent	— (Note: Appointed by Military Junta)	Office Vacant	
	Ricardo Leoncio Elías Arias; President of the Military Junta (1874–1951)	1 March 1931	5 March 1931	4 days	Independent	—	Office Vacant	
	Gustavo Jiménez; President of the Military Junta (1886–1933)	5 March 1931	11 March 1931	6 days	Independent	—	Office Vacant	
	David Samanez Ocampo; President of the Military Junta (1866–1947)	11 March 1931	8 December 1931	272 days	Democratic Party	—	Office Vacant	
	Luis Miguel Sánchez Cerro (1889–1933)	8 December 1931	30 April 1933 (†) (Note: Assasinated.)	1 year, 143 days	Revolutionary Union	1931	Office Vacant	
	Óscar Benavides (1876–1945); 2nd term	30 April 1933	8 December 1939	6 years, 222 days	Military	—	Ernesto Montagne Markholz (1936–1939)	Antonio Rodríguez Ramírez (1936–1939)
	Manuel Prado Ugarteche (1889–1967)	8 December 1939	28 July 1945	5 years, 232 days	Peruvian Democratic Movement	1939 (Note: Electoral fraud.)	Rafael Larco Herrera	Carlos Gibson
	José Luis Bustamante y Rivero (1894–1989)	28 July 1945	29 October 1948 (deposed)	3 years, 93 days	National Democratic Front	1945	José Gálvez Barrenechea	Eduardo Ganoza
	Manuel Odría; President of the Military Junta (1896–1974)	29 October 1948	1 June 1950	1 year, 215 days	Military	Coup d'état	Zenón Noriega	Office Vacant
	Zenón Noriega; President of the Military Junta (1889–1967) (Note: De jure figurehead, de facto leadership by Manuel Odría, who resigned in order to participate in the 1950 elections, in which he was the only candidate.)	1 June 1950	28 July 1950	57 days	Military	—	Office Vacant	
	Manuel Odría (1896–1974)	28 July 1950	28 July 1956	6 years	Odriist National Union	1950	Héctor Boza	Federico Bolognesi
	Manuel Prado Ugarteche (1889–1967); 2nd term	28 July 1956	18 July 1962 (deposed)	5 years, 355 days	Peruvian Democratic Movement	1956	Luis Gallo Porras	Carlos Moreyra
	Ricardo Pérez Godoy; President of the Military Junta (1905–1982)	18 July 1962	3 March 1963	228 days	Military	Coup d'état	Nicolás Lindley López	Office Vacant
	Nicolás Lindley López; President of the Military Junta (1908–1995)	3 March 1963	28 July 1963	147 days	Military	—	Pedro Vargas Prada	Office Vacant
	Fernando Belaúnde Terry (1912–2002); 1st term	28 July 1963	3 October 1968 (deposed)	5 years, 67 days	Popular Action	1963	Edgardo Seoane	Mario Polar Ugarteche
	Juan Velasco Alvarado (1910–1977)	3 October 1968	29 August 1975 (deposed)	6 years, 330 days	Military	Coup d'état	Edgardo Mercado Jarrín	Office Vacant
	Francisco Morales Bermúdez (1921–2022)	30 August 1975	28 July 1980	4 years, 333 days	Military	Coup d'état	Pedro Richter Prada	Office Vacant

=== Presidents of the Republic of Peru (1980–present) ===
Republic of Peru (1980–present)
Portrait	President (Birth–Death)	Took office	Left office	Time in office	Party	Election	1st Vice President	2nd Vice President
	Fernando Belaúnde Terry (1912–2002); 2nd term	28 July 1980	28 July 1985	5 years	Popular Action	1980	Fernando Schwalb	Javier Alva Orlandini
	Alan García (1949–2019); 1st term	28 July 1985	28 July 1990	5 years	Peruvian Aprista Party	1985	Luis Alberto Sánchez	Luis Alva Castro
	Alberto Fujimori (1938–2024) (Note: De jure figurehead, de facto leadership by Vladimiro Montesinos.) (Note: As President of the Government of Emergency and National Reconstruction of Peru from 5 April 1992 until 5 January 1993.)	28 July 1990	21 November 2000 (impeached) (Note: On 13 November 2000, Fujimori left the country to attend a regional summit amid controversy over the results of the previous election. On 17 November, he submitted his resignation via fax, which the Congress rejected in favor of impeachment on the grounds that he was "permanently morally disabled".)	10 years, 116 days	Cambio 90 (1990–1992); Cambio 90 – New Majority (1992–1999); Peru 2000 (1999–2000)	1990	Máximo San Román (1990–1992); Ricardo Márquez Flores (1995–2000); Francisco Tudela (Jul–Nov 2000)	Carlos García y García (1990–1992); César Paredes Canto (1995–2000); Ricardo Márquez Flores (Jul–Nov 2000)
	Alberto Fujimori (1938–2024)	28 July 1990	21 November 2000 (impeached)	10 years, 116 days	Cambio 90 (1990–1992); Cambio 90 – New Majority (1992–1999); Peru 2000 (1999–2000)	Self-coup	Máximo San Román (1990–1992); Ricardo Márquez Flores (1995–2000); Francisco Tudela (Jul–Nov 2000)	Carlos García y García (1990–1992); César Paredes Canto (1995–2000); Ricardo Márquez Flores (Jul–Nov 2000)
	Alberto Fujimori (1938–2024)	28 July 1990	21 November 2000 (impeached)	10 years, 116 days	Cambio 90 (1990–1992); Cambio 90 – New Majority (1992–1999); Peru 2000 (1999–2000)	1995	Máximo San Román (1990–1992); Ricardo Márquez Flores (1995–2000); Francisco Tudela (Jul–Nov 2000)	Carlos García y García (1990–1992); César Paredes Canto (1995–2000); Ricardo Márquez Flores (Jul–Nov 2000)
	Alberto Fujimori (1938–2024)	28 July 1990	21 November 2000 (impeached)	10 years, 116 days	Cambio 90 (1990–1992); Cambio 90 – New Majority (1992–1999); Peru 2000 (1999–2000)	2000 (Note: Electoral fraud. The results were annulled and new elections were called for April 2001.)	Máximo San Román (1990–1992); Ricardo Márquez Flores (1995–2000); Francisco Tudela (Jul–Nov 2000)	Carlos García y García (1990–1992); César Paredes Canto (1995–2000); Ricardo Márquez Flores (Jul–Nov 2000)
	Valentín Paniagua (1936–2006)	22 November 2000	28 July 2001	248 days	Popular Action	— (Note: Succeeded to the presidency as President of Congress.)	Office Vacant	
	Alejandro Toledo (born 1946)	28 July 2001	28 July 2006	5 years	Possible Peru	2001	Raúl Diez-Canseco (2001–2004)	David Waisman
	Alan García (1949–2019); 2nd term	28 July 2006	28 July 2011	5 years	Peruvian Aprista Party	2006	Luis Giampietri	Lourdes Mendoza
	Ollanta Humala (born 1962); Presidency	28 July 2011	28 July 2016	5 years	Peruvian Nationalist Party	2011	Marisol Espinoza	Omar Chehade (2011–2012)
	Pedro Pablo Kuczynski (born 1938); Presidency	28 July 2016	23 March 2018 (resigned)	1 year, 238 days	Peruvians for Change	2016	Martín Vizcarra	Mercedes Aráoz
	Martín Vizcarra (born 1963); Presidency	23 March 2018	9 November 2020 (impeached)	2 years, 231 days	Independent	—	Office Vacant	Mercedes Aráoz (2018–2020)
	Manuel Merino (born 1961)	10 November 2020	15 November 2020 (resigned)	5 days	Popular Action	—	Office Vacant	
	Francisco Sagasti (born 1944); Presidency	17 November 2020	28 July 2021	253 days	Purple Party	—	Office Vacant	
	Pedro Castillo (born 1969); Presidency	28 July 2021	7 December 2022 (impeached)	1 year, 132 days	Free Peru	2021	Dina Boluarte	Office Vacant (Note: Vladimir Cerrón ran on the Castillo ticket, but the National Jury of Elections disqualified him from the office due to previous corruption charges.)
	Dina Boluarte (born 1962); Presidency	7 December 2022	10 October 2025 (impeached)	2 years, 307 days	Independent	—	Office Vacant	
	José Jerí (born 1986); Presidency	10 October 2025	17 February 2026 (censured (Note: Jerí served as President of the Republic in virtue of his position as President of Congress. The legislature successfully voted to remove him from the latter, thus also ending his presidency.))	130 days	We Are Peru	—	Office Vacant	
	José María Balcázar (born 1943); Presidency	18 February 2026	28 July 2026	160 days	Independent	—	Office Vacant	
	Keiko Fujimori (born 1975); Presidency	28 July 2026	Incumbent	108 days	Popular Force	2026	Luis Galarreta	Miki Torres

== Addendum ==
Those who are mentioned in the following list were sworn in as interim presidents of Peru, because of a political crisis. However, they never came to govern.

President (Birth–Death)		Took office	Left office	Time in office	Party	Form of entry	Vice President
—	Carlos García y García (1927–2016); Interim President	5 April 1992	20 April 1992	15 days	Cambio 90	Constitutional succession (Second Vice President)	Office Vacant
	Máximo San Román (born 1946); Interim President	21 April 1992	5 January 1993 (Note: Date of the inauguration of the Democratic Constituent Congress that ratified Fujimori as president.)	259 days	Cambio 90	Constitutional succession (First Vice President)	Carlos García y García
	Mercedes Aráoz (born 1961); Interim President	30 September 2019	1 October 2019	1 day	Independent	Constitutional succession (Second Vice President)	Office Vacant

== See also ==
- President of Peru
- Vice President of Peru
- Prime Minister of Peru
- Constitution of Peru
- Politics of Peru
- Viceroyalty of Peru
- List of viceroys of Peru
- List of Peruvian coups d'état

== Sources ==
- Basadre, Jorge (2014). Historia de la República del Perú (in Spanish). Producciones Cantabria S.A.C. ISBN 978-612-306-353-5.
- Congress of Peru (2026). "Mensajes presidenciales y otros documentos para la historia política del Perú". Oficina de Participación Ciudadana. Archived from the original on 10 February 2026.
- Congress of Peru (2021a). "Presidentes y Gobernantes de la República del Perú 1821-1850". Library of Congress of Peru. Archived from the original on 8 August 2024.
- Congress of Peru (2021b). "Presidentes y Gobernantes de la República del Perú 1850-1900". Library of Congress of Peru. Archived from the original on 24 February 2026.
- Congress of Peru (2021c). "Presidentes y Gobernantes de la República del Perú 1900-1950". Library of Congress of Peru. Archived from the original on 29 July 2021.
- Congress of Peru (2021d). "Presidentes y Gobernantes de la República del Perú 1950-2000". Library of Congress of Peru. Archived from the original on 24 June 2021.
- Congress of Peru (2021e). "Presidentes y Gobernantes de la República del Perú 2000-2021". Library of Congress of Peru. Archived from the original on 19 June 2021.
