= Peruvian Civil War of 1843–1844 =

Civil war in Peru

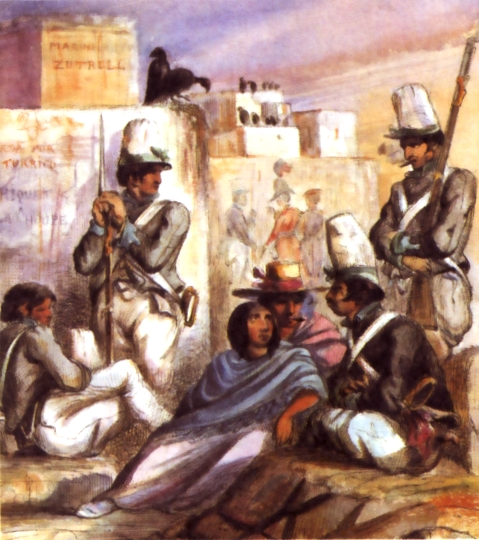
- Militia during the conflict
Date	1843–1844
Location	Peru
Result	Revolutionary victory

Belligerents
(Peru) Directoriales (government)	(Peru) Provisional Junta (constitutionalists)

Commanders and leaders
(Peru) Manuel Ignacio de Vivanco (Peru) Juan Francisco Balta (Peru) José Rufino Echenique	(Peru) Domingo Nieto # (Peru) Ramón Castilla (Peru) Manuel de Mendiburu (Peru) Miguel de San Román (Peru) Domingo Elías

The Peruvian Civil War of 1843–1844 was the second internal conflict in 19th century Peru (after the Peruvian Civil War of 1834). It was fought between the government forces of Vivanco and Echenique against the revolutionaries led by Domingo Nieto and Ramon Castilla. A battle was fought at Pachia in Tacna on August 29, 1843. A clash occurred at San Antonio, Moquegua on October 27, 1843. Domingo Nieto died on February 17, 1844. From June 17 to June 29, 1844, fighting occurred in the capital Lima between the government and supporters of Domingo Elías. A final clash occurred at Carmen Alto on July 22, 1844.

== Background ==
After the death of the Peruvian president Agustín Gamarra during the war with Bolivia in 1841, the president of the Council of State, Manuel Menéndez, assumed power. After containing the Bolivian invasion of southern Peru and signing peace with the neighboring country, Menéndez ended up being overthrown. Peru was then plunged into a period later known as the military anarchy, where several generals vied for power. After successive coups, Juan Crisóstomo Torrico, Juan Francisco de Vidal and Manuel Ignacio de Vivanco came to power. The latter established an authoritarian and conservative government, which he called the Directory (Spanish: el Directorio).

== Tacna Uprising ==
Generals Domingo Nieto, Ramón Castilla and Manuel de Mendiburu set out to end Vivanco's de facto government and restore legitimate authority, that is, that of Menéndez. As its goal was to restore the Constitution of 1839, the uprising was called the "Constitutional Revolution", the same one that began in Tacna on May 17, 1843. Militias were organized in Tacna and Moquegua, to support the revolution, with some units of the regular army joining it.

Vivanco sent a division to the south of Peru under the command of his war minister, General Manuel de la Guarda, to strengthen the garrisons that already existed in that area, with the slogan of putting an end to the "factious" without hesitation. Guarda landed on Islay and marched to Arequipa, where he joined the forces of General Fermín del Castillo. Before continuing the march towards Tacna, both were in charge of subduing the generals Juan Crisóstomo Torrico and Miguel de San Román, who had risen up in Puno. Once the capitulation was signed, Torrico and San Román went to Bolivia. Vivanco was irritated upon hearing this news, harshly reprimanding Guarda for not having captured and shot the rebels.

== Battles of Pachía and San Antonio ==
With the rebels in Puno having been dispersed, the leadership's troops advanced on Tacna. Nieto and Castilla, at the head of rebel militiamen from Tacna and Moquegua, lured Colonel Juan Francisco Balta, a Vivanquista chief who with a small detachment had moved away from the bulk of his army. Thus, the battle of Pachía, near Tacna, was fought on August 29, 1843. Nieto attacked Balta, but then pretended to withdraw to attract the opposing cavalry and his leader to a place distant from his infantry. Balta fell into the trap, which Castilla took advantage of to attack the enemy infantry and take up positions in a cemetery. Upon Balta's return, he received the closed volleys of the Castilla riflemen, while Nieto, leaving the farce of withdrawing from him, counterattacked from behind him. The skillful maneuver determined the defeat of Balta, who lost more than 500 men, including soldiers and officers.

The forces of Guarda and Castillo remained standing, numbering about 3,200 men. They met the forces of Nieto and Castilla on October 27, 1843, near Moquegua. The battle, known as the battle of San Antonio, began on the heights of Tumilaca, and the constitutionalists forced their opponents to spend the night without water and on their weapons. At dawn the next day, Guarda had his troops camp near a stream. Attentive to this movement, Castilla advanced completely alone to the enemy camp and entered the tent of Guarda, to whom he offered to capitulate (which was only a simulation). After agreeing on the terms of the capitulation, Castile suggested to Guarda that he rest his troops so they could go drink at the stream. Castilla himself, leaving the store, addressed these troops and in a stentorian voice ordered them: "Battalion: set up pavilions and get out of the water." The Guarda soldiers obeyed, as if they had listened to their own boss. It was then the opportune moment for the Castilian soldiers to enter into action, who, advancing at a trot, surrounded Guarda's tent, while Castilla entered and took the Vivanquist chief by the arm, telling him: "You are my prisoner." The soldiers of Guarda, since they were unarmed, were easily taken prisoner. This was a great victory for the constitutionalists, who, mostly militiamen, subdued an army of experienced soldiers, superior in number. As a consequence of this victory, the rebellion advanced to Puno, Cuzco and Andahuaylas, thus consolidating itself throughout southern Peru, with the exception of Arequipa, which remained unwavering in its loyalty to Vivanco.

== The Provisional Government Junta ==
On September 3, 1843, the revolutionaries constituted a Provisional Government Junta of the Free Departments in Cuzco (Spanish: Junta de Gobierno Provisional de los Departamentos Libres), whose presidency was assumed by Domingo Nieto. It was made up of General Ramón Castilla, Colonel Pedro Cisneros, Dr. José M., Coronel Zegarra, and National Guard Colonel Nicolás Jacinto Chocano. The secretary and substitute member was Colonel José Félix Iguaín. The representative figure of the revolutionaries was Marshal Nieto, who was nicknamed the "Quixote of the Law" (Spanish: El Quijote de la Ley) and the "Greco-Roman Marshal" (Spanish: Mariscal greco-romano), for his adherence to the laws and for his vast culture. But he fell ill and died on February 17, 1844, a victim of liver disease. As such a death occurred unexpectedly, since Nieto was barely 40 years old, there were those who suspected possible poisoning. Castilla replaced Nieto in the presidency of the Junta, thus going on to lead the revolution. Vivanco, seeing that his situation was getting complicated, marched towards Arequipa, where he had massive support.

== The Semana Magna ==
Another episode of the war was the so-called Magna Week (Spanish: Semana Magna) in Lima. It all started when the prefect Domingo Elías, until then loyal to Vivanco, taking advantage of his departure, rose up against the Directorial government and proclaimed himself Political and Military Chief of the Republic on June 17, 1844. Immediately afterwards, Elías organized the defense of the capital against the threat of the vivanquista forces commanded by José Rufino Echenique, who were advancing from the central Sierra. All of Lima mobilized to defend itself, but after a week of tense waiting, the attack did not take place because Echenique, according to what he says in his memoirs, was informed by Felipe Pardo y Aliaga that Vivanco and Castilla were preparing for a final battle near Arequipa, rendering an attack on Lima meaningless. Thus ended the Magna Week, an episode remembered as an expression of weariness or disgust of the population of Lima in the face of militarism.

== Arequipa Resistance ==
Vivanco, who was indeed in Arequipa, wanted to resign when he heard the news of Elías's defection. But before the pleas of the Arequipa crowd he gave up. Arequipa was very devoted to his cause and prepared to resist the attack of Castilla.

Castilla, reinforced with the forces of Miguel de San Román, besieged Arequipa, with both parties exchanging fire for 16 days. Later, on the night of July 21, 1844, Castilla took the offensive and advanced on Vivanco's right flank, dawning on Acequia Alta or Carmen Alto.

Vivanco, who was preceded by several parties of montoneros, positioned himself in the town of Cayma and established his defense line there, yielding the initiative to the enemy in this part.

== Battle of Carmen Alto ==
Battle of Carmen Alto
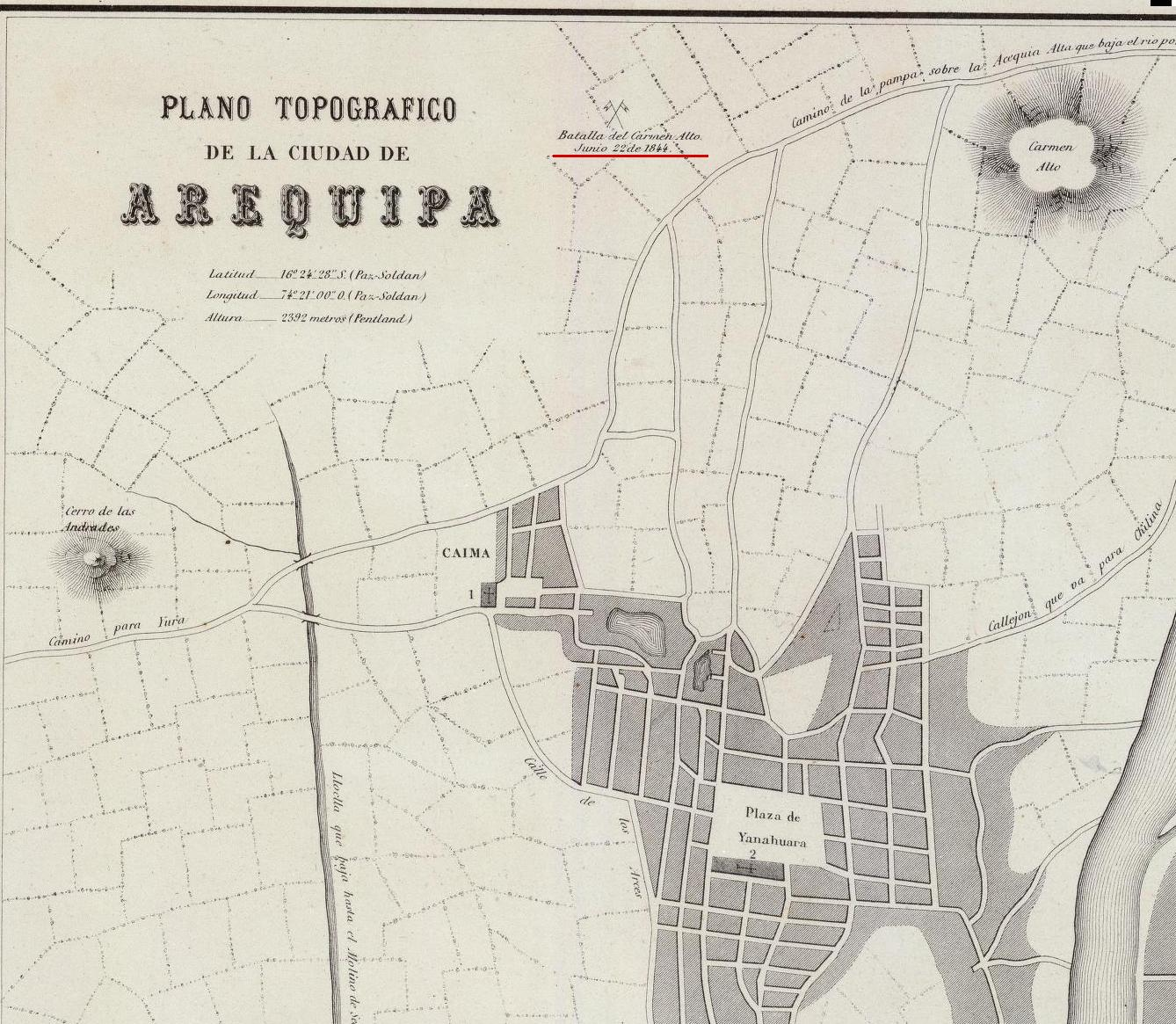
- 1865 map highlighting the location of the battle
Date	22 July 1844
Location	Carmen Alto, Arequipa, Peru
Result	Revolutionary victory

Belligerents
(Peru) Directoriales	(Peru) Provisional Junta

Commanders and leaders
(Peru) Manuel Ignacio de Vivanco	(Peru) Ramón Castilla

In Carmen Alto, a small town surrounded by a plain located between Cayma and Yanahuara, the army of Castilla was deployed, sheltered by the irregularities of the terrain, and waited for the attack of its adversaries. Castilla assumed command of his troops and appointed General Miguel de San Román as General-in-Chief and General Isidro Frisancho as Chief of Staff.

Dean Juan Gualberto Valdivia, historian of the revolutions of Arequipa, tells an anecdote about this battle: he states that Vivanco, at the time the fight broke out, was busy trying to decipher the inscription of the year in which the bell of Cayma church, a monument of historical value, had been established. During that time he suffered the defeat of Carmen Alto and thus lost power. But more credible is the vivanquista version, which maintains that Vivanco was in the bell tower of that church to observe the field of operations and that he had arranged for the battle to be fought the next day, but the imprudence of one of his officers precipitated the struggle.

Indeed, on July 22, 1844, Vivanco ordered his lieutenants Juan Antonio Pezet, Ríos and Lopera to place the troops in apparent positions to present the battle on July 23, the next day. But Lopera exceeded the limits in carrying out the orders and with the first body he moved, he began the attack on the enemy line. When Vivanco and other chiefs who were with him in the distance noticed the battle that was taking place, they decided to march to the battle scene, but it was already too late: their battalions had been destroyed. Pezet himself was seriously injured. At sunset, Vivanco ordered his surviving troops to leave the field. Castilla called off the pursuit at seven o'clock at night and his army concentrated in Challapampa, where he waited for dawn to enter the city.

The next morning, Castilla entered the city and sent Dr. Juan Manuel Polar y Carasas to deal with Vivanco, offering him guarantees. Vivanco, who had placed his troops in the Apacheta cemetery, refused everything. And in the evening of that same day he set off at full gallop for the port of Islay where he embarked on a merchant steamer. He arrived in Callao on July 27, being arrested by Domingo Elías and exiled to Chile a few days later. Shortly before, the squad had joined the winning side.

Castilla was magnanimous with the defeated and did not apply any repression. The people of Arequipa, who had fervently supported Vivanco (as they would also in the civil war of 1856–1858), accepted the new order of things, given that their leader showed no interest in continuing the fight and rather fled, abandoning his troops.

== Aftermath ==
Victorious on the battlefield, Castilla complied with reestablishing the Constitution of 1839. Consequently, and after a brief interim period of Justo Figuerola, the President of the Council of State Manuel Menéndez resumed supreme command on October 7, 1844, with the mission of carrying out the constitutional transfer of power.

Menéndez complied with calling general elections. The winner was Castilla, who assumed power on April 20, 1845. This first government of Castilla (1845-1851), meant the beginning of a stage of institutional calm and the organization of the Peruvian State, after two decades of internal conflict.

== Bibliography ==
- Basadre Grohmann, Jorge: Historia de la República del Perú (1822 - 1933), Tomo 4. Editada por la Empresa Editora El Comercio S. A. Lima, 2005. ISBN 9972-205-66-5 (V.4)
- Chirinos Soto, Enrique: Historia de la República (1821-1930). Tomo I. Lima, AFA Editores Importadores S.A., 1985.
- Vargas Ugarte, Rubén: Historia General del Perú. Tomo VIII. La República (1833-1843). Primera Edición. Editor Carlos Milla Batres. Lima, Perú, 1971.
- Varios autores: Historia general de los peruanos. (Hasta 1973). Tomo 3. El Perú, primera independencia nacional y revolución peruana. Publicada bajo el auspicio del Gobierno Revolucionario de las Fuerzas Armadas. Impreso en los Talleres Gráficos de Iberia S.A. Lima, 1973.
