= Library of Congress (disambiguation) =

The Library of Congress is the research library that officially serves the United States Congress and is the de facto national library of the United States.

Library of Congress may also refer to:

- Library of Congress (film), a 1945 documentary film about the Library of Congress
- Law Library of Congress, the law library of the United States Congress
- Library of Congress Building, a building in Washington, D.C. and former location of the Library of Congress, now called the Thomas Jefferson Building
- Library of Congress of Chile, a library in Santiago, Chile
- Library of the Congress of Mexico, a library containing records of Mexico's legislative sessions
- Library of Congress of Peru, a library in Lima, Peru
- Library of the Congress of the Republic of Colombia, a library in the Republic of Columbia
- Library of Congress Classification, a system of library classification developed by the Library of Congress

== See also ==
- Librarian of Congress
- List of national and state libraries
