= Pedro Diez Canseco =

President of Peru variously in the 1860s

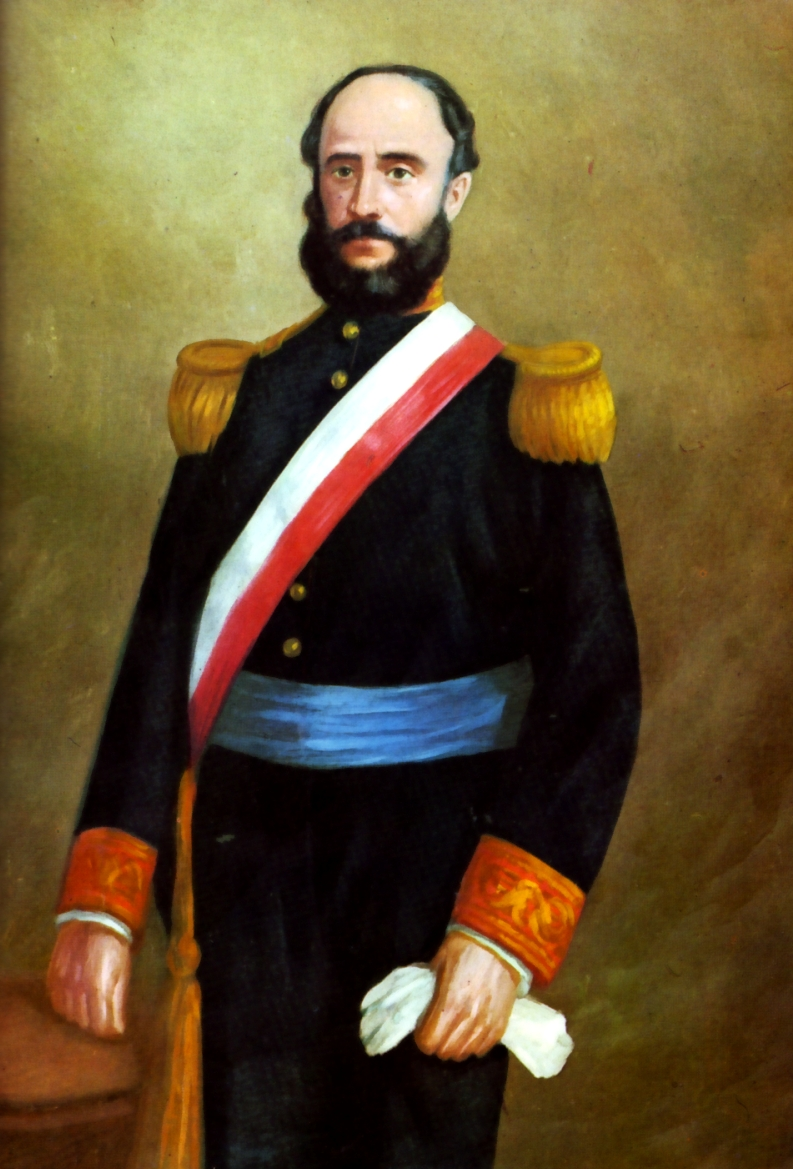

Interim President of Peru
- In office April 9, 1863 – August 5, 1863
- Prime Minister: Juan Antonio Pezet
- Vice President: Juan Antonio Pezet; Pedro Diez Canseco
- Preceded by: Ramón Castilla
- Succeeded by: Juan Antonio Pezet
- In office January 7, 1868 – August 2, 1868
- Prime Minister: Antonio Arenas
- Preceded by: Mariano Ignacio Prado
- Succeeded by: José Balta
- In office November 8, 1865 – November 28, 1865
- Prime Minister: Mariano Ignacio Prado
- Preceded by: Juan Antonio Pezet
- Succeeded by: Mariano Ignacio Prado

Personal details
- Born: January 31, 1815
- Died: April 3, 1893 (aged 78)
- Party: Independent (Conservative)
- Other political affiliations: Pro-Gamarra

Pedro Diez Canseco Corbacho (January 31, 1815 in Arequipa, Viceroyalty of Peru – April 3, 1893 in Chorrillos, Peru) was a Peruvian soldier and politician who served as interim President of Peru in 1863, 1868 and 1865. He served as the second vice president from October 1862 to 1863. He was the brother of Francisco Diez Canseco, and a great-grandfather of Fernando Belaunde Terry.

== See also ==
- List of presidents of Peru

Political offices
Preceded by Ramón Castilla	Interim President of Peru; 1863	Succeeded by Juan Antonio Pezet
Preceded by Juan Antonio Pezet	Interim President of Peru; 1865	Succeeded by Mariano Ignacio Prado
Preceded by Mariano Ignacio Prado	Interim President of Peru; 1868	Succeeded by José Balta
