= José María Valle Riestra =

Peruvian composer

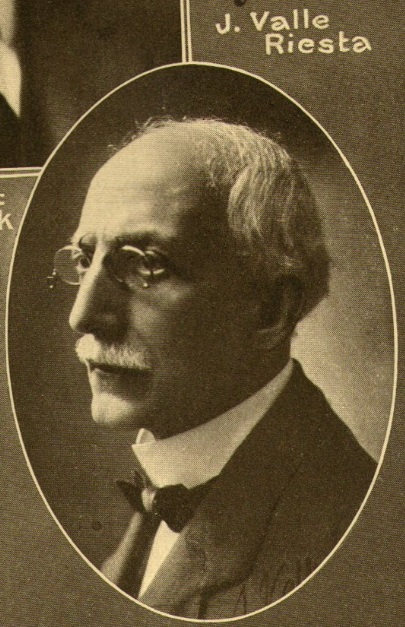
Portrait of José María Valle Riestra

José María Valle Riestra (November 9, 1859 - January 25, 1925) was a Peruvian composer.

A native of Lima, Valle Riestra studied in London in childhood; returning to Lima, he continued self-study in music. In adulthood he went to Paris for further study, working from 1895 until 1897 with André Gedalge. Upon the organization of the Academia Nacional de Música he was appointed to the faculty. His compositions were national in character; some employed Inca melodies. They included three operas on Inca themes, including Ollanta (1900); Las rosas de Jamaica; and Atahualpa. Other works include a requiem for chorus and orchestra; orchestral works; choral music; and songs. He died in the city of his birth. By marriage he was related to Juan Antonio Pezet, dedicatee of his requiem.
