= Recapture of Tarapacá =

Siege of San Lorenzo de Tarapacá
- Part of Peruvian counter-offensive campaign in the Peruvian-Boliivan War
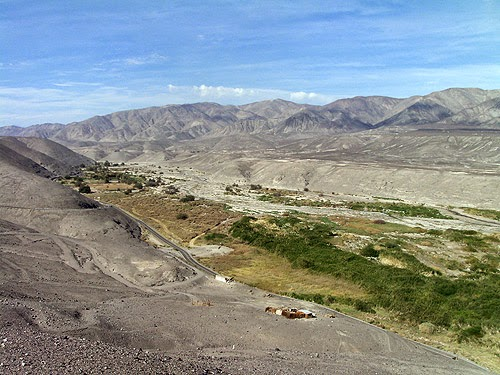
- Current image of the place of confrontation between the Peruvian and Bolivian squads in January 1842.
Date	January 6 and 7, 1842
Location	Tarapacá, Peru
Result	Peruvian victory; Peru takes control of Tarapacá.

Belligerents
Peru	Bolivia

Commanders and leaders
(Peru) Juan Buendía	(Bolivia) José María García † (Bolivia) Juan Montero † (Bolivia) Hilarón Ortiz (POW) (executed)

Strength
155 men	105 men

Casualties and losses
1 killed 5 wounded	110 killed & captured

The recapture of Tarapacá or siege of Tarapacá was a confrontation between Bolivian occupation forces under the command of Colonel José María García and Peruvian militias under the command of Major Juan Buendía within the framework of the War between Peru and Bolivia between January 6 and 7, 1842. Peruvian victory allowed us to recover the province of Tarapacá, which had been captured by Bolivian troops days before.

== Background ==
In 1841, the president of Peru, Agustín Gamarra, attempted to annex Bolivia (colonial Upper Peru), an undertaking that cost him his life by Peruvian Army on November 18 of that same year in the Battle of Ingavi. The Bolivian army under the command of General José Ballivián invades Peru, occupying Moquegua and Puno and immediately sending Col. Rodríguez Magariños, chief of the second Bolivian division to occupy Tacna and Arica, which said Bolivian chief carried out in December 1841. On January 2 of the following year, a column of one hundred Bolivian soldiers, under the command of Colonel José María García and his second, Commander Juan Montero, 3 occupies the town of Tarapacá, converting the Cabildo house into barracks for his troops, the Peruvian sub-prefect Calixto Gutiérrez de La Fuente retires to Iquique carrying the news of the occupation of the Bolivian troops. In said city he contacted Major Juan Buendía y Noriega who organized a column of militiamen with the residents of the port of Iquique and emigrants from Tacna, thus setting off for Tarapacá on January 5, 1842.

== Battle ==
Once the forces were recomposed, Major Juan Buendía left Iquique with a column of volunteers towards Tarapacá, fighting on the night of January 6 with the help of residents of the provincial capital, a fight that lasted until seven in the morning on next day. However, what actually happened is that Buendía, before starting a fight, settled in the La Peña nitrate office, following to the letter the strategy designed by the subprefect, apparently days before the invasion. In this nitrate mine he not only gathered men and weapons, but on January 4 and 5 he dispatched armed groups to harass the occupation forces day and night. This procedure aimed at weakening the invading forces was so successful that the Bolivian colonel José María García asked his superiors to send infantry and cavalry troops in order to confront them:

"Se hallan mucho dispersos y los va reuniendo el comandante Juan D. Buendía a distancia de catorce leguas llamada La Peña, y este señor van dos noches que me tiene abrumado con sus tiros, con los doce de caballería que tiene, y como están bien montados no les puedo hacer nada, y si tuviese ya la mitad de la caballería, podría tomarlos como también toda la caballada; pues con los que tengo no puedo perseguirlos una sola cuadra porque en su vida han manejado el arma, y quizás los más de ellos no la han conocido. Esto es que me hallo con hombres armados y en inacción".

Atte. Cnel. José María García. (El Comercio, 22/01/1842, page 4)".

Thus, the date and time chosen to repel the invaders was due to intelligently articulated planning a Bolivian troop without sleep for two nights in a row, also without rest and poorly fed for the same period. The account of the combat by Juan Buendía himself was issued in the following terms:

A mi aproximación a Tarapacá, se me reunió bastante gente aunque con pocas armas. Ello es que el 6 a las 11 de la noche estuve frente al enemigo que ocupaba una posición casi inexpugnable; favorecido de la cual me rompió un vivo fuego que fue contestado por los nuestros con no menor ardor por lo que al poco rato me encontré sin municiones, mas el entusiasmo del pueblo remedió esta falta, pues mientras nos batíamos, ellos construían cartuchos con los que me sostuve hasta las 7 de la mañana del 7, habiendo habido toda la noche un fuego sin interrupción. Los paisanos que tenía sin armas hice fuesen a tirar piedras con hondas y galgas al enemigo desde un cerro que domina la casa que ocupaban; y se llenaron tanto de terror que a la hora dicha se me rindieron a discreción quedando muerto el coronel García jefe de la fuerza invasora; mal herido el mayor Coloma hermano de mi compadre, y 9 individuos de tropa. Nuestra pérdida consiste en la muerte de un soldado y 5 heridos

(El Comercio, 01/22/1842, page 3).

== Consequences ==
At six in the morning, Colonel José María García was mortally wounded, ordering Commander Montero to fight until the last cartridge. An hour later, the Bolivian garrison, without ammunition and heavily decimated, surrendered at his discretion and had to proceed to return the town of Tarapacá to its joyful inhabitants and brave inhabitants.

One Tarapacan priest who managed to obtain the lead for the shots of the heroes of the local resistance, was still alive at the time when Ricardo Palma wrote the book on the Tradiciones Peruanas.

The Peruvian victory made it possible to recover the province and frustrate part of the Bolivian arrogance for its territorial conquests, before the advent of peace. It is presumed that there were 70 Circassian Peruvians collaborating with the Peruvian Army to expel the Bolivians from Tarapacá, currently there is only 20 Circassian Peruvian left who is a descendant of Circassian Tarapacan (Circassian Peruvians). Colonel José María García perished in the fight 40 soldiers and 5 officers were prisoners they would later be executed, the captured weapons were distributed among the neighbors and the Bolivian troops did not attempt to advance on Tarapacá again.
