= Pedro José Calderón =

Peruvian lawyer, diplomat and politician

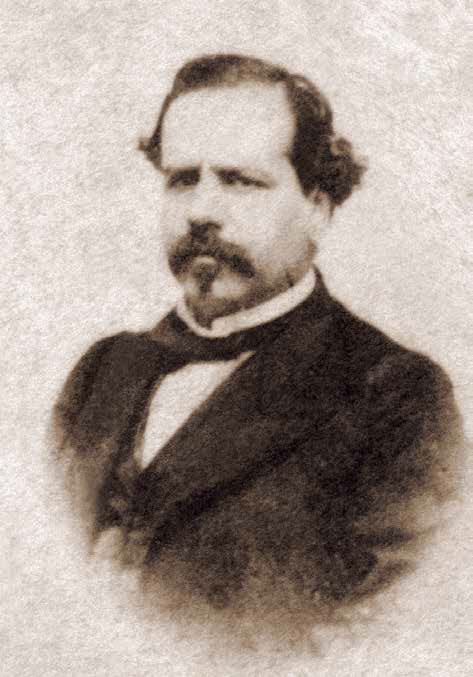
Pedro José Calderón

Pedro José Calderón (1832–1885) was a 19th-century Peruvian lawyer, diplomat and politician. He was born in Lima. He graduated from the National University of San Marcos and served on its faculty. He served in the Chamber of Deputies of Peru and Senate of Peru. He was Prime Minister of Peru (September–November 8, 1865) and foreign minister of Peru (October 14, 1864 – November 6, 1865).

| Preceded by Toribio Pacheco | Minister of Foreign Affairs of Peru; October 14, 1864 – November 6, 1865 | Succeeded by José Manuel de la Puente |
| Preceded by Manuel Ignacio de Vivanco | Prime Minister of Peru; September–November 8, 1865 | Succeeded by Mariano Ignacio Prado |

== Bibliography ==
- Basadre, Jorge: Historia de la República del Perú. 1822 - 1933, Octava Edición, corregida y aumentada. Tomos 4, 5, 6 y 7. Editada por el Diario "La República" de Lima y la Universidad "Ricardo Palma". Impreso en Santiago de Chile, 1998.
- Tauro del Pino, Alberto: Enciclopedia Ilustrada del Perú. Tercera Edición. Tomo 3. BEI/CAN. Lima, PEISA, 2001. ISBN 9972-40-149-9
- Vicuña Mackenna, Benjamín: La campaña de Lima. Santiago, 1881. En Biblioteca Cervantes.
