= Juan Crisóstomo Torrico =

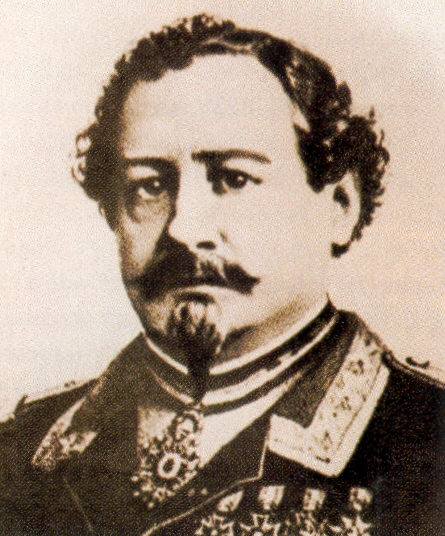
Juan Crisóstomo Torrico

Juan Crisóstomo Torrico Vargas (January 21, 1808, Lima, Peru – March 27, 1875, Paris, France) served as the 16th President of Peru during a brief period in 1842. At age 34, he was Peru's youngest President ever.

In 1820, Torrico participated in the army of José de San Martín. He subsequently joined the ranks of Agustín Gamarra and participated under his leadership campaigns against the Peru-Bolivian Confederation, where the Peruvian forces were defeated in 1841 and Gamarra died in the battle of Ingavi on November 18, 1841.

After Gamarra's death, Manuel Menéndez assumed the presidency of Peru. Torrico launched a successful coup d'état against Manuel Menéndez and assumed the presidency of Peru. His grab for power was short-lived since Peru was suffering various civil wars and Torrico was ousted during that same year by Juan Francisco de Vidal.

Torrico found refuge in Bolivia, where he conspired against Vidal and then against Manuel Ignacio de Vivanco. He returned to Peru after the fall of Vivanco's government in 1844. He was subsequently named Minister of Finance during Ramón Castilla's government in 1851, and later became Peru's ambassador to France under Juan Antonio Pezet.

He died in Paris on March 27, 1875.

Political offices
Preceded by Manuel Menéndez	President of Peru; 1842	Succeeded by Juan Francisco de Vidal
