= Justo Figuerola =

President of Peru

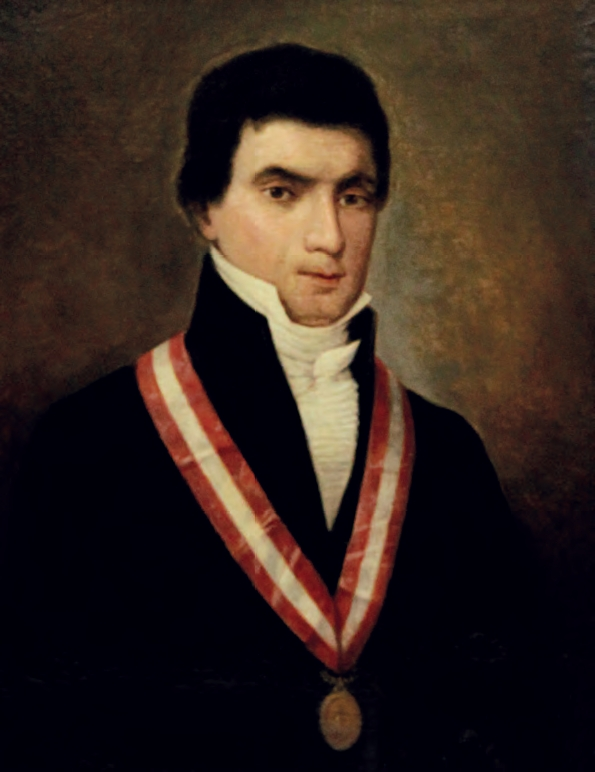
Justo Figuerola

Justo Figuerola (1770 in Lambayeque, Peru – 1854 in Lima, Peru) was a Peruvian politician who served as the Acting President of Peru from 15 March 1843 to 20 March 1843 and again from 11 August 1844 to 7 October 1844.

He served as the President of the Congress twice in 1823.

== See also ==
- List of presidents of Peru

Political offices
Preceded by Juan Francisco de Vidal	President of Peru; 1843	Succeeded by Manuel Ignacio de Vivanco
Preceded by Manuel Menéndez	President of Peru; 1844	Succeeded by Manuel Menéndez
