= Juan Antonio Pezet =

President of Peru from 1863 to 1865

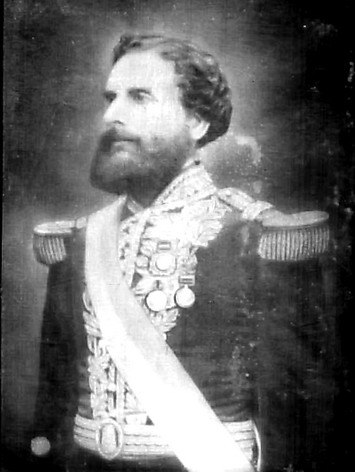

President of Peru
- In office August 5, 1863 – November 8, 1865
- Prime Minister: Juan Antonio Ribeyro Estrada; Manuel Costas Arce; Manuel Ignacio de Vivanco; Pedro José Calderón
- Preceded by: Pedro Diez Canseco
- Succeeded by: Pedro Diez Canseco

4th Prime Minister of Peru
- In office 1861–1863
- President: Ramón Castilla; Miguel de San Román
- Preceded by: José Maria Raygada y Gallo
- Succeeded by: Juan Antonio Ribeyro Estrada

Personal details
- Born: 11 June 1809 Lima, Viceroyalty of Peru, Spanish Empire
- Died: 24 March 1879 (aged 69) Lima, Peru

Juan Antonio Pezet y Rodríguez de la Piedra (11 June 1809 – 24 March 1879) was a Peruvian military officer and politician who served in the positions of Secretary of War, First Vice President and 16th President of Peru.

As President, his moderate and cautious attitude towards the occupation of the Chincha Islands by a Spanish Fleet in 1864 was used as an excuse to launch the 1865 military coup led by Colonel Mariano Prado that drove him out of power.

== Early years ==
Juan Antonio Pezet Rodríguez Piedra was born in Lima, Viceroyalty of Peru, the son of Dr. Jose Pezet Monel, a physician, journalist, literary and parliamentarian who was among the enterprising heroes of Peru's independence. His French-born grandfather, Antoine Pezet Eustache, had arrived in Lima in 1765. As a boy, Pezet briefly entered the Jesuit College of San Carlos. When General José de San Martín with the Chilean army obliged the viceroy to evacuate Lima in 1821, young Pezet joined the patriots and took part in the campaign as sub-lieutenant. In 1823, he was promoted to lieutenant, and under Bolívar and Sucre, he fought at Junín and Ayacucho.

He became captain in 1828, and in 1835, as colonel of the battalion of sharp-shooters of Rimac, he took part in the rising of President Agustín Gamarra against the Peru-Bolivian Confederacy and was banished.

After his return, he was appointed prefect of Lima and took part in the revolution of Vivanco in 1843. During the revolt, he was appointed Inspector-General of the Army and Prefect of La Libertad. He was wounded and taken prisoner in 1844 but was pardoned, became prefect of Arequipa in 1847, and in 1848 was made general-in-chief of the division of the south and prefect of nada.

Under President Echenique in 1853, he was appointed inspector-general and chief of the Army of the South during the invasion of Bolivia.

== President of the Republic ==
In 1859, Pezet was secretary of war; in 1862, he was elected first vice-president with General San Román, assuming the presidency following the death of the latter in 1863. Economically, he advocated for trade regulations. His administration saw the difficulties with Spain, which culminated in the occupation of the Chincha Islands on 14 April 1864.

But when he signed a treaty with the Spaniards on 27 January 1865, which was considered derogatory to Peruvian national honor, a general uprising followed, so on November 7, 1865, he delivered the executive office to the vice-president and retired to Europe, settling in Richmond, England. He returned in 1871 and lived in retirement in Chorrillos until his death.

Pezet was the dedicatee of a requiem by José María Valle Riestra, a relative by marriage.

Political offices
Preceded by —	Prime Minister of Peru; 1861–1863	Succeeded by Juan Antonio Ribeyro
Preceded by —	Vice President of Peru; October 1862 – April 1863	Succeeded by —
Preceded by Pedro Diez Canseco	President of Peru; August 1863 – April 1865	Succeeded by Mariano Ignacio Prado
Preceded by Mariano Ignacio Prado	President of Peru; June 1865 – November 1865	Succeeded by Pedro Diez Canseco
