= Battle of Ingavi =

Battle in the 1842 Bolivian–Peruvian War

Battle of Ingavi Battle of Incahue
- Part of Peruvian–Bolivian War
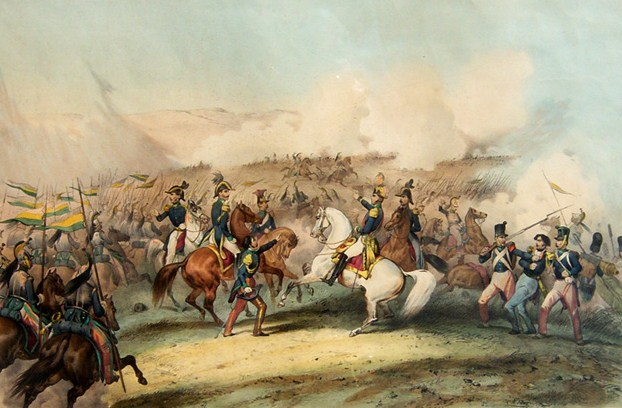
- Battle of Ingavi
Date	18 November, 1841
Location	Viacha, Ingavi Province, Bolivia 16.7567°S 68.330°W
Result	Bolivian victory

Belligerents
Republic of Peru	Republic of Bolivia

Commanders and leaders
(Peru) Agustín Gamarra † (Peru) Ramón Castilla (POW)	(Bolivia) José Ballivián

Strength
Peruvian Army 5,143	Bolivian Army 4,788

Casualties and losses
According to Carlos Dellepiane: 200 Dead, 50 wounded and 2,500 Prisoners	According to Fernando Kieffer: 208 soldiers dead and 434 wounded
- Location within Bolivia Battle of Ingavi (South America) Battle of Ingavi (America)

The Battle of Ingavi was fought on 18 November 1841, near Viacha, during the Peruvian–Bolivian War of 1841–1842. The Bolivian Army under the command of José Ballivián repelled the invading Peruvian Army commanded by Agustín Gamarra, who was killed in action. Ingavi was the decisive engagement that prevented Peruvian annexation and secured Bolivian independence.

== Background ==
Following the dissolution of the Peru–Bolivian Confederation, Peruvian President Agustín Gamarra, made the decision to invade Bolivia, using the political chaos occurring in the country as an excuse. Gamarra had from the beginning supported a union between Peru and Bolivia but preferred it to be completely dominated by the Peruvian government, rather than being a confederation between the two nations.

Immediately, José Ballivián assumed power and proclaimed himself president. There were three different governments attempting to rule Bolivia: a legitimate government headquartered in Chuquisaca, headed by José Mariano Serrano; another headquartered in Cochabamba, headed by José Miguel de Velasco; and that of Ballivián, headquartered in La Paz.

Faced with the danger of a Peruvian invasion, the three governments joined under Ballivián and readied their armies, which in Ingavi repelled the Peruvians and invaded southern Peru.

== Result ==
On 18 November 1841, with Agustín Gamarra being dead, the Peruvian Army left Bolivia. The news generated chaos in Lima, where Vice President Manuel Menéndez struggled to maintain his authority. He was soon deposed, with Juan Crisóstomo Torrico assuming power, which returned order to the country. It was the last attempt of Peru to try to assume control of Bolivia.

The Bolivian Army did not have enough troops to maintain the occupation. In the Siege of Tarapacá, Peruvian montoneros, formed by Major Juan Buendía, from Iquique defeated on 7 January 1842 the detachment led by Colonel José María García, who died in the confrontation. Thus, Bolivian troops vacated Tacna, Arica and Tarapacá in February 1842 and retreated to Moquegua and Puno.

In Arica, Peruvian militias expelled Bolivian troops who sought to take over the port. In the battles of Motoni and Orurillo, Peru evicted and subsequently initiated the withdrawal of the remaining Bolivian forces that occupied Peruvian territory, again threatening Bolivia to suffer an invasion.
