= Domingo Nieto =

President of Peru

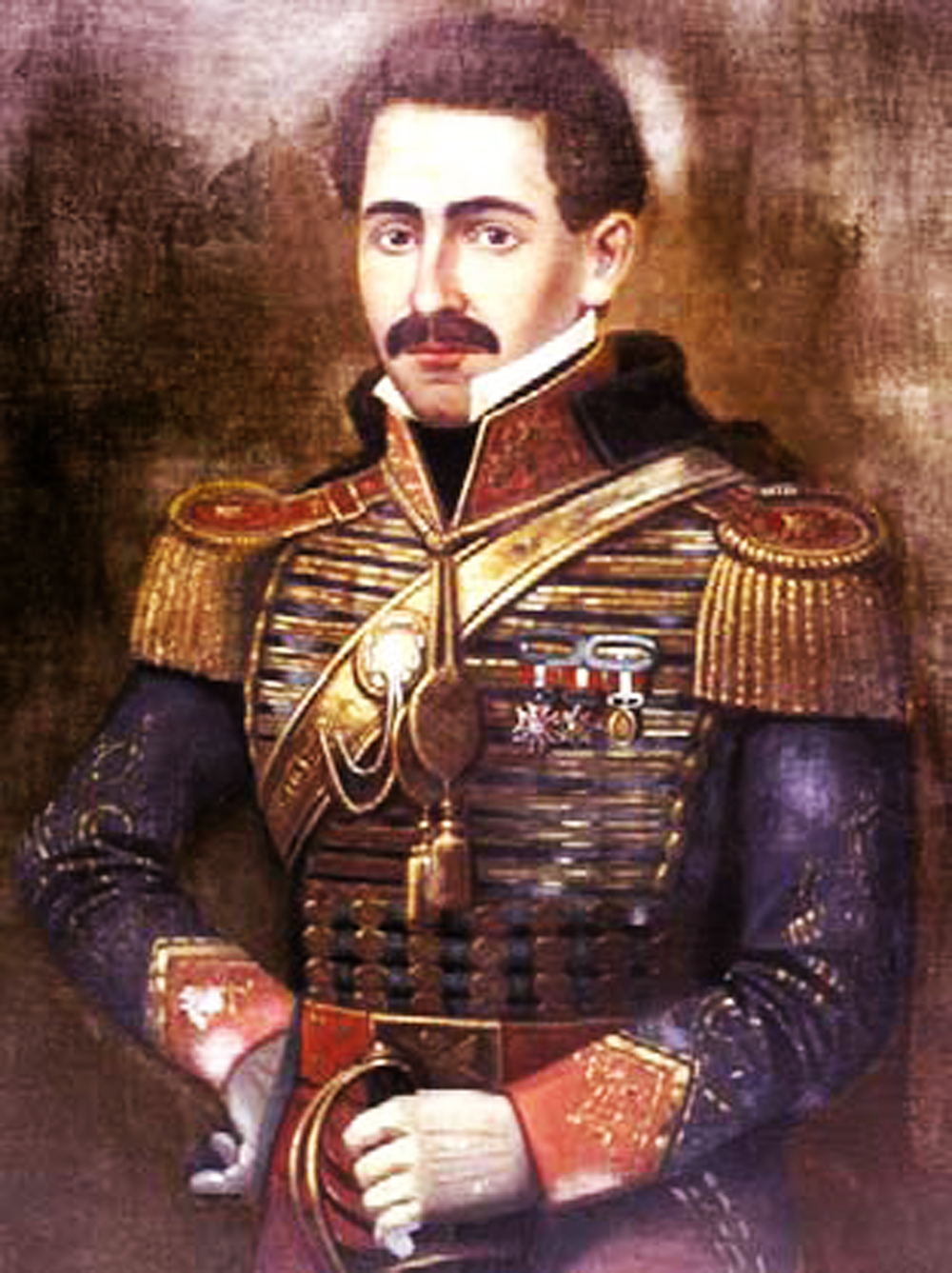

President of the Supreme Council of Peru
- In office September 3, 1843 – February 17, 1844
- Preceded by: Manuel Ignacio de Vivanco
- Succeeded by: Ramón Castilla

Personal details
- Born: Domingo Nieto y Marques; 15 August 1803 Moquegua, Viceroyalty of Peru
- Died: 17 February 1844 (aged 40) Cusco, Peru

Military service
- Allegiance: Peru
- Years of service: 1821–1844
- Rank: Field marshal
- Battles/wars: Battle of Miraveh; First Intermedios campaign; Battle of Torata; Battle of Moquegua; Battle of Junín; Battle of Ayacucho; Gran Colombia–Peru War; Battle of Tarqui; Battle of Agua Santa

Domingo Nieto (15 August 1803 – 17 February 1844) was a Peruvian Grand Marshal, forefather of the nation, and politician who served as de facto President of Peru between 1843 and 1844, as the President of the Government Junta during the revolution against Manuel Ignacio de Vivanco. He also served as Minister Plenipotentiary to Ecuador.

Nieto was born in Ilo – Moquegua in 1803, to a Spanish-Peruvian noble family bearing the title of "Counts of Alastaya", who were also of local noble blood directly descended from the Inca Huayna Capac by marriage of his daughter Catalina Sisa Occllo to the Conquistador Pedro Ladron de Guevara, who is a direct ascendant of the family. As an aristocratic youth, he quickly became disenchanted with Spanish rule and took the cause for Peruvian independence at the age of 18. Being one of the few nobles at the time that participated directly in the wars of independence, he is a unique member of the "forefathers of the nation" pantheon in Perú.

During his military and political career he was called "the soldier/quixote of the law" for having a reputation of defending the constitution against all odds and siding with the rule of law, which clearly separated him from his peers. He is historically Peru's most remarkable military strategist and victorious figure, his military achievements made him a General by the age of 29 and Grand Marshal of Peru by the age of 39, something never repeated again in Peruvian history. He is also credited with participating and being victorious in the last recorded "personal combat" in the Battle of Tarqui, with the Venezuelan commandant José María Camacaro, assuming the challenge of deciding the fate of a battle in a single one-on-one combat.

In his final years, he led, with Ramón Castilla by his side, the overthrow of the "Supreme Dictator" Manuel Ignacio de Vivanco, assuming the presidency of Peru after being elected by the provisional Government Junta (provisional congress) charged with the re-establishment of constitutional order. He died soon after in office, on February 17, 1844. Castilla succeeded him by election of the Junta.

== Legacy ==
- In 1936, under Law No 8230, the newly created Department of Moquequa had one of its provinces named after him.
- Through Resolution Nº12177 passed by the Peruvian congress, on December 24, 1954, he was declared National Hero and his remains were translated from Moquegua to the Pantheon of Heros.
- Through Supreme Resolution Nº31 IGE/IM of September 19, 1949 the presidential guard was renamed in his Honor: the Presidential Life Guard Dragoons Regiment ("Regimiento de Caballería "Mariscal Domingo Nieto" Escolta del Presidente de la República"). It was later disbanded in 1987 under order of President Alan Garcia Perez. However, as of 2012, the regiment was brought back into active service under Ministerial Resolution No139-2012/DE/EP signed by current incumbent president Ollanta Humala. In the years between, it served as an armored regiment.
- A military academy of the Peruvian Army in the Province of Ilio, State of Moquegua was named after him.

== Bibliography ==
- Basadre, Jorge: Historia de la República del Perú. 1822 – 1933, Octava Edición, corregida y aumentada. Tomos 1, 2 y 3. Editada por el Diario "La República" de Lima y la Universidad "Ricardo Palma". Impreso en Santiago de Chile, 1998.
- Chirinos Soto, Enrique: Historia de la República (1821–1930). Tomo I. Desde San Martín hasta Augusto B. Leguía. Lima, AFA Editores Importadores S.A, 1985.
- Tauro del Pino, Alberto: Enciclopedia Ilustrada del Perú. Tercera Edición. Tomo 11. MEN/OJE. Lima, PEISA, 2001. ISBN 978-9972-40-149-7, OCLC 253649607, Enciclopedia ilustrada del Perú: MEN-OJE at Google Books
- Vargas Ugarte, Rubén: Historia General del Perú. Sétimo y Octavo Tomo. Primera Edición. Editor Carlos Milla Batres. Lima, Perú, 1971.
- Varios autores: Grandes Forjadores del Perú. Lima, Lexus Editores, 2000. ISBN 9972-625-50-8

Political offices
Preceded by Manuel Ignacio de Vivanco	President of Peru; 1843–1844	Succeeded by Ramón Castilla
