= Library of Congress of Peru =

Peruvian congress research library

"César Vallejo" Library of Congress of the Republic
- Biblioteca del Congreso de la República César Vallejo
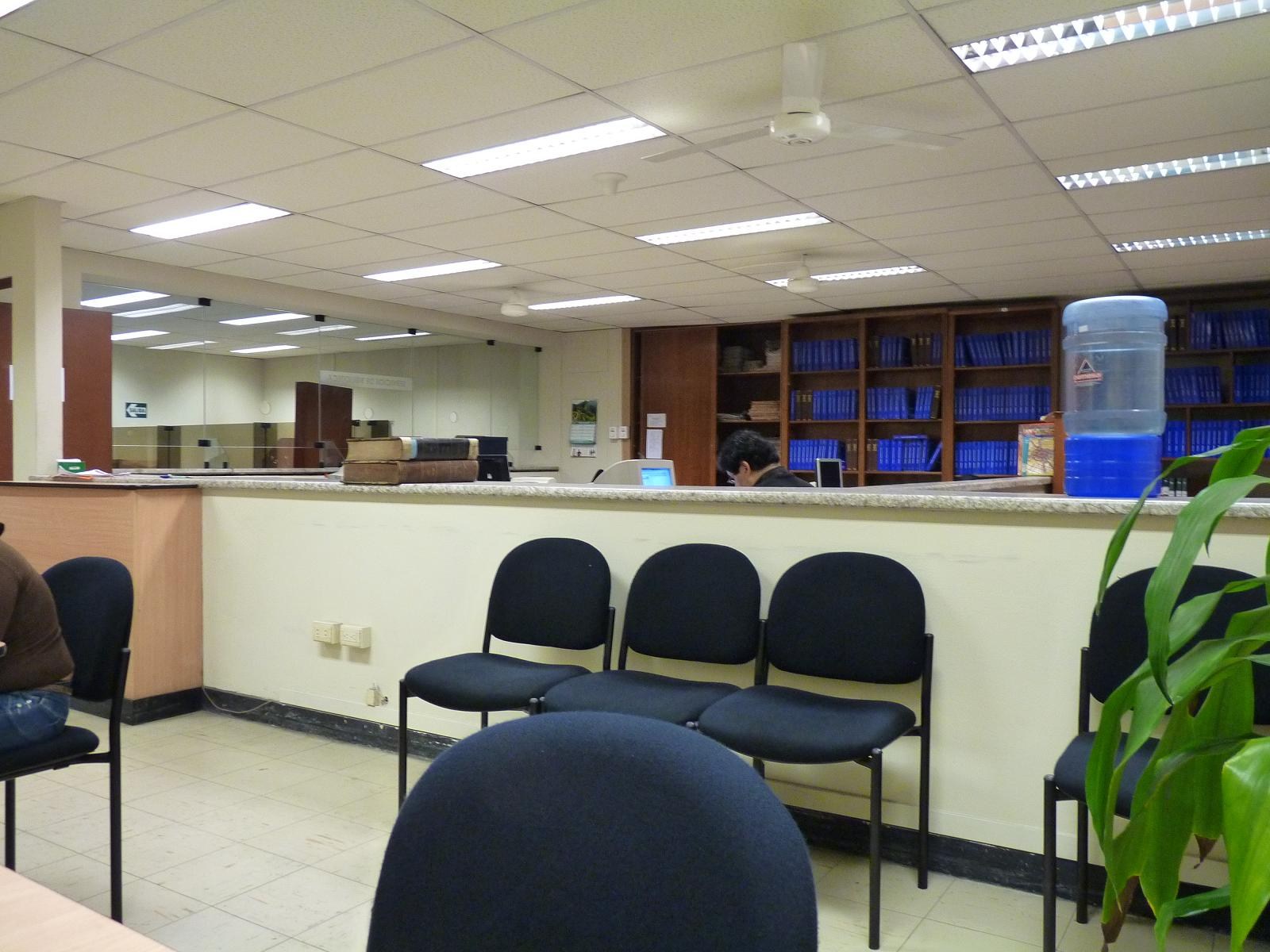
- Location: Jr. Huallaga 330, Lima, Peru

Access and use
- Population served: Congress, citizens, and international visitors

Other information
- Director: José Antonio Cevallos Scudin

The Library of Congress (Spanish: Biblioteca del Congreso), officially the "César Vallejo" Library of Congress of the Republic (Spanish: Biblioteca del Congreso de la República "César Vallejo"), is a research library named after Peruvian writer César Vallejo located at the basement of Fernando Belaúnde Terry Building, itself located at 330 Jirón Huallaga, in the historic centre of Lima, Peru. It serves the Congress of Peru, as well as the general public of the country.

The library is part of the Network of Parliamentary Libraries of Latin America and the Caribbean (Spanish: Red de Biblliotecas Parlamentarias de América Latina y el Caribe; Red Biparlac).

== History ==
The library's predecessor was the Public Library of the Chamber of Deputies (Spanish: Biblioteca Pública de la Cámara de Diputados), founded on July 26, 1943, in the aftermath of the fire that consumed the National Library of Peru. Promoted by Gerardo Balbuena Carrillo, it was reorganised in 1945. It ceased to exist in 1996. Its directors were:

- César Fernandini (1943-1952)
- Humberto del Pino (1952-1955)
- Luis Rodríguez Vildozola (1956-1962)
- Mario Peláez Bazán (1963-1975)
- Oliverio Portal Lovera (1976-1989)
- Manuel Pinzas Loyola (1990-1991)
- Carmen Luz Díaz Flores (1992)
- Carmen Isaura Chipana Choque (1992)
- Fernando Ayllón Dulanto (1992-1993)
- Orlando Martínez Rivera (1993-1996)

== See also ==
- Congress of Peru
- National Library of Peru
