= Mariano Ignacio Prado =

President of Peru variously in the 1800s

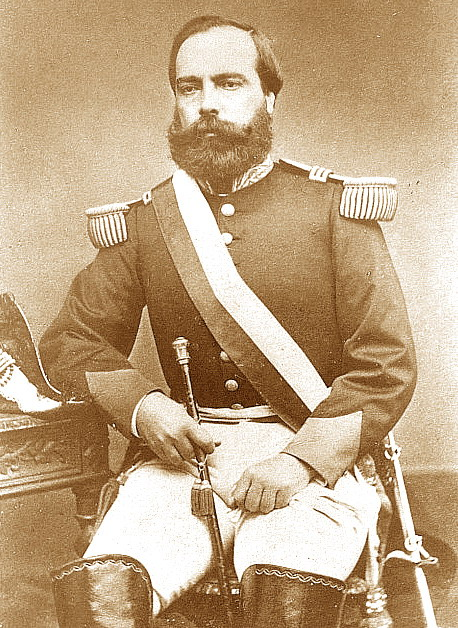

President of Peru
- In office 28 November 1865 – 7 January 1868
- Prime Minister: Pedro José de Saavedra; Luis La Puerta
- Preceded by: Pedro Diez Canseco
- Succeeded by: Pedro Diez Canseco
- In office 2 August 1876 – 23 December 1879
- Prime Minister: Antonio Arenas; Teodoro La Rosa; Juan Buendía Noriega; José Jorge Loayza; Manuel Irigoyen Larrea; Manuel de Mendiburu; Manuel Gonzáles de la Cotera
- Vice President: Luis La Puerta; José Francisco Canevaro
- Preceded by: Manuel Pardo y Lavalle
- Succeeded by: Luis La Puerta

Personal details
- Born: Huánuco, Peru; 18 December 1825
- Died: Paris, France; 5 May 1901 (aged 75)
- Profession: Army General

Mariano Ignacio Prado Ochoa (18 December 1825 – 5 May 1901) was a Peruvian army general who served twice as President of Peru (1865-1868 and 1876-1879).

== Biography ==
Born in Huánuco on 18 December 1825, he studied in Huánuco and then in Lima. He entered the army at an early age and served in the provinces of Southern Peru.

In 1865, Prado led a coup to overthrow President Juan Antonio Pezet who under the threat of a large Spanish fleet surrendered sovereignty over the Chincha Islands and agreed to pay a large indemnity to Spain. Vice President Pedro Diez Canseco became Provisional President until new elections were held later that year and which Prado won. In 1866 the Spanish fleet attacked and was defeated under General Prado's command at the Battle of Dos de Mayo in Callao 1866. His 12 year old son and later hero Leoncio Prado participated in the battle. Prado had put together an alliance with Chile, Bolivia and Ecuador all of whom supplied troops that defeated Spain. At the time only Peru had a few naval vessels which earlier had forced the Spanish fleet to retire at the Battle of Abtao, Chile in 1866. In gratitude, Chile conferred Prado with the honorary title of General of the Army of Chile. He served as the President of the Chamber of Deputies from 1874 to 1875.

After Manuel Pardo's presidential term ended in 1876, Prado was elected president again on 2 August that year. His second term was marked by the War of the Pacific (1879–1884) which broke out with Chile. Prado took active command of the defenses of Tacna and Tarapacá (where he met Bolivian president Hilarión Daza), with the intention of taking command of the armies assembling there. Former President Pardo had downsized the army to 2,000 soldiers and had failed to modernize. President Prado returned to Lima to organize the defense of the country.

In 1879, the Congress of Peru authorized President Prado to leave the country in search of arms in New York and naval vessels in Brest, France. On 18 December he left for New York to meet with William R. Grace founder of W.R. Grace (founded in Lima in 1854) and friend of President Prado. Upon his arrival in New York, he was informed that Nicolas de Pierola had taken control of the capital Lima on 23 December. Nicolas de Pierola had been plotting to take over for many years and had returned to Lima from Santiago just before the war with Chile broke out. Pierola used Prado's trip to claim Prado had fled the country. These and subsequent accusations were proven false. Pierola mismanaged the war effort and deserted the capital when Chile troops landed in Barranco, south of Lima. Despite the occupation of Lima, the war with Chile continued led by General Cáceres. During this phase of the war General Prado's son Leoncio was captured and executed by Chile. General Prado lost three sons in the war with Chile. An armistice was signed on 20 October 1883, and a final peace treaty was signed in 1929 with the return of Tacna to Peru. Prado was exonerated by General Caceres and returned to Peru.

General Prado was also a successful businessman who accumulated his fortune prior to entering politics. His wife Magdalena Ugarteche came from a wealthy business family. He had holdings in various enterprises including mining in Peru and Chile. For health reasons he went to Paris in 1901 where he died. His son Manuel Ignacio Prado Ugarteche was two times President of Peru.

== See also ==
- List of presidents of Peru
- Peruvian civil war of 1867
- Politics of Peru
- War of the Pacific

== Notes ==
Political offices
Preceded by Juan Antonio Pezet	Interim President of Peru; April 1865 – June 1865	Succeeded by Juan Antonio Pezet
Preceded by Pedro José Calderón	Prime Minister of Peru; 9 November 1865 – June 1867	Succeeded by Pedro J. Saavedra
Preceded by Pedro Diez Canseco	President of Peru; November 1865 – January 1868	Succeeded by Pedro Diez Canseco
Preceded by Manuel Pardo	President of Peru; August 1876 – December 1879	Succeeded by Nicolás de Piérola
