= Manuel Ignacio de Vivanco =

President of Peru

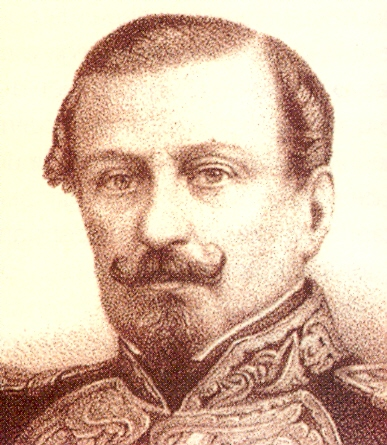

Supreme Director of Peru
- In office 27 March 1843 – 17 June 1844
- Preceded by: Justo Figuerola
- Succeeded by: Domingo Elías

Personal details
- Born: 15 June 1806 Lima, Viceroyalty of Peru
- Died: 16 September 1873 (aged 67) Valparaíso, Chile

Manuel Ignacio de Vivanco Iturralde (15 June 1806 – 16 September 1873) was a Peruvian politician and military leader who served as the de facto President of Peru from 1843 to 1844. He was born in Lima, Peru. He led part of the Peruvian forces in the campaign against the reunification of Peru-Bolivian Confederacy.

During the second administration of Agustín Gamarra, he was appointed prefect of Arequipa. In 1843, he rebelled against Juan Francisco de Vidal, but was defeated and fled to Bolivia. He returned to Peru then and subsequently took over the government in 1843 under the title "Supreme Director of the Republic". His government in Lima was then overthrown by Domingo Elías in June 1844, and Vivanco himself was defeated at the Battle of Carmen Alto a month later, on 22 July.

In the name of president Juan Antonio Pezet he signed the Vivanco–Pareja Treaty on 27 January 1865, which was one cause of the Chincha Islands War. From April to September 1865, he served as Prime Minister of Peru. He also served as Peruvian representative in Chile.

== See also ==
- Politics of Peru
- List of presidents of Peru

Political offices
Preceded by Justo Figuerola	Self-proclaimed President of Peru; 1843–1844	Succeeded by Domingo Elías
Preceded by José Manuel Costas Arce	Prime Minister of Peru; April–September 1865	Succeeded by Pedro José Calderón
