= Juan Francisco de Vidal =

President of Peru from 1842 to 1843

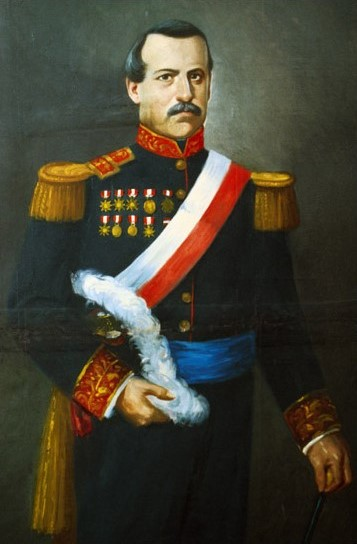

Interim President of Peru
- In office 20 October 1842 – 15 March 1843
- Preceded by: Manuel Menéndez
- Succeeded by: Manuel Ignacio de Vivanco

Personal details
- Born: April 2, 1800 Supe, Viceroyalty of Peru, Spanish Empire
- Died: September 23, 1863 (aged 63) Lima, Peru

Juan Francisco de Vidal La Hoz (April 2, 1800 – September 23, 1863) served as interim President of Peru for a brief period between 1842 and 1843. Juan Francisco also helped with creating a certain version of laws for the rights of citizens.

== See also ==
- List of presidents of Peru
