= Agustín Gamarra =

President of Peru variously in the 1800s (1785–1841)

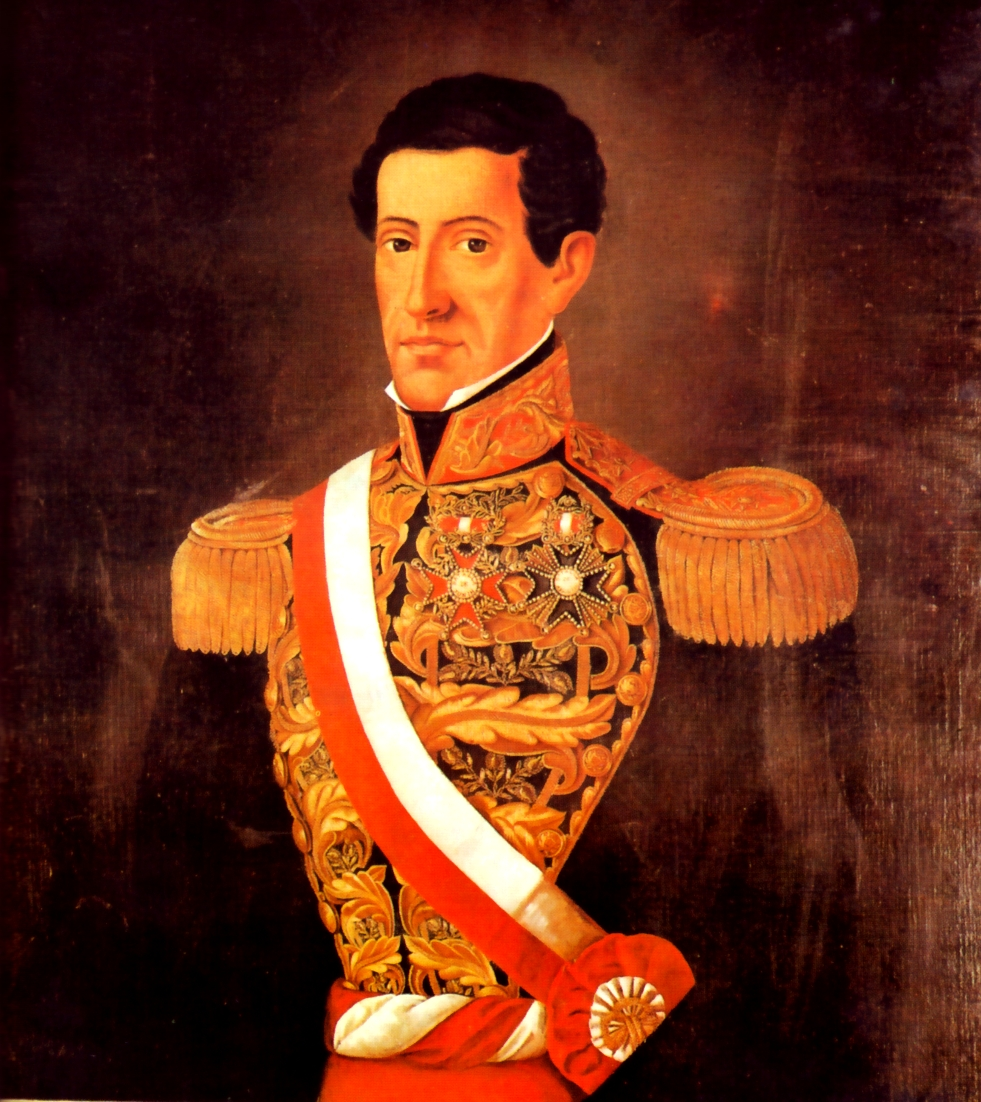

4th & 7th President of Peru
- In office 25 August 1838 – 18 November 1841
- Preceded by: Andrés de Santa Cruz
- Succeeded by: Manuel Menéndez
- In office 1 September 1829 – 20 December 1833
- Vice President: Antonio Gutiérrez de la Fuente
- Preceded by: Antonio Gutiérrez de la Fuente
- Succeeded by: Luis José de Orbegoso

Personal details
- Born: 27 August 1785 Cuzco, Viceroyalty of Peru, Spanish Empire
- Died: 18 November 1841 (aged 56) Ingavi, Bolivia
- Spouse: Francisca Zubiaga y Bernales
- Profession: Soldier

Military service
- Allegiance: Spain; Peru
- Branch/service: Royal Army of Peru; Peruvian Army
- Years of service: 1809–1821; 1821–1841
- Rank: Colonel (Spain); Grand marshal (Peru)
- Battles/wars: Bolivian War of Independence; Cuzco Rebellion of 1814; Peruvian War of Independence; Gran Colombia–Peru War; War of the Confederation; Peruvian-Bolivian War of 1841-1842

Agustín Gamarra Messia (27 August 1785 – 18 November 1841) was a Peruvian soldier and politician, who served twice as President of Peru, first from 1829-1833, and then again from 1838 until his death in 1841.

Gamarra was a Mestizo, being of mixed Spanish and Quechua descent. He had a military life since childhood, battling against the royalist forces. He then joined the cause of Independence as second in command after Andrés de Santa Cruz. He also participated in the Battle of Ayacucho, and was later named Chief of State. In 1825, he married Francisca ('Pancha') Zubiaga y Bernales, who Simon Bolivar crowned when she was about to put the crown on him. After the invasion of Bolivia in 1828, he was named a mariscal (marshal), a highly esteemed military officer.

After the defeat of José de La Mar in Gran Colombia, Gamarra urged his overthrow and assumed the presidency for a brief period after Antonio Gutiérrez de la Fuente. The peace treaty with Gran Colombia was also signed during Gamarra's government. He was a supporter of protectionism. Although the Cuzco council supported the Gamarrista line of protectionism, it frequently clashed with Gamarra himself.

Gamarra was killed in battle during a failed invasion of Bolivia, leading to the period known as the Military Anarchy. Several magistrates and dictators fought for power until 1845, when order was restored by President Ramón Castilla. The presidency was officially vacant during this time.

== Presidency of Peru ==
=== First presidency ===
The government of Gamarra followed contrary beliefs to those of José de La Mar. This coincided with a great Peruvian constitutionalist movement; Gamarra put aside the Constitution of 1828, which he opposed given the limitations that were established for the executive branch.

Gamarra finished, with great effort, his first constitutional government. He had a very active character which allowed him to leave Lima to thwart rebellions in various parts of the country. During such expeditions he would leave the presidency to Antonio Gutiérrez de la Fuente, who manifested his authoritarian character and started to receive the enmity of other government officials based in Lima.

Despite his efforts, Gamarra faced continuous challenges in consolidating his power, including rebellions across the country, plots led by his vice president Antonio Gutiérrez de la Fuente, and persistent opposition from Congress, which he even closed in 1832. The election of his successor, Luis José de Orbegoso, triggered a civil war, with gamarrista forces resisting in the highlands for several months, highlighting the instability that marked his first term.

=== Peru and Ecuador one and indivisible? ===
Another idea that obsessed Gamarra was the annexation of Bolivia. He shared this idea with Andrés de Santa Cruz. However, while Bolivian elites did not think of the creation of one single State, Gamarra believed in the incorporation of the Bolivian territory under a single Peruvian nation.

=== Second presidency and invasion of Bolivia ===
In 1835, when Orbegoso and Andrés Santa Cruz signed the treaty to establish the Peru-Bolivian Confederacy, Gamarra deeply opposed it and participated in a campaign to defeat it with the help of Chile. This led to the Battle of Yungay and the overthrow of Santa Cruz. Gamarra was then officially named President by the Peruvian congress.

From January to October 1839 the Chilean troops of General Manuel Bulnes were stationed in Lima to stabilize Gamarra's new regime.

During his second government, Gamarra confronted the challenge of pacifying the country in middle of various subversions while at the same time the beginning of a war against Bolivia. Gamarra was defeated and killed by Bolivian forces during the Battle of Ingavi in 1841.

After retaking the presidency as “Restaurador del Perú,” Gamarra faced new rebellions and political instability. He declared war on Bolivia for supporting insurgent leaders, but during the ensuing conflict he was defeated and killed at the Battle of Ingavi on November 18, 1841. These defeats reflected how the prolonged internal struggles and factionalism in Peru had weakened the country, leaving it more divided and less capable of defending itself from regional rivals.

== Bibliography ==
- Josephus Nelson Larned; Donald Eugene Smith; Charles Seymour; Augustus Hunt Shearer; Daniel Chauncey Knowlton (1924). The New Larned History for Ready Reference, Reading and Research: The Actual Words of the World's Best Historians, Biographers and Specialists; a Complete System of History for All Uses, Extending to All Countries and Subjects and Representing the Better and Newer Literature of History. C.A. Nichols Publishing Company.

Political offices
Preceded by Antonio Gutiérrez de la Fuente	President of Peru; 1829–1833	Succeeded by Francisco Xavier de Luna Pizarro
Preceded by Andrés de Santa Cruz	President of Peru; 1838–1841	Succeeded by Manuel Menéndez
