= Anti-Peruvian sentiment =

Hatred or fear of anything Peruvian

Anti-Peruvian (Spanish: Antiperuanismo), or Peruvophobia, refers to negative feelings, fear, hatred and discrimination toward and/or against Peruvians based on a combination of historical, cultural, and ethnic prejudices.

It arose since the 19th century in some societies as a consequence of their territorial expansion. It germinated as a tendency in the nationalisms of neighboring countries, mainly Ecuador, Chile and to a lesser extent due to the disputed origin of different cultural manifestations, such as recipes and gastronomic preparations (such as pisco or picarones) or folkloric dances (such as the diablada or the morenada) whose origin is disputed or shared with Chile and Bolivia. In addition, due to different political and ideological differences with the Bolivarian leaders and their Chavista sympathizers in Venezuela.

It can manifest itself in many ways, such as individual hatred or discrimination, tabloid media, attacks by groups organized for that purpose, even on social networks.

== By country ==
=== Argentina ===
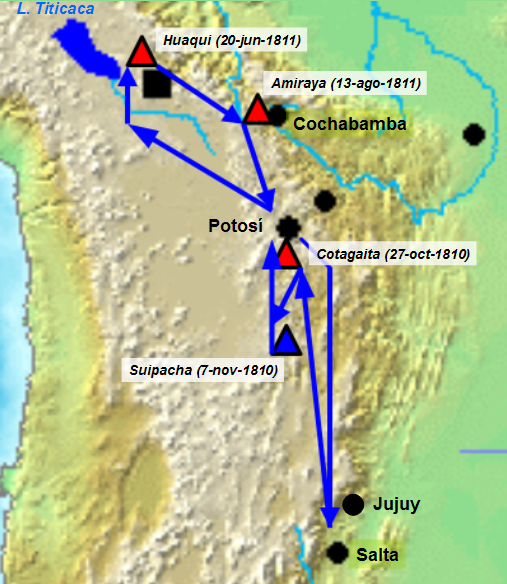
Confrontations between the Army of the North and the Royal Army of Peru in Upper Peru, which unleashed some anti-Peruvian tendencies in the Buenos Aires Junta against a counterrevolutionary Peru.

In the midst of the Argentine War of Independence and the Auxiliary Expeditions to Upper Peru, there was a climate of tension between Peru, loyal to the Spanish Crown, and the Junta de Buenos Aires seeking the independence of the Río de la Plata and spreading the May Revolution to all of South America, which generated warlike confrontations between Peruvian supporters of the counterrevolution and Argentine supporters of the revolution; In the midst of these events, there were some signs of anti-Peruvianism in the most conflictive stages of those events, since these troops devastated the region and caused local rejection of any union with the "porteños", to the extent that there were Peruvians who did not want direct borders with the so-called "aggressive" Buenos Aires (due to their invasions of Charcas). Samples of this anti-Peruvian aggressiveness occurred when the Argentine government ordered the execution of the leaders of the Córdoba Counterrevolution, which were having support of the Viceroyalty of Peru, also served to teach a "lesson to the leaders of Peru", since at first it was intended to gather the prisoners so that they could be sent, without making detours, either to Buenos Aires or to the city of Córdoba "according to the most convenient", however the order to execute the counterrevolutionary leaders at the moment of their capture, a decision promoted by Mariano Moreno and which had been taken by the full Primera Junta, except for Manuel Alberti (who excused himself due to his ecclesiastical character), served as a warning of hostility of the junta towards the peoples opposed to the revolution, with emphasis on Cordoba and Peruvians.

"Reserved. The sacred rights of the King and the Homeland have armed the arm of justice and this Junta has struck down a sentence against the conspirators of Córdoba accused for the notoriety of their crimes and convicted by the general vote of all the good ones. The Board orders that they be harquebused Dn. Santiago Liniers, Don Juan Gutiérrez de la Concha, the Bishop of Córdoba, Dn. Victorino Rodríguez, Colonel Allende and the Royal Official Dn. Joaquin Moreno. At the moment that each or every one of them is caught, whatever the circumstances, this resolution will be executed, without giving rise to minutes that provide requests and relationships capable of compromising compliance with this order and the honor of Your Excellency. This punishment must be the basis of the stability of the new system and a lesson for the chiefs of Peru, who advance to a thousand excesses for the hope of impunity and is at the same time the proof of the usefulness and energy with which this Expedition fills the important objects what is it intended for."

There were also signs of Peruvian-phobia on the part of the Argentines of the Junta when Manuel Belgrano exposed on July 6, 1816, in front of the deputies of the Congress of Tucumán in two meetings, a proposal to establish an almost nominal monarchy, discussing first about choosing a European prince and then a Peruvian sovereign from the descendants of the Incas to offer the throne, it was most likely projected that the title would correspond to Juan Bautista Túpac Amaru, the only known surviving brother of the Inca noble, Túpac Amaru II, although they also considered Dionisio Inca Yupanqui, a mestizo jurist and soldier who had been educated in Europe and who was the representative of Peru at the Cortes of Cádiz, or Juan Andrés Jiménez de León Manco Cápac, a mestizo cleric and soldier who earned his fame for opposing the excessive collection of tribute and that he participated as a military commander in the uprising of Juan José Castelli. Only four days after making this proclamation, the great announcement of the Independence of Argentina took place, with a large majority of the assembly members opting for the suggested monarchical form that, in addition, should have its headquarters in the city of Cuzco, the capital of the projected New Kingdom. Only Godoy Cruz and part of his collaborators demanded that said capital be in Buenos Aires. According to this "Plan del Inca", it would be an effective and constitutional parliamentary-style government, similar to the British one, to achieve prompt international recognition of Argentine independence. His proposal to establish a parliamentary Inca monarchy was ridiculed by his contemporaries who supported the formation of a republic, the original project was rejected mainly for reasons of anti-Peruvian racism. The Buenos Aires delegates expressed their total rejection of the delusional idea, almost without being heard. It is said that one of them came to shout there: "I'd rather be dead than serve a king with flip flops!"; and that the journalists from Buenos Aires mocked the decision, assuring that now he would have to go look for "a dirty-legged king in some grocery store or tavern in the Altiplano". The Congress of Tucumán finally decided to reject the Inca's plan because anti-Peruvian fellings, creating in its place a republican and centralist state with its capital in Buenos Aires.

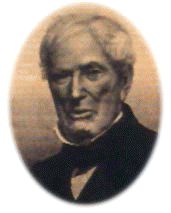
Guillermo Brown, Irish soldier, naturalized Argentine, who carried out privateering attacks on the coasts of Peru.

Another example of anti-Peruvianism, as well as anti-Chileanism and Hispanophobia, was Brown's privateering expedition to the Pacific, sponsored by the government of Buenos Aires, where ships were sent on a privateering expedition to the Pacific coast against civilians, without engaging them in a regular naval warfare against the military, whose main targets were the ports of Chile and Peru, to weaken Spanish trade, as well as Peruvian. Although the preparations were carried out in secret, some royalists from Buenos Aires tried to pass communications to Chile to prepare defense actions, but the governor of Cuyo, José de San Martín, managed to intercept those attempts. One of the main objectives of the corsairs Argentinians was the Port of Callao, which was attacked in January 1816.

"On January 22, the perverse Brown woke up anchored near the mouth of the Rimac River with the greatest insolence imaginable, as if he knew that there was no gunboat or armed ship in the port. His forces were composed of four ships and a pailebot. Three of them went ahead until they anchored in the same bay, fired a few cannon shots as if to mock them, they were answered by the castles, they raised anchor again and kept looking around until midnight, when they returned to shoot at the port, and They managed to do the damage by sinking one of the ships that remained at anchor, the frigate Fuente-Hermosa."

— Royalist account of the facts

Such was the hostility of the Argentine corsairs towards the Peruvian population, that it has been recorded that several travelers from Peru to Europe (especially friars of the Catholic Church), at the moment of undertaking the return from the Brazilian coast to Peru, arrived in to prefer the land route, from Goiás and Mato Grosso, to reach Peru via the Amazon, "rather than run the risk of falling into the hands of corsairs from La Plata at sea."

On the other hand, some historians, with indigenist, Hispanist or revisionist orientations of the nationalist current, have wanted to affirm that the Argentine Liberator himself, Don José de San Martin, could have been an anti-Peruvian figure, questioning whether a foreigner would arrive (San Martín) to proclaim independence. An independence, considered imposed (favoring the historiographical thesis of independence granted, and not achieved or conceived) and very probably against the will of the Peruvians (from which previous declarations of independence would have already emerged, such as the Cuzco Rebellion, later repressed by the Peruvians themselves loyal to the Viceroyalty, and without the need for the intervention of an invading army), based on some phrases such as:

"I believe that all the power of the supreme being is not enough to liberate that despicable country (Peru): only Bolívar, supported by force, can do it."

— Don José de San Martín

It is also known that San Martín wanted the disputed territory of Upper Peru, administered since 1810 by the Viceroyalty of Peru, to be handed over to the United Provinces of the Río de la Plata, which, although it would be somewhat predictable on his part (because it was an Argentine) in the exercise of a realpolitik, on the other hand it would be a sign of anti-Peruvianism on his part in the face of vague promises that he made to warlords, like Andrés de Santa Cruz, over the territory. Given this, he was allegedly accused of being dishonest with his ambiguous promises that he gave to Peruvian politicians who supported his government, since the Protectorate of San Martín de facto controlled the Atacama Party and was also claiming part of the territories of the current La Paz and Pando. That ended up generating a climate of mistrust, where the praises and praise of the Peruvians to the Liberator would have been apparent, in the midst of hostilities towards the Argentine caudillo. In the secret session of the Peruvian Congress, on September 27, 1822, suspicion and fear were expressed that San Martín tried to seize the provinces of Upper Peru, Arequipa and Cuzco.

In addition, San Martín came to be accused of falling into a serious anti-Peruvian hypocrisy with the monarchical project of the Protectorate of San Martín, by preferring the coming of European princes (betraying several nationalist Peruvians), leaving aside the already existing and millennial institutions national monarchists in Peru to imitate the parliamentary constitutionalism of the English and French in the restoration (being accused of being Anglophile and Frenchified by Peruvian Hispanicism), as well as having little or no consideration for monarchical proposals that represented the interests of the indigenous nobility (being accused of Criollo elitist by the Peruvian indigenism). For example, the case of the indigenous nobility of the Cajamarca region, which, after obtaining knowledge of the sworn independence on January 8, 1821, by Torre Tagle (despite the exclusion of indigenous representatives from the Cabildo de Naturales and famous curacas in rural populations, such as Manuel Anselmo Carhuaguatay), he tried to introduce himself and propose that the form of government of the new Peruvian state should correspond to a descendant of Atahualpa who lived in the town, the most notorious being Don Manuel Soto Astopilco (main cacique of the Seven Huarangas of the province), in addition to suggesting the rebirth of the State of Tahuantinsuyo and its right to the crown. No news was recorded that he tried to invoke possible links with the distant and exhausted Incas of Cusco (mostly more favorable to the Royal Army of Peru). And although the proposal was heard and notified to Torre Tagle, no one in the government of San Martín responded to this request. Which shows that for the Creole oligarchy in the Trujillo Intendancy there was a lack of interest towards the indigenous political Society, for which the successors of the Incas were not considered for any alternative government. Leaving a tacit glimpse that the liberal movement of San Martin could end in a monarchical government, or perhaps a republican one, but in either case, it would be led by the Criollo elite and not by indigenous people, no matter how stately and regal lineage they could make ostentation.

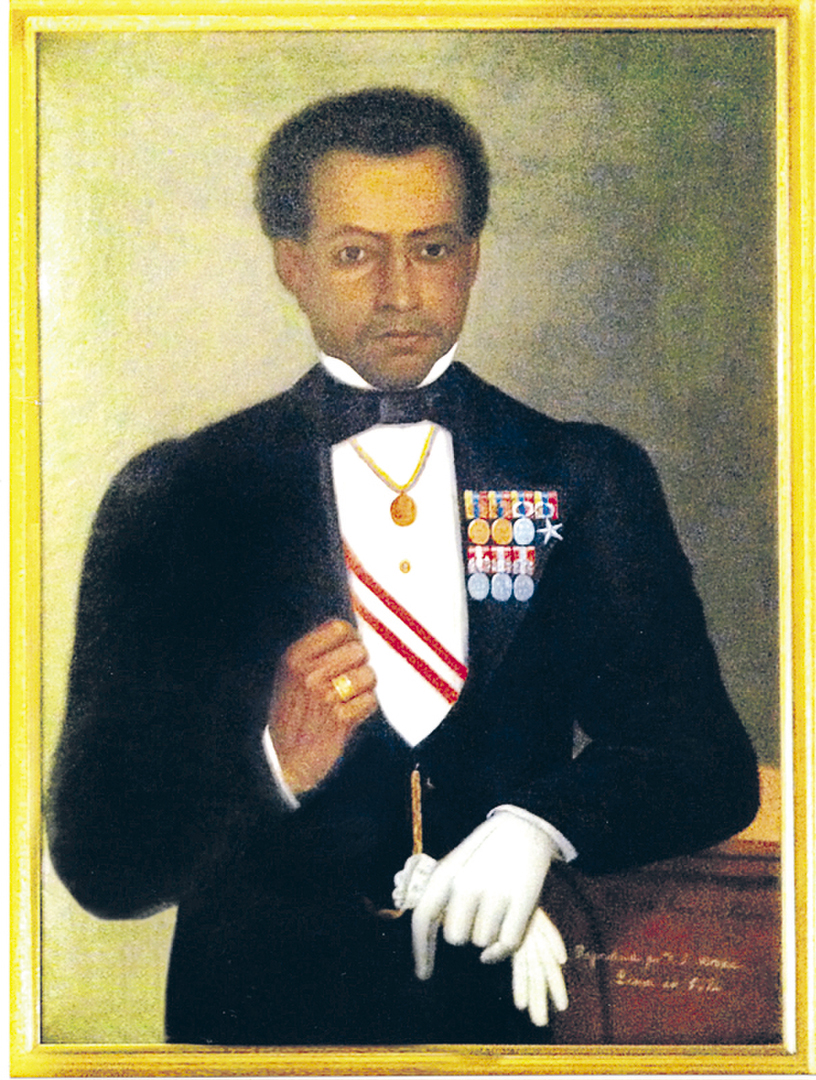
Bernardo de Monteagudo, trusted minister of the Protector of Peru, José de San Martín, who is accused of being a dark figure of liberal fanaticism and with Argentine and anti-Peruvian chauvinist overtones.

San Martín's intentions had been frustrated not only by the irruption of Simón Bolívar in the destiny of Independence, but also by the strong opposition that he encountered among some of the Peruvians themselves, and by the discredit that the errors and nonsense of Bernardo de Monteagudo (an obscure character who, in addition to being one of the main people responsible for the murders of Manuel Rodríguez and the Carrera brothers, was a convinced monarchist), perpetuated as one of the most disastrous characters for the history of the emancipation of America for his radical Jacobin tendencies. Between December 1821 and February 1822, Monteagudo issued a series of resolutions aimed at banishing, confiscating part of their assets and prohibiting the exercise of commerce to peninsular Spaniards who had not been baptized. Although there are no investigations about how many supporters of the king left Peru because of the serious episodes of its independence, as well as the political change itself that they did not want to recognize; some estimates point to between ten and twelve thousand. Ricardo Palma, in his historical study on Monteagudo, estimates the number of Spaniards expelled from Peru by his decision at 4,000 (despite the fact that many of these families were already integrated into the Peruvian nation during the miscegenation process, among them would be the expulsion of the Archbishop of Lima). According to Canadian historian Timothy E. Anna, these actions were "an unparalleled act of violence and unprecedented human rights abuse." It is very certain that this popular unrest was one of the causes for the riots that surrounded the dismissal of Monteagudo on July 25, 1822, since it was perceived, in the feelings of the Lima population of all social classes, as a very unfair act because it is an abuse against Spaniards who had lived in Peru for decades and who had an important social and economic role. According to Scarlett O'Phelan, Monteagudo's measures were about to generate the annihilation of the social group of merchants who were active in very important areas for the Peruvian economy (these being agriculture and, above all, mining). This was due to the fact that the large, small, and medium-sized owners (all expropriated without much difference) were responsible for managing the most vital aspects of the viceroyalty's economy. It is also known that battalions of Argentine origin generated complaints from the civilian population due to the "havoc and exhortations" they carried out on the farms, devastating the crops and even attacking (sometimes seriously injuring) a large part of the members of the Peasant, who worked the land.

All these measures, according to the revisionist perspective, would have been allowed by San Martín, knowing that the loss of a large Peruvian capital would benefit the interests of the United Provinces of the Río de la Plata so that it could project as the industrial leader of the South American continent, to the detriment of the Peruvians, since such a compulsive movement against the Hispanic social groups (who were leaders who organized, maintained and dynamized the productive bases that made the bases of the national economy work) did not take place in Chile and Argentina; thus evidencing that primarily the rivalries present in the regional groups of economic power in Latin America, for which both Chileans and Argentines (whose states financed the liberating expedition with the contributions of their bourgeoisies) had feelings and interests contrary to their regional equivalents in Peru (including the Inca nobility for their royalist tendencies), rather than emanating an idealized Spanish-American fraternity against imperialism.

"In the period 1821–1822, the liberator José de San Martín and Bernardo Monteagudo, his trusted minister, expropriated and squandered the mercantile and economic elite of Lima, without achieving the definitive independence of Peru. Monteagudo had little regard for the level of civilization and the democratic possibilities of Peruvians. His main objective was to eradicate the Spanish threat in independent La Plata and Chile at any cost, including the economic ruin of Peru. He confiscated wealth and other resources to organize local spy networks and covert operations, clearly damaging to gaining the confidence of the local population and their support for the cause of independence.

(…) The kidnapping policy inaugurated by Monteagudo further undermined a weak tradition of the right to property and laid the foundations for politically motivated expropriations. The agricultural and urban properties confiscated from royalist Spaniards and Creoles, mainly in the central coast region, were valued at approximately two million pesos. This policy caused greater economic problems and a drop in investment.

(...) Eventually, most of the expropriated assets were awarded to military officers who sought compensation and rewards for their patriotic exploits. Among the high-ranking officers who received these rewards we have Antonio José de Sucre, Bernardo O'Higgins, and José Rufino Echenique. Juan Francisco Ryes, Blas Sardeña and José María Plaza, among others. In the provinces, local officials repeated the abuses of power and the plundering committed in the name of the patriot cause.

(...) To make matters worse, Admiral Thomas Cochrane (British), whose naval services and expenses had remained unpaid, appropriated the reserves of silver bars that had been painfully and arrogantly accumulated during the government of San Martín. Cochrane was the commander of the Chilean "liberation" fleet and also benefited from the capture and hijacking of Peruvian merchant ships. A French diplomat informed his bosses in Paris that the lack of popular support for freedom and independence was explained by the corruption of the new separatist authorities and their infighting. Another diplomatic envoy attributed the weakness of these nascent governments to the distribution of official positions through protection and intrigue instead of recognition of merit. These weak organizational bases provided fertile conditions for corruption and abuse of power."

— HISTORIA DE LA CORRUPCIÓN EN EL PERÚ [HISTORY OF CORRUPTION IN PERU] (p 104-106), Alfonso W. Quiroz

Later, during the founding of the State of Upper Peru, there were anti-Peruvian sectors in Argentina that saw the independence of Bolivia (and the renunciation of its claims by the United Provinces of the Río de la Plata to the sovereignty of that territory) as something tolerable with to avoid the aggrandizement of Peru (coinciding with Bolívar, Sucre and Santander to avoid restoring the power that Peru had during the viceregal era), which had been a great problem for the commercial and military interests of Buenos Aires during the wars that there was between the Junta and the Peruvian Viceroyalty. Also because it was expected to obtain the support of Sucre and the Bolivian state, together with the support of Gran Colombia, for the War in Brazil, even if that was at the expense of Peruvian interests.

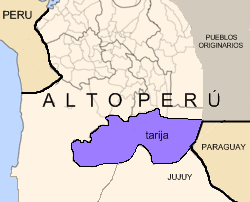
Map of the Question of Tarija that led to a Peruvian-Bolivian-Argentine war during the government of Andrés de Santa Cruz.

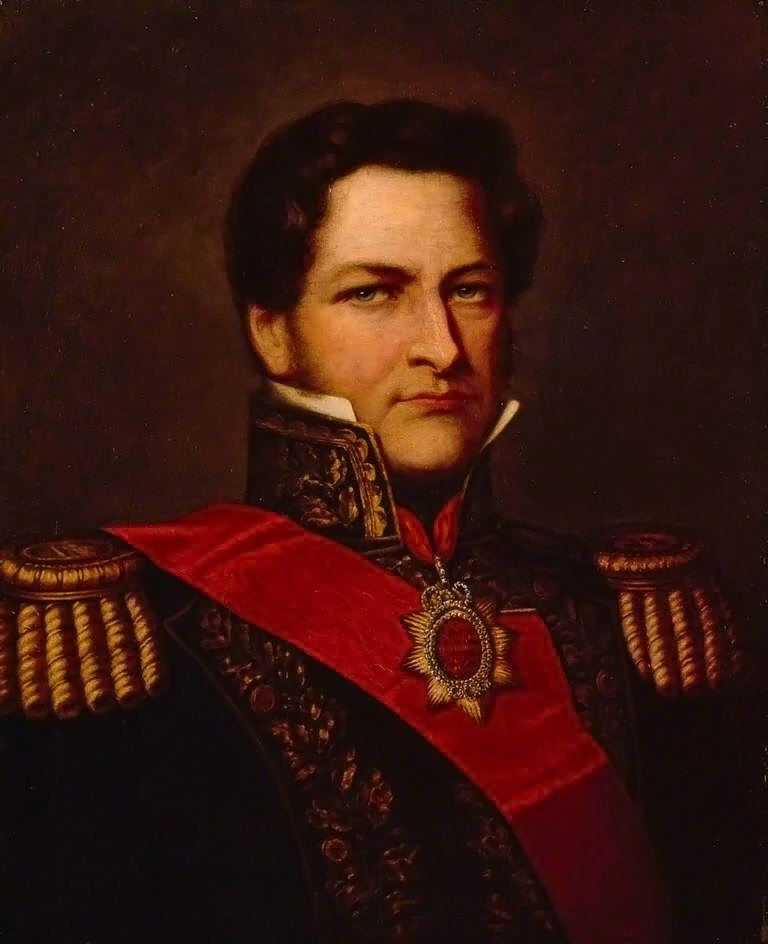
Juan Manuel de Rosas, main leader and caudillo of the Argentine Confederation, who would go to war with Peru.

During the War against the Peru-Bolivian Confederation, relations between the Peru-Bolivian Confederation and the Argentine Confederation had deteriorated, among other reasons due to Bolivian President Andrés de Santa Cruz's support for unitary groups that had carried out at least four incursions since the southern Bolivia to the northern Argentine provinces in the years before the war. This led to anti-Peruvian measures on the part of the Argentine Government, such as that of February 13, 1837, where Rosas declared closed all commercial, epistolary and any kind of communication between the inhabitants of the Argentine Confederation and those of Peru and Bolivia, declaring " traitor to the country" to anyone who crossed the border into those countries. Both confederations did not have formal diplomatic relations, so the declaration was intended to externalize the break in relations between the two countries. Although Juan Manuel de Rosas was not anti-Peruvian, since he would declare war on Santa Cruz and his supporters, but not on the Peruvian states, it can be considered an episode of anti-Peruvianism in the history of Argentina, since the concern that the federal caudillo would have, in front of the power that Peru would be obtaining, in the Manifiesto de las razones que legitiman la Declaración de Guerra contra el gobierno del General Santa Cruz, Titulado Protector de la Confederación Perú-Boliviana [Manifesto of the reasons that legitimize the Declaration of War against the government of General Santa Cruz, Entitled Protector of the Peru-Bolivian Confederation].

"If the prepotency of Peru, if its population and resources were worth, as Santa Cruz has claimed, to justify its policy, the government in charge of Foreign Relations of the Argentine Confederation would seize them to justify the war against the Peruvian Confederation. -Bolivian (...) if there was no balance between Peru and Bolivia, will it exist between the United States and the Argentine Confederation? (...) that fusion under the aegis of a conqueror is dangerous and the propensity of Peru to aggrandize it does not promise Bolivia neither security nor rest."

— Juan Manuel de Rosas

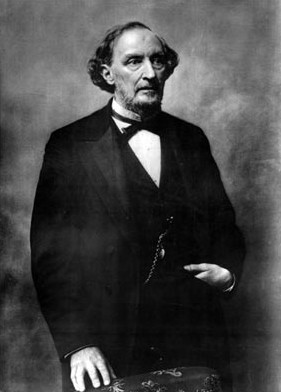
Bartolomé Mitre, Argentine president (of liberal and nationalist ideas) accused of being Europeanizing and with anti-Chilean and anti-Peruvian tendencies.

During the War of the Triple Alliance, Peru was a country that protested against the alleged attempts to conquer Paraguay by the member countries of the Triple Alliance (of which Argentina was a part together with Uruguay and Brazil). For the rest of the continent, this war was perceived as an attempt to conquer and divide Paraguay among the allies. The attempt against the independence of one of the countries of the continent was feared as a terrible precedent for potential geopolitical disorders and possible expansionist projects in the governments of the area, Argentina being very frowned upon in the eyes of Peru. The controversial Secret Treaty of the Triple Alliance was seen in Peruvian diplomacy as a violation of Paraguay's sovereignty and integrity as a country. Thus, the perception of that war was understood, in the public eye, as the arrogance of 3 allied countries that wanted to seize Paraguay's territory and even destroy its sovereignty, generating analogies with the Second French intervention in Mexico or the Spanish-South American War, that happened simultaneously during the 1860s, comparing them as a form of imperialism not different from that of the Europeans. Seen in this way, no distinction was made regarding a conquest, especially of a Latin American country, by an American government or a European government, in the eyes of society, both acts were reprehensible. Peruvian diplomacy based its principles on continental solidarity (product of Pan-Americanism) and the defense of national sovereignty and integrity, especially the Amazonian ambitions of Brazilian interests and their expansionist advances, which were now related to the Argentines. Evidence of the public condemnation of Peru towards this policy of conquest, by the Brazilians and Argentines against Paraguay, was shown in an edition of the newspaper El Comercio, dated 10/8/1866, which responded to accusations of the anti-Peruvian Argentine press that there was a lack of impartiality in the country due to Peru's sympathy with Paraguay. Given this Peruvian support to Paraguayans, Argentina reacted with anti-Peruvian positions, refusing to be a country a member of the Quadruple Alliance against Spain in the War of the Chincha Islands; In addition, the diplomacy practiced by the Triple Alliance sought to separate the Pacific governments (Chile, Peru, Bolivia and Ecuador) and thus dissolve the Quadruple Alliance. Regarding possible profitable differences, Bolivia was definitely the most vulnerable country, being a priority for Argentine diplomacy. Thus, Argentine and Uruguayan agents tried to seduce the Bolivians, telling them that the scope of the quadruple alliance treaty was not justified, while there were Bolivian territorial claims against the Peruvians and Chileans that the Bolivians still feared would not be able to defend them. Argentine diplomacy considered the interference of the Peruvians in the war against Paraguay, as well as in the internal affairs of the Argentine state, as something of less relevance compared to the interference of the Chileans, despite the fact that Peru and Chile collaborated (until end of 1867) against the objectives of the Triple Alliance, which would demonstrate discriminatory conduct of Argentine diplomacy against the Peruvians, portrayed as servile puppets and marionette of the Chileans. Meanwhile, Argentine diplomats came to accuse Chile of meddling in Bolivian politics, manipulating them to carry out anti-Argentine policies; and support the Revolution of the Colorados, carried out by federal opponents of the government of President Mitre.

The dissident press of Argentina and Uruguay (opposed to their governments and in solidarity with Chile and Peru), which questioned the foreign policy carried out by their foreign ministries, was attacked by their respective governments, being restricted and even prohibited from circulating in Argentina. Meanwhile, the newspapers of the Spanish immigrant communities, extolling the action of the Spanish Navy in the South Pacific against the Peruvian and Chilean navies (during the Spanish-South American War), circulated freely in the cities. Argentine, which evidenced anti-Peruvian and anti-Chilean biases. Another example of these biases occurs when analyzing and comparing the newspapers El Mercurio of Valparaíso and La Nación Argentina of Buenos Aires. Although, the 2 newspapers had links with the elites of their countries, and shared the commitment to vindicate the prevailing ideologies in the Criollo oligarchies (economic and political liberalism) in tune with the modernizing trends of the time. They also differed in their points of view to conceive of Americanism, being clearly distant in their approaches. While El Mercurio was totally convinced in promoting the cause of American solidarity, without making distinctions between brother and equal countries, La Nación, for its part, expressed contempt for these excessively fraternal tendencies, invoking the dichotomy between civilization and barbarism as a criterion to privilege before defining the American cause (presenting himself to the civilized Argentine and Uruguayan society as opposed to Paraguayan and Peruvian barbarism), to justify his actions in the war against Paraguay, as well as the repression of the liberal Buenos Aires government to the conservative uprisings through the interior of the country; They also wanted to legitimize the Eurocentric tendencies present in the Argentine elite and their unreserved acceptance of the prevailing social Darwinism, where Peruvian society (and the mestizo heritage in Latin America in general) was frowned upon for not being majority white societies, generating contempt.

Also, during the 1978 FIFA World Cup, it was reported that the Argentine dictator, Jorge Rafael Videla, tried to psychologically frighten the Peruvian soccer team by entering the team's locker room, shortly before the soccer match between Peru and Argentina.

On the other hand, the foreign minister of Peru, José de la Puente, during November 1978, welcomed the Argentine ambassador to Lima, who was an admiral whose objective was to achieve a military alliance between the two countries in case there was a war against Chile. . The Peruvian foreign minister was suspicious of potential anti-Peruvian feelings of the Argentine state based on historical experiences, responding to his offer with the following words:

"You have the bad luck of meeting a man who knows a lot about history (...) While we lost six thousand men and part of the national territory [in the War of the Pacific], you took advantage of the precise moment to peacefully conquer La Patagonia (...) Now you want Peru to enter the war, but later, while Chile and Argentina make up, we lose Arequipa"

In the 20th century, given the significant presence of illegal Peruvian immigrants in Argentina, to avoid their massive expulsion, the governments of both countries agreed to sign a reciprocal Migration Agreement in August 1998, which would make it possible to regularize the situation of Argentine migrants and Peruvians in the host country, granting a period of 180 days for this. The bilateral agreement will recognize the rights of the Peruvian worker in Argentina, but only up to a period of 12 months, after which he must undergo an Immigration Law, which various sectors of the opposition, as well as the Church in Argentina, had described as xenophobic and racist with anti-Peruvian overtones. Another of the institutions that showed a special interest in the migratory situation of Peruvians was the Commission of Peruvian Ladies Resident in Argentina, chaired by Mrs. Carmen Steimann. In a meeting organized by the Peruvian community in Buenos Aires, Ms. Steimann would protest the attitude of the Argentine Gendarmerie, accusing them of carrying out an obsessive and cruel persecution of immigrants, mostly just for being Peruvian and Bolivian.

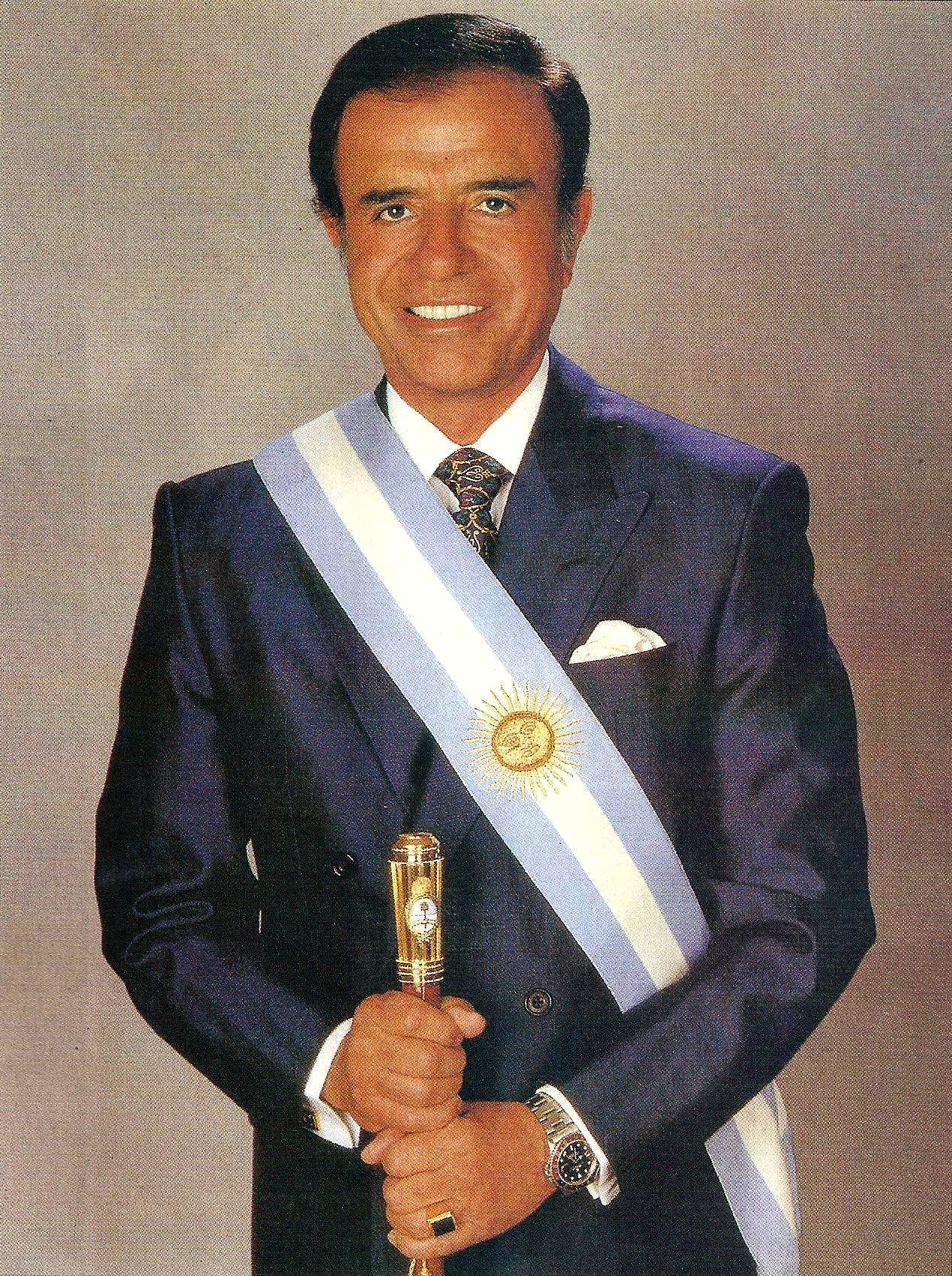
Carlos Saul Menem, president of Argentina that have been accused of anti-Peruvian and traitor to Peru during Cenepa War and Argentine arms trafficking scandal.

In addition, Carlos Menem is often accused of having an anti-Peruvian attitude after selling weapons to Ecuador when it was in a war against Peru, generating another accusation of treason against Peruvians after the help that Peruvians gave to Argentina in the Malvinas War. Between 1995 and 2010, diplomatic relations between Argentina and Peru remained frozen at their lowest historical point. Although later the Government of Argentina ended up expressing its reparation to the Peruvian State for this action. While some Peruvian newspapers concluded that Cristina Fernández had complied with what was morally due to the claims of dignity in Peruvian society with those words, other newspapers considered that this had not been enough, coming to suspect a possible camouflaged anti-Peruvian conduct. Examples of such tendencies could be seen in the newspaper Correo, on whose cover the headline "He did not ask for forgiveness" would appear, later pointing out that "Fernández was very cautious in his speech and only used the word 'reparation' in allusion to the questioned sale of arms to Ecuador". Another case was that of Peru 21, which considered that in reality the Argentine president "almost asked for forgiveness".

Recent cases of anti-Peruvianism were seen in 2000, as the magazine La Primera denounced a "silent invasion" of Peruvians and Bolivians, with a cover illustrating a dark-skinned man with a missing tooth (through Photoshop) to increase the ideological content of the note or in 2010 when the newspaper La Nación denounced an invasion of Bolivians, Peruvians and Paraguayans in Argentina, which unleashed a wave of xenophobic and racist comments from readers.

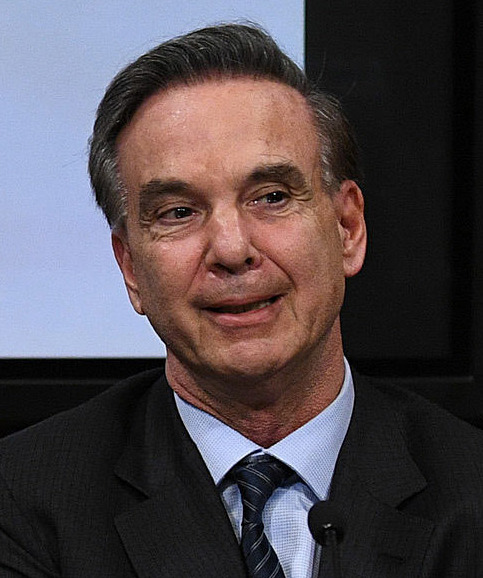
Miguel Ángel Pichetto, Argentine senator who had been accused of have some anti-Peruvian sentiments during Immigration to Argentina.

Controversial statements with anti-Peruvian overtones in some political sectors of the country are also mentioned, such as those of Justicialist senator Miguel Ángel Pichetto, when mentioning that Peru transferred its security problems through the migration of its criminals to Argentina, reaching a generalization that the main towns in the country were taken by Peruvians and that Argentina incorporates all this hangover, the controversy became even greater when even the Government of Argentina agreed with those statements. He also went so far as to affirm that Argentina has become ill for giving a pardon to a deported Peruvian (for having sold drugs) and that second chances should not be given, as well as accusing Peruvians of being responsible for the crimes in the slums. and the drug trade among young people, although clarifying that he did not say it for all Peruvians. Later there was concern, in 2019, of Peruvian diplomats about Pichetto's nomination for the Argentine vice presidency, due to having anti-Peruvian sentiments that could affect bilateral relations between the two countries. Later, in 2020, he declared that the Buenos Aires suburbs are the social adjustment of Peru, Bolivia, Paraguay and Venezuela. It is usually assumed that this xenophobia of Argentines towards Peruvians and other nationalities they have been scapegoats many times for a political discourse that prefers not to assume its own responsibility.

=== Bolivia ===
The Peru-Bolivian Confederation, a project that uncovered certain anti-Peruvian suspicions in the Bolivian population.

Historically, relations between Peru and Bolivia have been cloudy and contradictory, with attempts at reunification and alliances between the two countries due to ethnic and cultural similarities, as well as a series of conflicts that have marked both populations, particularly the Battle of Ingavi, which is seen as the founding war of Bolivia and which has had an impact on the Bolivian imaginary a Peruvian-phobic tendency to see Peru as an expansionist nation that threatens its sovereignty and always opposes Bolivian interests, and a Peruvian reaction to dismiss to Bolivia as the rebel province of Upper Peru that must be annexed, which has generated discord between both peoples, deepened in the actions of their alliance in the War of the Pacific, where they have branded each other as traitors as the reason for their military defeat. All these historical actions have influenced the formation of the national identity in Bolivia with anti-Peruvian overtones.

Anti-Peruvian actions in Bolivia can be traced from the beginning of its creation as a country, in 1826 the Bolivians tried to appropriate Arica, Tacna and Tarapacá, signing the sterile Pact of Chuquisaca with a plenipotentiary of Gran Colombia to negotiate limits and the federation of Peru with Charcas, justifying itself in its historical, economic and geographical affinity and stability, since many believed that the division of the "two Perus" was transitory because the great Andean state projected by the Liberator would soon be established. In Lima the problem was that the delivery of territories had to be immediate, but not the payment of the debt, which caused the chancellor José María Pando and the President of the Governing Board Andrés de Santa Cruz to reject the treaty. They make it clear that they would hand over Arica or Iquique but only for immediate benefits. As for the federative idea, what was agreed established a very weak executive and legislature that would only generate chaos and make them dependent on Gran Colombia to maintain order, denouncing an anti-Peruvianism of part of Simón Bolívar and Antonio José de Sucre. Looking for alternatives, the Upper Peruvians sent the secret "legislative legation", a commission to ask Bolívar to suspend the decree of May 16, 1825 by which Arica was Peruvian, but they failed, since Bolívar did not want to provoke the people of Lima any more.

There is also the anti-Peruvian belief that the War against the Peru-Bolivian Confederation was a Peruvian betrayal of Bolivia due to Bolivian nationalist hoaxes that the opposition of several Peruvians to the Union was motivated by being governed by a Bolivian (Andres de Santa Cruz), and that to avoid it, they ended up allying with Chile to achieve the fall of the confederation. In that same war there was opposition from Bolivians, especially in Chuquisaca to preserve their privileges, when mentioning that the confederate project favored Peru to the detriment of Bolivia by creating 2 Peruvian states (Republic of North Peru and Republic of South Peru) that would generate a disadvantage in decisions by having the Bolivian state 1 vote of 3 (there being a general opposition to what was agreed in the Tacna Congress), Bolivians were already discontent since Santa Cruz had settled in Lima, when he was expected to rule from Bolivian Republic, so he was accused of being a Peruvianphile. Therefore, both the Bolivian opposition to Santa Cruz, as well as the Bolivian defense of the confederation against Agustín Gamarra, was nourished by anti-Peruvianism.

In addition, before, during and after the War of the Pacific, discourses emerged (especially in liberal groups) with anti-militarist, anti-oligarchic, anti-caudillo and anti-Peruvian tendencies, while antimilitarism was related to anti-Peruvianism. While the "guerristas" sought to continue the war and honour the alliance with Peru, the Bolivian conservatives or pacifists sought to achieve a peace agreement with Chile as soon as possible, even if to do so they had to rant against the Peruvians. Justiniano Sotomayor Guzmán's proposal in his letters to Hilarión Daza that "Bolivia has no better friend than Chile, nor worse executioner than Peru." Later, as Paz Soldán recalls, Bolivia (already an ally of Peru since 1873) tried to dispose of Arica and Pisagua, signing treaties with Brazil in 1878. There was also a Bolivian political sector with anti-Peruvian and pro-Chilean tendencies to change sides to the detriment of Peru to free itself from its influence in Bolivia's internal politics, as well as to obtain Arica to compensate for its access to the sea. Later, during the Question of Tacna and Arica, there were anti-Peruvian feelings in Bolivia, because the Bolivian people felt they had a moral right to claim the territory of Arica as their natural outlet to the sea, in addition to considering Peru's claims to recover Tacna and Arica (without giving Bolivia a port) was totally unacceptable and a betrayal of the Peruvian-Bolivian alliance; in the process, multiple insults were developed against the Peruvian community that lived in La Paz. This anti-Peruvian feeling was transferred to the foreign policy of the post-war country, for example, in 1895, Bolivia secret agreements with Chile, providing that Tacna and Arica would pass into the hands of Bolivia after the captivity. From 1902 they also secretly negotiated a peace without sea, until in the 1904 treaty they ceded their coastline to Chile in exchange for concessions and money (7 million pounds of gold), blocking the Peruvian recovery of Arica due to the construction of that railroad. port to La Paz with Chilean administration. In 1919, they even asked the League of Nations —via France— to appropriate Tacna and Arica.

Is also mentioned the propaganda campaigns carried out by the Bolivian press with an anti-Peruvian tendency when it came to border demarcations during the 20th century, for which the Ministry of Foreign Affairs of Peru had to intervene to put pressure on the Bolivian Foreign Ministry in 1938 against tendentious articles that they made Bolivian newspapers in an attempt to challenge the Demarcation Protocol of the province of Copacabana; Bolivian politicians were reportedly involved in this anti-Peruvian campaign, such as the Omasuyos deputy, Eguino Zaballa, who personally participated in the drafting of some articles on the alleged damages that Bolivia would suffer after the signing of the protocol with Peru.

In February 1975, meeting in Charaña, Hugo Banzer and Augusto Pinochet issued a joint declaration that led to the Chilean proposal to give Bolivia a maritime corridor north of Arica, which was impossible while the 1929 Treaty was in force, according to the which Peru has restricted sovereignty and recognized easements over Arica, and must be consulted before any possible change in the sovereignty of the territory. It came to be suspected that this was the rapprochement of a possible anti-Peruvian axis between Chile and Bolivia against another potential military alliance between Peru and Argentina during the Cold War.

With the passage of time, the distinction between pro-Peruvians and pro-Chileans has largely disappeared. Chile now has both Arica and Antofagasta, so Bolivian popular anger is more often directed against Chile. However, the power of the media to scandalize people for an outlet to the sea for Bolivia has retained its vigor over the years, and various politicians in the country throughout history often use it to distract attention from other issues of Bolivian politics, even if it involves anti-Peruvian narratives. Given this, it is loose to brand that Bolivian politicians have had anti-Peruvian tendencies throughout history, such as:

- Andrés de Santa Cruz, who would have had apparent contradictions in his geopolitical projects, due to a highland nationalism, in which he wanted both the reunification of Upper and Lower Peru (in a similar way to the Inca Empire or the Viceroyalty of Peru) as well as to consider dividing Peru into 2 states, one from the north and the other from the south, for the benefit of Bolivia's interests (in addition to recovering the territory of Arica for the benefit of Bolivia), which he envisioned as the "Macedonia of America" and which should have a leadership in the continent, to the detriment of the historical preponderance of Lima and Cuzco as poles of power.
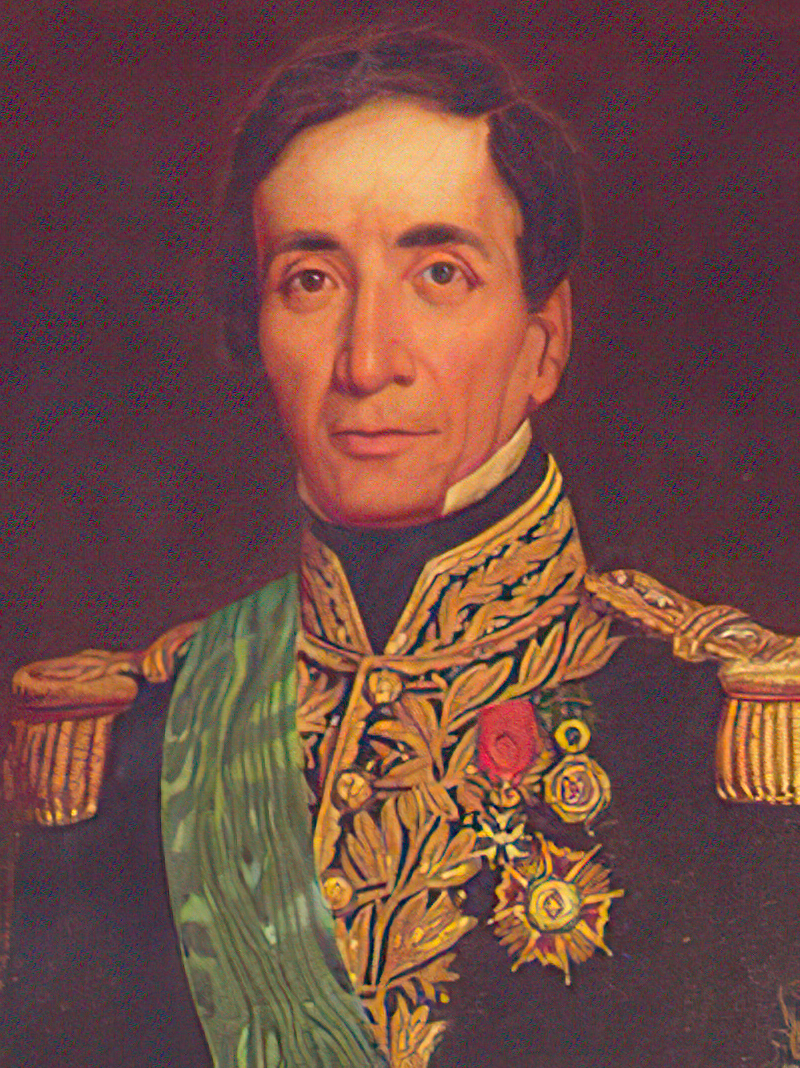
  Andrés de Santa Cruz, very controversial Bolivian caudillo in the history of Peru.
  "When he felt strong, his dreams of power were those of those legendary Incas who descended from the mountains to bring peace, order, and progress to the coast. Then he opened himself to the ideal of 'pan-Peru', of Greater Peru. Bolivia would be the "Macedonia of America". If they beat and humiliated him and cornered him on the plateau, he wanted, not so much for revenge as for security reasons, next to Bolivia, a divided or impotent Peru. His maximum program was a strong Greater Peru and extensive, that is, the Confederation, with him as head. His minimum program was to govern Bolivia, but, at his side, the bifurcation of Peru into two states and the possible fall of the South State under Bolivia's sphere of influence Such is the explanation of his political behavior until 1839. Since then the exclusive approach to Bolivia has been accentuated more and more in his life as an outlaw, and from the depth of his disappointment he has to look at Peru as an enemy country."
  — Jorge Basadre, Reconsiderations on the historical problem of the Peru-Bolivian Confederation
  Despite the defeat of the Peruvian-Bolivian Confederation (where Santa Cruz and other foreign politicians proposed to Chile plans to divide Peru as a sudden measure, without success), Santa Cruz, Orbegoso and many other of their supporters (after being defeated in 1839) took refuge in Ecuador, who planned to organize expeditions to northern Peru, to undermine the Gamarra regime. Santa Cruz, who still held out hope of regaining power in Bolivia (where he still had supporters), continued to plot against Peru from Ecuador (contributing to increase the anti-Peruvian sentiment in that country). Although it was unlikely that he would succeed in reconstituting the Confederation, Santa Cruz had a minimal plan: to annex southern Peru to Bolivia (and, if possible, weaken the northern Peruvian state in the face of an Ecuadorian territorial preponderance). From various letters preserved, it is known that his major plan was to promote an alliance between Ecuador and New Granada to attack Peru. It is therefore not by chance that at that time, Ecuador began its territorial demands towards Peru, claiming Tumbes, Jaén and Maynas. There is no doubt that those who incited Ecuador to make this claim were Santa Cruz and other enemies of the Peruvian government taking refuge in its territory. Since its birth as an independent state in 1830, Ecuador had not had a reason to complain against Peru for territorial reasons and they had even signed a friendship and alliance treaty in 1832, but it was only from 1841 when said nation refloated the old Bolivarian claim of Tumbes, Jaén and Maynas. As Minister Charún said in the negotiations of April 1842: "The question of limits existed long before; however, Peru had not received a complaint from Ecuador; beginning to receive them since the enemies of Peru took refuge in that country".
- José Ballivián, after the War between Peru and Bolivia he executed an anti-Peruvian policy taking advantage of the post-war spirit, however, over time he became unpopular, even the congress refused to declare war again in 1847. Among the actions that executed his government, was to try to conspire against the government of Ramón Castilla, as well as to issue adulterated currency by Bolivia, "el feble", to the detriment of Peruvian merchants in the Altiplano (and benefiting Argentines), in addition to prohibiting exports from Peru. Also, with the help of the Peruvian José Felix Ugayn, he sought to develop a separatist project that sought to annex southern Peru to Bolivia (primarily Moquegua, Tacna, Arica and Tarapacá). Finally, Peruvian-Bolivian relations would stabilize with the Arequipa Treaty of November 1848.
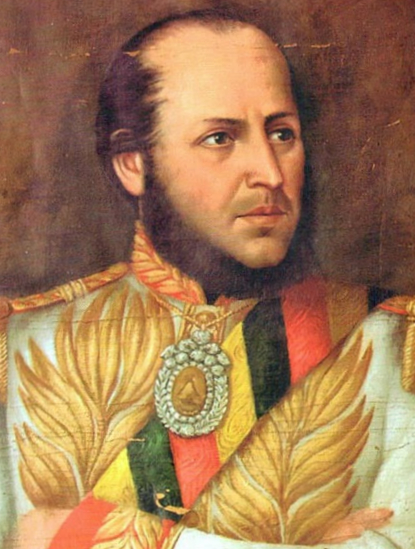
  Jose Ballivian, a Bolivian caudillo and nationalist with anti-Peruvian sentiments.
- Mariano Melgarejo, who during the arrangement of borders with Chile would have considered a proposal by Aniceto Vergara that harmed Peru by ceding its coastline to Chile in exchange for military aid to annex Tacna and Arica (at that time owned by Peru and coveted by Bolivia, because it was considered to its natural outlet for maritime trade since viceregal times), in addition to showing an incessant attitude of wanting to schism with Peru and the Treaty of Alliance. Julio Méndez points out Melgarejo's anti-Peruvianism in his desire to break the treaty, blaming him for of "Austrian intrigues of Chile". In addition, the writer Carlos Walker Martínez, according to what he recounts in his work Páginas de Viaje, that it was too risky to oppose Melgarejo in a drunken state, in which it was recurring to hear his speech about wanting to go to war against the Peruvians and the wishes of reconquer the southern Peruvian territory that Ballivián returned to the Peruvian government after the war between the two countries in 1841.
- Aniceto Arce, a member of the Liberal Party, who after assuming the Vice Presidency of Bolivia and from this position, would come to explicitly proclaim his adherence to the interests of the English capitalists, as well as his anti-Peruvian stance against the war. In a statement he would affirm that "the only salvation table for Bolivia was that it put itself at the forefront of the Chilean conquests". Manifesting, in addition, that Peru was "a nation without blood, without probity and without sincere inclinations to the ally that had agreed to the alliance "with the deliberate and sole purpose of ensuring its preponderance in the Pacific over Chile." Later, the famous writer from Santa Cruz, René Gabriel Moreno, would come out in defense of Arce for coincidences in his anti-Peruvian positions in Bolivian geopolitics. Referring to Campero, Moreno writes «Is it not well remembered that this man shouted War! War! While he was quietly contemplating the war efforts of his ally Peru?». Like Arce, Moreno is clearly opposed to any understanding or pact with Peru and maintains that Argentina, both the government and the people, were leaning in favor of Bolivia, repudiating, at the same time, Campero's strange and provocative attitude.
  Aniceto Arce, spokesman for an anti-Peruvian and anti-militarist faction in Bolivia during the War of the Pacific.
  In Arce's vision, Chile is presented as a vigorous country full of civic virtues that predicted its democratic culture, as well as a Great National Conscience, compared to Peru and Bolivia, weak and in the process of social disintegration due to their lack of modernity. Already in the middle of the War with Chile, Aniceto Arce warned, as the only prospect of peace, an explicit proximity to Chile, turning his back on Peru. The proposal meant breaking the allied front in exchange for the annexation of Tacna and Arica, it meant ultimately betraying the pact made with Peru. Undoubtedly, Aniceto Arce had strong common interests with the British financiers who maintained his headquarters in Chile. He was convinced that the development of Bolivia depended on the help that could be received from those capitalists. For its part, Chile had already seized the nitrate mines, thus rewarding the wishes of English capitalism. Now he saw in "Peru his worst enemy, where the United States began to entrench itself to counteract the English expansion on the Pacific coast." Later, Arce would express his anti-Peruvian sentiment in 1873: "As for the alliance that incessantly has been a very painful concern for me, I declare that I have never linked the slightest hope to it (...) Peru is a nation without blood, without probity and without sincere inclinations towards the ally." It must be assumed that Arce's anti-Peruvianism revealed his affinity for English interests favorable to Chile within the foreign intervention in the Pacific War, since these were both his interests and he also believed they were fundamental to augur the progress of Bolivia through the implementation of free trade and the incorporation of the country into international capitalism. Other Chilean and anti-Peruvian public figures of the time would be Luis Salinas Vegas, Julio Méndez and Mariano Baptista (who was the most prominent supporter of Chilean interests against that of the Peruvians, harshly criticizing the project of the United States Peru-Bolivians).
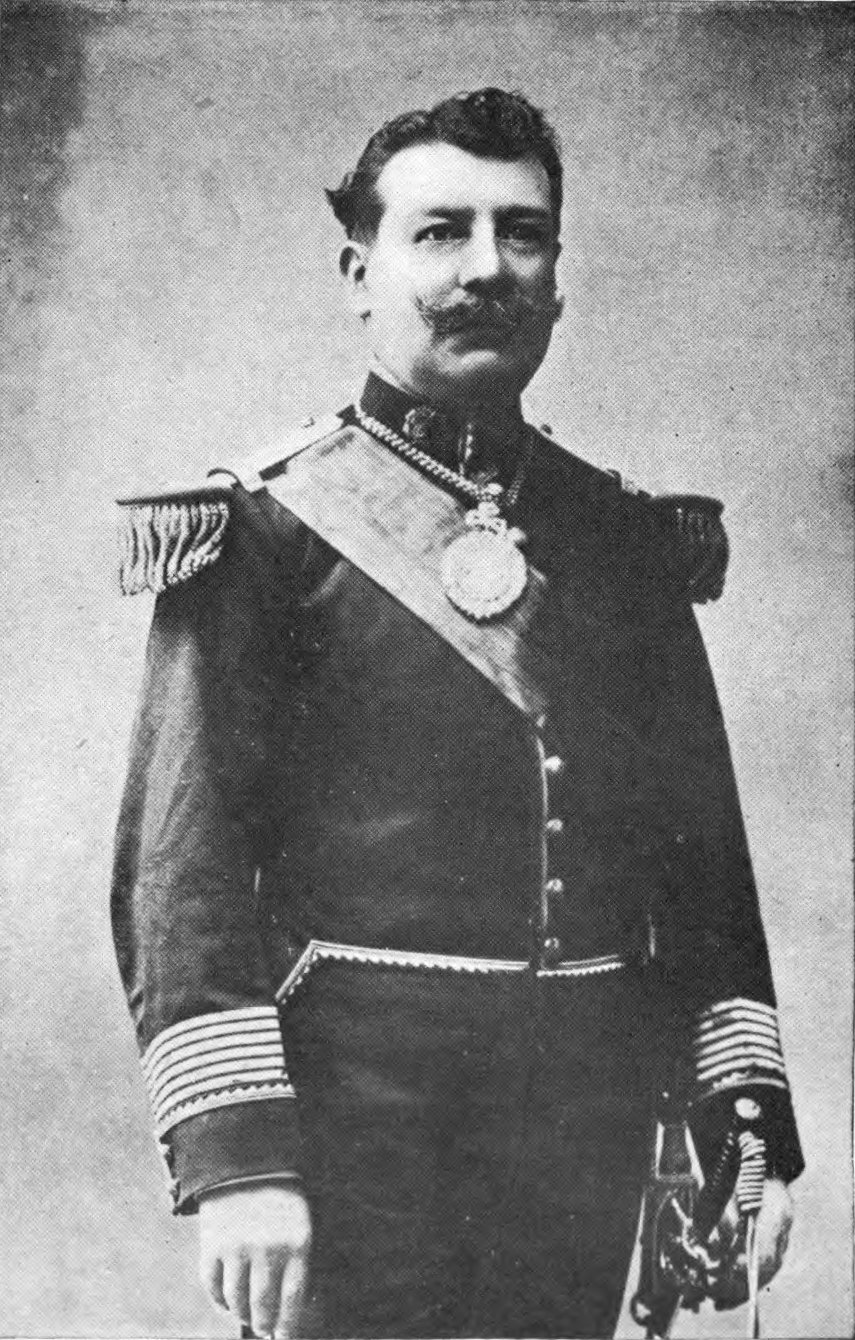
- Ismael Montes, Bolivian soldier, lawyer and politician with anti-Peruvian sentiments to achieve an outlet to the sea for his country
  Ismael Montes, Bolivian president (veteran of the War of the Pacific and the Acre War) who deeply disliked Peru, seeking to carry out a pro-Chilean Realpolitik, in which he sought, with the help of Chile, to intimidate Peru, exerting public pressure, and thus achieve the transfer of sovereignty of Tacna and Arica to Bolivia. This was because he considered that Bolivia's natural geopolitics required obtaining access to the sea through the port of Arica, which was its natural outlet for geographical reasons. Montes sought to reverse the opinion that Bolivians had of their neighboring countries of "Peru good and brother, Chile bad and Cain of America", even if that could generate unreal and ephemeral perceptions. He came to abort integrationist policies of the previous government of José Gutiérrez Guerra (cancelling the promotion of exchange trips between students from both countries), he also developed incidents that agitated public opinion against Peru. After his government ended (although he was still leader of the ruling political party), he supported the Bolivian attempts in 1920 to seek to sue Peru before the League of Nations, through France (being Bolivia's ambassador in that country), to try to obtain the provinces of Arica and Tacna by any means. He later led attacks, with the help of Bolivian government officials, against the Peruvian Legation and its Consulates, as well as Peruvian residents and their property, in La Paz. He even tried, through Darío Gutiérrez (his deputy as ambassador in Paris) to accuse the Peruvian Foreign Ministry of being the true instigator of the incidents.
- Evo Morales, who has had an ambiguous position with the Peruvians during his government, going from promoting a highland brotherhood between both peoples of an indigenous nature, to having positions against Peru due to ideological differences, where relations almost broke during the government of Alan García for his meddling in the internal affairs of Peru, where the Minister of Foreign Affairs of Peru, José Antonio García Belaúnde, accused him of having anti-Peruvian positions even before he was president of Bolivia and of that there is an attempt by Evo to make a historical revisionism to blame Peru for Bolivia's problems, such as its condition as a landlocked country, these strategies of Morales would have sought to replace the anti-Chilean discourse of the outlet to the sea, referring to the use of nationalism for populist purposes of internal politics (since many of these actions were prior to elections that determined their political future). Morales even threatened to denounce Peru before the International Court of Justice in The Hague, because the Peruvian government granted diplomatic asylum to three former ministers of former President Sánchez de Losada, whom Morales described as "criminals", which he later It provoked anti-Peruvian marches in the city of El Alto by leftist movements and sindicalist, who threatened to expel all Peruvian citizens from the country and vandalize the Peruvian consulate if the former ministers' asylum is not revoked.
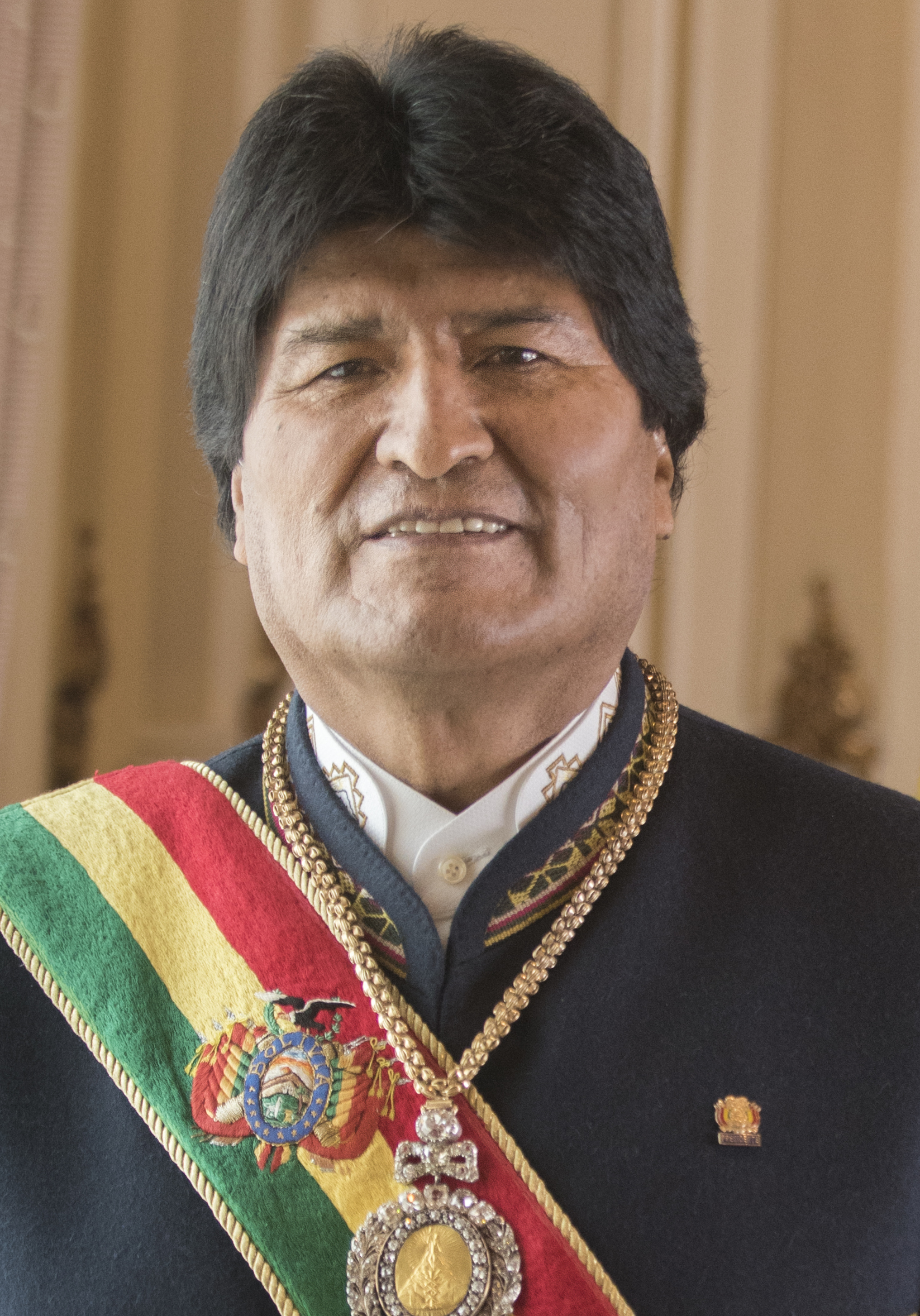
  Evo Morales Ayma, ex-president of Bolivia who were involved in a lot of diplomatical and political conflicts against Peru.
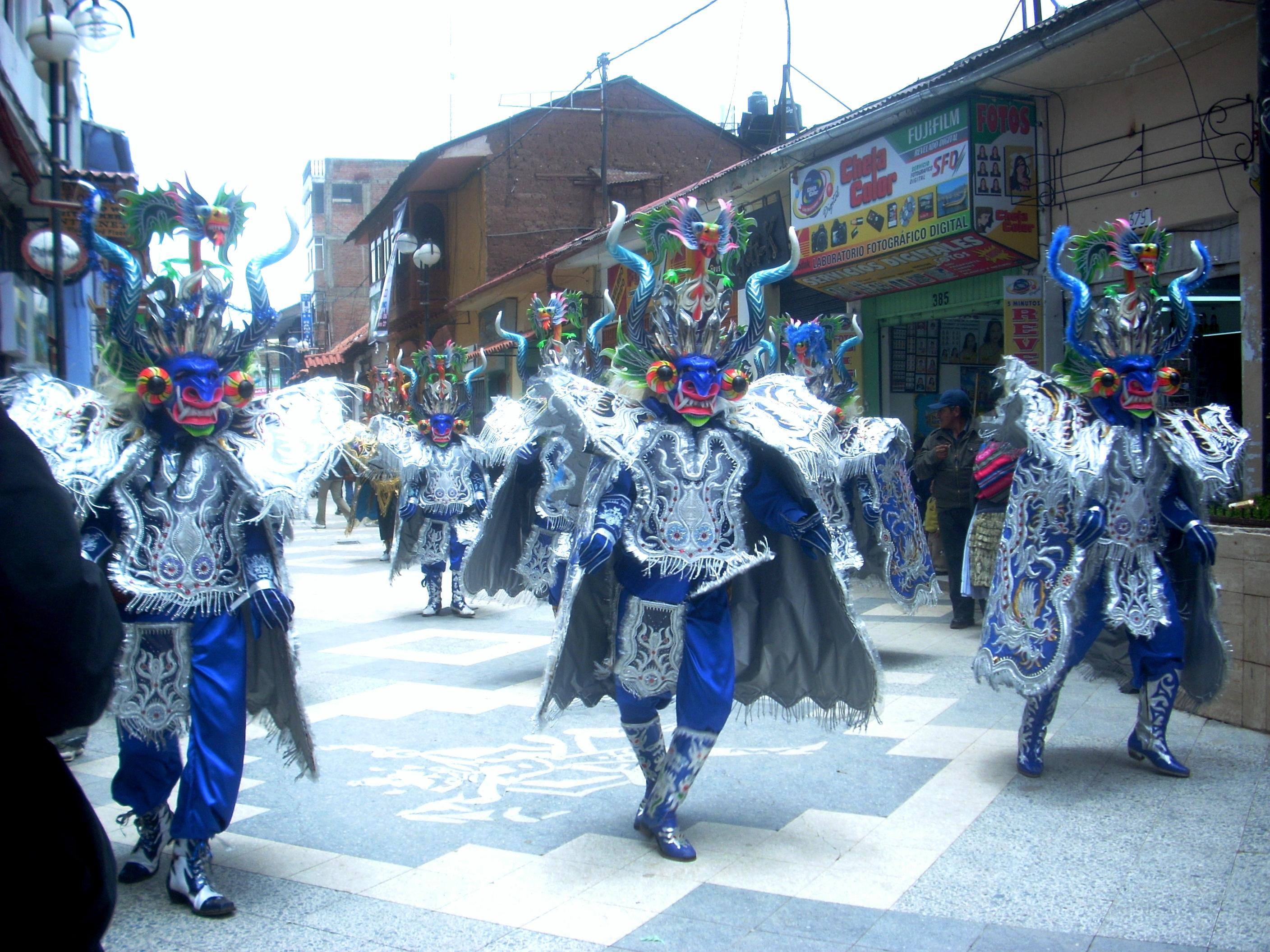
  Peruvians in Puno performing the dance of the diablada, which Bolivia claims as its exclusively national patrimony.
  On the other hand, Morales also accused Peru of wanting to "appropriate" the "cultural expressions" of Bolivia, to the point that the Bolivian Minister of Culture, Pablo Groux, threatened to take the dispute to the International Court of Justice in The Hague because they postulate that the diablada is native to Bolivia and not to Peru. In the following 5 years there were approximately ten complaints of appropriation of Bolivian folklore. The issue came to touch the national pride of both countries and fueled an anti-Peruvian position in several Bolivian nationalists opposed proposals to consider them bi-national. In addition, Evo went so far as to affirm that the demand of Peru in The Hague against Chile, due to the maritime delimitation controversy between the two countries, had the objective of blocking Bolivian aspirations for an outlet to the sea (through a corridor on the land border between Peru and Chile), stating that he had information in which the Peruvian Government "knows that the lawsuit is going to lose it. They know it: they made the lawsuit to harm Bolivia." All this set of actions meant that the Peruvian Foreign Ministry had to deliver ten protest notes to its counterpart in Bolivia, since Morales does not respect the rules of conduct that must govern between heads of state. Subsequently, some nationalist sectors in Peru denounced Evo for having claims to carry out a geopolitical project that seeks control of copper, lithium and uranium, as well as an outlet to the sea for Bolivia, to the detriment of Peru. Also, the action of the members from his political party (Movimiento al Socialismo), like the actual presidente of Bolivia (Luis Arce) prompted a formal "vigorous protest" by the Peruvian Foreign Ministry, which accused the Bolivian government of "interference" in Peru's internal affairs, specially during the end of Pedro Castillo government.

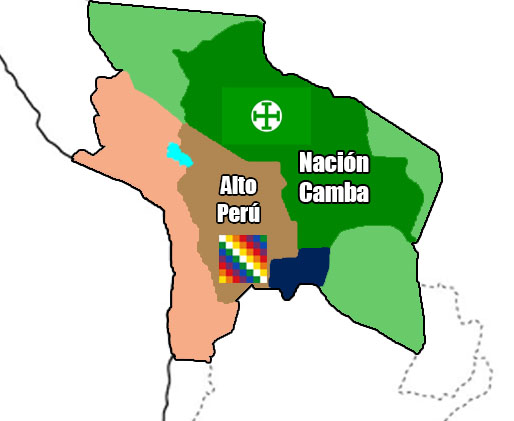
Map disseminated in Camba nationalist groups to denounce Upper-Peruvian colonialism.

Currently, in camba nationalist groups in Santa Cruz de la Sierra (like Movimiento Nación Camba de Liberación), there has been an opposite vision to what they accuse of colla domination of Bolivia, and in favor of a secession from the Camba homeland or at least greater autonomy of eastern Bolivia within the State. For this reason, they try to distance themselves from the concept of Upper Peru (interpreted as something purely Andean) and that they associate as belonging to the Collas, accused them of realize an "Upper-Peruvian neocolonialism" in Bolivia, which has promoted indirectly an anti-Peruvianism within the most radical sectors, due to the similar ethnic composition between southern Peru and western Bolivia due to their common altiplano-historical past.

In addition, a very particular anti-Peruvian xenophobic sentiment had been developed in Bolivia (motivated more for reasons of citizen security than for reasons of job offers), for which Peruvians have been accused of "importing advanced techniques to commit crimes" and of always generating an increase in crime in the regions where they settle, the belief being widespread that almost every Peruvian is a potential criminal. That anti-Peruvian climate was pointed out by Catholic priests such as Father Julián Suazo. It has been suspected that the Bolivian police themselves have a responsibility in promoting anti-Peruvian xenophobia, trying to blame Peruvians for the increase in crime (in instead of Bolivia's internal problems), as well as not efficiently preserving the human rights of Peruvian migrants in the face of outrages. For example, Colonel Javier Gómez Bustillos of the Bolivian Police (markedly anti-Peruvian) would have carried out attacks to Peruvian citizens in May 2001, and despite this, he continued to receive the protection of his government and his institution, who would have promoted him to the best positions in his institution instead of making him answer to the law. The Bolivian press and The media would have helped the development of this current of anti-Peruvian opinion, getting it to position itself in the Bolivian masses, by giving great emphasis in its programs to criminal acts carried out by Peruvian migrants, including the most serious crimes such as drug trafficking and those related to subversion. The death of a Peruvian soldier, the sailor Juan Vega Llana, also contributed to the latter, due to the fact that he was assassinated, in a central street of La Paz, by Peruvian people (classified as subversive) who were members of the terrorist group Sendero Luminoso, who They sought revenge for the Massacre in the prisons of Peru. These fears of subversive Peruvians were also fueled by the widely publicized kidnapping, together with the collection of a ransom of 1,000,000 dollars, of the Bolivian businessman and politician Samuel Doria Medina; a fact that was carried out by Peruvians (also classified as subversives) members of the Tupac Amaru Revolutionary Movement (MRTA). All of which were events that generated a very bad reputation for Peruvians among Bolivian society, being incited by said prejudices and stereotypes by the morbidity of the press. Despite everything, Bolivian institutions report that, in the prison population of in that country, it is not a reality that the number of Peruvian prisoners is proportionally greater than the Bolivian citizens sentenced to prison.

The Commission for Human Rights and Pacification of the Congress of the Republic of Peru has come to examine multiple cases of aggressions and mistreatment in Bolivia, against Peruvian citizens, including Congresswoman Susana Díaz, after a trip to Bolivia, verified the excesses committed against Peruvian groups, coming to denounce that there is an "anti-Peruvian phobia", especially in the Desaguadero.

=== Chile ===
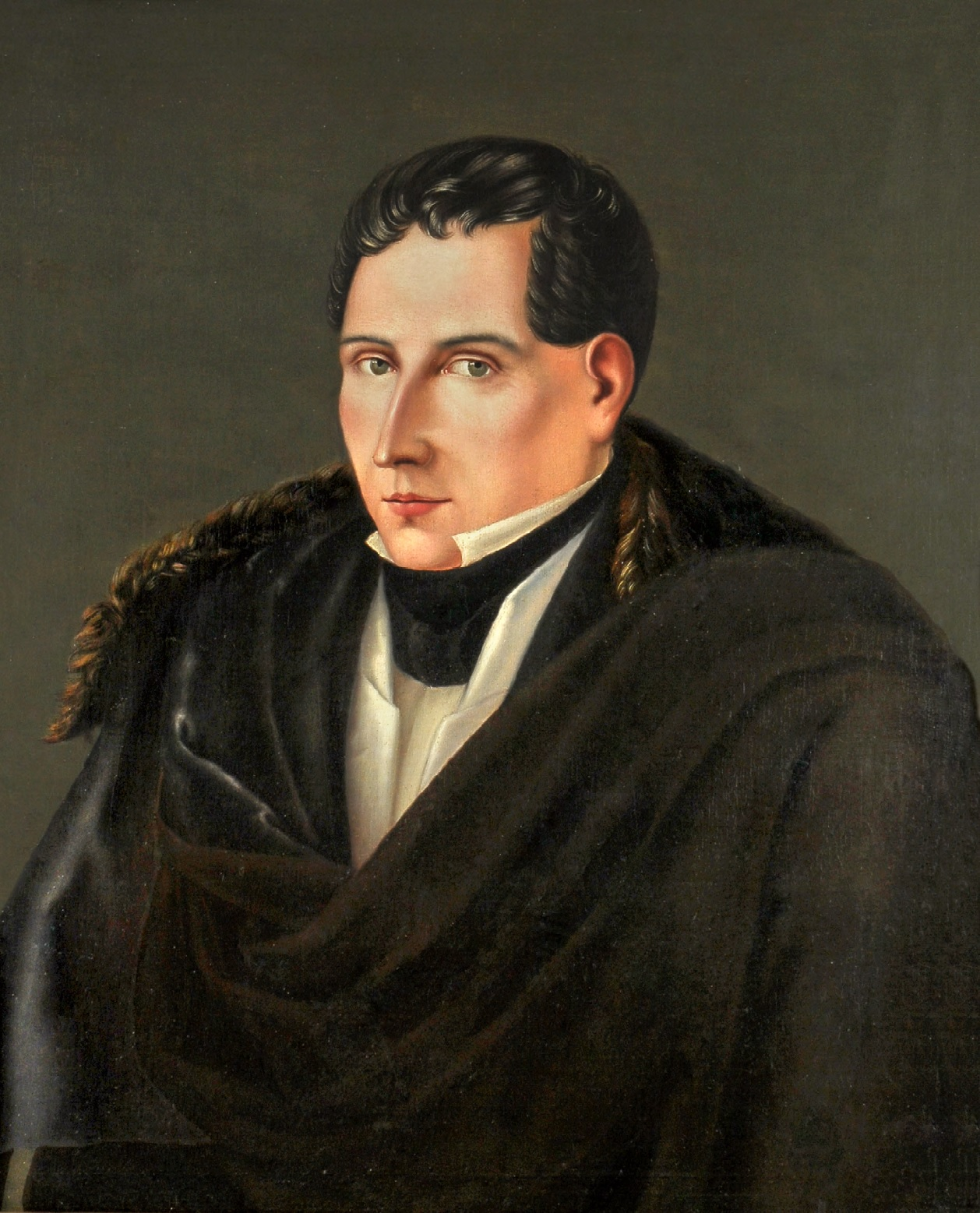
Diego Portales, Chilean conservative politician whose geopolitical doctrine was markedly anti-Peruvian.

In Chile, there is a history of an unfriendly policy with Peru since the commercial rivalry between Callao and Valparaíso during colonial times, beginning a geopolitical project after its independence, the "Doctrina Portales" (formulated mainly by Diego Portales), being the Chilean most iconic anti-Peruvian policy, a geopolitical formula that influenced a lot in Chilean nationalism and Armed Forces Intellectuals. Is based that, to consolidate itself as a great power in the Pacific, Chile must oppose to the development of Peru, based on the danger that this country represented for the sovereignty and development of Chile and South America.

"(...) Chile's position towards the Peru-Bolivian Confederation is untenable. It cannot be tolerated either by the people or by the Government because it is tantamount to their suicide. We cannot look without concern and the greatest alarm, the existence of two peoples, and that, in the long run, due to the community of origin, language, habits, religion, ideas, customs, will form, as is natural, a single nucleus. United these two States, even if it is only momentarily, will always be more than Chile in every order of issues and circumstances (...) The confederation must disappear forever and ever from the American scene due to its geographical extension; for its larger white population; for the joint riches of Peru and Bolivia, scarcely exploited now; for the dominance that the new organization would try to exercise in the Pacific by taking it away from us; by the greater number of enlightened white people, closely linked to the families of Spanish influence that are in Lima; for the greater intelligence of its public men, although of less character than the Chileans; For all these reasons, the Confederation would drown Chile before very soon (...) The naval forces must operate before the military, delivering decisive blows. We must dominate forever in the Pacific: this must be their maxim now, and hopefully it would be Chile's forever (...)”.

— Letter from Diego Portales to Blanco Encalada, September 10, 1836.

So, to position Chile as the leader of the South Pacific, and for this, a cautious policy had to be followed regarding the hegemony of other competitors in its area of influence, such as Spain (which led to the Liberating Expedition of Peru and the Chincha Islands War) or Peru (which led to several conflicts such as the War against the Peru-Bolivian Confederation and the War of the Pacific). It should also be mentioned that the battalions of Chilean origin became infamous for the acts of looting and excesses that they caused Peruvians during the war of independence, becoming notable for all kinds of crimes.

There are indications that this Chilean geopolitical formula of having Upper Peru divided from Lower Peru would have already been glimpsed even before Diego Portales made it official as a norm of the Chilean State. For example, the Chilean diplomat, Don Manuel Egaña, wrote then, regarding the founding of the Republic of Bolívar:

Hence, for the security and prosperity of Chile, the separation of Upper Peru is absolutely convenient, both from the Provinces of the Río de la Plata and from the former Viceroyalty of Lima, and that by forming an independent State it provides us with these two advantages:

1° decrease the preponderance of each of those States, and

2° being the center (Bolivia) weakened by the forces of both (Argentina and Peru)".

— Manuel Egaña

The first indications of this policy for the domain of the South Pacific occurred in the Conquest of Chiloé. After the first Chilean attempt to annex the archipelago failed, Simón Bolívar (Peru's dictator at the time), eager to curry favor with the Peruvian elite, began to consider sending an expedition to bring it under the sovereignty of Lima, based on the uti possidetis iuris (because Chiloé was under the direct administration of the Viceroyalty of Peru, and then, to this republic corresponded the territory), before Spain negotiated and ceded the island potentially to the United Kingdom or France, powers that were known to be interested in that territory, or the Chilotas attempted an expedition to some region of the South Pacific. For the Chilean government, having Bolivarian troops to the south and north (in 1825, after the occupation of Upper Peru, the forces of Bolívar went on to seize all the territory north of the Loa) was considered a threat to their sovereignty. For the same reason, Bolívar's offer to form a joint expedition that would include 2,000 Colombian soldiers was rejected. Finally, the ruler of Colombia and Peru would demand that the Freire government end the threat that royalist Chiloé posed to South America or annex it to Peru (Bolivar was willing to renounce Peruvian claims to the territory to avoid strengthening Peru economically). Meanwhile, a Chilean squadron set sail on November 15, 1824, to help in the blockade of Callao, commanded by Vice Admiral Blanco Encalada, who had learned of the intentions of Bolívar and other Lima authorities to annex the southern archipelago due to their old ties. with Peru, when he landed with his fleet in Quilca on January 6, 1825, so in June he decided to return to Valparaíso with the Chilean fleet to report that the island should be conquered as soon as possible, even if that was to the detriment of the interests Peruvians.

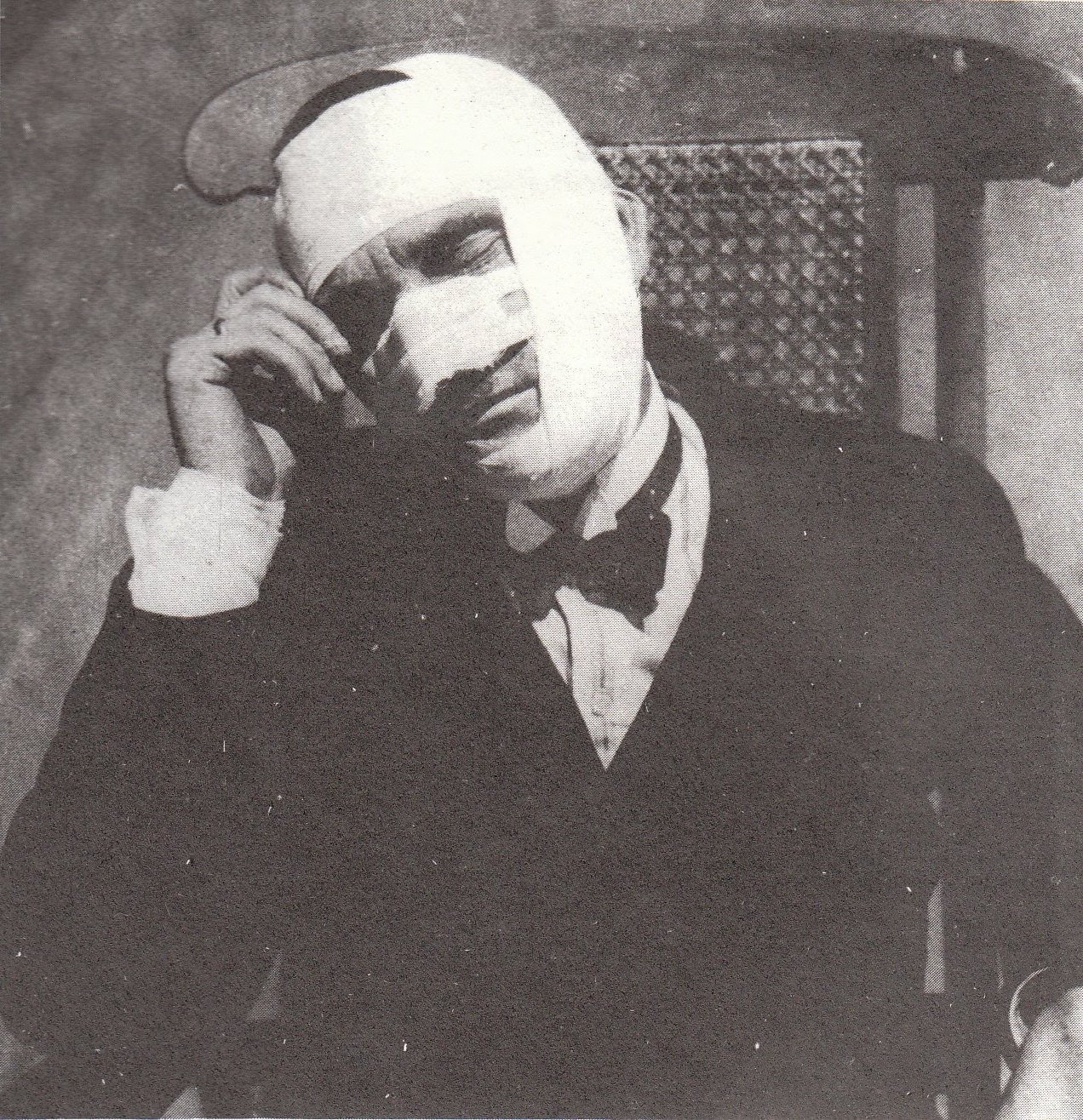
Jorge Basadre, Peruvian historian, wounded by a stone on the forehead by Chilean groups opposed to the plebiscite in Tacna and Arica.

Later, the Portales doctrine would be applied when Chile intervened in the War of the Confederation on the side of the United Restoration Army. However, from the beginning the Chilean press clarified that the war was against Andres de Santa Cruz and not against Peru, therefore, this anti-Peruvianism is particularly associated with the War of the Pacific, a war between Chile and the Peruvian-Bolivian alliance, which began in 1879 and culminated in the loss of Bolivia's access to the sea and the Peruvian territories of the province of Arica and the department of Tarapacá in favor of Chile. In addition, during the Occupation of Lima, there were plans to disappear Peru as a state, under the formula of Annexation or anarchy, which tried to base itself on anti-Peruvian brains, accusing Peru of being a country populated by an inferior race of "rebels by profession.", being an idle, effeminate, cowardly and anarchic people, which is therefore incapable of governing itself; while the solution to Peruvian instability was to annex the Chilean nation, made up of a privileged, progressive and civilizing race, of European extraction. Having consequently an extremely anti-Peruvian policy during the occupation of Tacna, where there were several aggressive altercations with the native population in the Chileanization of Tacna, Arica and Tarapacá. At that time, the Ministry of Foreign Affairs of Chile was assumed by Mr. Agustín Edwards Mac Clure, a person with marked anti-Peruvian sentiments, who from the beginning of his administration came to intensify Chile's "strong hand" policy in Tacna and Arica, renewing the Peruvian protests.

The anti-Peruvian riots and attacks, as well as their anti-Chilean counterparts, constantly harassed the diplomatic missions of the countries, which is why several cities in Chile began to rearticulate the patriotic leagues, nationalist organizations responsible for much of the xenophobic violence that was unleashed against Peruvians and Bolivians residing in the country in the country that had annexed the provinces where they lived. According to Arnold McKay, former US consul in Antofagasta, Chile activated three strategies to achieve that objective. He founded Ligas Patrioticas, clandestine organizations inspired by the Ku Klux Klan, which expelled prosperous and influential Peruvians and Bolivians. He maintained strict censorship of Peruvian newspapers. Since 1918, he prescribed the appearance of resident or passing foreigners to register their fingerprints and show their nationality cards to the police. This measure arose to exclude extremists from the country, but in fact it served to find out how many Peruvians and Bolivians were in the area. From 1918 to 1922, the Chilean State and population were exposed to a real and fictitious "danger from the North". The nationalist feeling of the leagues was mainly marked by a fundamental anti-Peruvianism. The journalist and diplomat José Rodríguez Elizondo maintained that from that moment on, a relationship with Peru was consolidated in Chile, inspired by mistrust and prejudice, where the Chileanization carried out by the Patriotic Leagues would be the definitive establishment of mass nationalism, almost Chilean chauvinism, which "led to exalt xenophobic features, fundamentally anti-Peruvian". This perspective, with its nuances, became accessible to many sectors beyond Tarapacá, such as the embarrassing event of Don Ladislao's War, in which accuse of "sold out Peruvian gold" anyone who questioned the action of Minister of War, Ladislao Errázuriz, of mobilizing troops from Santiago to the north, in a farce to attack a fictitious Peruvian enemy, while in reality he wanted the army away from the capital (due to its proximity to the candidate Arturo Alessandri Palma). In addition, innumerable newspapers, starting with the newspapers and magazines of the mainstream press (El Mercurio, El Diario Ilustrado, El Chileno, Zig-Zag and Sucesos), shared a similar idea of the conception of the homeland. In Congress, this thought full of Peruvian-phobic prejudices was personified by the Balmacedista deputy, Anselmo Blanlot, who would end up propagating the idea that the anti-Peruvian violence in the north was truly "imaginary attacks." Peru was seen as barbarism and Chile, it was supposed, light and civilization. Other politicians with anti-Peruvian tendencies were Agustín Edwards Mac-Clure, Víctor Eastman Cox or Rafael Edwards Salas.

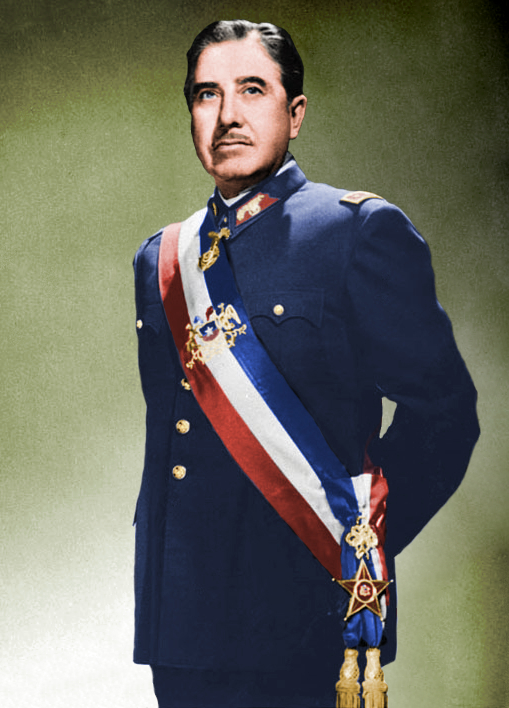
Augusto Pinochet, during his dictatorship there were some strategic moves of anti-Peruvian tint in the midst of military tensions.

Later, in the 1970s, there was a high possibility of conflict between Chile and Peru, between Chile and Argentina, and between Peru and Ecuador, which were feared that they would become entangled in a war on a continental scale. During the government of the dictator Augusto Pinochet, there were tensions between the two countries, due not only to the geopolitical rivalry in the South Pacific and the nationalist sentiments of both countries, but also due to certain ideological differences between the right-wing Pinochet regime and the leftist regime of the Peruvian dictator, Juan Velasco Alvarado, in the framework of the Cold War, to whom the Chilean military leadership attributed a determined military will to recover the provinces of Arica and Tarapacá before the centenary of the War of the Pacific, even before the Coup de State against Allende. There is a record of at least 2 occasions in which Pinochet came to seriously consider the idea of starting a preventive war against Peru. In 1974, Pinochet summoned the General Staff of the National Defense of Chile to analyze the possibility of attempting a massive military attack on Peru (preventing the Peruvians from attacking first), however, he only obtained the support of the Army, but not that of the Navy or Air Force, whose officers feared the Peruvian military superiority of back then. There were attempts to achieve friendly rapprochement between the Chilean regime and the Bolivian dictatorship of Hugo Banzer Suárez, to find a solution to Bolivia's landlocked nature, to ensure its neutrality, or even win its support from this country, in case there was a war against Peru. Through the Charaña Agreement, signed on February 8, 1975, both countries reestablished their diplomatic relations, interrupted since 1962. However, the agreement failed to advance due to additional demands from Peru, now under the command of the dictator Francisco Morales Bermúdez, since its territorial interests of Peru were intentionally violated. Instead of this agreement in its original version, Peru proposed that the territory be administered simultaneously by the three countries, however, both Chile and Bolivia refused to accept this complicated agreement, so Banzer again decided to break relations with Chile on March 17, 1978. On another occasion, the Peruvian Intelligence service obtained information that the Pinochet government was preparing a threat of war with Peru, as a way to end the internal problems of his regime. In 1976, the possibility of launching a preventive war against Peru was even evaluated, according to a dialogue he held that year with the then US Secretary of State, Henry Kissinger, during the meeting of the General Assembly of the Organization of American States in Chile during that year. However, Kissinger made it clear that the position of the United States would depend on who started the conflict. However, he assured that the United States would oppose Peru if it had Cuban support, though that remained speculative. Meanwhile, Pinochet carried out border mining to prevent an invasion; For this, some 180,000 anti-tank and anti-personnel mines were installed on all the borders of Chile between 1975 and 1990, in addition to promoting the development of chemical weapons to use them against the Peruvian Army. On the other hand, the Ecuadorian military, which had received material support from Pinochet (now as senator for life in Chile) during the Cenepa War with Peru in 1995, they honored him with a series of decorations.

In addition, some historiographical currents of Chilean origin, have fallen into some anti-Peruvian biases when analyzing historical events of continental and South American impact, for example, the works of the Chilean Gonzalo Bulnes: Historia de la expedición libertadora del Perú (1817–1822), and Bolívar en el Perú: Últimas campañas de la independencia del Perú, are described by Raúl Porras Barrenechea as "anti-Peruvian" for tending to emphasize foreign intervention in the Independence of Peru and belittling Peruvian perspectives about the event. Also, through the analysis of Chilean history school textbooks in 2010, Parodi proposed a model to understand how the relations between Chile with Peru and Bolivia are perceived in national education, by which Chile assumes the subordinate role and Peru and Bolivia, the role of subordinate nations. Chile's self-perception is characterized by attributions of: civilization, economic development, political order, successful national project and ethnic homogeneity with a predominance of white-western. On the contrary, the perception of Peru-Bolivia includes the attributions of barbarism, economic underdevelopment, political chaos, failed national projects, predominance of the indigenous and ethnic heterogeneity. This would imply in Chile an ethnocentric and unfavorable attitude towards the outgroup made up of Peru and Bolivia. Examples of this would be the historical narratives of the Chilean politician and orator, Benjamín Vicuña Mackenna, who spread the civilizing discourse that tried to justify the violence committed in the War of the Pacific and contaminated with anti-Peruvian sentiment. It is also known that there has been a tendency among Chilean essayists and historians to condemn the pro-Peruvian Americanists in the Spanish-South American War, accused of having been naive politicians who they were detrimental to national interests, when a pragmatic attitude should have been taken and not meddle in the Peruvian conflict of the Chincha islands due to an unrequited idealism by all the American nations (which would even isolate Chile, like the countries of the Triple Alliance). An example of this anti-Peruvian current with this historical episode is the work of Francisco Antonio Encina in his book Historia de Chile (1938–52), which has been seriously criticized by historians in the academic environment for a lack of scientific rigor. Oscar Espinosa Moraga, his disciple, would have spread and developed this anti-Americanist current, becoming the most widespread opinion among the population.

According to the Chilean intellectual José Rodríguez Elizondo, "what there is in my country is a great ignorance about Peruvian culture that, in addition, reinforces the prejudices that are at the base of chauvinism." In addition to political issues, there are historical disputes in the cultural field, such as the origin of pisco, a grape brandy, which each nation recognizes as its own. The second government of Michelle Bachelet was described as taking an anti-Peruvian position in the terrestrial triangle controversy to distract the Chilean public opinion of the Caval case where relatives of Bachelet are being investigated.

It has also been affirmed that during the Peruvian Immigration in Chile there has been a small Peruvian-phobic attitude on the part of the Chilean population. This is evidenced by means of exploratory investigations of an anti-Peruvian discourse in the dimension of Chilean daily life, for which they presented samples of anti-Peruvian discourse of urban circulation (such as graffiti and photographs) and cybernetics (such as some exchanges taken from Internet sites); expressing representations of anti-Peruvianism in the dimensions in relation to the level of development, culture and physical appearance. Regarding the evaluation of the mutual images that are presented in Peruvian and Chilean blogs on the Internet, multiple manifestations of strong hostility, which contribute to support the validity of the expansionism-revanchism dynamic in the mutual images between Chile and Peru.

=== Ecuador ===
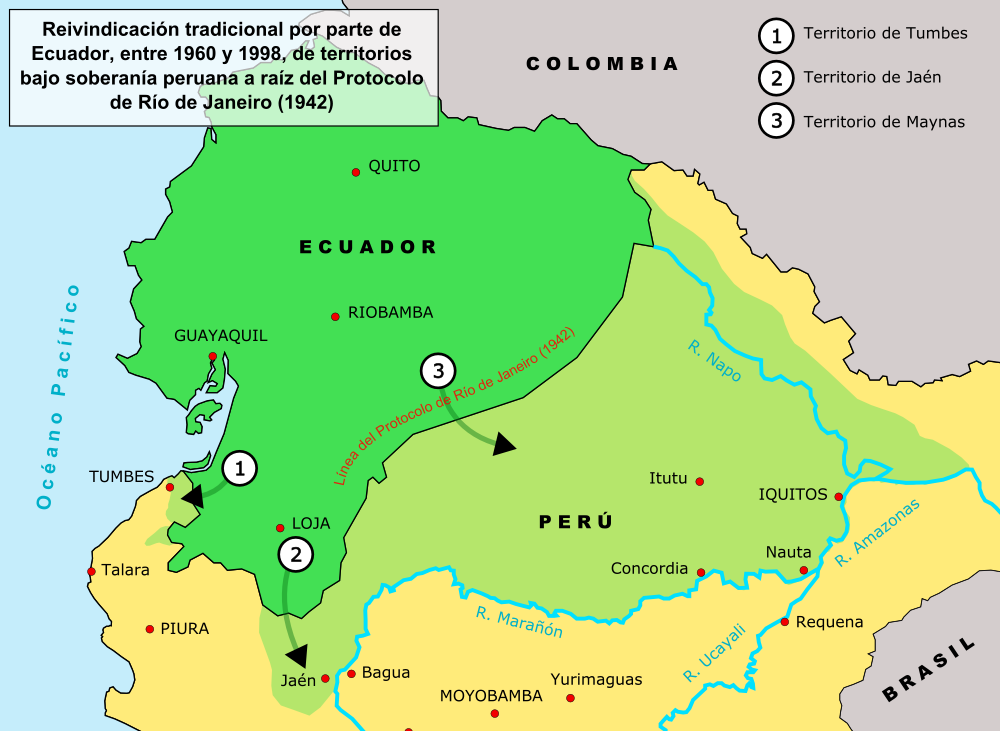
Claims of Amazonian territory in Ecuador against a Peru accused of expansionism.

In Ecuador, anti-Peruvian sentiment is mainly related to irredentism due to the Gran Colombia–Peru War and the border conflict between the two countries. According to former ambassador Eduardo Ponce Vivanco, the violent anti-Peruvianism cultivated in Ecuador is comparable to the anti-Chileanism that subsists in a minority in Peru. The Ecuadorian government came to describe Peru as the "Cain of the Americas" due to its border disputes, in the first years after the signing of the Rio de Janeiro Protocol on 29 January 1942, a treaty that established the borders; in the Ecuadorian streets, phrases such as "Peruvian imperialism" were read. The governments of José María Velasco Ibarra, León Febres Cordero and Jaime Roldós Aguilera had an openly anti-Peruvian position.

"The signing of the Protocol of Rio de Janeiro in January 1942 was processed in the consciousness of the urban masses -stricto sensu-, not only as a historical fact of territorial confinement, but as a psychic and physical mutilation also assumed in individual terms. The painful saying that for decades has been repeated in school classrooms would already say: "Yellow, blue and red: the flag of the patojo." From 1941, being Ecuadorian would imply being handicapped and a loser, which will deepen the identity conflict of the Ecuadorian mestizo: if before he was incomplete, imperfect or chulla because he fled from his roots, now he was incomplete or patojo because he was facing reality."

— Quintero and Silva (2002a:456)

In addition, Peruvian historians, such as Germán Leguía and Martínez, have accused Ecuadorian historians of a well-documented and marked anti-Peruvianism when trying to minimize the role of the pro-Peruvian party in Guayaquil, headed by Gregorio Escobedo, during the Independence of Ecuador. Between Them would be included Pio Jaramillo Alvarado, Óscar Efrén Reyes (who would criticize the Peruvians of Saraguro, Cuenca, Loja and Guayaquil, provinces with populations that sought to annex Peru at the beginning of the 21st century, as hindrances to the national unification of Ecuador in Gran Colombia of Bolívar) and Pedro Fermín Cevallos. A certain tendency of the press of the time to fall into anti-Peruvian positions has also been documented, as an example are newspapers that satire and mock the monarchist doctrines of the Royal Army of Peru while justifying the arbitrary annexation of Guayaquil, another case are the newspapers Ecuadorians who belittled the death of the Peruvian caudillo José de la Mar compared to that of the Venezuelan Simon Bolívar.

Ecuador's territorial conflicts with Peru date back to the first days of independence, since the construction of the borders of the states through respect for the principle of Uti Possidetis Jure, that is, the borders imposed by the colonial administration on their respective legal-administrative entities (viceroyalties), had the problem of ambiguity for this area for the year 1810 and the existence of a royal decree of the year 1802 transferring these territories from Quito to Peru; Given this, they agreed to submit the matter to the arbitration of the King of Spain (even tripartite proposals with Colombia were considered).

During the Peruvian-Ecuadorian War of 1858–1860, the figure of Gabriel García Moreno was accused of promoting, in his conception of Ecuadorian patriotism, anti-Peruvianism, Catholic fanaticism and rancor towards the soldiery. The development of a certain Ecuadorian anti-Peruvianism, something clearly known in Chile and in Peru itself, prompted Chile, through the diplomat Joaquín Godoy, to try to open a "second front" to Peru in the War of the Pacific. The deep political-social divisions, as well as those between Guayaquil and Quito, prevented such an alliance from materializing (due to pro-Peruvian tendencies in Guayaquil society), however, it helped to crystallize the idea of an anti-Peruvian axis of Chile-Ecuador.

At the dawn of the 20th century the situation was explosive. In June 1903, an armed conflict had already occurred between Ecuadorian and Peruvian troops in Angoteros, in the Napo River region. At the beginning of 1904, Ecuador was interested in making a common front against Peru. According to the Peruvian historian Jorge Basadre, the Ecuadorian plenipotentiary in Rio de Janeiro would have proposed that the Brazilian baron of Rio Branco accept the cession of part of the territory that his country disputed to Peru so that Brazil could obtain an exit to the Pacific, the cession was mainly considered from Tumbes. Naturally, such territorial expansion could only be obtained by a war that, in truth, was not in the Baron's plans. The crucial point for him was just to guarantee possession of Acre without making new concessions to Peru.

After the arbitration award of the King of Spain, who at that time was the Bourbon Alfonso XIII, faced with the prospect of a war between Peru and Ecuador, which would have caused the ruling, refrained from the Peruvian-Ecuadorian tension of 1910. The violent anti-Peruvian demonstrations in Ecuador and anti-Ecuadorian demonstrations in Peru, the mobilization of forces in both countries, everything made us hope that the armed conflict would break out in 1910, had it not been for the intervention of the United States, Brazil and Argentina. The hostilities between the two do not cease, which leads Ecuador in 1910 to establish a defensive alliance with Colombia, giving it 180,000 km2 of the Amazon area for payment, in exchange for strengthening a possible anti-Peruvian alliance between the two. A gesture that Colombia would betray in the eyes of Ecuador by ceding in 1922 to Peru, the common enemy, half of the territories ceded by it.

In the middle of the 20th century, the degree of hostility would have increased to the point of a first armed confrontation in 1941, prompted by a seizure of Peruvian Amazonian territories at the hands of the Ecuadorian army, particularly the rubber zone. During the 2nd Peruvian-Ecuadorian War, the Porotillo Massacre broke out, whereby the Peruvian platoon, commanded by Alfredo Novoa Cava, was massacred in Cune by Ecuadorian troops on September 11, 1941, leaving only one survivor (the captain's nephew); This event, carried out in full truce, filled the Ecuadorian chiefs and officers with pride due to strong anti-Peruvian feelings, but not all the soldiers that made up the Ecuadorian detachment, who felt terrified by the fact that their superiors celebrated as one " victoria" a crime against humanity. In addition, a violent anti-Peruvian campaign developed in the Ecuadorian press, newspapers and radio broadcasters became very contemptuous and very hostile street demonstrations against Peruvians were encouraged, attacking the Peruvian Consulate in Guayaquil. The way of carrying out this action by Ecuador, in numerical inferiority and with a fleet of weapons, quickly resolved the conflict in favor of Peru with serious consequences in terms of building national identity.

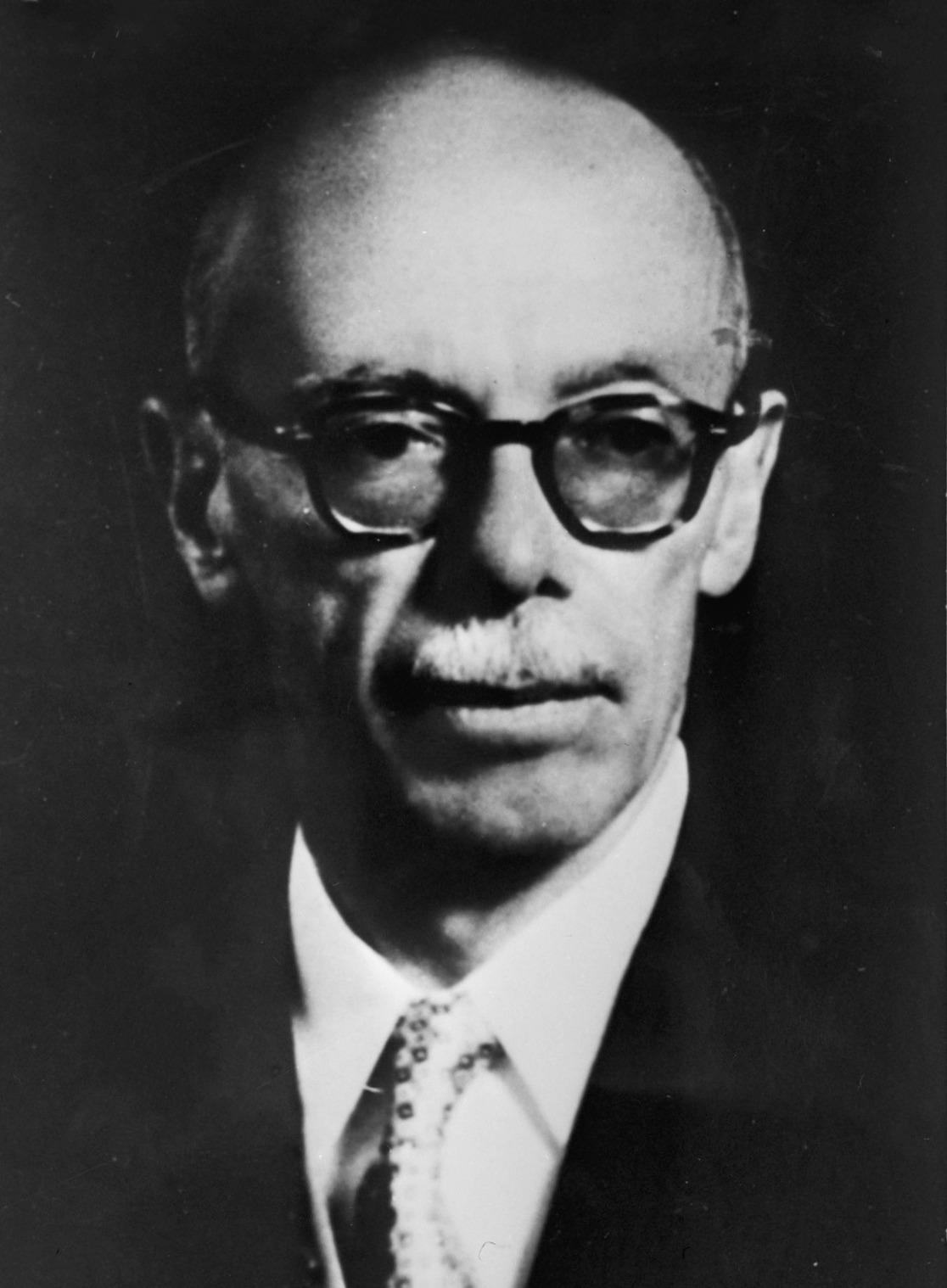
José María Velasco Ibarra, populist president who promoted anti-Peruvian chauvinism to win the support of the Ecuadorian military caste and achieve the country's national unity.

The ruling classes and "owners" of Ecuador worked to generate awareness in the masses about the act of aggression for which it fell equally on the government and on the people; what would be in the words of Cairo: "territorialist indoctrination of populations", based on borders that did not respond to legal reality. During the 1950s, this preaching would be reinforced and thus became a State policy that, in a certain way, unified the consciences and the national soul of Ecuadorians in an anti-Peruvian feeling for an imaginary territorial integrity. Ecuador and its people only had to take refuge in a doubtful border line of an equally doubtful Pedemonte-Mosquera Protocol of 1829. This negative awareness was included in basic education textbooks, reaching the point of locating its roots in the clash between Huáscar and Atahualpa, justification for which anti-Peruvianism acquired a historical rationality. In accordance with the above, the hegemonic meaning of national construction in Ecuador has been permanently related to the obsession with territorial integrity derived from the wars with the Peru. Anti-Peruvianism, expression of the existence of the other, would be an essential component element of what some have called "Ecuadorianness", generating biased interpretations about the times of the expansion of the Inca Empire, currently considered, like Spain. imperial, as imperialist invaders that attacked the essence of being Ecuadorian and that frustrated the Realm of Quito, through the interference of its neighbor to the south (whether as Incas or as a Peruvian viceroyalty) in the historical development of the construction of the nation. The military forces, pressured by the conflict with Peru, have developed their own defense and national security doctrine. The notions of sovereignty, integrity and national unity have been a hard core in the military imaginary that would ideologically influence the white and mestizo elite of the modern Ecuadorian nation-state. After the Cenepa War and the signing of a definitive peace, it has been claimed that the Ecuadorian State has a duty to change the teaching of the history of its country, eliminating from school textbooks the multiple elements of anti-Peruvianism that have been taught for decades. future generations of the country, putting an end to the falsehoods that distorted the Ecuadorian national consciousness, to improve Ecuador-Peru Relations.

The vision of Ecuadorians about Peruvians was analyzed by Durán Barba in 1992. The results obtained, from a national sample, showed that the majority of those surveyed considered that Ecuadorians are more intelligent, hard-working, courageous, prepared and honest; as well as less violent and false than the Peruvians. Most of those questioned denounced a bias of preferring to trade with people from Colombia than with those from Peru. Those prejudiced against Peru were proportionally more numerous in citizens older than 53 years, and minors in those between the ages of 18 and 27, as well as in the lowest social strata, including the educational level without access to primary education provided by the Ecuadorian State. The intensity of anti-Peruvian prejudice was lower in the better informed groups, and higher in those with less information about Peru. In short, 74% of those surveyed showed aversion towards Peru. In addition, regarding the image of Peru in Ecuadorian education textbooks, these were later analyzed by Malpica and González in 1997, whose analysis evidences the psychosocial facet regarding derogatory judgments and adjectives against Peru in school textbooks, under the form of epithets that point to Peruvians as the cause of all Ecuadorian ills, and showing themselves as the "enemy to be eliminated." Concluding that a "victimization" of Ecuador is taught based on the accusation against the Peruvian state of an expansionist will against Ecuador, as well as attributing to Peruvians a series of denigrating stereotypes that foster resentment towards Peruvians and a "desire to revenge". Proof of all this was given by the President of the Ecuadorian Congress, Samuel Belletini, who came to declare on August 24, 1993, that his anti-Peruvian sentiments were the product of the education received, that he could not change them and that he ratified in them. It was also accused, by Peruvian diplomacy, that Ecuadorian politicians incited an anti-Peruvian warmongering policy to win easy votes.

This anti-Peruvian sentiment through history in Ecuadorian nationalism were sintetyzed by the words of Paco Moncayo (Ecuadorian politician and militar):

"In a country devoid of national consciousness since its very foundation in 1830, and torn by intense regionalism and the rivalry between the cities of Quito –capital city–, and Guayaquil –economic nucleus of the nation–, anti-Peruvianism became the only pole of attraction capable of uniting all Ecuadorians, although in Peru a general feeling of anti-Ecuadorianism perhaps never took root –with the exception of Iquitos and the northeastern regions bordering Ecuador, paradoxically the same territories over which the Ecuador insisted on claiming as its own"

— Paco Moncayo

=== Venezuela ===
Bolivarian Chavismo and its supporters have declared their contempt for the Peruvian government for, according to then-Venezuelan Foreign Minister Delcy Rodríguez in 2017, supporting "Venezuela's intervention in the world" due to the creation of the Lima Group. It has also been increased by the Venezuelan authorities, such as President Nicolás Maduro describing Peru as having an "imperialist mentality" and "lifelong anti-Bolivarian" for not being invited to the VIII Summit of the Americas held in Lima due to the crisis in Venezuela.

Likewise, during the Peruvian Immigration in Venezuela, many Peruvians, as well as Ecuadorians and Colombians, were subjected to discrimination and xenophobia by the Venezuelan socialist government, who used the adjectives "Indian" and "guajiro" to refer to immigrants from these countries.

Anti-Peruvianism has also intensified in the Venezuelan population, which has a negative perspective against Peruvians due to accusations of xenophobia during Venezuelan Immigration in Peru, and which has generated a belief that Peruvians have been ungrateful to Venezuela after welcome them during the Peruvian exodus from the time of terrorism. Many anti-Peruvian prejudices and stereotypes have also been shown among Venezuelans, where they accuse Peruvians of being ugly people and the face of Indians, affirming that their migrants come to "improve the race".

It is also often accused that figures of the Venezuelan government have had anti-Peruvian tendencies, and some historical figures of the colonial era, being some such as:

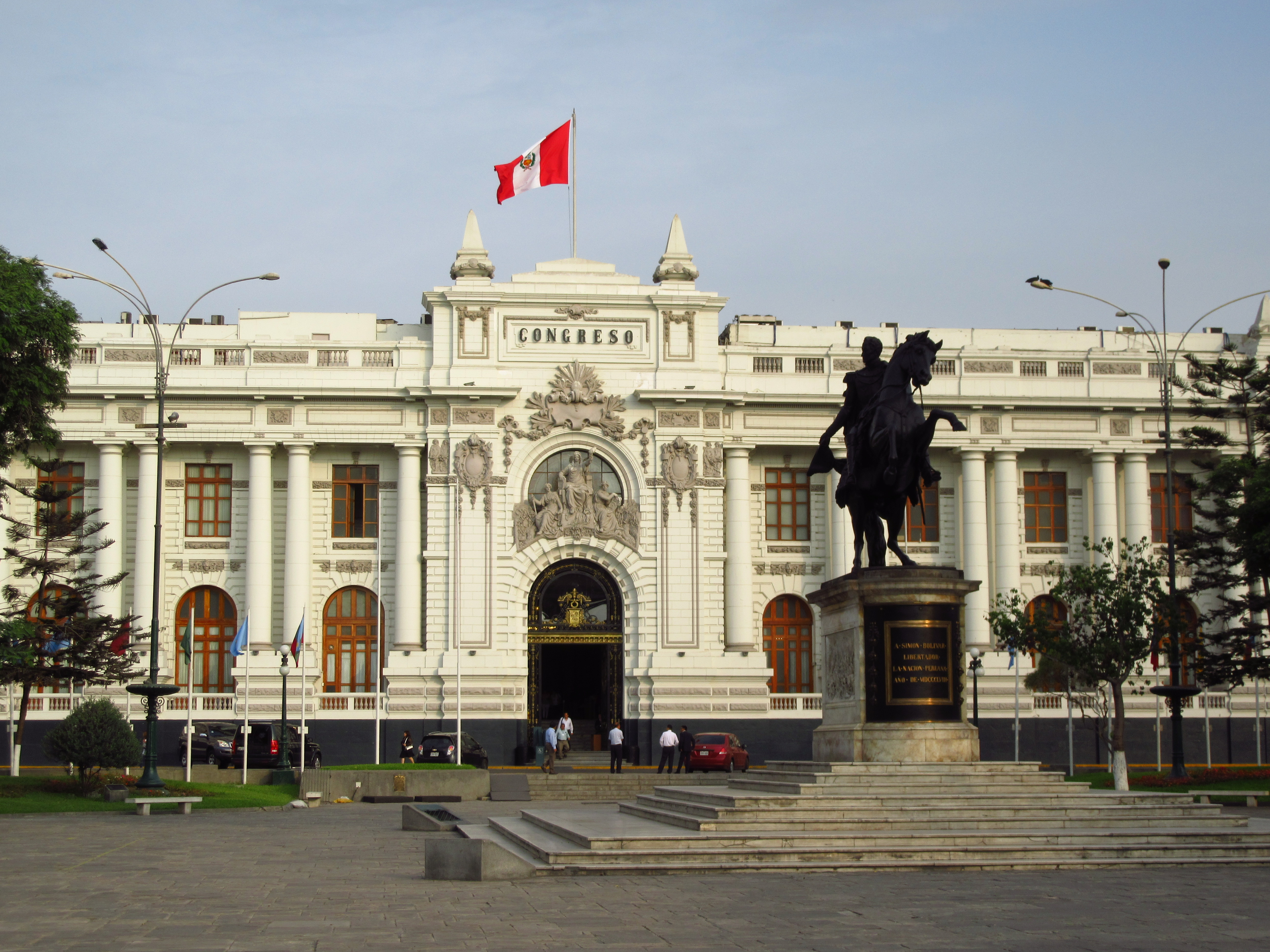
- Statue of Simón Bolívar in front of the Legislative Palace of Peru, a highly controversial Venezuelan character due to his actions in the history of Peru, accused of idealized anti-Peruvianism.
  Simón Bolívar, who during his dictatorship in Peru would have wanted to perpetuate himself in power against the Peruvian will through the Lifetime Constitution, in turn carried out repression against several Peruvian politicians to favor his personal project of the Federation of the Andes, In addition to being accused of having written a Peruvian-phobic letter to Santander on January 7, 1824 (in Pativilca), where he referred to Peruvians and Quito people as Indians (in a derogatory way) and inferior to the Venezuelans.
  "I think I have told you, before now, that the Quitos are the worst Colombians. The fact is that I have always thought so. The Venezuelans are saints compared to those evil ones. The Quitos and the Peruvians are the same thing: vicious to the point of infamy and base to the extreme. The whites have the character of the Indians, and the Indians are all truchimanes, all thieves, all liars, all false, without any moral principle to guide them. Guayaquileños are a thousand times get better"
  — Simon Bolivar, January 7, 1824.
  It is also denounced that he used to constantly insult Peruvians in private letters, accusing them of barbaric people for their lack of affection for republican ideas, in addition to admitting that he used to give false compliments to Peruvian politicians, to manipulate them so that they do not interfere with his Bolivian Federation project (in the largest project of the Great Homeland), as well as showing indifference to Corruption in Peru, or even encouraging it among the caudillos to weaken Peru (even seeking its total disarmament under the pretext financial insufficiency):

"(...) The Empire [Federation of the Andes] will come true, or there will be a deluge of blood in America: therefore I entrust you with energy and perseverance. What do you have to fear from the imbeciles of Peru? Don't you already have the consent of Gamarra and La-Fuente? Aren't our friends the owners of the council of that cabinet, don't they have a majority in lodge 5, aren't they protected by our squad, and guaranteed by my power? Leave me alone with the plainsman Paez, and with these doctors from Bogotá; working well over there, I answer for the event. Meanwhile, that government destroys the liberals under the guise of anarchists. (...) When you see those pusillanimous Gamarra and La-Fuente look pale before the anarchists, ask them to take their cockade for a few days: when they fear too much, authorize them to take a million dollars divisibly from the Peruvian funds. pesos that I'm sure will take making you conceive, which is a good viaticum for an escape.The central idea to threaten them, is the empire, and its immovability. Flatter Gamarra, telling him that he gets the best Duchy, for being the richest, the most civilized, and the most extensive from Santa to the Apurimac: there cannot be a better division. Besides, to La-Fuente, U. says the same thing with respect to his Duchy from Apurimac to Desaguadero; and keep between them, and Eléspuru continuous jealousy. With that seductive idea of perpetuity in their destinies, free from the oscillations of anarchy, we have destroyed that weapon of territorial integrity that would make them work with disgust. Entertained in this way, they will not know the double intention of adding the Duchy of northern Peru to Colombia; although the empire must be one and indivisible (...) Let your main care be that you disarm the Peruvian Force, and the civic, the veteran and the squad. To carry it out, there is the ostensible pretext of the celebrated peace, and of the ruin that the treasury of Peru would experience from the maintenance of an unnecessary army. You know the need to employ people addicted to me in destinations; so you intervene for them together with that government. It is unnecessary to warn you not to allow the accession of any other, who is not a good Colombian, near Gamarra and La-Fuente, because it could happen that they would open their eyes about their political situation, and in truth, that if in that If there were a conversion of political ideas in the cabinet or currently a mutation of the government, everything would be lost. And what would our luck then be?"

— Bolívar's letter sent to General Tomas C. Mosquera, 1826

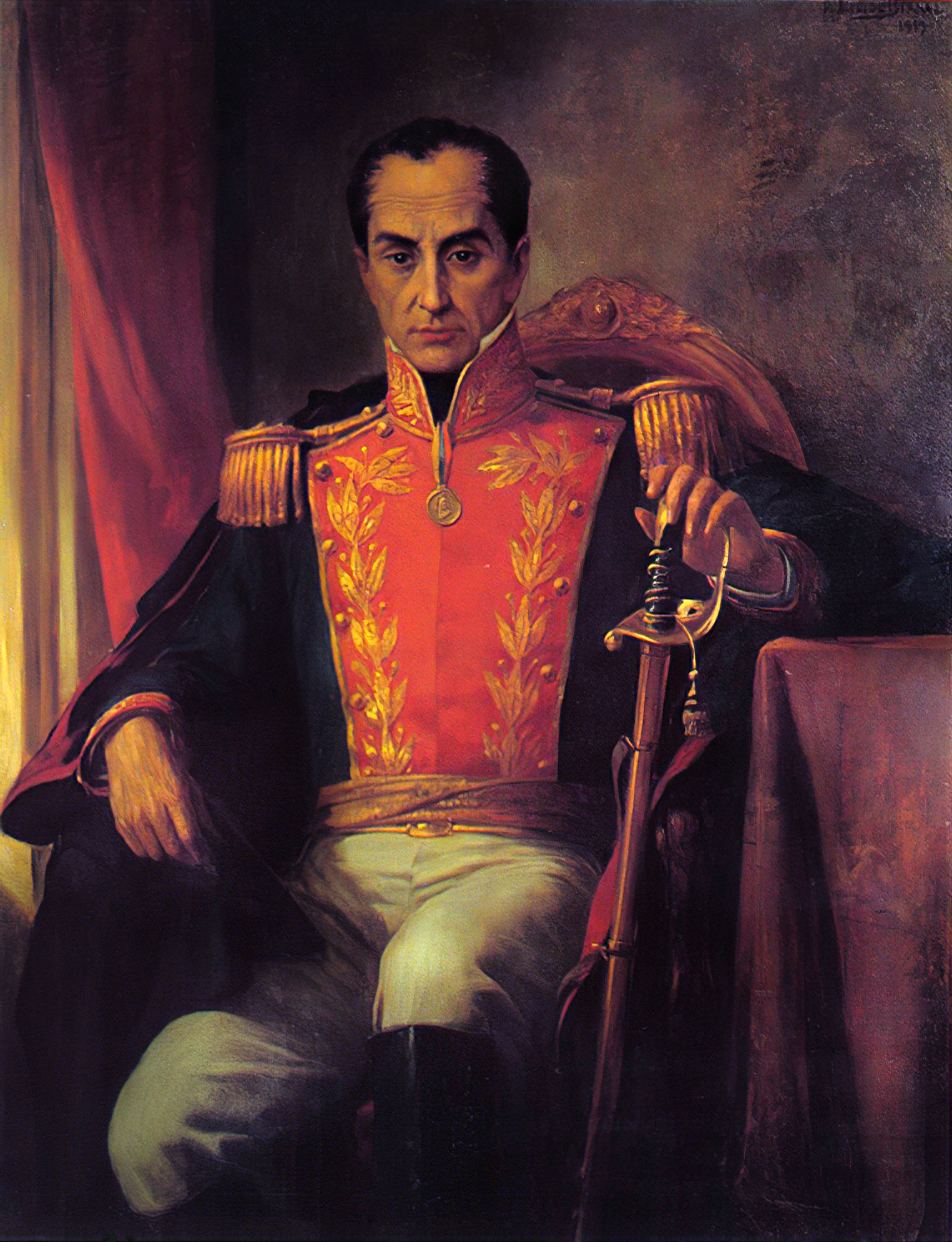
Simon Bolivar by Ricardo Acevedo Bernal

On the other hand, it has been pointed out that Bolívar, before his arrival in Peru, would have been conspiring against the Protectorate of San Martín, through Venezuelan agents such as Tomás de Heres (who participated in an attempted rebellion against Don José de San Martín in October 1821, being deported to Guayaquil and returning to Peru as an important adviser and general of the armies of the Venezuelan liberator), as well as requesting troops from Santander (vice president of Colombia) to generate uprisings and Peruvian protests through spies and infiltrators against San Martin. In this context, it would seem that Bolívar aspired to displace San Martín in the role of consecrating the Independence of South America, and also, to plunge Peru into anarchy that would benefit the interests, both personal of Bolívar to want to stand out as the most important caudillo for guarantee the law and order of the independence process at the continental level, as geopolitical of Gran Colombia, to obtain leadership at the continental level (and thus more easily concretize the future project of the Great Homeland) at the cost of sacrificing the interests of the Peruvians.

"(...) It is necessary to work so that nothing is established in the country (Peru) and the safest way is to divide them all. The measure adopted by Sucre names Torre Tagle, embarking Riva Agüero (...) It is excellent. It is necessary that there is not even a simulation of government and this is achieved by multiplying leaders and putting them in opposition. Upon my arrival, Peru must be a cleared field so that I can do what is convenient in it".

— Letter from Simón Bolívar to Joaquín Mosquera (Bolívar's plenipotentiary minister in Peru).

"Of Peru I know nothing officially, and I hardly have a confused idea of its current situation, which, it seems, is the most regrettable. Its government is so infamous that it has not yet written a word to me; no doubt determined to do some infamy with that miserable town (...) and by going we can take advantage of all its resources"

— Bolívar's letter to Santander of March 12, 1823 (Guayaquil)

In addition, it is mentioned that he spoke in a derogatory way about the Peruvian Army during the Independence of Peru, accusing them, in a very prejudiced way, of being a hindrance to the Venezuelan high command in the United Liberation Army of Peru, and, by nature, more incompetent. that the Colombian soldiers, who deserved to have the credit of the entire campaign over the rest of the nationalities, being very bitter that the Peruvians did not show "gratitude" to the Colombian army and that they were reluctant to maintain traditions of the Spanish ancient regime:

"These Peruvians are not good for soldiers and they flee like deer! (...), Not from you a room for all of Peru, although no one moves at all nor does it seem that these gentlemen are disturbed by the slightest danger. Sometimes I do not understand them their Inca language, I don't know if they are calm or not!"

— Simón Bolívar, December 8, 1824.

"We no longer have to count on the Chileans and Argentines, and these Peruvians are the most miserable men for war. Of course, we must resolve to sustain this fight alone."

— Simon Bolivar, December 21, 1824.

Hiram Paulding, a US sailor who visited him in his camp in Huaraz, recounts that Bolívar told him that the Peruvians "were cowards and that, as a people, they did not have a single manly virtue. In short, his insults were harsh and unreserved... Then they told me that he always used to speak like that about Peruvians." According to Jorge Basadre, Bolívar's anti-Peruvian feelings would explain his triumphalist proclamations with Colombia, where he declared, after the Battle of Ayacucho, that "The loyalty, perseverance and courage of the Colombian army has done everything". Given this, it has been denounced that Bolívar had a very unpleasant treatment with the Peruvian troops under his command, an example is in a case that occurred with Ramon Castilla, who for trying to prevent a Peruvian cavalry corps from being arbitrarily added to a Gran Colombian unit during the Junín campaign, the young Peruvian soldier would suffer a humiliating insult: the Venezuelans (under the command of Bolívar) would have him put in stocks, and even wanted to shoot him, despite being part of the same side and in combat against the royalists. In the process a duel took place between the Cuiraceros of Peru and the Hussars of Colombia that took place on December 26, 1823.

"It is so true that Bolívar has tried to persecute every able-bodied Peruvian without cause, and that when Brigadier General La Fuente was responsible for the last transformation of Trujillo [the Riva-Agüero prison] and that it was titled That Pacifier of the North, [Bolívar] instantly tried to overthrow him. La Fuente made the Peruvian cuirassiers hold on and punish the hussars of Bolívar's guard, who wanted to run over them"

— Manifesto of Torre Tagle of 1824

He was also accused of being very cruel against the troops of the Royal Army of Peru, where the repression was fierce, with executions of those who did not pay tithes, harassment of women, execution of prisoners without trial, slaughter of cattle, desecration of churches, imprisonment of women and children in Huanta and the burning of the towns of Iquicha, Caruahuran and Huayllas (absent violence on the royalist side). The guerrillas had to take refuge in the hills in the Republic of Iquicha. After independence, the royalist Indians of Huanta had to bear the punishment for supporting the monarchists: it was the payment of a tax of 50,000 pesos that the entire homonymous party had to collect (except the towns of Quinua, Guaychán and Acosvinchos), which demanded Marshal Antonio José de Sucre "for having rebelled against the system of Independence and freedom." In said imposition, coca prices were altered and caused an economic crisis.

If the Iquicha Indians rose up against Bolívar's republic, it was neither because they were "deceived" nor because they wanted to perpetuate the most oppressive features of the colonial system. Quite the opposite. They rose up to defend the rights and status that they had received as Indians from the colonial power, and that the criollo republic threatened to liquidate.

— Cecilia Méndez

On the other hand, it has been pointed out that he gave instructions to the army of Greater Colombia, during the Peruvian War of Independence, to carry out looting and other kinds of harassment against the Peruvian population, under the excuse that in times of war it was necessary to act dictatorially, giving extraordinary powers to the militia, and showing indifference to serious cases of corruption, of which Bolívar, instead of executing them, would rather have been in charge of distributing said loot (to avoid conflict between his caudillos) of the Peruvian victims to the looting of their properties. Only in the province of Lambayeque, which was not one of the richest, the amount of 500,000 pesos was extracted in 1824, by quotas and confiscations. In addition to the fact that he came to dismiss Peruvians like Andrés de los Reyes, due to his protests that he gave for Bolívar's orders to loot churches. The discomfort caused by the looting of the Colombians made the indigenous guerrilla Ninavilca exclaim from the four winds that the Colombians were "una chusma de ladrones" [a mob of thieves] who plundered Peruvian resources, and once the conflict ended they did not become more popular, generating an Anti-Colombian (included anti-venezolan) feeling in Peru.

"Not only did Bolívar transfer his dictatorial power to Heres. In each department, in each province of Peru occupied by the Colombians, small dictators exercised their functions, widely empowered to fleece the people (...) Prototype of those little dictators who in 1824 sowed terror in Peru, is that Manterola appointed governor of Huamachuco by Bolívar, who carried out his functions accompanied by his mistress, and at the same time that he looted the unfortunate towns of his jurisdiction and tortured his neighbors."

— Felipe Paz Soldán, Cartas Históricas del Perú [Historical Letters of Peru]

Bolívar was also accused of carrying out a geopolitics with a clear anti-Peruvian direction in Gran Colombia, with absolute opposition to the interests of said political society, both in its form of the Viceroyalty of Peru and of the Republic of Peru, denouncing a mixture of admiration and envy of Peru's economic privileges, as well as suspicion for its population, which he constantly described as contemptuous, even before intervening in its political affairs, since this antipathy would have been clearly distilled since the years of the famous Jamaica Letter.

(…) The Viceroyalty of Peru, whose population amounts to a million and a half inhabitants, is undoubtedly the most submissive and from which the most sacrifices have been made for the king's cause, (…) Chile can be free. Peru, on the contrary, contains two enemy elements of every fair and liberal nature: gold and slaves [referring to the Indians]. The first corrupts everything; the second is corrupted by itself. The soul of a servant [referring to the common people of Peru] rarely manages to appreciate healthy freedom; he rages in riots or humbles himself in chains. (…)

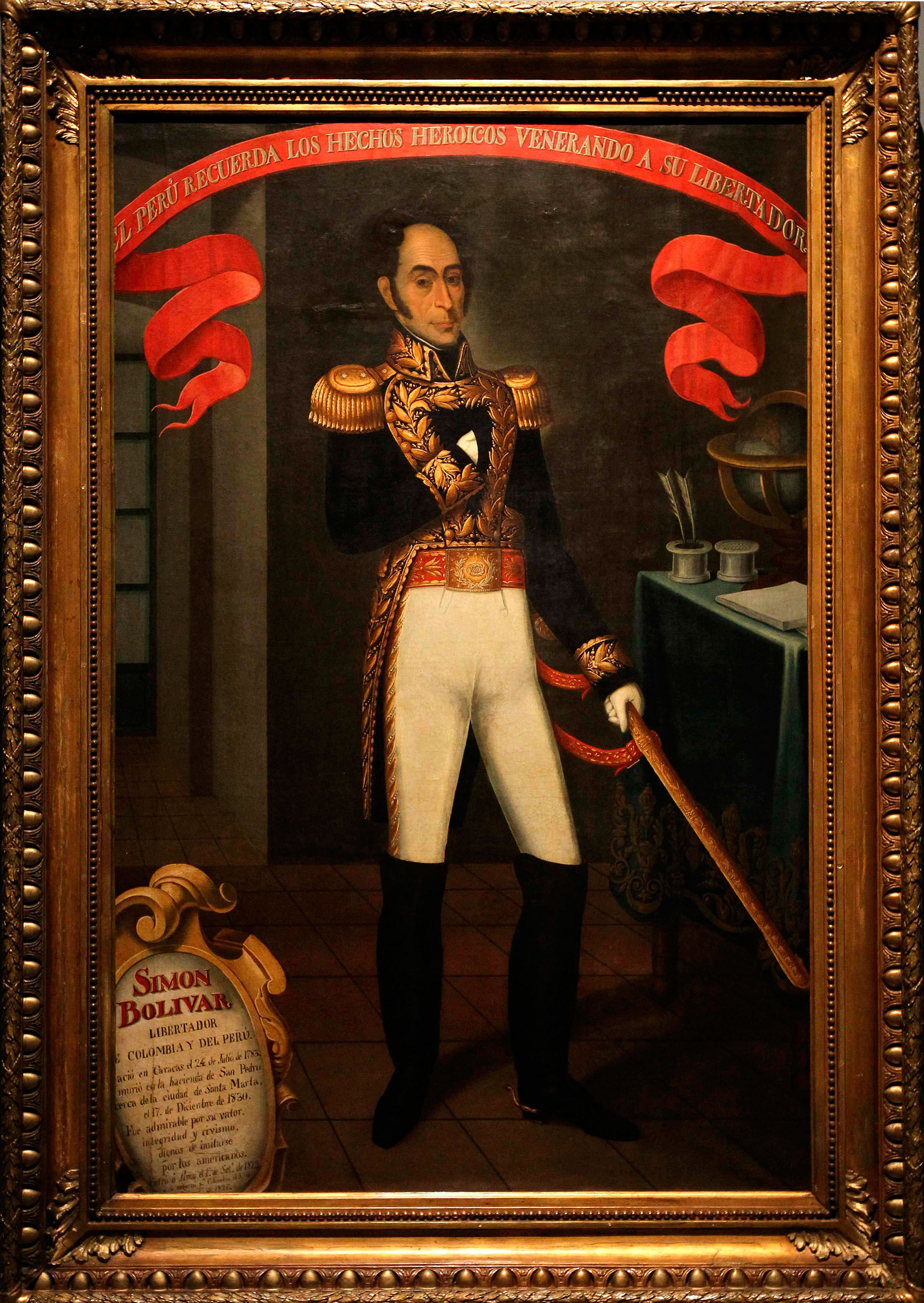
Portrait of Simón Bolívar by the Peruvian painter José Gil de Castro during his dictatorship

John Fisher says, based on a detailed study of the Liberator's correspondence: "To a certain extent his decision to go personally to Peru in August 1823 meant the desire to protect Gran Colombia from the Peruvians." Given this, he would try to wrest territories from him. to the Peruvians in the north, taking advantage of the fact that the independence Peru was still in the process of establishing itself as a sovereign country, despite being aware that provinces such as Maynas or Guayaquil were legally and culturally closer to Peru than to Colombia according to the principle of Uti possidetis iuris that he defended, which would be evidence of total dishonesty on his part to impose the expansionist interests of Gran Colombia against the Peruvians.

"Have you understood that the Corregimiento de Jaén has been occupied by those from Peru; and that Maynas belongs to Peru by a very modern Royal Order [Royal Cedula of 1802]: that it is also occupied by forces from Peru. We will always have to leave Jaén by Maynas and advance if possible our limits of the coast beyond Tumbes."

— Bolívar's letter to Santander of August 3, 1822

After noticing, with disgust, the good image that Peru had (above Colombia and Venezuela) in the towns of Guayaquil, Cuenca and Loja in present-day Ecuador, either because the majority of its inhabitants were Quechua-speaking, or because of the proximity they had with the departments of Piura and Cajamarca, with which they had more trade and exchange than with Viceroyalty of New Granada, which was disconnected from the area by natural barriers in the Andes and the Pacific Ocean (arguments given by the Peruvian Francisco María Roca); harming applying the Free Determination of the peoples in their favor (in fact, the annexation of these territories to Gran Colombia would have been done in authoritarian and illegal ways), which would be aggravated by the centralist and authoritarian policies of the Bolivarian government, whose laws generated discontent in the Southern District. Given this, the mission to weaken Peru was gaining strength in him, until it became an obsession with traits of paranoia and arrogance, which pushed him to declare phrases such as:

"The peoples of southern Colombia have Peru behind them, which tries to seduce them if San Martín wins, as can happen, or the royal army that tries to conquer them by force."

— Simon Bolívar, after the Guayaquil Conference.

"San Martín left for Chile and has left Peru to all the horrors of civil war and anarchy: I would prefer that the Peruvians fall to pieces victorious than that they are subjugated by the Spaniards; because that case would do us less harm than the last."

— Simon Bolívar to Rafael Urdaneta, October 27, 1822.

"The Colombian troops have had the good fortune to stay in Lima: all this pleases me infinitely and you will know more by mail that I expect tomorrow. Meanwhile, I believe that I can safely go to Bogotá, to return later to understand the borders with Peru, which is of great importance, because the province of Maynas given to Peru by the king envelops all of southern Colombia on our backs (...) Peru, with all that it owes us, only thinks of our ruin. The newspapers consume us; San Martín and other of his bosses have been tearing me to pieces for the things of Guayaquil. In short, all this after having been treated with unlimited generosity. What will happen after we enter to dispute interests of all kinds?"

— Simon Bolívar to Santander, October 27, 1822.

"Peruvians are very funny, they have usurped two provinces from us (referring to Jaén and Maynas); four from Buenos Aires (referring to the provinces of Upper Peru) and they dispute Chiloé with Chile, and then they are afraid that they will be conquered, because the thief is always afraid of justice."

— Simon Bolívar to Santander, February 14, 1823. (where he calls the Peruvians "Funny and thieves")

"At this moment I just learned that in the [Colombian] Congress there are good opinions regarding Upper Peru. I call good those who are inclined not to deliver it to Peru, because that is the basis of our public right"

— Simon Bolívar to Sucre, after the Assembly of Upper Peru in 1825

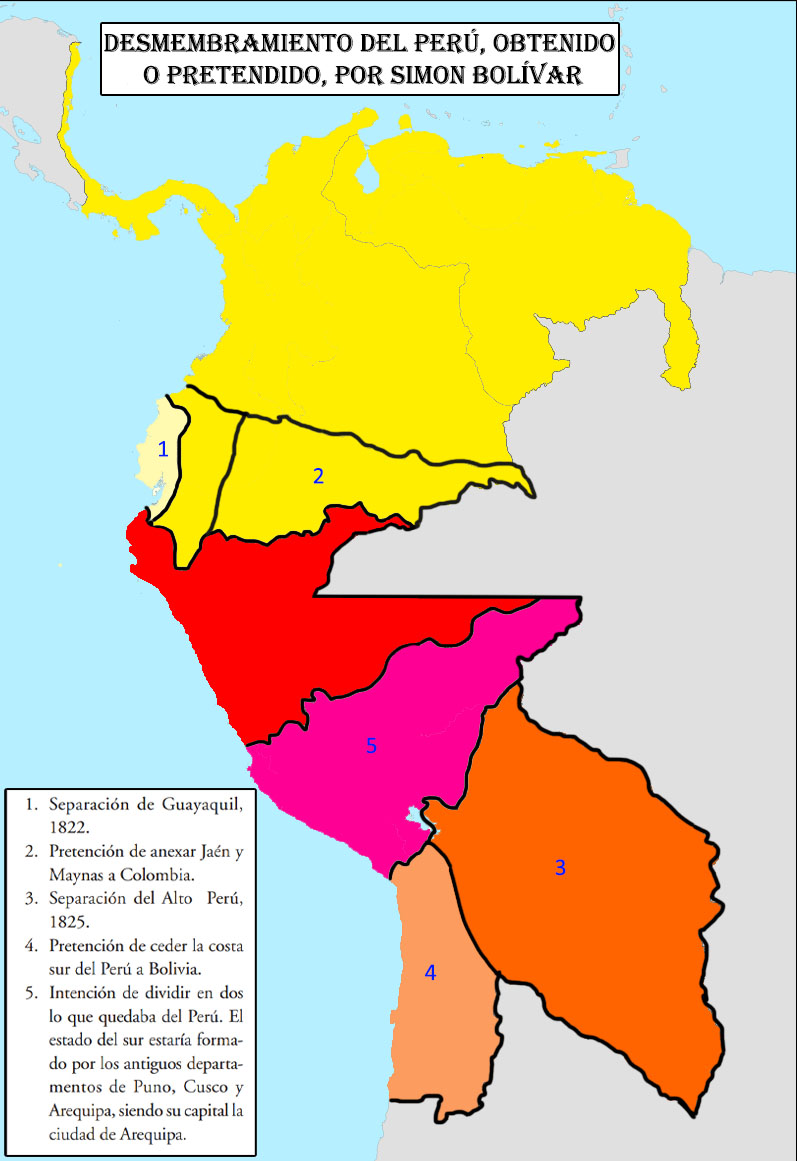
Purported project of Simón Bolívar to territorially dismember Peru and thus facilitate its submission to the project of the Federation of the Andes.

It was even denounced that Bolivar had a final project to provoke a Total Dismemberment of Peru, because the opposition of the Peruvians to his political projects was latent and exaggeratedly feared by Bolívar, therefore, to dominate the Americas, he had a duty to further weaken Peru, being necessary to take away its hegemonic possibility against the neighboring republics in South America, so that he, as president for Life (with the right to name an heir), would rule over all and thus begin the Project of a Hispano-American Confederation (led by Gran Colombia after convoking the Congress of Panama), through the weakening of the Peruvian institutional framework for such purposes. So, he wanted a Federation of the Andes, which would unify Venezuela, Colombia, and Quito (later called Ecuador) with Peru and Bolivia, leaving Bolívar as president for life. But he believed that this Federation could not be done without dividing Peru again, since the other countries ran the risk of being more easily dominated by Peru, being economically weaker at the time. That was how he decided to separate Peru in two again, segregating the southern departments to form another republic. The legal framework that would unite the countries of the Federation would be the "Constitución Vitalicia" [Life Constitution] that Bolívar drafted for Bolivia, and that he would send to the Congress of Peru for its approval and later to that of Greater Colombia. In Lima there was a strong rejection of this alleged way of reunifying both societies in a federation of 3 states (consisting of Bolivia and a Peru divided into north and south), and it was predicted that the country would later be dominated by the leadership of Bogotá with the Bolivar's confederation project. To achieve the separation of southern Peru, Bolívar had the support of the prefects (regional governors) of those departments, especially that of Arequipa, the military and politician Antonio Gutiérrez de la Fuente, laying the foundations for future Arequipa separatism in Peru. Thus, Andres de Santa Cruz sent a letter to La Fuente in which he informed him that, according to reliable anonymous testimony from the Republic of Bolívar, he was aware that Puno, Arequipa and Cuzco sought to make southern Peru independent and thus separate "from the respectable Peruvian nation". However, this final plan was prevented by the fall of the Peruvian Dictatorship of Bolívar in 1827, the Peruvian Intervention in Bolivia in 1828 for the fall of Sucre, and later the Dissolution of Gran Colombia after the Gran Colombian-Peruvian War. Not without Bolívar previously accusing the populations of Peru and Bolivia as "the despicable peoples of the South who allowed themselves to be drawn into the civil war or were seduced by the enemies."

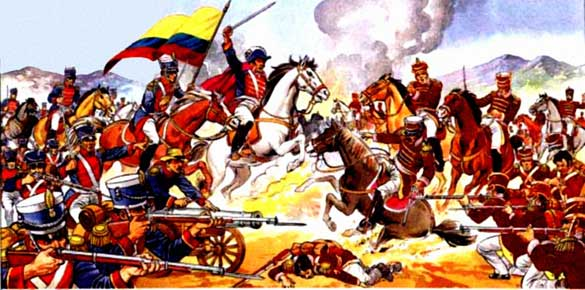
Battle of Portete de Tarqui, a confrontation between the army of Gran Colombia (mostly Venezuelan), against the army of Peru.

Finally, the antecedents of the Gran Colombo-Peruvian War are considered by many historians as the maximum evidence of Bolívar's anti-Peruvianism. It is reported that his acts of government left much to be desired and were even harmful to the Peruvian indigenous population, for which he imprisoned or shot guerrillas who had helped him in the campaigns in the mountains. To the indigenous people, to whom he dedicated his worst insults, he reimposed the indigenous tribute (which had been abolished in the viceroyalty with the constitution of Cádiz) and weakened their peasant communities with the abolition of the Cacicazgos in the young Republic of Peru, breaking thus definitively a hierarchical system of the Inca nobility that had been present, for more than 3 centuries in Peru, for the protection of the economic interests of the Indian against a nascent Gamonalismo. Another measure that made him detested by the indigenous people were the appraisals made in the midst of the war chaos, without control and many times by officials who were members of the Criollo aristocracy or bought by it, which allowed the individual division of their communal lands and their purchase by the landowners, in addition to restoring indigenous tributes, mitas, and pongueajes to help Peruvian finances. Likewise, he restored slavery to blacks, pardos and mulattos (which had been abolished by San Martín) for the benefit of sugar plantations on the coast. Lastly, the old colonial cabildos were abolished. It can also be shown that he would have carried out massive repressions against opponents who had his dictatorship in Peru, such as Juan de Berindoaga y Palomares (who was shot) or Francisco Xavier de Luna Pizarro (who would be deported). Sucre would have commented on several occasions to the Liberator that so many tributes were deceptive, and that many of the Peruvian elite wanted Bolívar's failure to run to negotiate with the royalists. The Bolivarian regime quickly earned the animosity of Peruvians: Bolívar created a Supreme Court that imprisoned or exiled various political opponents, and shot patriotic soldiers or guerrillas who publicly disagreed. The exercise of freedom of the press was prevented and the right to elect their municipal authorities was withdrawn from the councils (May 26, 1826). Over time the Colombian army was seen as the Praetorian Guards of its puppet governments. In addition, a very thorny issue was that of "replacements", a compensation that Peru would make to Colombian troops for the casualties suffered by them during the war, by exchanging Peruvian citizens and expatriating them to Gran Colombia, exorbitant and inhuman requirement, given that the war had already ended. Given this, Bolívar demobilized most of the Peruvian units (about five thousand who replaced the Gran Colombian casualties) and after the capitulation of Callao, presented on February 10, 1826, the demand to send 6,000 Peruvian recruits to serve Venezuela, sending the first contingents in July, probably no more than 3,000, officially to reinforce the defenses against a possible French invasion (Cien Mil Hijos de San Luis) but in reality it was to confront General Páez, who had started La Cosiata (a separatist movement in Venezuela) and also to demilitarize Peru so that it is not a future threat to its continental projects in the Patria Grande. The troops sent there, due to the distance and lack of knowledge of the language (the majority were indigenous who barely knew Spanish) made desertion or mutiny difficult, many of those sent dying due to the weather and tropical diseases. It is known that some survivors were repatriated of New Granada and Venezuela in 1852 and 1857 respectively. Due to the lifelong and authoritarian constitutions promulgated for Peru and Bolivia, the Liberator would be accused of using his armies to impose political systems, in a republican imperialism, rather than making countries independent. Even the Chilean and Río de la Plata governments mistrusted Bolívar, accusing him of not letting each people decide their future. Bolívar's attitude contributed to accentuate this negative climate. He was irritable and reacted violently to the slightest contradiction. His egomania, already great, increased in those days to unimaginable levels when he had territories from the Venezuelan Caribbean to the Bolivian altiplano under his control. According to a diplomatic source from the United States, in 1826, during the celebration of his birthday, Bolívar stated at a banquet in his honor that he was "the greatest man of all those recorded in history, and that not only the heroes of antiquity were inferior to him in liberal ideas, but also Washington and Napoleon had lagged behind." He also used to do various eccentricities, such as suddenly stopping on the table and kicking bottles and glasses, as if to indicate that he could do whatever he wanted in Peru. In addition, in 1828, when the Peruvians entered Bolivia and After Sucre was deposed, Bolívar sought to create a "Bogotá-Rio de Janeiro axis" abandoning his previous attempts to isolate the Brazilian monarchy to achieve an anti-Peruvian coalition. It was a failure due to Colombian political instability and the geographical distances between its centers of power. Even after being expelled from the government of Peru and the Gran Colombo-Peruvian war ended, he would continue to rant against Peru and its people in multiple letters, considering them the greatest disgrace on the American continent and with a people complicit in tyranny, seeing the country as epitome of all the anarchic defects that plagued Latin America after the independences:

"What men, or what demons, are these! From one end to the other, the New World seems an abyss of abomination; and if anything were lacking to complete this frightful chaos, Peru, with too much, would be enough to fill it. Accomplice of their tyrants during the War of Independence, without yet achieving its freedom, Peru anticipates tearing up its own bosom in the first days of its existence.The gallant General San Martín, at the head of the Chileans and the Argentineans, expels to the Spaniards from Trujillo to Ica. For Lima, there was no Peru but freedom, and at once some were bent on getting rid of San Martín, whose services they most urgently needed. This act of ingratitude breaks Peru's political career and follows the I galloped to Girón, where the most execrable work was consummated..."

— Simon Bolívar, Organic Decree issued on August 27, 1828 in Bogotá

It is also known that, during the monarchical attempt in Gran Colombia, Bolívar saw as envious and delusional countries the new American States that did not accept the leadership of others (for example, France and the United Kingdom), such as Peru and the Dominican Republic, in so much so that Bolívar believed that the new independent states should accept the protection and submission to a world Power to protect themselves from internal anarchy and international isolation. Peru in these letters is considered as "the flame of discord" in the South American Continent.

"What you are pleased to tell me regarding the new project of naming a successor to my authority who is a European prince, does not catch me again, because something had been communicated to me with not a little mystery and a bit of timidity, since you know my way of acting. think.

I don't know what to say to you about this Idea, which contains a thousand inconveniences. You must know that, for my part, there would be none, determined as I am to leave the command in this next Congress, but who can mitigate the ambition of our leaders and the fear of inequality among the lowly people? Don't you think that England would be jealous of the choice made in a Bourbon? How much would not be opposed by all the new American states, and the United States that seem destined by Providence to plague America with miseries in the name of Liberty? It seems to me that I already see a general conspiracy against this poor Colombia, already too envied by all the Republics America has. All the presses would be in motion calling for a new crusade against the accomplices of treason against freedom, addicts of the Bourbons and violators of the American system. In the South, the Peruvians would ignite the flame of discord; by the Isthmus those of Guatemala and Mexico, and by the Antilles the Americans and the liberals of all parts. Santo Domingo would not stay idle and call his brothers to make common cause against a prince of France. They would all become enemies without Europe doing anything to support us, because the New World is not worth the expense of a Holy Alliance; At least, we have reason to judge so, due to the indifference with which we have been seen to undertake and fight for the emancipation of half the world, which very soon will be the most productive source of European prosperity.

In short, I am very far from being opposed to the reorganization of Colombia according to the experienced institutions of wise Europe. On the contrary, I would be infinitely happy and revive my strength to help in a work that can be called salvation and that can be achieved not without difficulty supported by us from England and France. With these powerful aids we would be capable of everything, without them, no. For the same reason, I reserve myself to give my definitive opinion when we know what the governments of England and France think about the aforementioned change of system and choice of dynasty."

— Bolivar's letter to Patricio Campbell, Guayaquil, August 5, 1829

Some historians, such as Rubén Vargas Ugarte, affirm that the lack of good faith in his actions and his lack of appreciation for Peruvian chiefs and officials (which make him less than ideal from a moral point of view), together with the set of Bolívar's anti-Peruvian insults, would be the product of his "nervous breakdowns".

- Antonio José de Sucre, during his actions in the Secession of Upper Peru (where the independence of Upper Peru was not foreseeable by "judgment persons", if not by a regionalist oligarchy) or in the Gran Colombo-Peruvian War (of which accuses him of being excessively triumphalist and generating dishonours), in addition to proposing the fragmentation of Peru into a Republic of the north and south while ceding Arica to the Republic of Bolívar. He was also accused of having returned to the Ayacucho Capitulation an agreement with humiliating conditions for Peruvians, which would not feel like a victory.
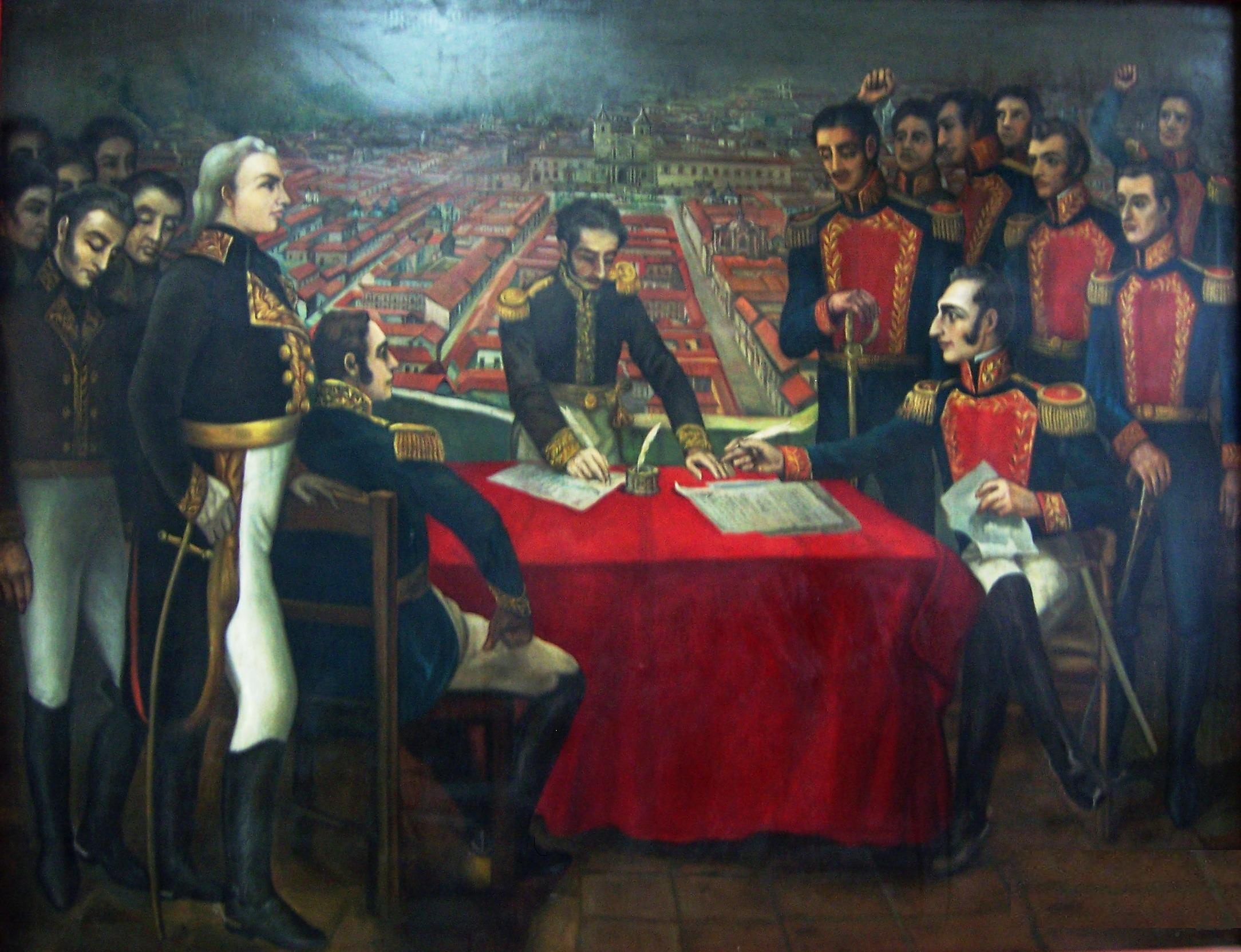
  The Capitulation of Ayacucho. Many historians consider that its detrimental conditions to the economic interests of the nascent independent Peru are evidence of the anti-Peruvianism of Bolívar and Sucre.
  "Doctor Olañeta has told me that he believes it is not only difficult but impossible to reunite the high provinces to Buenos Aires: that there is an irreconcilable enmity: that they remain independent or attached to Peru; because the vote of men of judgment is about to belong to the Peru, in which case they want the capital in Cuzco, or closer to them. May this news serve as the government, which is corroborated by many others, so that you can tell me based on these data what to do or proceed in these businesses. My position can give me the case of giving some march to the opinion of those towns and you will tell me what is best for the public cause."
  — Antonio José de Sucre, February 5, 1825.
  The considerations of Sucre's decree would be contradictory and weak to camouflage anti-Peruvian sentiment. On the one hand, he would say that "it is not up to the liberation army to intervene in the businesses of these towns," and yet he convened a political assembly under the auspices of the President of Colombia (Bolívar). He would also say that Argentina, heir to the viceregal rights over Upper Peru, "lacks a General Government" and that "there is therefore no one to deal with", but he does not mention that Peru also had rights, as well as that its government was established and running. But the most absurd of all, and also the most important, is that in his last recital, Sucre says that he convenes the assembly, because he has that right as "the majority of the liberation army is made up of Colombians." This would indicate the total lack of respect that Sucre had, both for the Peruvian government and for Peruvians. In addition, Sucre would have no authority to call an assembly (neither by Bolívar nor by the Congress of Peru), and yet he called it. Later Simón Bolívar would annul the right to veto that he had granted to the Peruvian congress to endorse the acts of the assembly of 1825. It should also be added that, in the Independence of Upper Peru, the indigenous masses did not participate, only the upper strata of the population, that is, Criollos of the elite. However, due to his control of the army and the congresses of Lima and Chuquisaca, Sucre and especially Bolívar held the last word on the destiny of Upper Peru. Limeños were annoyed that according to the principle of Uti possidetis iuris, the viceroyalty of New Granada had become independent intact, while theirs had not. Later he would come to offer the territories of the then southern coast of Peru (Tacna, Arica and Tarapaca) to Bolivia, but these procedures would be prevented by the fall of the Bolívar and Sucre dictatorship in Peru and Bolivia. Furthermore, in a letter to the Peruvian Foreign Ministry, Ortiz de Zevallos revealed Sucre's decisive opposition to Bolívar's Federation project until Peru was divided into two States. Sucre wanted to delay any union of Bolivia with Peru as long as possible (knowing that it would fall under the latter's hegemony when it passed, weakening his government), annex all the territories offered by Ortiz, confront Colombia with Peru, secure his back by agreeing with Chile and Buenos Aires, and separate Arequipa, Cuzco and Puno from Peru. All this is demonstrated when Sucre indicated to Ortiz de Zevallos that: "only under that plan could Bolivia not fear that Peru would absorb it, as happens when a small State links up with a larger and stronger one". As well as when in 1827, Sucre appointed dean Gregorio Funes, a Bolivarian Argentine, who was carrying out the functions of Colombian minister in Buenos Aires, to receive the post of Bolivian minister in the same Argentine capital. Through Funes, Sucre addressed the issue of an alliance between Bolivia, Argentina and Chile, which was supposedly to stop Brazilian expansionism, but in practice he was looking for support against Peru because he knew its weakness against it, and suggested that the participation of Gran Colombia in the war against Brazil could occur through a treaty. From Santiago de Chile, Andrés Santa Cruz interpreted Sucre's opening to Buenos Aires as an attempt to form "an anti-popular and very particularly anti-Peruvian pact." The negotiations did not prosper because the Peruvians also sent agents who assured that Bolívar intended to divide the continent between two great empires: one Colombian and the other Brazilian. In practice, Sucre depended so much on the orders of Bolívar that he was quickly seen by Peruvians and people of the River Plate as a puppet or bridgehead of the Liberator in the continental south, a “proconsul of the Bolivian empire”.

"You can't think of the multitude of papers that come from Peru to upset Bolivia. Until today they have had no influence, but perhaps in the long run they will do something. the Argentines. I am happy about this because I will be able to carry out the project of the federation of Chile, Bolivia and Buenos Aires."

— Letter from Sucre to Bolívar, Potosí, June 4, 1827.

Subsequently, Sucre would have carried out an intense campaign to seize Arica from Peru and give it to Bolivia for its annexation to a natural outlet to the sea, proposing it in October 1826, he also warned Bolívar, during one of his letters of the year 1828, about the danger that Peru would be for Gran Colombia:

"If Peru conquers Bolivia and keeps it, the South of Colombia (current Ecuador) runs a thousand and a thousand risks."

— Letter from Sucre to Bolívar, 1828

To this is added the testimony of the Argentine minister M. Bustos, who on October 27, 1828, said in the Buenos Aires newspaper "El Tiempo" that Sucre and Gamarra had put together a plan to make Bolívar the Emperor of South America, separating Puno, Arequipa and Cuzco from the Republic of Peru, something Bolívar was aware of but did not want to make a false step. The centralism of the capital only produced new supporters of federalism and, in some cases, of secession, in Arequipa. The prefect of Puno, Benito Laso de la Vega, tried to convince his colleagues in Lampa, Agustín Gamarra from Cuzco and Antonio Gutiérrez de la Fuente from Arequipa, of a project of "microfederalism" or "provincial federation" to separate the south and force the whole country to join the Andean federation of Bolívar. Santa Cruz did everything he could to prevent greater autonomy in the regions and persecute any separatist movement. He removed Laso from his duties and warned the other two. Later, during the Gran Colombian-Peruvian War, Sucre's anti-Peruvian attitudes were denounced, who, to commemorate the triumph of the Gran Columbian army over the Peruvian advance, ordered the construction of a commemorative obelisk on the site where the battle occurred, with an inscription increasing the number of Peruvian soldiers that took part in action and decreasing their own, in the following terms:

"The Peruvian army of 8,000 soldiers that invaded the land of their liberators, was defeated by 4,000 braves from Colombia on February 27, 1829."

José de la Mar protested the words on the monument, which he considered triumphalist and erroneous. In addition, he complained about the treatment received by the Peruvian dead and prisoners after the battle, with emphasis on the decapitation of the corpse of Pedro Raulet, one of the officers who fell in Tarqui, whose head was nailed to a pike and paraded through the streets of Cuenca. He maintained that only the vanguard made up of about a thousand men had been destroyed in Tarqui, after having vigorously resisted the entire Gran Colombian army; and he added that his attack on the most immediate plain was awaited in vain after the charge of the Cedeño squadron had been repulsed by the Husares de Junín. He emphasized that the entire Peruvian army had not gathered more than 4,500 men and that by mentioning their number raising it to 8,000, Sucre had made a willful mistake for anti-Peruvian reasons. For all these reasons, he declared the Girón Agreement suspended: "while [...] satisfaction capable of indemnifying the injuries received is given, and the depressive documents are destroyed, the existence of which would drive away even the hope of reconciliation." For this reason, he proceeded to denounce the Girón Agreement, once again preparing to undertake hostilities.

== See also ==
- Anti-Chilean sentiment
- Chile–Peru relations
- Chilenization of Tacna, Arica, and Tarapacá
- Colombianization of Leticia, Putumayo and Caquetá
- Ecuadorian–Peruvian territorial dispute
- Indigenous peoples and the War of the Pacific
