= Expulsion of Chileans from Bolivia and Peru in 1879 =

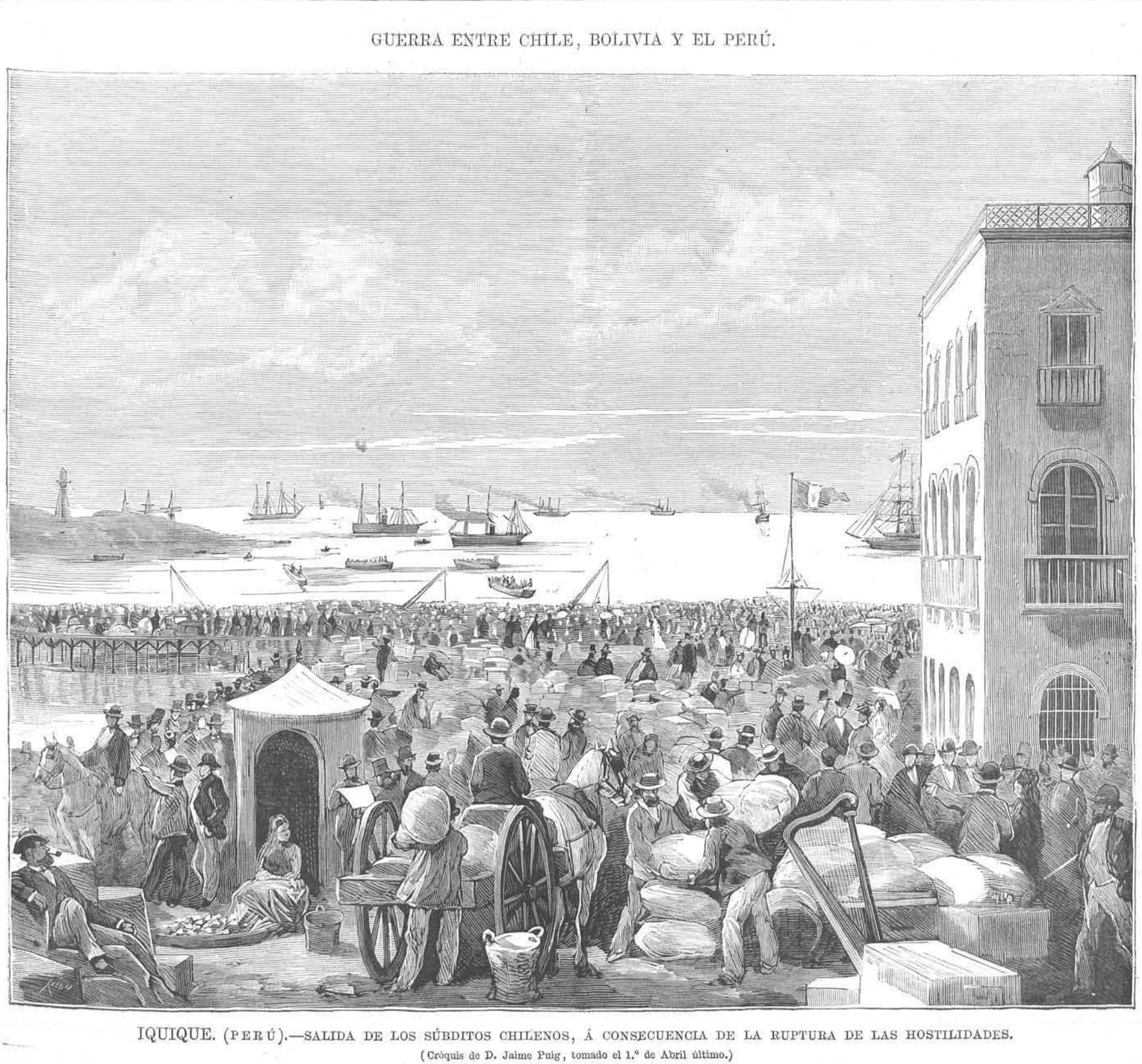
The Spanish magazine La Ilustración Española y Americana published on 15 June 1879 an image (of April 1879) of Chileans waiting at the port of Iquique for ships to return home.

The Expulsion of Chileans from Bolivia and Peru in 1879 was an ethnic cleansing ordered by of the governments of Bolivia (on 1 March 1879) and Peru (on 15 April 1879). The expulsion took place at the beginning of the War of the Pacific (1879–1883) between Chile and Peruvian-Bolivian alliance. Chilean citizens (about 30,000 to 40,000 in number) in both nations were ordered to leave within eight days or face internment and confiscation of their property. They were expelled on poorly built rafts and pontoons at Peruvian ports, or forced to wander through the desert to reach the northernmost positions occupied by the Chilean Army in Antofagasta. The edict was widely popular in Peru and met with little resistance, allowing it to occur quickly.

== Chilean workers in Peru and Bolivia ==
In Peru and Bolivia, migrant Chilean workers were employed in industries that the local inhabitants were unable or unwilling to perform in such as railroad construction, the nitrate industry, and the docks. Chile also had investments in both countries.

Chileans were often key organizers of labour but also "nationalist" quarrels and riots.

Regarding how the Chilean workers were viewed in the new countries, Chilean historian Julio Pinto asserts that, "they were, to a certain extent, accustomed to an industrial work discipline and that their permanent rebellion against authorities and bosses were only a visible refusal to the capitalist driven disintegration of the traditional Chilean society. Among Chilean migrants, there was a kind of connection...because of their condition as foreigners in Peru and Bolivia, despite the only common ground being that they were all from Chile."

Vallejos also stated that, "due to their growing population, their violent conduct, and their exacerbated national identity, Chilean migrants became an unsolved issue for the maintenance of peace, public order and security in Tarapaca as well as Antofagasta." This resulted in the widespread government surveillance of Chileans in both Bolivia and Peru.

Benjamín Vicuña Mackenna wrote about a Chilean organization known as La Patria whose sole objective was to separate the Antofagasta region from Bolivia.

=== Peru ===
Chilean workers were present in Peru throughout the second half of the 19th century, especially in the Tarapacá Province and Central Peru. It is not known how many Chileans were living in Peru in 1879 but according to the 1876 Peruvian census, Chileans made up around 26% of the population in Tarapacá Province. In Iquique, the main port of the region, 52% of the population was Chilean. Between 1868 and 1872 there were 20,000 to 25,000 Chileans who came to work on construction of the railroads, recruited by Henry Meiggs.

In December 1876, Chile and Peru negotiated a treaty of friendship, commerce and navigation, but it was not ratified by either nation. Among other things, it would have protected the rights of migrants in both countries.

=== Bolivia ===
In Bolivian Antofagasta, the 1878 census showed that 77% of the inhabitants were Chilean.

Chilean companies also exploited the mineral resources in Huanchaca (silver mine), Corocoro (cooper mine), Oruro (silver mine), and the prosperous silver town of Caracoles. In all, there were 49 companies registered in Santiago or Valparaiso, with a nominal capital of 16,000,000 Chilean pesos. The main producer of nitrate in Antofagasta was the Chilean Compañía de Salitres y Ferrocarriles de Antofagasta (CSFA), which had Antony Gibbs & Sons of London as one of its minority shareholders. The CSFA had a nominal capital of 2,000,000 Chilean pesos.

== Background ==
Refugees during the War of the Pacific

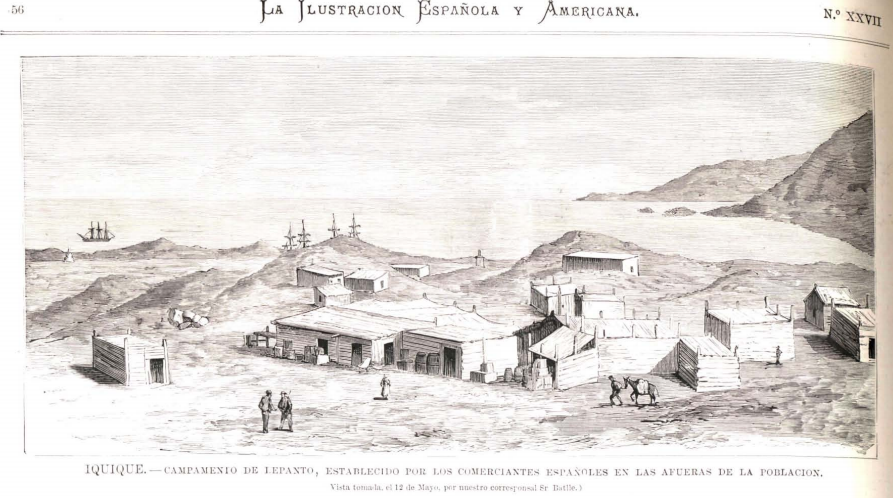
Spanish merchants at a makeshift storage location outside Iquique (22 July 1879)

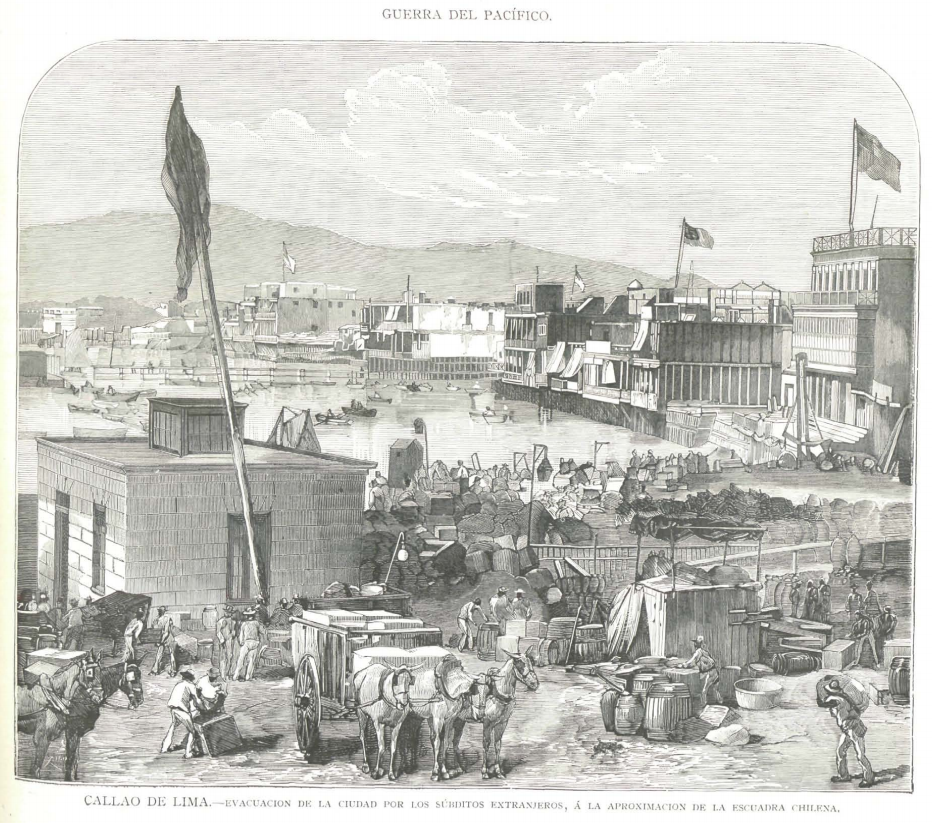
Evacuation of Callao (30 January 1881). US flags raised to mark neutral soil.

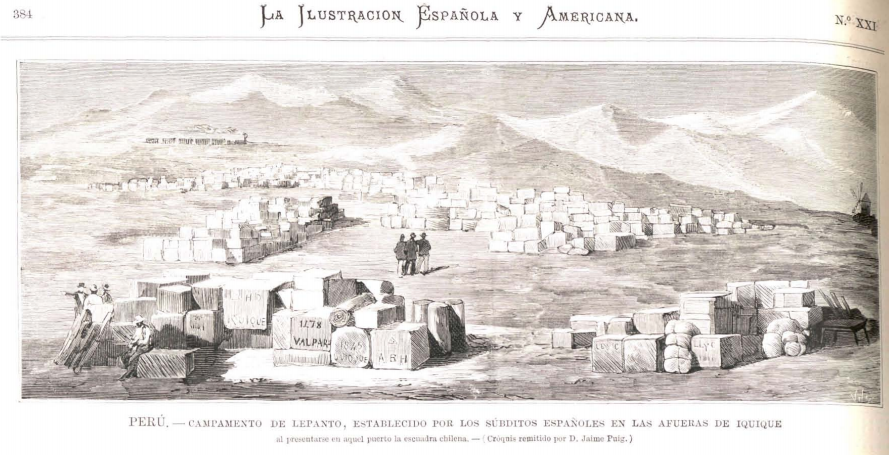
Spanish refugees in Iquique (8 June 1879)

Neither Peruvians (ca. 400 persons) nor Bolivians residents in Chile were molested or had to leave the country.

When Chilean forces occupied the region of Antofagasta in February 1879, the Bolivian garrisons marched to Cobija and Calama, and the deposed authorities embarked on the ship Amazonas bound for the North.

After the Chilean declaration of war (5 April), the Chilean Navy sought to stop the Peruvian export of nitrate and guano by shelling the export ports. Due to disruption of guano and saltpeter trade, as well as the naval blockade, people from towns that were only connected to Central Peru by sea (Iquique, Huanillos, Pabellon de Pica, Pisagua) began to leave the region. In November 1879, after the capitulation of Iquique, 1,300 Peruvians embarked on an Ilo bound voyage to Arica and Callao.

The consulate of Peru in La Paz was informed in July 1880 that 600 Peruvians that had escaped the Chilean conquest of Tacna and Arica were living as refugees in the capital of Bolivia.

As the war reached Central Peru, many cities, towns and villages suffered the horrors of war. In January 1881, the Chileans overran the defenses of Lima, capital of Peru, and people sought protection in European and US consulates, as well as their warships;

In 1878, the Bolivian Government imposed a new tax on nitrate exports, affecting the CSFA, in contradiction of Article IV of the Boundary Treaty of 1874 between Chile and Bolivia which prohibited any new tax on Chilean businesses and investments in Antofagasta. The company refused to pay the tax, and in February 1879 the Bolivian Government cancelled their mining licenses, nationalized the CSFA and announced its auction. Peru, allied with Bolivia due to a secret treaty of alliance signed in 1873, had tried to build a saltpeter monopoly and was set to benefit greatly from the breakup of the CSFA, its main competitor.

On 14 February 1879, the port of Antofagasta, and later the whole province, was seized by Chilean troops. On 1 March 1879, Bolivia declared war with Chile. On 5 April 1879, Chile declared war on Peru, leading to Bolivia and Peru declared a casus foederis the following day.

== Eviction decrees ==
On 1 March 1879, Hilarion Daza, dictator of Bolivia, announced that Bolivia was in a state of war and ordered the cessation of all commerce with Chile, as well as the eviction of all Chilean citizens from Bolivian territory within 8 days; they were permitted to take only hand luggage and their personal papers. The rest of their property was seized by the state. Chilean-owned businesses continued to function under state supervision, but the profits were confiscated. This applied to all Chilean-owned businesses (despite whether the owners lived in Bolivia). Moreover, any transfer of Chilean property after 8 November 1878 was nullified.

In Peru, the eviction was decreed on 15 April 1879 by the Government of Mariano Ignacio Prado "to secure the success of the military operations"; within 8 days all Chileans had to leave Peru, except Chilean owners of real estate and those who had a Peruvian wife. Disobeying the decree would result in the internment of the wrongdoer(s). Two days later, the property and marital exceptions were suspended "in reprisal for the Chilean bombardment of defenseless Peruvian ports", and all Chilean citizens had to leave Peru within 8 days.

On 17 April 1879, the Peruvian newspaper El Peruano justified the measure, which was considered tough but necessary, for counterespionage reasons as well as retaliation against the insolent and provocative attitude of Chileans in Peru, the aggression against Peruvians citizens in Chile, and the Chilean bombardment of defenseless ports. It alluded to the expulsion of German citizens from France during the Franco-Prussian War which conformed to international law, according to Bluntschli.

== Direct consequences ==
In Peru, a humanitarian crisis unfolded, as thousands of men, women and children tried to reach the coast and get a ticket in one of the ships bound for Chile in order to return home. Those who could not leave the country were imprisoned, and in some cases condemned to forced labor.

Chilean historian Diego Barros Arana wrote:

Due to the decree, Chileans who could not embark because of want of money or illness in Lima and Callao were imprisoned if they did not meet the Peruvian deadline. In Southern Peru, especially in the coastal regions where the Peruvian army was concentrated, local authorities arbitrarily shortened the time limit. The prefect of Arequipa, who ordered the eviction of Chileans two days before the national decree, gave Chileans only 24 hours to leave Peru. In Tarapaca, Chileans got two or three hours. In Iquique, Chileans could not have embarked without the protection of British and US sailors; and in Huanillos, they had to travel on foot through the desert, until they reached the Loa River, where they were helped by the Chilean soldiers stationed in the region.	(Orig. Spanish) En cumplimiento de la parte penal de esos decretos, en Lima i el Callao fueron reducidos a prisión los chilenos que por falta de recursos o por enfermedad, no pudieron embarcarse; pero se respetó el plazo accordado para salir del territorio. Pero, en los departamentos del sur del Perú, i especialmente en las poblaciones del litoral, donde se estaba reuniendo el ejército peruano, las autoridades locales acortaron a su antojo este plazo. Asi, el prefecto de Arequipa, que resolvió por si solo la espulsion de los chilenos dos días antes del primer decreto del gobierno supremo, les concedió solo 48 horas para salir al estranjero. En la provincia de Tarapacá se les concedieron dos o tres horas. En Iquique no habrian podido embarcarse sin la protección de los marinos ingleses i norteamericanos; i en Huanillos tuvieron que emprender su viaje a pié, por los arenales del desierto, hasta llegar a las orillas del Loa, donde fueron socorridos por las tropas chilenas que ocupaban estos lugares.
Diego Barros Arana, Historia de la Guerra del Pacífico (1879-1880), page 79

Sergio Villalobos asserts that the first group that was expelled from Huanillos was made up of 400 Chileans and the journey took three days. Other groups came from Huanillos to Tocopilla and Iquique. They were concentrated in the customs zone of the port, and the Peruvian authorities used them as a human shield against the Chilean shelling of the port. On 5 April 1879, hundreds of refugees from Lima embarked on the Rimac and began to threaten General Juan Buendia, Chief of the Peruvian Army of Iquique. The captain of the ship, without the means to confront the refugees, had to disembark in the closest port.

In Pabellon de Pica, one of the guano extraction fields in Tarapaca, a Chilean Navy raid against the port on 15 April 1879 found 350 refugees on a pontoon, property of a British citizen who had allowed them to stay there because they were unable to walk to Tocopilla. The next day, the raid was continued in Huanillos, where they found 100 Chileans enclosed in a pontoon. In both places, the guano loading equipment was destroyed and the refugees brought to Iquique (under blockade) to board ships heading for Antofagasta.

Carlos Donoso Rojas asserts that the head of Chilean Consulate in Iquique, Antonio Solari Millas, had to face the difficult task of moving thousand of Chilean citizens to ships after the Peruvian Government issued a decree that punished with fines those who protected or hid Chilean refugees on 29 May 1879. Even before their arrival in Antofagasta, the expelled workers had been contacted by the Chilean Army through the consul to serve in the Expeditionary Corps.

More than 1,000 Chileans remained imprisoned in Lima and Callao until the occupation of the capital of Peru by the Chilean forces in January 1881. Others became forced laborers in the coal mines of Junin, and at the end of 1879 and early 1880, there were still reports of persecution and suffering endured by those who were unable to leave Peru; on 19 November 1879, Spencer St John, British Plenipotentiary Minister in Peru, supported the claims of Henry Pender, a British subject who was beaten and robbed by the soldiers in Callao during riots against Chilean women married to foreign citizens. Pender had been mistaken for a Chilean.

=== Military consequences ===
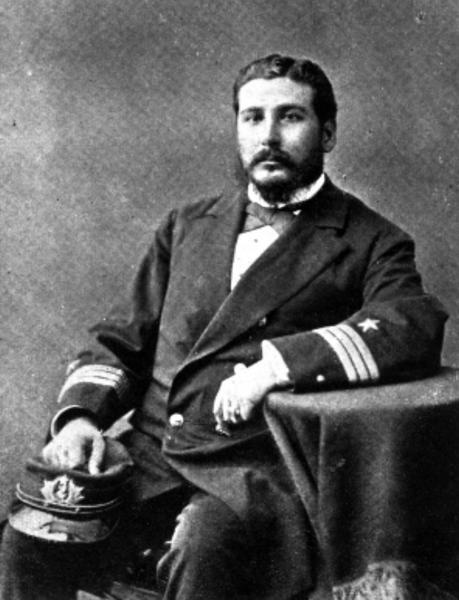
Juan José Latorre was son of a Peruvian businessman resident in Chile. He was commander of the ironclad Cochrane, the strongest unit of the Chilean fleet and he participated in the shelling of Callao, where his brother, Elías Latorre, defended the forts of the harbor.

According to Valentina Verbal Stockmeyer, the first troops of the Expeditionary Army of Chile came from the professional army originally fighting the Mapuche in Araucanía. The second wave of soldiers came from the Chilean inhabitants of Antofagasta which praised the Chilean occupation of the territory in February 1879. The next draft came from workers returning from Peru after their eviction. Chilean historian Francisco Antonio Encina estimated that about 7,000 repatriated people were enlisted in the Chilean Expeditionary Army.

Historians point out the Chilean soldiers' resentment towards their expulsion led to unlawful behavior during the war. Regarding the looting and burning of Mollendo, Gonzalo Bulnes wrote:

Indiscipline was perceived after the [Chilean] division disembarked, especially the 3rd Regiment which was built up by repatriates from Peru who were forced to leave with their men and their families at the beginning of the war, waiting for a steamer to come home. They were the relicts [reminiscences] from an exodus of working people scattered in the guano and saltpeter labour, evicted in a short time by Prado's Government, without food and with the loss of their scarce furniture and household. The resentment of that unit and their determination to make [Peruvians] pay a high price [for the expulsion] was known to the Chilean Army.	(Orig. Spanish) Sintomas de indisciplina se notaron desde que la division bajó a tierra especialmente en el rejimiento N° 3 formado con repatriados del Perú, con los espulsados del país, echados casi an empujones a los botes, ellos i sus familias, al principio de la guerra, en espera de un vapor que los condujese a Chile. Eran las reliquias del éxodo de un pueblo de trabajadores repartido en las faenas del guano i del salitre, lanzados en plazo perentorio por el Gobierno de Prado, sin víveres, perdiendo sus escasos muebles i utensilios domésticos. Era conocido en el ejército el encono de esa tropa, i su resolucion de hacer pagar caros los ultrajes.
Gonzalo Bulnes, De Antofagasta a Tarapacá, page 148

The Peruvian Navy dismissed Chileans who were serving in the warships before the eviction decree.

== Aftermath ==
During the failed Peace Conference of Arica in 1880 and the negotiations of the Treaty of Ancon, one of the Chilean demands was the immediate return of confiscated property back to the expelled Chileans. Tribunales arbitrales (courts of arbitration) were established between Chile and Peru in order to determine the amount of reparations that was needed to be paid for the confiscated property. (see Chilean law 1014, Establecimiento de Tribunal Arbitral Chileno-Peruano en 1897).

Sergio Villalobos wrote about the expulsion:

The decree issued by the Government in Lima was justifiable in wartime. But not the cruelty used to enforce it, which provoked the anger of the affected and all Chileans.	(Orig. Spanish) Las disposiciones dictadas por el gobierno limeño eran comprensibles en tiempo de guerra, aunque no la dureza para su cumplimiento, que tenía que provocar la indignación de los afectados y de todos los chilenos en general.
Sergio Villalobos R., Chile y Perú, La historia que nos une y nos separa, 1535-1883, page 162

== See also ==
- Chilenization of Tacna, Arica and Tarapaca, systematic discrimination and harassment against Peruvian citizens after the war in order to complete the annexation of the ceded territory of Tarapaca and to obtain the annexation of Tacna and Arica.

== Bibliography ==
- Basadre, Jorge (1964). Historia de la Republica del Peru, La guerra con Chile (in Spanish). Lima, Peru: Peruamerica S.A. Archived from the original on December 11, 2007.
- Bulnes, Gonzalo (1920). Chile and Peru: the causes of the war of 1879 (in Spanish). Santiago, Chile: Imprenta Universitaria.
- Donoso Rojas, Carlos (2004). "El comienzo del bloqueo de Iquique y la situación de los chilenos en Tarapacá a través de la correspondencia del Cónsul Antonio Solari Millas" (PDF). Revista de Ciencias Sociales (in Spanish). 14: 84. Archived from the original (PDF) on 27 September 2016.
- Vicuña Mackenna, Benjamin (1880). Historia de la campaña de Tarapacá (in Spanish). Santiago, Chile: Imprenta i Litografía de Pedro Cadot.
- Pinto Vallejos, Julio (1993). "Cortar raíces, criar fama". Historia (in Spanish). 27: 425–447. Archived from the original on 2016-10-10.
- Verbal Stockmeyer, Valentina (2014). "El Ejército de Chile en vísperas de la Guerra del Pacífico. Una visión de las tropas (1866-1879)". Historia 396 (in Spanish). 4 (1): 135–165.
- Villalobos, Sergio (2004). Chile y Perú, la historia que nos une y nos separa, 1535-1883 (in Spanish) (2nd ed.). Chile: Editorial Universitaria. ISBN 9789561116016.
