= Anti-Chilean sentiment =

Racism and discrimination against Chile, its people, and culture

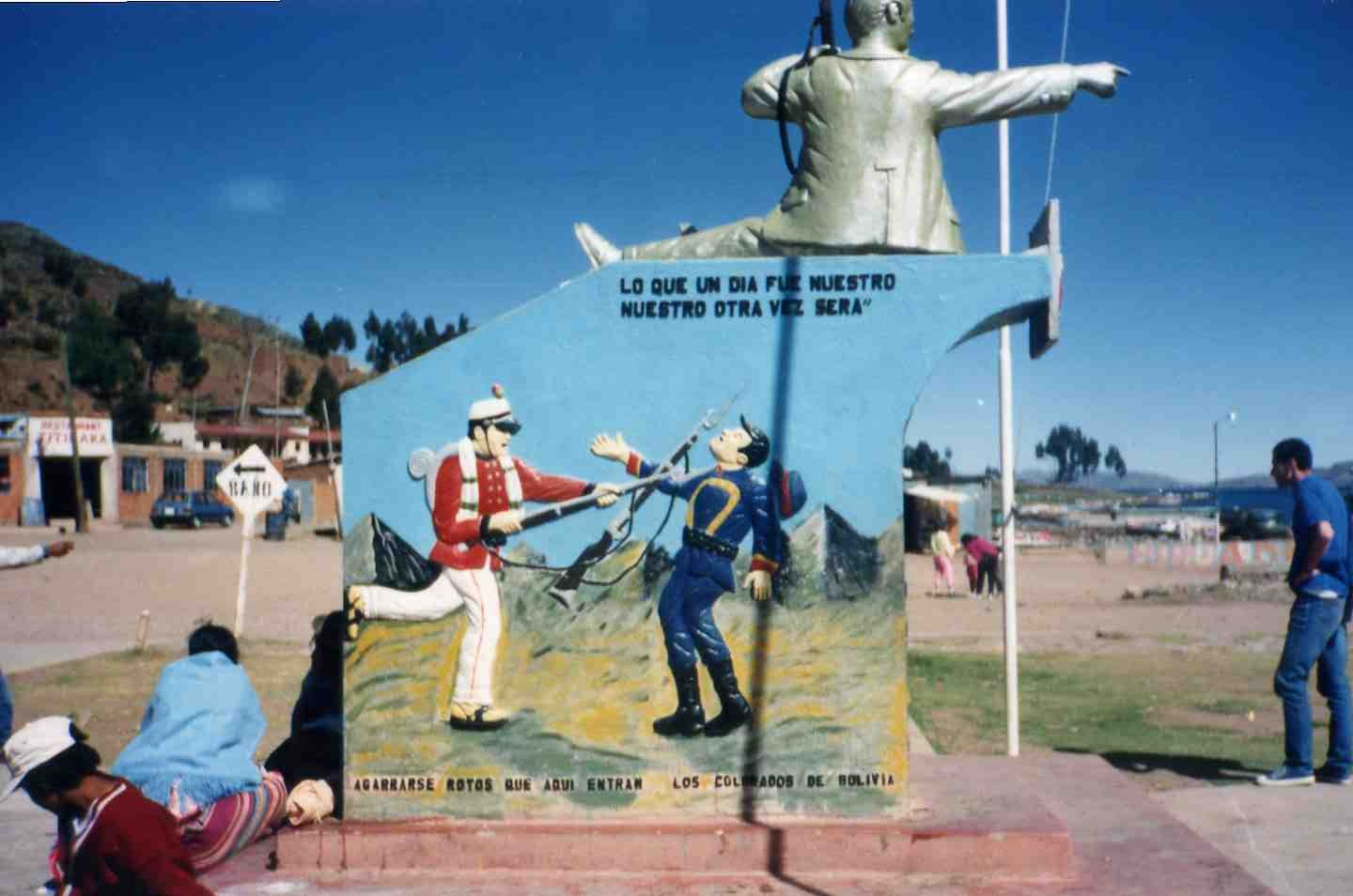
An example of expressions of Bolivian irredentism over territorial losses in the War of the Pacific (1879–1884). In the mural it is written; "What once was ours, will be ours once again", and "Hold fast rotos (Chileans), for here come the Colorados of Bolivia"

Anti-Chilean sentiment (Spanish: antichilenismo) or Chilenophobia (Spanish: chilenofobia) refers to the historical and current resentment towards Chile, Chileans, or Chilean culture. Anti-Chilean sentiment is most prevalent among Chile's neighbors Argentina, Bolivia and Peru. Most recently even wider anti-Chilean sentiment comes from countries such as Colombia, Haiti and Venezuela.

One of the historic causes of anti-Chilean sentiment is the perceived Chilean expansionism that took place during the 19th century when Chile won the War of the Pacific. The sentiment also applied to Chilean immigration in Argentina and the United States.

== History ==
=== Argentina ===
Despite no war erupting between the two nations, there have been elements of anti-Chilean sentiment in Argentina in the past and present. Anti-Chilean sentiment in Argentina can be blamed on the historical and ongoing border disputes in the Patagonia region. In addition, the events that occurred during the Beagle conflict in 1978 resulted in many anti-Chilean speeches and rhetoric in the Argentine media. Argentine General Luciano Benjamin Menendez was a leading advocate for war during the conflict and was known for his aggressive and vulgar discourse against Chileans.

=== Bolivia ===
In Bolivia, anti-Chilean sentiment is fueled by Bolivian claims for territory in the Pacific coast. A common political discourse attributes Bolivia's underdevelopment to its loss of seaports in the War of the Pacific becoming thus a landlocked country. This anti-Chilean sentiment has been exploited by Bolivian politicians for more than a century

=== Peru ===
In Peru when the War of the Pacific began in 1879, Peru changed the name of its national dance from "chilena" to "marinera". The Peruvian government expelled Chilean citizens from their lands in 1879, the question of the sovereignty of Tacna and Arica. President Augusto Leguía used the term "Captive Provinces" in order to win over the inhabitants of the disputed provinces to Peru. Later, the occupation of Lima, the province of Tacna and the massacres against Peruvian civilians by Chilean soldiers increased anti-Chilean sentiment in those areas.

The defeat in the war rooted a strong anti-Chilean sentiment in much of Peruvian society and Peru was plunged into a period of instability and backwardness that, according to many authors, came to question its very viability as a country during the period of National Reconstruction (1883-1895). Every October 8, the naval battle of Angamos is commemorated with a national holiday, when Miguel Grau died, recognized as the "Greatest hero of Peru". From 1968 to 1980 during the Revolutionary Government of the Armed Forces, General Juan Velasco Alvarado again used the term captive provinces to refer to the territories that today comprise the Chilean regions of Arica and Parinacota and Tarapacá.

In 2006, the Commander-in-Chief of the Peruvian Army, Edwin Donayre, stated, "I have given the order that any Chilean who enters will no longer leave, they will leave in a box. If there are not enough boxes, they will leave in plastic bag" (Spanish: «He dado la consigna que chileno que entra ya no sale, saldrá en cajón. Si no hay suficientes cajones, saldrán en bolsas de plástico»), causing laughter among those present. Then-Peruvian presidential candidate Ollanta Humala gave a speech that was described in Chile as anti-Chilean. The bicycle kick football technique, known to most Spanish speakers as the "chilena", is called the "chalaca" in Peru. The Chilean anthem is booed in Peru prior to football matches between the senior national teams. In 2017, the Peruvian national football team celebrated their qualification for the 2018 World Cup with the chant, "He who doesn't jump is a Chilean!" (Spanish: «¡El que no salta es un chileno!») started by Christian Cueva, since the Chilean national football team is considered there as their "greatest rival" and was the most shouted by their fans. La Razón is recognized as the "most anti-Chilean newspaper in Peru", founded as part of the chicha press.

Citizens of multiple countries also believe they have been economically exploited by Chilean businesses over the last decade, which have taken over large market shares of various consumer businesses, especially retail (Cencosud, Falabella, Ripley) and banking. Ironically, Peruvian and Bolivian citizens constitute the bigger immigrant groups in Chile.

=== Outside from South America ===
Outside of South America during the California Gold Rush, Chileans experienced a high degree of anti-Chilean sentiment by United States miners. Chilean businesses and mine workers were usually harassed and at times violently attacked.

== Anti-Chilean terminology ==
In Argentina the word Chilote is the degrading term for Chileans, instead of Chileno which is the correct word for Chilean. Normally a Chilote is an inhabitant of the Archipelago of Chiloé (part of Chile) and so Chileans do not feel it is an insult, but it is rather as ignorance from Argentinians since in Argentina, the word has been picked up to describe any Chilean. But they really feel insulted when Argentines refer to them as traitor, mainly for a widespread feeling of betrayal that they felt while Chile offered support to United Kingdom during the Falklands War in 1982.

In Peru and Bolivia, the word roto ("tattered") is used to refer disdainfully to Chileans. The term roto was first applied to Spanish conquerors in Chile, who were badly dressed and preferred military strength over intellect. In modern usage, roto is an offensive term used to disparage the ill-mannered mentally-broken people or those whom the speaker wishes to associate with the ill-mannered.

Rotos chilenos and Chilenos rotos later applied to "broken and impoverished" lower classes (generally peasants). The terms were first applied to Chileans during the War of the Confederation; specifically, Chilean soldiers received the name from Peruvian soldiers. The term later became used by Chileans themselves in praise of the conscript soldiers of the Pacific War era, to indicate determination despite adversity.

== See also ==
- Maximum neighbor hypothesis
- Anti-Peruvian sentiment
- Día del Mar
- Ethnocacerism
- Nacionalismo
- Racism in Chile
- Revanchism
- War of the Pacific
