= Maximum neighbor hypothesis =

Strategic defense concept used in Chile

In red, the countries hostile to Chile under the three neighbor hypothesis.

The Maximum neighbor hypothesis (hipótesis vecinal máxima in Spanish) or neighbor hypothesis 3 (hipótesis vecinal 3; HV3 in Spanish) is a strategic concept used in international analysis and defense in Chile since the late 19th century. It argues that in the event of a conflict with one neighboring country, it is highly likely that the other two border countries will side with the first one against Chile. HV3 has been studied in military and political circles based on historical precedents and the dynamics of international relations in the region.

== Origins and fundamentals ==
The hypothesis is based on a historical analysis of Chile's relations with Argentina, Bolivia, and Peru. Since these countries' independence, territorial disputes and diplomatic conflicts have shaped the perception of potential alliances in case of conflict.

The foundations of HV3 include:

1. Historical disputes: Chile has had territorial conflicts with all three neighbors, such as the War of the Pacific (1879–1884) with Peru and Bolivia, and the Beagle Channel dispute (1904–1984) with Argentina.
2. Expansionist and revanchist tendencies: the theory suggests Argentina seeks Pacific access, Peru maintains aspirations over Arica and Tarapacá, while Bolivia continues to demand sovereign access to the sea.
3. Patterns of past alliances: Argentina, Bolivia, and Peru have often shown diplomatic and historiographical solidarity in their disputes against Chile.
4. Perception in defense: Chilean Armed Forces' strategic assessments consider a likely coordinated pressure from the other two neighbors in the event of conflict.

== Background ==
Throughout history, various events have suggested the possibility of a regional coalition against Chile:

- 1873: Bolivia and Peru signed a secret agreement known as the Treaty of Defensive Alliance (1873), aimed at mutual protection in case of external aggression. Argentina was invited to join; although the Argentine Chamber of Deputies approved the proposal, the Senate rejected it.
- 1878: Argentina sought to align with Peru and Bolivia to form a military alliance against Chile due to the looming War of the Pacific. However, Chile's naval victories at the Battle of Iquique and Battle of Angamos discouraged Argentina from ratifying the alliance.
- 1881: Argentina threatened to open a southern war front against Chile if the Treaty of 1881 was not signed. General Julio Argentino Roca’s original plan aimed to sever Chile at the latitude of Puerto Montt and seize its southern territories.
- 1890: During conferences in Washington, Argentina proposed nullifying Chile’s gains from the War of the Pacific, with support from Bolivia and Peru. Chile refused to engage, and the proposal was shelved.
- 1898: Bolivia ceded the Puna de Atacama to Argentina, nearly provoking armed conflict. There were fears that Bolivia and Peru would join forces to reclaim Tarapacá and Antofagasta.
- 1902: Chile and Argentina were on the brink of war over the Patagonian watershed boundary dispute. It is speculated that Peru and Bolivia anticipated the conflict and were prepared to intervene.
- 1920: Peru supported a coup in Bolivia that brought to power a government with an anti-Chilean stance. Though there is no direct evidence of Argentine involvement, there were efforts toward trilateral alignment against Chile.
- 1944: Peronist military circles in Argentina planned an invasion of Chile, possibly with support from Peru and Bolivia. The United States intervened to prevent the operation.
- 1952: Argentina occupied territory in Alto Palena, triggering a border crisis. There is evidence of coordination with Peru and Bolivia during the dispute.
- 1962: Bolivia attempted to invoke the TIAR against Chile over the use of the Lauca River, with Peru and Argentina reportedly considering intervention.
- 1975–1978: Chile and Argentina were hours away from war during the 1977–1978 crisis related to the Beagle conflict. Argentina had developed an invasion plan called "Operation Soberanía." Peru and Bolivia reinforced their military capabilities and were involved in coordinated attack plans. The Peruvian government of Juan Velasco Alvarado, bolstered by massive Soviet and European arms acquisitions, devised a plan known as “Negro” to invade Chilean territory, with D-Day set for 6 August. The plan aimed to capture Arica, Iquique, and eventually Antofagasta, which would be transferred to Bolivia as part of a geopolitical strategy. Meanwhile, Chile, aware of its military disadvantage, took defensive measures including laying mines on the border and reinforcing its presence in Arica. Additionally, Chile sought to prevent Bolivia from allying with Argentina and Peru by offering it sovereign access to the Pacific through the Charaña Accords.

== Foreign policy and defense implications ==
HV3 has influenced Chile's foreign and defense policies, including:

- Deterrence policy: Chile has maintained strong military capabilities as a deterrent.
- Balancing diplomacy: maintaining even-handed bilateral relations with each neighbor.
- Extra-regional alliances: strengthening ties with non-regional powers and multilateral bodies.
- Use of anti-personnel and anti-tank landmines during the 1970s–1980s.

== Criticism ==
HV3 has been criticized as a pessimistic view of international relations in South America. Critics argue regional integration processes have diminished the likelihood of war.

However, supporters claim that history shows a repeated pattern of Argentina, Bolivia, and Peru acting together on territorial matters against Chile, justifying the hypothesis' ongoing relevance.

HV3 remains a reference point in Chilean foreign policy and defense planning. Though sometimes criticized as excessively realist, it still influences Chile's national security strategy.

== See also ==
- Borders of Chile
- Casus belli
- Continental shelf of Chile
