= Atacama Desert border dispute =

Dispute between Bolivia and Chile

The Atacama Desert border dispute between Bolivia and Chile (1825–1879)

The Atacama Desert and the Puna in 1830.

The Atacama Desert border dispute was a dispute between Bolivia and Chile from 1825 to 1879 for the territories of the Atacama coast due to the different views in the countries over what territory they inherited from the Spanish Empire. Treaties were signed to settle the border in 1866 and 1874. The dispute occurred prior to the War of the Pacific, which resolved it in favor of Chile. The surrender of land by Bolivia led to the Puna de Atacama dispute between Chile and Argentina, which was settled in 1899.

== Origins ==
The origins of the dispute came from the borders established in the Spanish empire that just defined the Atacama desert as the northern border of the General Captaincy of Chile. Bolivian and Chilean historians disagree on whether the territory of Charcas, originally part of the Viceroyalty of Peru, later of the Viceroyalty of the Río de la Plata and ultimately of Bolivia, included access to the sea. Supporting their claims with different documents, Bolivians claim that it did while Chileans disagree. When Simón Bolívar established Bolivia as a nation in 1825, he claimed access to the sea, disregarding overlapping claims by Chile, which had gained independence 7 years before.

The border dispute between Bolivia and Chile grew slowly during most of the 19th century over the Atacama corridor, a part of the Atacama Desert which now forms northern Chile. The Atacama Desert is bordered by the Coast Range on the west and the Andes on the east. The geography of the area was a very large factor in determining how the border dispute began. Because of the mountains, the area has rains only 2 to 4 times a century, making it one of the driest places on Earth.

After the independence of Chile (1818) and Bolivia (1825) none of the following governments of both countries cared about defining its borders. National boundaries in the Atacama region had still not been definitely determined when nitrate, silver and copper deposits were discovered in the area. Both Bolivia and Chile established competing claims for the territory. Other countries' interest was drawn due to the importance of nitrates in the production of fertilizer and high explosives; Britain, Spain and the United States had a strategic and economic stake in controlling the resource granting their support to the different parties. Chile's influence grew in the disputed zone as miners, some of them backed by Chilean and foreign companies, started to advance northwards establishing mines and port facilities. Most economic exploitation of the coastal region was being conducted by Chilean companies and British interests, under the aegis of Chile's more robust economy and more stable institutions.

== Boundary Treaty of 1866 ==
National borders in the region had not been clearly agreed until 1866; the two countries had negotiated a treaty that established the 24th parallel south as their boundary, and entitled Bolivia and Chile to share in tax revenue on mineral exports out of the territory between the 23rd and 25th parallels.

== The War of the Pacific ==
Borders between Peru, Bolivia, Chile and Argentina before and after the 1879 War of the Pacific. The shaded region now belongs to Chile and Argentina.

On 27 November 1873 the Antofagasta Nitrate & Railway Company signed a contract with the Bolivian government that would have authorized it to extract saltpeter duty-free for 25 years.

A second treaty in 1874 superseded the 1866 treaty, entitling Bolivia to collect full tax revenue between the 23rd and 24th parallels, but stipulating that tax rates on Chilean companies could not increase for 25 years.

In February 1878, The Bolivian Congress and a National Constituent Assembly found the contract incomplete because it had not been ratified by Congress as required by the Bolivian Constitution of 1871. Subsequently, the Congress would approve the contract only if the company would pay a 10 cents tax per quintal of mineral extracted. Chile claimed that the border treaty of 1874 did not allow for such a tax hike. The company complained the increased payments were illegal. The company mounted significant pressure and demanded that the Chilean government intervene.

When the Antofagasta Nitrate & Railway Company refused to pay, the Bolivian government under President Hilarión Daza threatened to confiscate its property. Chile responded by sending a warship to the area in December 1878. Bolivia announced the seizure and auction of the company on 14 February 1879. Chile, in turn, threatened that such action would render the border treaty null and void.

In 1873 Peru and Bolivia had signed a secret Treaty of Mutual Defense. In April 1879, shortly after becoming aware of the alliance treaty between Peru and Bolivia, Chile declared war on both countries. Within four years Chile defeated the joint war efforts of Bolivia and Peru. It ultimately led to the Chilean annexation of the Peruvian Tarapacá department and Arica province, as well as the Bolivian department of Litoral, leaving Bolivia as a landlocked country.

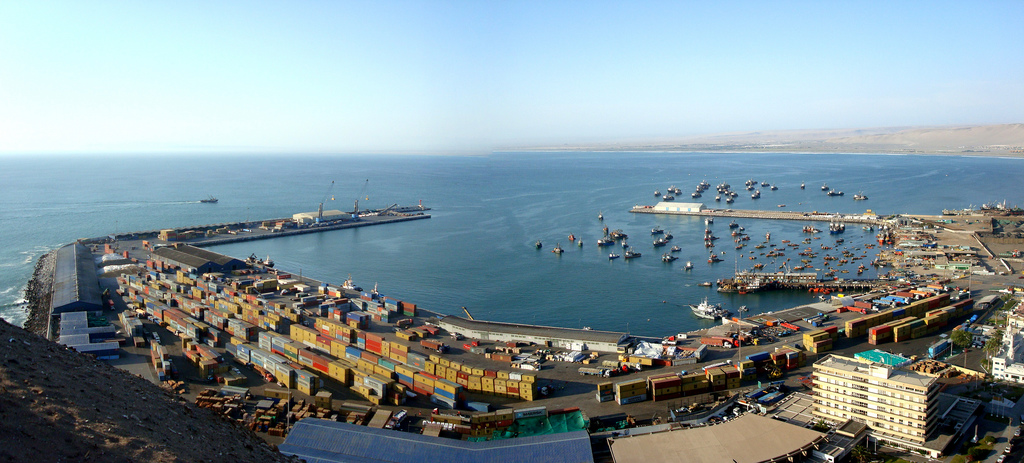
Arica port in 2008

In 1884, Bolivia signed a truce that gave control to Chile of the entire Bolivian coast, the province of Antofagasta, and its valuable nitrate, copper and other mineral deposits. The two countries signed the Treaty of Peace and Friendship in 1904, which made this arrangement permanent. Chile built a railroad connecting the Bolivian capital of La Paz with the port of Arica and guaranteed freedom of transit for Bolivian commerce through Chilean ports and territory.

== Chilean proposal of 1975 ==
Pinochet's proposed corridor

In 1975, the Chilean government of Augusto Pinochet made a proposal to Bolivia consisting in a swap of a narrow continuous corridor of Chilean land from the sea to the border between Chile and Bolivia, running parallel to the border between Chile and Peru, making the Lluta River Chile's northern border, in exchange for the same amount of Bolivian territory. The proposal, known as the Charaña Accords, involved former Peruvian land and according to the treaty of Ancón, Chile could not give former Peruvian territories to other nations without Peru's agreement. The dictator of Peru Francisco Morales-Bermúdez was opposed to these changes but proposed to make Arica a territory governed by the three states. Chile responded that it could not accept this complicated shared sovereignty. Since Pinochet was likely aware that the Charaña proposals would fail in the end due to Peruvian opposition, legal and political analysts have suggested that he raised them just as a gesture towards Bolivia.

== Recent history ==
Bolivia still wishes for an Atacama corridor, which Chile rejects. In spite of this conflict, Chile grants unrestricted access to all kinds of Bolivian merchandise through the Atacama. The territories ceded by Bolivia and Peru contain some of world's largest copper deposits. These are mined by Codelco, a state-owned mining company that contributes a significant part of the Chilean state's income.

Peru has ceded a small leased territory to Bolivia for sea access called Bolivia Mar, but Bolivia is mostly uninterested in it due to repercussions of Chile's being able to assert that Bolivia doesn't need any of its land for sea access.

During the Bolivian Gas War the dispute rose again as most Bolivians, including Evo Morales (who would go on to become president), opposed the future export of Bolivian gas through Chilean territory, which the government and foreign companies wanted. In 2004, the anniversary of the 1904 treaty, Bolivian claims were reignited, and the words gas-for-sea became the slogan of those who opposed exportation. The dispute became evident when the Bolivian president Carlos Mesa engaged in a public spat with the Chilean president Ricardo Lagos at the Organization of American States. Mesa, who was under pressure to speak out on Bolivia's aspirations, put the topic before all the presidents of the Americas. The Chilean president reacted by mentioning Bolivia's refusal to have diplomatic relations with Chile, and with this in mind he offered diplomatic relationships between the two countries here and now. The offer was hastily declined by Mesa, who was not actually seeking an offer but intended to attract international interest to the situation.

Bolivian president Evo Morales decided to break off all dialogue with Chile on the maritime issue, opting instead to pursue the issue in litigation in international courts. He thus broke an OAS resolution in 2012 wherein the majority of member states encouraged Bolivia to pursue the issue via bilateral dialogue with Chile. Chilean president Sebastian Piñera pleaded with Evo Morales to continue with the dialogue but to no avail. The Bolivian government followed through with its determination to file a case with the International Court of Justice on 24 April 2013. Surprisingly, the case did not challenge the border treaties signed by both countries which Evo Morales has always been against. The basis of the case stemmed from two bilateral negotiations in the 1970s and 1950s where a sovereign route to the Pacific was allegedly promised by Chile but never eventuated. Bolivia argues "the rights of expectations" for their case which is a commercial law term that had never been used in the ICJ. In October 2018, the International Court of Justice issued a final and binding decision that Chile was not obliged to negotiate granting Bolivia sea access.

In March 2021, Bolivian president Luis Arce, on occasion of Día del Mar, said that the dispute is "open and pending" issue between the two countries and offered a nine-point plan to establish diplomatic negotiations with Chile to solve the dispute. The Chilean government responded that it was willing to establish dialogue but that the issue had already been settled by the International Court of Justice. During the 2021 Chilean presidential campaign, communist candidate Daniel Jadue argued in favor of a "mutually beneficial" agreement with Bolivia, in which territory would be ceded in exchange for Chile acquiring some gas and water rights. Jadue has clarified that he would only support such an arrangement were it to receive a democratic mandate through a plebiscite.

== See also ==
- Anti-Chilean sentiment
- Bolivia–Chile relations
- Puna de Atacama dispute
- Chilean–Peruvian territorial dispute
- East Patagonia, Tierra del Fuego and Strait of Magellan Dispute
- Foreign policy of the Ollanta Humala administration
- List of International Court of Justice cases
- Chilean Sea
- Antártica Chilena Province
- Chilean Antarctic Territory
- Patagonia
- Movimiento Archipiélago Soberano
