= Boundary Treaty of 1866 between Chile and Bolivia =

1866 treaty between Chile and Bolivia

Boundary Treaty between Bolivia and Chile of 1866
Mutual Benefits Treaty
- Except for the 24°S boundary, none of the borders was officially set in 1866. The black line is the 1929 border.
- Type: Boundary and economic
- Signed: October 8, 1866
- Location: Santiago, Chile
- Negotiators: Mariano Donato Muñoz; Aniceto Vergara Albano
- Signatories: Juan R. Muñoz Cabrera; Álvaro Covarrúbias
- Parties: Bolivia; Chile
- Language: Spanish

Full text
- Boundary Treaty between Bolivia and Chile of 1866 at Wikisource

The Boundary Treaty of 1866 between Chile and Bolivia, also called the Mutual Benefits Treaty, was signed in Santiago de Chile on August 10, 1866, by the Chilean Foreign Affairs Minister Álvaro Covarrubias and the Bolivian Plenipotentiary in Santiago Juan R. Muñoz Cabrera. It drew, for the first time, the border between both countries at the 24° South parallel from the Pacific Ocean to the eastern border of Chile and defined a zone of bipartite tax collection, the "Mutual Benefits zone", and tax preferences for articles from Bolivia and Chile.

Despite increasing border tensions since the 1840s, both countries fought together against Spain in the Chincha Islands War (1864–65) and resolved the question under the Governments of Mariano Melgarejo in Bolivia and José Joaquín Pérez in Chile. But before long, both countries were discontented with it, and Peru and Bolivia signed a secret treaty against Chile in 1873. The Lindsay-Corral protocol, thought to clarify the treaty, was approved by Chile but never by Bolivia.

In 1874, a new boundary treaty was signed, which was violated by Bolivia in 1878. In 1879 began the War of the Pacific.

== Background ==
The Atacama border dispute between Bolivia and Chile (1825-1879)

After the Spanish American Wars of Independence, the new Latin American republics adopted as a common juridical principle of frontier demarcation the administrative limits existing at the moment of separation from Spain. This was termed in Uti possidetis of 1810, a formula devised mainly to prevent European nations from setting foot in America, on the plea that between one heritage and another there were vacant regions susceptible of being title of res nullius.

In particular, remote regions, sparsely populated or uninhabited areas, inhospitable climate, and sparse local vegetation caused a lack of geographical knowledge and hence administrative determination of the borders. However, political unrest also led to changes, like the Province of Tarija in colonial Argentina, which after independence wanted to come under Bolivian administration. On the other hand, European powers and the United States never recognized the principle of uti possidetis 1810, such as in the Falkland Islands. Since uncertainty characterized the demarcation of frontiers according to the uti possidetis 1810, several long-running border conflicts arose in America after independence throughout the 19th century.

Bolivia had claimed territories down to 26° South since its independence. In 1842, the Chilean government of Manuel Bulnes declared the 23° South parallel of latitude (near Mejillones) as the northern frontier of Chile it was then impossible to foresee the enormous importance of guano and nitrate.

From that day onward, conflicts of jurisdiction between Chilea and Bolivia were frequent. The Chilean ship Rumenia was carried to Cobija, the Bolivian port, and the Bolivian Sportsman to Caldera, Chile. Between 1842 and 1862, there were unsuccessful attempts at conciliation by both governments.

The situation could not continue indefinitely. Every day, the affair became more acute sonce more interest was being taken in guano due to the increase in the revenue of Peru due to the deposits on the Chincha islands. The controversy became critical on 5 June 1863 as the Bolivian Congress secretly empowered the executive to declare war on Chile.

An unexpected situation arose that modified the political relations of the Pacific countries: the war declared by Spain on Peru and Spain's reassertion of its claims to the Chincha islands. The Pacific countries became alarmed, and Chile, Bolivia, and Ecuador made common cause with Peru. Previous differences were considered as being of secondary importance, and Bolivia and Chile sought to end the border conflict. Interrupted diplomatic relations were resumed, and on 10 August 1866, the Boundary Treaty was signed in Santiago.

== Terms the treaty ==
The treaty stipulated in seven articles:

- The international boundary will, in future, be drawn at the 24th parallel, and will be marked out on the ground "by means of visible and permanent signals — from the Pacific to the eastern boundary of Chile" by experts nominated by both countries.
- Notwithstanding the previous declaration, Chile and Bolivia shall divide between them the export duties paid on Guano and minerals in the zone included between the 23rd and 25th parallels.
- For the carrying out of this, Bolivia shall set up a custom-house in Mejillones which will be the only one authorized to receive these duties on the exportation of guano and metals from the aforesaid zone. Chile will have the right to nominate fiscal employees -who shall intervene in the counting house department of this aduana with full right of inspection. Bolivia will be conceded an equal right in the event of Chile establishing a custom-house in parallel 24°.
- All exports from the territory situated between the parallels of latitude 23° to 25°, with the exception of guano and minerals, to be free from taxation, as will also be the natural production of Chile which may enter the country through Mejillones.
- By common accord between the two governments system will be adopted in the exploitation and sale of guano, and a similar agreement must he come to, to determine the duties on the exportation of minerals.
- Chile and Bolivia bind themselves to mutual preference in the event of the renting of the territories forming the subject matter of the present agreement, and to abstain from ceding them to any nation or individual.
- Eighty thousand pesos, withdrawn from ten percent, of the production of Mejillones will be granted to Bolivian concessionaries in guano exploitation whose, workings were suspended by act of the Chilean Government.

== Flaws ==
Regarding the Treaty of Mutual Benefits, Ronald Bruce St. John stated:

Differing interpretations of the 1866 treaty soon complicated diplomatic relations between Bolivia and Chile. The agreement did not specify by name the individual items from which Chile was to derive half the fiscal revenues under the condominium provision, and the Bolivian government tried to limit their number with predictably caustic results. In an apparent effort to avoid sharing customs receipts, the Bolivian government also sought to export minerals extracted from the shared zone through the northern port of Cobija. A related controversy centred on a Bolivian contention that Caracoles, an immensely valuable silver deposit discovered in 1870, did not lie within the zone of condominium. With the ousting of the Melgarejo administration in 1871, the new Bolivian government hoped to revise the terms of the 1866 treaty and thus abolish the condominium aspects of the pact. When this was not forthcoming the Bolivian National Assembly declared null and void all acts of the Melgarejo administration and made it clear that the 1866 treaty was in jeopardy.

As a matter of fact, the treaty settled nothing, left everything pending, and opened the door to difficulties greater than those that it had attempted to settle.

== Lindsay-Corral Protocol of 1872 ==
On 5 December 1872, after difficult talks, the Bolivian and Chilean negotiators, Corral and Lindsay agreed to a clarification of the treaty of 1866. The Lindsay-Corral Protocol gave Chile the right to appoint customs officers to work alongside their Bolivian counterparts in the condominium zone; stipulated that tax rates could not be modified unilaterally; confirmed Bolivian acceptance of nitrates and borax as products included in the terms of the 1866 treaty; agreed that Bolivia would make a separate account of the amount to be received for taxes not derived from the common zone; and stated that the eastern limits of the common zone would be fixed by experts of both countries and, in case of disagreement, by a third nominated by the Emperor of Brazil. This Protocol was approved by Chile in January 1873.

A new grievance arose in August 1872 as Quintin Quevedo, a Bolivian general and a follower of Mariano Melgarejo who had been toppled as president in 1871, embarked on an expedition from Valparaiso against the Bolivian government without any effective action by the Chilean authorities despite a warning by the Peruvian and the Bolivian consulates of weapons and men on board the ships: the Maria Luisa and then Paquete de Los Vilos.

Peru, which then enjoyed naval supremacy in the South Pacific, responded with a naval demonstration in Mejillones by sending the Huascar and the Chalaco to there. Peruvian Minister of Foreign Affairs Jose de la Riva Agüero told the Chilean government that Peru would not view with indifference the occupation of Bolivian territory by foreign forces.

In October 1872, the Bolivian Assembly authorized the executive to sign a treaty of alliance with Peru without the necessity for further legislative consultation. That finally became the Secret treaty of alliance between Peru and Bolivia of 1873, signed on February 6, 1873, in Lima.

The Peruvian government saw the Lindsay-Corral Protocol as an increase in the regional influence of Chile and urged Bolivia to reject it, and on May 19, 1873, the Bolivian Assembly postponed approval to 1874. The Assembly never approved or refused the treaty.

In 1874, representatives of Bolivia and Chile reopened talks, which concluded with the Treaty of Sucre or Boundary Treaty between Bolivia and Chile of 1874 (see English version in Boundary Treaty between Bolivia and Chile of 1874). The pact kept 24th degrees South as the boundary between Bolivia and Chile, and Chile relinquished its former rights of condominium in return for no future nitrate tax increases over Chilean companies.

== See also ==
- War of the Pacific
- Bolivia-Chile relations

== Bibliography ==
- Orrego Luco, Luis (1900). Los problemas internacionales de Chile; la cuestion boliviana (1900) (in Spanish). Santiago, Chile: Imprenta Mejia.
- Ronald Bruce St John, International Boundaries Research Unit, BOUNDARY & TERRITORY BRIEFING, Volume 1 Number 6, The Bolivia-Chile-Peru Dispute in the Atacama Desert
- Bulnes, Gonzalo (1920). Chile and Peru: the causes of the war of 1879. Santiago, Chile: Imprenta Universitaria.
- Jefferson Dennis, William (1927). Documentary history of the Tacna-Arica dispute from University of Iowa studies in the social sciences. Vol. 8. Iowa: University Iowa City.
