= Obligation to Negotiate Access to the Pacific Ocean =

International law case (decided 2018)

- Court: International Court of Justice
- Full case name: Obligation to Negotiate Access to the Pacific Ocean (Bolivia v. Chile)
- Decided: October 1, 2018
- Citation: I.C.J. Reports 2015, p. 592
- Transcript: Oral proceedings

Case opinions
- The Republic of Chile did not undertake a legal obligation to negotiate a sovereign access to the Pacific Ocean for the Plurinational State of Bolivia.

Obligation to Negotiate Access to the Pacific Ocean (Bolivia v. Chile) was a case at the International Court of Justice. In the case, Bolivia petitioned the Court for a writ of mandamus obligating Chile to negotiate with Bolivia to restore Bolivia's access to the Pacific Ocean, which it had lost to Chile in 1879 during the War of the Pacific. In 2018, the court rejected Bolivia's arguments, finding that Chile was under no such obligation.

== Background ==
Map showing 1879 border changes after the War of the Pacific, with the territory under dispute bordered in black

When Bolivia gained independence from Spain in 1825, it controlled the Atacama Desert and thus had direct access to the Pacific Ocean. As a result of disputes over control and taxation of natural resources, Bolivia and Peru went to war with Chile in 1879. During the ensuing War of the Pacific, Bolivia lost territory to Chile, including its entire coastline, and the war ended with the Treaty of Ancón and the Treaty of Valparaíso.

In the Treaty of Ancón, Chile and Peru agreed that a plebiscite would be used to determine territorial control, and that neither nation could cede contested territory to a third without the consent of both. In the Treaty of Valparaíso, Bolivia and Chile agreed that Chile would temporarily administer territory taken from Bolivia, and that Bolivia had a right to freely trade at Chilean ports. In 1895, Chile and Bolivia agreed to the Treaty on the Transfer of Territories, under which Chile would sell Tacna and Arica to Bolivia. However, this treaty was never implemented, as neither of the nations' congresses approved the agreement. In the 1904 Treaty of Peace and Friendship, Bolivia and Chile agreed that Antofagasta, the territory taken by Chile during the war, would be Chilean, and, in exchange, a railroad would be constructed, at Chile's expense, between Arica and La Paz. Also, Bolivia would be granted free trade rights at Chile's Pacific ports and allowed to establish customs facilities in them.

Since the treaty, Bolivia has attempted to obtain some form of sovereign access to the Pacific Ocean, and both nations have engaged in occasional negotiations in attempts to resolve the issue. In 1920, the representatives of the two nations met in La Paz. At this meeting, Chilean representatives said that they were "willing to seek that Bolivia acquire its own access to the sea, ceding to it an important part of that zone in the north of Arica and of the railway line which is within the territories subject to the plebiscite stipulated in the Treaty of Ancón." In 1926, Miguel Cruchaga, the Chilean ambassador to the United States, discussed the possibility of dividing the contested territory between Bolivia, Chile, and Peru with Frank B. Kellogg, the United States Secretary of State. After this, Bolivia sought resolution to the disagreement at the League of Nations, despite objections from Chile, which sought unilateral negotiations. In 1950, the two nations agreed to enter into formal negotiations over the issue. However, instead they discussed improvements to the current arrangement. In the early 1960s, both countries sought negotiations, but they did not take place. In 1975 and 1976, Chile and Bolivia agreed to a territorial swap with the Charaña Accords, but, under the terms of the Treaty of Ancón, this would require the approval of Peru. Peru instead proposed a region of shared sovereignty between the three nations, which was rejected by both Chile and Bolivia. In 1978, Bolivia cut diplomatic ties with Chile, as a result of the lack of progress in negotiations. Since 1978, the two nations have not had full diplomatic relations, maintaining relations at a consular level. In recent years, unsuccessful attempts have been made by both nations to negotiate a resolution, at various venues.

Access to the Pacific Ocean has long been an issue in Bolivian politics. Despite lacking a coastline, Bolivia still has a navy, which was founded in 1963, and Bolivians annually celebrate the Day of the Sea. The Bolivian president, Evo Morales, made Bolivia's access to the ocean a key issue for his administration. He also used it to bolster his reelection efforts. When Pope Francis visited Bolivia in 2015, he called for dialogue between the two nations, saying, "Dialogue is indispensable. Instead of raising walls, we need to be building bridges."

== Case and arguments ==
In 2013, Bolivia suspended ongoing negotiations and brought a petition against Chile before the International Court of Justice (ICJ). In the petition, Bolivia asked that the ICJ find that Chile was obligated to negotiate with Bolivia towards granting Bolivia sovereign access to the sea. In 2014, Chile raised preliminary objections to the court's jurisdiction, citing Article VI of the Pact of Bogotá, which prohibited ICJ proceedings on matters agreed upon prior to its agreement in 1948. Chile argued that the 1904 Treaty of Peace and Friendship settled all issues regarding the border, and that, while Bolivia had a right to non-sovereign access through Chilean territory, it had no right to sovereign access. Bolivia contended that the issue was an obligation independent of the treaty. Chile countered that the issue was one of territorial sovereignty. According to Zach Kleiman, the ruling on the preliminary objection would be determined by the definition of the case's subject matter. On 24 September 2015, the court found that it did have jurisdiction to hear the case, rejecting Chile's preliminary objection, and finding that the case was in respect of an obligation separate from the Treaty of Peace and Friendship. The court also reframed the complaint, limiting it solely to an obligation to negotiate without specifying the goal. Judge Gaja voted against the majority opinion's findings and, in a separate declaration, proposed that matters that had been settled could become unsettled through subsequent conduct. He stated that a determination on this issue would not be appropriate at the preliminary stage.

Bolivia argued that both nations were obligated to negotiate by their prior statements, basing parts of its argument on ICJ precedents, including Aegean Sea Continental Shelf (Greece v. Turkey) and Case Concerning Maritime Delimitation and Territorial Questions Between Qatar and Bahrain (Qatar v. Bahrain). Bolivia also argued that it had a right to coastal access because of the harmful economic effects of being landlocked. Zach Kleiman says that trade to and from Bolivia is much slower and more expensive than equivalent trade in Chile, and logistical costs are 31% higher than the average in the region. He also observed that in previous cases, such as Temple of Preah Vihear (Cambodia v. Thailand) and Nuclear Tests Case (New Zealand v. France), the court found that obligations were created through the unilateral conduct of officials.

== Outcome and results ==
On the Sunday preceding the decision, Catholic bishops in both countries asked congregants to accept the court's decision. In expectation of the decision, Bolivians gathered in public spaces across the country to watch the decision be read out on large screens erected for this purpose. On 1 October 2018, a twelve-judge majority ruled that Chile did not have an obligation to negotiate with Bolivia towards an access to the Pacific Ocean, rejecting Bolivia's complaint and all eight of its arguments. However, the court did not rule on which nation rightfully controlled the disputed territory. The court found that in none of the statements or actions of either country did the two countries show an intent to be legally bound. Alonso Dunkelberg suggests that the court ruled against Bolivia to avoid the possible precedent it would set "if passage of time in longstanding, stalemated disputes can change the way in which certain traditional terms are read." He further suggested that Bolivia could also have brought complaints about Chile's violations of the Treaty of Peace and Friendship, which it has previously raised at the Latin American Integration Association, and raised the possibility of Bolivia negotiating with Peru, which has previously agreed to treaties expanding Bolivia's rights to trade at the Peruvian coast.

While the court ruled against Bolivia, Abdulqawi Yusuf, president of the court, said that the ruling "should not be understood as precluding the parties from continuing their dialogue and exchanges, in a spirit of good neighborliness, to address the issues relating to the landlocked situation of Bolivia, the solution to which they have both recognized to be a matter of mutual interest." Evo Morales interpreted this as a "call to continue with the dialogue" and promised that Bolivia "will never give up" its pursuit of access to the Pacific Ocean. In response to the decision, Sebastián Piñera, the president of Chile, said that Morales "made us waste five years which could have been spent building a healthy relationship between the two countries." He also praised the court's decision, saying, "The court has done justice and has put things in their place, establishing clearly and categorically that Chile has never had any obligation to negotiate access to the sea."

After the decision, Morales continued efforts to begin negotiations with Chile. However, Bolivia also planned to decrease its dependence on Chilean ports by transitioning trade to Peruvian ports.
