= Charaña Accord =

Unrealized 1975 treaty

Charaña Accords
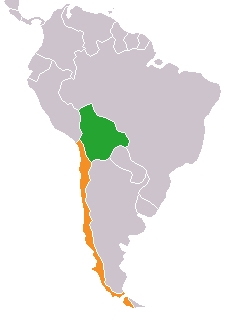
- Signed: 8 February 1975
- Location: Charaña, La Paz Department, Bolivia
- Condition: The treaty was vetoed by Peru
- Signatories: Bolivia; Chile
- Ratifiers: Hugo Banzer, Military dictator of Bolivia; Augusto Pinochet, Military dictator of Chile
- Language: Spanish

The Charaña Accord, also known as the Hug of Charaña or the Act of Charaña, is the name given to an unrealized treaty that was discussed between the dictators of Bolivia and Chile, Hugo Banzer and Augusto Pinochet respectively. These discussions took place mostly on the Bolivian train station of Charaña on February 8, 1975, and included the brief reestablishment of diplomatic relations between the two nations which had been severed on 1962 because of the Atacama border dispute which was to be solved via a Chilean proposal for the exchange of territories between Bolivia and Chile, with the former receiving a corridor to the Pacific Ocean which would provide it with access to the sea and Chile receiving an equivalent amount of territory from Bolivia along its border with Chile.

In the end, the proposal failed after Peru objected to it as Peru had veto power over any territorial exchange along its border due to previous international treaties it had with Chile and Bolivia. After the proposal failed Bolivia again severed diplomatic relations with Chile in 1978, which have not been resumed to this day while it still maintains a claim over a strip of Chilean land that would give it access to the sea which has historically been Bolivia's greatest ambition and desire; thus, the failure of this most recent attempt at a peaceful diplomatic solution to Bolivia's most prominent international dispute has continued to cast a negative shadow over its relation with Chile; a relation which today has been described as extremely tense at times and non-existent at others, but never easy or friendly.

The territorial dispute eventually culminated in a suit presented by Bolivia before the International Court of Justice at the Hague against Chile which Chile won in December 2018.

== Antecedents ==
Bolivia formerly possessed territories that gave it access to the sea in the form of a province named Littoral which was composed of the northern territories of Chile, especially its Antofagasta Region. The Litoral province possesses rich deposits of nitrates, mostly in the form of guano, which were extremely valuable as a source of gunpowder and explosives during the 19th century, and it provided Bolivia with its main source of revenue. In 1879, after a commercial dispute arose between Chilean companies that extracted these nitrates and the Bolivian government which wanted to increase its taxation of said companies, war broke out between Chile and Bolivia with Peru also declaring war on Chile as a result of a secret treaty it had with Bolivia. This conflict became known as the War of the Pacific and ended with a severe defeat of the Peruvian-Bolivian alliance after which Chile annexed all of Bolivia's coast in the form of the entire Litoral department and Peru's southernmost provinces of Tarapacá, Arica and Tacna: eventually, Tacna was returned to Peru but Arica and Tarapaca remained part of Chile as per the Treaty of Lima. Bolivia for its part first ceded Litoral to Chile by the Treaty of Valparaiso and the permanent loss was confirmed with the Treaty of Peace and Friendship of 1904.

The crippling loss of its access to the sea became a national trauma for Bolivia which continued to claim an outlet to the sea and between 1947 and 1950 formal discussions were held for the first time with Chile on the dispute: these initial discussions proposed the otorgation to Bolivia of a strip of land to the ocean in exchange for non-territorial compensations to Chile like giving it access to the use of waters from Lake Titicaca for agricultural purposes. The discussions, which were supposed to be secret, were soon leaked to the press and caused a strong negative public reaction in both countries; and in addition to this, Peru, which had not been informed of the negotiations, soon objected to any territorial exchange or agreements regarding the use of the waters of Lake Titicaca, prospects for both Peru held veto power due to past international treaties.

Furthermore, changes of government took place in Bolivia in 1952 after which a treaty was signed in 1957 between Bolivia and Peru which confirmed their joint ownership of Lake Titicaca and this precluded the future use of its waters as a future bargaining chip by Bolivia. All of this put an end to the negotiations.

After this failed first attempt the dispute remained but the political conditions in Chile changed in 1973 when the Right-leaning General Augusto Pinochet led a successful coup against the democratically elected Socialist president Salvador Allende who died in the coup. Pinochet's dictatorship would eventually alienate all world opinion and Chile became increasingly isolated in the international arena. This event pushed Chile to seek closer diplomatic relationships with any willing nation. In 1971 Bolivia lived a similar political process and the Right-leaning General Hugo Banzer also led a successful coup against the Left-leaning Juan José Torres and the ideological affinities and similarities between Banzer and Pinochet, along with Pinochet's search for new allies, made them much more receptive to opening negotiations again with the aim of solving the dispute and normalizing relations between the two nations, which would also mean a massive public relations coup for both leaders in their nations and an increase in popularity; especially for Banzer as the territorial dispute held (and still holds) a great significance for the Bolivian population.

Other factor that made the possibility of new negotiations more attractive was that Chile was facing increased tensions with Peru along their shared border and giving a strip of land to Bolivia along said border would remove any contact between Peru and Chile and add Bolivia as a buffer state between the two. With these situations, in March 1974 Pinochet met with Banzer and formally proposed the idea of giving Bolivia a corridor to the sea while Bolivia would give Chile a territory of the same extension someplace else along their common border.

== The agreement ==
Banzer agreed with holding further discussions with Pinochet to explore the feasibility of the territorial exchange and, if deemed practical, working out the details. With this, both dictators met in the Charaña train station, located around 1.3 miles from the border on the Bolivian side. First, both Banzer and Pinochet agreed on the reestablishment of diplomatic relations between their nations and the exchange of ambassadors (Rigoberto Díaz Gronow from Chile and Guillermo Gutiérrez Vea Murguia from Bolivia) and a promise to hold further discussions regarding the potential territory exchange.

Chilean proposal for the territorial cession of a corridor north of Arica.

== The territorial exchange ==
The negotiations on the agreement for the territorial exchange were trickier and would start on August 26, 1975, with the Bolivian ambassador Gutiérrez in Chile sending the Chilean government a memorandum establishing the preliminary ground positions of the Bolivian government about the territorial exchange; these included, of course, the cession to Bolivia of a sovereign territory that should include a coastal area with a length of at least 33.33 miles and 10 miles of width and the corridor should be contiguous and directly connect Bolivia to the ocean, the terms also stipulated that the coastal end of the corridor was to be located north of Arica and was to be bordered to the north by the Peruvian-Chilean border and cover the length of the Arica–La Paz railway. The territory ceded to Bolivia was to also include the corresponding territorial sea and exclusive economic zone.

Additional terms included the freedom of use of the waters of the Lauca river for both Chile and Bolivia as this river was to form the new border between both nations and it was also established that the corridor ceded to Bolivia would be permanently demilitarized. Bolivia would also buy all the government installations left by Chile in the corridor at a fair price and the rights of private individuals living in the corridor would be respected by Bolivia. Finally, the territories received by Bolivia would never be ceded to any other nation.

The agreement would be considered to be an adequate, complete and definitive solution" to Bolivia's landlocked condition and Bolivia would correspondingly renounce to any future claims or disputes.

== Failure of the agreement ==
The agreement failed after Peru was informed of the proposal: according to the Treaty of Lima signed between Peru and Chile, Peru renounced in perpetuity to the Arica and Tarapaca departments in favor of Chile and these territories formed the region that Chile was now offering to Bolivia; however, the Treaty of Lima had also established that Chile would never cede any of the territories it received from Peru without Peru's consent.

Before making its decision final however, Peru's foreign minister met with then American Secretary of State Henry Kissinger who started the meeting admitting feeling puzzled but intrigued as he knew nothing of the history of South America, the War of the Pacific and of the Bolivia-Chile dispute (but also expressing eagerness to learn); and after receiving an exhaustive recount of the history of the three nations since the start of the War of the Pacific onwards from the Peruvian foreign minister Miguel Ángel de la Flor, Kissinger stated that the American official position was essentially one of indifference but with the hope a satisfactory solution for all parties would be reached and with both de la Flor and Kissinger agreeing that drawn-out negotiations would be necessary for this to happen. Without any significant opposition from foreign allies or domestic parties, the Peruvian government made its decision to veto the Charaña proposal final and official.

The main Peruvian objection to the accord was that if the corridor became Bolivian then once its corresponding territorial waters became delineated as per standard international law the future Bolivian waters would invade Peruvian ones which would have to be reduced in size; which was unacceptable for Peru especially because the dispute was between two foreign nations and Peru felt it should not be made to lose anything over it. To avoid this the Peruvian government vetoed the Charaña agreement in the form agreed to by Chile and Peru and, while Peru agreed to the establishment of the Bolivian corridor, it did so on the condition that the coastal strip (arguably the entire object of the corridor and its most valuable part) be made into a trinational condominium that would not belong to Bolivia exclusively but to Peru and Chile as well and the three would simultaneously share sovereignty; but this complicated proposal was rejected by both Chile and Bolivia and the Charaña negotiations were abandoned. After this, Banzer again broke diplomatic relations between Bolivia and Chile on March 17, 1982, and they have remained severed to date. Bolivia has also maintained its claim sovereign to access to the sea which Chile has consistently refused to even discuss.

Besides Peru, other foreign nation that also had a stake in the War of the Pacific and the subsequent Atacama dispute was Argentina which followed a pattern of extracting concessions from Chile in exchange for staying neutral during these events. During the Charaña negotiations, Bolivia sought the support of Argentina and Argentina offered some moral support to Bolivia in order to pressure Chile, but without ever committing to any tangible support of any kind, deluding Bolivia into believing they could form an alliance with the Argentinians while also extracting concessions from the Bolivians in exchange for any potential support; however, after Argentina reached its goals and extracted concessions from Chile, it simply stopped supporting and engaging with Bolivia.

It has also been argued that Pinochet might have made the entire proposal simply as a goodwill gesture towards Bolivia since Pinochet was likely aware that the Peruvian consent was necessary for the agreement to proceed and, if that was the case, then he should have also known that the Peruvians would not agree to it; thus making Chile seem willing to reach a solution and fulfill all Bolivian demands (which would be why he went through the trouble of taking the negotiations all the way to an actual accord) without ceding anything in the end and making the agreement flounder due to external factors beyond Chilean control.

== Bibliography ==
- Figueroa Pla, Uldaricio; et al. (Graphics by Paula Fernández) (1 October 2007). Goldin, Celeste; González, Matías; Pita, Massiel (eds.). La Demanda Marítima Boliviana en Los Foros Internacionales (in Spanish) (2nd ed.). Santiago Chile: RIL Editores. ISBN 978-956-284-556-4 – via Google Books.
- Lagos Carmona, Guillermo (1 November 1981) [1966]. Historia de las Fronteras de Chile: Los tratados de límites con Bolivia. Vol. 2 (4th ed.). Santiago, Chile: Editorial Andrés Bello. OCLC 9856424 – via Google Books.
- Lizón, Ramiro Prudencio (1 September 2011). Historia de la negociación de Charaña: La más importante negociación del siglo XX sobre el problema marítimo boliviano. Colección Historia (in Spanish) (1st ed.). La Paz, Bolivia: Plural editores. ISBN 978-99954-1-389-7 – via Google Books.
- Ruiz-Tagle Orrego, Emilio (1 April 1992). Bolivia y Chile: El Conflicto del Pacífico (in Spanish) (1st ed.). Santiago, Chile: Editorial Andrés Bello. ISBN 9789561309548 – via Google Books.
- Rodríguez Elizondo, José (2014). Historia de dos demandas: Perú y Bolivia contra Chile. Mercurio Aguilar (in Spanish) (1st ed.). Santiago, Chile: El Mercurio-Aguilar (Aguilar Chilena de Ediciones S.A.). ISBN 9789563477160. OCLC 980599820.
- Carvajal Prado, Patricio (1994) [1983]. Charaña: un acuerdo entre Chile y Bolivia y el tercero en discordia (in Spanish) (3rd ed.). Valparaíso, Chile: Empresa Editora Arquén. OCLC 32133809.
- Rodríguez Elizondo, José (2009). Goldman, Julián (ed.). De Charaña a La Haya. Chile, entre la aspiración marítima de Bolivia y la demanda marítima de Perú (in Spanish) (1st ed.). Santiago, Chile: La Tercera Ediciones. ISBN 978-956-247-467-2.
