= Casus foederis =

Situation where the terms of an alliance come into play

Casus foederis (or casus fœderis) is derived from the Latin for "case for the alliance". In diplomatic terms, it describes a situation in which the terms of an alliance come into play, such as one nation being attacked by another.

== Historical examples ==
=== War of the Pacific ===
In the War of the Pacific, Bolivia invoked casus foederis to bring Peru into the war after Chile reinvaded Bolivia's coast. In 1879, Chilean armed forces occupied the port city of Antofagasta after Bolivia threatened to confiscate the Chilean Antofagasta Nitrate Company's property. Peru attempted to mediate, but when Bolivia announced that a state of war existed, the situation deteriorated. Bolivia called on Peru to activate their secret mutual defense pact, and Chile demanded for Peru to declare its neutrality immediately. On April 5, Chile declared war on both nations. The following day, Peru responded by acknowledging the casus foederis.

=== World War I ===
In World War I, the treaties between Italy and Austria-Hungary, and Romania, which purportedly required Italy and Romania to come to Austria's aid if Austria was attacked by another nation, were ignored by both Italy and Romania because, as Winston Churchill wrote, "the casus fœderis had not arisen" since the attacks on Austria had not been "unprovoked."

=== NATO ===
Article 5 of the North Atlantic Treaty governs mutual defense in the event of an attack on a member nation. It has been invoked only once, on September 12, 2001, in response to the September 11 attacks in the United States.

== Exceptions ==
Where a political-military alliance pact is lacking, there is no obligation to intervene militarily alongside those asking for help, as the decision depends exclusively on the discretionary choices of foreign policy of the requested State.

== See also ==
- Casus belli
- List of Latin phrases
