= Journal of Latin American Studies =

- Discipline: Latin American studies
- Language: English
- Edited by: Thom Rath; Kate Maclean; Néstor Castañeda; Lia de Mattos Rocha

Publication details
- History: 1969-present
- Publisher: Cambridge University Press
- Frequency: Quarterly

Standard abbreviations
- ISO 4: J. Lat. Am. Stud.

Indexing
- ISSN: 0022-216X (print); 1469-767X (web)
- LCCN: 79008163
- OCLC no.: 01800137

Links
- Journal homepage; Online access; Online archive

The Journal of Latin American Studies, established in 1969, is a peer-reviewed academic journal published by Cambridge University Press. The Institute of the Americas of University College London houses the journal.

== Abstracting and indexing ==
The journal is abstracted and indexed in Geo Abstracts, Current Contents, Social Sciences Citation Index, Arts and Humanities Citation Index, IBZ International Bibliography of Periodical Literature, and MLA Bibliography.
