= José de la Riva-Agüero y Looz-Corswarem =

Peruvian politician and diplomat (1827–1881)

José de la Riva-Agüero y Looz Corswarem
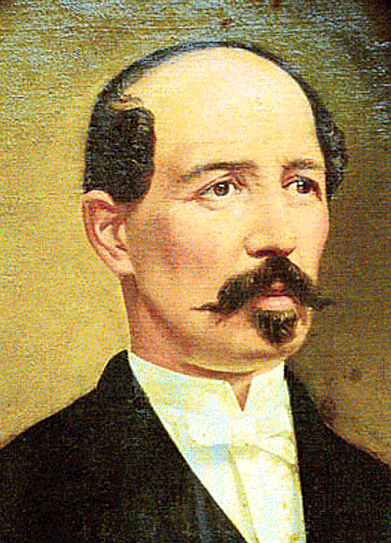

Minister of Foreign Affairs
- In office 7 August 1874 – 3 February 1875
- President: Mariano Herencia Zevallos
- Preceded by: Juan Antonio Ribeyro
- Succeeded by: José Antonio García y García

Finance Minister of Peru
- In office 27 July 1872 – 2 August 1872
- President: Mariano Herencia Zevallos
- Preceded by: Felipe Masías
- Succeeded by: José María de la Jara

Deputy of the Republic of Peru
- In office 1858–1861
- Constituency: Huarochirí District

Personal details
- Born: 25 May 1827 Brussels, Belgium
- Died: 16 August 1881 (aged 54) Lima, Peru
- Party: Civilista Party
- Spouse: Mercedes Riglos y Díaz de Rávago
- Children: Jose Carlos de la Riva-Agüero; Enrique de la Riva-Agüero; Luis de la Riva-Agüero
- Profession: diplomat

José Carlos Fulgencio Pedro Regalado de la Riva-Agüero y Looz Corswarem (Brussels, Belgium, 25 May 1827 – Lima, Peru, 16 August 1881) was a Peruvian politician and diplomat.

He was the son of José de la Riva Agüero, Marquess of Montealegre de Aulestia, first President of Peru, and the Belgian princess Caroline-Arnoldine de Looz-Corswarem.

He studied at the Université de Louvain. In 1858, Riva-Agüero was elected Alternate Deputy of the Congress for Huarochirí and Deputy of the Constituent Congress two years after.

Member of the Civilista Party, was Minister of Finance in 1872, Minister of Foreign Affairs and member of the Senate of Peru. He served as Ambassador to Belgium, as well as to France.

Political offices
Preceded by José Eusebio Sánchez Pedraza	Prime Minister of Peru; 1874-1875	Succeeded by Nicolás Freire de Neira
