= Economy of Peru =

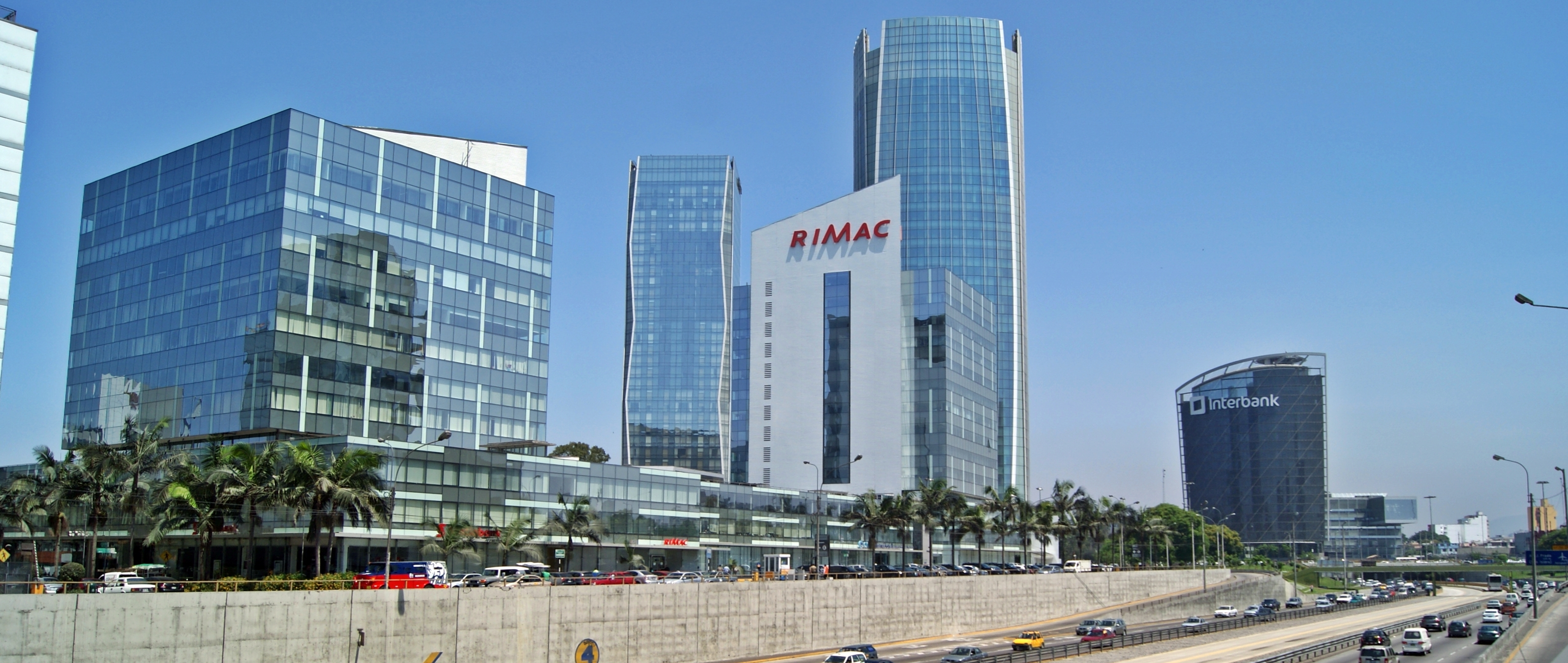
- Lima, the financial center of Peru
- Currency: Peruvian sol (PEN, S/)
- Fiscal year: calendar year
- Trade organizations: CPTPP, APEC, CAN, Pacific Alliance, WTO, Prosur, Mercosur (associate)
- Country group: Developing/Emerging; Upper-middle income economy

Statistics
- Population: ▲33,726,000 (2023 est.)
- GDP: ▲$399.59 billion (nominal; 2026); ▲$703.33 billion (PPP; 2026)
- GDP rank: 44th (nominal; 2026); 45th (PPP; 2026)
- GDP growth: 3.0% (2026); 2.9% (2027); 3.2% (2028)
- GDP per capita: ▲$11,498 (nominal; 2026); ▲$20,238 (PPP; 2026)
- GDP per capita rank: 82nd (nominal; 2026); 99th (PPP; 2026)
- GDP per capita growth: 2.2% (2024)
- GDP by sector: agriculture: 7.6%; industry: 32.7%; services: 59.9%; (2017 est.)
- Inflation (CPI): 1.9% (2024 est.)
- Population below national poverty line: ▼12.7% in multidimensional poverty (2019); ▼36% on less than $8.30/day (2024)
- Gini coefficient: ▼40.1 medium (2024, World Bank)
- Human Development Index: ▲0.794 high (2023) (79th); ▲0.633 medium IHDI (79th) (2023)
- Labor force: ▲18,818,406 (2019); ▼65.5% employment rate (2018)
- Labor force by occupation: agriculture: 27.4%; industry: 15.2%; services: 57.4%; (2019)
- Unemployment: ▲6.9% (2017 est.) note: data are for metropolitan Lima; widespread underemployment; ▼3.6% (2012)
- Main industries: mining; Mineral and jewel processing; steel; metal fabrication; petroleum; natural gas; fishing; fish processing; cement; glass; textiles; clothing; food processing; beer; soft drinks; rubber; machinery; electrical machinery; chemicals; furniture

External
- Exports: ▲$90 billion (2025 est.)
- Export goods: copper, gold, petroleum, zinc, blueberry, cocoa, avocado, grape, fish meal, coffee, asparagus, quinoa
- Main export partners: China 27.6%; United States 16.7%; India 5.2%; South Korea 5.1%; Japan 4.6%; (2018)
- Imports: ▲$60.13 billion (2025)
- Import goods: petroleum oils 15.2%; transmitter equipment 3.3%; automobiles 1.9%; maize 1.6%
- Main import partners: China 23.3%; United States 21.3%; Brazil 5.6%; Mexico 4.5%; Ecuador 4.5%; (2018)
- FDI stock: ▲$98.24 billion (31 December 2017 est.); ▲ Abroad: $5.447 billion (31 December 2017 est.)
- Current account: ▲ −$2.414 billion (2017 est.)
- Gross external debt: ▼$66.25 billion (31 December 2017 est.)

Public finance
- Government debt: ▲25.4% of GDP (2017 est.)
- Foreign reserves: ▲$97.295 billion (Feb. 2026 est.)
- Budget balance: −3.1% (of GDP) (2017 est.)
- Revenue: 58.06 billion (2017 est.)
- Spending: 64.81 billion (2017 est.)
- Economic aid: $27.267 million (2018 est.)
- Credit rating: Standard & Poor's: A- (Domestic); BBB+ (Foreign); A (T&C Assessment); Outlook: Negative; Moody's: Baa1; Outlook: Negative; Fitch: BBB; Outlook: Stable
- All values, unless otherwise stated, are in US dollars.

Peru has an emerging, mixed economy characterized by a high level of foreign trade and an upper middle income economy as classified by the World Bank. It has the forty-seventh largest economy in the world by total GDP and currently experiences a high human development index. The country was one of the world's fastest-growing economies in 2012, with a GDP growth rate of 6.3%. The economy was expected to increase 9.3% in 2021, in a rebound from the COVID-19 pandemic in Peru. Peru has signed a number of free trade agreements with its main trade partners. China became the nation's largest trading partner following the China–Peru Free Trade Agreement signed on 28 April 2009. Additional free trade agreements have been signed with the United States in 2006, Japan in 2011 and the European Union in 2012. Trade and industry are centralized in Lima while agricultural exports have led to regional development within the nation.

Peru's economy is dependent on commodity exports, making it vulnerable to price volatility in international markets. The Government of Peru has historically shown limited involvement in the public sector, as the economy has often relied on commodity booms. The extraction of these commodities has led to conflicts within the country due to their environmental and social impacts.

Following the independence of Peru from the Spanish Empire, the economic elite focused their power on the coastal regions through centralismo, while the rural provinces were governed by existing serfdom practices by hacienda landowners. This model essentially continued until 1968 when General Juan Velasco Alvarado took power, leading a dictatorship that increased social spending and removing the power of landowners, which resulted with a power vacuum in the 1970s that saw the rise of communist guerilla group Shining Path. Beginning in the 1980s, Peru faced economic difficulties as a result of the early 1980s recession and the internal conflict in Peru during its Lost Decade. The government of Alan García enacted price controls that resulted in hyperinflation. In response, the armed forces of Peru drafted Plan Verde, an operation to create a neoliberal, open market economy. This was reportedly executed by the government of Alberto Fujimori, beside prescriptions from economist Hernando de Soto, during a period known as "Fujishock". During this shock, price controls were discontinued, the privatization of state-run organizations occurred and the promotion of foreign investments happened through the removal of regulations. The economic measures of the Fujimori administration made the country macro-economically stable.

Development in Peru increased following the 2000s commodities boom while government finances, poverty reduction and progress in social sectors improved. The nation has more recently adopted the Lima Consensus, an economic ideology of neoliberalism, deregulation and free market policies that has made foreign portfolio investment in Peru attractive. By 2012, inflation in Peru was the lowest in Latin America at 1.8%. A political crisis that has continued since 2016 initiated a period of institutional instability that resulted with unfinished government projects and policies. The continued income from commodities has provided economic stability to Peru, however, though poverty rates increased and did not recover following the COVID-19 pandemic in Peru.

Peruvian economic performance has been tied to exports, which provide hard currency to finance imports and external debt payments, though in recent decades the economy has begun to diversify. Peru's main exports are copper, gold, zinc, textiles, chemicals, pharmaceuticals, manufactures, machinery, services and fish meal. The country's major trade partners are the United States, China, Brazil, the European Union and Chile. Although exports have provided substantial revenue, self-sustained growth and a more egalitarian distribution of income have proven elusive. Services account for 59.9% of Peruvian gross domestic product, followed by industry (32.7%) and agriculture (7.6%). Recent economic growth has been fueled by macroeconomic stability, improved terms of trade, as well as rising investment and consumption.

== History ==
Historic GDP per capita in Peru

=== Inca Empire ===
The Tahuantinsuyo (the Realm of the Four Parts), popularly known as the Inca Empire, was the largest civilization that emerged from the highlands of Peru in the early 13th century. The Spanish conquered the last Inca stronghold in 1572.

The Inca Empire employed central planning. Writing about the Inca tax system, Spanish chronicler Pedro Cieza de León said "the system the Incas employed was so good that the people did not feel it, and prospered ... [A]ll this was accomplished in such orderly fashion that neither did the natives fail to pay what they owed and were assessed, nor did those who collected these tributes venture to take one grain of corn in excess". Officials would travel to cities and provinces where they would be provided quipus storing data, with Inca territories contributing what was possible; whether it be labor (mit'a), textiles, food, weapons or construction materials. Regarding labor, provinces would provide men to be employed by the empire who required to be married so their wives could maintain home life. Citizens were not exposed to overwork as individuals who became ill would be returned and replaced by their home province while many days of a month were dedicated to recreation and feasts.

=== Viceroyalty of Peru ===
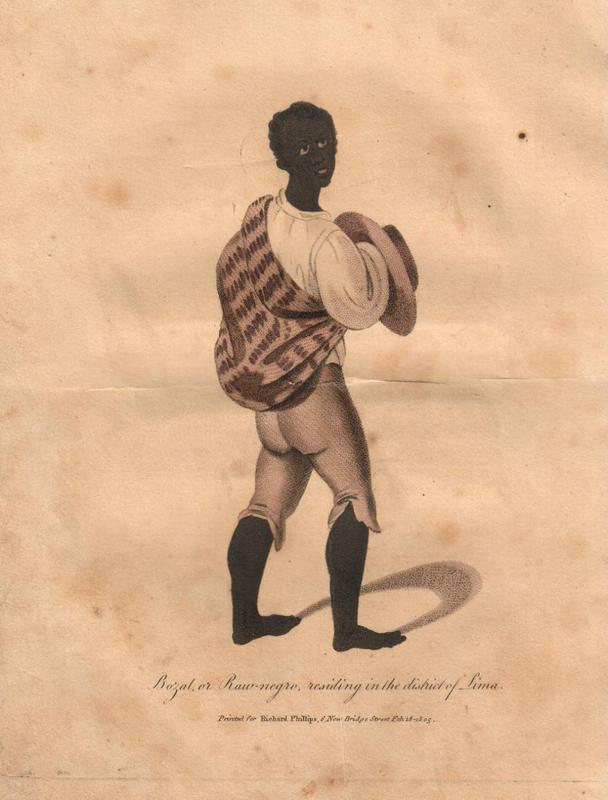
Bozal African in Lima, 1805

The economy of the Viceroyalty of Peru largely depended on the export of silver. The huge amounts of silver exported from the Viceroyalty of Peru and Mexico deeply affected Europe, where some scholars believe it caused the so-called price revolution. Silver mining was carried out using contract and free wage labourers, as well as the encomienda system of slavery. The encomienda has been described as constituting genocide. Under the Spanish system, Cieza de León wrote that "with the disorder and greed of the Spaniards, the number of the people has fallen off to such a degree that most of them have disappeared, and they will be wiped out completely as a result of the covetousness and greed". Afro-Peruvians also appeared as a result of slavery in colonial Spanish America. Silver production peaked in 1610.

Prussian explorer Alexander von Humboldt first encountered guano in 1802 and started fertilizer research Callao in Peru, with his findings being reported throughout Europe.

=== 19th century ===
==== Guano Era ====
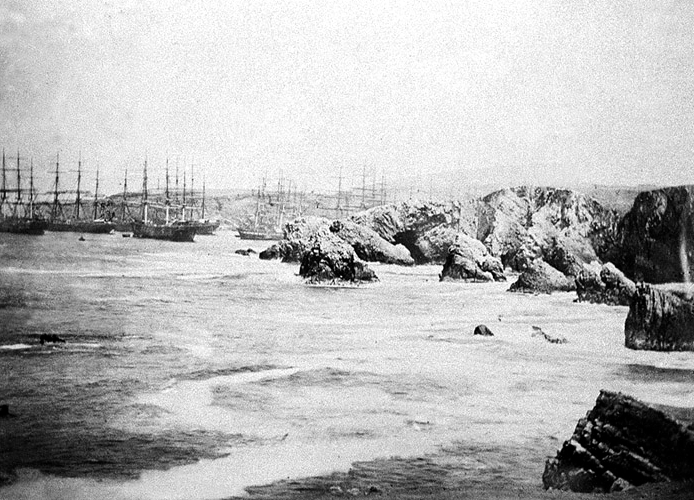
The Chincha Islands, a large source of guano, 1866

After winning independence from Spain on 28 July 1821, Peru was financially strapped. Additionally, the economy suffered from the collapse of the silver mines. However, the guano trade with Europe, beginning in the 1840s, flooded Peru with European investments and money. In 1840, Peruvian politician and entrepreneur Francisco Quirós y Ampudia commercialized guano exports in a deal with French businessmen and the Peruvian government, abolishing existing claims to Peruvian guano. Guano was essentially nationalized and became Peru's largest revenue source. Despite the near exhaustion of guano, Peru achieved its greatest ever export of guano in 1870, with more than 700,000 tonnes (770,000 short tons).

==== War of the Pacific ====
Chile was devastated by the Long Depression economic crisis of the 1870s and began looking for a replacement for its silver, copper and wheat exports. It has been argued that Chile's economic situation and the prospect of new wealth in nitrates were the true reasons for the Chilean elite to go to war against Peru and Bolivia, with most historians agreeing that the Chilean government's expansionist foreign policy and its ambitions to control Atacama's mineral wealth led to the conflict .

Chile won the war and with the Treaty of Ancón of 1884, the War of the Pacific ended. Chile obtained half of Peru's guano income from the 1880s and its guano islands, with Chile taking control over the most valuable nitrogen resources in the world. Chile's national treasury would increase 900% from 1879 to 1902 due to the newly acquired lands. Meanwhile, Peru's reliance on commodity exports – which continued through its history – resulted the bankruptcy of its economy. Peru would go on to approve the Grace Contract, which granted ownership of Peru's railroads to holders of sovereign debt, with the Peruvian government not issuing new sovereign debt until 1906.

=== 20th century ===
==== Amazon rubber boom ====
Into the twentieth century, Anglo-Peruvian Amazon Rubber Co in Iquitos began to market rubber internationally. The rubber boom brought regions of Amazonia into the international market. The Government of Peru ceded to the Anglo-Peruvian Amazon Rubber Co the Amazon territories north of Loreto, after the company's founder Julio César Arana purchased the land. During the rubber boom the Putumayo Genocide was committed by Anglo-Peruvian Amazon Rubber Co. Between 40,000 and 250,000 indigenous peoples were killed, with many being sent to labor camps; ninety percent of the affected Amazonian populations were annihilated.

==== World War I and II eras ====
In the early 1910s, Peru enjoyed a growing economy due to mining and crop production, with a working class developing at the time. Following the outbreak of World War I, international markets became turbulent and Peru experienced a recession and a series of coups occurred through the mid and late-1910s. Augusto B. Leguía, a member of Peru's oligarchy, then took power through a coup and essentially assumed dictatorial powers, writing a new constitution; Leguía would often ignore the constitution through his acts, however. Víctor Raúl Haya de la Torre founded the American Popular Revolutionary Alliance (APRA) calling for reforms, though Leguía quickly banned the party. Leguía increased spending to modernize Peru, though this also raised national debt and with the addition of the Great Depression in 1929, he was overthrown soon-after in 1930 by Luis Miguel Sánchez Cerro.

Sánchez announced a debt moratorium on US$180 million and Peru was banned from markets in the United States as a result. The Sánchez government also continued the repression of APRA, resulting in an Aprista party member assassinating Sánchez. Óscar R. Benavides was chosen by the constituent assembly to finish Sánchez's term and intensified persecution of left-wing groups, resulting in increased support for the Peruvian Communist Party (PCP) among indigenous and labor groups. As Peru's economy grew, a banker in Lima, Manuel Prado Ugarteche, was elected into the presidency in the 1939 Peruvian general election.

President Prado adopted a softer tone on APRA while Aprista leader Haya de la Torre also espoused more moderate policy and support for foreign markets. APRA was made a legal party in 1945 and in José Luis Bustamante y Rivero was elected the same year, making an Aprista politician the Minister of the Economy. Subsequently, the Bustamante greatly increased economic interventionism to include price controls and a foreign exchange controls, which appeared beside a slowing economy, resulting in increased inflation.

==== Military juntas and first Belaúnde government ====
Over the next two decades, military juntas controlled Peru. On 29 October 1948, General Manuel A. Odría led a successful military coup against Bustamante and assumes the presidency until 1956. Odría's government experienced a growing economy due to a commodity boom, though many of the government's investments remained in coastal cities while unrest increased among interior and Andean regions that remained impoverished. Haya de la Torre – whose APRA party had drifted even more to right-wing politics at this time – won the 1962 Peruvian general election against Fernando Belaúnde, founder of the right-wing Popular Action, though Haya de la Torre was unable to take office due to a military coup opposed to APRA.

After a brief military government, Belaúnde won the 1963 Peruvian general election, with his government making modest improvements by increasing industrialization and constructing highways into the Andes. Belaúnde held a doctrine called "The Conquest of Peru by Peruvians", which promoted the exploitation of resources in the Amazon and other outlying areas of Peru through conquest. In one 1964 incident called the Matsé genocide, the Belaúnde administration targeted the Matsés after two loggers were killed, with the Peruvian armed forces and American fighter planes dropping napalm on the indigenous groups armed with bows and arrows, killing hundreds. Belaúnde's economic measures were received with disapproval from rural and peasant Peruvians. His government's reliance on resource exports, especially with the fishing industry, resulted in increased inflation and a growing deficit. Amid this conflict, general Juan Velasco Alvarado overthrows the Belaúnde in the 1968 Peruvian coup d'état .

==== Revolutionary Government of the Armed Forces ====
Velasco established the Revolutionary Government of the Armed Forces and it adopted a state capitalism economic policy amid a period of economic expansion. The government immediately instituted land reform initiatives, establishing one of the most ambitious land tenure projects in the history of Latin America. The land reform projects removed the traditional hacienda system that resembled landowners imposing a serfdom on peasants and replaced it with agricultural cooperatives called Agricultural Social-Interest Societies (SAIS). The Velasco government took a structural approach; it invested in infrastructure and began a widespread nationalization campaign of key economic production sectors, education and the media. A fixed exchange rate system was adopted and the national debt began to increase dramatically. A combination of debt, inflation and the 1973 oil crisis induced an economic crisis in the Velasco government, with General Francisco Morales-Bermúdez overthrowing Velasco in the Tacnazo.

Bermúdez in name led the Second Revolutionary Government of the Armed Forces, with his government introducing austerity measures and removing state capitalist systems. This government began monetary adjustment and started with negotiations on foreign debt. However, corruption scandals and widespread protests broke out and the military government agreed to transition Peru back into a democratic political system.

==== The Lost Decade ====
In 1980, after twelve years of military rule, Fernando Belaúnde Terry was elected president for a second time. On the day of the election, Shining Path launched its armed struggle in Chuschi with a ballot burning incident, essentially beginning the internal conflict in Peru. Belaúnde's used a floating exchange rate and used populist policies, primarily relying on key exports. His government continued to reverse Velasco's existing policies and some economic liberalization. However, Belaúnde's government could not develop a monetary policy, failed at managing state-run entities and faced a growing external debt, leaving Peru in a vulnerable state.

Alan García was elected president in the 1985 Peruvian general election and the first Aprista president in over sixty years. His administration adopted a neo-structuralist economic policy, with the government funding the private sector to enhance economic performance, increasing welfare spending and instituting price controls; this resulted with temporary economic growth, though Peru's national debt grew dramatically. By 1989, inflation reached almost 3,000 percent and 7,000 percent in 1990, with Peru experiencing a GDP loss of twenty-four percent in the last three years of García's tenure. With the growing economic crisis and the terrorist Shining Path gaining territory in an armed conflict with the Peruvian government, the idea of a leader with a "heavy hand" became more attractive to Peruvians according to Gutiérrez Sanín and Schönwälder.

The Peruvian armed forces grew frustrated with the inability of the García administration to handle the nation's crises and began to draft a plan to overthrow his government. According to Peruvian sociologist and political analyst Fernando Rospigliosi, Peru's business elites held relationships with the military planners, with Rospigliosi writing that businesses "probably provided the economic ideas which [the military] agreed with, the necessity of a liberal economic program as well as the installment of an authoritarian government which would impose order". Thus, Plan Verde was drafted at the end of the García presidency; the objectives evolved into establishing a civilian-military government with a neoliberal economic policy.

==== Fujimori government ====
During his campaigning for the 1990 election, Alberto Fujimori expressed concern against the proposed neoliberal policies of his opponent Mario Vargas Llosa. Peruvian magazine Oiga reported that following the election, the armed forces were unsure of Fujimori's willingness to fulfill their objectives outlined in Plan Verde and it was reported that the meeting held a negotiatory meeting with him to ensure that Fujimori followed their direction. After taking office, Fujimori abandoned the economic platform he promoted during his campaign, adopting more aggressive neoliberal policies than those espoused by Vargas Llosa, his competitor in the election. Fujimori would go on to adopt many of the policies outlined in Plan Verde. Fujimori ultimately served as president from 28 July 1990 to 17 November 2000.

Fujimori is often credited with defeating the Shining Path terrorist group in Peru and restoring its macroeconomic stability. Fujimori's economic policy was largely adopted from the advice of Peruvian economist Hernando de Soto, who prescribed economic guidelines – including the loosening of economic regulation, the introduction of austerity measures and the use of neoliberal policies – that were ultimately adopted by the Fujimori administration and established in the 1993 Constitution of Peru. Although economic statistics show improved economic data in Peru in recent decades, the wealth earned between 1990 and 2020 was not distributed throughout the country; living standards showed disparities between the more-developed capital city of Lima and similar coastal regions while rural provinces remained impoverished.

=== 21st century ===
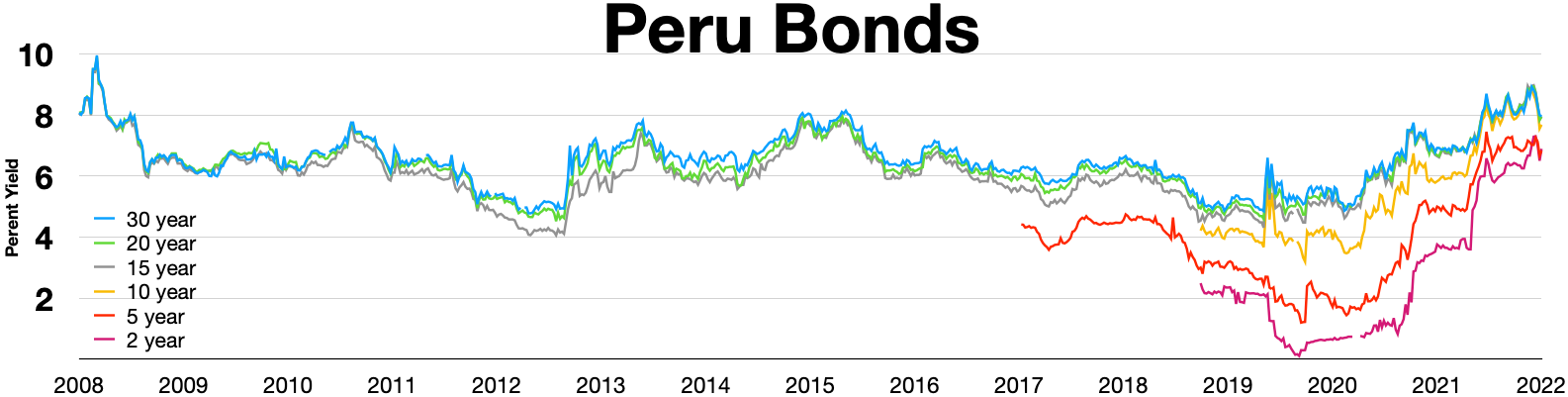
Peru bonds 30 year 20 year 15 year 10 year 5 year 2 year

==== Lima Consensus ====
Initially established by the Fujimori administration, the Lima Consensus focused on deregulation and privatization with the goal of establishing a neoliberal economy, all while limiting the involvement of the government in the public sector. As the Washington Consensus lost popularity in the 2000s, a more defined Lima Consensus began to emerge in Peru as the economy simultaneously improved during the 2000s commodities boom. While Latin American governments invested into social programs for education, healthcare and poverty programs in the early 21st century, Peru under the Consensus chose to cut social programs. President Alejandro Toledo continued to promote the decentralization of Peru, while the former social democrat Alan García took implementation of the consensus even further, adopting policies similar to Augusto Pinochet.

Keiko Fujimori, the daughter of Alberto Fujimori, has been a major proponent for the Lima Consensus. This lack of state intervention as promoted by the Consensus has resulted with a weak government with poor performance, with many Peruvians experiencing insufficient basic services such as education, justice and security while corruption, crime, crony capitalism and economic inequality increased as many political officials frequently moving between business and government positions without oversight. About half of all governmental projects initiated between 2012 and 2026 were left unfinished. The Peruvian political crisis worsened Peru's economic standing as instability of governmental positions resulted with inconsistent policies. Following the COVID-19 pandemic in Peru, when other nations were able to decrease poverty rates, Peru's number of impoverished did not improve.

== Sectors ==
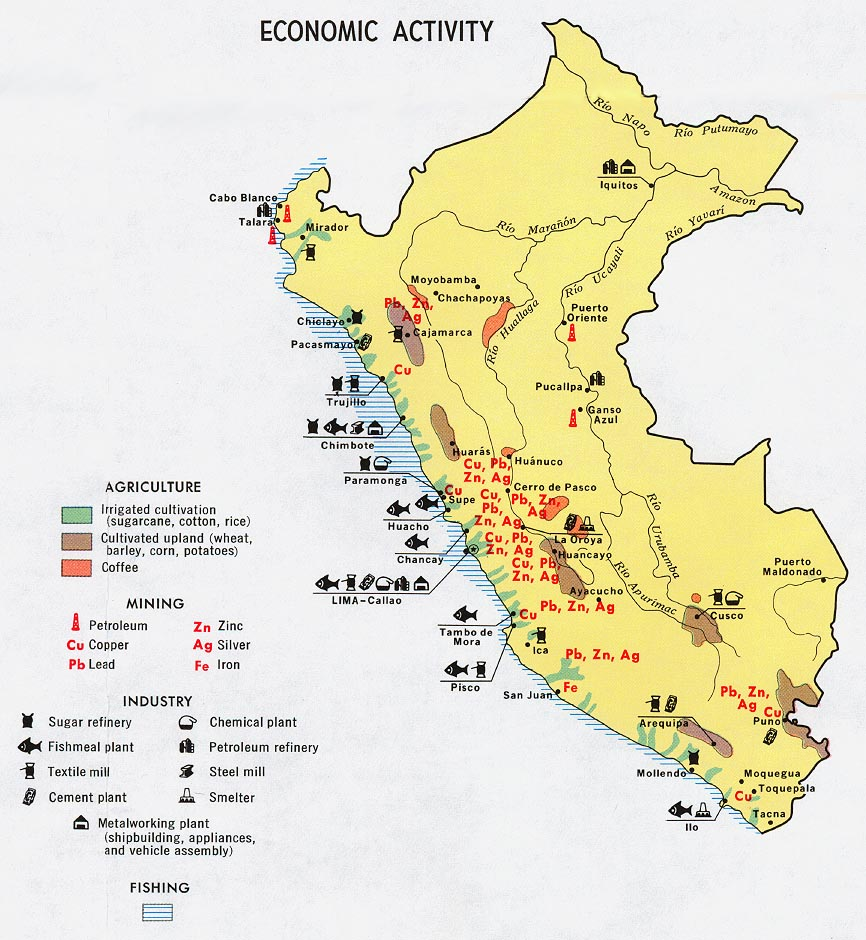
Peru's economic activity in the 1970s

=== Agriculture ===
Peru is a country with many climates and geographical zones that make it an important agricultural nation. Peruvian agricultural exports include artichokes, grapes, avocados, mangoes, peppers, sugarcane, organic coffee and premium-quality cotton.

Peru is one of the 5 largest producers of avocado, blueberry, artichoke and asparagus, one of the 10 largest producers in the world of coffee and cocoa, one of the 15 largest producers in the world of potato and pineapple, and also has a considerable production of grape, sugarcane, rice, banana, maize and cassava; its agriculture is considerably diversified.

In 2018, Peru produced 10.3 million tons of sugarcane, 5.1 million tons of potato, 3.5 million tons of rice, 2.2 million tons of banana, 1.5 million tons of maize, 1.2 million tons of cassava, 921 thousand tons of palm oil, 645 thousand tons of grape, 548 thousand tons of pineapple, 504 thousand tons of avocado, 481 thousand tons of tangerine, 502 thousand tons of orange, 369 thousand tons of coffee, 383 thousand tons of mango, 360 thousand tons of asparagus, 270 thousand tons of lemon, 252 thousand tons of tomato, 207 thousand tons of barley, 195 thousand tons of wheat, 188 thousand tons of olives, 187 thousand tons of carrots, 175 thousand tons of papaya, 175 thousand tons of pepper, 154 thousand tons of artichoke, 140 thousand tons of apple, 134 thousand tons of cocoa, in addition to smaller productions of other agricultural products.

=== Fishing and aquaculture ===
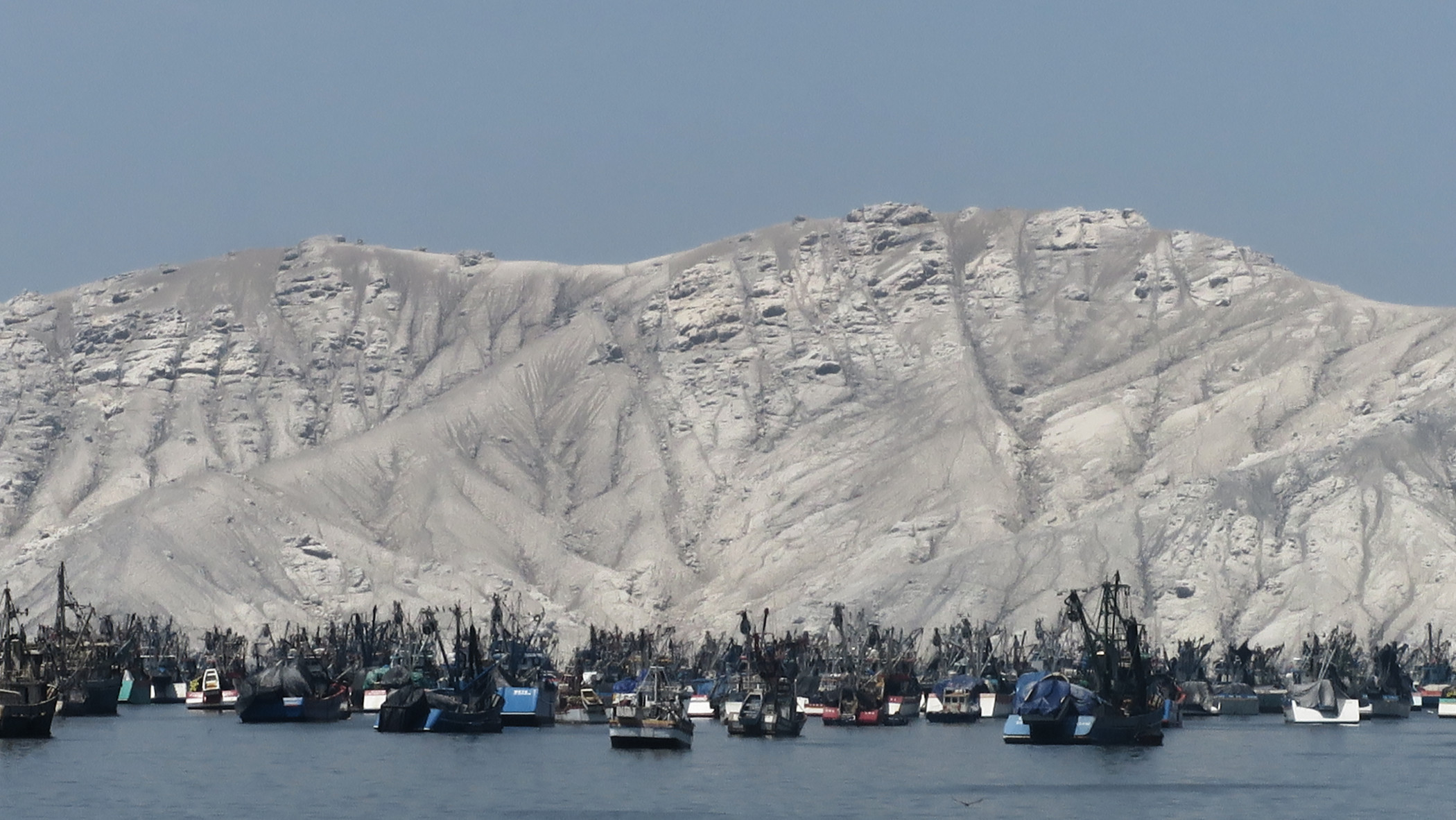
Fishing fleet in Ferrol Bay near Chimbote. In the middle of the 20th century, its port became the one with the largest fishing production on the planet.

Fishing is a major economic activity in Peru. As of 2022, Peru has the third-largest fishery, accounting for about 6.6% of the global marine species catch in 2022. The main target species is the Peruvian anchoveta, which accounted for about 86.7% of marine landings in 2022. The Peruvian anchoveta is primarily used for fishmeal and fish oil production, of which Peru is the world's largest producer of, typically accounting for between one-fourth and one-third of global trade of fishmeal and fish oil. Aquaculture has also progressed significantly since 2000, growing from a production value of about 6,500 tonnes to nearly 141,000 tonnes in 2022. According to Peru's Ministry of Production, the sector exported about US$2.9 billion worth of product in 2023, employing about 90,900 people across inland fisheries, marine fisheries, and aquaculture.

=== Industry ===
Peru's natural resources are copper, silver, gold, timber, fish, iron ore, coal, phosphate, potash, and natural gas.

==== Mining ====
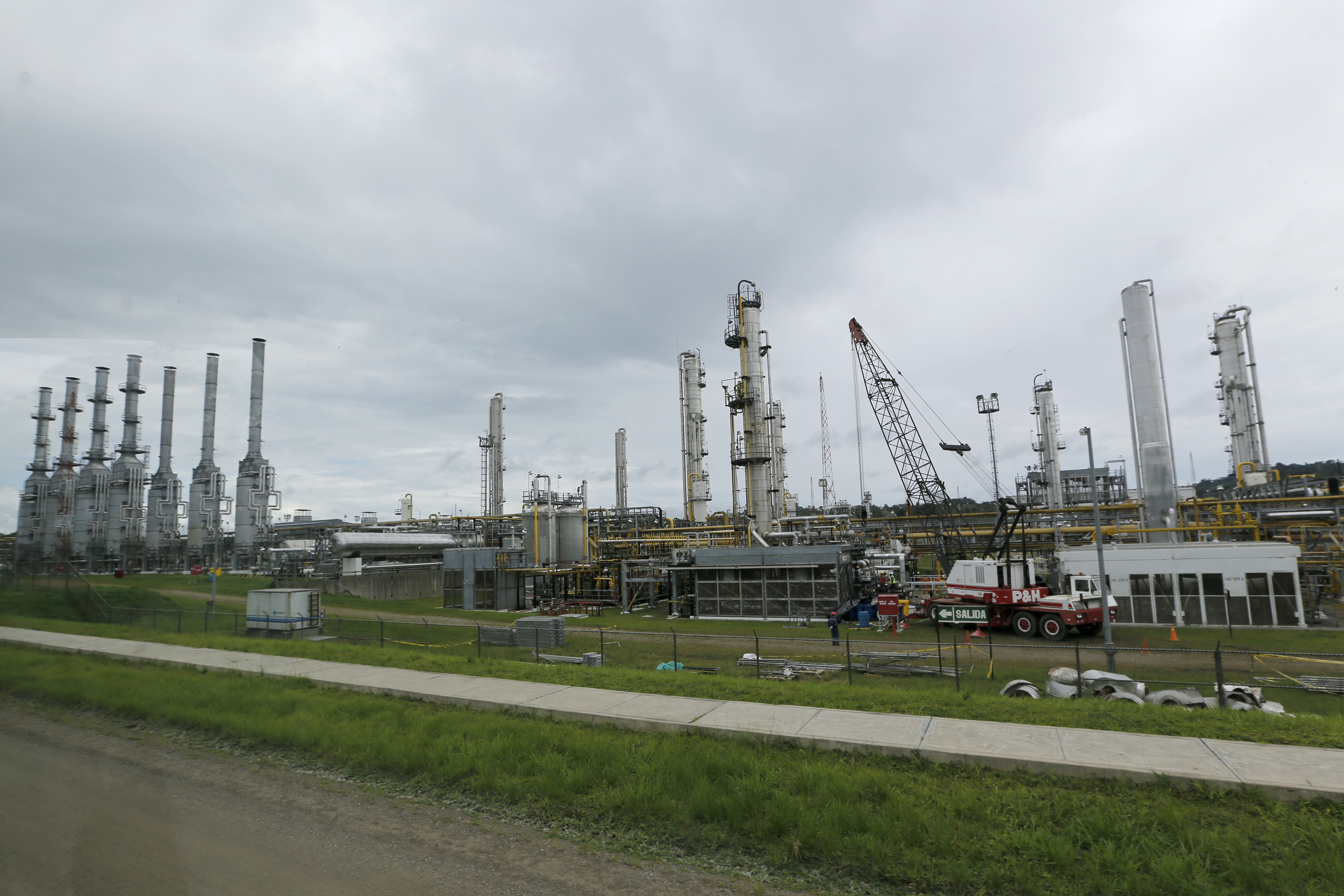
Natural gas separation plant of the Camisea Gas Project in La Convención Province, Cuzco.

Mining is a major pillar of the Peruvian economy. In 2019, the country was the 2nd largest world producer of copper and silver, 8th largest world producer of gold, 3rd largest world producer of lead, 2nd largest world producer of zinc, 4th largest world producer of tin, 5th largest world producer of boron and 4th largest world producer of molybdenum. The country was once the world's largest producer of silver and was also one of the five largest gold producers in the world.

Illegal mining remains a significant problem in Peru with its associated deforestation, pollution, prostitution, poor working conditions and criminality.

==== Manufacturing ====
Peru has developed a medium manufacturing sector. The sector now represents 23 percent of GDP and is tied heavily to mining, fishing, agriculture, construction and textiles. Manufacturing is mainly devoted to processing to gain a value-added advantage. The most promising sector is textiles, metal mechanics, food industry, agricultural industry, manufactures, chemicals, pharmaceuticals, machinery and services.

==== Energy ====
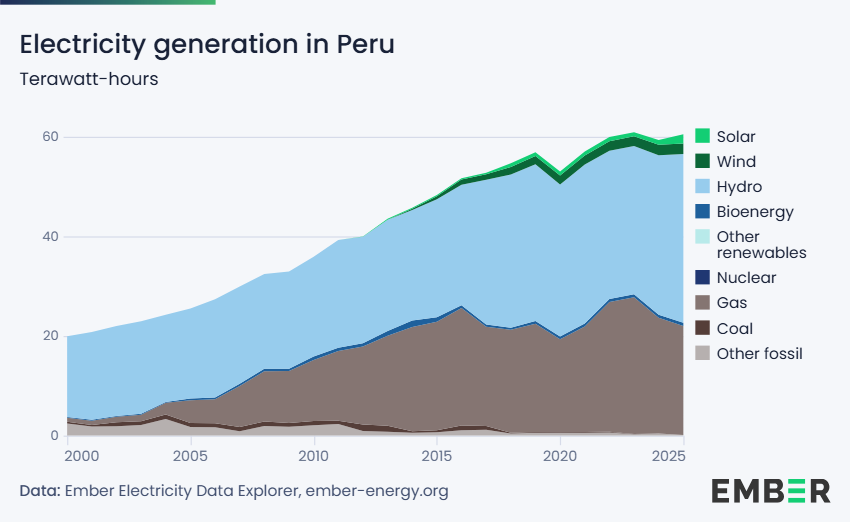
Electricity generation in Peru in terawatt-hours

The electricity sector in Peru has experienced large improvements in the past 15 years. Access to electricity has increased from 45% in 1990 to 96.4% in 2018, while service quality and efficiency of service provision improved. These improvements were made possible through privatizations following reforms initiated in 1992. At the same time, electricity tariffs have remained in line with the average for Latin America.

However, several challenges remain. Chief among them are the still very low level of access in rural areas and the untapped potential of some renewable energies, in particular wind and solar energy, due to an inadequate regulatory framework.

The current electricity generation capacity is evenly divided between thermal and hydroelectric sources. A renewed recent dynamism of the electricity sector in the country is based on the shift to natural gas plants, which will be mainly fed from the production of the Camisea gas field in the Amazon rainforest.

The National Interconnected System (SEIN) serves 85% of the connected population, with several “isolated” systems covering the rest of the country. While investment in generation, transmission and distribution in urban areas is predominantly private, resources for rural electrification come solely from public sources.

=== Services ===
==== Education ====
Education in Peru is under the jurisdiction of the Ministry of Education, which oversees formulating, implementing and supervising the national educational policy. According to the Constitution of Peru, education is compulsory and free in public schools for the initial, primary and secondary levels. It is also free in public universities for students who are unable to pay tuition and have an adequate academic performance.

Throughout Peru's history, the nation's educational structure and quality has remained poor. Elites who organized the educational system promoted conservatism and authoritarianism while also defending a social hierarchy that prevented a social mobility that would improve the lives of citizens. The ineffectiveness of regulation, corruption and the government's lack of interest in improvements has contributed to the low quality of Peru's educational structure. Peru's lack of higher education accreditation and its reliance on extractivism – with mining not requiring much scientific support – has also been detrimental to universities and research facilities within the nation. Congress has recently weakened the accreditation standards at universities further.

The Human Rights Measurement Initiative (HRMI) finds that Peru is fulfilling 90.5% of what it should be fulfilling for the right to education based on the country's level of income. HRMI breaks down the right to education by looking at the rights to both primary education and secondary education. While taking into consideration Peru's income level, the nation is achieving 89.3% of what should be possible based on its resources (income) for primary education and 91.6% for secondary education.

==== Healthcare ====
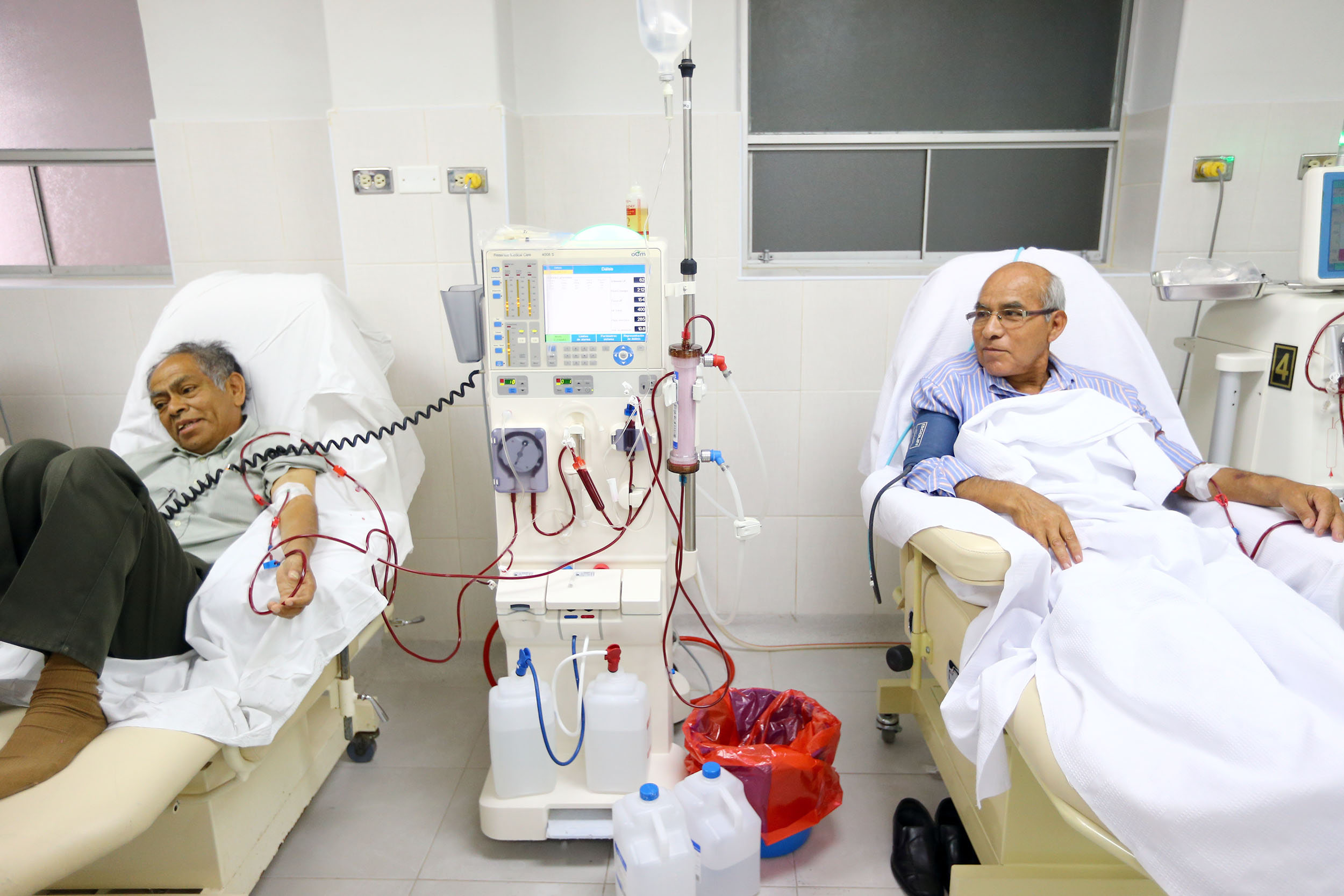
Two Patients at the Peruvian Naval Hospital

Peru has a decentralized healthcare system that consists of a combination of governmental and non-governmental coverage. Five sectors administer healthcare in Peru today: the Ministry of Health (60% of population), EsSalud (30% of population), and the Armed Forces (FFAA), National Police (PNP), and the private sector (10% of population).

==== Telecommunications ====
Telecommunications in Peru include radio and television, fixed and mobile telephones, and the Internet.

==== Tourism ====
Tourism has represented a new growth industry in Peru since the early 1990s, with the government and private sector dedicating considerable energies to boosting the country's tourist destinations both to Peruvians and foreigners.

=== Transport ===
This article describes the transport in Peru.

==== Water supply and sanitation ====

The water and sanitation sector in Peru has made important advances in the last two decades, including the increase of water coverage from 30% to 85% between 1980 and 2010. Sanitation coverage has also increased from 9% to 37% from 1985 to 2010 in rural areas. Advances have also been achieved concerning the disinfection of drinking water and in sewage treatment. Nevertheless, many challenges remain, such as:

- Insufficient service coverage;
- Poor service quality which puts the population's health at risk;
- Deficient sustainability of built systems;
- Tariffs that do not cover the investment and operational costs, as well as the maintenance of services;
- Institutional and financial weakness; and,
- Excess of human resources, poorly qualified, and high staff turnover.

== External trade and investment ==
Exports of Peru by product category (2019) Chemical products Transportation Machines Mineral products Plastics and rubbers Metals Foodstuffs Precious metals Textiles Instruments Animal products Vegetable products Paper goods Footwear and headwear Miscellaneous Stone and glass Wood products Animal and vegetable bi-products Animal hides Arts and antiques Weapons

=== Foreign investment and balance of payments ===
==== Foreign trade and balance of payments ====
In 2001 the current account deficit dropped to about 2.2% of GDP (US$1.17 billion)--from 3.1% in 2000—while the trade balance registered a small deficit. Exports dropped slightly to $7.11 billion, while imports fell 2.1% to $7.20 billion. After being hit hard by El Niño in 1998, fisheries exports have recovered, and minerals and metals exports recorded large gains in 2001 and 2002, mostly as a result of the opening of the Antamina copper-zinc mine. By mid-2002, most sectors of the economy were showing gains. After several years of substantial growth, foreign direct investment not related to privatization fell dramatically in 2000 and 2001, as well as in the first half of 2002. Net international reserves at the end of May 2002 stood at $9.16 billion, up from $8.6 billion (2001), $17 billion at the end of 2006, over $20 billion in 2007, and over $35 billion in May 2008. Peru has signed a number of free trade agreements, including the 2007 United States-Peru Trade Promotion Agreement, and agreements with Chile, Canada, Singapore, Thailand and China. Under President Alan Garcia administration Peru achieved a bilateral trade agreement with U.S. since 2010 to improve exports for its country and reach in August 2011 its pick in exports of more than 4,700 MM.

==== Foreign investment ====
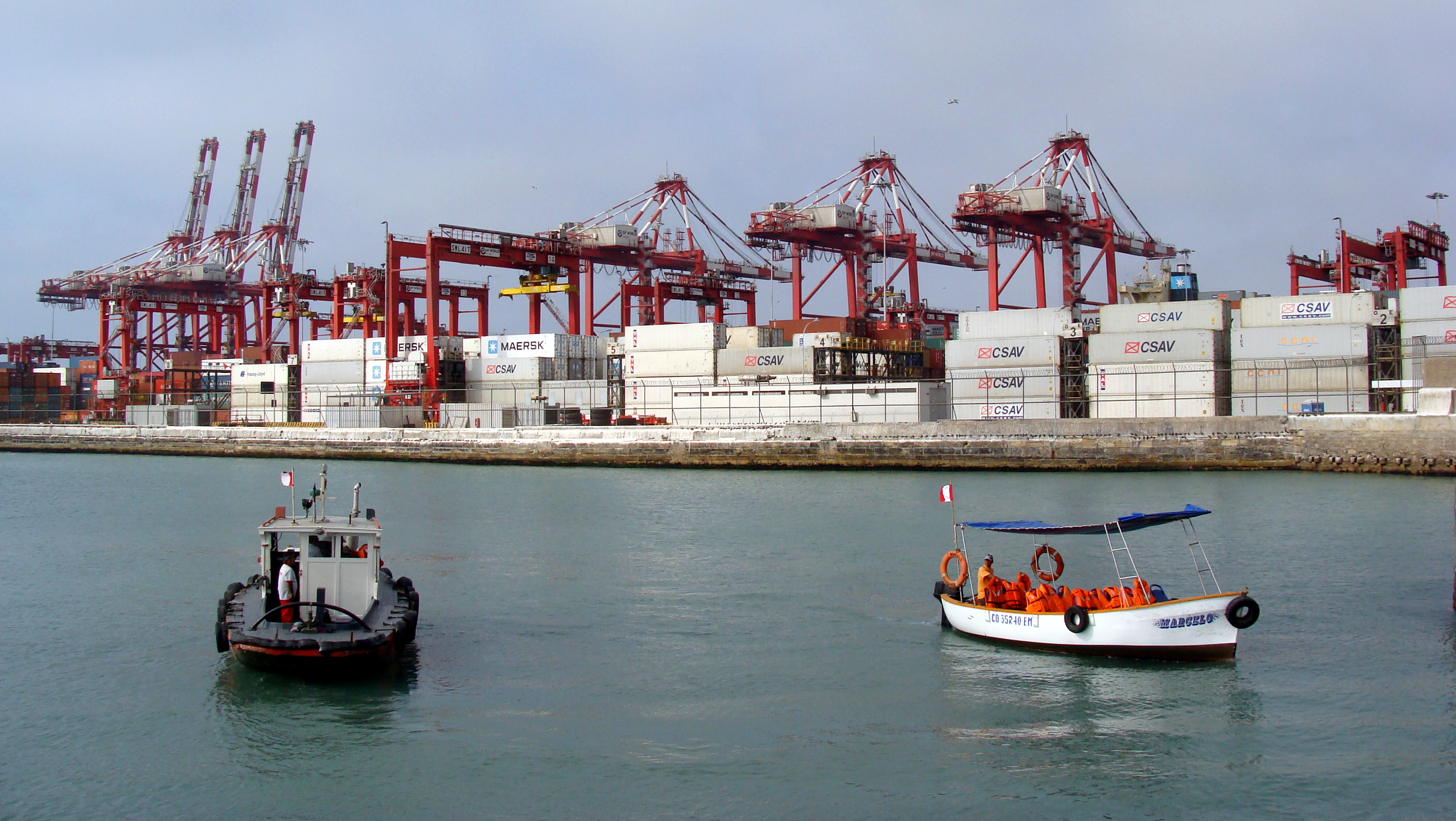
The Port of Callao is Peru's gateway for exports and imports

The Peruvian government actively seeks to attract both foreign and domestic investment in all sectors of the economy. International investment was spurred by the significant progress Peru made during the 1990s toward economic, social, and political stability, but it slowed again after the government delayed privatizations and as political uncertainty increased in 2000. President Alejandro Toledo made investment promotion a priority of his government. While Peru was previously marked by terrorism, hyperinflation, and government intervention in the economy, the Government of Peru under former President Alberto Fujimori took the steps necessary to bring those problems under control. Democratic institutions, however, and especially the judiciary, remain weak.

The Government of Peru's economic stabilization and liberalization program lowered trade barriers, eliminated restrictions on capital flows, and opened the economy to foreign investment, with the result that Peru now has one of the most open investment regimes in the world. Between 1992 and 2001, Peru attracted almost $17 billion in foreign direct investment, after negligible investment until 1991, mainly from Spain (32.35%), the United States (17.51%), Switzerland (6.99%), Chile (6.63%), and Mexico (5.53%). The basic legal structure for foreign investment in Peru is formed by the 1993 constitution, the Private Investment Growth Law, and the November 1996 Investment Promotion Law. Although Peru does not have a bilateral investment treaty with the United States, it has signed an agreement (1993) with the Overseas Private Investment Corporation (OPIC) concerning OPIC-financed loans, guarantees, and investments. Peru also has committed itself to arbitration of investment disputes under the auspices of ICSID (the World Bank'sInternational Center for the Settlement of Investment Disputes) or other international or national arbitration tribunals. In comparison with China and Vietnam, however, Peru has been described as less foreign business friendly.

=== Trade agreements ===
According to the Ministry of Foreign Trade and Tourism, Peru decided to negotiate trade agreements to consolidate the access of Peruvian exports to its most important markets by giving them permanent benefits unlimited in time and coverage as opposed to temporary commercial preferences given unilaterally by certain countries; a system that did not allow Peruvian exporters embark in long-term export-related investments.

Economic Complementation Agreement

- Integration Agreement with Andean Community of Nations: Bolivia, Ecuador and Colombia (signed and effective 1969)
- ACE 50 with Cuba (signed October 2000 and effective 2001)
- ACE 58 with Mercosur (signed August 2003 and effective November 2005)
FTA (Free Trade Agreement) currently in force
- FTA with United States (signed April 2006 and effective February 2009).
- FTA with Chile (signed August 2006 and effective March 2009)
- FTA with Canada(CPFTA) (signed May 2008 and effective August 2009)
- FTA with Singapore (signed May 2008 and effective August 2009)
- FTA with China (signed April 2009 and effective March 2010)
- FTA with South Korea (signed March 2011 and effective August 2011)
- Partial FTA with Thailand (last protocol signed November 2010 and effective December 2011)
- FTA with Mexico (signed April 2011 and effective February 2012)
- FTA with Japan (signed May 2011 and effective March 2012)
- FTA with Panama (signed May 2011 and effective May 2012)
- FTA with EFTA Switzerland, Liechtenstein, Iceland and Norway (signed July 2010, Switzerland and Liechtenstein effective July 2011, Iceland effective October 2011, Norway effective July 2012)
- FTA with European Union (signed April 2011 and effective February 2013)
- FTA with Costa Rica (signed May 2011 and effective June 2013)
- Partial FTA with Venezuela (signed January 2012 and effective August 2013)
- FTA with Pacific Alliance (signed February 2014 and effective May 2016)
- FTA with Honduras (signed May 2015 and effective January 2017)
FTA (Free Trade Agreement) concluded
- Guatemala (signed December 2011)
- Brazil (signed April 2016)
- Australia (signed February 2018)
- CPTPP (signed March 2018)
FTA (Free Trade Agreement) in negotiation
- El Salvador
- India
- Turkey

==== Peru – United States Trade Promotion Agreement ====
The United States – Peru Trade Promotion Agreement (Spanish: Tratado de Libre Comercio Perú – Estados Unidos) is a bilateral free trade agreement, whose objectives are eliminating obstacles to trade, consolidating access to goods and services and fostering private investment in and between the United States and Peru. Besides commercial issues, it incorporates economic, institutional, intellectual property, labor and environmental policies, among others. The agreement was signed on 12 April 2006; ratified by the Peruvian Congress on 28 June 2006; by the U.S. House of Representatives on 2 November 2007 and by the U.S. Senate on 4 December 2007. The agreement was implemented on 1 February 2009.

Peru looks to the agreement are to:

- Consolidate and extend the trade preferences under ATPDEA
- Attract foreign investment
- Generate employment
- Enhance the country's competitiveness within the region
- Increase workers' income
- Curb poverty levels
- Create and export sugar cane ethanol

The United States looks to the agreement to:

- Improve access to goods and services
- Strengthen its investments
- Promote security and democracy
- Fight against drug trafficking

The U.S.-Peru agreement has faced criticism. In Peru, the treaty was championed by Toledo, and supported to different extents by former President Alan García and candidates Lourdes Flores and Valentín Paniagua. Ollanta Humala has been its most vocal critic. Humala's Union for Peru won 45 of 120 seats in Congress in 2006, the largest share by a single party, prompting debate on ratification of the agreement before the new legislature was sworn in. Some Congressmen-elect interrupted the debate after forcibly entering Congress in an attempt to stop the agreement ratification.

One controversial element of the agreement relates to land resources. Laura Carlsen, of the Center for International Policy, who is also a contributor to Foreign Policy in Focus notes that "Indigenous organizations warn that this ruling effectively opens up 45 million hectares to foreign investment and timber, oil, and mining exploitation."

However, most of the criticism of the agreement has focused on its potential impact on Peru's agricultural sector. By planting crops to similar to those subsidized by the U.S., Peru faced a competitive disadvantage in the production of agricultural products because poor farming families with inadequate tools, technology and techniques may not be able to produce crops at low enough prices to export. In response to these concerns, Peruvian lawmakers created a Compensation Fund which directed $34 million per year to cotton, maize/corn, and wheat producers for a five-year period to help them adjust to the new competitive pressures.

Toledo is therefore a market-oriented politician who continued to globalize Peru's economy and is rumored to be getting ready for another run for president. Toledo says bluntly that unless the poorest in the country are better educated, better paid, housed, and fed, the Peruvian economic miracle will stall.

== Currency ==
The sol is the currency of Peru. The exchange rate as of January 2025 is 3.76 soles to the US dollar. It was instated in 1991, when the Peruvian government abandoned the inti due to hyperinflation of the currency; the sol has since maintained the lowest inflation rate in Latin America. The sol replaced the inti at a rate of 1 nuevo sol = 1,000,000 intis. The inti itself replaced another inflated currency, the sol, which was used between 1863 and 1985. The name sol comes from the Latin solidus, and is also the Spanish word for "sun", which the ancient Inca civilization worshiped as the god Inti.

The sol currently enjoys a low inflation rate of 2.5%. Since it was put into use, the sol's exchange rate with the United States dollar has stayed mostly between 2.80 and 3.30 to 1. Out of all the currencies of the Latin American region, the sol is the most stable and reliable, being the least affected by the downturn in the value of the US dollar; during late 2007 and early 2008, the exchange rate fell to 2.69 to 1, which had not been seen since 1997. The exchange rate is set on a daily basis by the Banco Central de Reserva del Perú (Central Reserve Bank of Peru).

The sol is divided into 100 céntimos. The highest-denomination banknote is the 200 soles note; the lowest-denomination coin is the rarely used 5 céntimos coin.

== Income and consumption ==
Peru divides its population into five socio-economic classes, A-E, with A representing the rich; B, the upper middle class; C, the middle class; D, the working class and low income families; and E, the marginalized poor. In 2018, the segments were described as "crude" by Miguel Planas of the Ministry of Finance due to the complicated structure of the society in Peru, where some classes make money off of illegal trade which aren't counted in the GDP, and are thus falsely classified as low income or marginalised poor families.

== Employment ==
Unemployment in Greater Lima is 5.6%, while for the rest of Peru is 7%. FY 2012–2013 In the last report, the number of workers by participants belonging to the public sector amounted to 1.45 million.

== Economic trends ==
=== Greater depth ===
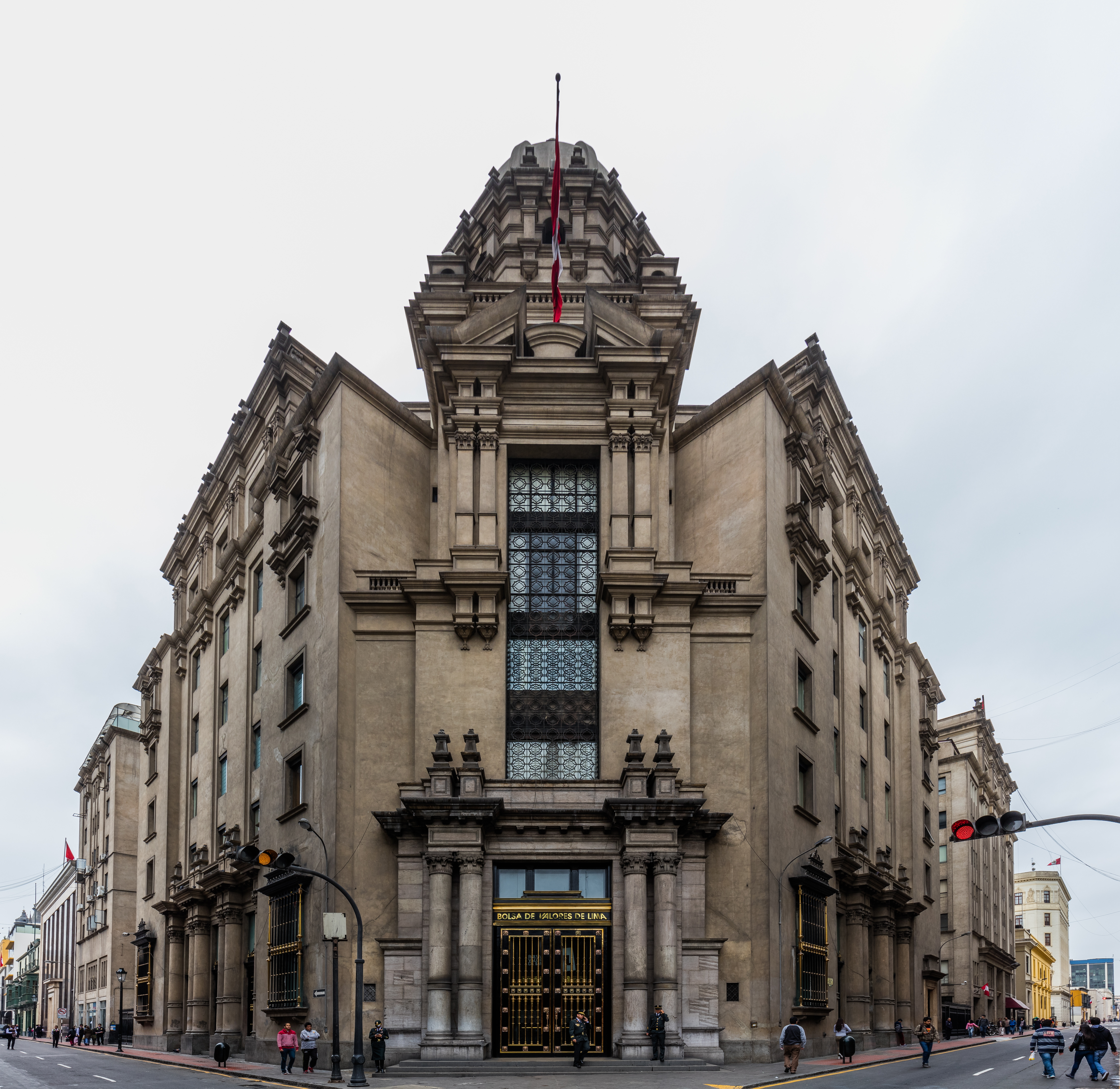
The Lima Stock Exchange

From 1994 through 1998, under the government of Alberto Fujimori, the economy recorded robust growth driven by foreign direct investment, almost 46% of which was related to the privatization program. The government invested heavily on the country's infrastructure, which became a solid foundation for the future of the Peruvian economy. The economy stagnated from 1998 through 2001, the result of the century's strongest El Niño weather phenomenon, global financial turmoil, political instability, a stalled privatization program, increased government intervention in markets, and worsening terms of trade. President Alejandro Toledo implemented a recovery program after taking office, maintained largely orthodox economic policies, and took measures to attract investment, including restarting the privatization program. Nonetheless, political uncertainty led to GDP growth of 0.2% in 2001. The Lima Stock Exchange general index fell 34.5% in 2000 and 0.2% in 2001. Inflation remained at record lows, registering 3.7% in 2000.

The year 2001 saw deflation of 0.1%. The government's overall budget deficit rose sharply in 1999 and 2000 to 3.2% of GDP, the result of hikes in government salaries, expenditures related to the 2000 election campaign, higher foreign debt service payments, and lower tax revenues. The government brought the deficit down to 2.5% of GDP in 2001, and set a target of 1.9% of GDP for 2002. Peru's stability brought about a substantial reduction in underemployment, from an average of 74% from the late 1980s through 1994 to 43% in the 1995–96 period, but the rates began climbing again in 1997–2002 to over half the working population. The poverty rate remained at 54% in 2001, with 24% of Peruvians living in extreme poverty. In 2005, 18% of Peruvians were living in extreme poverty and a poverty rate at 39%. As of 2010, around 30% of its total population is poor.

=== Outlook ===
Forecasts for the medium and long-term remain highly positive. Peru's real GDP growth in 2007 was (8.3%) and largest in Latin America in 2008 was an outstanding 9.8%, the highest in the world. Inflation remained low, at about 3%, while the budget surplus is expected to remain at about 1% of GDP. Private investment should keep growing at a rate of 15% a year. Exports and imports are expected to keep rising. The unemployment and underemployment indexes (5.2% and 34%, respectively, in Lima) should keep coming down as the economy grows, other cities in Peru like Cajamarca, Ica, Cuzco and Trujillo are starting to show less unemployment nowadays. The country is likely to attract future domestic and foreign investment in tourism, agriculture, mining, petroleum and natural gas, power industries and financial institutions. According to the IMF and the World Bank, Peruvian GDP economic growth between 2007 and 2013 was:

In 2007 at 8.9%, in 2008 at 9.7%, in 2009 at 0.9%, in 2010 at 8.6%, in 2011 at 6.0%, in 2012 at 6,3% and in 2013 at 5.3%.

Therefore, Peruvian GDP grew in the 2007–2013 6 years period an outstanding net growth of 45.7% or a 7.61% yearly average. The IMF forecast for Peru's economic growth for the next 6 years 2013–2019 is a 7% yearly growth.

In FY 2011 for the first time since 1991 the size of the Peruvian economy surpassed the Chilean economy. Peru now is the fifth major economy in South America and is expected to become the fourth South American economy in 2018 by surpassing Venezuela.

Exports are growing at a pace of 25% and reached US$28 billion at the end of 2007 and US$30 billion at the end of 2010. In FY 2012 Peruvian exports reached a total of US$46 billion.

=== Narcotics ===
==== Background ====
Coca has a long history of cultivation in the Andes, and has always been a traditional part of Peruvian life. However, the narcotic properties of coca were known only locally until 1786, when Lamarck listed the leaf in his botanical encyclopedia. After the arrival of the Spanish, coca cultivation increased and its use became more common and widespread. Since 1543, coca has been internationally recognized for its trading value, and regulations imposed upon it have attached increasing economic importance to the plant. Exchange of the coca leaf between consumers in the highlands and growers in the low-lying hills has gone on for at least the last millennium, strengthening local economic ties. Between 1884 and 1900, coca and cocaine grew in popularity for medical purposes and mass consumption in the United States. From 1905 to 1922, anti-cocaine sentiments in the US resulted in criminalization of both coca and cocaine. It was not until the 1920s that US diplomats began to extend drug prohibitions internationally.

==== Current trends ====
The Peruvian coca and cocaine industry is as huge as it is today because of advanced industrial nations' demand for drugs. This high demand has created a framework of dependence on "coca-dollars" and on US drug policy. Money from cocaine trafficking feeds local economies, supports inflation, and even causes social changes such as cocaine smoking among indigenous Peruvians. Coca farming today is still a significant source of income for peasants, as it accounts for 48% of total net family income in the high coca-growing Apurímac River region. In an effort to reduce drug use in America, for the past 50 years the US government together with the United Nations have been waging a war on drugs. The US Drug Control Program maintains that "eliminating the cultivation of illicit coca and opium is the best approach to combating cocaine and heroin availability in the US."

With US government cooperation, the Peruvian Government installed the National Plan for the Prevention and Control of Drugs in 1995. This government prohibition of narcotics trafficking in Peru has resulted in a 70% reduction of coca leaf cultivation since 1995. However the reduction in cultivation may not have actual effects on cocaine production, as recent advances in coca growing and more efficient processing methods allow for greater cocaine yield. The size of the narcotics industry as a part of the national economy is difficult to measure, but estimates range from $300–$600 million. An estimated 200,000 Peruvian households have economies based on the production, refining, or distribution of coca. Many economists believe that large flows of dollars into the banking system contribute to the traditional depression of the dollar exchange rate vis-a-vis the sol. The Central Bank engages in open market activities to prevent the price of the sol from rising to levels that would cause Peruvian exports to become prohibitively expensive.

Hurt economically by Peruvian Air Force interdiction efforts in the mid-1990s, drug traffickers are now using land and river routes as well as aircraft to transport cocaine paste and, increasingly, refined cocaine to consumers around and out of the country. The Air Bridge Denial Program was suspended in April 2001 after the Peruvian Air Force and strength of the U.S. DEA misidentified a civilian aircraft as a drug trafficker and shot it down, killing two American citizens on board. Peru continues to arrest drug traffickers and seize drugs and precursor chemicals, destroy coca labs, disable clandestine airstrips, and prosecute officials involved in narcotics corruption.

Working with limited aid of the U.S. Agency for International Development (USAID), the Peruvian Government carries out alternative development programs in the leading coca-growing areas in an effort to convince coca farmers not to grow that crop. Although the government previously eradicated only coca seed beds, in 1998 and 1999 it began to eradicate mature coca being grown in national parks and elsewhere in the main coca growing valleys. In 1999 the government eradicated more than 150 km^{2} of coca; this figure declined to 65 km^{2} in 2000, due largely to political instability. The government agency "Contradrogas", founded in 1996, facilitates coordination among Peruvian Government agencies working on counter-narcotics issues. Alternative crops, however, are not economically comparable to coca. 2004 prices indicate an annual income per hectare of $600 for coffee and $1000 for cocoa, versus up to $7500 for a hectare of coca.

For the global push towards a green economy, sustainability depends on access to minerals such as copper, lithium, and rare earth elements. Peru, as one of the most resource-rich nations in the world, plays an important role. Peru is currently considered the world's second-largest exporter of minerals such as copper, silver, zinc, and lithium; these minerals are essential to the technologies that drive change in industry to a cleaner and more sustainable future. This year, in August 2024, Peru and the United States signed a memorandum of understanding (MOU) for greater foreign direct investment (FDI) and shared technological innovation. The MOU represents Peru as the US supply for the accessibility of essential minerals, guaranteeing responsible extraction processes. Peru has more than 6 t of lithium and managed 31 active copper projects with almost US$40 billion in potential investments. Thus, this partnership marks a new era for the Peruvian economy. (Owen, 2024)

==== Effect on family economies ====
The anti-coca policies imposed in 1995 have had adverse effects on Peruvian's household economies. Many families dependent on coca farming have been forced to send their children to work as eradication of crops has decreased their household income. In states where coca is grown, child labour increased by 18% in 1997 and 40% in 2000. Work hours and domestic work increased as well, with girls taking on 28% more domestic work with boys doing 13% more. Wage work for adults also increased since 1995. As such, it can be inferred that the increase in child labour since eradication policies have come into effect is caused by children filling in for working parents. However, the issue of child labour in cocoa production is still present in Peru as reported in 2013 in the U.S. Department of Labor's report Findings on the Worst Forms of Child Labor and in December 2014, in the Bureau of International Labor Affairs's List of Goods Produced by Child Labor or Forced Labor.

=== Corruption ===
Peru is the 101st least corrupt country in the world according to Transparency International's Corruption Perceptions Index.

The Peruvian organization "Ciudadanos al Dia" has started to measure and compare transparency, costs, and efficiency in different government departments in Peru. It annually awards the best practices which has received widespread media attention. This has created competition among government agencies to improve.

A recent case of corruption was the 2008 oil scandal, which caused protests in large cities around Peru. The cabinet has to resign due to the scandal. However, a judge absolved all the officials involved in the case in 2016.

== Statistics ==
=== Main economic indicators ===
The following table shows the main economic indicators in 1980–2021 (with IMF staff stimtates in 2022–2027). Inflation below 5% is in green.

Year	GDP (in Bil. US$PPP)	GDP per capita (in US$ PPP)	GDP (in Bil. US$nominal)	GDP per capita (in US$ nominal)	GDP growth (real)	Inflation rate (in Percent)	Unemployment (in Percent)	Government debt (in % of GDP)
1980	53.9	3,111.3	20.2	1,164.8	▲7.7%	▲59.1%	7.3%	n/a
1981	▲62.3	▲3,503.5	▲24.4	▲1,373.1	▲5.5%	▲75.4%	▼6.8%	n/a
1982	▲65.9	▲3,618.9	▼24.3	▼1,332.5	▼-0.3%	▲64.5%	▼6.4%	n/a
1983	▼62.1	▼3,329.7	▼18.9	▼1,011.7	▼-9.3%	▲111.1%	▲9.0%	n/a
1984	▲66.8	▲3,498.4	▲19.4	▲1,018.8	▲3.8%	▲110.2%	▼8.9%	n/a
1985	▲70.3	▲3,601.1	▼16.8	▼861.6	▲2.1%	▲163.4%	▼4.6%	n/a
1986	▲80.4	▲4,026.1	▲25.2	▲1,263.7	▲12.1%	▲77.9%	▲5.3%	n/a
1987	▲88.8	▲4,346.5	▲41.7	▲2,040.7	▲7.7%	▲85.8%	▼4.8%	n/a
1988	▼83.3	▼3,987.4	▼33.0	▼1,579.5	▼-9.4%	▲667.0%	▼4.2%	n/a
1989	▼74.9	▼3,512.3	▲40.7	▲1,908.5	▼-13.4%	▲3398.3%	▲7.9%	n/a
1990	▼73.8	▼3,388.6	▼28.3	▼1,301.5	▼-5.1%	▲7481.7%	▲8.3%	n/a
1991	▲77.9	▲3,510.0	▲34.0	▲1,530.7	▲2.2%	▲409.5%	▼5.9%	n/a
1992	▲79.3	▼3,501.8	▲35.4	▲1,562.6	▼-0.5%	▲73.5%	▲9.4%	n/a
1993	▲85.4	▲3,702.0	▼34.3	▼1,487.9	▲5.2%	▲48.6%	▲9.9%	n/a
1994	▲98.0	▲4,169.0	▲43.2	▲1,839.2	▲12.3%	▲23.7%	▼8.8%	n/a
1995	▲107.4	▲4,490.8	▲51.4	▲2,147.4	▲7.4%	▲11.1%	▼7.1%	n/a
1996	▲112.5	▲4,619.6	▲53.4	▲2,193.7	▲2.8%	▲11.5%	▲7.2%	n/a
1997	▲121.8	▲4,918.8	▲56.3	▲2,272.4	▲6.5%	▲8.5%	▲8.6%	n/a
1998	▲122.7	▼4,873.1	▼53.9	▼2,141.1	▼-0.4%	▲7.3%	▼6.9%	n/a
1999	▲126.3	▲4,936.0	▼48.7	▼1,903.9	▲1.5%	▲3.5%	▲9.4%	n/a
2000	▲132.6	▲5,105.1	▲50.4	▲1,940.2	▲2.7%	▲3.8%	▼7.8%	44.9%
2001	▲136.5	▲5,176.0	▲51.0	▼1,935.5	▲0.6%	▲2.0%	▲9.2%	▼43.8%
2002	▲146.2	▲5,466.1	▲54.0	▲2,017.8	▲5.5%	▲0.2%	▲9.4%	▲45.5%
2003	▲155.3	▲5,728.1	▲58.5	▲2,159.7	▲4.2%	▲2.3%	9.4%	▲49.4%
2004	▲167.3	▲6,093.4	▲66.1	▲2,408.1	▲5.0%	▲3.7%	9.4%	▼46.7%
2005	▲183.4	▲6,595.2	▲74.2	▲2,669.2	▲6.3%	▲1.6%	▲9.6%	▼40.4%
2006	▲203.3	▲7,222.1	▲87.5	▲3,106.7	▲7.5%	▲2.0%	▼8.5%	▼34.9%
2007	▲226.6	▲7,955.7	▲102.2	▲3,587.8	▲8.5%	▲1.8%	▼8.4%	▼31.9%
2008	▲252.0	▲8,748.4	▲121.3	▲4,209.0	▲9.1%	▲5.8%	8.4%	▼28.0%
2009	▲256.4	▲8,801.7	▲121.8	▼4,179.7	▲1.1%	▲2.9%	8.4%	▲28.3%
2010	▲281.1	▲9,541.6	▲148.9	▲5,055.5	▲8.3%	▲1.5%	▼7.9%	▼25.3%
2011	▲305.1	▲10,239.4	▲170.9	▲5,736.1	▲6.3%	▲3.4%	▼7.7%	▼23.0%
2012	▲318.4	▲10,567.0	▲193.1	▲6,407.6	▲6.1%	▲3.7%	▼6.8%	▼21.1%
2013	▲338.7	▲11,115.3	▲202.6	▲6,647.5	▲5.9%	▲2.8%	▼5.9%	▼19.9%
2014	▲349.9	▲11,356.0	▲202.9	▼6,584.0	▲2.4%	▲3.2%	5.9%	▲20.6%
2015	▲356.8	▲11,454.4	▼192.0	▼6,164.2	▲3.3%	▲3.5%	▲6.5%	▲24.0%
2016	▲378.5	▲12,019.8	▲195.5	▲6,207.4	▲4.0%	▲3.6%	▲6.7%	▲24.3%
2017	▲402.0	▲12,631.7	▲215.7	▲6,776.9	▲2.5%	▲2.8%	▲6.9%	▲25.2%
2018	▲428.0	▲13,307.2	▲226.8	▲7,051.6	▲4.0%	▲1.3%	▼6.7%	▲26.0%
2019	▲445.4	▲13,430.2	▲232.3	▼7,006.3	▲2.2%	▲2.1%	▼6.6%	▲26.9%
2020	▼401.1	▼11,975.3	▼205.8	▼6,145.0	▼-11.0%	▲1.8%	▲13.9%	▲35.0%
2021	▲474.4	▲14,022.8	▲225.9	▲6,678.9	▲13.6%	▲4.0%	▼10.9%	▲36.4%
2022	▲521.8	▲15,273.2	▲239.3	▲7,004.8	▲2.7%	▲7.5%	▼7.6%	▼34.8%
2023	▲554.5	▲16,067.4	▲253.8	▲7,353.4	▲2.6%	▲4.4%	▼7.5%	▲35.7%
2024	▲584.2	▲16,762.7	▲266.8	▲7,655.6	▲3.2%	▲2.5%	▼7.4%	35.7%
2025	▲613.5	▲17,428.4	▲279.7	▲7,945.5	▲3.1%	▲2.1%	▼7.3%	▼35.7%
2026	▲644.0	▲18,111.8	▲293.2	▲8,246.5	▲3.0%	▲2.0%	▼7.2%	▼35.2%
2027	▲676.1	▲18,828.5	▲307.4	▲8,560.9	▲3.0%	▲2.0%	▼7.0%	▼34.3%

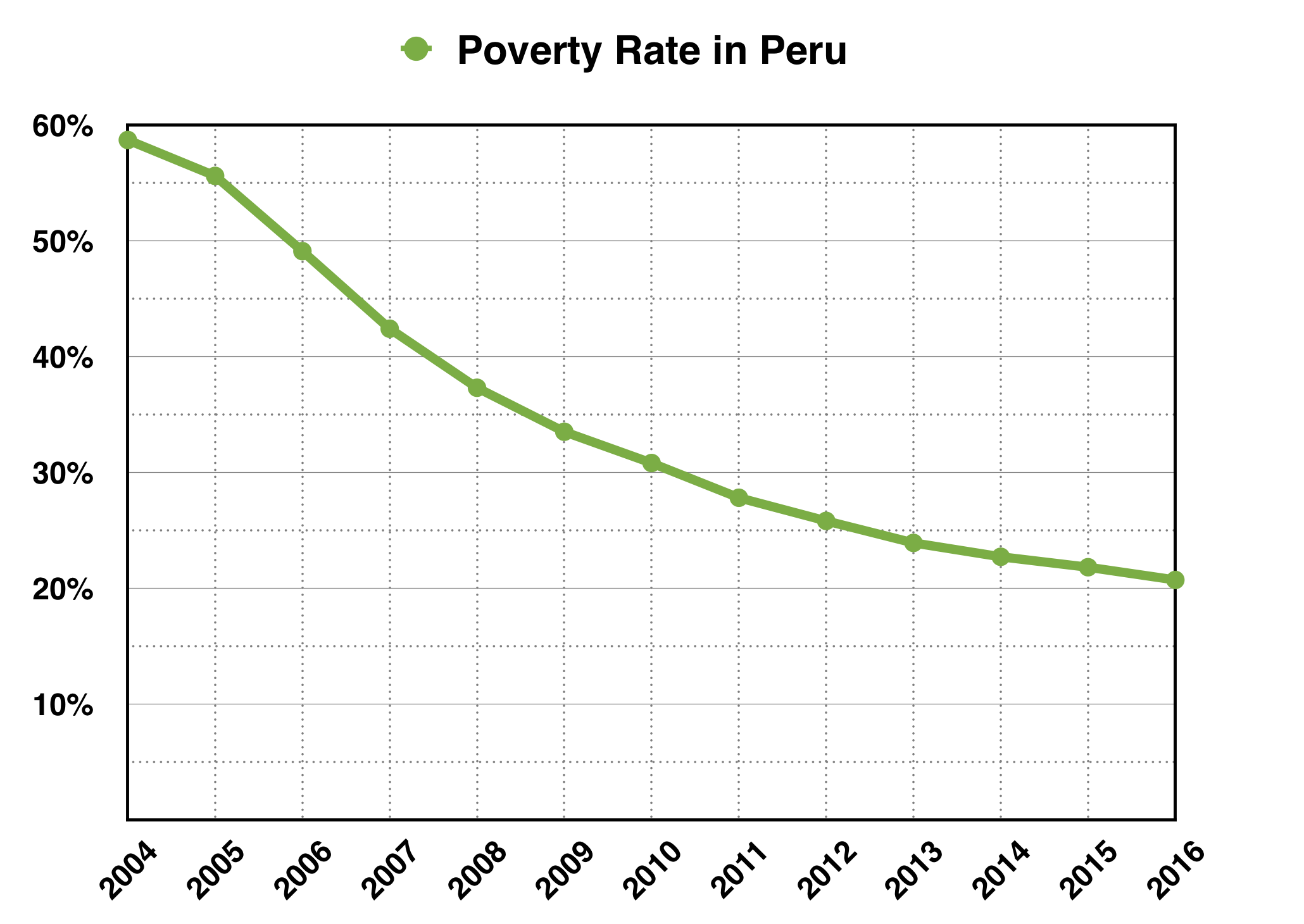
Peru's poverty rate from 2004 to 2012.

Household income or consumption by percentage share:
lowest 10%: 0.8%
highest 10%: 37.5% (2000)

Inflation rate (consumer prices): 2.08% (2010)

Budget:
revenues: $57 billion (2014 est.)
expenditures: $50 billion, including long-term capital expenditures of $3.8 billion (2010 est.)

Industrial production growth rate: 12% (2013 est.)

Electricity – production: 175,500 GWh (2013 est.)

Electricity – production by source:
natural gas: 44.53%
hydro: 54.79%
nuclear: 0%
other: 0.68% (2013)

Electricity – consumption: 133,000 GWh (2013)

Electricity – exports: 32,000 kWh (2013) mainly to Ecuador

Electricity – imports: 0 kWh (2013)

Agriculture – products: coffee, cotton, sugarcane, rice, wheat, potatoes, plantains, coca; poultry, beef, dairy products, wool; fish

Exports: 63.5 billion f.o.b. (2013 est.) of goods and products. 10.5 billion f.o.b. (2013 est.) of services. Total Exports $73.5 billion f.o.b. (2013) Exports: fish and fish products, copper, zinc, gold, molybdenum, iron, crude petroleum and byproducts, lead; coffee, asparagus, artichokes, paprika, sugar, cotton, textiles, chemicals, pharmaceuticals, manufactures, machinery, services.

Exports – partners: Mainland China 20%, United States 15%, European Union 15%, Brazil 10%, Chile 10%, Japan 5%, Mexico 5%, United Kingdom 5%, Bolivia 5% Rest of Latin America 5%, Rest of world 5%, (2013)

Imports: Total Imports $68 billion f.o.b. (2013)

Imports – commodities: machinery, transport equipment, foodstuffs, iron and steel, pharmaceuticals, electronics, petroleum and chemicals.

Imports – partners: Mainland China 25%, US 15%, European Union 15%, Brazil 10%, Japan 10%, Chile 5%, Colombia 5%, Mexico 5%, Ecuador 4%, Bolivia 1%, Rest of World 5% (2013).

== See also ==
- List of companies of Peru
- List of Peruvian regions by GDP
- Taxation in Peru
- Andean Countries–United Kingdom Trade Agreement
- Peruvian sol

== Bibliography ==
- Cushman, G. T. (2005). "'The Most Valuable Birds in the World': International Conservation Science and the Revival of Peru's Guano Industry, 1909–1965". Environmental History. 10 (3): 477–509. doi:10.1093/envhis/10.3.477. hdl:1808/11737.
- Cushman, G. T. (2013). Guano and the opening of the Pacific world: a global ecological history. Cambridge University Press. ISBN 978-1-107-00413-9.
- Espinoza, G. Antonio (2013). Education and the State in Modern Peru: Primary Schooling in Lima, 1821–c. 1921. Palgrave Macmillan. ISBN 978-1-349-46404-3.
