= Marcus Kurtz =

American political scientist

- Education: University of California (PhD), University of Michigan, Ann Arbor (BA)
- Awards: Choice Outstanding Academic Title (2005)
- Scientific career
- Fields: political methodology, comparative politics
- Institutions: Ohio State University

Marcus J. Kurtz is an American political scientist and chair and College of Arts and Sciences Distinguished Professor of Political Science at Ohio State University. He is known for his work on political methodology and comparative politics.

== Books ==
- Latin American State Building in Comparative Perspective: Social Foundations of Institutional Order, Cambridge: Cambridge University Press, 2013
- Free Market Democracy and the Chilean and Mexican Countryside, Cambridge: Cambridge University Press, 2004 (Choice Outstanding Academic Title, 2005)

== See also ==
- Chilean expansionism
- Critical juncture theory
