= Taxation in Peru =

Taxation represents the biggest source of revenues for the Peruvian government (up to 76%). For 2016, the projected amount of taxation revenues was S/.94.6 billion ($29 billion). There are four taxes that make up approximately 90 percent of the taxation revenues:

- the income tax (both corporate and personal),
- the value-added tax (VAT),
- the import tax,
- the excise tax.

All these four types of taxes are imposed at the national level. There are also municipal taxes based on an individual's or household's residence as well as a municipal property tax and a municipal vehicle tax.

== Income tax ==
Peruvian income taxes may be divided into 2 large groups:

=== Corporate income tax ===
The general income tax annual rate for resident entities is 29.5%. In addition to this, resident entities are obliged to make advance payments on a monthly basis by applying a coefficient over the accrued taxable income of the month. Advance payments are to be offset against the annual income tax obligation.

All resident companies are subject to this income tax on their worldwide taxable income. Resident companies are those incorporated in Peru. Branches and permanent establishments of foreign companies that are located in Peru and non-resident entities are taxed only on income from Peruvian sources.

Various significant tax incentives are available for investments in the following areas:

- Mining enterprises,
- Oil and gas licenses and services contracts,
- Certain agricultural activities,
- Capital markets.

They are available also for investments in manufacturing industries located in the jungles, in designated tax-free zones and in borderline areas of the country. Furthermore, companies involved in certain economic sectors may be subject to special or reduced income tax rates (i.e. companies involved in agriculture, animal husbandry and similar activities are entitled to a 15% rate).

=== Personal income tax ===
Peru also has an income tax for individuals. Peruvian citizens domiciled in Peru are subject to taxation on their worldwide income. Individuals not domiciled in Peru are only taxed in this country on their Peruvian sourced income.

Foreigners residing or staying in Peru for more than 183 days within any given 12-month period, will be given the status of individuals domiciled in the country from January 1 of the following fiscal year in which the duration of stay expires.

Dividends distributed by companies incorporated or established in Peru, received by individuals, are subject to the following rates:

- 4.1% on results as of December 31, 2014,
- 6.8% on results generated in 2015 and 2016,
- 5% on results generated from 2017 onwards.

This, currently valid Dividend Tax rate of 5%, is imposed on distributions of profits to nonresidents and individuals by resident companies and by branches, permanent establishments and agencies of foreign companies.

=== Value added tax (VAT) ===
The general rate of VAT is 18% (16% of VAT itself plus 2% of municipal promotion tax). VAT in Peru is generally imposed on the following transactions: sale of movable property, rendering and use of services, construction contracts, first sale of real property (except land) made by builders and the import of goods.

As occurs with many indirect tax systems, to determine the tax payable by the company performing the above-mentioned transactions (output VAT), the VAT paid in the company's acquisitions is accepted as a tax credit (input VAT). Exporters can recover VAT paid in acquisitions for up to 18 per cent of an export's free on board (FOB) value.

Companies that have not commenced productive operations with a pre-production stage equal to or longer than two years may resort to a special system to obtain the advanced recovery of the VAT levied on certain acquisitions provided that they execute an investment agreement with the state.

=== Excise Tax ===
Excise tax rates, and the manner on which the tax is applied, depend on the type of goods or services. The specific goods which are subject to excise tax include fuel, cigarettes, beer, liquor, and vehicles.

=== Tax administration ===
The Superintendencia Nacional de Administración Tributaria (SUNAT) (English version: National Superintendency of Tax Administration) is the government administrative body and the most important tax authority responsible for collecting of the national taxes. It means all taxes assigned as public resources of the national government (taxes on income, sales, assets and financial transactions, as well as customs duties), public pensions and health security system contributions.

In addition to this, each of the approximately 1 800 municipalities in Peru is considered as a separate tax authority with respect to municipal taxes (mainly taxes on the ownership and transfer of immovable property, real estate and payment of municipal public services). Tax authorities have discretionary faculties to exercise their auditing duties, which are not conducted on a routine cycle but rather on a variable basis. Larger businesses are usually audited every year, while medium-sized and small businesses may be audited on a biannual or lower frequency rate. However, all Peruvian-resident legal entities must file tax returns and pay taxes both on a monthly and annual basis. The annual tax returns must be filed by the end of March or beginning of April, depending on the taxpayer number.

=== Double taxation treaties ===
Currently, in order to avoid double taxation, Peru has signed and ratified treaties with the following countries: Brazil, Chile, Canada, Portugal, South Korea, Switzerland; and Mexico. All these treaties are largely based on the OECD Model Tax Convention.

Negotiations to conclude tax treaties with Italy, Japan, the Netherlands, Qatar, Singapore, Thailand and the United Kingdom, and renegotiations with Spain, still continue.

Peru is also a member of the Andean Community, along with Colombia, Ecuador and Bolivia. In this regard, Decision No. 578 is applicable for avoiding double taxation between Andean Community member countries, as well as for preventing tax evasion. Decision No. 578 prioritizes the taxation at the source, using the exemption method.
