= Chilean expansionism =

Foreign policy of Chile

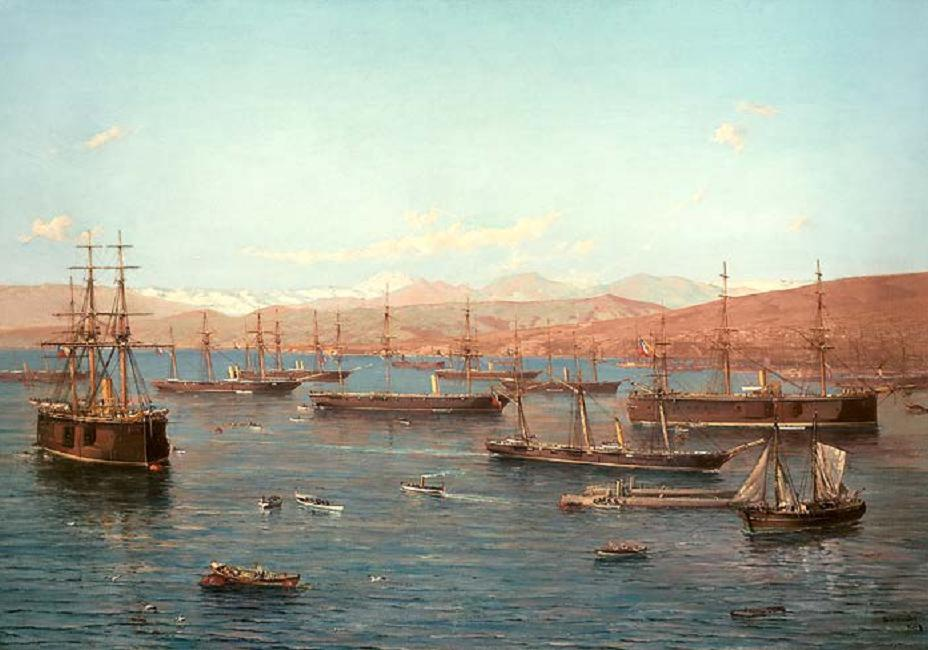
Vessels of the Chilean Navy anchored in the Bay of Valparaíso, 1879

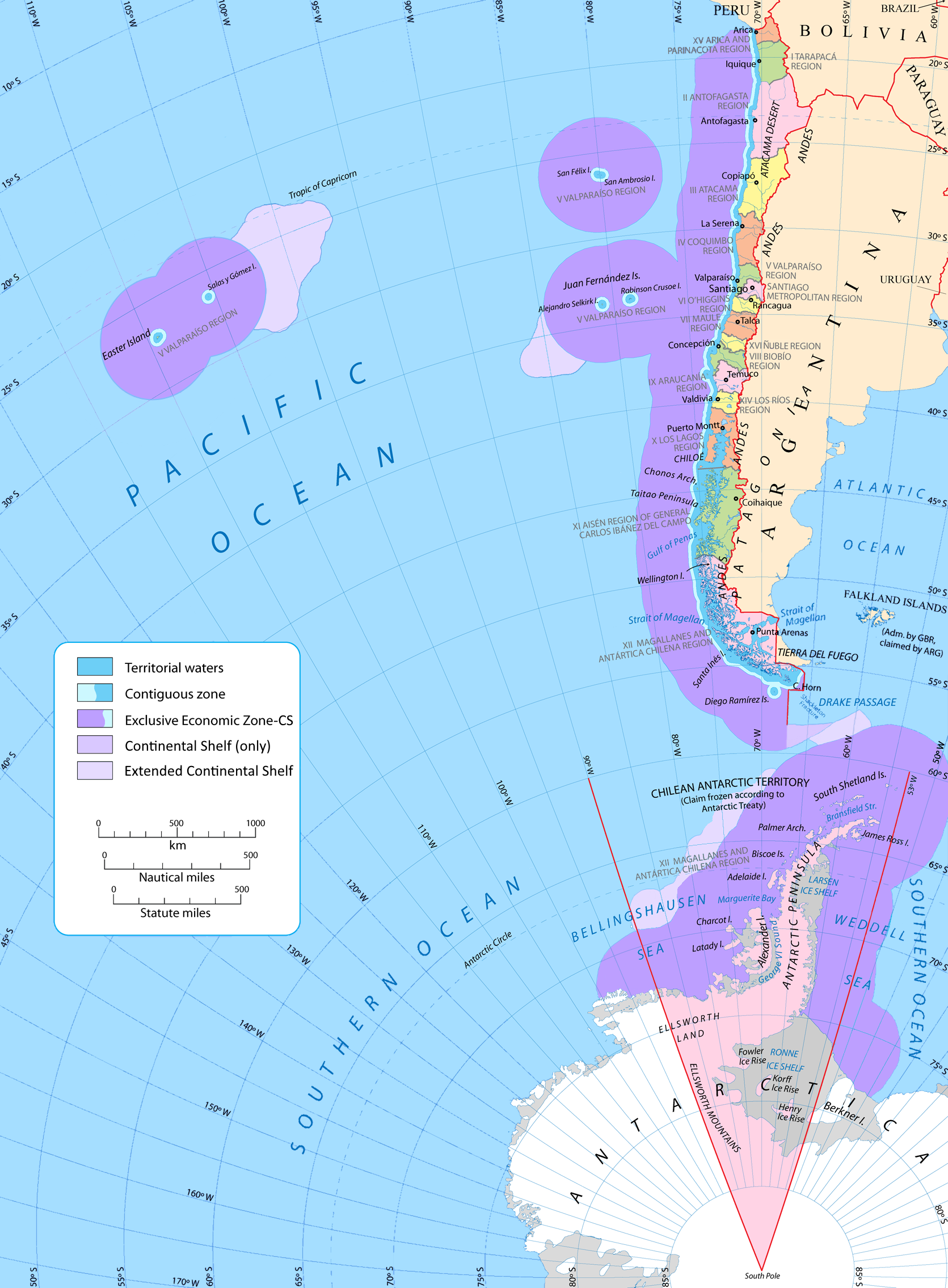
Map of Chile, including offshore islands, maritime exclusive economic zone, Chilean extended continental shelf and its Antarctic claim.

Chilean expansionism refers to the foreign policy of Chile to expand its territorial control over key strategic locations and economic resources as a means to ensure its national security and assert its power in South America. (Note: According to political scientist Marcus J. Kurtz: "It was the construction of an elite consensus in Chile around the desirability of initiating wars of conquest — from which the dominant classes expected to benefit — that turned military conflict into a component of the process by which an effective administration was constructed. Successive conflicts — with the Araucanian Indians to the south, with Spain, and repeatedly with Peru and Bolivia — were both initiated by the Chilean state and used to justify the expansion of public powers, the creation of an effective standing army, and the imposition of substantial new tax burdens, and the creation of major public infrastructure.") Chile's significant territorial acquisitions, which occurred mostly throughout the 19th century, paved the way for its emergence as a thalassocracy and one of the three most powerful and wealthiest states in South America during the 20th century. It also formed Chile's geopolitical and national identity as a tricontinental state and one of the countries with the longest coastlines in the world.

Most of the territory was owned by Chile de jure but not controlled de facto.

After achieving its independence from Spain in 1818, Chile held control of territory spanning roughly the same boundaries of the colonial general captaincy that was under the control of the Spanish Empire's Viceroyalty of Peru. Under the uti possidetis iuris principle that delimited the international boundaries of the newly independent South American states, Chile bordered at its north with Bolivia in the Atacama Desert and at its east with Argentina. To the south, Chile claimed all lands west of the Andes and the entirety of Patagonia (principally for the Strait of Magellan), but in practice controlled only the area down to the Bío Bío River plus the area between Valdivia and Chiloé—the rest of the territory being either controlled by the independent Mapuche of Araucanía or sparsely populated by other indigenous tribes.

The uti possidetis system proved ephemeral, nonetheless; the lack of formal border treaties caused territorial disputes throughout the continent. This uncertainty presented both challenges and opportunities for Chile, with regional instability creating a precarious state of diplomatic affairs but also allowing the growth of Chilean power ambitions. The Chilean national elite sought to ensure that the country's territorial limits and the regional balance of power would favor its economic and political aspirations. Towards this end, the country increased its military power, especially its naval presence, to pursue a policy of intimidation and force.

To its north, Chile imposed its dominance by eliminating the threat posed by the union of Bolivia with Peru during the War of the Confederation (1836–1839), followed by the conquest of these countries' mineral-rich territories in the Atacama during the War of the Pacific (1879–1884)—in the process leaving Bolivia landlocked and occupying the Peruvian capital. To its south and east, Chile used military force and colonization to occupy Araucanía (1861–1883) and successfully dispute Argentine claims over westernmost Patagonia and the Strait of Magellan—the outbreak of war only narrowly avoided on multiple occasions. Chile's expansionist drive practically culminated with Easter Island's annexation in 1888, but vestiges of it continued well into the 20th century—e.g., the country's claim over Antarctic territory in 1940.

Although Chile did not fulfill all of its territorial ambitions, its relative success attracted the attention of the Western Hemisphere's other major expansionist polity, the United States, and cemented Chile's status as a regional power in Latin America. Chile's territorial expansion also left a legacy of distrust with its neighbors, all of which continue having boundary disputes with Chile. The country's mistreatment of the non-Chilean inhabitants of its conquered territories, particularly the state-sponsored forced cultural assimilation process of "Chilenization", have further led to internal tensions and calls for greater autonomy, if not independence, from the Mapuche and the Rapa Nui.

== Origins ==
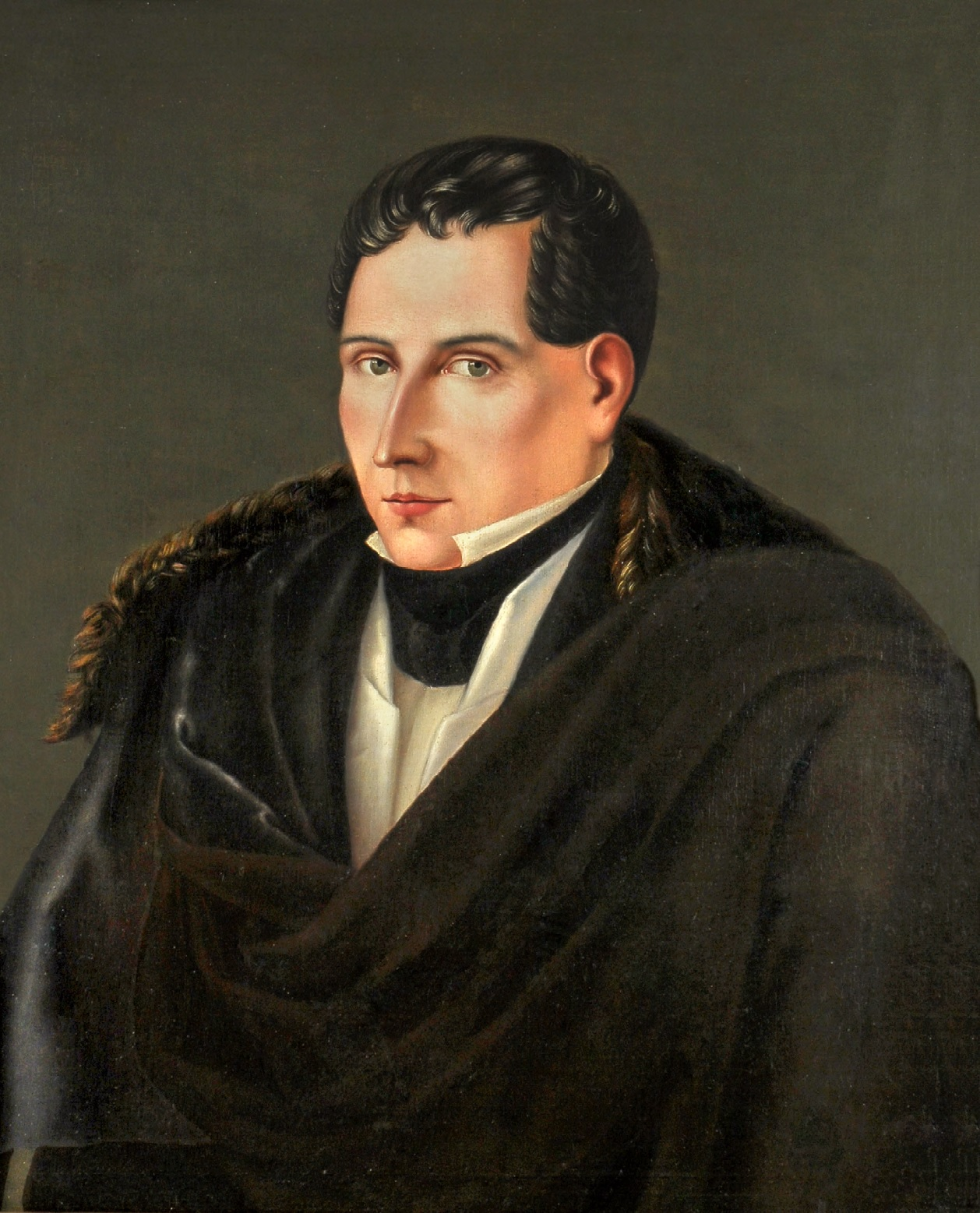
Chilean statesman Diego Portales was the lead proponent of his country's aggressive foreign policy

The newly independent Republic of Chile's territorial possessions, inherited from the colonial general captaincy (capitanía general) that was under the control of the Spanish Empire's Viceroyalty of Peru, had left the state surrounded by undefined boundaries. Its northernmost settlement was Copiapó in the southern Atacama Desert, bordering Bolivia; however, its exact boundary was disputed until 1866, when both countries delimited their boundaries at the 24° South parallel from the Pacific Ocean. Its southernmost settlement was Concepción, a few kilometers north of the frontier fortifications between Chile and the Araucanía, the territory that the Mapuche indigenous peoples had successfully retained after defeating Spain in the Arauco War.

English: "We must always dominate in the Pacific: This must be its [Chile's] maxim now, and hopefully will be Chile's forever"
Spanish: "Debemos dominar para siempre en el Pacífico: ésta debe ser su máxima ahora, y ojalá fuera la de Chile para siempre"

— Diego Portales, Letter to Vice Admiral Manuel Blanco Encalada (10 September 1836).

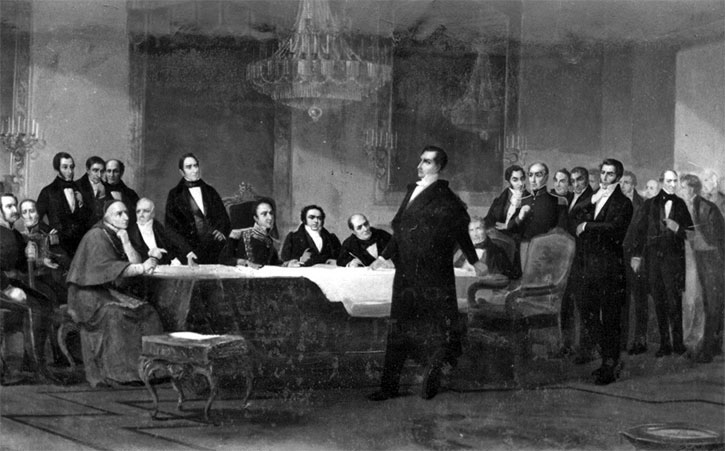
Portales convinced the Chilean elite to fight for the dissolution of the union between Bolivia and Peru in 1836.

== History ==
=== Conquest of the Atacama ===
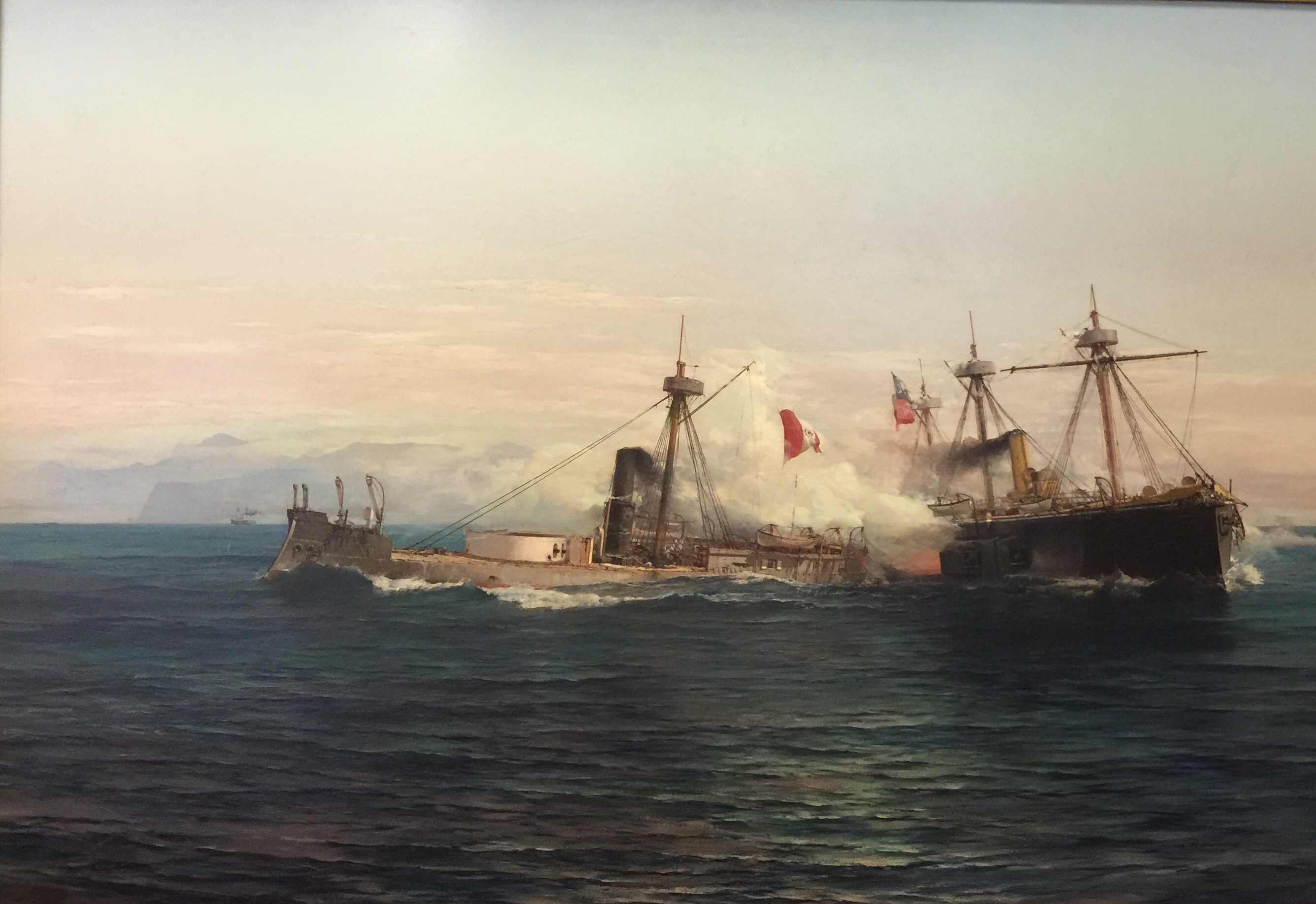
Chile's capture of Peru's warship Huáscar, in 1879, further assured its naval supremacy and victory in the war.

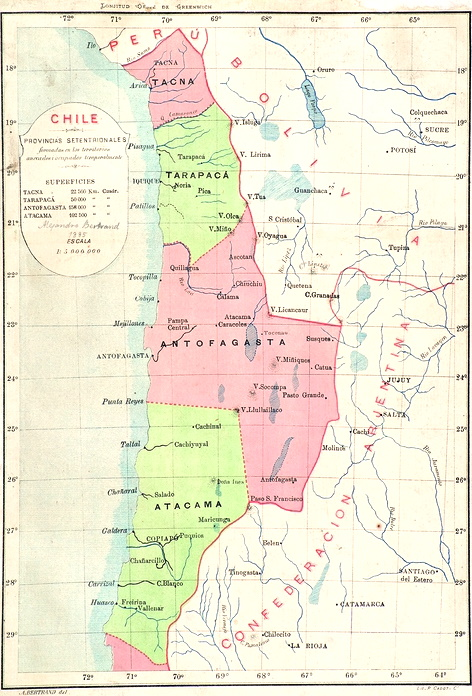
Territories gained in the war of the Pacific (to the north of Atacama Province).

To its north, Chile imposed its dominance by eliminating the threat posed by the union of Bolivia with Peru during the War of the Confederation (1836–1839), followed by the conquest of these countries' mineral-rich territories in the Atacama during the War of the Pacific (1879–1884)—in the process leaving Bolivia landlocked and sacking the Peruvian capital. Chile gained control over Tacna, Arica, Tarapacá, Antofagasta and Puna de Atacama. Tacna and Puna de Atacama territories were mostly lost later on by diplomacy.

Chile slowly started to expand its influence and to establish its borders. By the Tantauco Treaty, the archipelago of Chiloé was incorporated in 1826. The economy began to boom due to the discovery of silver ore in Chañarcillo, and the growing trade of the port of Valparaíso, which led to conflict over maritime supremacy in the Pacific with Peru.

The Boundary treaty of 1881 between Chile and Argentina confirmed Chilean sovereignty over the Strait of Magellan. As a result of the War of the Pacific with Peru and Bolivia (1879–83), Chile expanded its territory northward by almost one-third, eliminating Bolivia's access to the Pacific, and acquired valuable nitrate deposits, the exploitation of which led to an era of national affluence. Chile had joined the stand as one of the high-income countries in South America by 1870.

=== Occupation of Araucanía ===
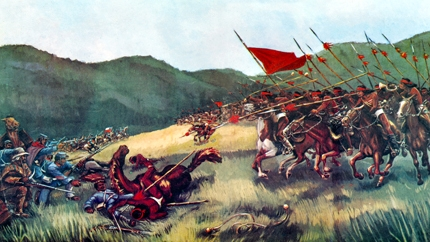
Chile's occupation of the Araucanía was fiercely resisted by the Mapuche, who resorted to cavalry raids for defense

To its south and east, Chile used military force and colonization to occupy Araucanía (1861–1883) and successfully dispute Argentine claims over westernmost Patagonia and the Strait of Magellan—the outbreak of war only narrowly avoided in multiple occasions.

=== Colonization of Valdivia, Osorno, Llanquihue and Patagonia ===
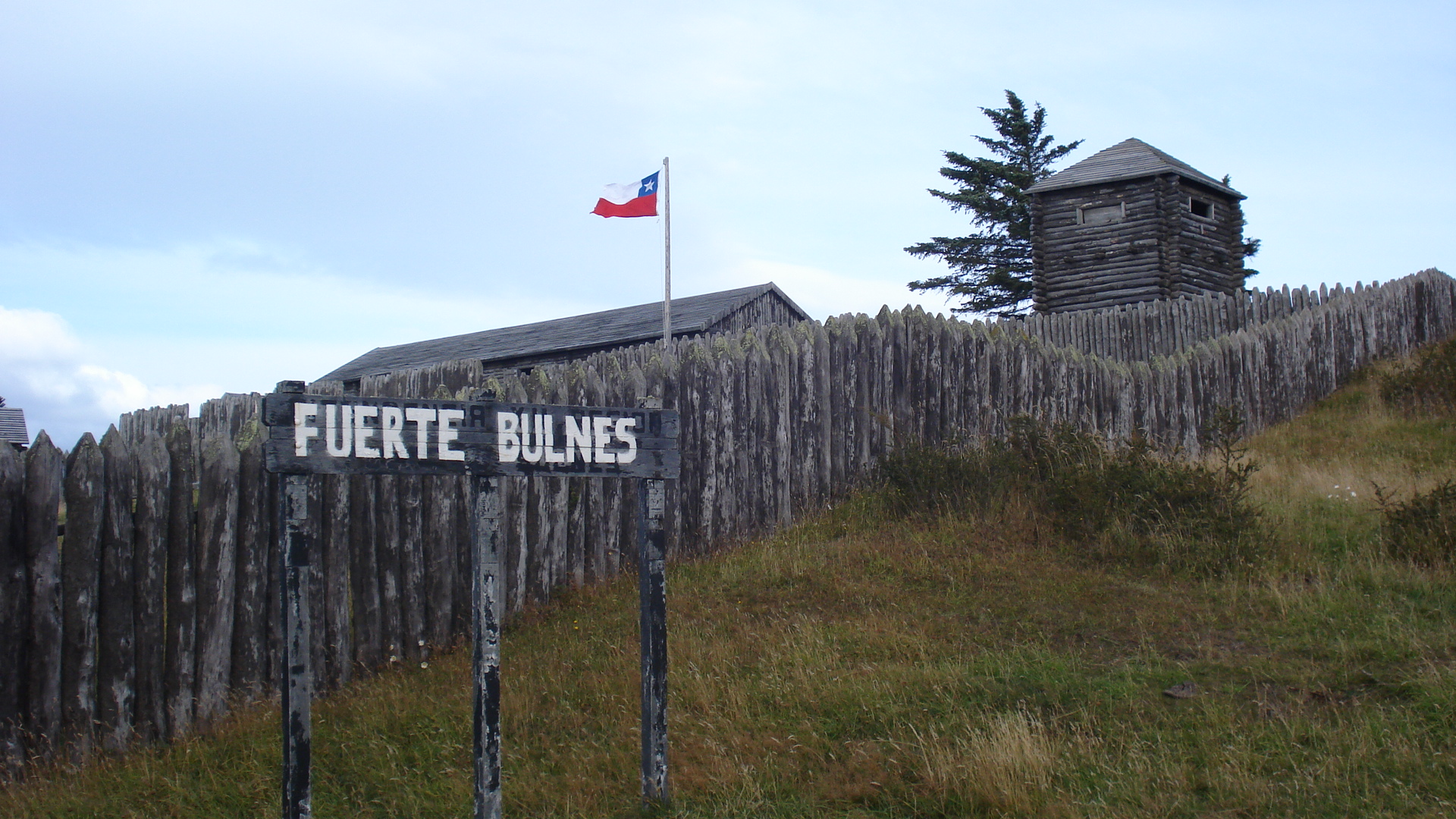
Reconstruction of Fuerte Bulnes in Chilean Patagonia

At the same time, attempts were made to strengthen sovereignty in southern Chile intensifying penetration into Araucanía and colonizing Llanquihue with German immigrants in 1848. Through the founding of Fort Bulnes by the Schooner Ancud under the command of John Williams Wilson, the Magallanes region joined the country in 1843, while the Antofagasta area, at the time part of, Bolivia, began to fill with people.

There was a failed Chilean settlement in "Puerto Gallegos" on the banks of the river of the same name since March 4, 1873. The governor of Magallanes, Óscar Viel y Toro, commissioned by Minister Adolfo Ibáñez Gutiérrez, was in charge of founding the settlement, which would only last six weeks after the diplomatic agreement between this country and the Argentine Nation. There was also the presence of Chilean ships up to the Santa Cruz River.

=== Annexation of Easter Island ===
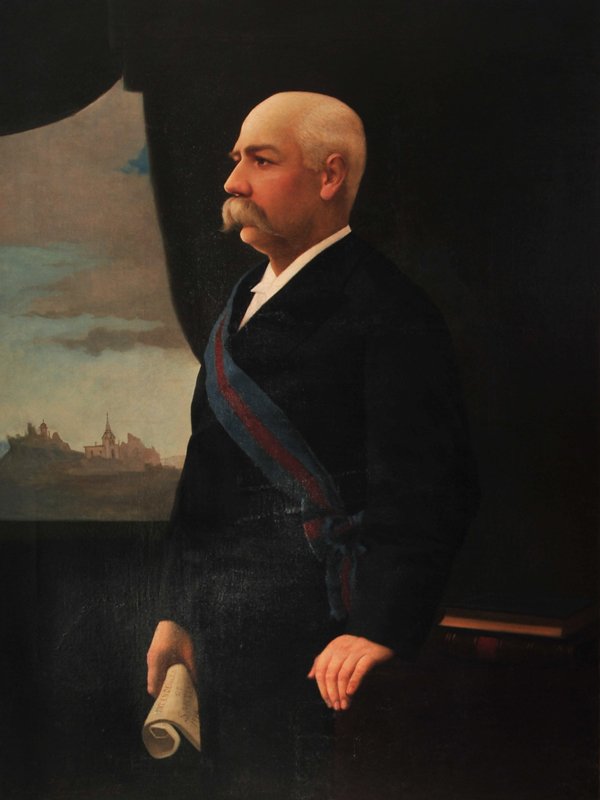
Chilean statesman Vicuña Mackenna was a major advocate of Chilean expansionism into Polynesia

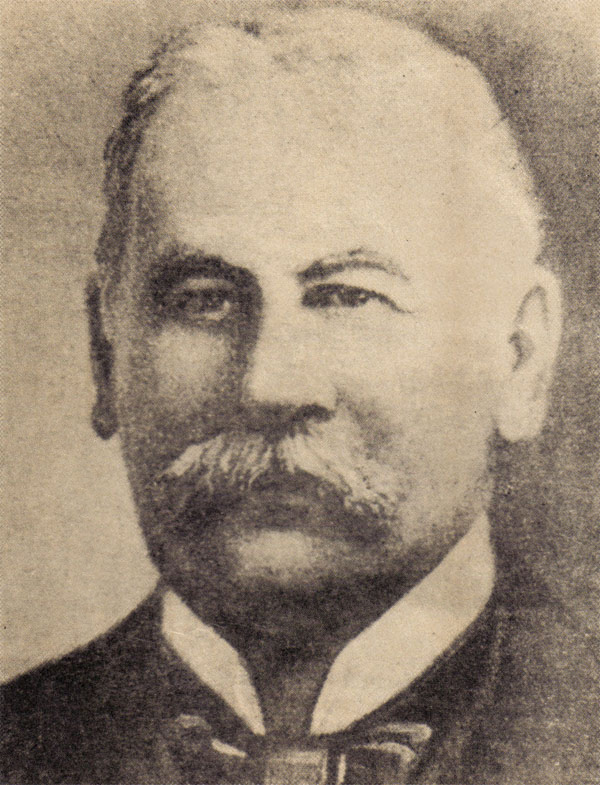
Policarpo Toro

Chile's interest in expanding into the islands of the Pacific Ocean dates to the presidency of José Joaquín Prieto (1831–1841) and the ideology of Diego Portales, who considered that Chile's expansion into Polynesia was a natural consequence of its maritime destiny. (Note: According to economist Neantro Saavedra-Rivano: "Of all Latin American countries, Chile has been the most explicit and consistent throughout its history in expressing its vocation as a Pacific nation and acting in accordance with this conception.") The first stage of the country's expansionism into the Pacific began a decade later, in 1851, when—in response to an American incursion into the Juan Fernández Islands—Chile's government formally organized the islands into a subdelegation of Valparaíso. That same year, Chile's merchant fleet briefly succeeded in creating an agricultural goods exchange market that connected the Californian port of San Francisco with Australia, renewing Chile's economic interest in the Pacific. By 1861, Chile had established a lucrative enterprise across the Pacific, its national currency abundantly circulating throughout Polynesia and its merchants trading in the markets of Tahiti, New Zealand, Tasmania, and Shanghai; moreover, negotiations were also made with the Spanish Philippines, and altercations reportedly occurred between Chilean and American whalers in the Sea of Japan. This period ended as a result of the Chilean merchant fleet's destruction by Spanish forces in 1866, during the Chincha Islands War.

Chile's Polynesian aspirations would again be awakened in the aftermath of the country's decisive victory against Peru in the War of the Pacific, which left the Chilean fleet as the dominant maritime force in the Pacific coast of the Americas. Valparaíso had also become the most important port in the Pacific coast of South America, providing Chilean merchants with the capacity to find markets in the Pacific for its new mineral wealth acquired from the Atacama. During this period, the Chilean intellectual and politician Benjamín Vicuña Mackenna (who served as senator in the National Congress from 1876 to 1885) was an influential voice in favor of Chilean expansionism into the Pacific—he considered Spain's discoveries in the Pacific to have been taken by the British, and envisioned that Chile's duty was to create an empire in the Pacific that would reach Asian shores. In the context of this imperialist fervor in 1886, Captain Policarpo Toro of the Chilean Navy proposed to his superiors the annexation of Easter Island; a proposal that attained support from President José Manuel Balmaceda because of the island's apparent strategic location and economic value. After Toro transferred the rights to the island's sheep ranching operations from Tahiti-based businesses to the Chilean-based Williamson-Balfour Company in 1887, Easter Island's annexation process was culminated with the signing of the "Agreement of Wills" between Rapa Nui chieftains and Toro, in name of the Chilean government, in 1888.

=== Antarctic claim ===
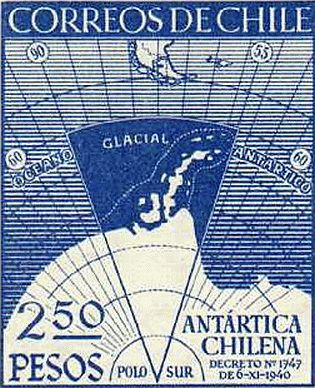
Commemorative stamp of the Chilean Antarctic declaration of 1940

Chile claims to have sovereignty over part of Antarctica inherited from the Spanish Empire since 1539, more specifically from the Governorate of Terra Australis which was transferred to the Kingdom of Chile in 1555.

In 1603, Admiral Gabriel de Castilla, who left Valparaíso to reconnoiter the coasts of Chile, reached the southwest coast, reaching the 64th degree south, discovering the first Antarctic lands, and it was not until 1616 that Cape Horn was discovered.

In the 19th century the growth of the Chilean colony in Magallanes, and then in the city of Punta Arenas, allowed the founding of companies for hunting and exploitation of whales in Antarctic seas, which requested authorization from the Chilean government. In 1894, the power for the exploitation of marine resources in the south of the parallel 54°S was given to the Punta Arenas Municipality.

In the early years of the 20th century, the interest of studying the Antarctic territories increased. Some of these expeditions asked permission from the government of Chile to be performed, among which one can highlight the Swedish teacher Otto Nordenskjöld in 1902 and the British teacher Robert F. Scott in 1900. Chile also gave mining permits, as conferred on December 31, 1902, Decree No. 3310 by Pedro Pablo Benavides to lease the Diego Ramírez Islands and San Ildefonso, may extend fishing south indefinitely on condition to install a naval station in the islands.

On May 8, 1906, the Whaling Society of Magallanes was created with a base in Punta Arenas, which was authorized on December 1 to settle in the South Shetland Islands by Decree No. 1314 of the governor of Magallanes, which they did in Whalers Bay on Deception Island, there hoisted the Chilean flag and installing a coal deposit. That place was visited by Jean-Baptiste Charcot in December 1908 to replenish coal and continued to be inhabited in summer season until 1914.

From 1906, they began to be promulgated several decrees, even from the National Congress of Chile, for mining permits in the Antarctic area. The Minister of Foreign Affairs of Chile mentioned on September 18, Chilean national day, of that year, the Chilean Antarctic rights in a memory and said that the delimitation of the territory would be subject to preliminary investigations. Argentina formally protested the June 10, 1907, for these actions in Chile and a negotiation process began for the mutual recognition of Antarctic territories. A limit was to be set to define two different areas, but this treaty was never signed.

On July 21, 1908, the United Kingdom officially announced its claim to sovereignty over all lands within the meridians 20° and 80° south of parallel 50°, in 1917 was moved to 58° south and in 1962, to the parallel 60° south.

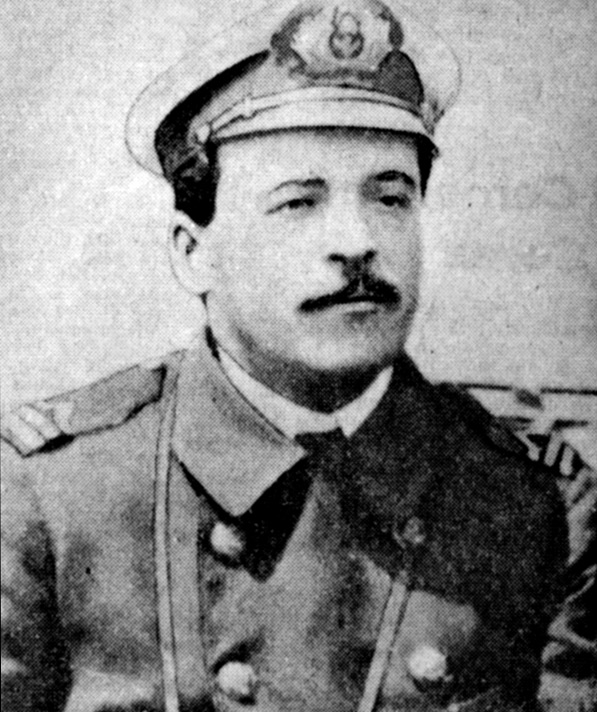
Luis Pardo Villalón

In 1914, the British Ernest Shackleton began an expedition to cross the South Pole from the Weddell Sea to Ross Sea. With two ships, Endurance and Aurora, he went to Antarctica, but the weather worsened dramatically until an iceberg sank the Endurance. Shackleton then sailed to Argentine ports, the Falklands and South Georgia Islands without finding anyone willing to join the expedition trapped on an Antarctic island. In Punta Arenas, however, he found the pilot Luis Pardo Villalón, who, while aboard the Yelcho, managed to rescue those shipwrecked on the Elephant Island. On September 4, 1916, they were received at the port of Punta Arenas as heroes. The Pilot Pardo feat, sailing with temperatures close to −30 °C (−22 °F) and a stormy sea of icebergs, made him win national and international recognition.

On January 14, 1939, Norway declared its territorial claims on Antarctic territory between meridians 0° and 20° (Queen Maud Land), which alarmed the Chilean government, so the president Pedro Aguirre Cerda encouraged the definition of National Antarctic Territory and the September 7 of that year established by Decree No. 1541 a special commission to examine the country's interests in Antarctica.

The commission set the bounds according to the Theory of polar areas taking into account geographical, historical, legal and diplomatic precedents, which were formalized by Decree No. 1747, enacted on November 6, 1940, and published on June 21, 1955. As in Chile is considered their Antarctic rights arrived until the line Treaty of Tordesillas, the decree setting the limit of his claim in a meridian located further west (the 53° West), his claim to not include the South Orkney Islands in consideration of the rights of Argentina. (Note: Some Chilean nationalist sources say that Chile resigned a third of its Antarctic sector in favor of Argentina, without explaining where to take the data, which the Tordesillas line passing through the meridian 37° 7'West however, classically it considered that Spain stood at 46° 37 'West.)

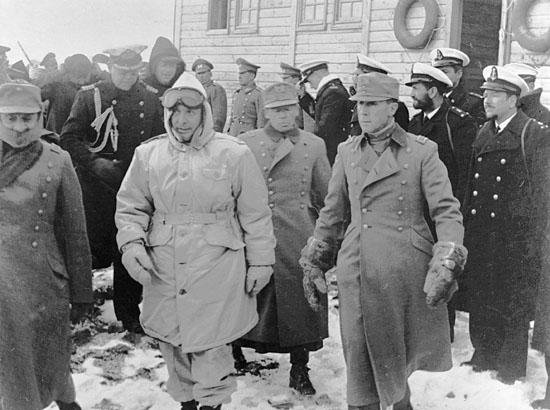
Gabriel González Videla inaugurating the Base General Bernardo O'Higgins Riquelme in Antarctica in 1948

Chile began to perform acts of sovereignty in the Antarctic continent with installation, Sovereignty Base current Arturo Prat in 1947. The following year, and as a way of settling the Chilean claims, the President Gabriel Gonzalez Videla opened the Base General Bernardo O'Higgins Riquelme, the first official visit of Head of state to Antarctica.

Law No. 11486 of June 17, 1955 added the Chilean Antarctic Territory to the Province of Magallanes, which became on July 12, 1974, the XII Region of Magallanes and Chilean Antarctica.

In 1958, the president of the US Dwight Eisenhower invited Chile to the Conference by the International Geophysical Year to resolve the issue Antarctic. On 1 December 1959, Chile signed the Antarctic Treaty which freezes (but doesn't derogate) all the territorial claims in the continent, ensuring each signatory nation to a status quo for the duration of the treaty.

== Consequences ==
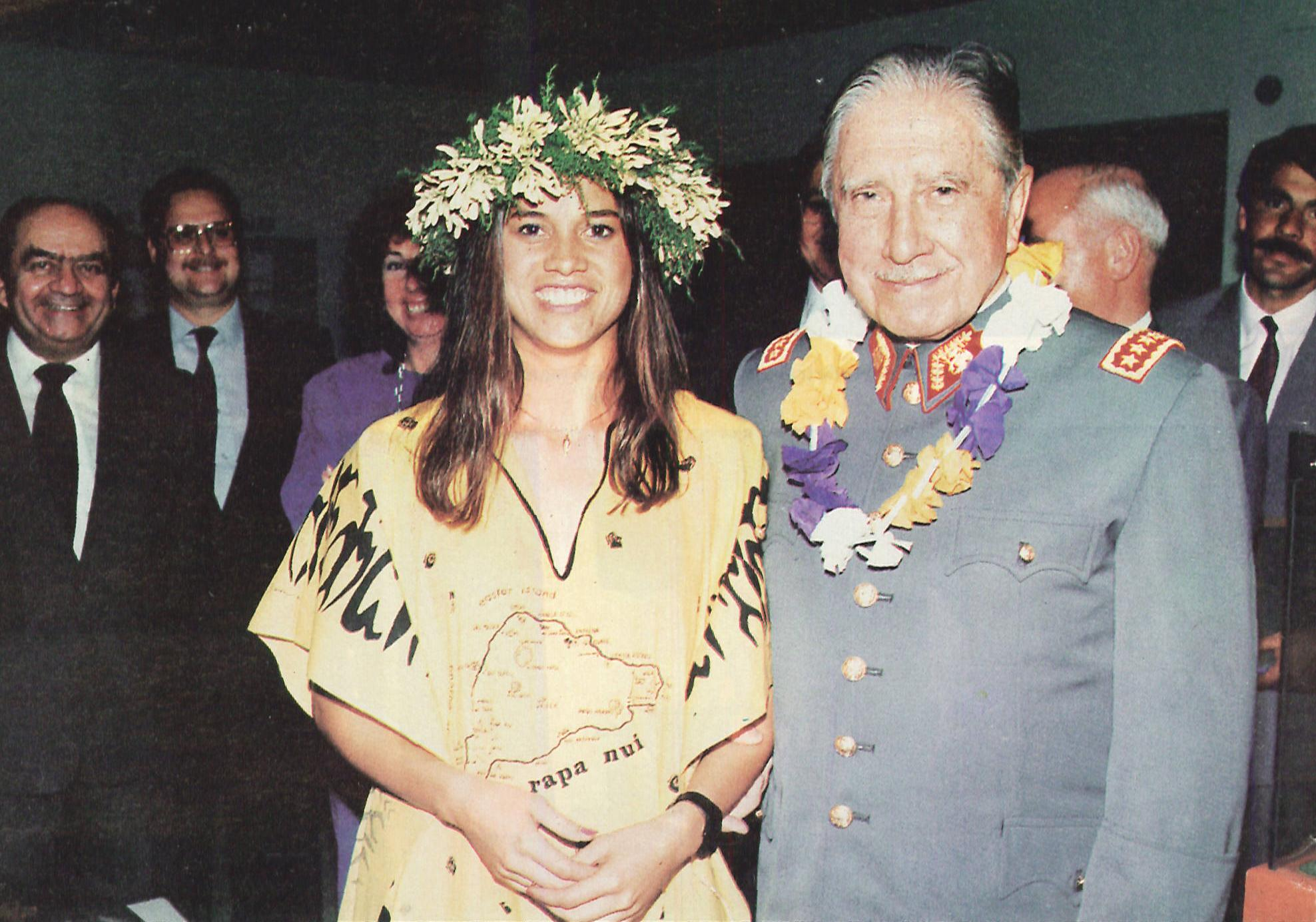
General Pinochet posing with a native Rapa Nui woman

In 1978, amid direct negotiations attempting to settle the Beagle conflict, Chilean Dictator Augusto Pinochet assured that Chile had no expansionist intentions, but that his government would "defend the patrimony that belongs to it by right".

In the late 19th and early 20th centuries, Chile temporarily resolved its border disputes with Argentina with the Puna de Atacama Lawsuit of 1899 and the Cordillera of the Andes Boundary Case, 1902.

Chile's rise as a major geopolitical power in the South Pacific also had the consequence of placing it in direct confrontation with the United States.

== Criticism ==
According to Chilean diplomat Juan Salazar Sparks, the political theories of Andrés Bello and Diego Portales were neither expansionist nor interventionist; rather, he argues, they believed that Chile's status as a maritime nation and its role as a promoter of Pan-Americanism rested on its moral leadership, cultural influence, and success in maintaining the regional balance of power. Moreover, he considers that Chile was forced into wars with Peru and Bolivia in order to protect the regional balance of power, and that the country's participation in the Chincha Islands War is evidence of its commitment to Pan-Americanism. Chilean researcher Felipe Sanfuentes also argues that Chile was not an expansionist country and considers that this perspective is promoted by Argentine irrendentism over Tierra del Fuego and Patagonia.

== See also ==
- American imperialism
- Anti-Chilean sentiment
- Argentine–Chilean boundary dispute
- East Patagonia, Tierra del Fuego and Strait of Magellan dispute
- Chilenization
- Expansionist nationalism
- Lebensraum

== Bibliography ==
- Barros, Mario (1970). Historia Diplomática de Chile (in Spanish) (2 ed.). Santiago: Editorial Andres Bello. ISBN 956-13-0776-6.
- Burr, Robert (1974). By Reason Or Force: Chile and the Balancing of Power in South America, 1830-1905. Berkeley: University of California Press. ISBN 0-520-02629-2.
- Carmona, Guillermo Lagos (1980). Los titulos historicos (in Spanish). Andres Bello.
- Delsing, Riet (2012). "Issues of Land and Sovereignty: The Uneasy Relationship Between Chile and Rapa Nui". In Mallon, Florencia (ed.). Decolonizing Native Histories. Durham, North Carolina: Duke University Press. ISBN 9780822351528.
- Kurtz, Marcus J. (2013). Latin American State Building in Comparative Perspective. New York: Cambridge University Press. ISBN 978-0-521-74731-8.
- Rauch, George (1999). Conflict in the Southern Cone. Westport, Connecticut: Praeger Publishers. ISBN 0-275-96347-0.
- Resende-Santos, João (2007). Neorealism, states, and the modern mass army. New York: Cambridge University Press. ISBN 978-0-521-86948-5.
- Saavedra-Rivano, Neantro (1993). "Chile and Japan: Opening Doors through Trade". In Stallings, Barbara; Szekely, Gabriel (eds.). Japan, the United States, and Latin America. London: The Macmillan Press Ltd. ISBN 978-1-349-13130-3.
- Salazar Sparks, Juan (1999). Chile y la Comunidad del Pacífico (in Spanish). Santiago: Editorial Universitaria. ISBN 956-11-1528-X.
- Sanfuentes, Felipe (1992). "The Chilean Falklands Factor". In Danchev, Alex (ed.). International Perspectives on the Falklands Conflict. New York: St. Martin's Press. ISBN 978-0-312-07189-9.
- Sater, William (1990). Chile and the United States: Empires in Conflict. Athens, GA: University of Georgia Press. ISBN 0-8203-1249-5.
- Sicker, Martin (2002). The Geopolitics of Security in the Americas. Westport, Connecticut: Praeger Publishers. ISBN 0-275-97255-0.
