= List of regions of Peru by GDP =

This is a list of Regions of Peru by GDP and GDP per capita.

== List of regions by GDP ==
Regions by GDP in 2015 according to data by the OECD.

Rank	Region	GDP in mil PER	GDP in mil USD (PPP)
1	Lima Region	306,331	124,869
2	Arequipa Region	78,739	35,708
3	La Libertad Region	91,860	20,442
4	Piura Region	26,595	17,352
5	Cusco Region	23,126	15,089
6	Ica Region	21,301	13,898
7	Áncash Region	20,568	13,420
8	Junín Region	18,071	11,791
9	Cajamarca Region	15,763	10,285
10	Lambayeque Region	15,547	10,144
11	Puno Region	13,556	8,844
12	Loreto Region	10,713	6,990
13	San Martín Region	8,049	5,252
14	Moquegua Region	7,931	5,175
15	Ayacucho Region	7,538	4,919
16	Huánuco Region	7,494	4,889
17	Tacna Region	7,063	4,608
18	Ucayali Region	5,918	3,861
19	Pasco Region	5,749	3,751
20	Huancavelica Region	4,640	3,028
21	Amazonas Region	4,258	2,779
22	Apurímac Region	3,897	2,543
23	Madre de Dios Region	3,459	2,257
24	Tumbes Region	3,422	2,233
	Peru	602,527	393,125

== List of regions by GDP per capita ==
Regions by GDP per capita in 2014 according to data by the OECD.

Rank	Region	GDP per capita in PER	GDP per capita in USD (PPP)
1	Lima Region	47,246	31,181
2	Moquegua Region	29,535	19,492
3	Ica Region	26,258	17,329
4	Arequipa Region	23,994	15,835
5	Tacna Region	20,527	13,547
6	Madre de Dios Region	20,234	13,354
7	Cusco Region	18,743	12,370
8	Pasco Region	18,677	12,326
9	Áncash Region	16,694	11,017
10	La Libertad Region	15,194	10,027
11	Tumbes Region	14,766	9,745
12	Piura Region	14,356	9,474
13	Junín Region	11,795	7,784
14	Lambayeque Region	11,483	7,578
15	Ucayali Region	11,223	7,407
16	Loreto Region	10,818	7,139
17	Ayacucho Region	10,209	6,737
18	Cajamarca Region	10,102	6,667
19	Amazonas Region	9,790	6,461
20	Puno Region	9,437	6,228
21	Huancavelica Region	9,070	5,986
22	San Martín Region	8,904	5,876
23	Apurímac Region	7,865	5,191
24	Huánuco Region	7,821	5,162
	Peru	18,523	12,225
