= Exercise Paddington Diamond =

Joint Bolivian-British-Swiss scuba diving expedition to Lake Titicaca

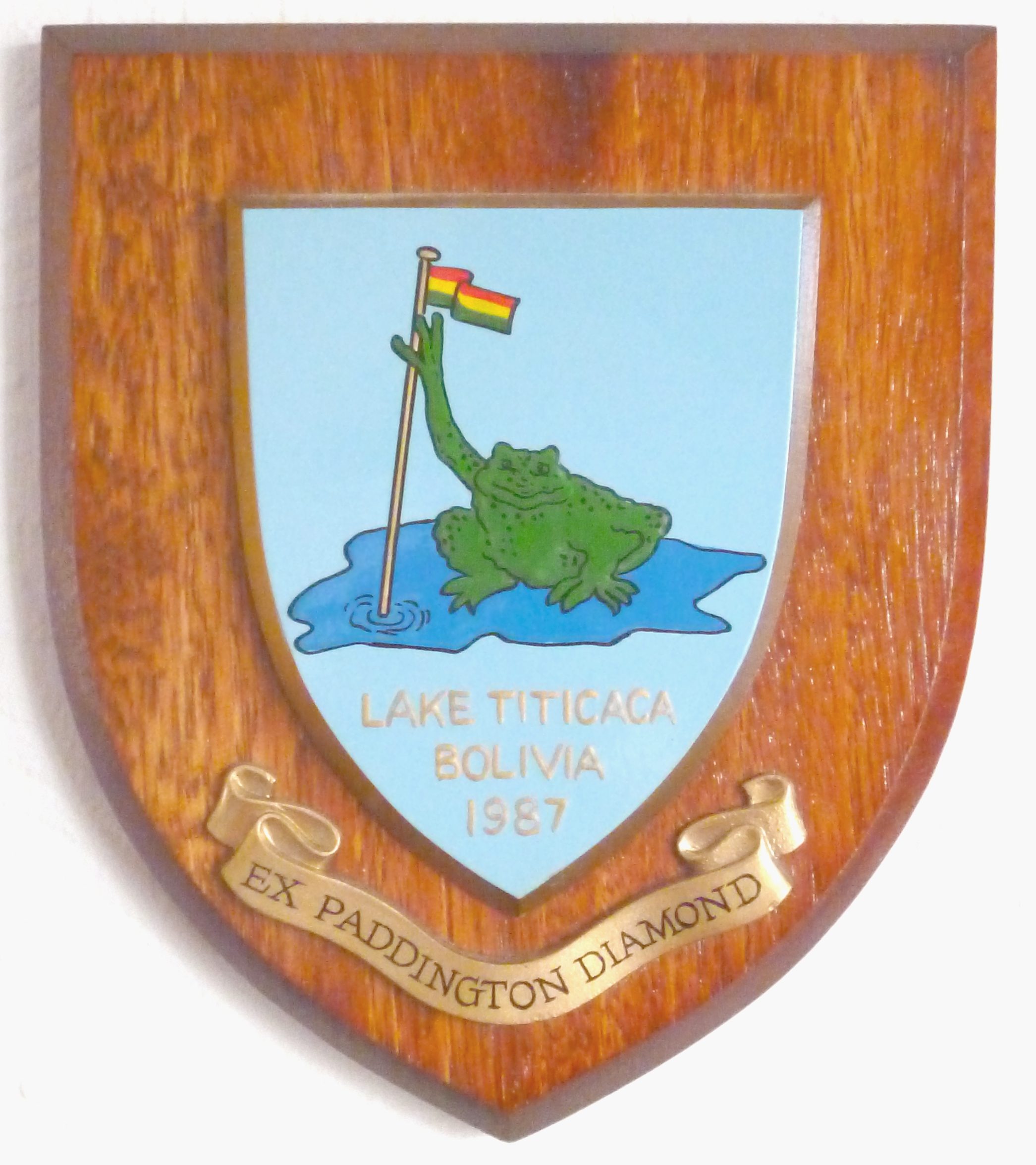
Exercise Paddington Diamond

Exercise Paddington Diamond was a joint Bolivian-British-Swiss scuba diving expedition to Lake Titicaca in 1987.

== Background ==
In early 1987, the British Army of the Rhine (BAOR) arranged a group of adventure training exercises for military personnel in the high Andes of Peru and Bolivia. These exercises were identified by the group name ‘Paddington’ (a reference to Paddington Bear, a fictional children's character created by author Michael Bond and said to be from Peru). Under that umbrella were a number of expedition groups pursuing different activities: hiking, caving etc. The designations identifying individual groups were ‘Paddington’ followed by the name of a geometric shape. (Note: As was usual for BAOR exercises.) The caving group in Peru was ‘Paddington Triangle’. The diving expedition to the Bolivian waters of Lake Titicaca was Paddington Diamond.

Exercise Paddington Diamond was a collaborative venture hosted by the Bolivian Navy (Note: Armada Boliviana.) out of their San Pedro naval base in the Strait of Tiquina, Lake Titicaca. This is the highest navigable lake in the world at an altitude of 3,810 m (12,500 feet). The Bolivian Navy had a history of diving in the lake and wished to keep up to date its understanding of the technical and medical aspects of diving at such extreme altitudes. The purpose of Exercise Paddington Diamond was to work with the navy to test under field conditions the latest generation of dive computers and the high altitude decompression algorithms they used. In line with this objective Professor Albert Bühlmann of the University of Zürich, the world's leading expert on diving at altitude, provided the expedition with new decompression tables for diving up to 4,500m above sea level. Through Professor Bühlmann's contacts with Swiss instrument manufacturers the expedition's two models of diving computer were pre-programmed with these latest calculations. The new tables had been verified in a decompression chamber in Zürich but had not yet been evaluated in open water. (Note: Noted in the interview with Captain Marc Moody RAOC, the BAOR Expedition Leader, in the Services Sound and Vision Corporation film of the expedition)

A subsidiary objective of Paddington Diamond was to use the planned dive programme to increase understanding of the Lake Titicaca environment by conducting underwater surveys of localised regions to seek submerged Inca or other ruins, and by undertaking detailed collections of animal and plant life using the precision only possible with the use of scuba techniques.

The British party comprised diving personnel from a range of British army regiments and from the Royal Air Force but to support the expedition's objectives a number of civilian specialists were also recruited. These included an expert in dive computers and high altitude dive tables from the University of Zürich; a doctor with expertise in diving medicine and a nurse, both from Geneva (to support the Bolivian naval doctor and British army doctor already on the team); an equipment specialist from the British Sub-Aqua Club; and a diver from the Natural History Museum in London as expedition biologist. This took the British/Swiss contingent to 16 individuals.

The Bolivian Navy provided a commanding officer, a physician with expertise in high altitude medicine, four divers, two dive launches with crews, and full logistical support in the form of equipment, security personnel and extensive camp facilities. They also brought local knowledge and public outreach capabilities to the team. (Note: 'Public outreach' is an active engagement with the public to convey information regarding, and generate interest in, what you are doing, while gaining a greater understanding of the public's perceptions and concerns regarding that activity.)

== Timetable ==
After two days of acclimatisation to altitude in La Paz the European members moved up to the lake on 5 May 1987 and joined the navy group who had set up a tented camp on the shore at Santiago de Ojje. Diving commenced the following day and continued up to and including 11 May. In this period there were 34 logged expedition dives varying in depth from 2m to 21.5m and in duration from 4 minutes to 45 minutes. (Note: Total time, surface to surface, not bottom time.) (Note: BAOR pp. 15–21.)

After two rest days, on 14 May the expedition moved to Challa Bay on the Island of the Sun. Diving commenced here on the 15th and continued up to and including 27 May with a rest day on the 21st. At Challa there were 99 logged dives varying in depth from 4m to 38m and in duration from 3 minutes to 66 minutes. (Note: BAOR pp. 22–39. A dive recorded as 82 minutes (BAOR p. 38) included time spent in an air pocket in an underwater cave according to the unpublished report of the expedition’s chaplain. Report seen by the first contributor to this Wikipedia entry.)

== Results ==
=== Primary Objective ===
The dive tables and computers were tested during a range of dive types, after which the two designs of computer were cross referenced and checked against the recommendations of the new Bühlmann tables. Many dives were deliberately planned to employ a rectangular profile, the form best suited to match the assumptions of the calculations and act as a test of the decompression recommendations. Survey and habitat sampling dives differed in that they often began and ended on shore and were not controlled profiles. (Note: i.e. The divers moved freely underwater, changing depth as they followed the contours of the lake bed.) They were also shallower than many of the dives made specifically to test the tables and computers.

After each dive the returning divers were subjected to a regime of medical examinations to check for early signs of nitrogen bubbles forming in the body (the cause of decompression sickness, ‘the bends’). No signs of decompression problems were found.

Following this programme of dives the Bolivian Navy officially adopted the new Bühlmann tables for all diving operations at altitude.

=== Subsidiary objectives ===
No new ruins, structures or Inca artefacts were discovered during the expedition but many scientifically valuable biological collections and observations were made, especially of the smaller amphipod crustaceans of the lake. These were already known to be undergoing active species formation in Lake Titicaca and have the potential to provide valuable information regarding the process of evolution in the lake and, by extension, elsewhere. These collections were returned to the Natural History Museum in London for further study by world experts. (Note: BAOR pp. 59-63)

=== Media ===
Throughout the expedition there had been media coverage in the UK press and on Bolivian television and radio. After the expedition Services Sound and Vision Corporation (SSVC) produced a 20-minute television news documentary about the expedition for broadcast on the British Forces Broadcasting Service (BFBS), which also ran radio items. (Note: e.g. UK newspaper The Daily Telegraph 5 May 1987; Bolivian radio 29 May 1987.)

== First woman to dive in Lake Titicaca? ==
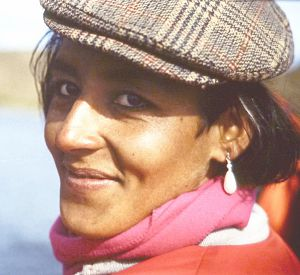
Annie Jean-Alexis in May 1987

On 7 May 1987, the expedition's Swiss nurse Annie Jean-Alexis made a brief 4 minute dive to a depth of 2m, abandoned for technical reasons. Nevertheless, she was possibly the first woman to dive in Lake Titicaca. Two days later she made a more successful descent to a depth of 3m for 15 minutes. (Note: BAOR report pp. 18–19)

Also on 9 May two women dived during a visit by the UK Naval Attaché and his staff. (Note: BAOR report p. 7) As this diplomatic party was not undertaking expedition work dives, the logs for these dives are not reproduced in the published report and the names of the two divers are not recorded there. However, in the unpublished diary of an expedition member it is noted their first names were Sylvia (or Silvia) and Marita. (Note: Diary seen by the first contributor to this Wikipedia entry.) Sylvia/Silvia was a member of the British embassy staff; Marita was a Swedish volunteer worker known to the embassy.

On 17 May, Sarah Last, a PR executive from BAOR, made a 15-minute dive to 6.4m during a visit by a media team from the SSVC who had joined the expedition for several days to produce TV and radio news programmes. (Note: BAOR report p. 26)

Therefore, during Exercise Paddington Diamond at least four women dived with aqualungs in Lake Titicaca and may have been the first four to do so. The Bolivian Navy now trains female military personnel, as well as men, in high altitude diving, equipping them for search and rescue operations in the lake.
