= San Pedro de Tiquina Municipality =

San Pedro de Tiquina
- Municipality
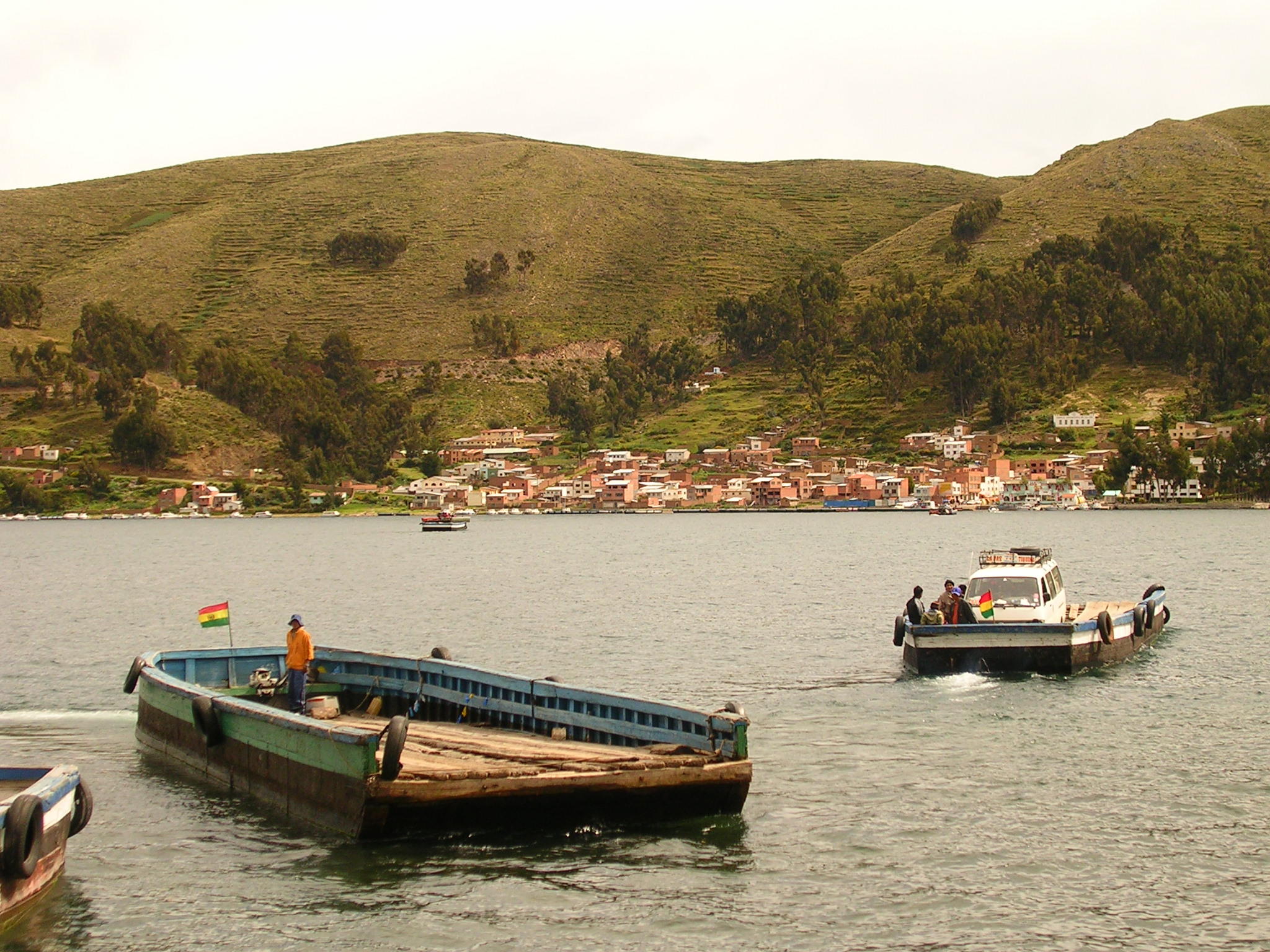
- Strait of Tiquina, Lake Titicaca, Bolivia

- Location of the Arani Municipality within Bolivia
- Coordinates: 16°14′0″S 68°52′0″W
- Country: Bolivia
- Department: La Paz Department
- Province: Manco Kapac Province
- Seat: San Pedro de Tiquina

Government
  - Mayor: Gregorio Argani Quispe
  - President: Freddy Poma Peñaranda

Area
  - Total: 23 sq mi (60 km^{2})
- Elevation: 12,630 ft (3,850 m)

Population (2001)
  - Total: 6,093
  - Ethnicities: Aymara
- Time zone: UTC-4 (BOT)

San Pedro de Tiquina Municipality is the second municipal section of the Manco Kapac Province in the La Paz Department in Bolivia. Its seat is San Pedro de Tiquina.

== Subdivision ==
The municipality is divided into five cantons.

Canton	Inhabitants (2001)	Seat
Calata San Martin Canton	1,282	Calata de San Martin
San Pablo de Tiquina Canton	1,474	San Pablo de Tiquina
San Pedro de Tiquina Canton	839	San Pedro de Tiquina
Santiago de Ojje Canton	516	Santiago de Ojje
Villa Amacari Canton	1,982	Villa Amacari

== The people ==
The people are predominantly indigenous citizens of Aymaran descent.

Ethnic group	%
Quechua	1.1
Aymara	91.6
Guaraní, Chiquitos, Moxos	0.2
Not indigenous	6.9
Other indigenous groups	0.2

Ref.: obd.descentralizacion.gov.bo

== Languages ==
The languages spoken in the San Pedro de Tiquina Municipality are mainly Aymara and Spanish.

Language	Inhabitants
Quechua	114
Aymara	4,884
Guaraní	3
Another native	8
Spanish	4,440
Foreign	41
Only native	1,409
Native and Spanish	3,518
Only Spanish	924

== See also ==
- Strait of Tiquina
