= Bolivia–Chile relations =

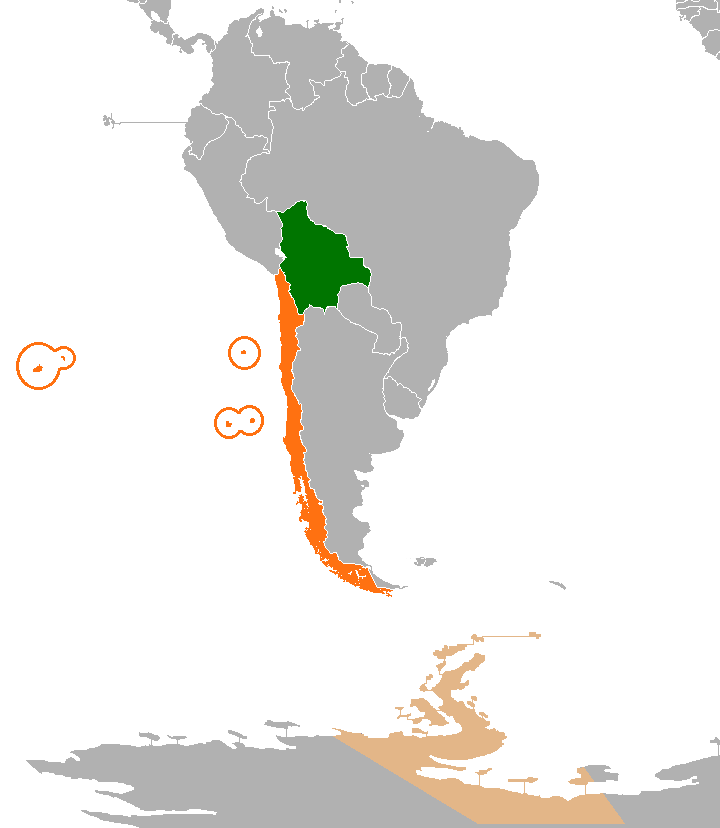
- Bolivia: Chile

Diplomatic mission
- Bolivian consulate-general in Santiago: Chilean consulate-general in La Paz

International relations between the Republic of Chile and the Plurinational State of Bolivia have been complex ever since independence in the early 19th century because of the Atacama border dispute. Relations soured even more after Bolivia lost its coast to Chile during the War of the Pacific and became a landlocked country (Bolivia still claims a corridor to the Pacific Ocean). Chile and Bolivia have maintained only consular relations since 1978, when territorial negotiations failed and Bolivia decided to sever diplomatic relations with Chile. However, in spite of the strained relationship, Chile and Bolivia still have economic treaties supporting tourism and cooperation; therefore, trading between two nations is not affected by the territorial dispute.

Throughout history, these two South American countries have had strained relations since independence in the early 19th century, due to the dispute over the Atacama Corridor. Relations became particularly tense after Bolivia lost its coastline to Chile at the end of the 19th century during the War of the Pacific, becoming a landlocked country. However, Bolivia continues to claim a sovereign outlet to the Pacific Ocean. Today, the two countries share a border extending 942 kilometers.

With the assumption of office by Michelle Bachelet in Chile, relations improved; however, in 2012 the territorial dispute became more serious, and in 2013 the then Bolivian president Evo Morales brought a case against Chile before the International Court of Justice, initiating a new period of tension between the two countries. This process concluded in 2018 with a ruling unfavorable to Bolivia, dismissing any obligation on the part of the Chilean state to enter into negotiations.

== Historical relations ==
=== Relations following independence from Spain (1818-1828) ===
When Chile and Bolivia gained independence from Spain in 1818 and 1825 respectively, both countries established their borders using the uti possidetis principle. The origins of the dispute came from the borders established in the Spanish Empire that just defined the Atacama desert as the northern border of the Captaincy General of Chile. Bolivian and Chilean historians disagree on whether the territory of Charcas, originally part of the Viceroyalty of Peru, later of the Viceroyalty of the Río de la Plata and ultimately of Bolivia, included access to the sea. Supporting their claims with different documents, Bolivians claim that it did, while Chileans disagree. When Simón Bolívar established Bolivia as a nation in 1825, he claimed access to the sea at the port of Cobija, disregarding overlapping claims by Chile, which claimed that it bordered Peru at the Loa River and that Bolivia was therefore landlocked.

=== Santa Cruz and the War of the Confederation (1829-1839) ===
Andrés de Santa Cruz became President of Bolivia in 1829 and intervened militarily in Peru, leading to the creation of the Peru-Bolivian Confederation in 1836. Chilean minister Diego Portales perceived the confederation as a threat to Chilean interests and the balance of power in the region. Chile declared war in 1836 followed by Argentina in 1837; both countries were supported by Peruvian dissidents. The war began with victories by the Confederation over its enemies. A turning point took place on the fields of Paucarpata where the Peru-Bolivian Confederation led by Santa Cruz forced the Chilean and Peruvian rebel armies to sign the peace treaty known as the Paucarpata Treaty, which included their unconditional surrender; later this treaty was rejected by the Chilean parliament. The Peruvian rebels and the Chilean army set off on a new campaign against Santa Cruz, defeating the Confederation on the fields of Yungay. The confederation was dissolved in 1839. This was a turning point in Bolivian history because, for nearly 60 years afterwards, coups and short-lived constitutions dominated Bolivian politics.

=== Border and economic treaty (1866-1874) ===
The (north–south) border between Bolivia and Chile as established in the 1866 treaty. The green polygon represents the zone of mutual benefits. Neither Chile’s eastern border nor the other borders had been defined

Bolivian-Chilean national borders had not been agreed upon until 1866, when the two countries had negotiated a treaty that established the 24th parallel south as their boundary. In Chile, the territories recognised as Bolivian on the Pacific coast were seen as ceded, while in Bolivia they were seen as finally recognised by Chile as Bolivian. This treaty also entitled Bolivia and Chile to share tax revenue on mineral exports out of the territory between the 23rd and 25th parallels. The area between the 25th and 23rd parallels would also remain demilitarized. A second treaty in 1874 superseded this, entitling Bolivia to collect full tax revenue between the 23rd and 24th parallels, but fixed tax rates on Chilean companies for 25 years. At the time, most economic exploitation of the coastal region was being conducted by Chilean companies and British interests under the aegis of Chile's more robust economy and more stable institutions. Bolivia subsequently became dissatisfied at the arrangement due to the negative financial status of the national budget, especially after the earthquakes that struck Cobija in 1868 and 1877. This was the only small coastal town founded by Bolivians.

=== War of the Pacific (1879-1904) ===
Borders of Chile, Bolivia and Peru before and after the war. Note: north of Arica is the Peruvian region of Tacna, occupied by Chile from 1880 to 1929.

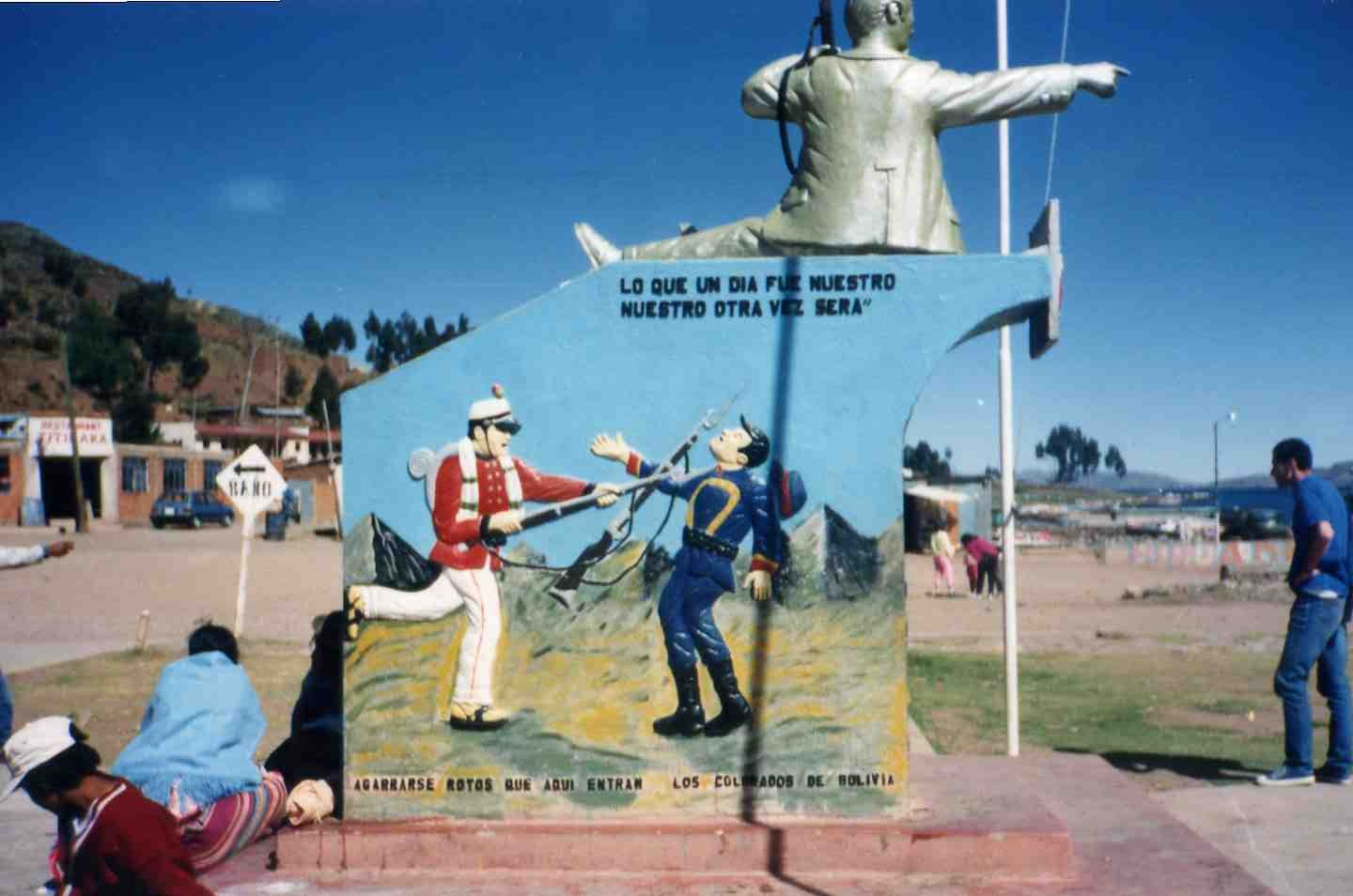
Mural in San Pablo de Tiquina, Bolivia, declaring "What once was ours will be ours again" and "Hold on, rotos (Chileans): here come the Colorados of Bolivia"

In 1879, Bolivian dictator General Hilarión Daza increased the taxes on the exportation of saltpeter in violation of the 1866 treaty. When Chilean-owned saltpeter companies refused to pay, Daza expropriated the companies and sold them in a public auction. Daza then put an end to all commerce with Chile and exiled all Chilean residents in Bolivia (the Bolivian port of Antofagasta had more Chileans than Bolivians). In response, Chile declared the border treaties null and reactivated its old claim that Chile had inherited a land border with Peru using the uti possidetis principle. Chile disembarked troops at Antofagasta the day of the auction. Later, Chile declared war on Bolivia and occupied Bolivia's coast. Peru had, in 1873, signed a secret pact with Bolivia in which the two countries agreed to fight together against any nation that threatened either of them. When Peru refused to be neutral in the conflict between Chile and Bolivia, Chile declared war on Peru. Chile defeated both countries and annexed the coast claimed by Bolivia. This was ratified by Peru in the Treaty of Ancón (1883) and by Bolivia in a Treaty of Peace and Friendship signed in 1904.

=== Further negotiations (1964-1978) ===
Diplomatic relations with Bolivia continued to be strained because of Bolivia's continuing aspiration to have access to the sea. In 1964, Bolivian President Víctor Paz Estenssoro severed diplomatic relations with Chile. Generals Augusto Pinochet and Hugo Banzer resumed diplomatic relations and attempted to settle the territorial disputes. Secret negotiations started in 1973, and in 1975 diplomatic relations between Chile and Bolivia were established. That year, Pinochet and Banzer met in the Bolivian border town of Charaña. Pinochet agreed to give Bolivia a small strip of land running between the Chilean city of Arica and the Peruvian border. However the Treaty of Lima between Peru and Chile specified that Chile must consult Peru before granting any land to a third party in the area of Tarapacá. Peruvian President General Francisco Morales Bermúdez did not agree with the Charaña proposal and instead drafted his own proposal, in which the three nations would share administration of the port of Arica and the sea immediately in front of it. Pinochet did not agree to this proposal, and Banzer broke ties with Chile again in 1978. The failure of the Charaña accords was one of the reasons for Banzer's downfall that very year.

== Since the 1990s ==
=== Bolivian gas conflict ===
In early 2002, the administration of President Jorge Quiroga proposed to build a pipeline through neighboring Chile to the port of Mejillones, the most direct route to the Pacific Ocean to export Bolivia's newly discovered gas reserves. However, antagonism towards Chile ran deep in Bolivia because of the loss of Bolivia's Pacific coastline to Chile in the War of the Pacific (1879–1884).

Bolivians began campaigning against the Chilean option, arguing instead that the pipeline should be routed north through the Peruvian port of Ilo, 260 km further from the gas fields than Mejillones, or, better yet, first industrialised in Bolivia. According to Chilean estimates, the Mejillones option would be $600 million cheaper. Peru, however, claimed the difference in cost would be no more than $300 million. Bolivian proponents of the Peruvian option said it would also benefit the economy of the northern region of Bolivia through which the pipeline would pass.

Supporters of the Chile pipeline argued that US financiers would be unlikely to develop processing facilities within Bolivia. Meanwhile, the Peruvian government, eager to promote territorial and economic integration, offered Bolivia a special economic zone for 99 years for exporting the gas at Ilo, the right of free passage, and the concession of a 10 km^{2} area, including a port, that would be exclusively under Bolivian administration. President Jorge Quiroga postponed the decision shortly before leaving office in July 2002 and left this highly contentious issue to his successor. It was thought that Quiroga did not want to jeopardize his chances of re-election as president in the 2007 elections.

After winning the 2002 presidential election, Gonzalo Sánchez de Lozada expressed his preference for the Mejillones option but made no "official" decision. Despite this, a consortium called Pacific LNG was formed to exploit the newly discovered reserves. The consortium comprised the British companies BG Group and BP, and Spain's Repsol YPF. Repsol is one of three companies that dominate the gas sector in Bolivia. The other two are Petrobras and Total. A plan costing US$6 billion was drawn up to build a pipeline to the Pacific coast, where the gas would be processed and liquefied before being shipped to Mexico and the United States (Baja California and California) through a Chilean port, for example Tocopilla. Lozada's 2003 deal was heavily opposed by Bolivian society, in part because of nationalistic resentment against Chile, and the Gas War led to Lozada's resignation in October 2003.

Lozada's successor, Carlos Mesa, held a gas referendum with the question: "Do you agree with President Carlos Mesa's policy of using gas as a strategic resource to achieve a sovereign and viable route of access to the Pacific Ocean?" The referendum was approved with 54.79% of the votes saying "yes". Mesa even took the question about a sea access to the OAS where he had a discussion with Chilean president Ricardo Lagos, who said that it was a bilateral topic. Mesa resigned following the 2005 Hydrocarbons Law.

Evo Morales, who was elected president in 2005, is strongly opposed to having a foreign consortium export Bolivia's natural gas without processing it domestically. He argued it should be used domestically to help Bolivia, the poorest country in South America.

Chile and Bolivia maintain consular relations and appear to have become friendlier. Former Chilean President Ricardo Lagos attended the inauguration of Bolivian President Evo Morales. In 2015, Morales announced his intention to establish conditional diplomatic relations with Chile in order to achieve Bolivia's aspiration for sovereign access to the Pacific Ocean via Chilean land. Chile, on the other hand, wants unconditional diplomatic relations.

The dispute with Chile was taken to the International Court of Justice. The Court ruled in support of the Chilean position, and declared that although Chile may have held discussions about a Bolivian corridor to the sea, the country was not required to negotiate one or to surrender its territory.

=== Agenda of the 13 points ===
The agenda of thirteen points (Agenda de los trece puntos) represented an important milestone in diplomatic relations between Bolivia and Chile. It was agreed upon in 2006 during the administrations of Michelle Bachelet and Evo Morales with the aim of promoting improved relations between the two countries.

Both governments set out to seek solutions to the following challenges:

- Development of mutual trust
- Border integration
- Free transit
- Physical integration
- Economic complementarity
- Maritime issue
- Silala and water resources
- Instruments to combat poverty
- Security and defense
- Cooperation to control illicit trafficking of drugs and essential chemicals and precursors
- Education, science, and technology
- Cultures
- Other issues

Some of these points were addressed until 2010, but in 2013 Bolivia unilaterally brought the case of the Dispute over Maritime Negotiations before the International Court of Justice. Subsequently, in 2018, Chile submitted the Dispute over the Silala Waters to the same court.

=== Cases before the International Court of Justice (2013–2022) ===
Between 2013 and 2022, Chile and Bolivia maintained disputes before the International Court of Justice. The first case concerned the negotiation of access to the sea, and the other related to the waters of the Silala.

In 2021, the representations of Bolivia and Chile agreed to move forward with a roadmap.

=== Dispute over maritime negotiations (2013–2018) ===
On 24 April 2013, the government of Bolivia formally initiated proceedings before the International Court of Justice, filing a claim requesting that Chile negotiate a sovereign access to the sea. On 15 April 2014, the Plurinational State of Bolivia submitted its memorial.

Bolivia’s agent before the Court was former president Eduardo Rodríguez Veltzé, while the agent of the Republic of Chile was Ambassador Felipe Bulnes. On 29 April, former Bolivian president Carlos Mesa was appointed by President Evo Morales as international representative of the maritime claim. His task was to explain the motivations and details of the Bolivian claim before multilateral organizations and governments around the world.

On 23 May, Chilean Foreign Minister Heraldo Muñoz stated that there was a possibility of challenging the jurisdiction of the International Court of Justice in The Hague regarding Bolivia’s claim for access to the sea.

On 1 October 2018, the International Court of Justice (ICJ) issued its ruling, rejecting all of Bolivia’s arguments aimed at obliging Chile to return to the negotiating table.

In its judgment, the ICJ found no basis for establishing the existence of an obligation on Chile to negotiate this issue with Bolivia. The decision was adopted by 12 votes in favor and 3 against on 1 October 2018, declaring that Chile does not have, and will not have, an obligation to engage in negotiations regarding Bolivia’s maritime claim. With this ICJ ruling, Bolivia’s legal aspirations to regain access to the sea came to an end.

=== Dispute over the Silala waters (2016–2022) ===
On 6 June 2016, Chile filed a lawsuit before the International Court of Justice regarding the Silala waters. On 1 December 2022, the ICJ issued its ruling.

=== State visit in 2026 ===
In October 2026, Chilean President José Antonio Kast met Bolivian President Rodrigo Paz in La Paz, meaning Chile’s president made first state visit to Bolivia in 71 years. The previous Chilean president to make an official visit to Bolivia was Carlos Ibáñez del Campo in 1955.

== Economic relations ==
In 2023, trade between the two countries amounted to 1.648 billion USD, representing an average annual growth of 6.9% over the past five years. The main products exported by Chile were distilled fuel oils (gasoil, diesel oil), while Bolivia mainly exported soybean oilcake meals.

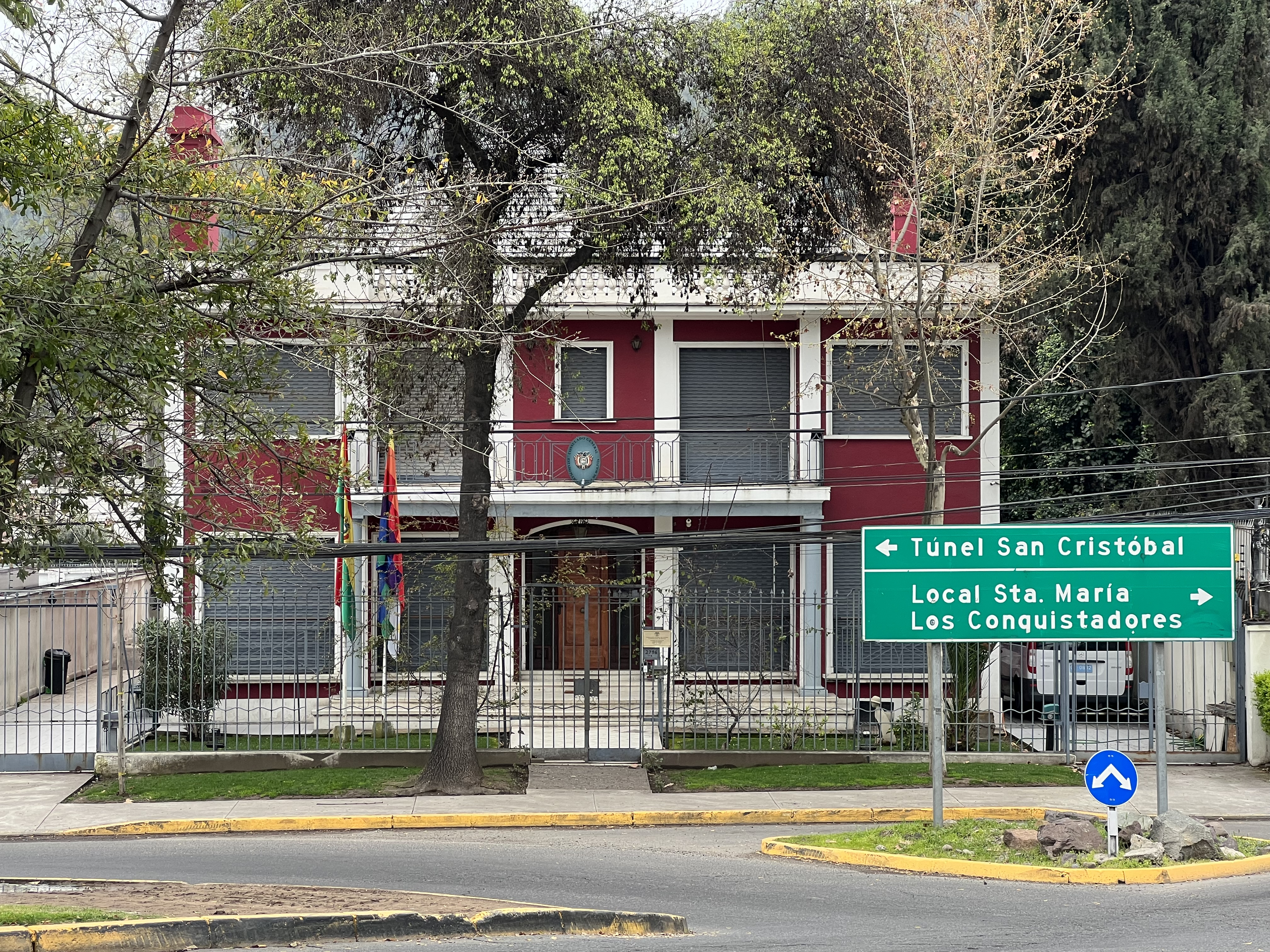
Consulate-General of Bolivia in Santiago

== Resident diplomatic missions ==
- Bolivia has consulates-general in Santiago and Arica and consulates in Antofagasta, Calama and Iquique.
- Chile has consulates-general in La Paz and Santa Cruz de la Sierra.

== See also ==
- Landlocked country
- Puna de Atacama Lawsuit
- Foreign relations of Bolivia
- Foreign relations of Chile
