= Arica–La Paz railway =

International railway line between Chile and Bolivia

Overview
- Native name: Ferrocaril de Arica-La Paz
- Locale: Chile, Bolivia

History
- Opened: 1913

Technical
- Line length: 440 km (273 mi)
- Number of tracks: Single track with passing loops
- Rack system: Strub between Puquios and Central until 1968
- Track gauge: 1,000 mm (3 ft 3 3/8 in) metre gauge
- Highest elevation: 4,257 m (13,967 ft)
Route map
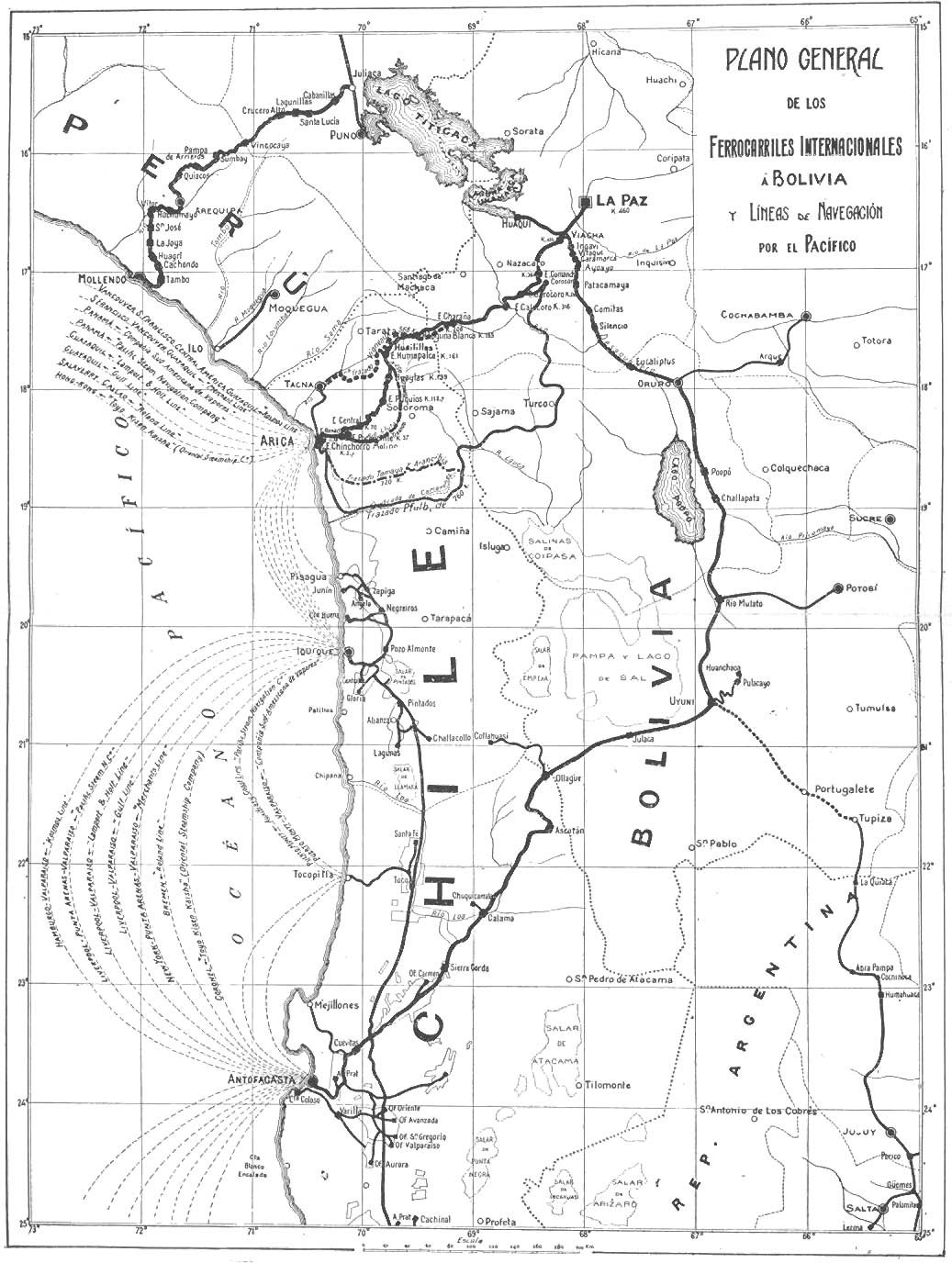

The Arica–La Paz railway or Ferrocarril de Arica–La Paz (FCALP) is a railway built by the Chilean government under the Treaty of Peace and Friendship of 1904 between Chile and Bolivia. It was inaugurated on 13 May 1913 and is the shortest line from the Pacific Coast to Bolivia. It is 440 km (273 mi) long, of which 233 km (145 mi) is in Bolivian territory. The Railway is meter gauged. Until 1968, it was rack worked over a 43 km section, on the Chilean side, between Central and Puquios. The line reaches a height of 4257 meters above sea level at General Lagos. The Chile - Bolivia border is crossed between the stations of Visviri and Charaña. When the railway is in operation, it is used for the export of Bolivian minerals and some agricultural production as well as the import of merchandise into Bolivia.

Construction was started by the Chilean Sindicato de Obras Públicas, then continued under direct Chilean government supervision and was completed by the British company Sir John Jackson (Chile) Ltd., which carried out the major part of the work. It has 7 tunnels.

The length of the Arica–La Paz railway is shorter than the other two alternatives:

- from La Paz via Lake Titicaca to Mollendo in Peru is 520 mi (837 km), including a 150 mi (241 km) train ferry journey across Lake Titicaca.
- from La Paz to Antofagasta is 711 mi (1,144 km).

Apart from some 18 months in 2001 and 2002, when the line was cut by damage to bridges, the railway was in service until 2005 when the company operating it filed for bankruptcy. Between 2010 and 2012, the contractor Comsa, hired by the Arica port authority EPA, rehabilitated the infrastructure and removed soil contaminated by lead and other mineral residues from land surrounding the railway in Arica, especially in the Chinchorro freight yard. Work undertaken by Comsa has included laying 67 km of rail on 73 000 timber sleepers to enable freight trains to operate at up to 40 km/h. The total cost of the rehabilitation was estimated at $US 45m. By the Railway's centenary, 13 May 2013, the line was in operational order all the way up to the frontier with Bolivia; the Bolivian section had remained in a serviceable condition, being used by a local rail-bus service. Trial trains have been run over the line.

In 2013 it was not clear when the Arica–La Paz railway might reopen to regular train services. The passenger service closed in 1996 due to a lack of demand and trucks rather than trains carry most of the cargo traffic along paved highways. Political relations between Chile and Bolivia are poor.

The Chilean State Railways' original plan was to tender the operation of the line, but this relied on the success of a tender to repair the best of the existing locomotives. In 2013, Chilean State Railways did not have any operable locomotives on the line. As a result, the revised proposal was to allow technically qualified operators to run trains over the railway, using their own equipment. The most likely interested party was supposed to be Bolivia's Andina Railway (EFASA), which connects with Arica–La Paz railway at the border between the stations of Visviri and Charaña and has well-equipped workshop facilities at Viacha, not far from La Paz. Efasa is administered by Bolivian Railway Investors, a subsidiary of Antofagasta PLC, which owns the railway from the frontier between Abaroa and Ollagüe down to the Chilean Pacific coast ports of Antofagasta and Mejillones.

A further proposal to reopen the railway was made in 2017, and passenger service offered on a short stretch of 38 km. In May 2021 freight traffic operated again from the Chilean coast until the terminal near La Paz in Bolivia.

== See also ==
- Treaty of Peace and Friendship of 1904 between Chile and Bolivia
- Ferrocarril de Antofagasta a Bolivia
