= Bolivian Navy =

- Armada Boliviana
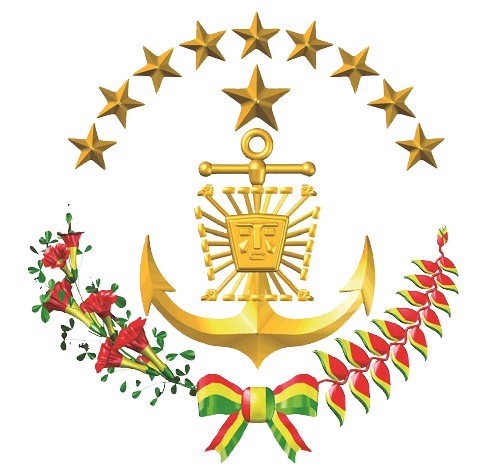
- Naval emblem of Bolivia
- Founded: January 1963 (as the River and Lake Force); January 1966 (current form)
- Country: Bolivia
- Type: Brown-water navy
- Part of: Armed Forces of Bolivia
- Patron: Our Lady of Copacabana

Insignia
- Naval ensign

- Naval jack

The Bolivian Navy (Spanish: Armada Boliviana) is a branch of the Armed Forces of Bolivia. As of 2018, the Bolivian Navy had approximately 5,000 personnel. Although Bolivia has been landlocked since the War of the Pacific and the Treaty of Peace and Friendship (1904), Bolivia established a River and Lake Force (Fuerza Fluvial y Lacustre) in January 1963 under the Ministry of National Defense. It consisted of four boats supplied from the United States and 1,800 personnel recruited largely from the Bolivian Army. The Bolivian Navy was renamed the Bolivian Naval Force (Fuerza Naval Boliviana) in January 1966, but it has since been called the Bolivian Navy (Armada Boliviana) as well. It became a separate branch of the armed forces in 1963. Bolivia has large rivers which are tributaries to the Amazon which are patrolled to prevent smuggling and drug trafficking. Bolivia also maintains a naval presence on Lake Titicaca, the highest navigable lake in the world, which the country shares with Peru.

Landlocked Bolivia has not reconciled with the loss of its coast to Chile, and the Navy exists to keep the hope alive of recovering its coast by cultivating a maritime consciousness. The Bolivian Navy takes part in many parades and government functions, but none more so than the Día del Mar (Day of the Sea) in which Bolivia, every year, re-vindicates its claim for an unspecified sovereign access to the sea.

Bolivia claims the country had access to the sea at independence in 1825. In the Boundary Treaty of 1866 between Chile and Bolivia the involved parties agreed on a border line that established a sea access for Bolivia recognized by Chile. In the War of the Pacific (1879–1883) Chile defeated Peru and Bolivia, and conquered the Litoral Department which included all of the Bolivian coastline. The recovery of its coast is a matter of honor in Bolivia, influencing many modern-day political actions and trade decisions.

In 2010, Peru granted Bolivia "dock facilities, a free-trade zone and space for economic activities" along with the option to "build a Pacific Coast annex for the Bolivian navy school" in a 99-year deal.

== Organization ==
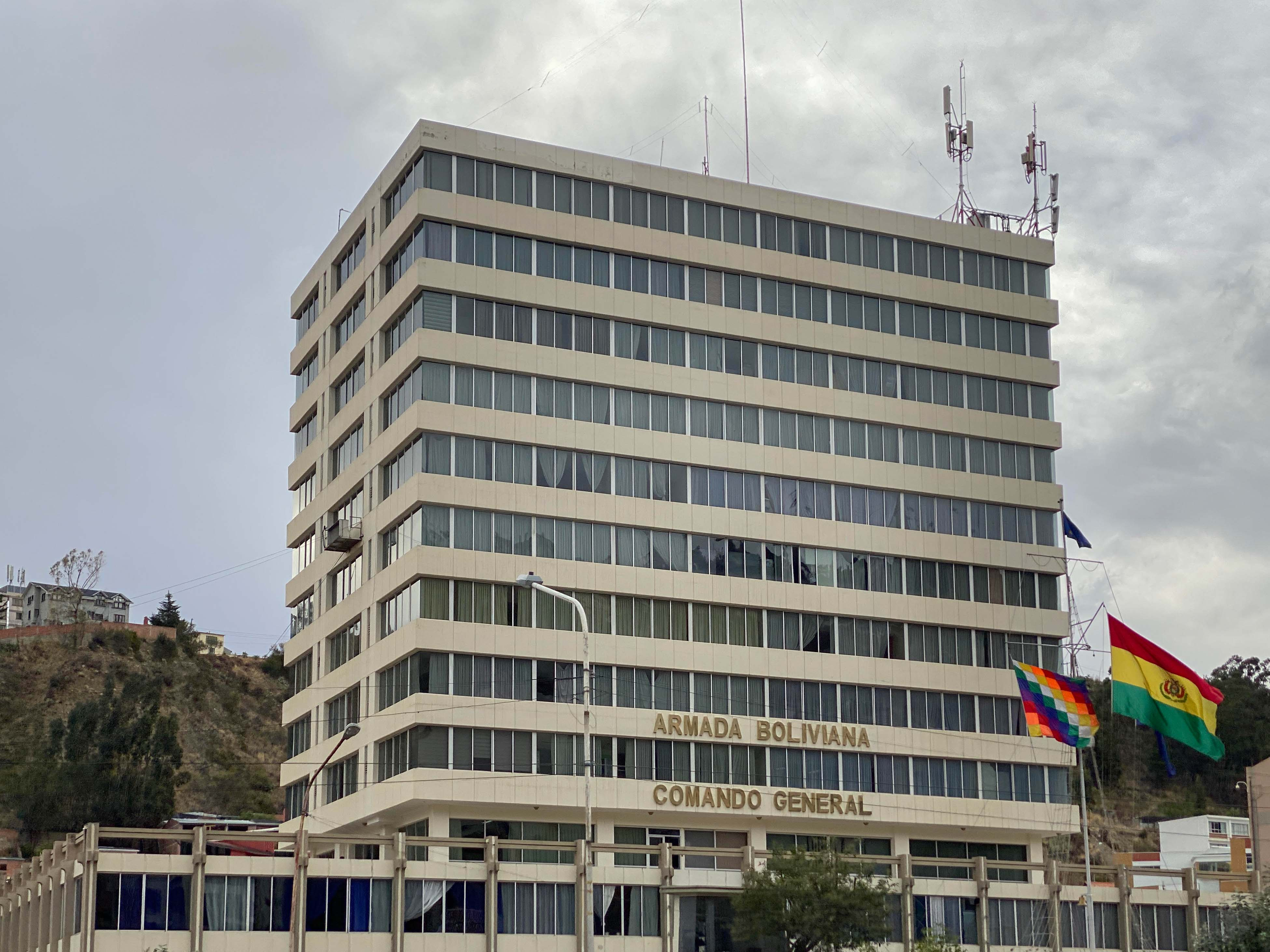
The General Command of the Bolivian Navy in La Paz.

The Navy is organized into ten naval districts with flotilla headquarters in Guaqui, Guayaramerín, Puerto Suárez, Riberalta, and San Pedro de Tiquina and bases in Puerto Busch, Puerto Horquilla, Puerto Villarroel, Trinidad, and Rurrenabaque.

Naval vessels include several dozen boats, a dozen or more of which are for riverine patrol. Seagoing vessels, including the American-made PR-51 Santa Cruz de la Sierra and several other vessels sail the oceans with the Bolivian flag with the granted permission of the "Capitanias Navales" Naval Registration Office. The Libertador Simón Bolívar, a ship acquired from Venezuela, used to sail from its home port in Rosario, Argentina on the River Paraná. In 1993 the Navy was formally renamed the Naval Force (Fuerza Naval) and moved with the Bolivian Army and Air Force as service branches of the Armed Forces of Bolivia.

Most of the officers attend the Bolivian Naval Academy, graduating with a Bachelor of Science in Military and Naval Science, accredited by the Military University. Many naval officers later go on to further studies at the undergraduate and graduate level. Argentina's Naval Military Group in Bolivia advises on naval strategy and tactics. Many Bolivian officers train in ocean sailing on Argentinian seagoing naval ships. The Force has several Special Operations units to address both internal and external threats.

The Naval Force covers the extensive Bolivian inland waterways divided between the following Naval Districts which are named after the basin or region where they operate:

  - DN1 First Naval District "BENI" —— (DN1 Primer Distrito Naval "BENI")
  - DN2 Second Naval District "MAMORA" —— (DN2 Segundo Distrito Naval- "MAMORE")
  - DN3 Third Naval District "MADERA" —— (DN3 Tercer Distrito Naval "MADERA")
  - DN4 Fourth Naval District "TITICACA" —— (DN4 Cuarto Distrito Naval "TITICACA")
  - DN5 Fifth Naval District "SANTA CRUZ DE LA SIERRA" —— (DN5 Quinto Distrito Naval "SANTA CRUZ DE LA SIERRA")
  - Sixth Naval District DN6 "COBIJA" —— (DN6 Sexto Distrito Naval "COBIJA")

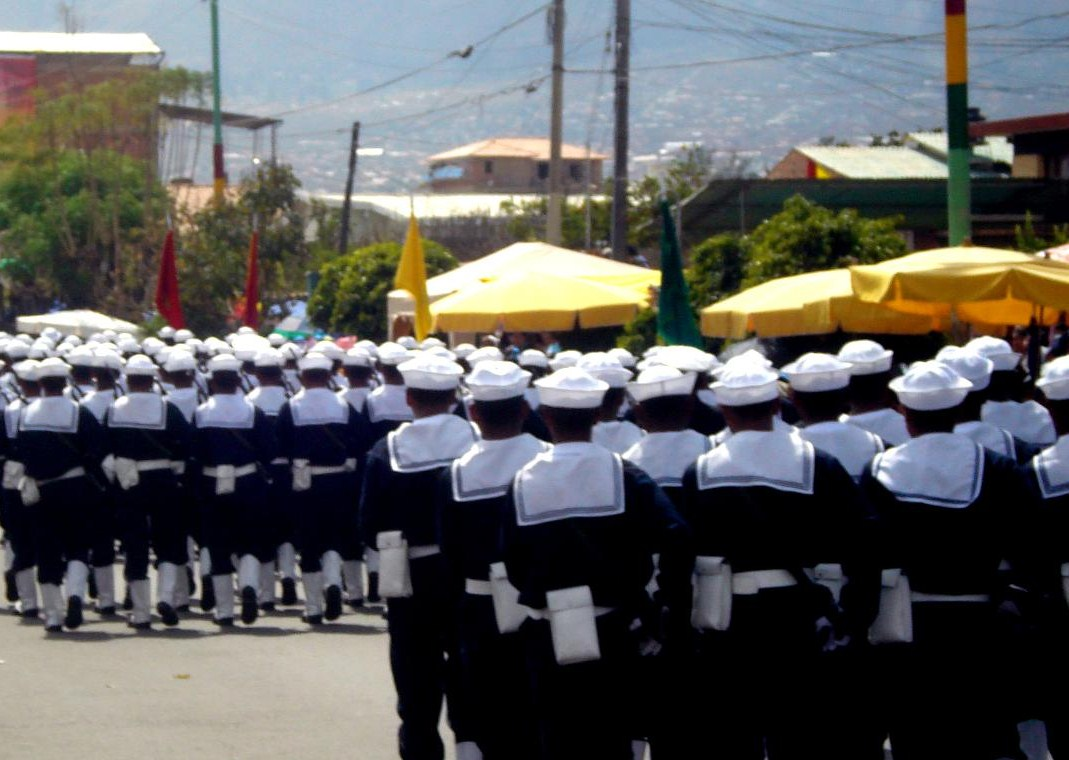
Bolivian marines marching in Cochabamba.

  - The Naval Service Areas:
    - AN 1 "COCHABAMBA" —— (AN 1 "COCHABAMBA")
    - AN 2 "SANTA CRUZ" —— (AN 2 "SANTA CRUZ")
    - AN 3 "BERMEJO" —— (AN 3 "BERMEJO")
    - AN 4 "LA PAZ" —— (AN 4 "LA PAZ")
  - Special Operation capable units:
    - Task Force "Blue Devils" —— (Fuerza de Tarea "Diablos Azules")
    - SINDA Naval Intelligence Service of the Bolivian Navy —— (Servicio de Inteligencia Naval)
    - Immediate Response Group GRIN —— (Grupo de Reacción Inmediata GRIN)
    - The High Altitude Diving Training Center —— (El Centro de Instrucción de Buceo en Altura)
    - Command Training Center Amphibians

=== Marine Corps ===
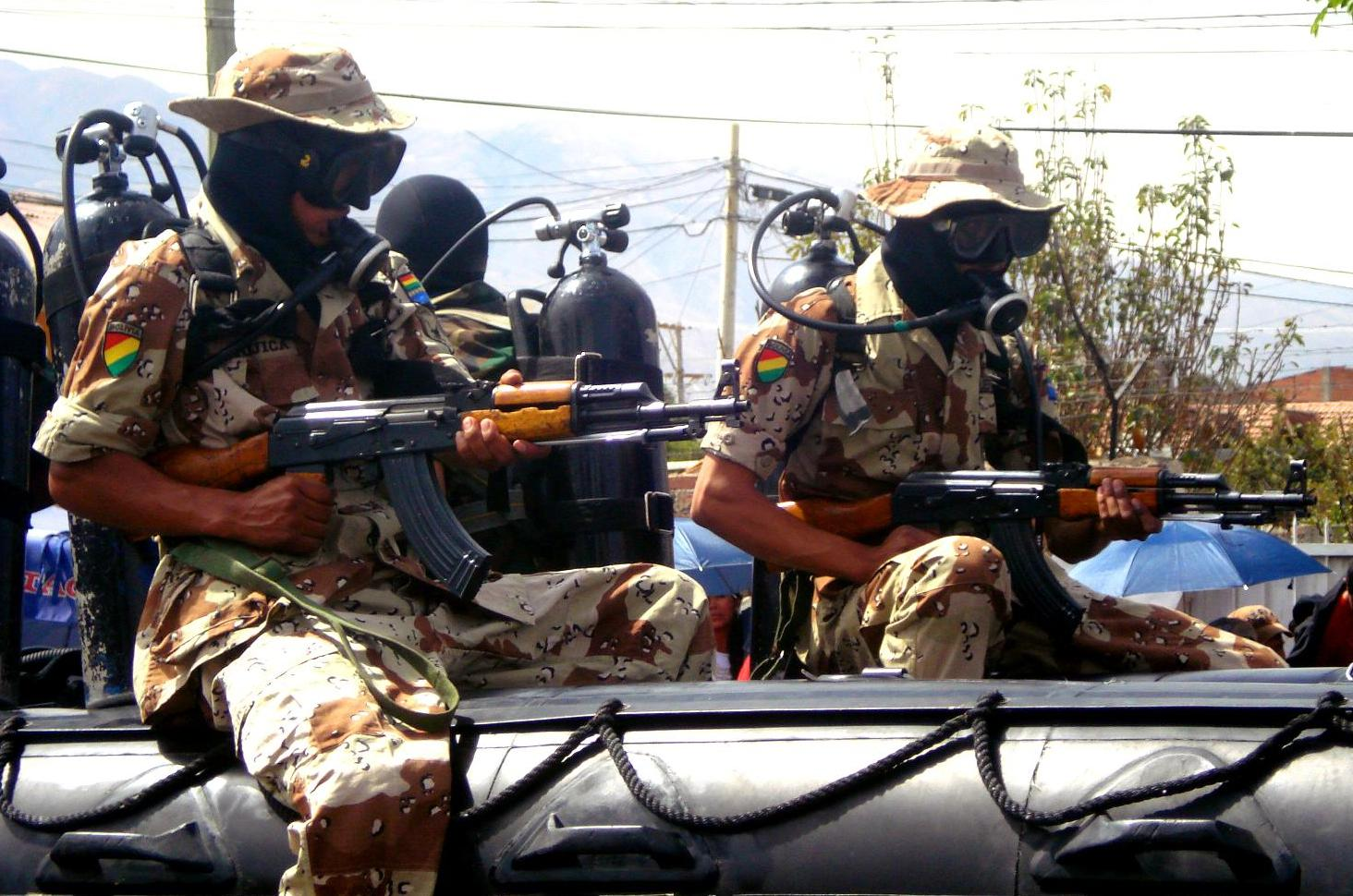
Bolivian naval infantry on top of inflatable boats.

The Marine component of the FNB originated with the creation of the Marine Battalion Almirante Grau in the early 1980s. This force consisted of 600 men based on Tiquina Naval Base on Lake Titicaca. The name was later changed to Marine Battalion Independence, based in Chua Cocani (Not to be confused with the Independence Regiment (RI17) of the Bolivian army).

At present this marines maintain a similar number of troops including paramilitaries. Marine personnel are either part of Task Force Blue Devils or are stationed in various naval bases. There are currently seven infantry battalions which are distributed as follows:

- First Naval District "BENI" —— (Primer Distrito Naval "BENI")
  - I Marine Battalion "Bagué" —— (Batallón de Infantería de Marina I "Bagué")
- Second Naval District "MAMORA" —— (Segundo Distrito Naval "MAMORE")
  - II Marine Battalion "Tocopilla" —— (Batallón de Infantería de Marina II "Tocopilla")
- Third Naval District "MADERA" —— (Batallón de Infantería de Marina II "Tocopilla")
  - III Marine Battalion "Mejillones" —— (Batallón de Infantería de Marina III "Mejillones")
- Fourth Naval District Titicaca —— (Batallón de Infantería de Marina III "Mejillones")
  - IV Marine Battalion "Alianza" —— (Batallón de Infantería de Marina IV "Alianza")
  - VI Mechanized Marine Battalion "Independence" —— (Batallón de Infantería de Marina Mecanizada VI "Independencia")
- Fifth Naval District "SANTA CRUZ DE LA SIERRA" —— (Quinto Distrito Naval "SANTA CRUZ DE LA SIERRA")
  - V Marine Battalion Calama —— (Batallón de Infantería de Marina V "Calama")
- Sixth Naval District "COBIJA" —— (Sexto Distrito Naval "COBIJA")
  - VII Marine Battalion "Columna Porvenir" —— (Batallón de Infantería de Marina VII "Columna Porvenir")
- National Marine Security Corps

==== Naval Military Police ====
The Policía Militar Naval or PMN is a speciality similar to its counterpart to the Army's Military Police, carrying out operations such as Important Persons Protection (IPP), Physical Security (SEF), or Patrol Facility (PAT) with additional duties such as Signals or naval protocol. The principal component are four police battalions:

- AN 4 "La Paz" —— 4th Naval Area
  - 1st Naval Police Battalion —— (Batallón de Policía Militar Naval N° 1)
- AN 1 "COCHABAMBA" —— AN 1 "Cochabamba"
  - 2nd Naval Police Battalion "Quiver" —— (Batallón de Policia Militar Naval N° 2 "Carcaje")
- AN 2 "SANTA CRUZ"—— AN 2 "SANTA CRUZ"
  - 3rd Naval Police Battalion —— (Batallón de Policía Militar Naval N° 3)
- Fourth Naval District Titicaca —— (Cuarto Distrito Naval "TITICACA")
  - 4th Naval Police Battalion —— (Batallón de Policía Militar Naval N° 4)

Alongside the battalions are a number of MP companies in various naval bases.

== Current status ==
Regaining access to the South Pacific Ocean is seen as part of the national narrative for Bolivia. However, aspirations to negotiate access to the ocean with Chile ultimately failed following an International Court of Justice ruling. Sailors of the Bolivian Navy yearn for access to the sea and describe its current navy as experiencing locked-in syndrome (enclaustramiento). Despite this, the Bolivian Navy extensively patrols Lake Titicaca and 5,000 miles of navigable rivers, intercepting smugglers, delivering supplies to remote rural areas and rescuing people and livestock during floods. In addition to local duties, the Bolivian Navy trains with the Argentine Navy and has taken part in United Nations peacekeeping operations in Haiti.

== Equipment ==
=== Watercraft ===
The Bolivian Navy has a total of 173 vessels with many stationed on Lake Titicaca:

Patrol boats:

- 1 PR-51 (Santa Cruz de la Sierra) Class United States
- 6 Capitan Bretel - Type 928 YC China
- 4 Lake Class
- 38 Boston Whaler Piranha LP

Other ships:

- 8 Boston Whaler Piranha LP riverine assault boats Mk.1
- 3 Servicio Industrial de la Marina (SIMA)-built Riverine hospital ships / 226 ton Plataforma Intinerante de Accin Social con Sostenibilidad PIASS Itinerant platform
- 2 Hydrocarbon transporters
- 2 Tankers
- 1 Transport vessel
- 1 Training ship (Libertador Simón Bolívar) - based on Simón Bolívar (barque)
- 1 55' Hatteras patrol vessel

=== Naval Infantry ===
The Bolivian Naval Force retains about 2,000 naval infantry personnel and marines.

=== Naval Aviation ===
Bolivia's navy operates one utility aircraft for the use of headquarters.

==== Current aircraft ====
Aircraft	Origin	Type	Versions	In service	Notes
Cessna 340	United States	Transport / Utility	340	1	

==== Retired aircraft ====
Cessna 402

== Ranks ==
=== Commissioned officer ranks ===
The rank insignia of commissioned officers.

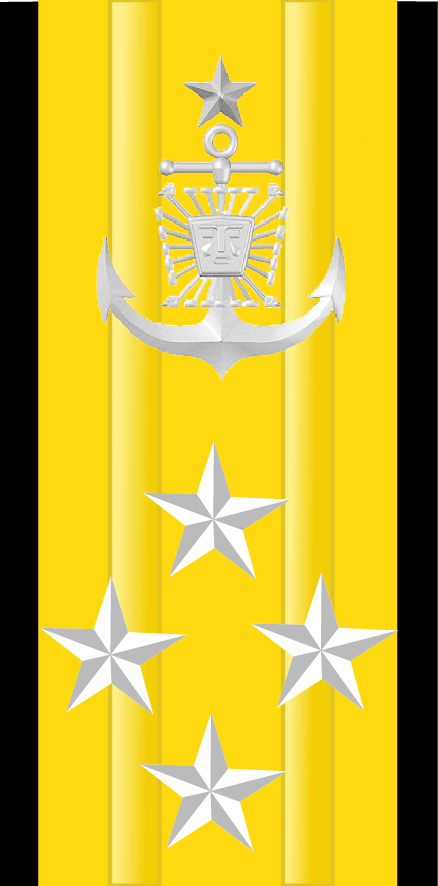
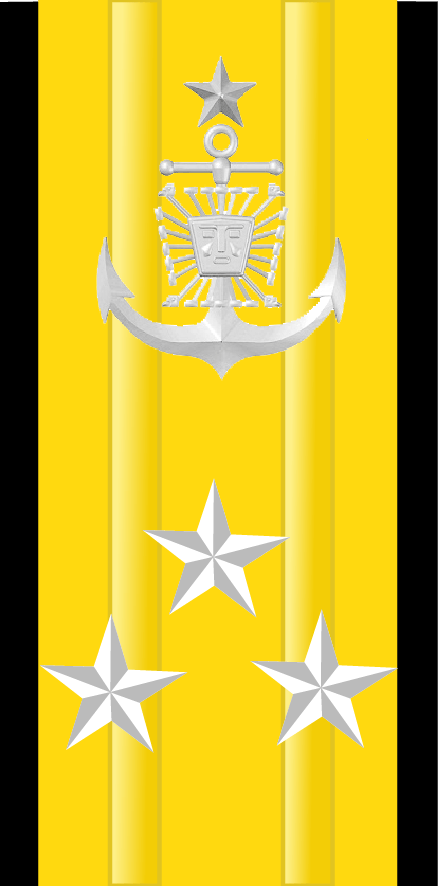
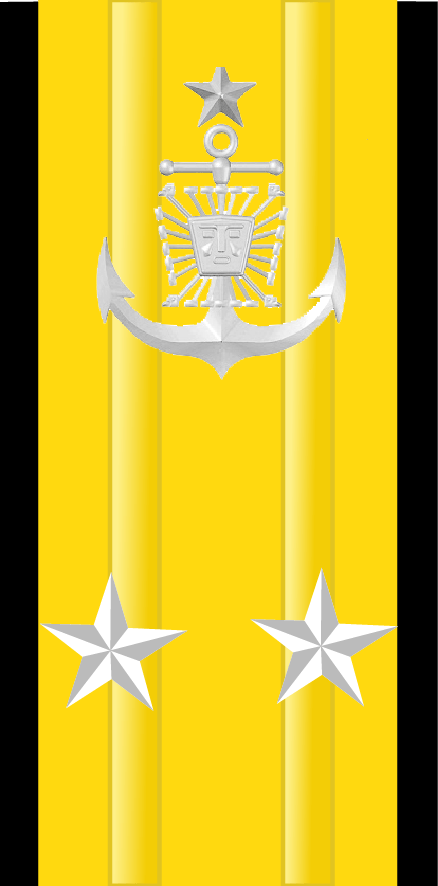
Rank group	General / flag officers			Senior officers			Junior officers
Bolivian Navy
Bolivian Navy	Almirante	Vicealmirante	Contraalmirante	Capitán de navío	Capitán de fragata	Capitán de corbeta	Teniente de navío	Teniente de fragata	Alférez

=== Other ranks ===
The rank insignia of non-commissioned officers and enlisted personnel.

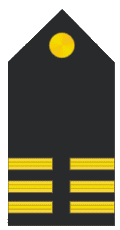
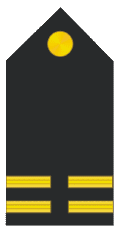
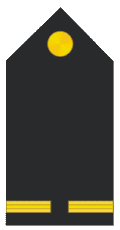
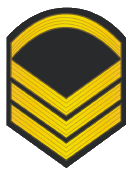
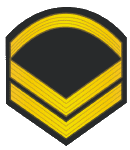
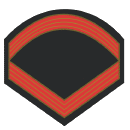
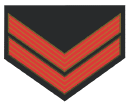
Rank group	Senior NCOs							Junior NCOs		Enlisted
Bolivian Navy											No insignia
Bolivian Navy	Sub-oficial maestre	Sub-oficial mayor	Sub-oficial primero	Sub-oficial segundo	Sub-oficial inicial	Sargento primero	Sargento segundo	Sargento inicial	Cabo conscripto	Marinero de primero	Marinero de segunda

== See also ==
- Atacama border dispute
- Navies of landlocked countries
