= San Pablo de Tiquina =

- Town
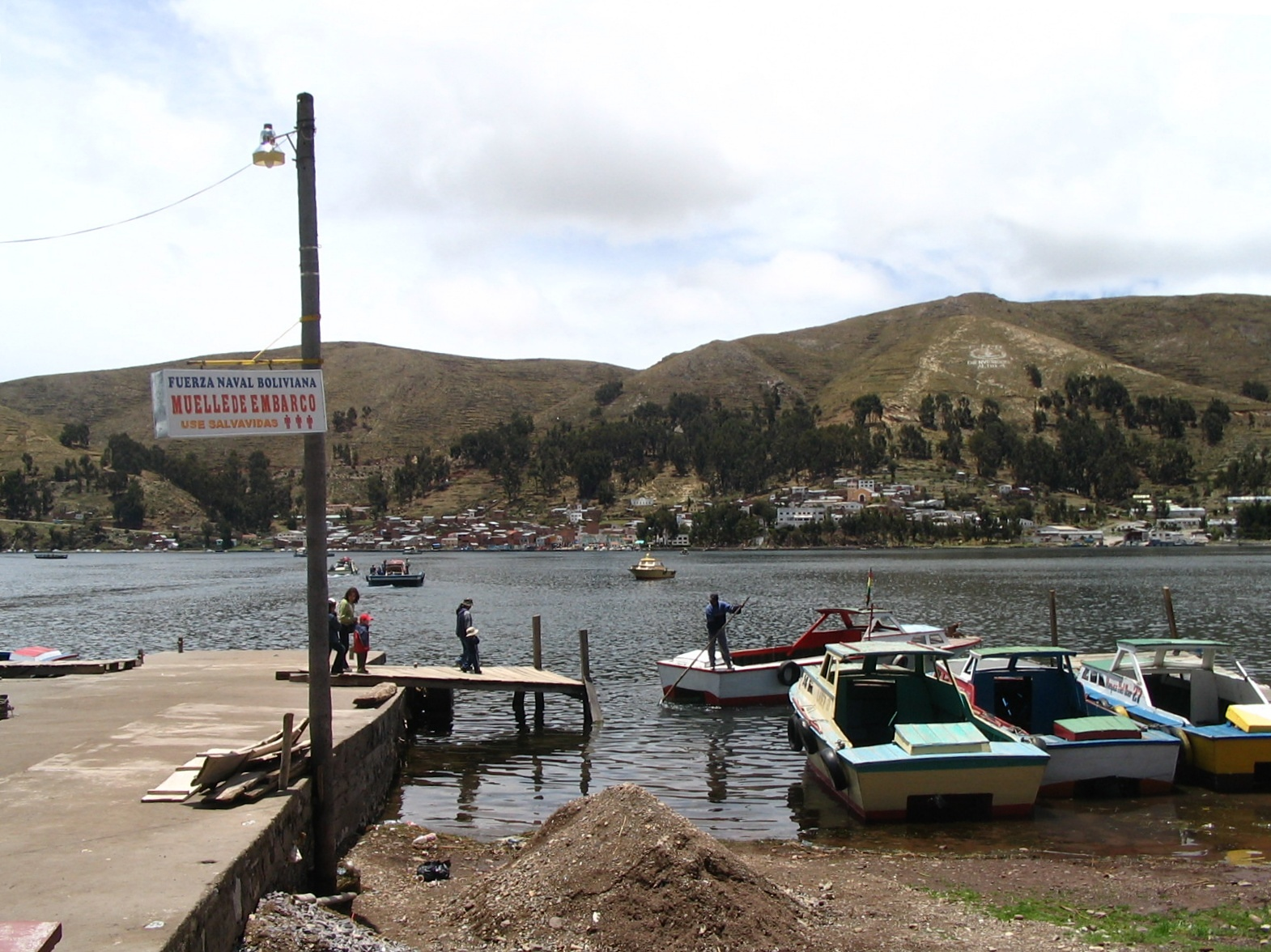
- Strait of Tiquina between San Pedro de Tiquina and San Pablo de Tiquina, Lake Titicaca

- Location within Bolivia
- Coordinates: 16°13′S 68°51′W
- Country: Bolivia
- Department: La Paz Department
- Province: Manco Kapac Province
- Municipality: San Pedro de Tiquina Municipality
- Canton: San Pablo de Tiquina Canton

Population (2001)
  - Total: 944
- Time zone: UTC-4 (BOT)

San Pablo de Tiquina is a small town in the La Paz Department in Bolivia. It is the seat of the San Pablo de Tiquina Canton, one of the five cantons of the San Pedro de Tiquina Municipality, the second municipal section of the Manco Kapac Province.

== See also ==
- Strait of Tiquina
