= Treaty of Peace and Friendship (1904) =

1904 border demarcation treaty between Chile and Bolivia

Treaty of Peace and Friendship between Bolivia and Chile of 1904
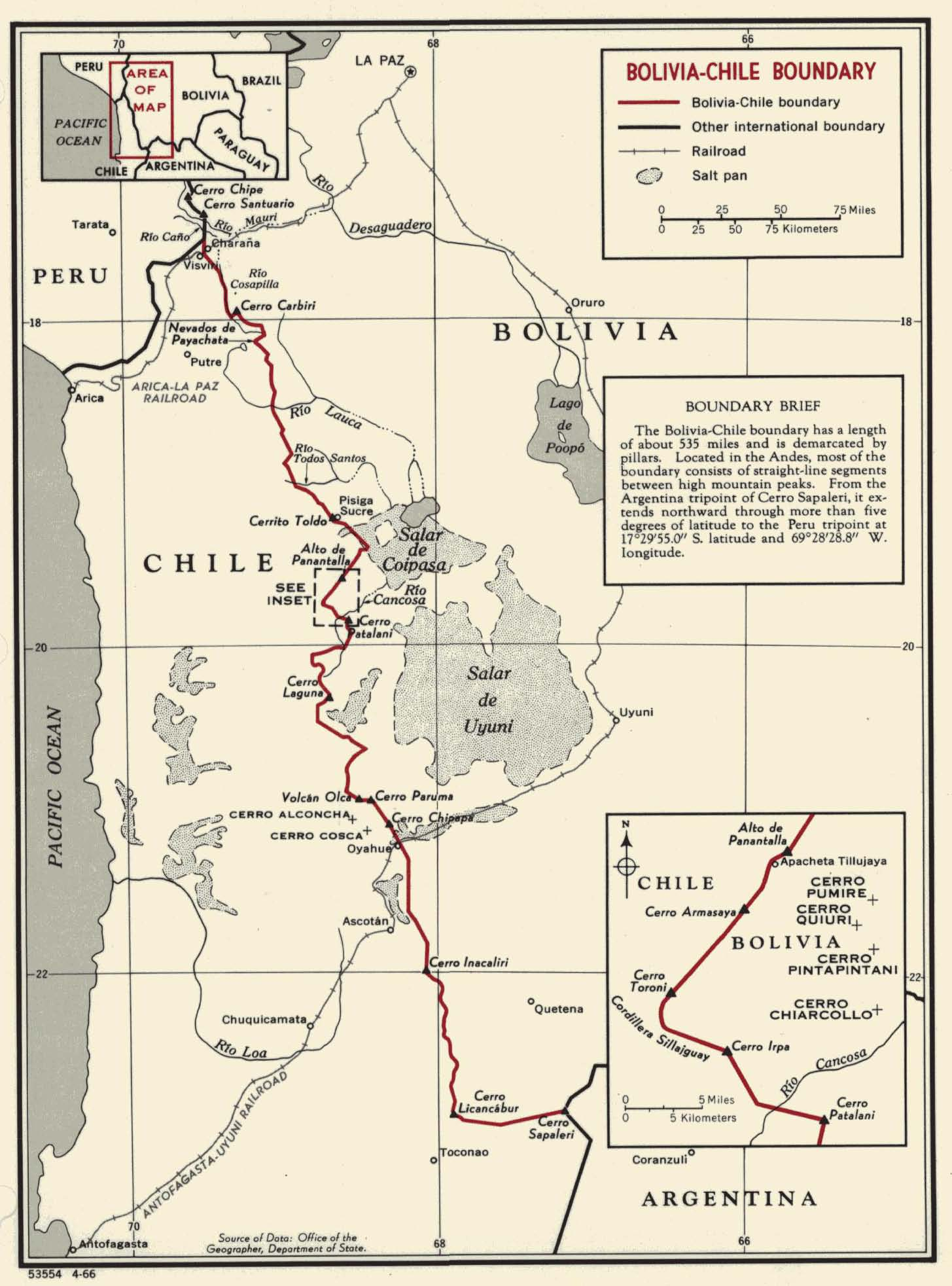
- Chile-Bolivia Border on the map.
- Signed: 20 October 1904
- Location: Santiago de Chile
- Signatories: Bolivia; Chile
- Languages: Spanish

The Treaty of Peace and Friendship of 1904 between Chile and Bolivia was signed in Santiago de Chile on 20 October 1904, to delineate the boundary through 96 specified points between Cerro Zapaleri and Cerro Chipe and to regulate the relations between the two countries 20 years after the end of the War of the Pacific.

The Bolivia–Chile boundary is about 861 kilometres (535 mi) long and is demarcated by pillars in the Andes. Most of the boundary consists of straight lines between high mountain peaks. From the Argentina–Bolivia–Chile tripoint of Cerro Zapaleri, it extends northward through more than five degrees of latitude to the Peru–Bolivia–Chile tripoint at 17° 29' 55.0" S. latitude and 69° 28' 28.8" W. longitude.

== Historical background ==
When Bolivia became independent from Spain on 6 August 1825, it took possession of the territories that corresponded to its colonial administration in accordance with the uti possidetis juris of 1810. Bolivia claimed the maritime territory westward from the Andes to the Pacific Ocean between the Río Salado on the south and the Río Loa on the north, which included part of the Atacama Desert. In 1842 Chile made claims to the desert area following the discovery and exploitation of nitrate deposits. With negotiations extending over a period of several decades, a decision was reached finally between Bolivia and Chile in a treaty dated 10 August 1866.

Article 1 of the treaty of 1866 stated that "the line of demarcation of boundaries between Chile and Bolivia in the desert "shall henceforth be, the parallel of latitude 24 degrees South." On 5 December 1872, a subsequent treaty confirmed the 24th parallel as the boundary between the two states. In accordance with various other treaties, Bolivia was given an equal share of revenues from guano deposits located in Chilean territory between the 24th and 25th parallels; and Chile had the same concession in Bolivian territory between the 24th and 23rd parallels, which area included the port of Antofagasta.

In 1872, the Government of Bolivia granted a concession to a British firm to develop the nitrate deposits in Bolivian territory for a period of 15 years. The secret 1873 Treaty of Defensive Alliance (Bolivia–Peru), called defensive by the signer, was signed at Lima to guarantee the independence, sovereignty, and integrity of their respective territories, but the treaty was kept secret and not communicated to Chile. Therefore, Chile interpreted this pact as a secret alliance against them. In 1878 Bolivia placed a minimum tax on the production of the nitrate firm. In the intervening time, the concession had been transferred to a Chilean company making the leveling of the tax a violation of the treaty of 1866, in which Bolivia had agreed not to increase taxes on the industry without the approval of Chile. Chile asked Peru for a proclamation of neutrality, the latter did not respond, and Chile declared war on both Peru and Bolivia on 5 April 1879, precipitating the so-called War of the Pacific.

The Treaty of Ancón ended the conflict between Peru and Chile on 20 October 1883, and a truce was signed by Bolivia and Chile at Valparaíso on 4 April 1884. In accordance with the terms of the truce, Chile was to administer Bolivian territory from the 23rd parallel northward to the Rio Loa, thus depriving Bolivia of the northern part of the province of Antofagasta and a Pacific littoral. The eastern boundary of the territory was given as a series of straight-line segments extending northward between stated points from Cerro Zapaleri (Cerro Sapaleri) through the two thirds of the northeastern slope of Cerro Licancabur, Cerro Cabana, most southerly bay head of Salar de Ascotan, Volcan Oyahue (Volcan Ollague) and Volcan Tua, and then by the boundary between the former Peruvian province of Tarapaca and Bolivia.

In 1889, a railroad constructed inland from Antofagasta reached Uyuni on the Bolivian plateau. On May 18, 1895, a treaty signed by Chile and Bolivia confirmed the latter's loss of the territory between the 23rd parallel and the Rio Loa. A second treaty also was signed on the 18th by the two states that promised to transfer Tacna and Arica to Bolivia if Chile obtained them or, if not, the Caleta de Vitor, a small port south of Arica.

On 20 October 1904, a peace treaty between Chile and Bolivia delimited the boundary through 96 specified points between Cerro Zapaleri and Cerro Chipe. Provision was made in the treaty for demarcation and boundary pillars were erected shortly thereafter.

Chilean sovereignty was recognized by Bolivia over the territory from the ocean to the existing Argentine boundary between the 23rd and 24th parallels. Chile also recognized the right of Bolivia in perpetuity to commercial transit through its territory and ports, to be regulated by special agreements.

The Salas-Pinilla Protocol of 1907 made two modifications of the 1904 boundary although ratifications of the protocol were not exchanged until 31 years later. A change was made between Cerro Chipapa and Volcan Olca in favor of Chile in order to keep the Collaguasi railroad, which connected with the Antofagasta-Uyuni railroad, entirely within Chilean territory. In return a second change transferred a small parcel of Chilean territory to Bolivia between Cerro de Patalani and Alto de Panantalla.

In 1913, a railroad was completed between Arica and La Paz, which gave Bolivia access to the Pacific Ocean by means of a second railroad.

In accordance with the terms of the Treaty of Ancón, Peru ceded unconditionally to Chile the littoral Department of Tarapacá, bounded north by the Rio Camarones, south by the Rio Loa, east by Bolivia, and west by the Pacific Ocean. The provinces of Tacna and Arica, bounded north by the Rio Sama from its source in the mountains adjoining Bolivia to the sea, south by the Rio Camarones, east by Bolivia and west by the ocean, were to be administered by Chile for a 10-year period, followed by a plebiscite to determine whether the provinces would remain permanently under Chilean administration or if they would continue to be part of Peruvian territory. Efforts to reach an agreement on the terms of a plebiscite were unsuccessful, and Chile remained in possession of Tacna and Arica after the expiration of the 10-year period stipulated in the Treaty of Ancón.

In a treaty signed at Lima on 3 June 1929, Article 2 delimited the international boundary dividing the disputed territory of Tacna and Arica between Peru and Chile. A complementary protocol signed on the same day stated in Article 1 that neither government might without previous agreement with the other cede to any third state all or any part of the territory which, in accordance with the treaty, remained under their respective sovereignties. In Article 2 of the protocol, port facilities granted to Peru under Article 5 of the treaty should consist of free transit to Peruvian territory and from such across Chilean territory. The placing of pillars marking the boundary was completed the following year and a demarcation protocol was signed at Lima on 5 August 1930.

In 1939, Chile announced a plan to divert the waters of the Rio Lauca westward through a canal and tunnel into the Quebrada Azapa for purposes of irrigation in the Valle de Azapa and hydroelectric-power generation. Within six miles of the international boundary, Lago Cotacotani is the source of the Rio Lauca which flows successively westward, southward, and eastward for about 50 miles in Chilean territory before entering Bolivia where it ultimately reaches Lago Coipasa. Construction on the project was not started until 1948, and water diversion began 14 years later from a dam located about 16 miles southwest of Lago Cotacotani. In 1962 Bolivia threatened to take the matter of water diversion before the Organization of American States (OAS) which organization ultimately requested the Governments of Bolivia and Chile to resort to one of the means of pacific settlement of disputes provided for in the inter-American system.

== Geographic setting ==
The Bolivia–Chile boundary extends along the spectacular heights of the Cordillera Occidental of the Andes. From 13,000 feet (3,960 m) at the Peru tripoint, it connects with numerous snow-capped peaks exceeding 18,000 feet (5,490 m) in elevation to the Argentina tripoint Cerro Sapaleri, at 18,530 feet (5,650 m). Several peaks are above 19,000 feet (5,800 m) such as Cerro Sairecahur with an elevation of 19,587 feet (5,970 m). In general mountain passes are high and not easily accessible with some over 14,000 feet (4,270 m) in elevation. Barren rocky slopes, limited areas of short grasses, and scattered mountain shrubs are typical along the boundary. Near the boundary salars or salt plains are common such as the Salar de Coipasa in Bolivia and the Salar de Ascotán in Chile.

Because of great differences in the elevation and exposure of landform features in the Andes, climatic conditions range broadly along the boundary. Characteristic of the high elevations, mean annual temperatures are relatively low and precipitation tends to be greater on the windward side than on the leeward side of the mountains. The temperatures and precipitation of enclosed valleys and plateau areas contrast greatly with the exposed peaks. Most of the high peaks are snow-capped throughout the year.

In general, the area is sparsely populated and few roads cross the boundary. Small towns serve mining companies, transportation maintenance stations, and scattered people engaged in pastoralism or limited cultivation. The principal roads crossing the boundary parallel the Arica–La Paz and Antofagasta–Uyuni railroads. A number of tracks and trails are in use locally along the boundary.

SRTM-Topographic maps of the boundary Chile-Bolivia

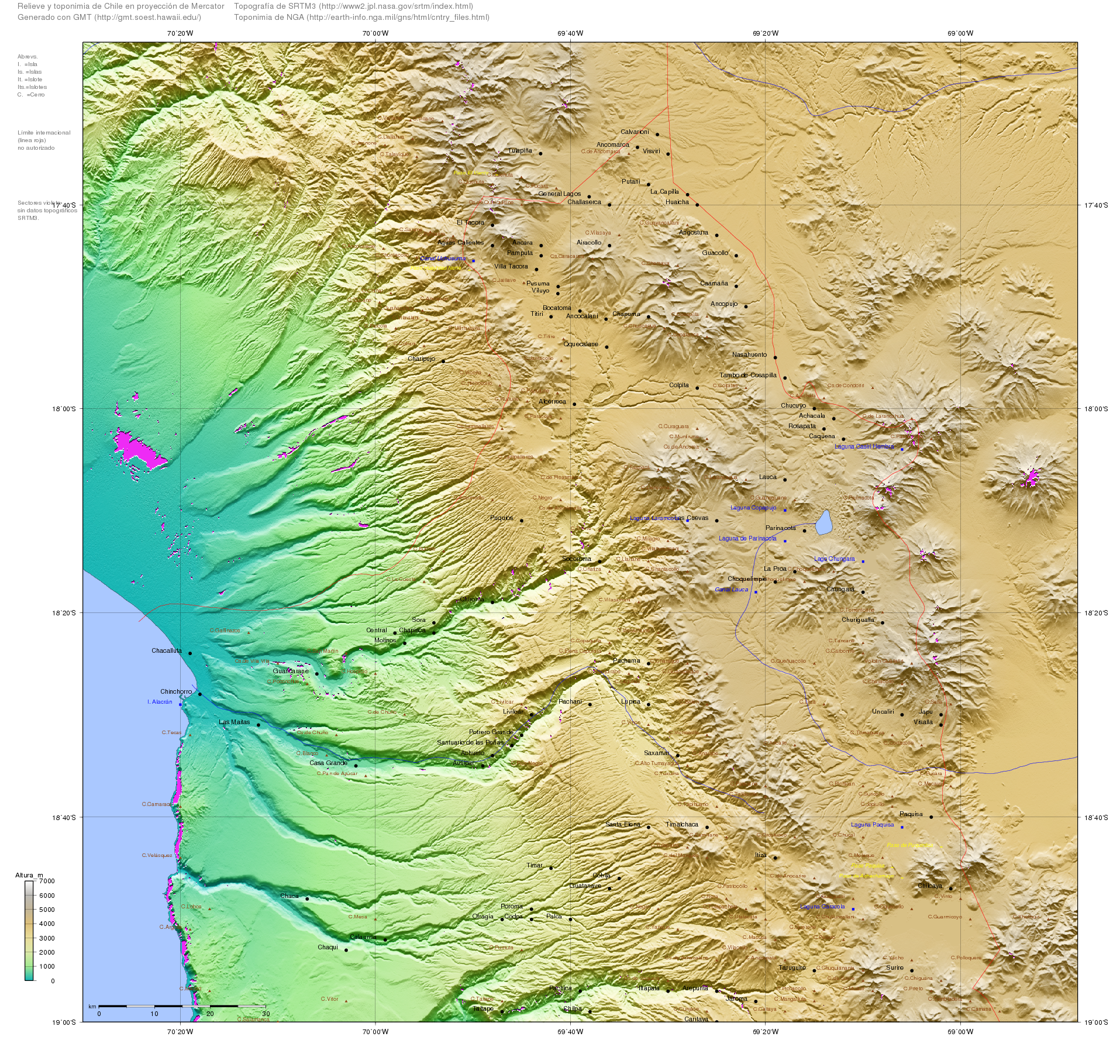
Arica region (17°S to 19°S)

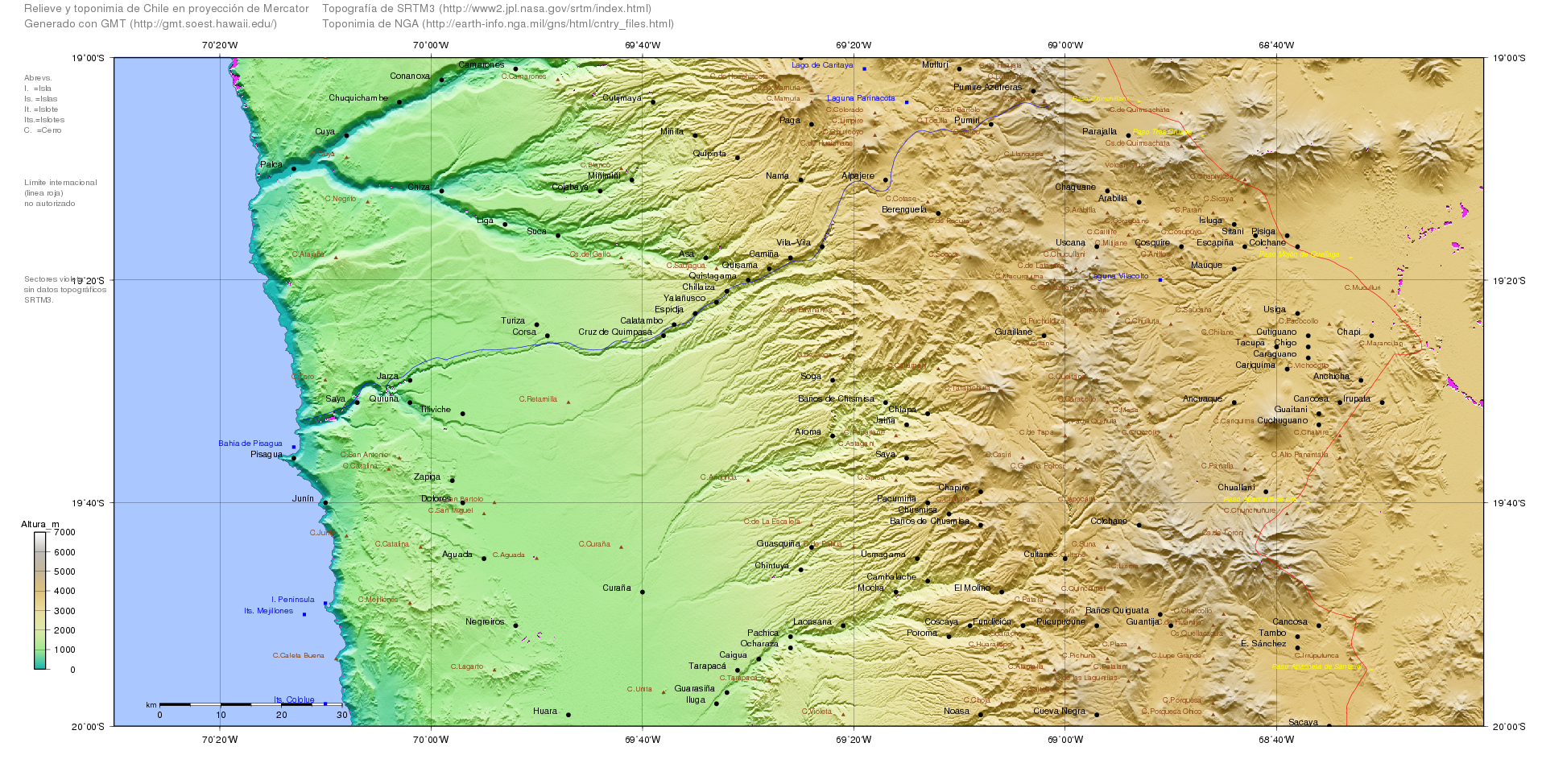
Pisagua region (19°S to 20°S)

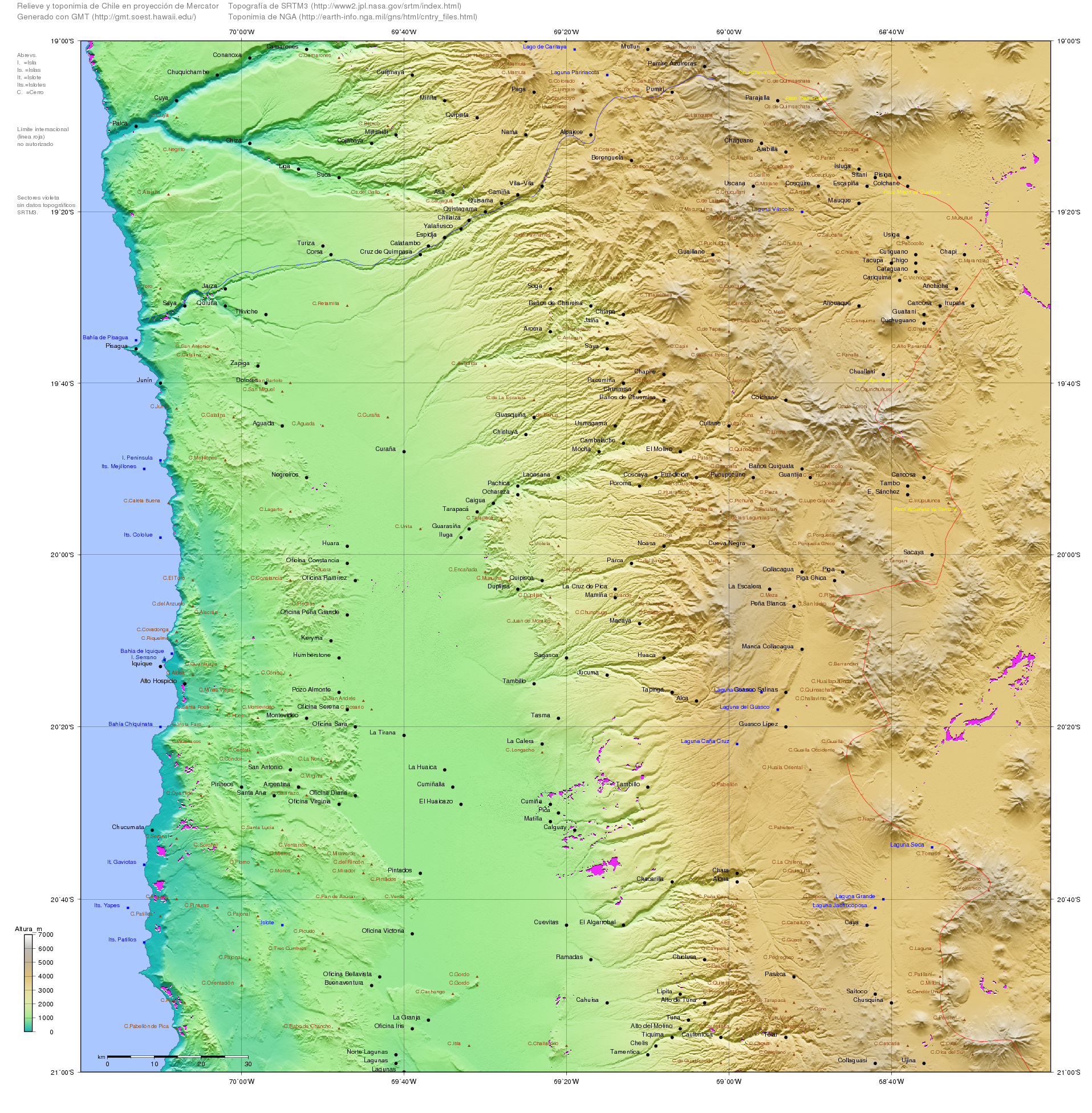
Pisagua and Iquique region (19°S to 21°S)

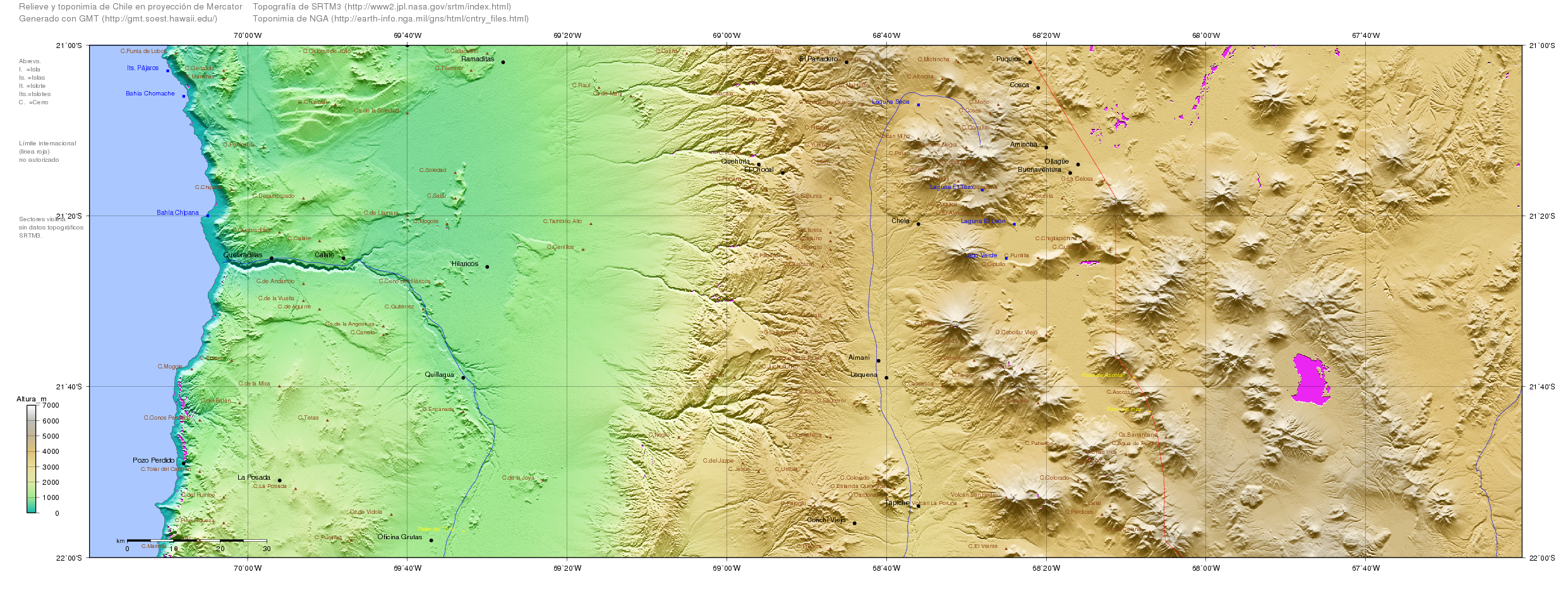
Quillagua region (21°S to 22°S)

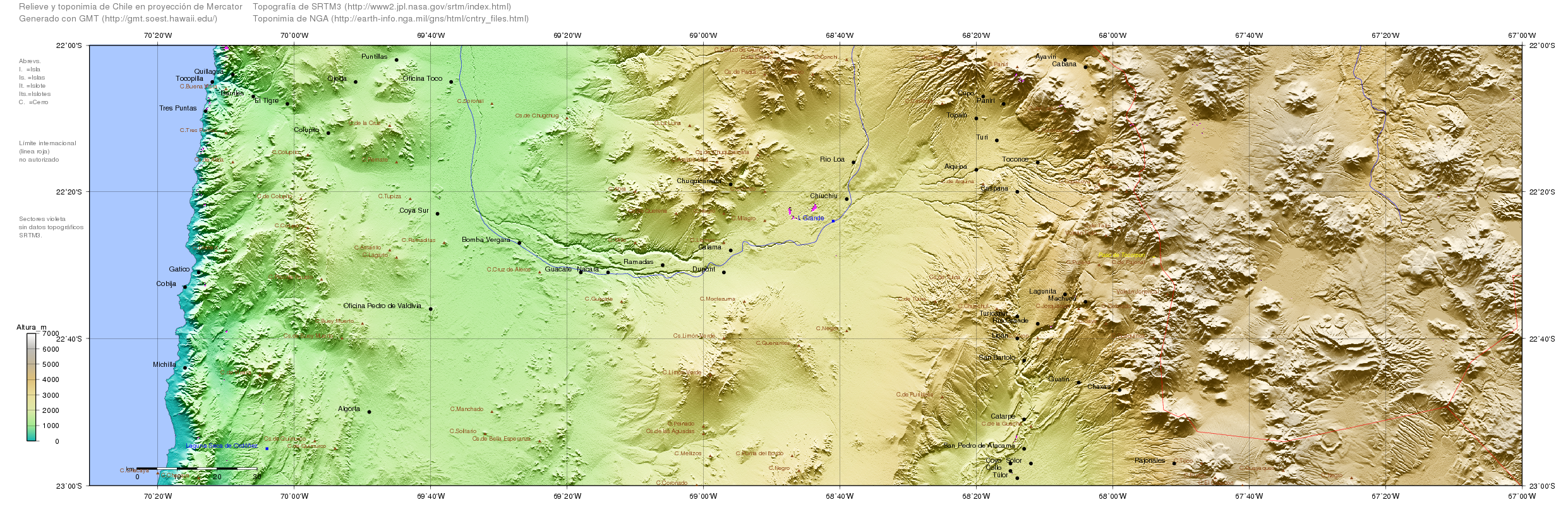
Calama region (22°S to 23°S)

== Boundary alignment ==
The treaty delimited the boundary from south to north through 96 specific points indicated in the text by numbers in parentheses. In accordance with the treaty of 1904, the boundary between Cerro Zapaleri (Cerro Sapaleri), the Argentina tripoint, and Cerro Chipapa is as follows:

From the highest peak of Cerro Zapaleri (1), in a straight line to the highest point (2) of the ridge going toward the south of the Cerros de Guayaques in the approximate latitude of 22° 54'; from here another straight line to the Portezuelo del Cajon (3), and following the divide of that ridge which runs north by the northern slope of Cerro Juriques (Volcan Juriques) (4), through the innominated point located at two thirds of elevation of the northeastern slope of Volcan Licancabur (Cerro Licancabur) in the latitude of 22° 49' 41" and longitude of 67° 52' 35" (5), Cerro Sairecabur (6), [Cerro] Curiquinca (7), and Volcan Putana or [Cerro] Jorjencal (8,) from this point [the boundary] follows by one of the spurs in the direction of the Cerro del Pajonal (9), and in a straight line to the southern peak of the Cerros de Tocorpuri (10), from where it follows again by the divide of the Cordon del Panizo (Cerro Panizo) (11), and Cerros de Tatio (12). It follows always to the north of the divide of the Cordon del Linzor (Volcan Linzor) (13) and of the Cerros de Silaguala (Cordon de Silaguala) (14) from whose northern peak (Volcan Apagado) (15) it goes by a spur to the Cerrito de Silala (Cerro Silala) (16) and then in a straight line to the Cerro Inacaliri or [Cerro] Cajon (17).

From this point it goes in a straight line to the peak that seems to be in the center of the group of the Cerros del Inca or Barranca (Faldas de Barrancane) (18) and then along the divide following northward by the ridge of the Cerro de Ascotan or [Cerro del] Jardin (19); from the peak of this mountain it goes in a straight line to the peak of Cerro Araral (20), and by another straight line to the peak of Volcan Ollague (Volcan Oyahue) (21)

From here [the boundary goes] in a straight line to the highest peak of Cerro Chipapa (22),...

The Boliviano-Chilean protocol of 1907 modified the boundary of 1904 between Cerro Chipapa and Volcan Olca (25) and transferred a small parcel of Bolivian territory to Chile.

Between Cerro Chipapa and Volcan Olca, the boundary shall be a straight line from Cerro Chipapa, as marked, to the northern crest of Cerro Paroma (Cerro Paruma), leaving inside Chilean territory a space of not less than one kilometer between the easternmost point of the Collaguasi railroad and the frontier: from Cerro Paroma it shall continue along the crest which unites Cerro Paroma with Volcan Olca.

The boundary between Volcan Olca and Cerro de Patalani is delimited by the treaty of 1904.

...From this volcano [Volcan Olca] it follows by the ridge of the Cerros del Millunu (Cordon del Milluni) (26), of [Cerro] Laguna (27), Volcan Irruputuncu (28), [Cerro] Bofedal (29) and [Cerro] Chela (30), and from a high point of mountains, it arrives at Milluri (Cerro Milliri) (31) and then Huallcani (32).

From here it goes to the Cerro Caiti (33) and follows by the divide to Cerro Napa(34).

From the peak of this mountain it goes in a straight line to a point (35) situated 10 kilometers to the south of the east peak of Cerro Huailla (36), from where it goes in a straight line to the height mentioned, doubling back again to the east and following by a ridge of the Cerros Laguna (37), Corregidor (38), and Huaillaputuncu (39) to the easternmost stones of [Cerro] Sillillica (40), following along a ridge that goes northwest to the peak of Cerro Piga (41).

From this mountain, it goes in a straight line to the highest peak of Tres Cerritos (42) and follows in a straight line to Cerro Challacollo (43) and to the narrowest part of the fields of Sacaya (44), opposite Vilacollo.

From Sacaya the boundary goes in a straight line to the stones of Cueva Colorada (45) and Santaile (46), where it follows to the northwest by the Cerros Irruputuncu (47) and Patalani (48).

A second modification of the 1904 boundary made by the Boliviano-Chilean protocol of 1907 between Cerro de Patalani and Alto de Panantalla (54) transferred a small piece of Chilean territory to Bolivia

Between Cerro Patalani and Panantaya (Alto de Panantalla), the frontier shall be a straight line from Cerro Patalani to the crest of Cerro Irpa Pueblo, and from there in a straight line to Cerro Irpa; from there it shall follow the divide to the highest point of Cerros Sillayhuay (Cordillera Sillajhuay) and shall double in the north in order to follow the Cerros de Torini (Cerro Toroni) divide to the Apacheta de Oje, and from there the divide to Cerro Armasaya. From this point it shall be a straight line to Apacheta Tirujalla (Apacheta Tillujaya) and from there a straight line to the Alto de Panantaya, as marked.

The boundary between Alto de Panantalla and the Peru tripoint is delimited by the treaty of 1904:

...From the height of Panantalla it goes in a straight line to Tolapacheta (55), half the distance between Chapi and Rinconada, and from this point in a straight line to the Portezuelo Huailla (56); next it passes by the peaks of the Cerros Lacataya (57) and Salitral (58). It returns to the north going in a straight line to the Cerrito Tapacollo (Cerro Tapacollo) (59) in the Salar de Coipasa, and in another straight line to the marker of Quellaga (60) from which it follows in straight lines to the Cerro Prieto (Cerrito Prieto) (61) to the north of the field of Pisiga (Pisiga Sucre), Cerrito Toldo (Cerro Toldo) (62), markers of Sicaya (63), Chapillicsa (64), Cabarray (Cabaray) (65), Tres Cruces (66), Jamachuma (67), Quimsachata (68) and Chinchillani (69), and cutting across the Rio Todos Santos (70) it goes by the landmarks of [Cerro] Payacallo (71) and Carahuano (72) to Cerro Capitan (74).

It then follows northward by the divide of the ridge of the Cerros Lliscaya (75) and Quilhuiri (76) and from the summit at this point it goes in a straight line to the Cerro Puguintica (77).

To the north of this last point, Bolivia and Chile agree to fix the following boundary:
from the Cerro Puquintica (77) it goes northward by the ridge toward Macaya, crossing in this place the Rio Lauca (78) and then following in a straight line to the Cerro Chiliri (Cerro Chilliri) (79); it continues northward by the divide to the Portezuelo de Japu (80), the peak of [Cerro]. Quimasachata (81), Portezuelo Tambo Quemado (82), the Cerros de Quisiquisini (83), Portezuelo Huacollo (Paso Guacollo) (84), peaks of the Cerros de Payachata [Nevados de Payachata] (85 and 86), Cerro Larancahua (87), to the Portezuelo Casiri (88).

From this point it goes to the Cerros de Condoriri (89) that separate the waters of the Rio Sajama and Rio Achuta from those of the Rio Caquena or Cosapilla, and continues by the ridge between those hills, and goes to the Cerro Carbiri (91), passing by the Portezuelo Achuta (90); from Cerro Carbiri, it descends to the narrows of the Rio Caquena or Rio Caspailla (92), above the post house which also bears the last name. It will then follow the course of the Rio Caquena or Rio Cosapilla to the outlet (93) in the meadows of the Estancia, from where it goes in a straight line to the marker to Visviri (94). From here it goes in a straight line [northward to the Peru tripoint]

== Present situation ==
Bolivia continues to have aspirations for a territorial outlet to the Pacific Ocean. Chile has granted Bolivia duty-free use of the ports of Arica and Antofagasta and of the railroads connecting them. An agreement has not been reached by the two states relative to the diversion of water from the Rio Lauca by Chile. There seems to be no dispute with respect to the alignment of the Bolivia-Chile boundary. Diplomatic relations between Bolivia and Chile have been broken since April 1962, with a shorter period of diplomatic relations in 1975 during the Pinochet–Banzer negotiations.

After five years of negotiation, Bolivia sought a ruling by the International Court of Justice on the matter. On October 1, 2018, the ICJ ruled against Bolivia's claim that Chile was under a "legal obligation to negotiate a sovereign access" to the sea for Bolivia.

== See also ==
- Bolivia–Chile relations
- Puna de Atacama dispute
- Bolivian gas conflict
- Arica–La Paz railway
