= San Pedro de Tiquina =

Coordinates: 16°14′S 68°51′W

- Town
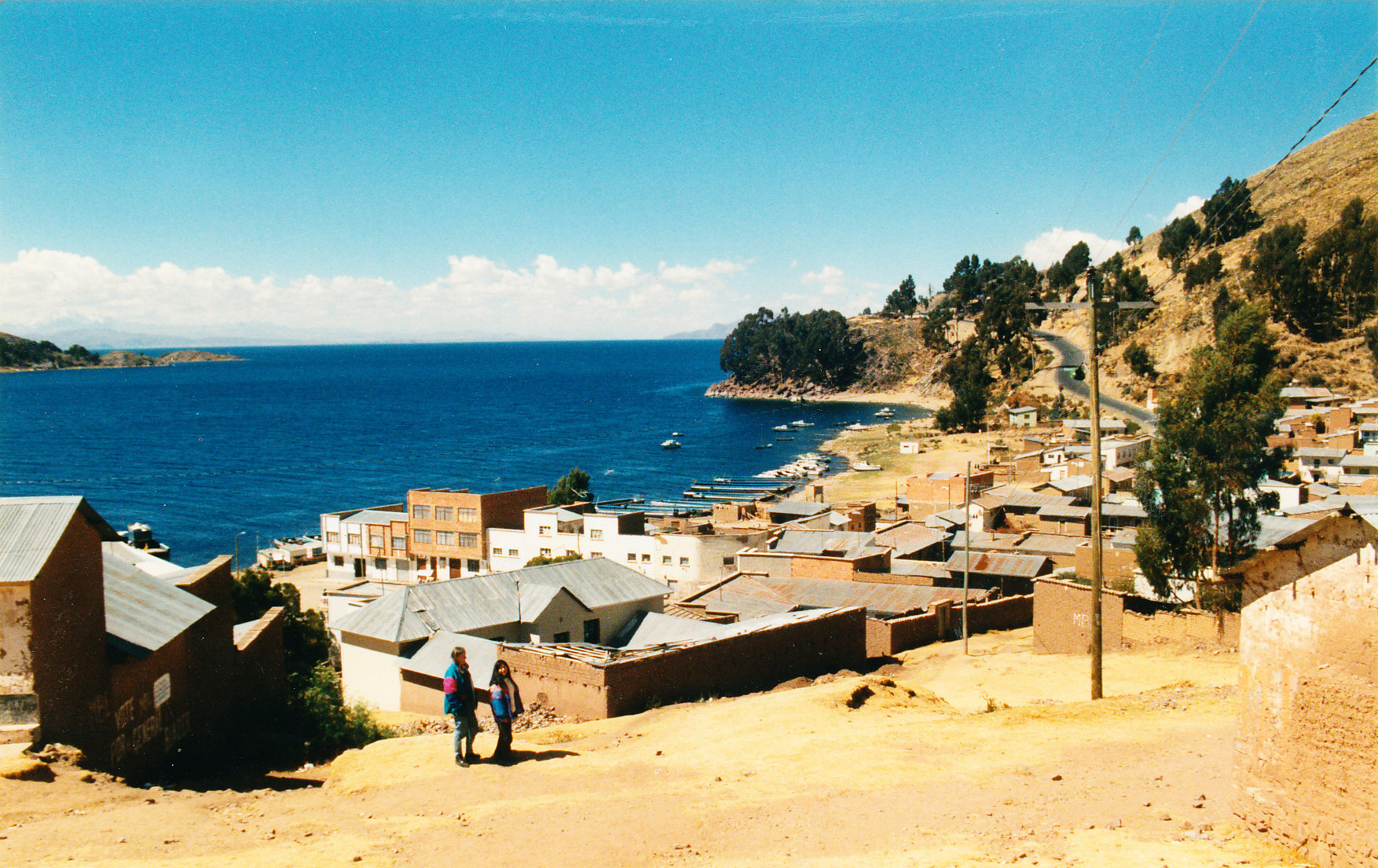
- Interactive map of San Pedro de Tiquina
- Country: Bolivia
- Department: La Paz Department
- Province: Manco Kapac Province
- Municipality: San Pedro de Tiquina Municipality

Population (2001)
  - Total: 839
- Time zone: UTC-4 (BOT)

San Pedro de Tiquina is a town in the La Paz Department, Bolivia.

It is also home to Bolivian Navy flotilla and 4th Naval Service Area/Naval Military Police Battalion #1.

== See also ==
- Strait of Tiquina
