= Strait of Tiquina =

Coordinates: 16.2191°S 68.8504°W

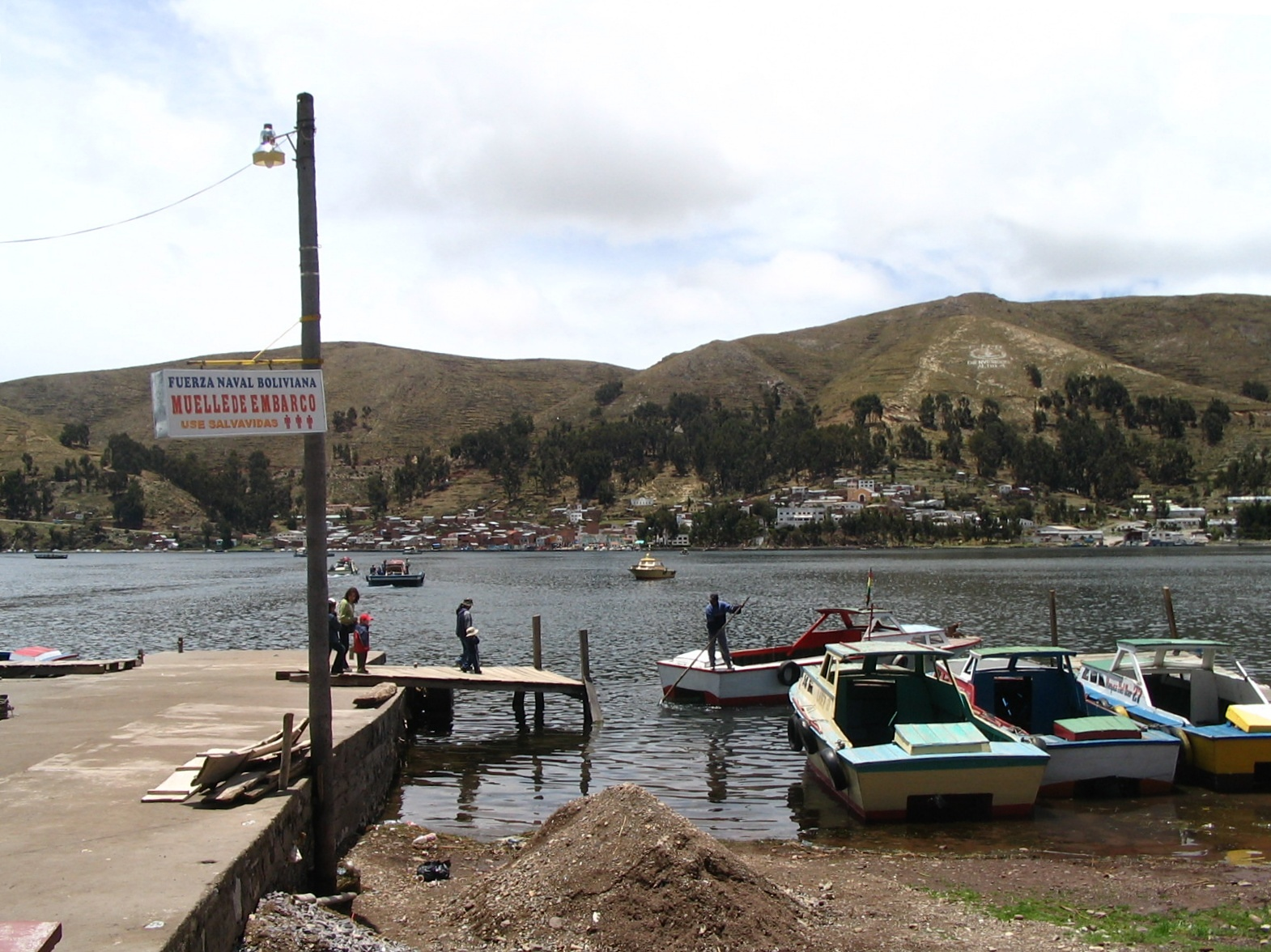
Strait of Tiquina

The Strait of Tiquina is the passage that connects the larger and smaller parts of Lake Titicaca in Bolivia.

== Geography ==
The strait is 850 m (2,790 ft) across at its narrowest point. It joins the upper lake, Lake Chucuito, and the lower (and smaller) lake, Lake Wiñaymarka (or Lake Pequeño, "little lake"). The entire lake is called Lake Titicaca and is the largest lake, by volume, in South America. It is situated on the border of Bolivia and Peru.

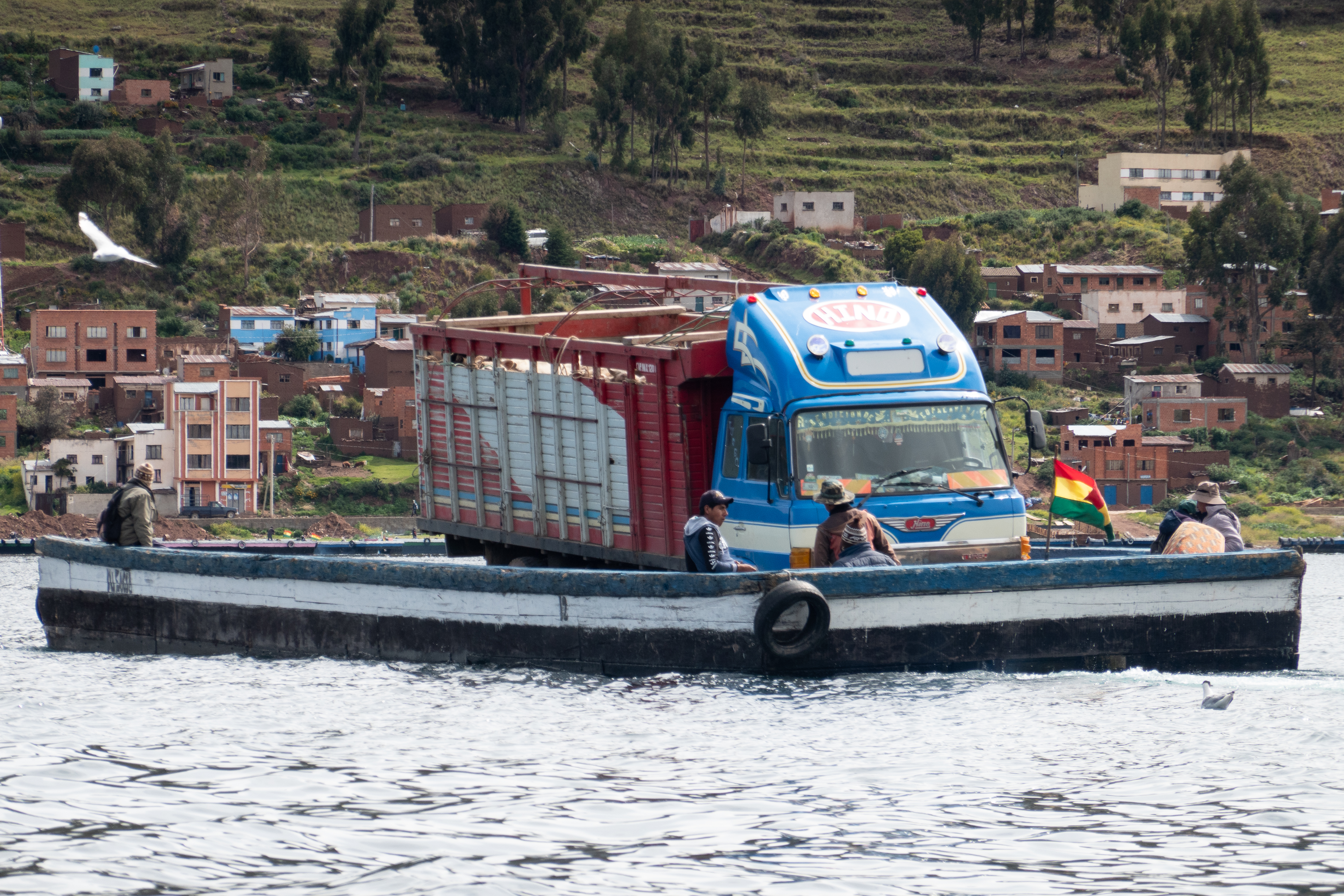
Tiquina Strait crossing

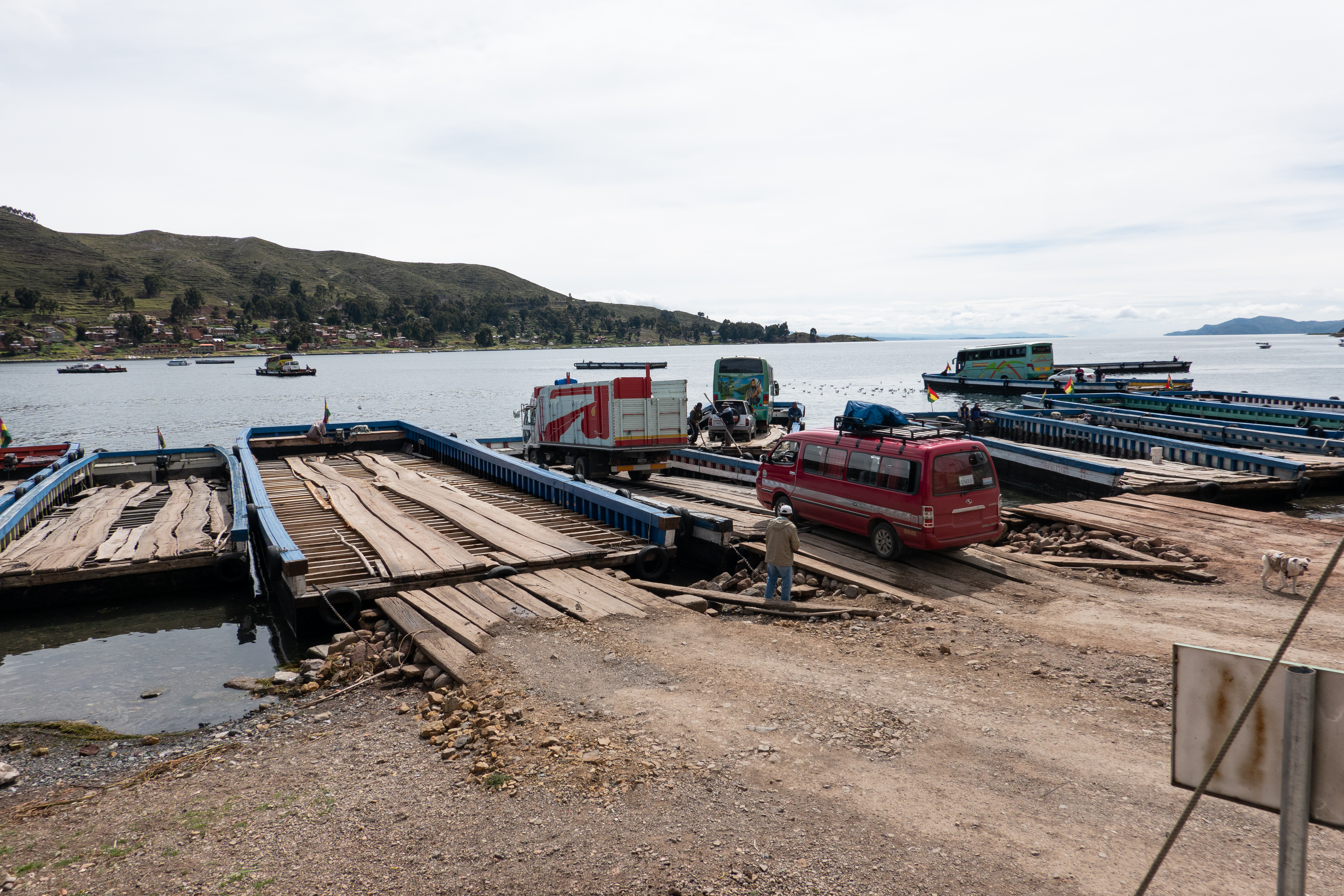
Tiquina Strait barges

To save the distance around Lago Pequeno, buses and cars cross the strait on barges or canoes, the passengers usually separate from the heavier vehicles. The crossing runs between the towns of San Pedro de Tiquina and San Pablo de Tiquina.

== Road blockades ==
The road for the crossing is on occasions blockaded by local residents protesting against increases in ferry tolls and demanding a road bridge. Local residents have campaigned for a bridge to be constructed but barge operators and the Government are against the proposal.

The second point of the blockades is that people who live and work on the Copa Peninsula have pleaded for years with the national government to build a bridge bypassing the Strait of Tiquina: it would be easier, faster, cheaper, and safer to cross ...
