= National Reconstruction (Peru) =

Period of the history of Peru, 1884–1895

Peruvian Republic República Peruana
- 1884–1895
- Flag Coat of arms
- Motto: "Firme y feliz por la unión" (Spanish) "Firm and Happy for the Union"
- Anthem: "Himno Nacional del Perú" (Spanish) "National Anthem of Peru"
- Capital: Lima
- Common languages: Spanish
- Religion: Roman Catholicism
- Demonym: Peruvian
- Government: Presidential republic
- President
  - 1883–1885 (first): Miguel Iglesias
  - 1895 (last): Manuel Candamo
- Legislature: National Congress
- Historical era: Second Militarism
  - Treaty of Ancón: 20 October 1883
  - Conservatives revolts: 27 August 1884
  - Atusparía revolts: 1 March 1885
  - Grace Contract: 25 October 1888
  - Ecuadorian treaty: 2 May 1890
  - Plebiscite deadline: March 1894
  - Piérola revolts: 24 October 1894
  - Piérola takes office: 8 September 1895
  - López takes office: 8 September 1899
- Currency: Sol
Preceded by	Succeeded by
Chilean occupation of Peru	Peru

The name of National Reconstruction (Spanish: Reconstrucción Nacional) is given to the period following the War of the Pacific, which ended through the signing of the Treaty of Ancón on October 20, 1883. It takes place between the civil wars of 1884–1885 and 1894–1895, when an economic, political and social resurgence took place (although some historians extend it to 1919, when the presidency of Augusto B. Leguía begins). During this period, what was known as the Second Militarism (Spanish: Segundo militarismo) took place, also known as the Militarism of the defeat (Spanish: Militarismo de la derrota) in contrast to that which followed Peruvian Independence.

== Background ==
The War of the Pacific ended up completing the destruction that had begun with the economic crisis of the 1870s. By 1879, the Peruvian banking system was bankrupt and agriculture, mining and commerce were barely surviving. At the end of the war and military occupation, life barely continued. The economic situation of the country after the war was quite precarious: the country felt the need to face a future of reconstruction in all its aspects.

Peru had lost its main natural resources, its main productive industries, trade had contracted, the main communication routes collapsed or destroyed, uncontrollable inflation and, above all, an enormous external debt with English creditors, which exceeded £ fifty million, which made it impossible for Peru to receive new international credits.

However, in these years new economic resources would appear to accelerate the country's economic recovery. The exploitation of rubber in the jungle and oil on the north coast began. The exploitation of both natural resources is linked to the phenomenon of the Second Industrial Revolution, which had its greatest exponent in the automobile boom. Likewise, in these years the slow resurgence of sugar and cotton agroindustrial activity began on the northern coast of the country.

=== Second Militarism ===
Historian Jorge Basadre maintains that militarism (the predominance of the military in power) arose in Peru due to the weakness of the civilian ruling class after a time of war, whether internal or external. He also points out three types of militarism that occurred in republican history: after a victory; after a defeat; and in times of crisis or social chaos.

The "First Militarism" occurred after the victory in the war of independence, to which were added the civil and international wars of the first decades of the Republic.

The "Second Militarism" occurs after the defeat in the war against Chile and is divided into two moments: the first (1883–1885), which corresponds to the predominance of the "blue" military led by Miguel Iglesias, who signed peace with Chile; and the second (1886–1895) that corresponds to the predominance of the "reds" led by General Andrés Avelino Cáceres, the same ones who had resisted the invaders until the end. This new militarism has the difficult task of recomposing the administrative and governmental apparatus of the State and of exercising its authority in order to achieve the participation of citizens to guide the nation towards its recovery.However, Schenoni (2024) argues this reorganization was primarily fiscal rather than administrative: Cáceres's 1886 decentralization law strengthened local strongmen (the breñeros) rather than the central bureaucracy, and — unlike Chile after its own war — Peruvian elites remained fragmented along regional lines in its aftermath.

== Political aspect ==
After the catastrophic defeat against Chile, the person who had sufficient prestige and authority to restore social and political order in Peru was General Andrés Avelino Cáceres, known as the hero of the Breña resistance.

Cáceres faced the then president Miguel Iglesias, who had signed the peace treaty with Chile by ceding territory and had asserted himself in power with the support of the Chilean Army. Thus, a civil war broke out. Cáceres demonstrated his military strategy by putting Iglesias' main army out of action in the town of Huaripampa (central Peruvian mountains), an action known as the "huaripampeada" (1884). He then attacked Lima, where his forces surrounded Iglesias in the Government Palace. He resigned from the presidency in 1885, being succeeded by the provisional government of the Council of Ministers (headed by Antonio Arenas), which called elections in which Cáceres won overwhelmingly.

During his first constitutional government (1886–1890), Cáceres undertook National Reconstruction. He founded his own party, the Constitutional (or Cacerista) Party. But his access to State control implied the establishment of a political pact with civilism. It was this consensus that allowed Cáceres and his successor, then Colonel Remigio Morales Bermúdez (1890–1894), to retain political control for almost a decade, in the midst of public peace. With the death of Morales Bermúdez, as a result of a sudden illness in April 1894, the political crisis began again.

After a brief period under Justiniano Borgoño, Cáceres returned to the presidency in 1894, in disputed elections, which led to the formation of the National Coalition against him, made up of democrats and civilists, led by the leader Nicolás de Piérola; A bloody civil war broke out that culminated in the coalition's assault on Lima, before which Cáceres resigned and went into exile in 1895.

The government of a National Junta chaired by Manuel Candamo was established, who called elections in which Nicolás de Piérola was elected. He carried out important economic reforms and achieved political stability in the country, consolidating the presidential system. Piérola was the one who consolidated the National Reconstruction, inaugurating a new stage called the Aristocratic Republic (both terms coined by Basadre), which would last during the first two decades of the 20th century.

== Economic aspect ==
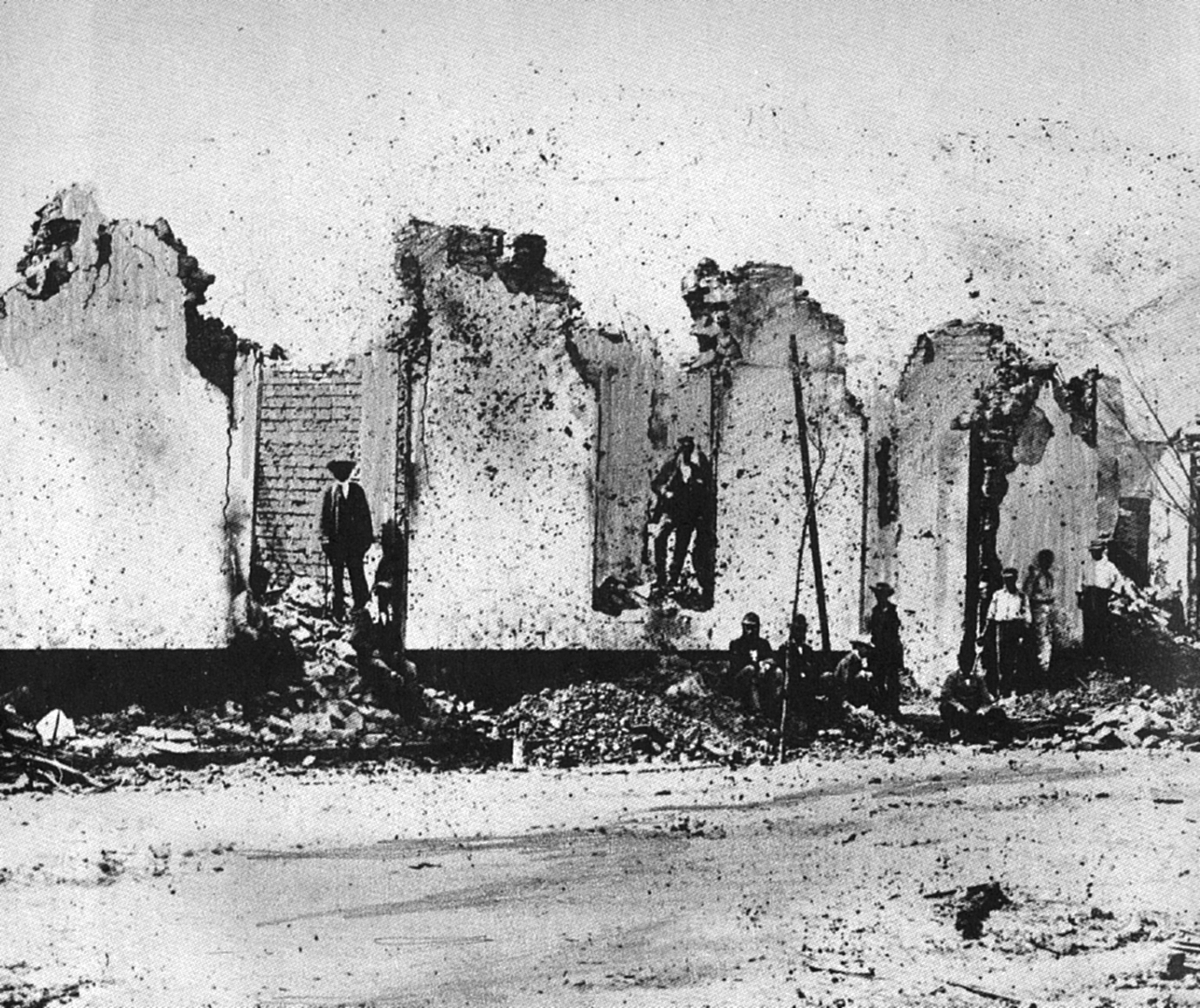
Destroyed buildings in Chorrillos.

Years before the outbreak of the War of the Pacific, the Peruvian economy was severely hit as Guano had ceased to be the main source of resources. Peru had declared bankruptcy in 1876 and, unable to pay its large external debt, decreed a moratorium. It was for this reason that the country's national defense was neglected and its squad could not modernised. Chile was also going through economic difficulties, but, after the Spanish–South American War (1865–1866), the government of Federico Errázuriz Zañartu had approved the acquisition in 1871 of two armored frigates with which it obtained naval supremacy in the Pacific. If already in the years prior to the conflict, the Peruvian economy was in a critical situation, with the development of the war it was practically destroyed.

After the war ended, Peru had to face a series of problems that existed before the outbreak of the conflict. The main one was precisely the external debt with British creditors. These, once peace was signed, demanded that the Peruvian government cancel the debt. Peru was at a crossroads: it did not have the necessary resources to make that payment; and at the same time, it urgently required capital to reactivate its export economy, without which it was impossible to pay its debt. This amounted to about £ 37 million, the annual amortisation of which required a payment of about £ two and a half million, a sum that was then impossible for the country to raise.

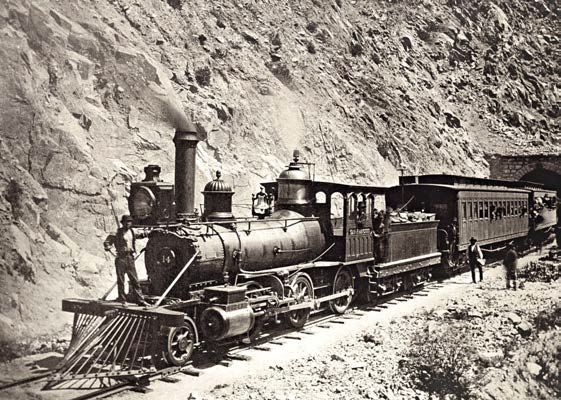
Peruvian Corporation-administered railroad after the signing of the Grace Contract.

So the settlement of the debt was of utmost urgency. This was understood by the first government of Andrés A. Cáceres, which devoted itself fully to the matter, until signing the Grace Contract, by virtue of which the Peruvian State ceded control and administration of its main productive resources to its English creditors (railroads and guano), in exchange for the complete extinction of their debt. Cáceres had to convene three extraordinary Congresses and expel the opposition deputies so that Congress could ratify the contract in July 1889. For better administration of the resources they received, the English creditors converted their foreign debt bonds into shares of the Peruvian Corporation, the most important British company that was created to implement the agreements of said contract.

With the issue of foreign debt thus settled, the Peruvian ruling class understood that the country's future depended on the development of natural resources for export. Thus, the first foundations of a system of exploitation of resources and the native labor force began to be laid, which would reach its most complete consolidation during the First World War.

In its essence, the new organisation of the economy combined the monopolisation of resources, a massive injection of foreign capital, an ability to subject traditional economies to its service, and a deep and complete subordination to the external market. From 1885 to 1895, silver, sugar and rubber, in this order, were the main Peruvian export products. At the same time, significant industrial development took place under the impulse of national capital, initially reflected in the textile sector.

In this new stage of the Peruvian economy, which would last until the Wall Street Crash of 1929, exports were more diversified. The mountains supplied wool (from sheep and camelids) and metals (silver, gold and copper), among others. The Amazon contributed coffee, coca and rubber. And the coast with sugar and cotton.

== Social aspect ==
=== Literature ===
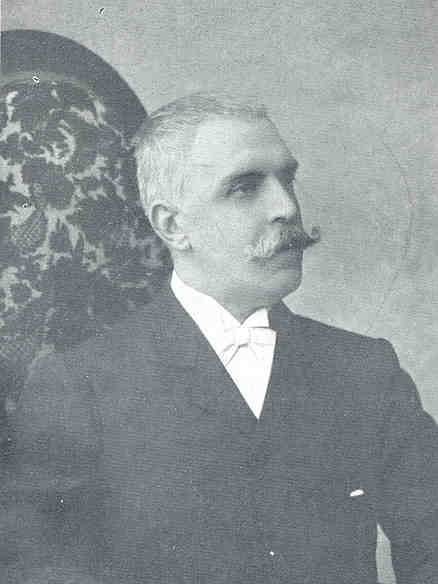
Manuel González Prada.

After the war, a reaction against romanticism emerged in the literary field. The leader of this reaction is Manuel González Prada (1844–1918), who cultivated a poetry that, due to its aestheticising themes and the introduction of new metric forms, was a clear precursor of modernism. Among his works in prose are: Pájinas libres and Horas de lucha, books in which he makes a furious criticism of the political class, responsible, according to him, for the war. The religious institutions and writers of his time were not spared from his attacks either. His extremely critical stance in the field of ideas and literature made him win many enemies and got him into various journalistic controversies. Literary realism was also developed, in a rather tenuous way, in the novel, which became popular from then on in Peru.

A notable characteristic of this period is the emergence of a group of female writers. Many of them—having lost their spouses and older children in the war with Chile—had to earn a living for themselves, and cultivated their literary vocation through gatherings. The main one was that of the Argentine Juana Manuela Gorriti, in which social problems and the influence of European forms were discussed. They wrote novels that in some ways can be classified as realistic. Such is the case of:

- Mercedes Cabello de Carbonera (1845–1909), born in Moquegua, was the initiator of the Peruvian realist novel. She wrote six novels of social content and critical intention, the most successful being Blanca Sol (1888), Las consecuencias (1890) and El conspirador (1892). She also wrote numerous articles and essays published in the press, on literary and social topics; She especially advocated for the emancipation of women, which is why she is among the first feminists in Peru. She was misunderstood at her time, being the target of criticism from male authors such as Juan de Arona and Ricardo Palma. This pushed her to isolate herself. In addition, she began to suffer the consequences of syphilis that her own husband gave her, and she was confined in an asylum, where she died.
- Clorinda Matto de Turner (1852–1909), born in Cuzco, was a traditionist and journalist, precursor or founder of literary indigenism. She is the author of Tradiciones cuzqueñas and the novels Aves sin nido (1899), Índole (1891) and Herencia (1893). The most notable and controversial of her works is Aves sin nido, where she exposes the situation of the Indians who suffered abuse from religious and political authorities. Although its technique and style were deficient, the work aroused interest not only in Peru, but in America and Europe.
- María Nieves y Bustamante (1861–1947), a native of Arequipa, is the author of the historical novel Jorge, el hijo del pueblo (1892), set in the civil war of 1856–1858.

=== Science ===
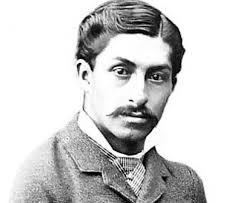
Daniel Alcides Carrión.

In August 1885, Daniel Alcides Carrión, a Peruvian medical student, was inoculated with the help of Evaristo Chávez, the secretion taken from a wart of the patient Carmen Paredes. After 3 weeks he developed the classic symptoms of "Oroya fever", so a common origin of the two diseases was established. Carrión kept a diary with detailed notes of his symptoms until the last days of his illness when his clinical condition worsened and he died of the disease on October 5, 1885. Through sacrifice he was recognised as a martyr of Peruvian medicine and in his honor Peruvian Medicine Day is celebrated on October 5.

In 1888, the Geographical Society of Lima was founded. In 1904, Scipión Llona wrote about the geography of Madre de Dios in the society's bulletin.

Pedro Paulet invented the liquid fuel propulsion engine in 1895 and the first modern rocket propulsion system in 1900. He discovered the advantages of liquid fuel for rocket propulsion and designed, built and successfully tested the first liquid fuel rocket engine. liquid known in history. In 1902, he designed his "torpedo plane" powered by a battery of rockets, mounted on a pivoting wing that allowed it to take off vertically, after which they rotated backwards to propel it into horizontal flight.

In 1901, Augusto Weberbauer began his botanical research in Peru. In 1911 he published his masterpiece, The Flora of the Peruvian Andes in its Fundamental Features (German: Die Pflanzenwelt des peruanischen Anden in ihren Grundzügen Dargestellt).

In 1908, the Seismological Observatory of Lima was inaugurated at the Park of the Exhibition.

In 1911, Fermín Tangüis, after 10 years of research, discovered a variety of cotton that resisted the cotton wilt (a fungus that had destroyed numerous plantations), and surpassed Pima cotton in unit production; In addition, its long and thick fiber was in great demand in spinning mills, since it did not break and was easy to manufacture. Finally, its cultivation required little water and was very rustic, so it could be planted in places that were previously not considered suitable for cotton. Their "special" cotton (called Tangüis cotton) spread quickly through the coastal valleys, contributing to a new cotton boom.

Santiago Antúnez de Mayolo published a study on the hydroelectric potential of the Cañón del Pato, which he titled "Project of the Hydro-Electro-Chemical Installation of the Pato Canyon on the Santa-Perú River" (Spanish: Proyecto de la Instalación Hidro-Electro-Química del Cañón del Pato sobre el río Santa-Perú), in 1915.

== Important works and events ==
=== Government of Miguel Iglesias (1883–1885) ===
- Signing of the Treaty of Ancón (October 20, 1883).
- Beginning of the reorganisation of the public administration, whose structure had been broken by the war.
- Restructuring and reopening of the National Library, a task that was entrusted to Ricardo Palma.
- Reopening and reconstruction of the National University of San Marcos, after the vandalism and looting it suffered at the hands of the Chileans. Other study centers were also reborn, such as College of Our Lady of Guadalupe.
- Establishment of the personal contribution and the “works of the republic” (communal tasks), which fell on the indigenous population, which occasioned the rebellion of Atusparia and Uchcu Pedro, in the region of Áncash.
- As soon as the Chileans withdrew, civil war broke out. The government troops of Iglesias faced the revolutionaries of General Andrés A. Cáceres, who triumphed.

=== Government of the Council of Ministers (1885–1886) ===
After the civil war, the provisional government of the Council of Ministers was installed, headed by Antonio Arenas. The Council of Ministers called general elections, in which Cáceres participated as the sole candidate, with the support of the Constitutional Party that he had just founded. Cáceres triumphed.

=== First Government of Andrés A. Cáceres (1886–1890) ===
- The Grace Contract was signed with the bondholders of Peru's external debt. Railways, guano, jungle territories, etc. are given in concession.
- Fiscal bills were abolished, which were replaced by metallic currency.
- The Departmental Boards were created in 1886 with the objective of decentralising the collection of contributions and investing them for the benefit of the tributary towns themselves.
- He promoted the creation of workshop or craft schools.
- The Tribunal of the Consulate of Lima was abolished (1887) and the Lima Chamber of Commerce was created (1888).
- The Geographical Society of Lima was founded (1888).
- Electric lighting was inaugurated in the centre of Lima (1886), by the Peruvian Electric Construction and Supply Company.
- A telephone service was installed in Lima (1888), run by Bacigalupi y Cía. The first subscribers lived in Lima, Callao, Miraflores, Barranco and Chorrillos.
- The Banco Italiano was founded (1888).
- The army was reorganised and the Military School was reopened (1889). The warship Lima also arrived.
- The first bicycles were imported (1889).
- The Santa Catalina National Fabric Factory was founded on the corner of Jr. Andahuaylas and Grau Avenue (1889). The Vitarte weaving factory was acquired by the English company Peruvian Cotton (1890), which gave the industry a great boost.
- The London Pacific Petroleum Company settled in Talara to exploit the La Brea y Pariñas oil wells (1890).
- Repatriation of the remains of those killed during the war (1890).
- On May 2, 1890, the García–Herrera Treaty was signed with Ecuador, which sought to end the boundary conflict with that country. Peru gave up large portions of the disputed territory. The Ecuadorian Congress approved the treaty, but the Peruvian Congress, before approving it, made modifications to the line drawn, which was to the displeasure of Ecuador. The treaty was void and both parties resumed negotiations.
- In the general elections of 1890, General Remigio Morales Bermúdez, who had official support, presented himself as a candidate, as did Francisco Rosas Balcázar, representative of the Civilista Party. Piérola, leader of the Democratic Party, could not participate in the elections because he was in prison. Once these were done, Morales Bermúdez triumphed.

=== Government of Remigio Morales (1890–1894) ===
- Shortly after assuming the presidency, a military mutiny occurred in the Santa Catalina Barracks, which was violently defeated (December 3, 1890).
- Regarding foreign policy, he put his efforts into the execution of the Tacna and Arica plebiscite, whose 10-year period for its completion ended in 1894, in accordance with the provisions of the Treaty of Ancón. But the plebiscite would not take place then or ever, due to Chile's unilateral decision. This issue would since then be the main concern of the Peruvian Foreign Ministry, extending over three decades.
- Congress issued the Municipalities Law, on October 14, 1892, to allow the reestablishment of said entities throughout the country.
- A law was approved that introduced the legal remedy of habeas corpus that limited the arbitrary imprisonment of those accused of common crimes (1893).
- The spread of primary education was encouraged, creating some schools.
- Laws were given to protect industry and commerce.
- The construction of roads to the Amazon was intensified and the road to Pichis was inaugurated.
- The construction of the railways from Lima to La Oroya and from Juliaca to Cuzco continued.
- The city of Arequipa was provided with drinking water service.
- Morales Bermúdez did not finish his presidential term, as he died on April 1, 1894, victim of an illness, and was replaced in command by the second vice president, Colonel Justiniano Borgoño, with the postponement of the first vice president Pedro Alejandrino del Solar.

=== Government of Justiniano Borgoño (1894) ===
Borgoño's appointment was not well received by the members of Congress who adopted an attitude of open struggle against the new president. Borgoño, in response, suppressed Congress and called general elections to elect the new president and a new parliament. Months earlier, General Cáceres had arrived from Europe and launched his candidacy for the Presidency of the Republic, counting on official support. Given the lack of guarantees for the other parties, they abstained from participating. Once the elections were held, Cáceres was triumphant, assuming the presidency for the second time, on August 10, 1894.

During his tenure, the following were incorporated into the service of the Navy: the warship Constitución and the wooden transport Chalaco.

=== Second Government of Andrés A. Cáceres (1894–1895) ===
On August 10, 1894, Cáceres assumed the presidency for the second time, amid popular discontent. The result of the 1894 elections was contested by the opponents of Cáceres, the Civil and Democratic parties, who formed the National Coalition led by Nicolás de Piérola, thus beginning a violent civil war. Numerous groups of Montoneros emerged throughout the Republic. In the north, the band of Piuran landowners with the name Seminario, became famous. Piérola, who created the revolution from Chile, landed in Puerto Caballas and from Chincha he advanced to Lima, where he entered leading his troops through the Portada de Cocharcas, on March 17, 1895. The fighting in the capital lasted for three days. Seeing the adverse situation, Cáceres resigned and went into exile.

=== Government of the Government Junta (1895) ===
A Government Junta chaired by Manuel Candamo was in charge of commanding the Nation. This Government Board, as a transitional government body, did not carry out effective work and was content to preserve internal order and security. Its main task was the call for general elections. The National Coalition, maintaining the alliance, launched the candidacy of Piérola, who, without a challenger, was elected with an overwhelming majority.

== See also ==
- First Militarism
- War of the Pacific
- Chilean occupation of Peru

== Bibliography ==
- Basadre, Jorge (2005). Historia de la República del Perú (1822–1933) (9th ed.). Lima: Empresa Editora El Comercio S. A. ISBN 9972-205-74-6.
- Contreras, Carlos; Cueto, Marcos (2013). Historia del Perú contemporáneo (in Spanish) (5th ed.). Lima: Instituto de Estudios Peruanos.
- Rivera Serna, Raúl (1975). Historia del Perú. República 1822-1968 (in Spanish) (2nd ed.). Lima: Editorial Jurídica.
- Guerra, Margarita (1984). Historia General del Perú. Vol. 11: La República Aristocrática (1st ed.). Lima: Editorial Milla Batres. pp. es.
