= Peruvian Civil War of 1894–1895 =

Civil war in Peru

- Part of the National Reconstruction
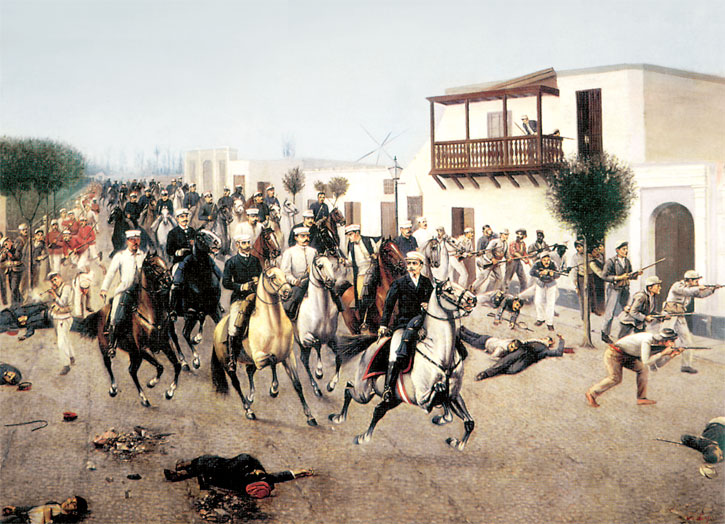
- Painting of De Piérola arriving in Lima by Juan Lepiani
Date	October 24, 1894 – March 19, 1895
Location	Peru
Result	Rebel victory: Abdication of Cáceres; De Piérola becomes president

Belligerents
Government of Peru	National Coalition

Commanders and leaders
Andrés A. Cáceres	Nicolás de Piérola

Strength
Peruvian Army: 4,000 (in Lima)	National Army: 5,000 (in Lima)

Casualties and losses
- 4,000 deaths in total

The Peruvian Civil War of 1894–1895 was an internal conflict in Peru that lasted from October 1894 to March 1895, and was sparked by the election of Andrés Avelino Cáceres to the presidency of Peru, which was opposed by Nicolás de Piérola and his armed forces.

The immediate cause of the conflict was the questioned election of Cáceres in 1894, carried out outside the constitutional framework, but the fundamental cause was the need to end the hegemony of the Constitutional (or Cacerist) Party, in power since 1886, and with the rise of militarism in the political scenario, the so-called Second Militarism.

The revolutionaries or insurgents were known as pierolists, after their leader, or as coalitionists, since the parties opposing Cáceres that promoted the uprising had united in a self-named National Coalition. Their ranks were made up of Montoneros or guerrillas, who emerged in various provinces of the country, as well as volunteers; while the government had the support of the regular army concentrated in Lima. The conflict culminated with the entry of the Montoneros into Lima and the abdication of Cáceres, after bloody clashes in the streets of the city. This war marked the end of an era in the Republican history of Peru and the beginning of another, known as the Aristocratic Republic.

== Background ==
After the Peruvian defeat in the War of the Pacific, the so-called National Reconstruction began in Peru. In the political order, there was the appearance of the Second Militarism, with generals Miguel Iglesias and Andrés Avelino Cáceres, who disputed power. Iglesias came to power in 1883 and signed peace with Chile that same year, but faced the revolution led by Cáceres, which triumphed in 1885. This was the first Peruvian civil conflict after the war with Chile. A provisional government was established, headed by the Council of Ministers, which called for elections, in which Cáceres triumphed as the head of his party: the Constitutional Party. His government ended in 1890, but his influence in power was maintained in the following years, since his successor, Colonel Remigio Morales Bermúdez, belonged to the ranks of the same party.

=== The "National Coalition" ===
At that time, the opposition to the Cacerist government was represented by two political groups:

- The Civic Union (which was an alliance between the supporters of Mariano Valcárcel, a dissident of Cacerism, and the Civilista Party, the already traditional party that was founded in 1871)
- The Democratic Party, founded in 1882 by Nicolás de Piérola, a popular civil leader who had been arrested in 1890 by the government of Morales Bermúdez, but who managed to escape to Chile.

On March 30, 1894, on the eve of Morales Bermúdez's death, a coalition pact was signed between civilistas and democrats "in defense of electoral freedom and freedom of suffrage." Thus the National Coalition was formed, which brought together the most bitter adversaries in Peruvian political history. Subsequently, groups of revolutionary guerrillas or Montoneros began to spontaneously emerge in all the provinces of Peru, thus beginning the civil rebellion against the second government of General Cáceres. Among the most prominent Montoneros were the brothers Oswaldo, Augusto, Edmundo and Teodoro Seminario, in Piura; the landowner Augusto Durand, in Huánuco; Colonel Felipe Santiago Oré, among others.

== Conflict ==
The movement still did not have a leader or a direction, but then Guillermo Billinghurst was entrusted to go to Chile in search of Nicolás de Piérola, who had been exiled since 1891. Piérola agreed to lead the revolution and embarked in Iquique, on October 19, 1894, aboard a boat with only two oars and a lateen sail. It is said that Billinghurst was only able to obtain such a fragile means of transportation and that upon seeing her, Piérola asked him: "Would you embark on this boat?" Billinghurts replied: “Not me; "But I have not proposed to be the regenerator of Peru." Piérola took on the challenge and successfully completed the long coastal journey of three hundred nautical miles from Iquique to Puerto Caballas, near Pisco, where he landed on October 24. Those who saw him could not believe that he had traveled such a distance aboard a fragile boat.

From Puerto Caballas, Piérola went to Chincha, where on November 4, 1894 he launched a "Manifesto to the Nation", assuming the position of "National Delegate". He maintained that the uprising was essential to reestablish the rule of order and law, so brutally violated, and to return to Peru its unknown sovereignty and its outraged dignity.

From Chincha, Piérola went to Cañete, where the Montoneras gathered around him. He then moved on to Huarochirí, thus beginning the campaign on Lima. Meanwhile, the northern and central departments joined the revolution. On January 26, 1895, Arequipa fell into the power of the revolutionaries operating in the south, who captured the Prefecture, the prison, the temple towers and other places. On January 27, Colonel Juan Luis Pacheco Céspedes, who had joined the Pierolist movement, was defeated and killed in Moquegua. In Cuzco, on April 3, coalition forces led by Colonels Esteban Salas and Antonio Fernández-Baca managed to take over the city after a bloody confrontation in the streets in which subprefect Colonel Antonio Marzo was killed. In a skirmish near Puno, the arequipeño Diego Masias y Calle was mortally wounded by a Cacerist bullet, and he was transferred to his hometown and died a few days later. After several battles, the entire south of Peru was under the control of the Coalition, although in Arequipa Amador del Solar took control, with the title of Delegate of the First Vice President of the Republic (that is, of Pedro Alejandrino del Solar, his father, whom he considered constitutionally indicated to constitute a government). With only Lima remaining, the offensive on the city took a little longer. Meanwhile, the coalitionists were forming the so-called National Army, whose chief of staff was the German soldier Carlos Pauli. Many volunteers enrolled in said army.

=== The attack on Lima ===
Battle of Lima
Date	March 17–19, 1895 (2 days)
Location	Cercado de Lima
Result	Revolutionary victory

Belligerents
Government of Peru	National Coalition

Commanders and leaders
(Peru) Andrés A. Cáceres	(Peru) Nicolás de Piérola

Since January 1895, Lima had lived in constant uncertainty as Piérola's attack was feared from one moment to the next. Cáceres had 4,000 well-armed men, and the coalitionists only had 3,000. On the afternoon of March 16, 1895, Piérola ordered the attack on the capital. His army was divided into three bodies to simultaneously attack Lima from the north, centre and south.

In the early hours of Sunday, March 17, the attack began and Piérola, on horseback and at the head of his army, entered through the Portada de Cocharcas. Cáceres' forces retreated to the Government Palace while fighting. Piérola established his General Headquarters in the Plazuela del Teatro, four blocks from the Plaza de Armas. The fighting that took place in the city was extremely violent.

=== The armistice ===
At dawn on March 19, more than 1,000 bodies lay unburied in the streets and no less than 2,000 wounded in hospitals. The strong summer heat began to decompose the corpses, which threatened to unleash an epidemic. The diplomatic corps then met and under the presidency of the Apostolic Nuncio, Monsignor José Macchi, a 24-hour truce was achieved between the combatants to bury the dead and care for the wounded. Technically speaking, Piérola's Montonero forces had not achieved victory, since Cáceres' army remained practically intact; However, the public atmosphere was in favour of the revolutionaries and that is how the Cacerists understood it.

Once the armistice was extended, an agreement was signed between Luis Felipe Villarán (representative of Cáceres) and Enrique Bustamante y Salazar (representative of de Piérola), under the mediation of the Diplomatic Corps, agreeing to the establishment of a Government Board chaired by civilist Manuel Candamo, and with two representatives from Cáceres and two from Piérola. The mission of this Junta would be to call elections, while the two armies withdrew from the capital. General Cáceres resigned from the government. The revolution had triumphed.

Early on the same day, Cáceres had sought political asylum at the legation of the United Kingdom at the suggestion of Macchi. Understanding that his life would be in danger (and that it could end similarly to that of José Manuel Balmaceda), Cáceres, accompanied by the legation's head of mission and its naval attaché, left for Callao aboard a Berline drawn by two horses on the 23rd. Once at the port, Cáceres boarded a French warship that had agreed to protect him, leaving for Montevideo on the 27th aboard the Serapis. He arrived at the Uruguayan capital on April 27, staying at the Hotel de las Pirámides and leaving for Buenos Aires a week later, where he met with his wife and daughters, who left for Valparaíso also under protection.

== Aftermath ==
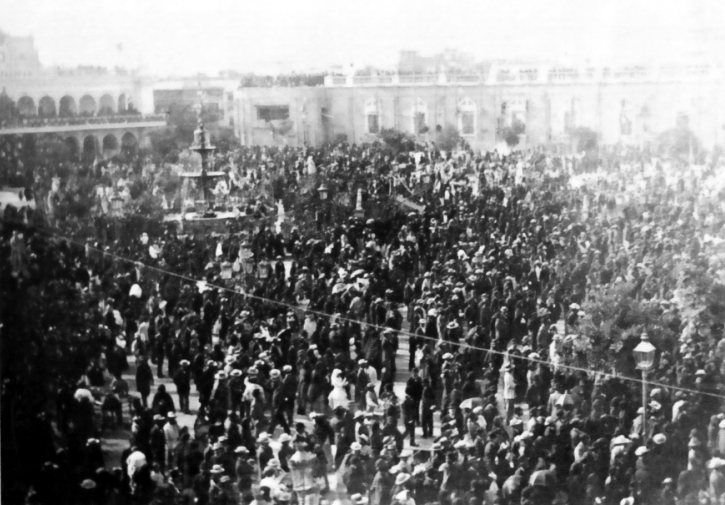
Crowds in the Playa Mayor celebrating the revolution's triumph.

On April 8, 1895, Pedro Alejandrino del Solar recognised the Government Board and renounced the right that some attributed to him to assume the presidency, in his capacity as first vice president of the government of Morales Bermúdez. On April 14, the Government Junta called presidential elections. The National Coalition, maintaining the alliance, launched the candidacy of Piérola, who without a challenger was elected with an overwhelming majority. Until then, the elections were held through the indirect system of the Electoral Colleges: of the 4,310 voters, 4,150 voted for Piérola.

Nicolás de Piérola was anointed as President of the Republic on September 8, 1895. During his tenure, he became the so-called architect of the National Reconstruction that began after the War of the Pacific. He also inaugurated a period of political stability later known as the Aristocratic Republic, which would last during the first two decades of the 20th century. Demonstrating the spirit of a statesman, Piérola summoned the most capable to occupy positions in the government, without taking into account partisan background; he scrupulously respected the Constitution; He strengthened public institutions and promoted the comprehensive development of the country.
