= Diego García de Paredes (conquistador) =

Spanish conquistador (1506–1563)

Diego García de Paredes y Vargas (1506, Trujillo, Spain – 1563, Catia, Province of Venezuela, Spanish Empire) was a maestre de campo and a Spanish conquistador who participated in, among other things, the Battle of Cajamarca. He also founded Trujillo, Venezuela in 1557.

== Biography ==
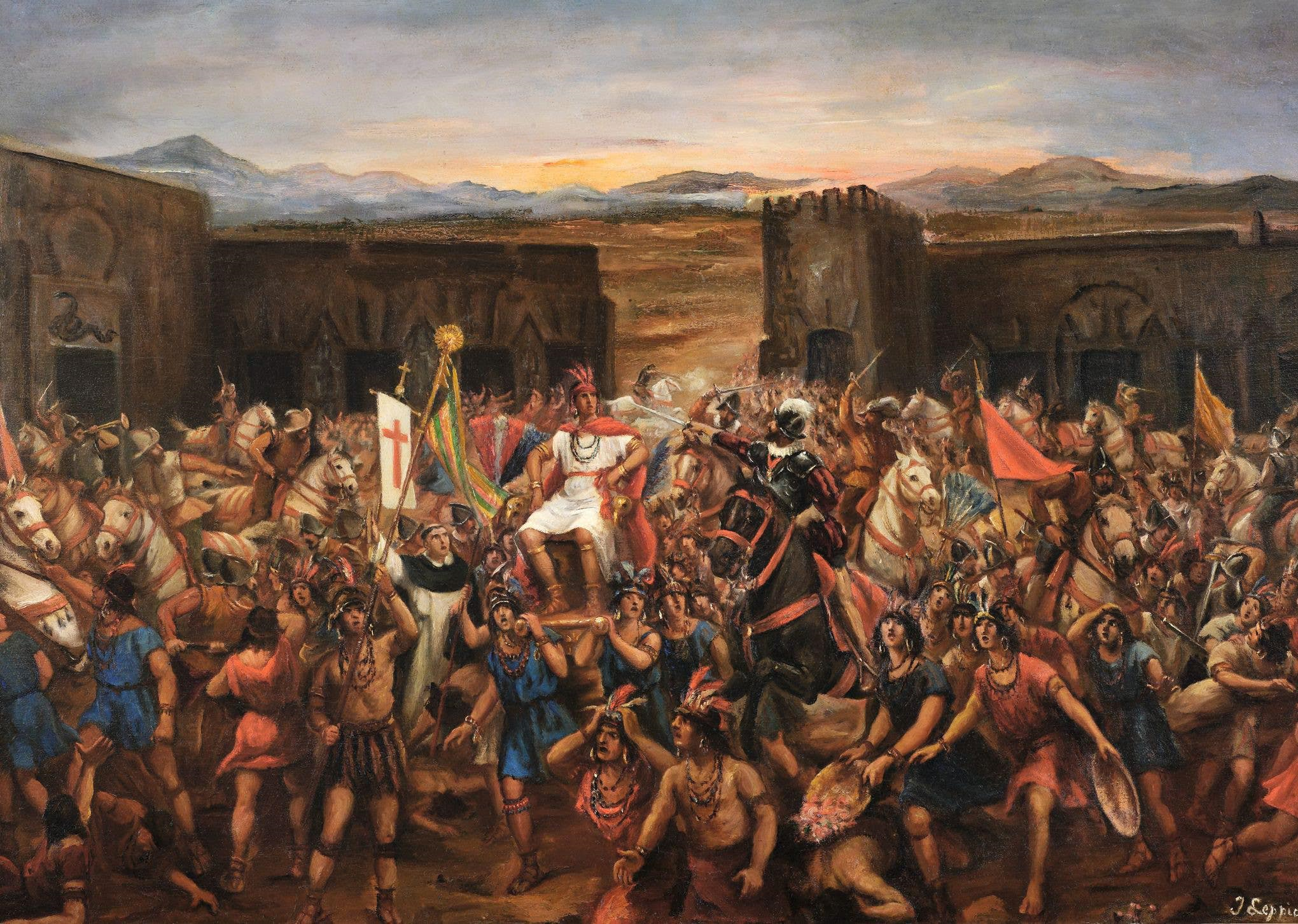
The capture of Atahualpa by Juan Lepiani

Diego García de Paredes was born in Trujillo and was the son of Diego García de Paredes “the Samson of Extremadura”, who fought in the Italian Wars and the war of Navarre, and Mencía de Vargas.

When he turned 18 he left for the New World and arrived in Nicaragua, where he would help conquer those territories under Gil González Dávila and Hernando de Soto. In 1530 he would move to Panama where he joined the Francisco Pizarro expedition as one of the one hundred and sixty men marching to the heart of the Inca Empire with the firm objective of conquering it. Paredes took part in the Battle of Cajamarca, in which they captured Atahualpa, effectively conquering the whole territory.

In 1534 he returned to Spain and later participated in wars in Flanders, France, Tunisia and Sicily, obtaining the rank of captain. After that, he returned to Trujillo.

Bored of life in Spain, Paredes returns to the New World in 1544 and participates in Francisco de Orellana’s second expedition to the Amazon. The expedition was a failure, losing fifty seven men due to hunger and seventeen because of attacks by the natives. He was one of the few who survived, and went to New Granada after the expedition to conquer those territories.

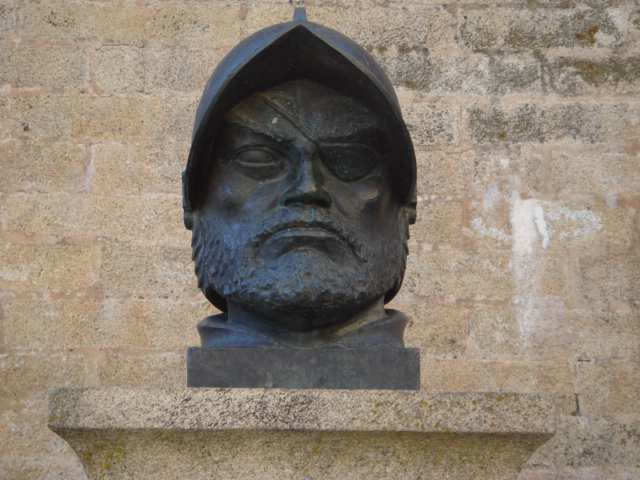
Bust of Francisco de Orellana in Trujillo, Cáceres

After that, he moved to Venezuela and in 1550 participates in the founding of Barquisimeto. In 1553 when the town is attacked and threatened by Negro Miguel at the head of a party of blacks cimarrones who had revolted in the Buria gold mines committing some misdeeds, he lends himself for the defense of the city. The settlers led by García Paredes and Diego Hernández de Serpa, together with a reinforcement that arrived from the city of El Tocuyo, led by Diego de Losada and Diego de Ortega, defeated Negro Miguel and his followers were persecuted and again reduced to slavery. According to the testimony of Captain Ortega, it was García Paredes who killed Miguel.

In 1557 Paredes found the city Trujillo in the sacred valley of the cuicas indians.
Some time later the foreman Juan Rodríguez Suarez went to Trujillo while running away from Juan de Maldonado after escaping of the prison of Santa Fe. They refused to turn him over, and that action became the first example of political asylum in the Americas. In 1561 Lope de Aguirre led his Maranones Rebellion across Venezuela, and Paredes was sent to fight him. He engaged Aguirre's forces at Barquisimeto, and Aguirre was ultimately killed by his one of his men, Custodio Hernandez. Lope de Aguirre was then judged post mortem and found guilty of lèse-majesté.

In 1562, he returned to Spain to ask compensation for the services given to the crown and the king Philip II named him as governor of Popayán. When the ship arrived at the coast of Venezuela Paredes landed with five soldiers to ask about his friend Luis de Narváez, who he didn't know had been killed some time before. While they were dining with the natives suddenly they lifted Narvaez's head and killed García de Paredes and the five soldiers accompanying him. The ones who remained in the boat had to leave them there because there was nothing they could do. According to Pedro Simón, this fact happened in Catia la Mar in January 1563.
