= Peruvian Civil War =

Peruvian Civil War may refer to the following:

- Peruvian Civil War of 1834
- Salaverry-Santa Cruz War
- War of the Confederation
- Peruvian Civil War of 1843–1844
- Liberal Revolution of 1854
- Peruvian Civil War of 1856–1858
- Peruvian Civil War of 1865
- Peruvian Civil War of 1867
- Salt Tax Revolt (Peru)
- Peruvian Civil War of 1884–1885
- Peruvian Civil War of 1894–1895
- Internal conflict in Peru (1980–)
