= 1886 Peruvian general election =

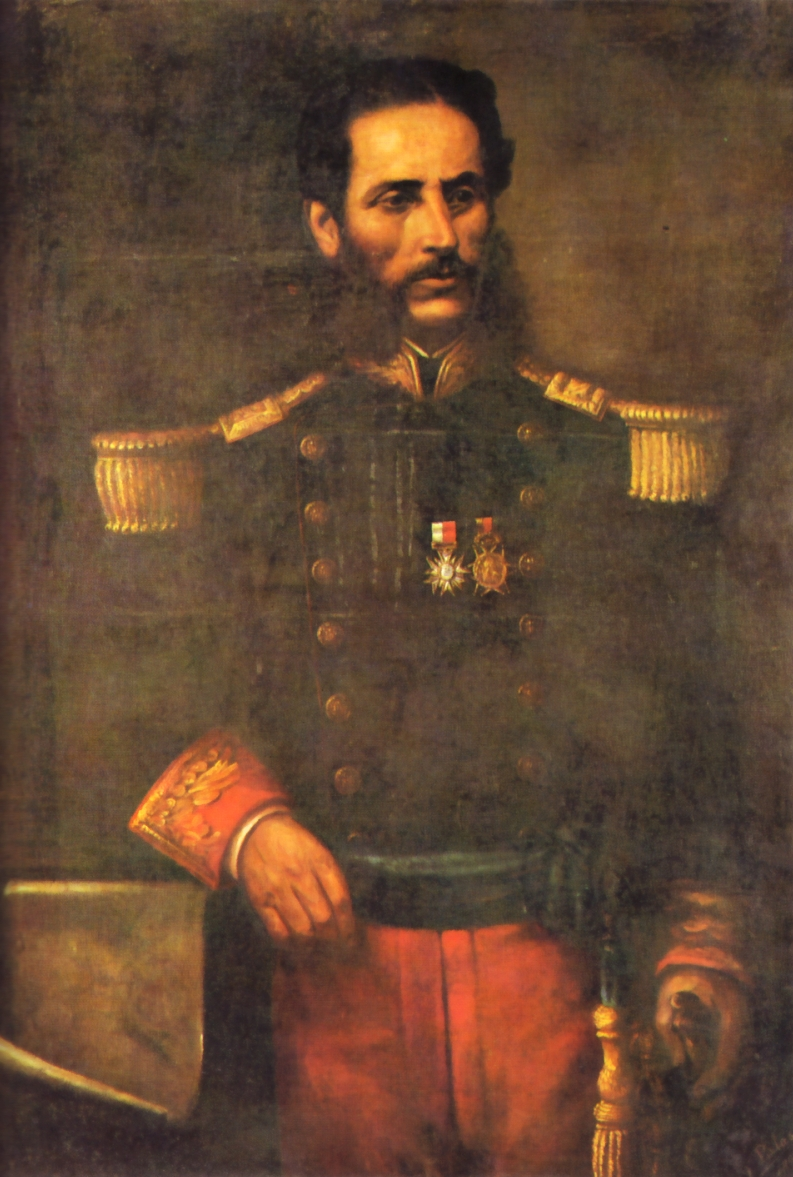
Portrait of General Andrés Avelino Cáceres by Nicolás Palas, 1894.

General elections were held in Peru in March 1886. Following the end of the Peruvian Civil War of 1884–1885, a decree was issued on 5 December 1885 calling for elections for the presidency and members of Congress. Victorious general Andrés Avelino Cáceres of the Constitutional Party was the only candidate for president. He was also supported by the Civilista Party, while supporters of Nicolás de Piérola in the Democratic Party boycotted the elections. Cáceres was inaugurated as president on 3 June.
