= Pedro Pablo Atusparía =

Peruvian-Quechuan military leader (1840–1887)

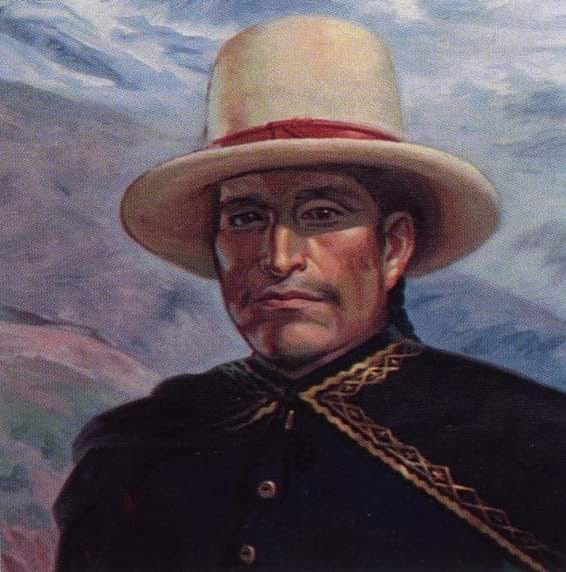
- Born: June 29, 1840; Huaraz, Ancash, Peru
- Died: August 25, 1887 (aged 47); Huaraz, Ancash, Peru
- Spouse: María Fernanda Yauri (m. 1869)
- Children: 4
- Military career
- Allegiance: Quechua Rebels
- Service years: 1885
- Conflicts: Huaraz Rebellion

Pedro Pablo Atusparía Ángeles (1840-1887) was a Peruvian politician and indigenous rights activist of Quechua descent. He was known for initially organizing the Huaraz Rebellion before being rehabilitated by the new government of Andrés Avelino Cáceres as part of the larger Peruvian Civil War of 1884–1885.

== Childhood ==
Pedro was born on June 29, 1840, at Huaraz to an unknown father of possible Mestizo descent and María Mallqui who was a domestic worker who worked at Jirón Sucre 201. The owner's wife of his birthmother's workplace, Doña Emperatriz Sender, decided to entrust Pedro to María Martina Ángeles who was a housewife and a native from Tuquipayoc and to Cayetano Atusparía who originated from Marián as his legitimate parents. They decided to take him to the baptismal font along with Manuel Alzamora who owned several pastures at Marián and his daughter Petronila.

According to native custom, when the son of an indigenous couple reaches a certain age, he would travel to a Misti to serve in promises of protection and education that he would provide. Pedro was thus handed over to his godfather Manuel Alzamora and taught how to dye jergas, baizes, cordellates and other woollen fabrics that the Quechua tended to market. Despite this, Pedro remained illiterate throughout most of his life; all his documents were signed by someone else at his personal request.

== Effects of the War of the Pacific ==
Atusparía married María Fernanda Yauri on October 9, 1869, and they had four children, their first child dying at a young age. By 1880, he was made deputy inspector of the Marián ranch but had a conflict with agent Manuel Mosquera and both ended up in a street fight. At Christmas 1884, an assembly held at the church of Huaraz and Atusparía elected him Mayor of the first district of the city, La Independencia which was put into effect at the New Year 1885. After the conclusion of the War of the Pacific, the Callejón de Huaylas was sacked and pillaged by the Chilean forces with the Battle of Huamachuco being the most major of the engagements in the valley. This led to the Peruvian Civil War of 1884–1885 between the governmental forces of Miguel Iglesias and Andrés Avelino Cáceres. While the neighboring towns were divided between the two, Huaraz was in full support of Iglesias as they appointed Francisco Noriega as prefect of the department but he became unpopular after enforcing unreasonable taxes as well as communal tasks assigned purely to Quechua.

== Huaraz Rebellion ==
The Quechua populace rejected these demands as the demand for four silver sols. The opposition grew large enough to the point where on February 22, 1885, Noriega granted a term of three days for the payment of the two sols per the first semester but Manuel Mosquera asked for a reduction on the taxes and the end of the communal tasks. When Atusparía was ordered to give the order for the Quechua to collect straw to repair the roofs of the houses, he refused to give the order and Noriega left the prefect with sub-prefect José Collazos in charge of the prefect. Immediately, Collazos ordered for the arrests of several mayors, including Atusparía within the prefect and had their braids cut off when it came time for their corregidores . The Quechua didn't take this kindly and began planning for an open revolt to capture the city of Huaraz as part of an open revolt against Collazos so that they could punish the Iglesistas who were in support of Collazos, steal from Tusán businesses for selling the few merchandise at the city for inflated prices and free Atusparía. The rebels gathered up few weaponry which were used during the War of the Pacific and the siege on the city began on March 2, 1885. Despite Collazos' best efforts to put down the rebellion, the Quechua initially succeeded and ordered a massacre on Collazos' forces and freed Atusparía from prison.

A proposal was made for Atusparía to become the new mayor of Huaraz but he declined the offer and gave the role to Mosquera who was also against Iglesias. The rebellion soon spread to neighboring towns and the Cordillera Negra with the works of Pedro Cochachín garnering more political support in the area. As a response, Iglesias appointed Colonel José Iraola as the new prefect and gave him a force consisting of two infantry battalions, two artillery brigades and a cavalry regiment as they arrived at Casma. A journalist known as Luis Felipe Montestruque made several articles titled "El Sol de los Incas" which claimed that the rebellion at Huaraz was intended to restore the Tahuantinsuyu and how the forces of Andrés Avelino Cáceres might support the rebellion.

A violent battle occurred at Huaraz on May 4, 1885, between the forces of Atusparía and Iraola but as Atusparía was wounded in the leg and took refuge in the house of Julio Aristibel as the forces of Iraola recaptured the city. Iraola offered the guarantee of Atusparía's life and he surrendered but other Quechua leaders chose not to surrender and would make violent attempts and recapturing the city, ending in the losses of many Quechua soldiers and the subsequent execution of the Uschu Pedro. After Cáceres defeated Iglesias at the civil war and caused him to be exiled from Peru, one of the first things he did was free Atusparía from prison and was invited to the Government Palace to discuss the events at Huaraz with Cáceres acknowledging the mistreatment of the Quechua.

== Later years and death ==
Atusparía later sent his son, Manuel Ceferino to his nation so that he would receive proper education and be consistently protected. On June 15, 1886, he went to Casma and proceeded to head for Huaraz. The remaining Quechua forces considered Atusparía to be a traitor to their cause but the local press and positive remarks from Cáceres lead to a relatively positive image for him. Atusparía's cause of death remains conflicted as some sources state that he was poisoned during a banquet while historian Manuel Salvador Reina Loli states that Atusparía fell victim to a typhus outbreak that broke out around the time of his death.
