= Entrada de Piérola a Lima por la Puerta de Cocharcas =

Painting by Juan Lepiani

Entrada de Piérola a Lima por la Puerta de Cocharcas, durante la Guerra Civil de 1894-1895
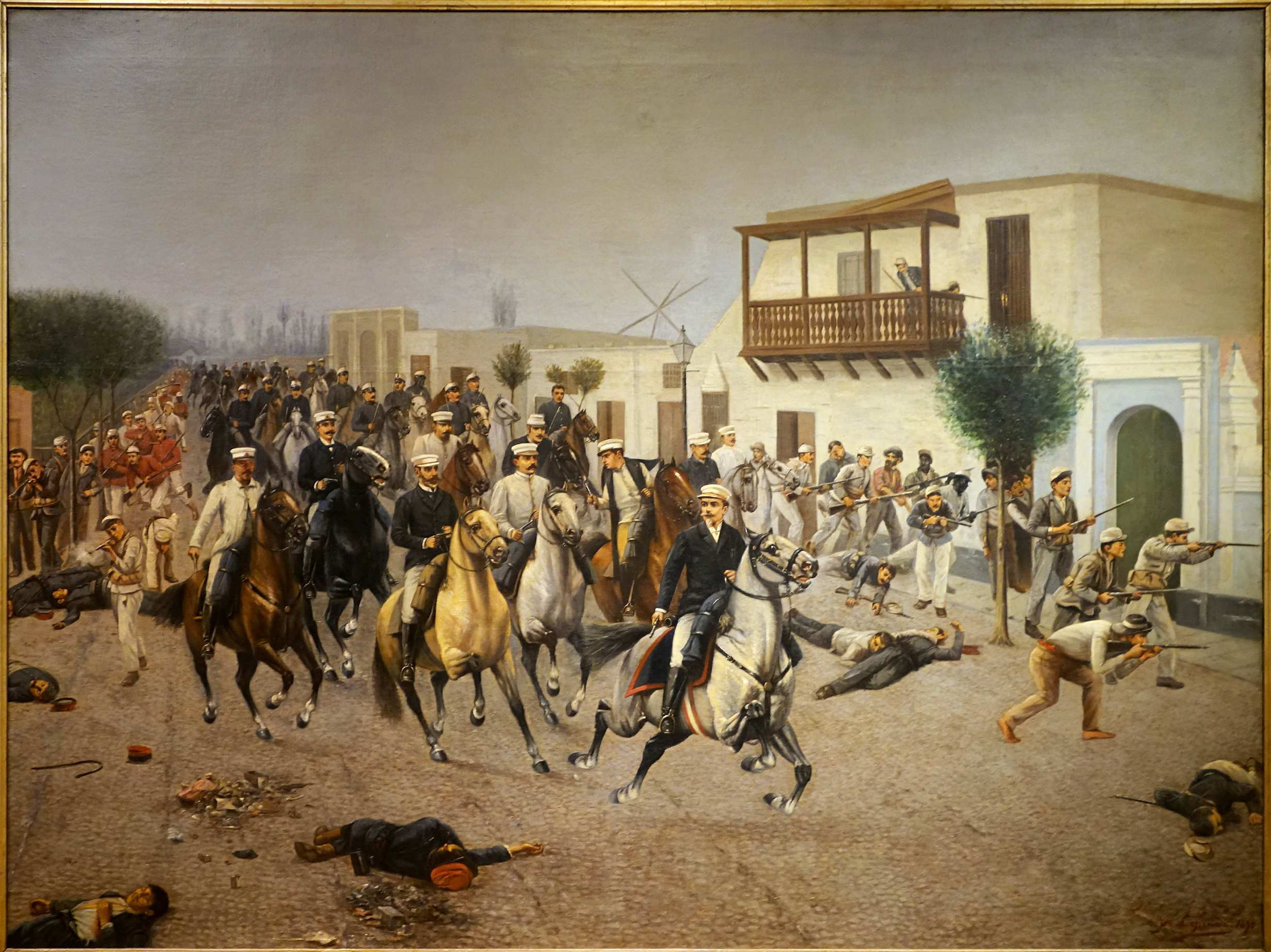
- Artist: Juan Lepiani
- Year: 1890 to 1900
- Medium: Oil on canvas
- Subject: Nicolás de Piérola
- Location: National Museum of Archaeology, Anthropology and History, Lima

Entrada de Piérola a Lima por la Puerta de Cocharcas, durante la Guerra Civil de 1894-1895 (Spanish for "De Piérola's entrance to Lima through the Gate of Cocharcas during the civil war of 1894-1895") is an oil painting by Juan Lepiani, painted from around 1890 to 1900. It forms part of the collection of the National Museum of Archaeology, Anthropology and History of Peru.

== Context ==
Lepiani's work portrays the entry of the rebel montoneras led by Nicolás de Piérola in Lima against the Peruvian Army of then president Andrés Avelino Cáceres in the Peruvian Civil War of 1894–1895 of the postwar era, after the War of the Pacific that pitted the republics of Peru and Bolivia against Chile.

The painting is characterized by being from the group that Lepiani dedicated to the events of both the war and post-war periods. The work is described as Peruvian "historical realism" by the University of the Pacific. The National Library of Chile has an official photograph of the painting in its archives.

== See also ==
- Peruvian Civil War of 1894–1895
