= Casa Hacienda Punchauca =

Historical monument in Peru

Coordinates: 11°50′02″S 77°00′04″W

Casa Hacienda Santiago de Punchauca
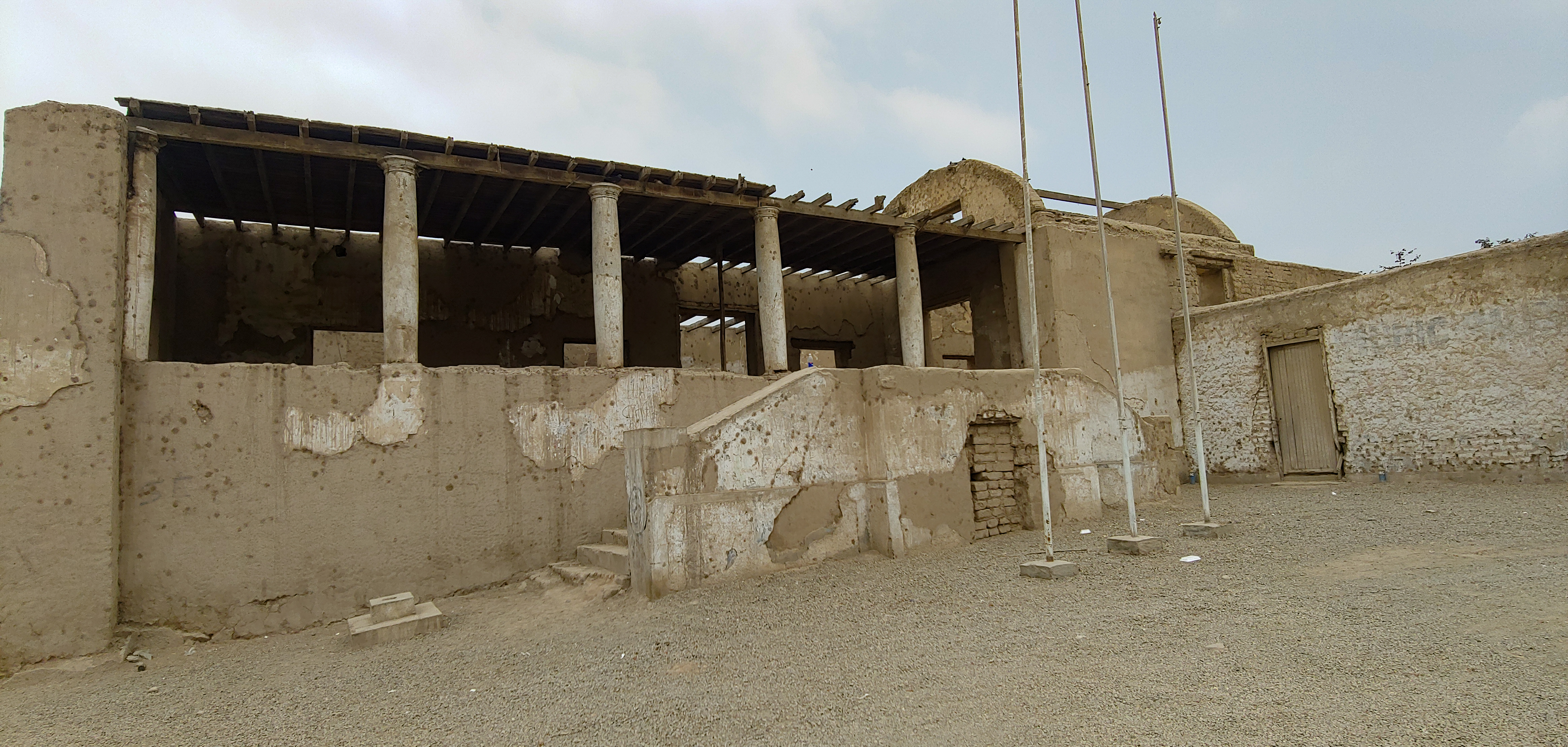
- The building in 2021
- Designations: Cultural heritage of Peru

The Casa Hacienda Santiago de Punchauca is a historic building at the 25th kilometre of the Lima–Canta Highway in Carabayllo District, Lima, Peru. The viceregal building was built over a Huaca and is part of the Cultural heritage of Peru since 1980.

== History ==
Named after its original owner and once owned by Nicolás de Ribera and Hipólito Unanue, it is the location of the conference of the same name between José de San Martín and José de la Serna, 1st Count of the Andes. Under the military government of Juan Velasco Alvarado, the building—already in a poor state, as its reconstruction was promoted by Raúl Porras Barrenechea—was expropriated as a consequence of the Peruvian Agrarian Reform.

== Gallery ==
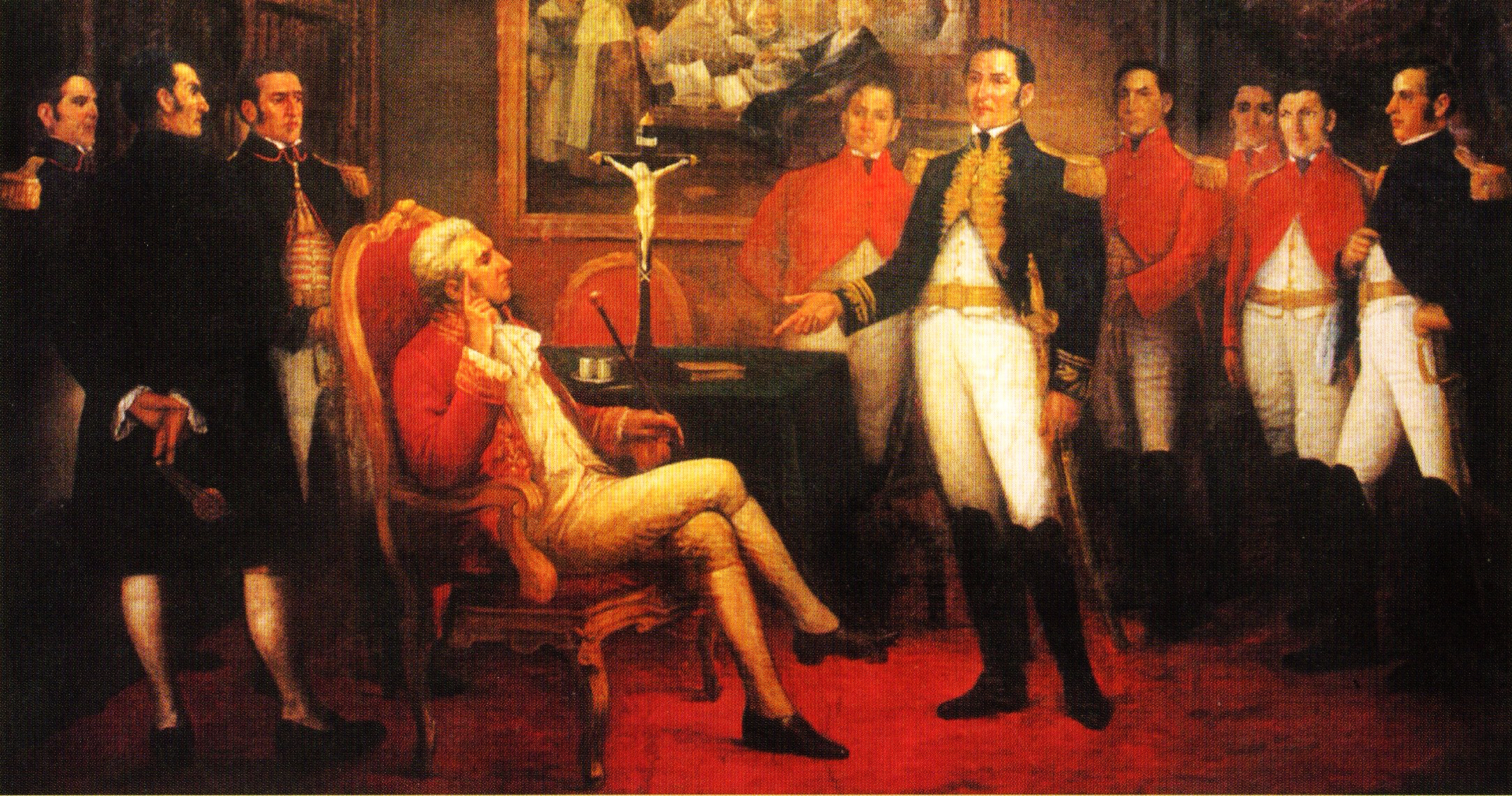
The conference in a painting by Juan Lepiani

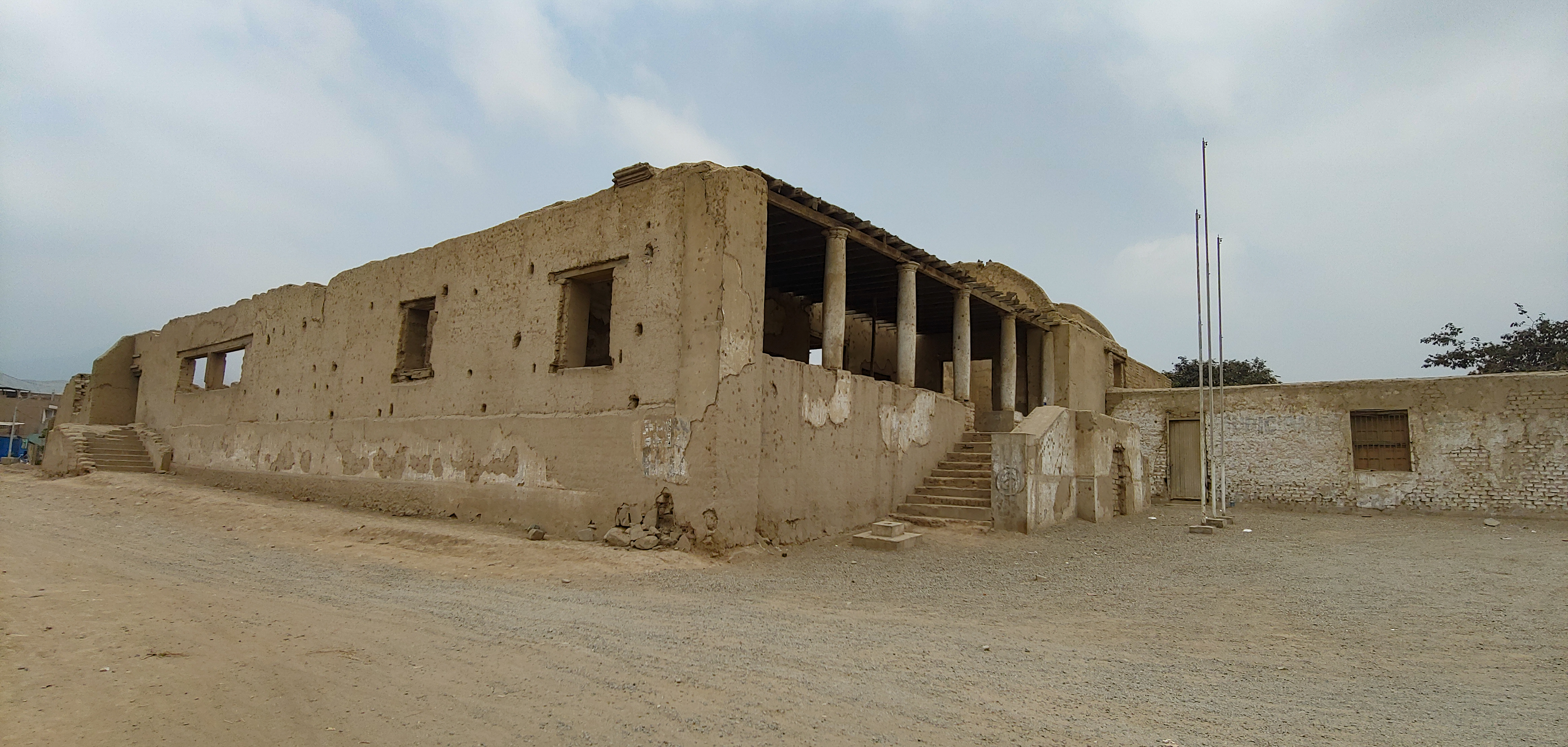
Lateral view in 2021

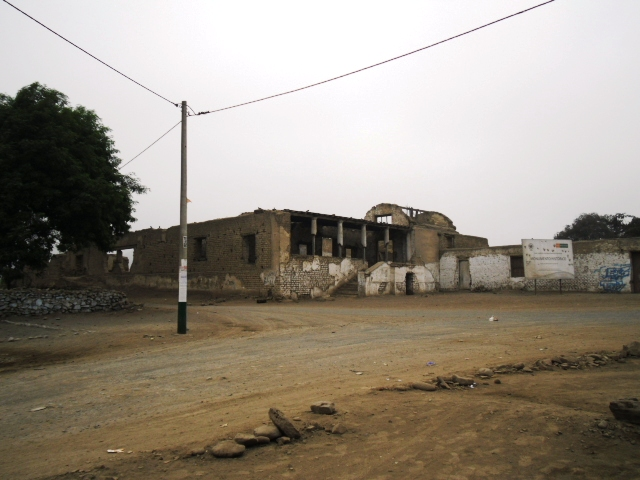
Ditto

== See also ==
- Peruvian War of Independence
