= Proclamación de la Independencia del Perú =

Painting by Juan Lepiani

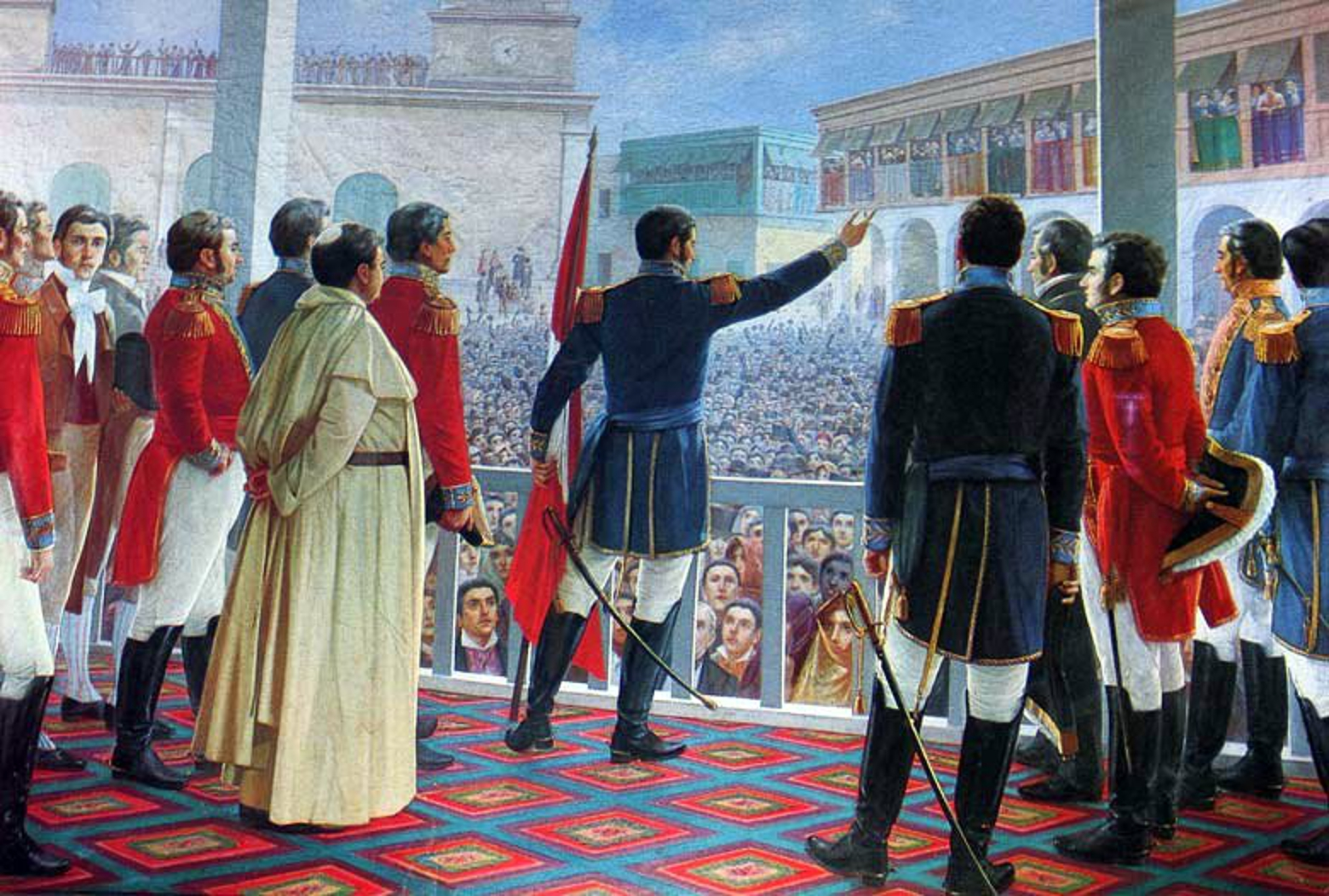
- Artist: Juan Lepiani
- Year: 1904
- Medium: Oil on canvas
- Subject: Independence of Peru
- Dimensions: 274,7 cm × 397,9 cm (1,081 in × 1,567 in)
- Location: National Museum of Archaeology, Anthropology and History of Peru, Pueblo Libre, Lima, Peru

Proclamación de la Independencia del Perú (Spanish for "Proclamation of the Independence of Peru") is an oil painting by Juan Lepiani painted in Rome in 1904. It forms part of the collection of the National Museum of Archaeology, Anthropology and History of Peru. The 2,747 cm × 3,979 cm (1,081 in × 1,567 in) painting is considered the most iconic painting about the South American country's war of independence.

== Context ==
Due to the difficulty that Lepiani had in making portraits due to the little documentation he had, he decided to paint the characters with his back turned, although maintaining certain features that make them recognisable. The painting depicts the scene taking place on a balcony of the Cabildo of Lima. In the middle, José de San Martín can be seen, holding the Peruvian flag with his left hand. Around him are the different political, military and religious authorities who attended the event, and on the esplanade the people of Lima listening to the words of San Martín.

According to research by art historian Luis Eduardo Wuffarden, it has been established that the only character on the balcony looking towards the viewer is Lepiani, who added a self-portrait to the painting.

Lepiani took some artistic liberties with the work, as the proclamation of independence was carried out on a stage in the Plaza Mayor itself and not on the cabildo's balcony as Lepiani painted. Similarly, the design surrounding the balcony does not match with the actual appearance of the city during the period. On the other hand, San Martín carries the flag that corresponds to the third design made by José Bernardo de Tagle in 1822.

== See also ==
- Peruvian War of Independence
