= Huaraz Rebellion =

1885–1887 conflict in South America

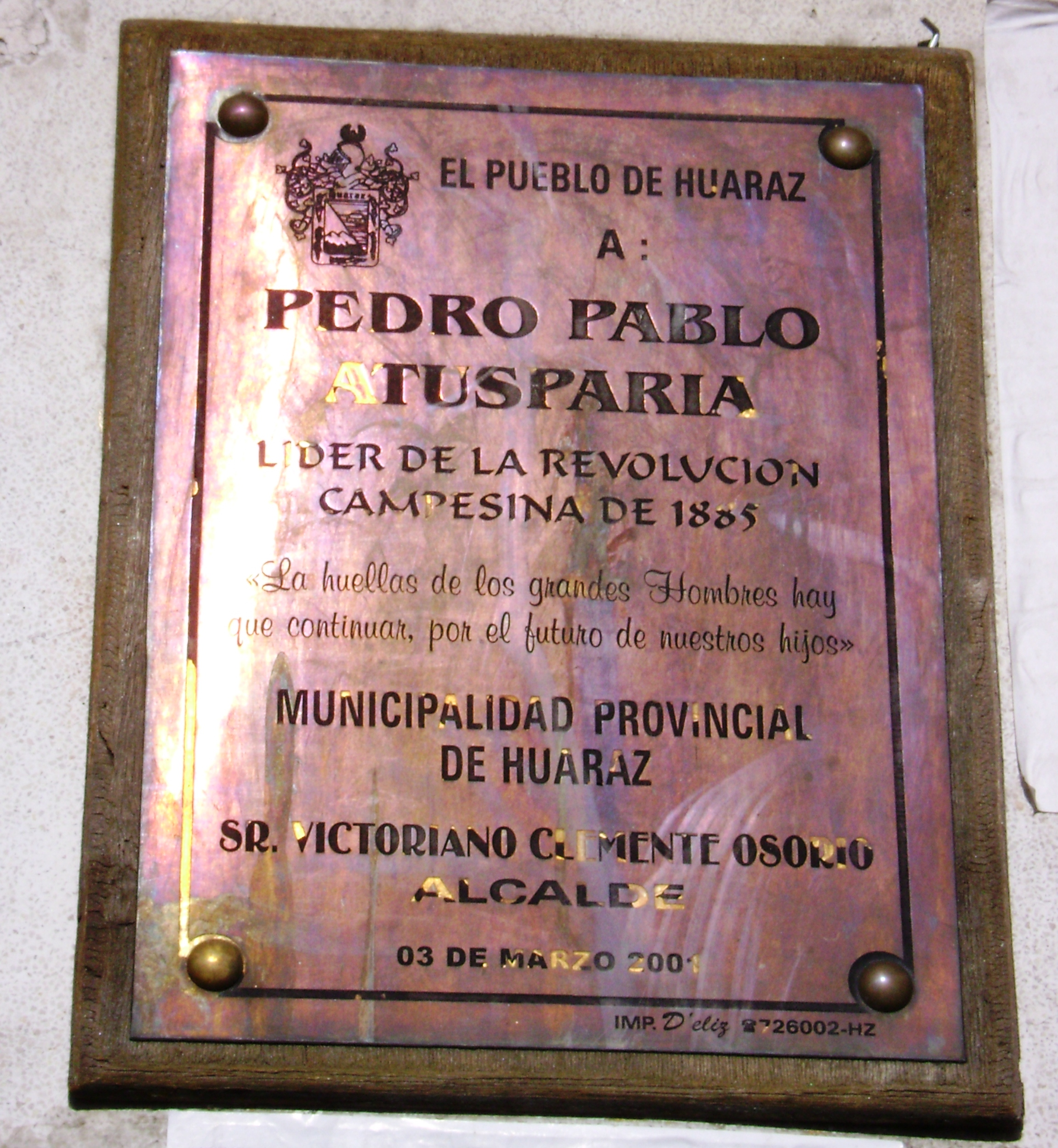
- Conmemorative plaque
Date	1 March 1885 – 28 September 1887
Location	Callejón de Huaylas, Peru
Result	Government victory

Belligerents
Peru	Quechua Rebels

Commanders and leaders
(Peru) Francisco Noriega (Peru) Javier Collazos (Peru) José Iraola	(Peru) Pedro Pablo Atusparía (surrendered) (Peru) Pedro Kochatzin (executed)

Strength
700 men 3 machine guns 1 cannon	10,000–20,000 peasants

Casualties and losses
	10,000 dead peasants

The Huaraz Rebellion was an insurrection started in 1885 by indigenous peasants against the Peruvian Republic. The cause for the conflict was the reestablishment of the indigenous tribute by the government of President Miguel Iglesias.

== Bibliography ==
- Dixon, Jeffrey S.; Sarkees, Meredith Reid (2015). A Guide to Intra-state Wars: An Examination of Civil, Regional, and Intercommunal Wars, 1816-2014. CQ Press. ISBN 978-1-5063-1798-4.
