= Peruvian Corporation =

The Peruvian Corporation Ltd. (alternate: Peruvian Corporation of London) was registered under the Companies Act in London on 20 March 1890. Its board of directors included ten members led by Sir Alfred Dent, G. A. Ollard, of Smiles and Co. Solicitors, was manager in London, T. E. Webb was Secretary, with Clinton Dawkins and William Davies (nephew of W. R. Grace and of Grace Brothers – Callao) as the first representatives in Peru. The company was formed with the purpose of cancelling Peru's external debt and to release its government from loans it had taken out through bondholders at three times (in 1869, 1870, 1872), in order to finance the construction of railways. The main purpose of the incorporation included acquiring the rights and undertaking the liabilities of bondholders.

== History ==
After winning independence from Spain in 1826, Peru was financially strapped. Over the decades financial problems worsened, and Peru needed money. In 1865 then 1866, bonds were issued that were retired with new bonds in 1869. More bonds were issued in 1870 but the 1869 bonds were not addressed. New bonds were again issued in 1872 and again previous bonds were not addressed.

A major problem, that would take many years to resolve, was that the rich guano deposits were used as security on all the bonds. Peru struggled to make bond interest payments but on 18 December 1875, Peru defaulted. The War of the Pacific (1879–1883) made matters far worse for the country and its creditors, and by 1889 something had to be done about the situation.

In London a group formed the Peruvian Corporation to try to resolve the issues and recoup invested money. The objectives of the company were extensive. They included the acquisition of real or personal property in Peru or elsewhere, dealing in land, produce, and property of all kinds, constructing and managing railways, roads, and telegraphs, and carrying on the business usually carried on by railway companies, canal companies, and telegraph companies. It also was involved in constructing and managing docks and harbours, ships, mines, beds of nitrates, managing the state domains, and acting as agents of the Peruvian Government.

=== Grace Contract ===
William Russell Grace and Michael P. Grace had formed the Grace Brothers & Co. (later the W. R. Grace and Company) in 1865, and had a vast business empire with interests in Lima, and Callo in Peru; as well as Valparaiso, Santiago, and Concepcion in Chile. By 1889 these interests included a large guano trade as well as Grace Line shipping. Moves to address the Peruvian financial crisis included the Elias-Castellon and Irigoyen-Delgado-Donoughmore protocols, that were formalized by 1890. Michael Grace and Lord Donoughmore were able to get the Grace Contract (originating in 1886) ratified in 1890 also.

==== Original terms ====
Terms of the Grace Contract were that the Peruvian Corporation took over the depreciated bonds of the Peruvian Government on the condition that the government-owned railroads and the guano exportation be under their control for a period of years. The bonds were exchanged for stock in the Peruvian Corporation. William Davies of Argentina and Peru, ran the Peruvian Corporation for W. R. Grace and Company. The corporation later surrendered the bonds to the Peruvian Government in exchange for the following concessions: the use for 66 years of all the railroad properties of the Peruvian Government, most important of which were the Southern Railway of Peru and the Central Railway of Peru; assignment of the guano existing in Peruvian territory, especially on certain adjacent islands, up to the amount of 2,000,000 tons; certain other claims on guano deposits, especially in the Lobos and other islands; 33 annual payments by the Peruvian Government, each of $400,000.

==== Modifications ====
In 1907, this arrangement was modified by an extension of the leases of the railways from 1956 to 1973, by a reduction in the number of annual payments from 33 to 30, and by a further agreement on the part of the Peruvian Corporation to construct certain railroad extensions to Cuzco and to Huancayo. The bonds of this corporation were largely held by English, French, and Dutch subjects. Consequently, the diplomatic representatives of these countries in Peru sought proper interest in the welfare of their nationals, the bondholders.

A new arrangement was created in 1955, whereby a Canadian company, the Peruvian Transport Corporation Ltd., acquired and held the outstanding share capital of the Peruvian Corporation. Empresa Nacional de Ferrocarriles del Peru (ENAFER) was formed in 1972, and was taken over by the government at the end of that year. The company's archives for the period of 1849-1967 are held at University College London.
