= Juan Lepiani =

Peruvian painter

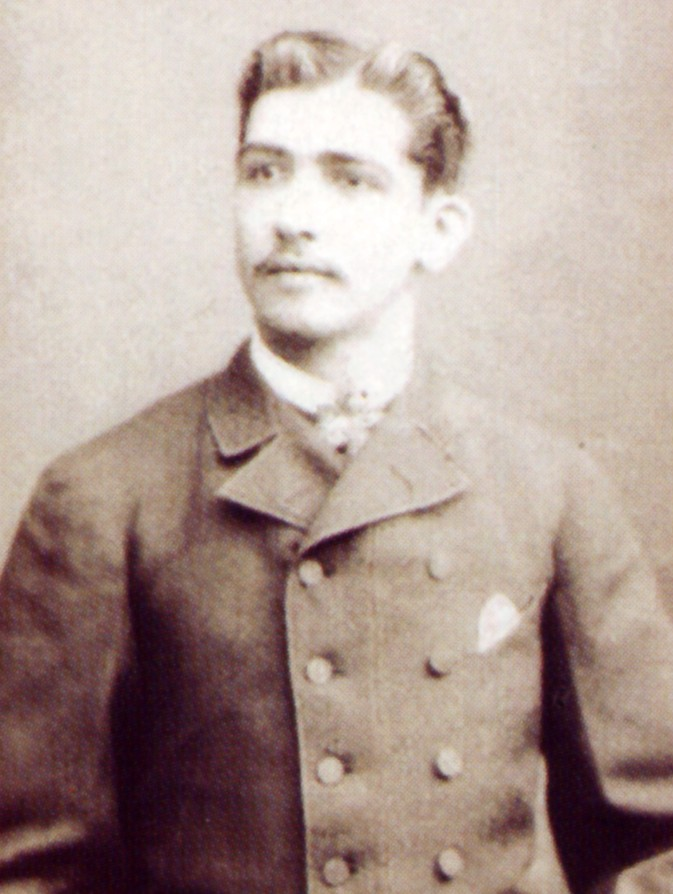
Juan Lepiani (c.1890)

José Juan de Dios Mateo Osbaldo Botaro Lepiani Toledo (20 September 1864, Lima – 28 November 1932, Rome) was a Peruvian painter. He is primarily known for historical and patriotic scenes; notably those related to the War of the Pacific.

== Biography ==
As a young man he worked at a series of simple jobs, such as paymaster for the central railroad. He considered art to be his natural vocation, however, so he began studying with Francisco Masías and Ramón Muñiz, a Spanish painter living in Lima, about whom little is known. In the 1890s, Lepiani began his series of historical scenes.

In 1903, he went to Europe, where he visited museums and exhibitions. He eventually settled in Rome, where he lived a somewhat dissolute life and created few original works, preferring instead to copy the Old Masters, such as Raphael and Titian, and sell the reproductions to American tourists. His copies were highly regarded, however, and some of the best ones were even sent home to Peru.

He returned home in 1928, prematurely old and almost blind from the arduous copying work; often done in poor light. The following year, he was back in Europe where his finances fell victim to the crash of '29. Penniless and totally blind, he died in Rome four years later.

Among his works depicting the War of the Pacific, the best-known include the death of Colonel Francisco Bolognesi at the Battle of Arica, Alfonso Ugarte riding his horse over a cliff to prevent the Peruvian flag from being captured, and a scene from the Battle of Miraflores where weaponless civilians rise to the defense of Lima. Although lesser known, he also created canvases related to the Spanish Conquest, the War of Independence and the coup d'état of 1895, led by Nicolás de Piérola.

== Gallery ==
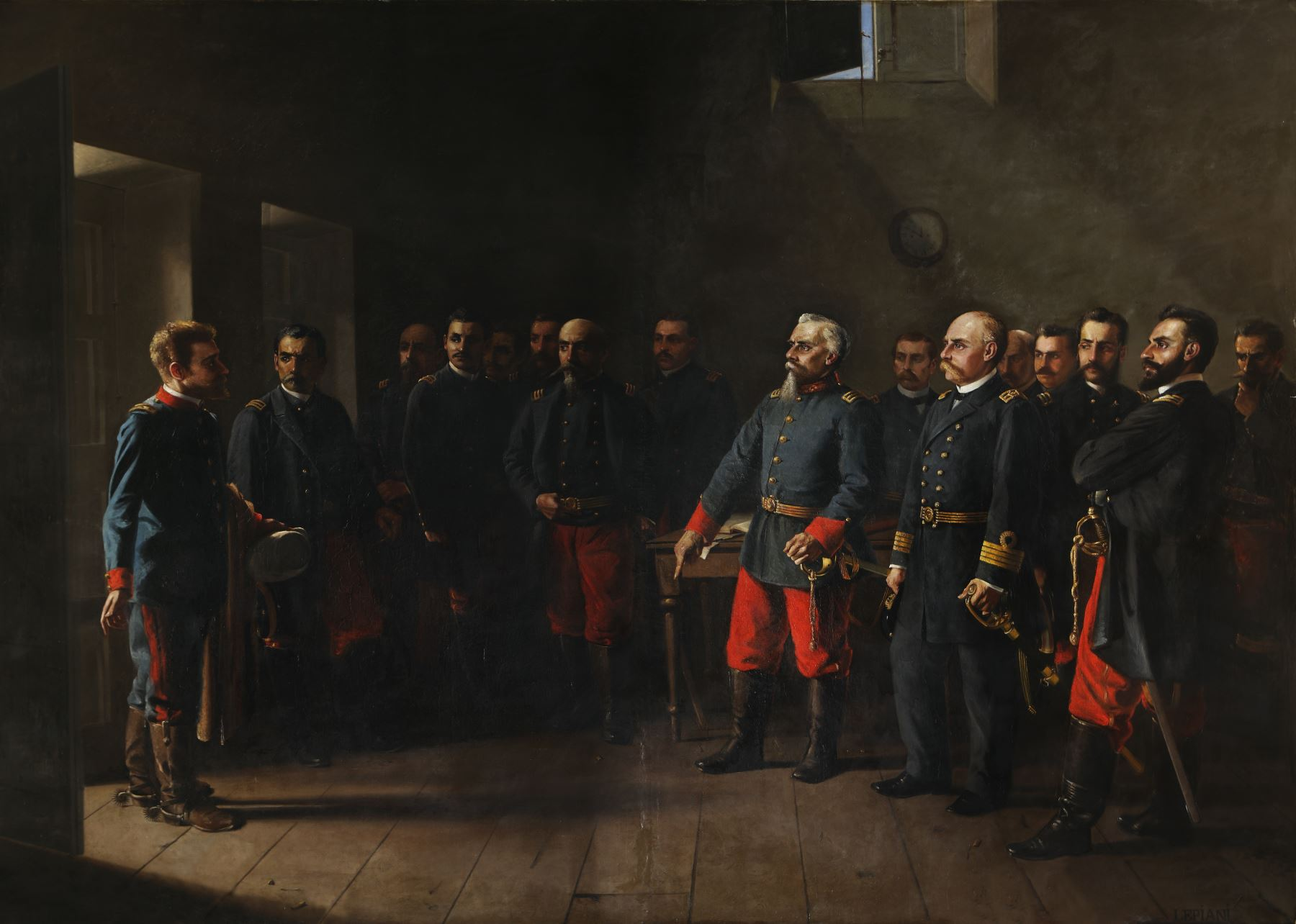
Francisco Bolognesi announces his intention to fight until the end (La respuesta, 1891)

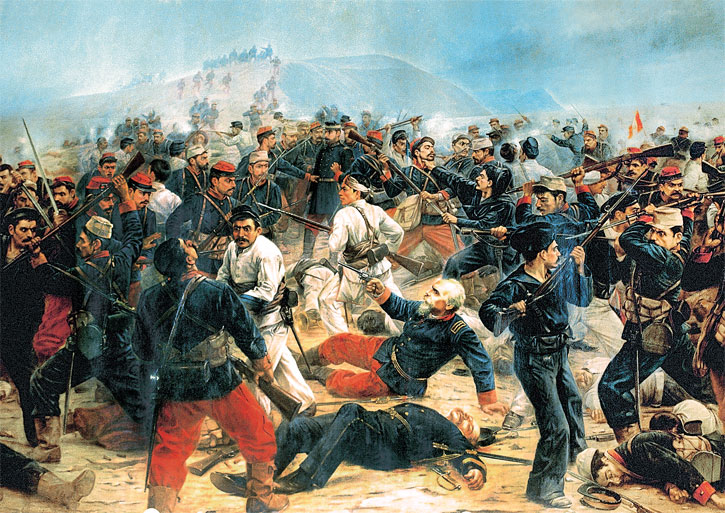
Bolognesi's death at the Battle of Arica (El último cartucho, 1899)

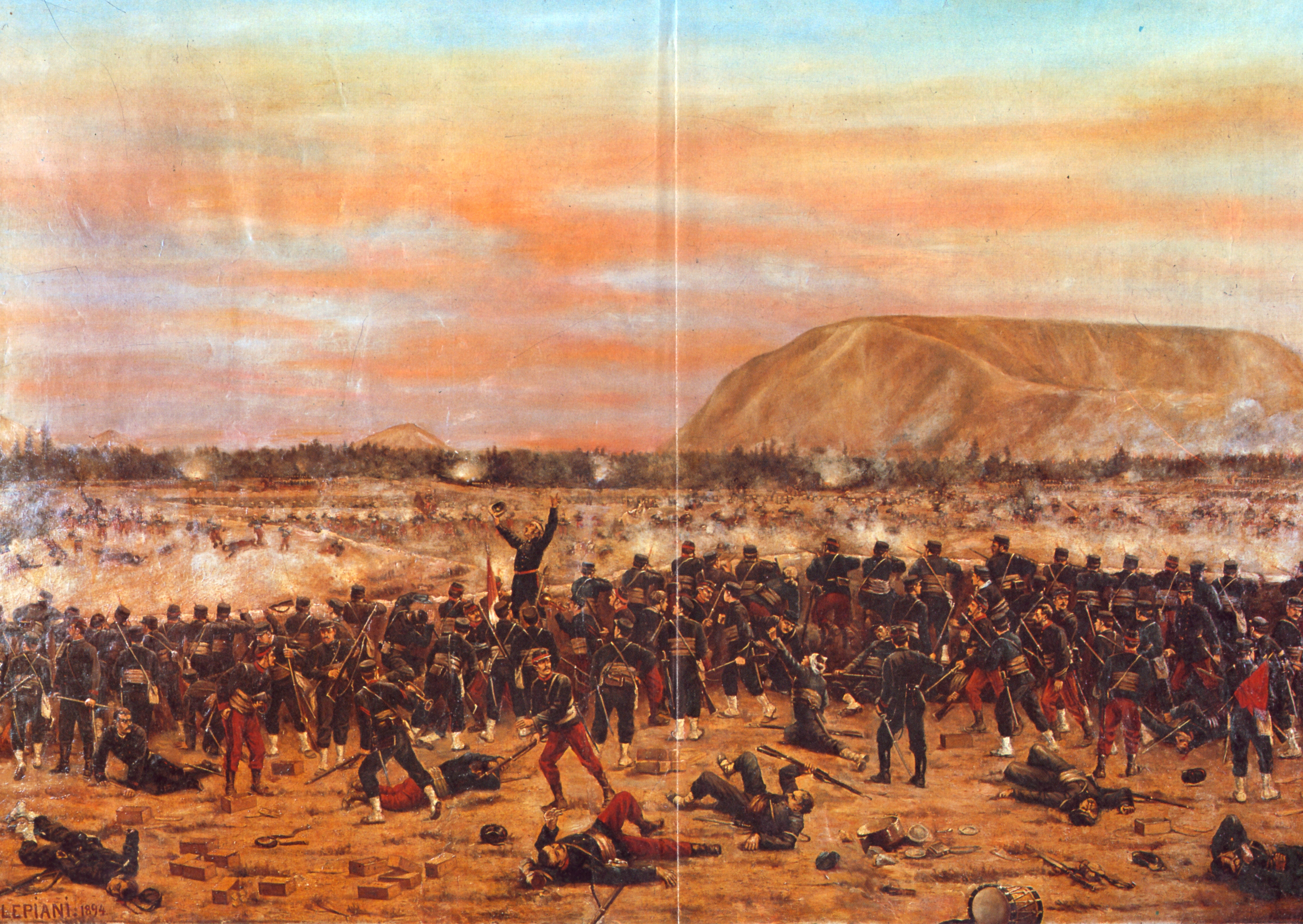
Scene of the Battle of Miraflores (La defensa del tercer reducto, 1894)

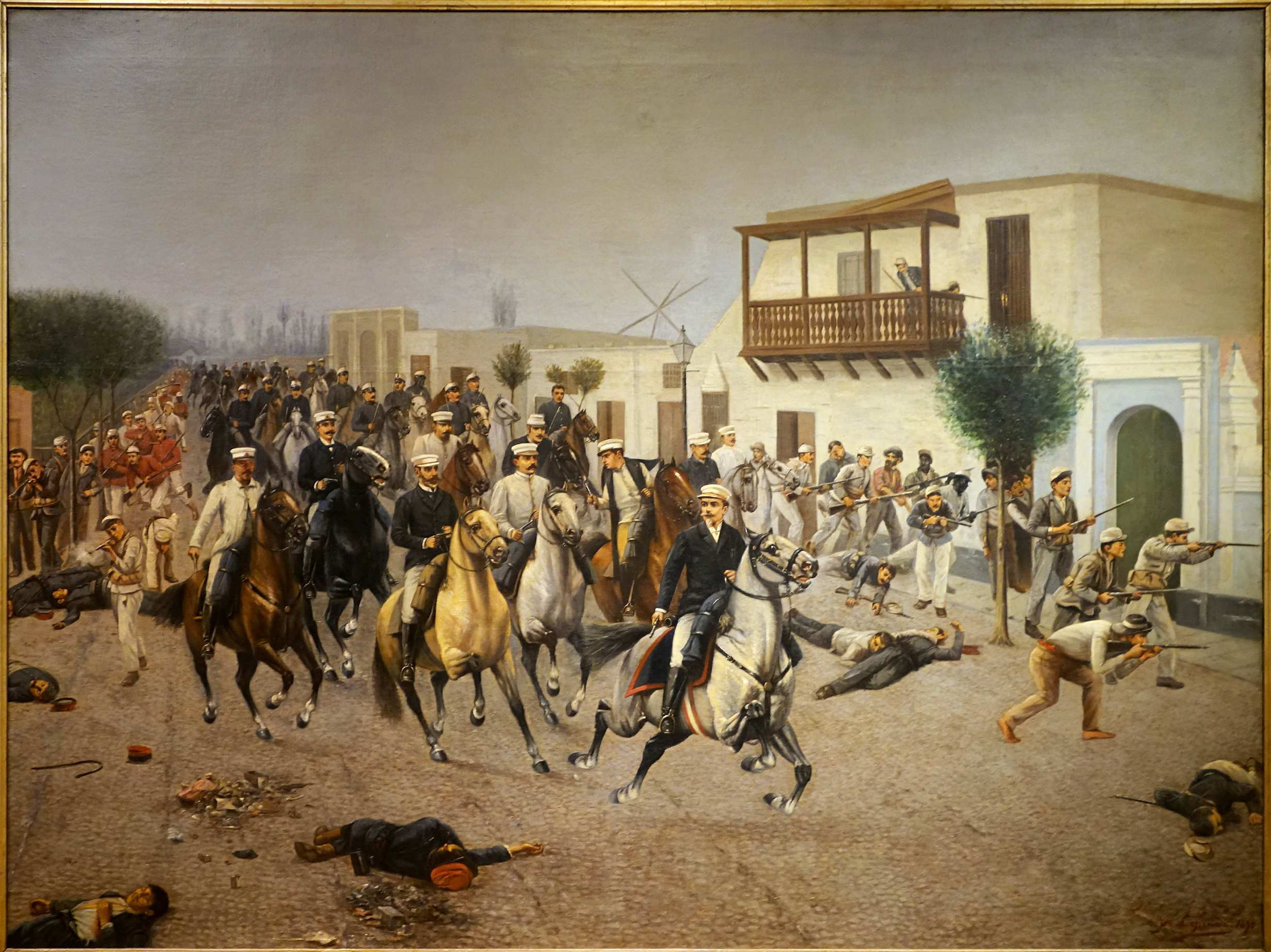
Scene of the 1895 conflict in Lima (Ingreso de Nicolás de Piérola por Cocharcas, 1895)

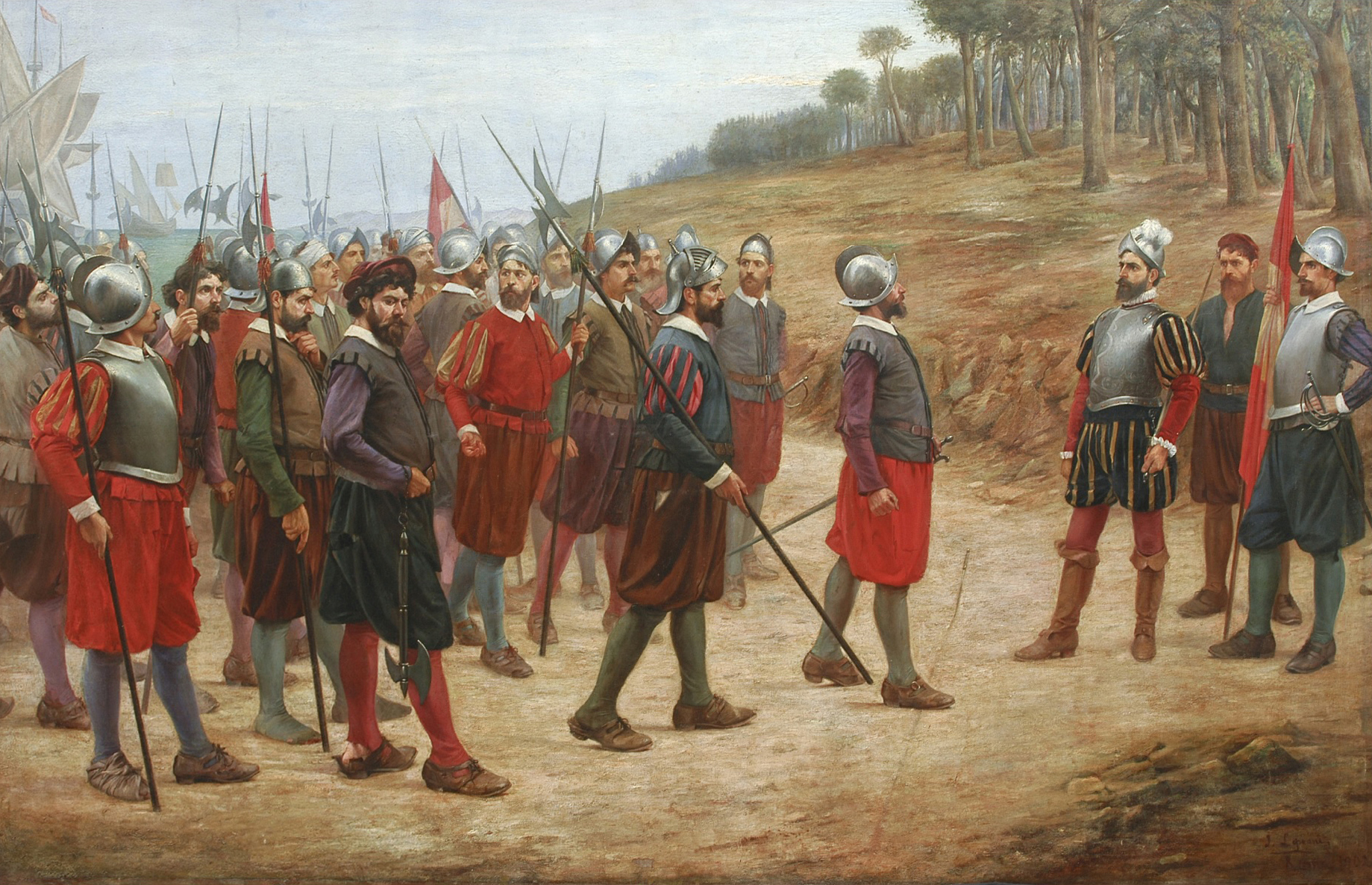
The "Famous Thirteen" with Francisco Pizarro (Los trece de la Isla del Gallo, 1902)

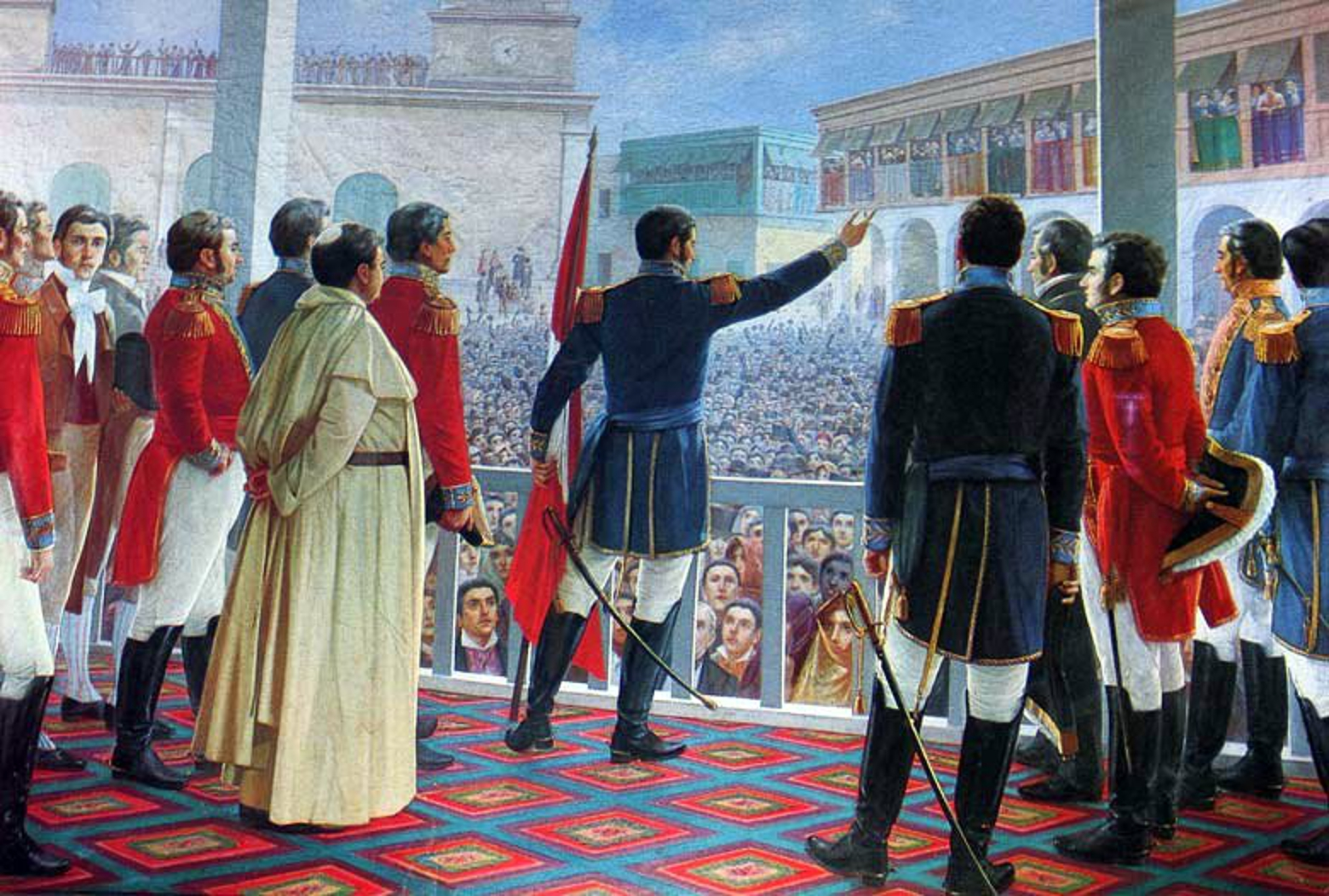
San Martín proclaims the independence of Peru (Proclamación de la Independencia del Perú, 1904)

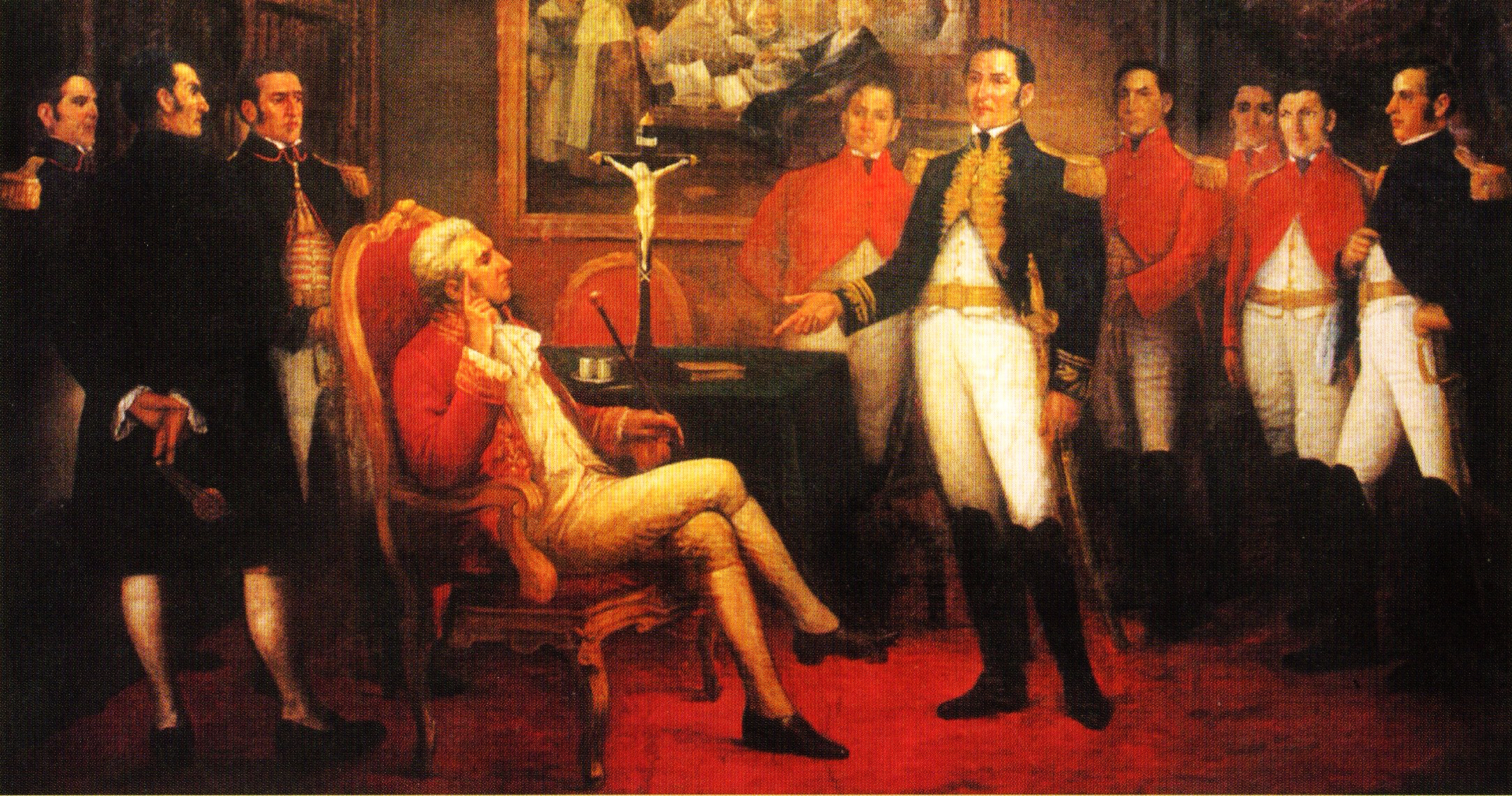
Peace negotiations between Viceroy la Serna and San Martín (La conferencia de Punchauca, c. 1921

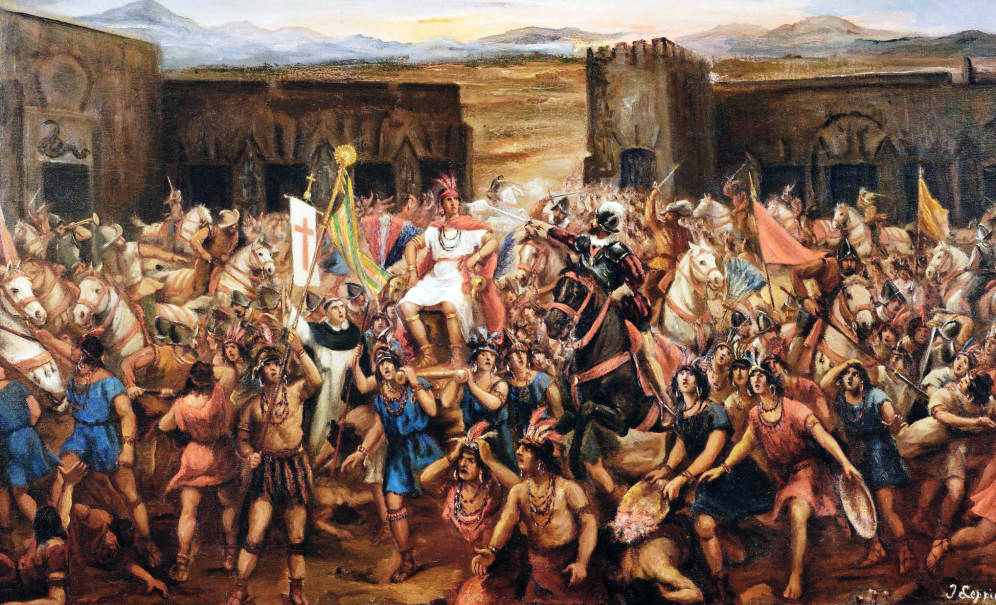
Atahualpa's capture in 1532 (La captura de Atahualpa, c. 1920s)

== See also ==
- Luis Montero Cáceres, another prolific painter

== Sources ==
- Jorge Basadre: Historia de la República del Perú (1822–1933), Vol.10, p. 292, Empresa Editora El Comercio S. A., Lima, 2005. ISBN 9972-205-72-X
- Alberto Tauro del Pino: Enciclopedia Ilustrada del Perú. 3rd. Ed., Vol. 9. Lima, PEISA, 2001. ISBN 9972-40-158-8
