= Grace Contract =

The Grace Contract was an 1886 pact between Peru and British bondholders to retire debts against Peru from bonds issued in 1870 (£7,400,000) and 1872 for £36,800,000. The bondholders formed the Peruvian Corporation in order to fulfill certain obligations as a guarantee to recoup losses from the defaulted bonds. The Grace Contract was not actually formalized until 1890.

== Debt ==
The Peruvian government accumulated substantial debt after gaining independence from Spain, and its defeat in the War of the Pacific further worsened its financial position. The war deprived Peru of territories rich in guano and nitrates, exports that gad generated approximately 70 percent of its customs revenue before the conflict, leaving the government with little leverage in negotiations with foreign creditors.

To settle these debts the government had secured several loans, primarily through Dreyfus Frérale and the Guano Syndicate. Loans were secured in 1865, 1866, 1869, 1870, and 1872. Proceeds from the massive £36,800,000 1872 loan were to be used to retire the 1865 and 1866 loans. There were issues concerning the legality of this loan as the Peruvian government had reportedly authorized President Balta to raise only £9.3 million so the 1866 and 1866 loan repayment was not authorized. The London Stock Exchange Committee intervened and restricted the loan to the amount authorized. In August 1872, Manuel Pardo became president and was a member of the anti-Dreyfus campaign in 1869. From 1872 until 1875 relations between the government and the Syndicate deteriorated and on December 18, 1875, Peru defaulted on bond payments, and normal payments were never resumed. The War of the Pacific made financial concerns even worse and in October, 1889, Peru signed the Grace Contract.

== Grace Brothers ==
William Russell Grace and Michael P. Grace had formed the Grace Brothers & Co. (later the W. R. Grace and Company) in 1865, and had a vast business empire with interests in Lima, and Callo in Peru; as well as Valparaiso, Santiago, and Concepcion in Chile. By 1889 these interests included a large guano trade as well as Grace Line shipping. Moves to address the Peruvian financial crisis included the Elias-Castellon and Irigoyen-Delgado-Donoughmore protocols, that were formalized by 1890. Michael Grace and Lord Donoughmore were able to get the Grace Contract (originating in 1886) ratified in 1890 also.

== Terms ==
The contract included the Peruvian government, the Chilean government, and British bond holders.

=== Peruvian government ===
The Peruvian Corporation agreed to cancel Peru's debt in exchange for £80,000 ($400,000) in annual payments, mining rights, and ownership of the Peruvian rail for 66 years. The corporation also agreed to build 160 kilometers of new railroad.

=== Chilean government ===
The Chilean government agreed to concede to the bondholders the guano deposits of Huanillos, Punta de Lobos, Pabellon de Pica (Caleta Pabellón de Pica), and Lobos de Afuera, give up claim on 80% of guano money held in English banks (£1,000,000), and place a moratorium on Chilean guano sales for four years. The total concessions of the Chilean government amounted to £2,250,000.

=== Other creditors ===
The Grace Contract did not settle the debts of the Guano Syndicate and the leader, Col. J. T. North (d. 1896-05-05) did not live to see repayment. These debts were not even attempted to be settled until an international arbitration tribunal at Lausanne in 1901 and a further payment after a decision at the International Court of Justice at The Hague in 1921.

== New era ==
Consequently, British financial domination of Peru was confirmed and Peru experienced a new flow of investments that quickened the country's economic recovery. Of importance was the rehabilitation of the railways and their extension to valuable mining centers such as La Oroya.
