= La captura de Atahualpa =

Painting by Juan Lepiani

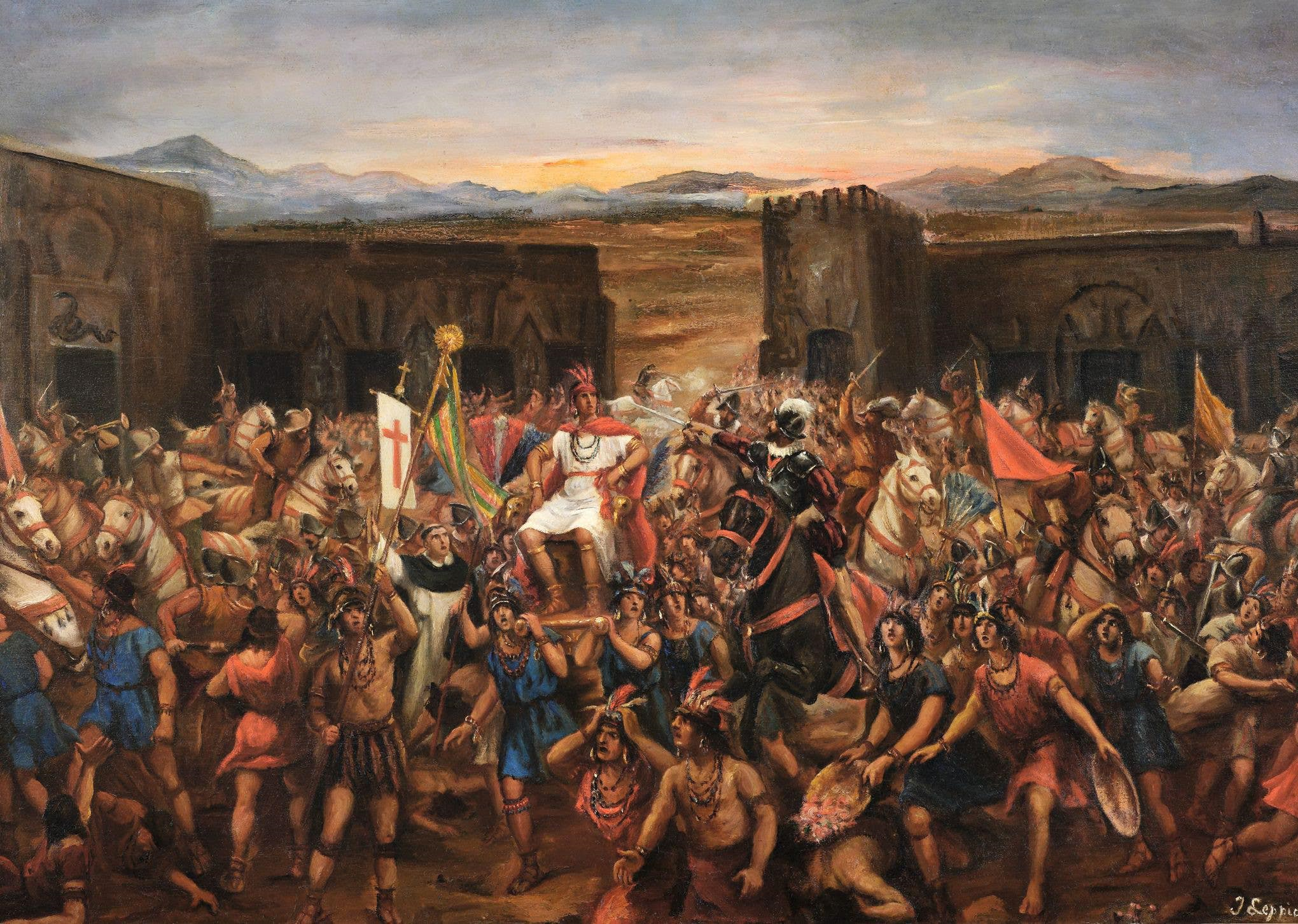
- Artist: Juan Lepiani
- Year: c. 1920–1927
- Medium: Oil on canvas
- Subject: Battle of Cajamarca
- Location: Lima Art Museum, Lima

La captura de Atahualpa (Spanish for "The capture of Atahualpa") is an oil painting by Juan Lepiani painted in the 1920s. It is part of the pictorial collection of the Lima Art Museum (MALI). It is part of the art collection of Lima Art Museum (MALI).

== Context ==
Lepiani's work portrays the Spanish ambush in Cajamarca against Atahualpa's delegation at the end of the civil war and at the dawn of the fall of the Inca Empire.

The painting was done on a 60 x 85 cm canvas, and created sometime between 1920 and 1927. It was part of the private collection of Ricardo Blume, who at the beginning of the 21st century decided to donate it, along with other works under his possession, to the galleries of the Lima Art Museum.

The work had its first international exhibition at the Musée du Quai Branly – Jacques Chirac in France, between June and September 2015.

== See also ==
- Spanish conquest of the Inca Empire
