= 1894 Peruvian presidential election =

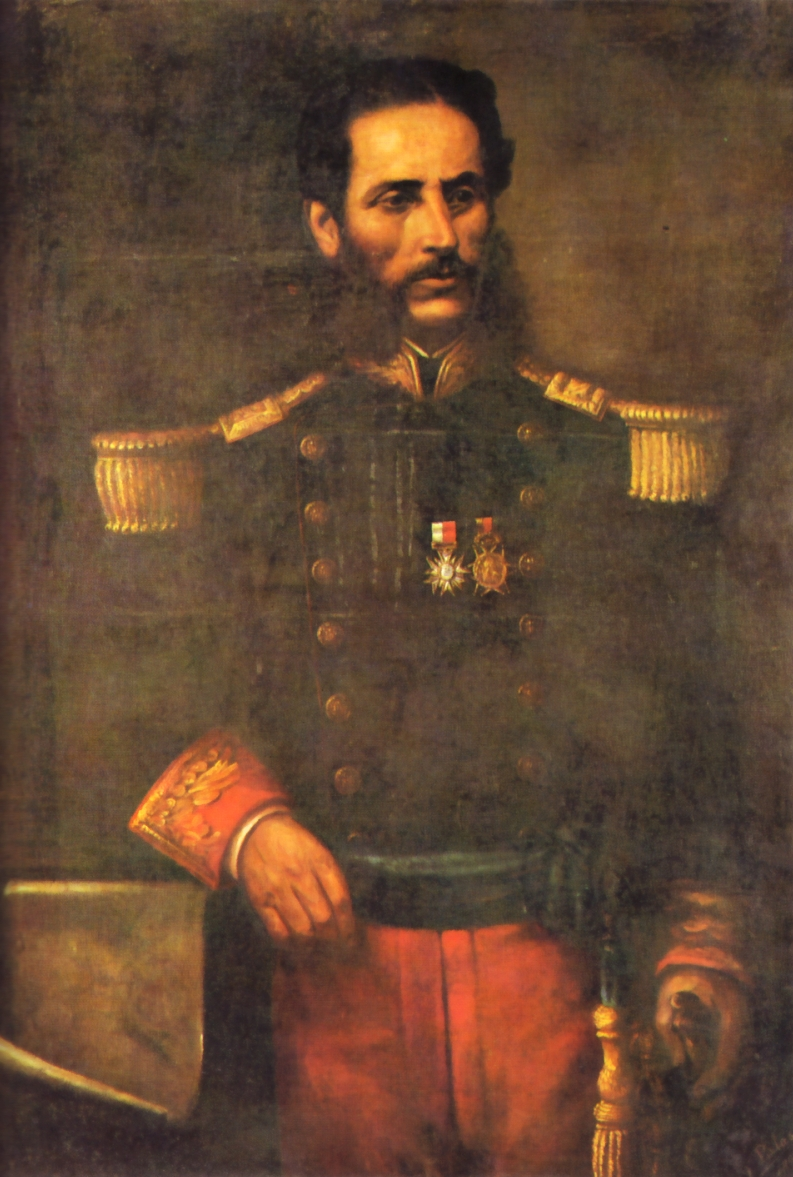
Portrait painting

Presidential elections were held in Peru in 1894. Andrés Avelino Cáceres of the Constitutional Party was elected unopposed.

== Results ==
Candidate	Party	Votes	%
Andrés Avelino Cáceres	Constitutional Party	4,539	100.00
Total		4,539	100.00
Valid votes		4,539	99.96
Invalid/blank votes		2	0.04
Total votes		4,541	100.00
Source: Tuesta
