= Peruvian Civil War of 1884–1885 =

Civil war in Peru

- Part of Peruvian National Reconstruction
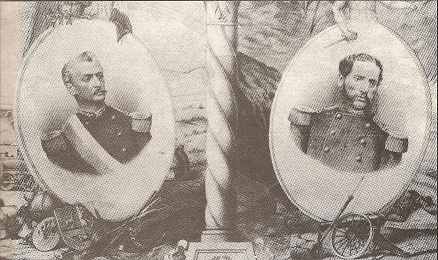
- The two rivals after the War of the Pacific, Miguel Iglesias (liberal) and Andres A. Càceres (conservative)
Date	August 27, 1884 - December 3, 1885
Location	Peru
Result	Cacerista victory: General elections are held in which Cáceres wins.; Restoration of the Constitution of 1860.; Beginning of the period known as National Reconstruction.; Surrender and exile of Miguel Iglesias and Nicolás de Piérola.

Belligerents
Conservatives; Supported by: Bolivia	Liberals; Supported by: Chile; Brazil; United Kingdom

Commanders and leaders
Andrés A. Cáceres; César Canevaro; Morales Bermudez	Miguel Iglesias (surrendered); Gregorio Relayze (executed); Nicolás de Piérola (surrendered)

Strength
800 (1884); 4,000 (1885)	2,000 (1884); 6,000 (1885)

The Peruvian civil war of 1884–1885 was an internal Peruvian conflict. It erupted as a result of the ratification of the Treaty of Ancón, which ceded the Arica and Tacna provinces to Chile after the lost War of the Pacific.

== Background ==
The rivalry between Andrés Avelino Cáceres and Miguel Iglesias began in the middle of the war with Chile. Both were distinguished soldiers, IIglesias had fought in the Lima campaign and won the Battle of San Pablo. While Cáceres had been victorious in the Battle of Tarapacá and was the commander of the Peruvian Breña campaign.

After several defeats, Iglesias signed the Treaty of Ancón with the Chilean government, which ended the war with the transfer of part of Southern Peru to Chile, and became president of Peru in 1883. Cáceres, although defeated by the Chileans in Huamachuco, kept resisting high in the central mountains, until the Chileans returned to their homeland.

Cáceres ended up accepting peace with Chile as a fait accompli, but did not recognize the government of Iglesias, which he considered imposed by the invaders. The supporters of Cáceres were called the "reds" and those of Iglesias the "blues" because of the color of the military kepi. They were also known as Caceristas and Iglesistas, respectively. He began preparations for what he called the Constitutional Campaign, since he proposed to restore the Constitution of 1860. He organized his headquarters in Huancayo.

== History ==
=== First stages of the war ===
In the first campaign of the civil war, Cáceres and 800 of his Breñeros attacked Lima on 27 August 1884, managing to take some strategic positions. But since they did not have enough forces and military elements to face the well-equipped Iglesias' troops, they were repulsed by the division of Colonel José Rosas Gil, some 2,000 soldiers strong. Furthermore, the expected support by the people of Lima didn't materialise.

In the north of the country, the city of Trujillo was occupied by Cacerist forces under the command of Captain Gregorio Miró Quesada, but then suffered an attack by superior Iglesias' forces on 8 October 1884. The combat lasted two days, ending with the defeat of the Cacerists and the death of Miró Quesada.

=== Events arond Arequipa ===
After his defeats, Cáceres fled to Arequipa, where he entered amidst the acclaim of the people. Here, he reorganized his forces and appointed General César Canevaro as Secretary General, who replaced the cabinet of ministers he had had since the beginning of his campaign. He received help from the President of Bolivia and his personal friend, General Narciso Campero, who, recognizing him as the legitimate president of Peru, sent him 2,000 rifles. By the end of March 1885, Cáceres had built and equipped a brand new army of some 4,000 men, with Colonel Remigio Morales Bermúdez as its commander. The army left Arequipa heading to Andahuaylas and then continued to Ayacucho, a city where it arrived on 30 April.

Iglesias, confident in his superiority of his forces, decided to undertake the offensive. He sent an army of 4,000 men against Cáceres under the command of Colonel Gregorio Relayze. They advanced to the region of La Oroya in the central mountains, an area where Cáceres had won several battles against the Chilean invaders.
Cáceres selected around 2,000 men from his army, whom he ordered to engage the Iglesias' forces in a delaying combat in the vicinity of Jauja. Immediately afterwards, they had to withdraw, pretending to be defeated. This battle took place on 13 November 1885, and indeed, the Iglesistas, convinced of their triumph, reported their victory to Lima by telegraph and advanced to Huancayo.
However, Cáceres had installed the best of his forces in Huaripampa on the right bank of the Mantaro River, 4 km southeast of Jauja. From there they marched along rough terrain towards La Oroya, where they surprised the garrison defending that railway center and cut all bridges over the Mantaro. Relayze and his army were thus isolated in the Mantaro Valley, unable to leave the department of Junín, as all routes to the coast had been cut.

Cáceres now launched his surprise attack towards Lima, using the railway lines as transport. A Cacerist detachment, under the command of frigate captain José Gálvez Moreno, captured a train loaded with weapons, ammunition and supplies in Chicla, which thus passed into the hands of the Cáceres army.

=== Battle of Lima (1885) ===
On 28 November 1885, Cáceres and his forces appeared outside Lima and launched their final assault. By this time, the people of Lima welcomed Cáceres and joined him. Fighting between Cáceres' and Iglesias' forces continued into 29 and 30 November. On 3 December 1885, with his control of Lima reduced to only the Government Palace, Iglesias resigned and went into exile.

== Bibliography ==
- Basadre Grohmann, Jorge: Historia de la Republic of Peru. 1822 - 1933, Octava Edición, corregida y aumentada. Tomo 8. Editada por el Diario "La República" de Lima y la Universidad "Ricardo Palma". Impreso en Santiago de Chile, 1998.
- Basadre, Jorge (2005a). Historia de la República del Perú. 4.º periodo: La guerra con Chile (1879-1883) 9 (9.ª edición). Lima: Empresa Editora El Comercio S. A. ISBN 9972-205-71-1.
- Basadre, Jorge (2005b). Historia de la República del Perú. 5.º periodo: El comienzo de la Reconstrucción (1884-1895) 10 (9.ª edición). Lima: Empresa Editora El Comercio S. A. ISBN 9972-205-72-X.
- Chirinos Soto, Enrique: Historia de la Republic (1821-1930). Tomo I. Lima, AFA Editores Importadores S.A., 1985.
- Guerra, Margarita: Historia General del Peru. La República Aristocrática. Tomo XI. Primera Edición. Editor Carlos Milla Batres. Lima, Peru, 1984. Depósito Legal: B. 22436-84 (XI).
- Tauro del Pino, Alberto: Enciclopedia Ilustrada del Peru. Tercera Edición. Tomo 8, HAB/IZQ. Artículo: HUARIPAMPA. Lima, PEISA, 2001. ISBN 9972-40-157-X
- Clements Markham (1892). A history of Peru.
