= Nicolás de Piérola =

President of Peru variously in the late 1800s

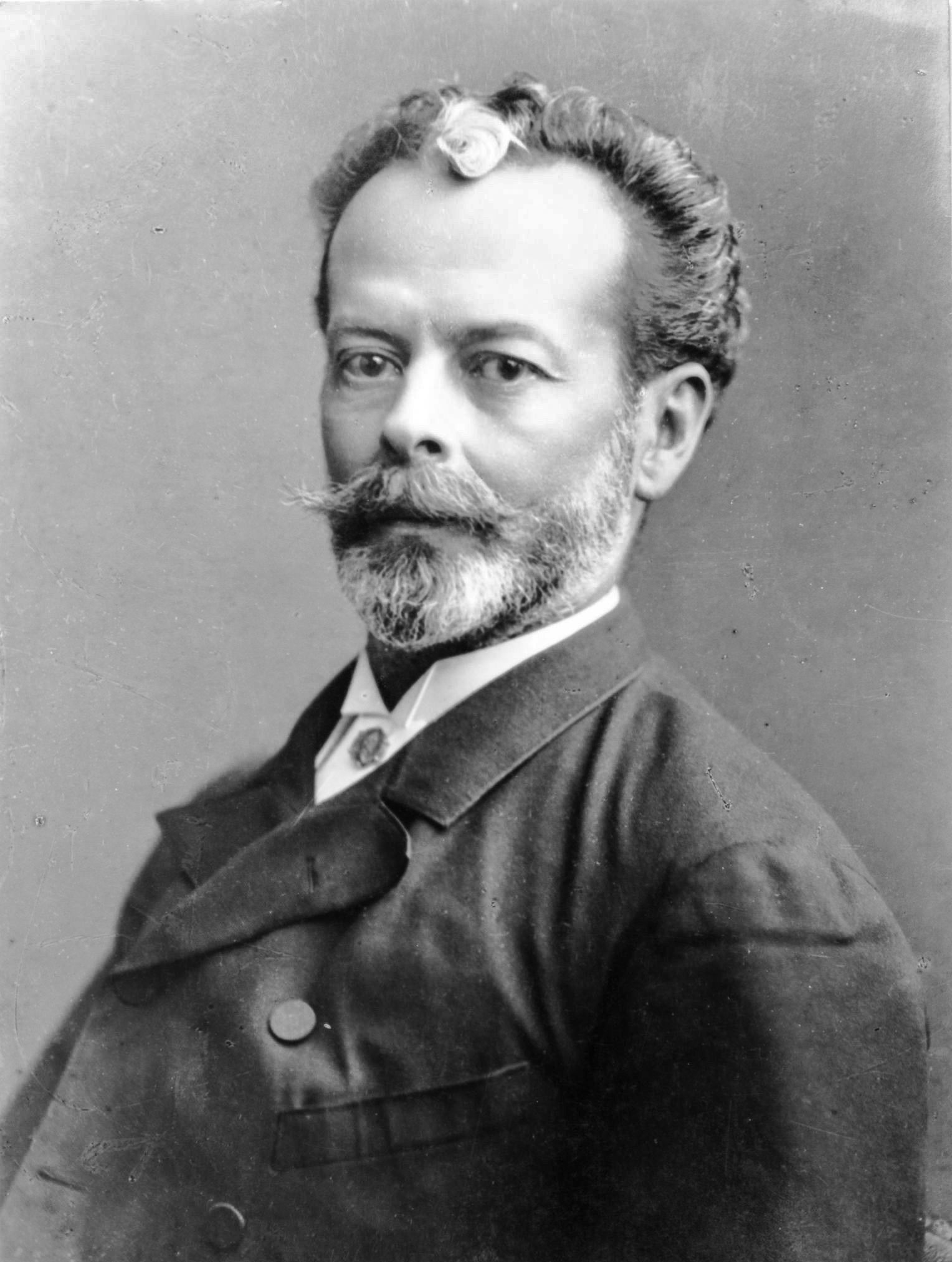

Supreme Chief of Peru (War of the Pacific)
- In office December 23, 1879 – November 28, 1881
- Preceded by: Luis La Puerta
- Succeeded by: Francisco García Calderón

President of Peru
- In office September 8, 1895 – September 8, 1899
- Prime Minister: Antonio Bentín y La Fuente; Manuel Antonio Barinaga; Manuel Pablo Olaechea Guerrero; Alejandro López de Romaña Alvizuri; José Jorge Loayza
- Vice President: Guillermo Billinghurst; Augusto Seminario Váscones
- Preceded by: Manuel Candamo
- Succeeded by: Eduardo López de Romaña

Personal details
- Born: January 5, 1839 Arequipa, Peru
- Died: June 23, 1913 (aged 74) Lima, Peru
- Party: National Party (1882-1884); Democratic Party (from 1884)
- Spouse: Jesusa de Iturbide

José Nicolás Baltasar Fernández de Piérola y Villena (known as "El Califa", "The Caliph"; January 5, 1839 – June 23, 1913) was a Peruvian politician and Minister of Finance who served twice as President of the Republic of Peru, from 1879 to 1881 and from 1895 to 1899.

He founded the Democratic Party in 1889. In 1895, he overthrew the Andrés Avelino Cáceres government. As president, he implemented various political and economic reforms.

== Early years ==
Nicolás de Piérola was born and educated in the southern Peruvian city of Arequipa. He was the son of an "aristocratic, but impoverished, ultra-Catholic family." He moved to Lima to study theology at the Seminario de Santo Toribio, and later obtained his law degree from the Faculty of Law. His parents died in 1857.

He married Doña Jesusa de Iturbide, believed to be the illegitimate daughter of Agustín Jerónimo de Iturbide y Huarte, the son of Emperor Agustín de Iturbide of Mexico. She died in 1914, one year after Piérola's death, in the house in the jirón Áncash he had purchased in 1869.

== Political life ==
=== Minister of Economy ===
From 1868 to 1871, he became Minister of Finance under President José Balta. He requested, from the Parliament, broad powers in order to negotiate with several companies and to get the best possible deal. The result of his negotiations, the so-called "Hires Dreyfus" treaty was signed with a French company, the "Dreyfus Brothers".

The treaty granted the Dreyfus house of Paris the monopoly of the Peruvian guano exports. Though successful at first, he was later accused and impeached under Pardo's administration of misappropriating funds, but was honorably acquitted of the charge of dishonest practice after he managed to obtain the support of Congress.

=== Coup attempt against Prado ===
On May 6, 1877, in an attempt to overthrow the government of Mariano Ignacio Prado, the ironclad "Huáscar" was seized at Callao port by followers of de Pierola. Led by the retired Navy Captain Germán Astete, it took part in the inconclusive Battle of Pacocha in which, at the helm of the monitor "Huáscar", they were forced to flee by two British ships, the "Amethyst" and the "Shah".

"Huáscar" surrendered to the government two days later, after almost one month of sabotage actions. Piérola was taken to Callao after he surrendered, he preferred to remove himself to Valparaíso and later to Europe.

== War of the Pacific ==
=== Coup against Prado ===
Piérola was finally allowed to come back to Peru in 1879, taking advantage of the War of the Pacific (1879–1883) with Chile. In the course of these deliberations, President Mariano Ignacio Prado left his vice president, Luis La Puerta in charge of the government and decided to leave for Europe to buy more armament and secure more money for the war. Many Peruvians (and parts of the Armed Forces) took this as an excuse for his inability to govern in the middle of the war.

During the course of these events, Piérola took advantage of President Prado's absence and proclaimed himself "Supreme Commander in Chief" on December 21. With part of the Army supporting his actions, he launched a successful coup d'état, with heavy fighting and casualties between both factions. Piérola assumed full power on December 23, 1879.

=== Supreme Commander-in-Chief ===
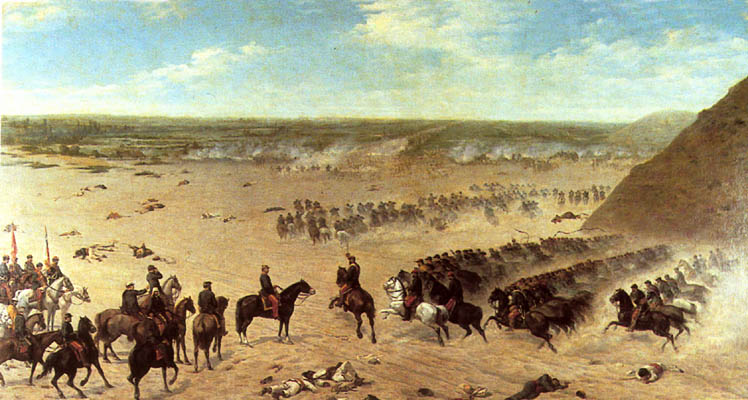
Chilean charge during the Battle of San Juan.

Piérola, after securing the loyalty of the troops that were in the capital, launched a ruthless campaign to censor the press. "El Comercio", the oldest newspaper in the capital, did not appear for 3 years. The Army was purged, and in several cases the seniority was ignored. Officers loyal to Pierola were put in charge based only in their political allegiance rather than experience. General Andrés Avelino Cáceres and Admiral Lizardo Montero Flores viewed their influence severely diminished.

After several defeats that the Peruvian Army suffered in Tacna and Arica, Piérola ordered what was left of the Army to protect the capital. The Peruvian army and poorly armed citizens that volunteered to the fight were set up to defend Lima. Fooled by the enemy, Piérola expected a Chilean assault from the north of the city, and marched with a large contingent of troops to the city of Ancón.

In the end, the Chilean assault was launched from the south. In this way, and with no reinforcements available, the Peruvian forces were defeated in the battles of San Juan and Miraflores, and the city of Lima fell in January 1881 to the forces of General Baquedano. The southern suburbs of Lima, including the upscale beach area of Chorrillos, were sacked and burned to the ground.

After Chilean forces invaded Lima in 1881, Piérola had to abandon the capital and leave for Ayacucho, yet was unsuccessful commanding Peruvian forces from there also. To make matters worse, Chile had never recognized his government. Chile installed its own Government in Lima, and Piérola was soon forced to resign in the midst of the conflict on November 28 of that same year. What remained of his forces was gathered by Andrés Avelino Cáceres, who was able to launch a guerrilla war against the invading Chilean forces.

== Reconstruction ==
=== Coup against Cáceres ===
However, this was not the end of Piérola as he would prove himself president of Peru years later as the leader of the Democratic Party of Peru, which he had founded in 1889. In 1894, after associating his party with the Civil Party of Peru to organize guerillas with fighters to occupy Lima, he ousted Andrés Avelino Cáceres, who had taken control of the government after the death of Remigio Morales Bermúdez, whose Vice President was prevented by Cáceres from taking office. Pierola was successful in overthrowing Cáceres and once again became president of Peru in 1895. The politician's second coup became very controversial for it was realized in a messianic and very violent fashion: over a thousand people were murdered in what was supposed to be Pierola's triumphal entry into Lima.

=== Presidency ===
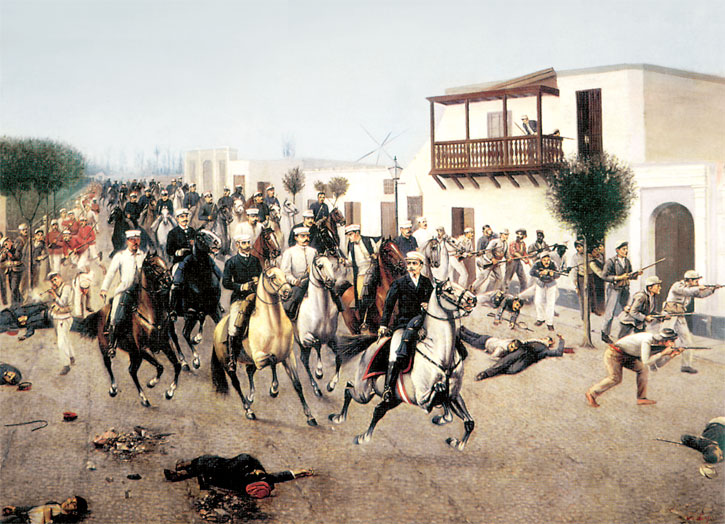
Piérola and his followers enter Lima in 1895. Painting by Juan Lepiani.

For the Peruvian Elections of 1895, Piérola's platform included several members of the Civil Party, and thus he was not challenged by any other candidate. He was elected President after receiving 4150 votes out of 4310 valid votes.

It is generally accepted that his Presidency inaugurated the "Aristocratic Republic", a period in which the economic and political "elite" was the sole and undisputed ruling class of the country. This period was marked with the reconstruction of a devastated Peru by initiating fiscal, military, religious, and civil reforms.

One of his most successful reforms was the issuing of the "Libra Peruana", gold currency of the same value as the British Sovereign, which gave Peru unprecedented monetary stability. The country started a slow but steady economic reform that effectively minimized the recession, while at the same time allowed an effective modernization of the State. He also sponsored the immigration of Japanese citizens to Peru.

Thus, his second term was successfully completed in 1899 and, in the same year, Eduardo López de Romaña, a prominent member of the Civil Party, was elected president.

=== Post-presidency ===
In 1900, Pierola intended to return to politics, this time running for the Mayorship of Lima. This was widely seen as a terrible political mistake, since he was defeated by an independent coalition led by Agustín Elguera. He ran again for the presidency in 1904, but withdrew before the election took place. His influence in politics faded away and he made another political mistake by supporting his brothers Carlos, Isaías and Amadeo in their attempt to overthrow President Augusto B. Leguía.

His political influence continued to decline during his final years. He died in Lima in 1913. In the 1990 presidential election, his great-nephew Nicolás de Piérola Balta (also a great-grandson of President José Balta) was a candidate.

== See also ==
- Politics of Peru
- List of presidents of Peru

Political offices
Preceded by Mariano Ignacio Prado	President of Peru ("Supreme Commander-in-Chief"); 1879–1881	Succeeded by Francisco García Calderón
Preceded by Manuel Candamo	President of Peru; 1895–1899	Succeeded by Eduardo López de Romaña
