= President of the Congress of the Republic of Peru =

Peruvian government position

President of the Senate of the Republic of Peru
- Presidencia del Senado de la República del Perú
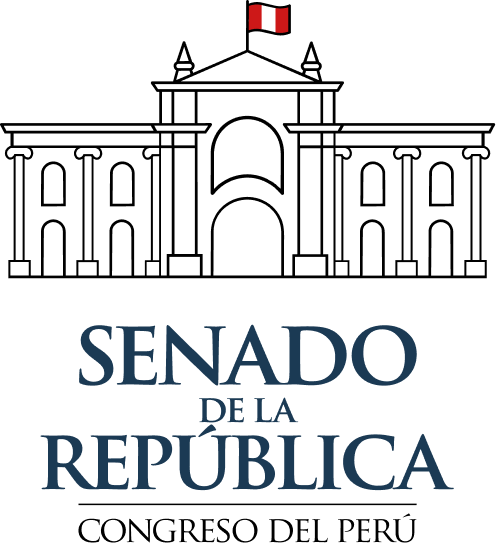
- Parliamentary Logo

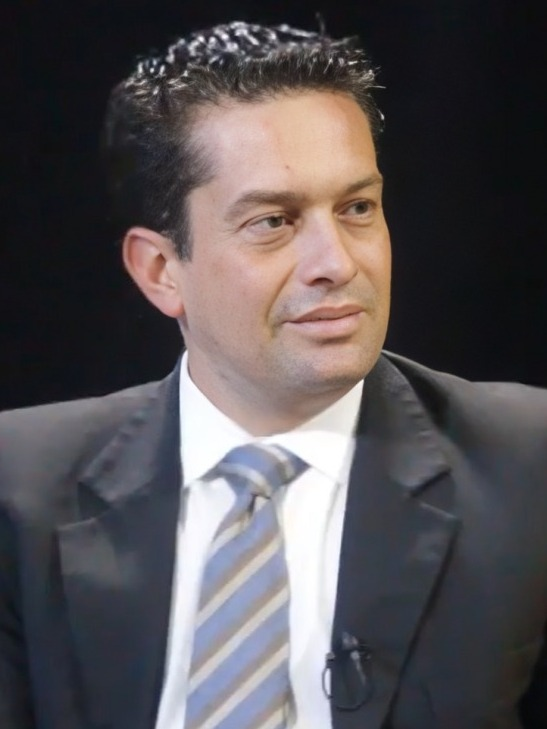
- Incumbent; Miki Torres since 26 July 2026
- Residence: Legislative Palace
- Seat: Lima
- Term length: 1 year, renewable
- Inaugural holder: Francisco Xavier de Luna Pizarro
- Formation: 20 September 1822
- Succession: Third
- Deputy: 1st Vice President of the Senate; 2nd Vice President of the Senate; 3rd Vice President of the Senate
- Website: congreso.gob.pe

President of the Chamber of Deputies of the Republic of Peru
- Presidencia de la Cámara de Diputados de la República del Perú
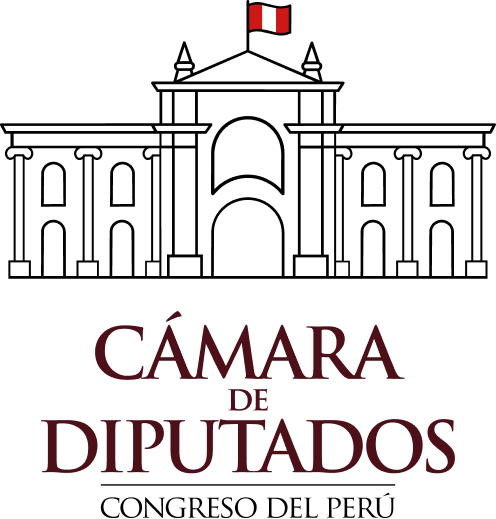
- Parliamentary Logo
- Incumbent; Óscar Reto since 26 July 2026
- Residence: Legislative Palace
- Seat: Lima
- Term length: 1 year, renewable
- Inaugural holder: Andrés Reyes y Buitrón
- Formation: 18 March 1828
- Succession: Fourth
- Deputy: 1st Vice President of the Chamber of Deputies; 2nd Vice President of the Chamber of Deputies; 3rd Vice President of the Chamber of Deputies
- Website: congreso.gob.pe

The president of the Congress of the Republic of Peru is the highest authority in the Congress of the Republic of Peru.

The president of the Senate of the Republic of Peru is the presiding officer in the Senate of the Republic of Peru.

The president of the Chamber of Deputies of the Republic of Peru is the presiding officer in the Chamber of Deputies of Peru, given the task of directing debates in the chamber, the political control and inspection of the Executive Power.

Congress is divided into a bicameral legislature. Both presidents are elected for a renewable one-year term.

The presidency of the legislative power rotates among the president of each chamber every year, beginning with the president of the Senate.

This is a list of representatives that have served as presidents of the Peruvian legislature.

== Constituent Congress (1822–1825) ==
Name	Took office	Left office
Francisco Xavier de Luna Pizarro	20 Sep 1822	20 Oct 1822
José de Larrea y Loredo	21 Oct 1822	20 Nov 1822
Juan Antonio de Andueza	21 Nov 1822	20 Dec 1822
Hipólito Unanue	20 Dec 1822	20 Feb 1823
Nicolás de Araníbar y Fernández Cornejo	20 Feb 1823	20 Apr 1823
Carlos Pedemonte y Talavera	21 Apr 1823	20 Jun 1823
Justo Figuerola de Estrada	20 Jun 1823	6 Aug 1823
Carlos Pedemonte y Talavera	6 Aug 1823	12 Aug 1823
Justo Figuerola de Estrada	12 Aug 1823	20 Sep 1823
Manuel Arias Pérez de los Ríos	20 Sep 1823	20 Oct 1823
Manuel Salazar y Baquíjano	20 Oct 1823	20 Nov 1823
José de la Mar Cortázar	20 Nov 1823	20 Dec 1823
Felipe Antonio Alvarado Toledo y Pimentel	20 Dec 1823	20 Jan 1824
José María Galdeano y Mendoza	20 Jan 1824	20 Feb 1824
José Gregorio Fernández de Paredes Ayala	20 Feb 1825	10 Mar 1825

== Constituent Congress (1827–1828) ==
Name	Took office	Left office
Francisco Xavier de Luna Pizarro	4 Jun 1827	4 Jul 1827
Manuel Lorenzo de Vidaurre y Encalada	4 Jul 1827	4 Aug 1827
Francisco Valdivieso y Prada	4 Aug 1827	4 Oct 1827
Mariano de la Llosa y Vizcarra	4 Oct 1827	4 Nov 1827
Tomás Diéguez de Florencia	4 Nov 1827	4 Dec 1827
Juan Tomás Moscoso y Pérez	4 Dec 1827	4 Jan 1828
Juan Manuel Nocheto de Castro	4 Jan 1828	4 Feb 1828
Manuel Tellería Vicuña	4 Feb 1828	4 Mar 1828
Francisco Xavier de Luna Pizarro	4 Mar 1828	4 Apr 1828
Mariano Alejo Álvarez Vera	4 Apr 1828	4 Jun 1828
Juan Manuel Nocheto de Castro	4 Jun 1828	16 Jun 1828

== Congress (1829–1832) ==
First bicameral congress of Peru.

Presidents of the Senate
Name	Took office	Left office
Andrés Reyes y Buitrón	31 Aug 1829	20 Dec 1829
Andrés Reyes y Buitrón	19 Apr 1831	26 Sep 1831
Manuel Tellería Vicuña	29 Jul 1832	22 Dec 1832

Presidents of the Chamber of Deputies
Name	Took office	Left office
Juan Antonio Távara Andrade	31 Aug 1829	20 Dec 1829
Juan Bautista Navarrete y Maldonado	19 Apr 1831	26 Sep 1831
José María de Pando y Ramírez de Laredo	29 Jul 1832	22 Dec 1832

== Constituent Congress (1833–1834) ==
Name	Took office	Left office
Francisco de Paula González Vigil Yáñez	12 Sep 1833	12 Oct 1833
José Freyre Rodríguez	12 Oct 1833	12 Nov 1833
Santiago Távara Andrade	12 Nov 1833	12 Dec 1833
Francisco Xavier de Luna Pizarro	12 Dec 1833	12 Mar 1834
Manuel Villarán Loli	12 Mar 1834	12 Apr 1834
Tomás Diéguez de Florencia	12 Apr 1834	12 May 1834
Marcos Farfán	13 May 1834	12 Jun 1834
Rufino Macedo Béjar	12 Jun 1834	12 Jul 1834
Francisco de Paula González Vigil Yáñez	12 Jul 1834	11 Aug 1834

== Legislative Assembly of Peru–Bolivian Confederation ==
President of the Assembly (Republic of South Peru)
Name	Took office	Left office
Nicolás Fernández de Piérola y Flores	7 Dec 1835	22 Mar 1836

President of the Assembly (Republic of North Peru)
Name	Took office	Left office
Evaristo Gómez Sánchez	3 Aug 1836	24 Aug 1836

== Constituent Congress (1839–1840) ==
Name	Took office	Left office
Manuel Bartolomé Ferreyros	15 Aug 1839	15 Sep 1839
Manuel Villarán Loli	15 Sep 1839	15 Oct 1839
Agustín Guillermo Charún	15 Oct 1839	15 Nov 1839
Lucas Pellicer Camacho	15 Nov 1839	28 Nov 1839
Lucas Pellicer Camacho	7 Jul 1840	12 Jul 1840

== Bicameral Congress (1845–1853) ==
=== Presidents of the Senate (1845–1853) ===
Name	Took office	Left office
Manuel Salazar y Baquíjano	16 Apr 1845	28 Jul 1849
Antonio Gutiérrez de la Fuente	28 Jul 1849	28 Dec 1849
Juan Manuel Iturregui Aguilarte	28 Dec 1849	20 Mar 1851
Pedro Cisneros de la Torre	20 Mar 1851	28 Jul 1851
Antonio Gutiérrez de la Fuente	28 Jul 1851	17 Nov 1853

=== Presidents of the Chamber of Deputies (1845–1853) ===
Name	Took office	Left office
Manuel A. Cuadros Loayza	16 Apr 1845	6 Aug 1847
José Isidro Bonifaz	6 Aug 1847	28 Jul 1849
Bartolomé Herrera Vélez	28 Jul 1849	28 Jul 1851
Joaquín José de Osma	28 Jul 1851	28 Jul 1853
Francisco Forcelledo Maldonado	28 Jul 1853	17 Nov 1853

== National Convention (1855–1857) ==
Name	Took office	Left office
Francisco Quirós y Ampudia	14 Jul 1855	5 Sep 1855
José Santos Castañeda (First vice president)	5 Sep 1855	30 Sep 1855
Miguel de San Román y Meza	1 Oct 1855	31 Oct 1855
Manuel Ezequiel Rey de Castro Arce	1 Nov 1855	16 Nov 1855
Manuel Costas Arce (First vice president)	16 Nov 1855	30 Nov 1855
Miguel de San Román y Meza	1 Dec 1855	31 Jan 1856
José Gálvez Egúsquiza	1 Feb 1856	28 Feb 1856
Miguel de San Román y Meza	1 Mar 1856	31 Oct 1856
Manuel Toribio Ureta Pacheco	1 Nov 1856	31 Dec 1856
José Gálvez Egúsquiza	1 Jan 1857	31 Jan 1857
Manuel Toribio Ureta Pacheco	1 Feb 1857	31 Mar 1857
José Gálvez Egúsquiza	1 Apr 1857	31 Aug 1857
Francisco Quirós y Ampudia	1 Sep 1857	31 Oct 1857
Manuel Toribio Ureta Pacheco	1 Nov 1857	2 Nov 1857

== Congress (1858–1859) ==
=== President of the Senate (1858–1859) ===
Name	Took office	Left office
José Miguel Medina Elera	12 Oct 1858	25 May 1859

=== President of the Chamber of Deputies (1858–1859) ===
Name	Took office	Left office
Pedro José Bustamante y Alvizuri	12 Oct 1858	25 May 1859

== Constituent Congress (1860) ==
Name	Took office	Left office
Bartolomé Herrera Vélez	14 Jul 1860	15 Nov 1860

== Bicameral Congress (1860–1865) ==
=== Presidents of the Senate (1860–1865) ===
Name	Took office	Left office
Juan Miguel del Carpio y Melgar	18 Nov 1860	31 May 1863
Ramón Castilla y Marquesado	1864	1864

=== Presidents of the Chamber of Deputies (1860–1865) ===
Name	Took office	Left office
Antonio Arenas Merino	18 Nov 1860	28 Jul 1862
José María Pérez Franco	28 Jul 1862	31 May 1863
José Rufino Echenique Benavente	1864	1864

== Constituent Congress (1867) ==
Name	Took office	Left office
Antonio Salinas y Castañeda	15 Feb 1867	15 Mar 1867
José María Químper Caballero	15 Mar 1867	15 Apr 1867
José Jacinto Ibarra Falcón	15 Apr 1867	15 Jul 1867
Mariano Herencia Zevallos	15 Jul 1867	15 Aug 1867
José Jacinto Ibarra Falcón	15 Aug 1867	15 Sep 1867
Francisco García Calderón Landa	15 Sep 1867	15 Nov 1867

== Bicameral Congress (1868–1879) ==
=== Presidents of the Senate (1868–1879) ===
Name	Took office	Left office
José Rufino Echenique Benavente	28 Jul 1868	28 Jul 1871
No legislature	28 Jul 1871	28 Jul 1872
Manuel Francisco Benavides Canduelas	28 Jul 1872	28 Jul 1873
No legislature	28 Jul 1873	28 Jul 1874
Francisco de Paula Muñoz Sologuren	28 Jul 1874	28 Jul 1876
José Antonio García y García	28 Jul 1876	4 Aug 1876
Francisco Rosas Balcázar	4 Aug 1876	28 Jul 1878
Manuel Pardo y Lavalle	28 Jul 1878	16 Nov 1878
José Antonio García y García; Vice president	16 Nov 1878	28 Jul 1879
José Antonio García y García	28 Jul 1879	25 Oct 1879

=== Presidents of the Chamber of Deputies (1868–1879) ===
Name	Took office	Left office
Juan Oviedo	28 Jul 1868	28 Jul 1870
Manuel Benjamín Cisneros	28 Jul 1870	15 Dec 1870
Eleuterio Macedo (Second vice president)	15 Dec 1870	28 Jul 1871
No legislature	28 Jul 1871	28 Jul 1872
José Simeón Tejeda Mares	28 Jul 1872	28 Jul 1873
No legislature	28 Jul 1873	28 Jul 1874
Mariano Ignacio Prado	28 Jul 1874	28 Aug 1874
Ramón Ribeyro (First vice president)	28 Aug 1874	28 Jul 1875
Mariano Ignacio Prado	28 Jul 1875	28 Jul 1876
Ignacio de Osma y Ramírez de Arellano	28 Jul 1876	28 Jul 1878
Camilo N. Carrillo Martínez	28 Jul 1878	29 Jul 1879
Ricardo Espinoza (First vice president)	29 Jul 1879	25 Oct 1879

== Congress (1881) ==
Installed by the government of Francisco García Calderón in Chorrillos.

=== President of the Senate (1881) ===
Name	Took office	Left office
Francisco de Paula Muñoz Sologuren	10 Jul 1881	23 Aug 1881

=== President of the Chamber of Deputies (1881) ===
Name	Took office	Left office
César Canevaro	10 Jul 1881	23 Aug 1881

== National constituent assembly (1881) ==
Installed by Nicolás de Piérola in Ayacucho.

Name	Took office	Left office
Pío Benigno Meza	28 Jul 1881	12 Sep 1881

== Constituent assembly in the North (1882–1883) ==
Installed by the government of Miguel Iglesias in Cajamarca.

Name	Took office	Left office
Vidal García y García	25 Dec 1882	1883

== Congress (1883) ==
Installed by the government of Lizardo Montero Flores in Arequipa.

=== President of the Senate (1883) ===
Name	Took office	Left office
Manuel Costas Arce	22 Apr 1883	20 Jun 1883

=== President of the Chamber of Deputies (1883) ===
Name	Took office	Left office
Alejandro Arenas Villarreal	22 Apr 1883	20 Jun 1883

== Constituent Congress (1884–1885) ==
Name	Took office	Left office
Antonio Arenas Merino	1 Mar 1884	31 Mar 1884
Antonio Arenas Merino	28 Feb 1885	24 Mar 1885
Manuel Tovar y Chamorro (First vice president)	24 Mar 1885	2 May 1885

== Congress (1886) ==
=== President of Senate (1886) ===
President of Senate
Name	Took office	Left office
Francisco Rosas Balcázar	30 May 1886	13 Jul 1886

=== President of Chamber of Deputies (1886) ===
President of Chamber of Deputies
Name	Took office	Left office
Pedro Alejandrino del Solar Gabans	30 May 1886	6 Jun 1886
Ramón Ribeyro Álvarez del Villar (First vice president)	6 Jun 1886	13 Jul 1886

== Bicameral Congress (1886–1919) ==
=== Presidents of Senate (1886–1919) ===
President of Senate
Name	Took office	Left office	Party
Francisco García Calderón Landa	28 Jul 1886	28 Jul 1887	Civilista Party
Francisco Rosas Balcázar	28 Jul 1887	28 Jul 1888	Civilista Party
Manuel Candamo Iriarte	28 Jul 1888	28 Jul 1889	Civilista Party
Francisco Rosas Balcázar	28 Jul 1889	28 Jul 1890	Civilista Party
Manuel Candamo Iriarte	28 Jul 1890	28 Jul 1891	Civilista Party
Francisco Rosas Balcázar	28 Jul 1891	28 Jul 1892	Civilista Party
Manuel Candamo Iriarte	28 Jul 1892	28 Jul 1893	Civilista Party
Francisco Rosas Balcázar	28 Jul 1893	28 Jul 1894	Civilista Party
César Canevaro	28 Jul 1894	28 Jul 1895	Constitutional Party
Manuel Pablo Olaechea	28 Jul 1895	28 Jul 1896	Democratic Party
Guillermo Billinghurst Angulo	28 Jul 1896	12 Aug 1897	Democratic Party
Manuel Candamo Iriarte	12 Aug 1897	28 Jul 1898	Civilista Party
Rafael Fernández de Villanueva Cortez	28 Jul 1898	28 Jul 1899	Civilista Party
Benjamín Boza Filiberto	28 Jul 1899	28 Jul 1900	Democratic Party
Julio Santiago Normand Soto	28 Jul 1900	28 Jul 1901	
Manuel Candamo Iriarte	28 Jul 1901	28 Jul 1902	Civilista Party
Ántero Aspíllaga Barrera	28 Jul 1902	28 Jul 1904	Civilista Party
Rafael Fernández de Villanueva Cortez	28 Jul 1904	28 Jul 1905	Civilista Party
Manuel Irigoyen Larrea	28 Jul 1905	28 Jul 1906	Constitutional Party
Manuel Camilo Barrios	28 Jul 1906	28 Jul 1908	
Agustín Ganoza y Cavero	28 Jul 1908	28 Jul 1909	
Antero Aspíllaga Barrera	28 Jul 1909	28 Jul 1911	Civilista Party
Agustín Tovar Aguilar	28 Jul 1911	28 Jul 1912	Civilista Party
Rafael Fernández de Villanueva Cortez	28 Jul 1912	28 Jul 1913	Civilista Party
Juan Norberto Eléspuru	28 Jul 1913	28 Jul 1914	
Nicanor Carmona	28 Jul 1914	28 Jul 1915	
Manuel Camilo Barrios	28 Jul 1915	28 Jul 1916	
Amador del Solar Cárdenas	28 Jul 1916	28 Jul 1917	
José Carlos Bernales Rodríguez de Mendoza	28 Jul 1917	28 Jul 1918	
Antonio Miró Quesada de la Guerra	28 Jul 1918	9 Dec 1918	

=== Presidents of Chamber of Deputies (1886–1919) ===
Presidents of Chamber of Deputies
Name	Took office	Left office	Party
Alejandro Arenas Villarreal	28 Jul 1886	28 Jul 1888	Constitutional Party
Manuel María del Valle	28 Jul 1888	28 Jul 1889	Constitutional Party
Mariano Valcárcel	28 Jul 1889	28 Jul 1890	
Manuel María del Valle	28 Jul 1890	28 Jul 1891	Constitutional Party
Mariano Valcárcel	28 Jul 1891	28 Jul 1892	
Alejandro Arenas Villarreal	28 Jul 1892	28 Jul 1893	Constitutional Party
Mariano Valcárcel	28 Jul 1893	28 Jul 1894	
Manuel María del Valle	28 Jul 1894	28 Jul 1895	Constitutional Party
Augusto Durand Maldonado	28 Jul 1895	28 Jul 1896	Democratic Party
Wenceslao Valera Olano	28 Jul 1896	12 Aug 1897	
Carlos de Piérola Villena	12 Aug 1897	28 Jul 1899	Democratic Party
Aurelio Sousa Matute	28 Jul 1899	28 Jul 1900	Democratic Party
Carlos de Piérola Villena	28 Jul 1900	28 Jul 1901	Democratic Party
Mariano H. Cornejo Zenteno	28 Jul 1901	28 Jul 1902	
Carlos de Piérola Villena (resigned)	28 Jul 1902	18 Oct 1902	Democratic Party
Pedro de Osma y Pardo	18 Oct 1902	28 Jul 1903	Democratic Party
Nicanor Álvarez Calderón Roldán	28 Jul 1903	28 Jul 1904	Civilista Party
Cesáreo Chacaltana Reyes	28 Jul 1904	28 Jul 1905	Civilista Party
Antonio Miró Quesada de la Guerra	28 Jul 1905	28 Jul 1906	Civilista Party
Juan Pardo y Barreda (First vice president)	28 Jul 1906	28 Jul 1907	Civilista Party
Juan Pardo y Barreda	28 Jul 1907	28 Jul 1909	Civilista Party
José Matías Manzanilla Barrientos	28 Jul 1909	28 Jul 1910	Civilista Party
Antonio Miró Quesada de la Guerra	28 Jul 1910	28 Jul 1911	Civilista Party
Roberto Leguía Salcedo	28 Jul 1911	28 Jul 1912	Civilista Party
Juan de Dios Salazar y Oyarzábal	28 Jul 1912	28 Jul 1913	Civilista Party
Ricardo Bentín Sánchez	28 Jul 1913	28 Jul 1914	
David García Yrigoyen	28 Jul 1914	28 Jul 1915	
Francisco Tudela y Varela	28 Jul 1915	28 Jul 1916	Civilista Party
José Matías Manzanilla Barrientos	28 Jul 1916	28 Jul 1917	Civilista Party
Juan Pardo y Barreda	28 Jul 1917	9 Dec 1918	Civilista Party

== National constituent assembly (1919) ==
President of the national constituent assembly
Name	Took office	Left office
Mariano H. Cornejo Zenteno	24 Sep 1919	27 Dec 1919

== Presidents of the Senate (1919–1930) ==
Presidents of the Senate
Name	Took office	Left office	Party
Mariano H. Cornejo Zenteno	28 Dec 1919	28 Jul 1920	Reformist Democratic Party
Augusto Bedoya Suárez	28 Jul 1920	28 Jul 1921	Constitutional Party
César Canevaro	28 Jul 1921	28 Jul 1922	Constitutional Party
Germán Luna Iglesias	28 Jul 1922	28 Jul 1923	Reformist Democratic Party
Manuel Guillermo Rey Torres Valdivia	28 Jul 1923	4 May 1925	Reformist Democratic Party
Antonio Castro y Arellano	4 May 1925	18 Jun 1925	Reformist Democratic Party
Enrique de la Piedra (First vice president)	18 Jun 1925	28 Jul 1925	
Enrique de la Piedra	28 Jul 1925	28 Jul 1927	
Roberto Leguía Salcedo	28 Jul 1927	22 Aug 1930	Reformist Democratic Party

== Presidents of the Chamber of Deputies (1919–1930) ==
Presidents of the Chamber of Deputies
Name	Took office	Left office	Party
Juan de Dios Salazar y Oyarzábal	28 Dec 1919	28 Jul 1921	Reformist Democratic Party
Pedro José Rada y Gamio	28 Jul 1921	28 Jul 1922	Reformist Democratic Party
Jesús M. Salazar del Valle	28 Jul 1922	28 Jul 1923	Reformist Democratic Party
Foción A. Mariátegui Ausejo	28 Jul 1923	28 Jul 1926	Reformist Democratic Party
Jesús M. Salazar del Valle	28 Jul 1926	27 Jul 1928	Reformist Democratic Party
Celestino Manchego Muñoz (First vice president)	27 Jul 1928	12 Jan 1929	Reformist Democratic Party
Foción A. Mariátegui Ausejo	12 Jan 1929	22 Aug 1930	Reformist Democratic Party

== Constituent Congress (1931–1936) ==
Presidents of the Constituent Congress
Name	Took office	Left office	Political party
Luis Antonio Eguiguren Escudero	8 Dec 1931	21 Apr 1932	Party Socialdemócrata
Clemente Justiniano Revilla Villanueva	21 Apr 1932	8 Dec 1936	Nationalist Party

== Bicameral Congress (1939–1968) ==
=== Presidents of the Senate (1939–1968) ===
Presidents of the Senate
Name	Took office	Left office	Political party
Ernesto Montagne Markholz	8 Dec 1939	28 Jul 1941	
Ignacio A. Brandariz	28 Jul 1941	28 Jul 1943	
Ernesto Diez Canseco Masías	28 Jul 1943	28 Jul 1945	
José Gálvez Barrenechea	28 Jul 1945	28 Jul 1948	National Democratic Front
No legislature	28 Jul 1948	29 Oct 1948	
Vacant, coup d'état	29 Oct 1948	28 Jul 1950	
Héctor Boza Aizcorbe	28 Jul 1950	28 Jul 1952	Party Restaurador
July de la Piedra del Castillo	28 Jul 1952	28 Jul 1954	Party Restaurador
Héctor Boza Aizcorbe	28 Jul 1954	28 Jul 1956	Party Restaurador
José Gálvez Barrenechea	28 Jul 1956	8 Feb 1957	
Raúl Porras Barrenechea (First vice president)	8 Feb 1957	28 Jul 1957	
Enrique Torres Belón	28 Jul 1957	28 Jul 1958	
Rodrigo Franco Guerra	28 Jul 1958	28 Jul 1959	Peruvian Aprista Party
Enrique Martinelli Tizón	28 Jul 1959	28 Jul 1960	
Alberto Arca Parró	28 Jul 1960	28 Jul 1961	
Enrique Martinelli Tizón	28 Jul 1961	18 Jul 1962	
Vacant, coup d'état	18 Jul 1962	28 Jul 1963	
July de la Piedra del Castillo	28 Jul 1963	28 Jul 1964	Unión Nacional Odriísta
Ramiro Prialé Prialé	28 Jul 1964	28 Jul 1965	Peruvian Aprista Party
David Aguilar Cornejo	28 Jul 1965	28 Jul 1966	Unión Nacional Odriísta
Luis Alberto Sánchez Sánchez	28 Jul 1966	30 Aug 1967	Peruvian Aprista Party
Julio de la Piedra del Castillo	30 Aug 1967	30 Aug 1967	
David Aguilar Cornejo	30 Aug 1967	28 Jul 1968	Unión Nacional Odriísta
Carlos Manuel Cox Roose	28 Jul 1968	3 Oct 1968	Peruvian Aprista Party

=== Presidents of the Chamber of Deputies (1939–1968) ===
Presidents of the Chamber of Deputies
Name	Took office	Left office	Political party
Carlos Sayán Álvarez	8 Dec 1939	28 Jul 1941	Revolutionary Union
Gerardo Balbuena Carrillo	28 Jul 1941	28 Jul 1944	
Carlos Sayán Álvarez	28 Jul 1944	28 Jul 1945	Revolutionary Union
Fernando León de Vivero	28 Jul 1945	28 Jul 1946	Peruvian Aprista Party
Pedro E. Muñiz Martínez	28 Jul 1946	28 Jul 1947	Peruvian Aprista Party
Fernando León de Vivero	28 Jul 1947	28 Jul 1948	Peruvian Aprista Party
No legislature	28 Jul 1948	29 Oct 1948	
Vacant, coup d'état	29 Oct 1948	28 Jul 1950	
Claudio Fernández Concha	28 Jul 1950	28 Jul 1952	
Juan Manuel Peña Prado	28 Jul 1952	28 Jul 1954	
Eduardo Miranda Sousa	28 Jul 1954	28 Jul 1956	
Carlos Ledgard Jiménez	28 Jul 1956	28 Jul 1958	
Javier Ortiz de Zevallos Thorndike	28 Jul 1958	28 Jul 1960	Pradist Democratic Movement
Armando de la Flor Valle	28 Jul 1960	18 Jul 1962	
Vacant, coup d'état	18 Jul 1962	28 Jul 1963	
Fernando León de Vivero	28 Jul 1963	28 Jul 1964	Peruvian Aprista Party
Víctor Freundt Rosell	28 Jul 1964	28 Jul 1965	
Enrique Rivero Vélez	28 Jul 1965	28 Jul 1966	Unión Nacional Odriísta
Antonio Monsalve Morante	28 Jul 1966	28 Jul 1967	
Armando Villanueva del Campo	28 Jul 1967	28 Jul 1968	Peruvian Aprista Party
Andrés Townsend Ezcurra	28 Jul 1968	3 Oct 1968	Peruvian Aprista Party

== Constituent assembly (1978–1979) ==
President of the Constituent assembly
Name	Took office	Left office	Political party
Víctor Raúl Haya de la Torre	28 Jul 1978	13 Mar 1979	Peruvian Aprista Party
Luis Alberto Sánchez	13 Mar 1979	13 Jul 1979	Peruvian Aprista Party

== Bicameral Congress (1980–1992) ==
=== Presidents of the Senate (1980–1992) ===
Presidents of the Senate of the Republic
Name	Took office	Left office	Political party
July Óscar Trelles Montes	26 Jul 1980	26 Jul 1981	Popular Action
Javier Alva Orlandini	26 Jul 1981	26 Jul 1982	Popular Action
Sandro Mariátegui Chiappe	26 Jul 1982	26 Jul 1983	Popular Action
Ricardo Monteagudo Monteagudo	26 Jul 1983	26 Jul 1984	Popular Action
Manuel Ulloa Elías	26 Jul 1984	26 Jul 1985	Popular Action
Luis Alberto Sánchez	26 Jul 1985	26 Jul 1986	Peruvian Aprista Party
Armando Villanueva del Campo	26 Jul 1986	26 Jul 1987	Peruvian Aprista Party
Ramiro Prialé Prialé (Note: Ramiro Prialé died on 25 February 1988.)	26 Jul 1987	25 Feb 1988	Peruvian Aprista Party
Jorge Lozada Stanbury (Note: Jorge Lozada assumed the Presidency of the Senate after the death of Ramiro Prialé, because he was the Vice-President of the Chamber.)	25 Feb 1988	26 Jul 1988	Peruvian Aprista Party
Romualdo Biaggi Rodríguez	26 Jul 1988	26 Jul 1989	Peruvian Aprista Party
Humberto Carranza Piedra	26 Jul 1989	26 Jul 1990	Peruvian Aprista Party
Máximo San Román Cáceres	26 Jul 1990	26 Jul 1991	Cambio 90
Felipe Osterling Parodi (Note: Felipe Osterling's presidency was interrupted when President Fujimori dissolved Congress in 1992.)	26 Jul 1991	5 Apr 1992	Christian People's Party

=== Presidents of the Chamber of Deputies (1980–1992) ===
Presidents of the Chamber of Deputies of the Republic
Name	Took office	Left office	Political party
Francisco Belaúnde Terry	26 Jul 1980	26 Jul 1981	Popular Action
Luis Pércovich Roca	26 Jul 1981	26 Jul 1982	Popular Action
Valentín Paniagua	26 Jul 1982	26 Jul 1983	Popular Action
Dagoberto Láinez Vodanovic	26 Jul 1983	26 Jul 1984	Popular Action
Elías Mendoza Habersperger	26 Jul 1984	26 Jul 1985	Popular Action
Luis Alberto Negreiros Criado	26 Jul 1985	26 Jul 1986	Peruvian Aprista Party
Fernando León de Vivero	26 Jul 1986	26 Jul 1987	Peruvian Aprista Party
Luis Alva Castro	26 Jul 1987	26 Jul 1988	Peruvian Aprista Party
Héctor Vargas Haya	26 Jul 1988	26 Jul 1989	Peruvian Aprista Party
Fernando León de Vivero (Note: Fernando León de Vivero died on 26 January 1990.)	26 Jul 1989	26 Jan 1990	Peruvian Aprista Party
Luis Alvarado Contreras (Note: Luis Alvarado assumed the Presidency of the Chamber after the death of Fernando León De Vivero, because he was the 1st Vice-President of the Chamber.)	26 Jan 1990	26 Jul 1990	Peruvian Aprista Party
Víctor Felipe Paredes Guerra	26 Jul 1990	26 Jul 1991	Cambio 90
Roberto Ramírez del Villar Beaumont (Note: Roberto Ramírez del Villar's presidency was interrupted when President Fujimori dissolved Congress in 1992.)	26 Jul 1991	5 Apr 1992	Christian People's Party

== Democratic Constituent Congress (1992–1995) ==
President of the Constituent Congress
Name	Took office	Left office	Political party
Jaime Yoshiyama	20 Dec 1992	24 Jul 1995	Cambio 90 – New Majority

== Congress of the Republic (1995–2026) ==
Presidents of the Congress of the Republic
President		Took office	Left office	Party
Portrait	Name	Took office	Left office	Party
	Martha Chávez	26 Jul 1995	26 Jul 1996	Cambio 90 – New Majority (New Majority)
	Víctor Joy Way	26 Jul 1996	26 Jul 1997	Cambio 90 – New Majority (New Majority)
	Carlos Torres y Torres Lara	26 Jul 1997	26 Jul 1998	Cambio 90 – New Majority (New Majority)
	Víctor Joy Way	26 Jul 1998	3 Jan 1999	Cambio 90 – New Majority (New Majority)
	Ricardo Marcenaro (Interim as First Vice President)	3 Jan 1999	26 Jul 1999	Cambio 90 – New Majority (New Majority)
	Martha Hildebrandt	26 Jul 1999	13 Nov 2000	Cambio 90 – New Majority (Change 90)
	Martha Hildebrandt	26 Jul 1999	13 Nov 2000	Peru 2000 (Change 90)
	Luz Salgado (Interim as First Vice President) (Note: Luz Salgado temporarily assumed the position of President of Congress after a motion to censure President Hildebrandt.)	13 Nov 2000	16 Nov 2000	Peru 2000 (Change 90)
	Valentín Paniagua (Note: Valentìn Paniagua was elected President of Congress and as such simultaneously served as President of the Transitional Government.) (on leave: 22 Nov 2000 – 26 Jul 2001) (Note: His role as President of Congress was immediately suspended following his ascension to the Presidency of Peru.)	16 Nov 2000	26 Jul 2001	Popular Action
	Luz Salgado (Interim as First Vice President) (Note: Acted as President of Congress following Valentín Paniagua's election as President of Peru.)	22 Nov 2000	30 Nov 2000	Peru 2000 (Change 90)
	Francisco Tudela (Interim as Second Vice President)	30 Nov 2000	5 Dec 2000	Peru 2000 (Independent)
	Carlos Ferrero Costa (Interim as First Vice President: 5 Dec 2000 – 26 Jul 2001) (Note: Carlos Ferrero Costa was assigned to President of Congress by an agreement between different political parties.)	5 Dec 2000	26 Jul 2001	Possible Peru
	Carlos Ferrero Costa (Interim as First Vice President: 5 Dec 2000 – 26 Jul 2001)	27 Jul 2001	26 Jul 2003	Possible Peru
	Henry Pease	27 Jul 2003	26 Jul 2004	Possible Peru (Independent)
	Antero Flores Aráoz	27 Jul 2004	26 Jul 2005	National Unity (Christian People's Party)
	Marcial Ayaipoma	27 Jul 2005	26 Jul 2006	Possible Peru
	Mercedes Cabanillas	27 Jul 2006	26 Jul 2007	Peruvian Aprista Party
	Luis Gonzales Posada	27 Jul 2007	26 Jul 2008	Peruvian Aprista Party
	Javier Velásquez	27 Jul 2008	11 Jul 2009	Peruvian Aprista Party
	Alejandro Aguinaga (Interim as First Vice President) (Note: Alejandro Aguinaga temporarily assumed the position of President of Congress after Javier Velásquez's nomination as President of the Council of Ministers.)	11 Jul 2009	26 Jul 2009	Fujimorist Parliamentary Group (Force 2011)
	Luis Alva Castro	27 Jul 2009	26 Jul 2010	Peruvian Aprista Party
	Cesar Zumaeta	27 Jul 2010	25 Jul 2011	Peruvian Aprista Party
	Daniel Abugattás	25 Jul 2011	26 Jul 2012	Peruvian Nationalist Party
	Víctor Isla	26 Jul 2012	26 Jul 2013	Peruvian Nationalist Party
	Fredy Otárola	26 Jul 2013	22 Jul 2014	Peruvian Nationalist Party
	Luis Iberico Núñez (Interim as Second Vice President) (Note: Luis Iberico temporarily assumed the position of President of Congress after Freddy Otárola's nomination as Minister of Labor.)	22 Jul 2014	26 Jul 2014	Alliance for Progress
	Ana María Solórzano	26 Jul 2014	26 Jul 2015	Peruvian Nationalist Party
	Luis Iberico Núñez	26 Jul 2015	26 Jul 2016	Alliance for Progress
	Luz Salgado	26 Jul 2016	26 Jul 2017	Popular Force
	Luis Galarreta	26 Jul 2017	26 Jul 2018	Popular Force
	Daniel Salaverry	26 Jul 2018	27 Jul 2019	Popular Force
	Pedro Olaechea	27 Jul 2019	16 Mar 2020	Republican Action (Independent)
	Manuel Merino (on leave: 10 – 15 Nov 2020)	16 Mar 2020	15 Nov 2020	Popular Action
	Luis Valdez Farías (Interim as First Vice President)	10 Nov 2020	15 Nov 2020	Alliance for Progress
	Rocío Silva-Santisteban (Acting)	15 Nov 2020	16 Nov 2020	Broad Front (Independent)
	Francisco Sagasti (on leave: 17 Nov 2020 – 26 Jul 2021)	16 Nov 2020	26 Jul 2021	Purple Party
	Mirtha Vásquez (Interim as First Vice President) (Note: Vásquez acted as President of Congress following Francisco Sagasti's election as President of Peru.)	17 Nov 2020	26 Jul 2021	Broad Front (Independent)
	María del Carmen Alva	26 Jul 2021	26 Jul 2022	Popular Action
	Lady Camones	26 Jul 2022	5 Sep 2022 (removed)	Alliance for Progress
	Martha Moyano (Interim as First Vice President)	5 Sep 2022	12 Sep 2022	Popular Force
	José Williams	12 Sep 2022	26 Jul 2023	Go on Country – Social Integration Party
	Alejandro Soto Reyes	26 Jul 2023	26 Jul 2024	Alliance for Progress
	Eduardo Salhuana	26 Jul 2024	26 Jul 2025	Alliance for Progress
	José Jerí (on leave: 10 Oct 2025 – 17 Feb 2026)	26 Jul 2025	17 Feb 2026	We Are Peru
	Fernando Rospigliosi (Interim as First Vice President) (Note: Rospigliosi acted as President of Congress following José Jerí's election as President of Peru. He continued serving in an acting capacity following the election of José María Balcázar.)	10 Oct 2025	26 Jul 2026	Popular Force
	José María Balcázar (on leave)	18 Feb 2026	26 Jul 2026	Independent

== Bicameral Congress (2026–present) ==
=== President of the Senate ===
Presidents of the Senate
President		Took office	Left office	Political party
Portrait	Name	Took office	Left office	Political party
	Miki Torres	26 July 2026	Incumbent	Popular Force

=== President of the Chamber of Deputies ===
Presidents of the Chamber of Deputies
Name	Took office	Left office	Political party
Óscar Reto Otero	26 July 2026	Incumbent	Party of Good Government
