= Guillermo Billinghurst =

President of Peru from 1912 to 1914

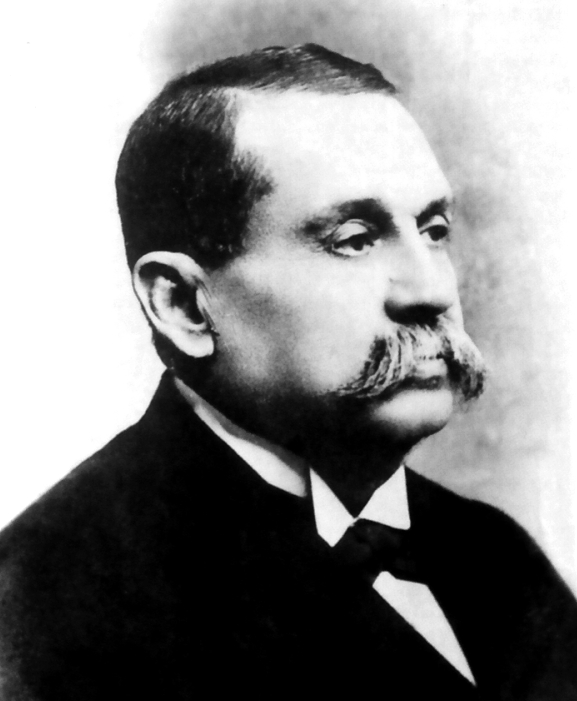

President of Peru
- In office 24 September 1912 – 4 February 1914
- Prime Minister: Elías Malpartida; Enrique Varela Vidaurre; Federico Luna y Peralta; Aurelio Sousa Matute
- Vice President: Roberto Leguía; Miguel Echenique
- Preceded by: Augusto B. Leguía
- Succeeded by: Óscar R. Benavides

President of the Senate
- In office 28 July 1896 – 28 July 1897
- Preceded by: Manuel Pablo Olaechea
- Succeeded by: Manuel Candamo

First Vice President of Peru
- In office 8 September 1895 – 8 September 1899
- President: Nicolás de Piérola
- Preceded by: Vacant (Last held by César Canevaro in 1895)
- Succeeded by: Isaac Alzamora

Senator from Tacna
- In office 28 July 1895 – 28 July 1899
- Preceded by: Manuel Pablo Olaechea
- Succeeded by: Manuel Candamo

Member of the Chamber of Deputies
- In office 28 July 1878 – 28 July 1880
- Constituency: Tarapacá Province

Personal details
- Born: Guillermo Enrique Billinghurst Angulo; 27 July 1851 Arica, Peru
- Died: 28 June 1915 (aged 63) Iquique, Chile
- Party: Democratic Party of Peru
- Relatives: Susana Ferrari Billinghurst (cousin)
- Profession: Entrepreneur

Guillermo Enrique Billinghurst Angulo (27 July 1851 – 28 June 1915) was a Peruvian politician who served as the 37th president of Peru from 1912 until his overthrow in 1914.

An Anglo-Peruvian, Billinghurst was one of the leaders of the Democratic Party (El Partido Demócrata), whose members primarily representatives of the national bourgeoisie and middle-class in the south of the country, and oriented toward the domestic market. They were opposed by the Civilistas, whose interests were directly or indirectly linked to foreign capital and were typically oriented to the foreign (export) of raw-material commodities. During his presidency, Billinghurst became embroiled in an increasingly bitter series of conflicts with Congress.

A liberal, he proposed and attempted to pass advanced social legislation in favour of the working classes. This was blocked by the conservative and oligarchic factions in the Peruvian Congress. To get around them, Billinghurst attempted to call fresh elections, which prompted these same Conservative factions to call upon the Peruvian military, led by Óscar R. Benavides, to carry out a coup d'état. As a result of the coup, which resulted in Benavides becoming president, Billinghurst was sent into exile in Chile where he died shortly thereafter.

Despite his problems with Congress and his eventual downfall, Billinghurst nevertheless succeeded in launching a program aimed at building working-class housing and establishing a School of Domestic Education to provide work for poor women. In addition, a decree was introduced during his presidency that provided an eight-hour day for port workers, while a Supreme Decree of July 1913 contained detailed measures intended to provide industrial safety in various establishments.

== Early life ==
Billinghurst was born into a wealthy family of English origin, and raised in comfortable circumstances. Billinghurst's surname is a locational name; Billingshurst is a small town and civil parish in Sussex. He was part of the Civilista group, the political group whose members were considered the architects of unprecedented political stability and economic growth in the country, but who also set in motion profound social changes that would, in time, alter the political panorama of Peru.

During his presidency, Billinghurst became embroiled in an increasingly bitter series of conflicts with Congress, ranging from proposed advanced social legislation to the settlement of the Tacna-Arica dispute. This provoked a military uprising organised by civilian opponents to his regime, who used the military to carry out a coup. As a result of the uprising, Billinghurst was sent into exile in Chile, where he died shortly thereafter.

As First Vice President of Peru under the Piérola Administration (1895–1899), Billinghurst was involved in several attempts to solve the Tacna and Arica territorial dispute with Chile. On 9 April 1898, a memorandum was subscribed between the Chilean Minister of Foreign Affairs Raimundo Silva Cruz and Billinghurst. It established that before a plebiscite could be held between both countries, an arbitrage would first be requested to the Queen of Spain, María Cristina de Habsburgo-Lorena (1858–1929) to determine the conditions of the vote. Subsequent events led the Protocol of Billinghurst-Latorre not being ratified by the Chilean Chamber of Deputies. A direct result of this setback was the breakdown of diplomatic relations between Peru and Chile in 1901.

Billinghurst served as president of the Senate from 1896 to 1897.

== 1912 elections ==
The elections of 1912 were the most passionate ones of the so-called Aristocratic Republic (a term coined by Peruvians referring to those in power that were mostly from the social elite of the country). The Civilista Party rallied behind the candidacy of Antero Aspíllaga, one of the most prominent and conservative members of the Party. His opponents accused him of being a Chilean-born Peruvian unfit for office.

The Civilistas, however, were unable to manage the new social forces that their policies unleashed. This first became apparent in 1912 when the millionaire businessman Guillermo Billinghurst-–the reform-minded, populist former mayor of Lima-–was able to organize a general strike to block the election of the official Civilista presidential candidate and force his own election by Congress.

== Presidency ==
One of the main accomplishments of the Billinghurst administration was the establishment of important legislation that guaranteed the eight-hour day in Peru. When Congress opened impeachment hearings against Billinghurst in 1914, he threatened to arm the workers and forcibly dissolve Congress.

Billinghurst was overthrown on 4 February 1914, in a military coup headed by colonel Oscar R. Benavides, Jorge Prado, Manuel Prado, and conservative members of the Civilista Party. Benavides became president.

Later in exile, Billinghurst declared: "The young Prado, in an extense and pathetic speech, gave me the details and motives behind the coup: All of them (the mutineerered) recognised my patriotism, integrity and my capability to handle the government. However, the only and most serious mistake that I made was the course that my internal politics was doing to the country and, finally, I think the sons of former president Prado must «clean his fathers memory»."

== See also ==
- List of presidents of Peru
- Politics of Peru

Political offices
Preceded by César Canevaro	First Vice President of Peru; 1895–1899	Succeeded by Isaac Alzamora
Preceded by Federico Elguera	Mayor of Lima; 1909–1912	Succeeded by Nicanor Carmona
Preceded by Augusto B. Leguía	President of Peru; 1912–1914	Succeeded by Oscar R. Benavides
