= 1919 Peruvian presidential election =

- 18 May 1919
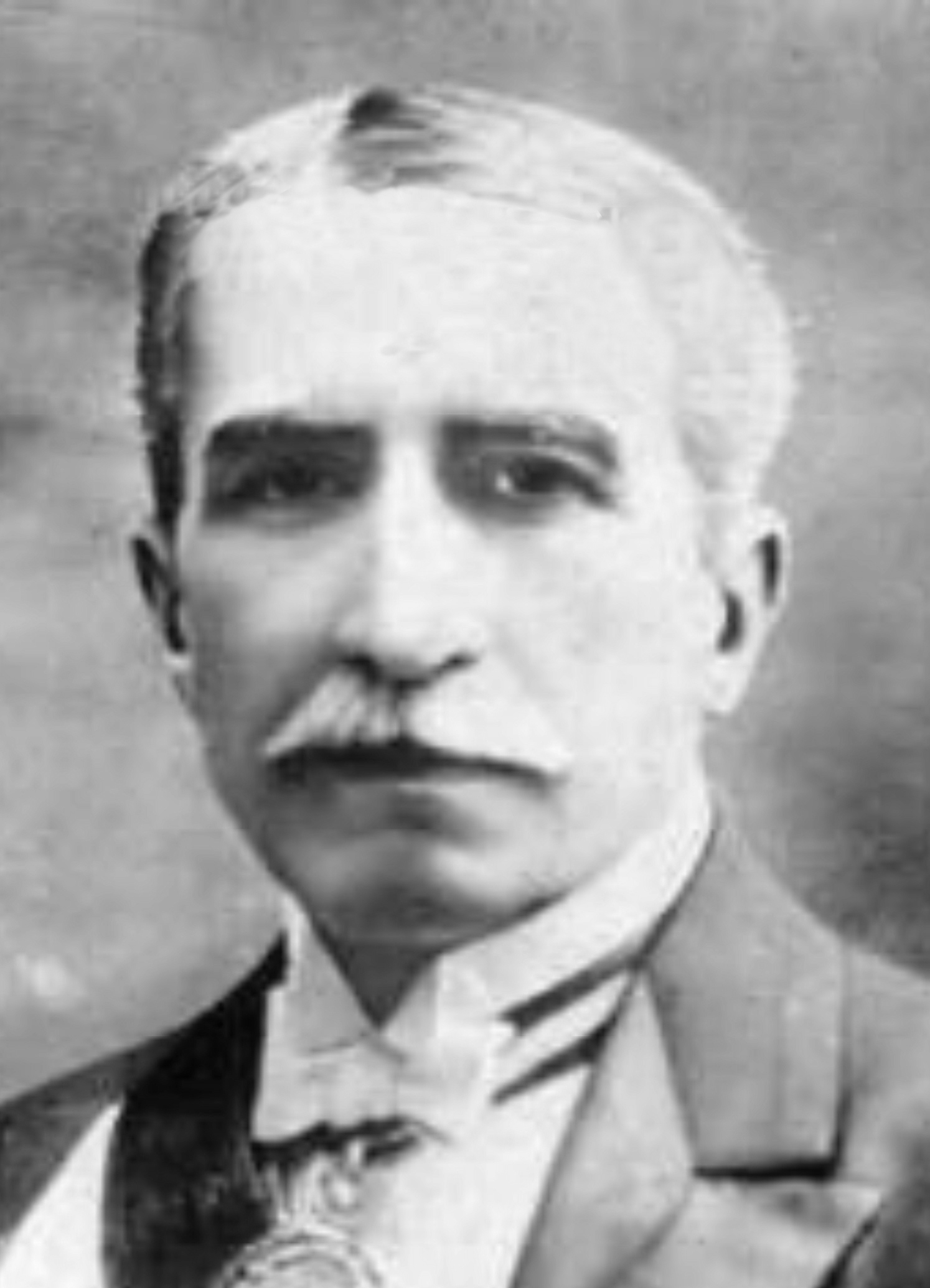

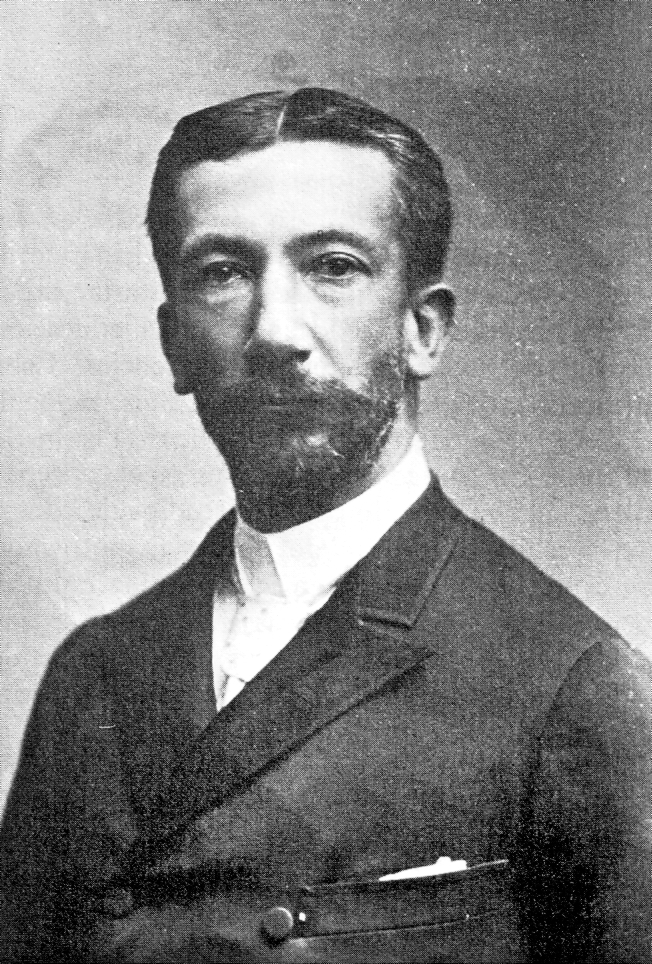
Candidate	Augusto B. Leguía	Ántero Aspíllaga Barrera
Party	Independent Party	Civilista Party
Popular vote	122,736	64,936
Percentage	62.34%	32.98%
President before election
José Pardo y Barreda
Elected President
Augusto B. Leguía

Presidential elections were held in Peru on 18 May 1919. Augusto B. Leguía was elected with 62% of the vote.

== Results ==
Candidate	Party	Votes	%
Augusto B. Leguía	Independent Party	122,736	62.34
Ántero Aspíllaga Barrera	Civilista Party	64,936	32.98
José Carlos Bernales		6,038	3.07
Isaías de Piérola	Democratic Party	3,167	1.61
Total		196,877	100.00
Source: Tuesta, Marett, Arroyo
