= Antonio Miró Quesada de la Guerra =

Peruvian politician and director of El Comercio

Antonio Miró Quesada
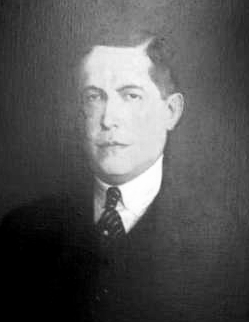

President of the Chamber of Deputies
- In office 1906–1906
- Preceded by: Cesáreo Chacaltana Reyes
- Succeeded by: Juan Pardo y Barreda
- In office 1910–1910
- Preceded by: José Matías Manzanilla
- Succeeded by: Roberto Leguía

President of the Senate
- In office 1918–1918
- Preceded by: José Carlos Bernales
- Succeeded by: Mariano H. Cornejo

Ambassador of Peru to Belgium
- In office 1933–1934

Personal details
- Born: April 7, 1875 Callao, Peru
- Died: May 15, 1935 (aged 60) Lima, Peru
- Cause of death: Assassination
- Resting place: Presbítero Maestro
- Party: Civilista Party
- Spouse: María Laos Argüelles
- Children: 11, including Carlos
- Relatives: Miró Quesada family
- Education: University of San Marcos
- Affiliations: National Club

Antonio Tomás Miró Quesada de la Guerra (Callao; April 7, 1875 — Lima; May 15, 1935) was a Peruvian journalist, lawyer, diplomat and politician. He was director of the newspaper El Comercio from 1905 until his assassination in 1935, having written articles in his final years under the pseudonym of El Mismo.

== Biography ==
He was the son of José Antonio Miró Quesada (Panama; January 19, 1845 — Lima; October 30, 1930) and Matilde de la Guerra Gorostide (1853 — May 5, 1925). His father was the owner of the newspaper El Comercio. Much of his school studies were carried out in England, because his parents were outside Peru for political reasons; Back in Lima, he continued them under the direction of Professor Agustín Whilar. He entered the University of San Marcos, where he obtained the following degrees: Bachelor of Arts (1896), Doctor of Letters (1896), Bachelor of Jurisprudence (1897), Lawyer (1898) and Doctor of Political and Administrative Sciences. (1901).

He married María Laos Argüelles, with whom he had eleven children: José Antonio, Manuel, Carlos, Joaquín, Raúl, Enrique, Hernán, María, Delfina, Amalia and Alfredo Miró Quesada Laos.

From a young age he dedicated himself to journalism and was entrusted with directing the newspaper El Comercio starting in 1905. He was a professor at the University of San Marcos, where he was in charge of the chair of Sociology and Administrative Law.

=== Political career ===
He began in public activity as councilor of the Municipality of Lima.

In 1901 he ran for the Chamber of Deputies, as part of the Civilista Party and was elected deputy for El Callao, being re-elected in 1907. As a deputy he was part of the Diplomatic Commission, the Main Finance Commission and the Constitution Commission (as president). During his administration he was elected President of the Chamber of Deputies, reaching a total of 69 votes out of 98 representatives in 1907 and 1910, with 69 votes out of a total of 78 representatives. He was in office until 1911, when he began the first government of Augusto Leguía.

In 1913 Miró Quesada was elected Senator for El Callao, as such he joined the Government, Constitution, Justice and Legislation Commissions, all of which he presided over the course of the legislative period, as well as the Diplomatic Commission. In 1918 he was elected President of the National Senate.

He was elected senator again in the 1919 elections: however, at dawn on July 4, the acting congress (of which Miró Quesada was president) was dissolved, and the elected man was not installed due to Augusto's coup d'état. Leguía. In September of the same year, Antonio Miró Quesada went to live with his family in the United States due to the regime's actions against the newspapers El Comercio and La Prensa: both newspapers were burnt down by a crowd headed by Leguía, as was Miró Quesada's personal residence. He remained between the U.S. and Europe until 1925. Upon his return, he refrained from participating in political activities. He was Plenipotentiary Minister of Peru in Belgium from 1933 to 1934.

== Death ==
On May 15, 1935, Miró Quesada and his wife, María Laos Argüelles de Miró Quesada, were gunned down in the Plaza San Martín by 19-year-old Carlos Steer Lafont, leader of the Aprista Youth Federation. Miró Quesada left the El Comercio premises and went to the Gran Hotel Bolívar, where they were staying, to pick up his wife. They were both walking to lunch at the National Club, when, at 1:45 pm, while they were in front of the Teatro Colón, Miró Quesada was shot three times, one in the middle of the back, the others in the back of the head and at the base of the skull. His wife tried to defend him and she confronted Steer with her purse, who shot her. The couple died instantly and Steer fled towards Jirón Quilca, shooting himself non-fatally three times when surrounded and being sentenced to 25 years in prison.

== See also ==
- El Comercio (Peru)
