= Miguel Echenique =

Peruvian politician

Miguel Echenique (born Lima, 1863 - Lima, [death year missing]) was a Peruvian politician and agricultural businessman. He was Second Vice President of Peru during the government of Guillermo Billinghurst (1912-1914).

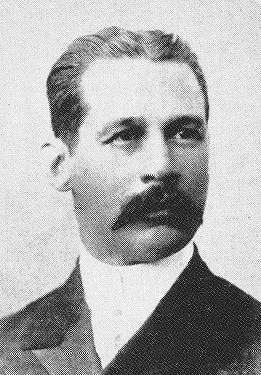
Miguel Echenique

== Biography ==
He was born to José Bonifacio Echenique and Estefanía Fonseca. He completed his secondary education from the Colegio Nacional Nuestra Señora of Guadalupe (1874-1880). After finishing his studies in the school, he joined the Pacific War, he enlisted as a soldier in the reserve, during the resistance of Lima. The resistance was facing increasing difficulties, as the Chilean Army advanced and invaded the army. After the resistance suffered defeat in Miraflores, he was relieved of his military service.

After the war, he devoted himself to agricultural activities. He worked as the administrator of various farms in the Rímac Valley. He owned some of the farms in that area, which ultimately were hugely profitable for him. He also focused on industrial activities. He served as the manager of "Compañía Azucarera Chacra Grande", where he started manufacturing cement. His involvement in the financial matters of Peru rapidly increased. For several years, he topped the list of the country's largest taxpayers. In 1913, he chaired the National Assembly of Taxpayers, which at that time played an important role in guiding the economic policy of the country.

He joined the Civilista Party, a party controlled by the oligarchy. He was a member of the board of directors of that party. Between 1907 and 1912, he served as the Senator from Lima.

In 1912, Congress elected Guillermo Billinghurst as President of the Republic. Along with Billinghurst, it also elected the vice presidents. Roberto Leguía and Miguel Echenique were chosen as First and Second vice-president, respectively. However, both failed to swear in.

A coup d'état took place in Peru on February 4, 1914, Echenique resigned and declared himself a supporter of the solution of political problems of the country by elections.

In 1915, he was elected senator from Lima. During his senatorial career, he was vested with the duty of overseeing the treasury (in 1916 and 1918).

After the coup d'etat of July 4, 1919, he was arrested, as the regime of Augusto Leguía accused him of being a conspirator. After his release, Echenique retired from politics and devoted himself to business.

== Bibliography ==
- Basadre Grohmann, Jorge:Historia de la República del Perú (1822 - 1933), Volume 13. Edited by the Empresa Editora El Comercio S. A. Lima, 2005. ISBN 9972-205-75-4 (V.13)
- Tauro del Pino, Alberto: Enciclopedia Ilustrada del Perú. Third Edition. Volume 6, D’AC/FER. Lima, PEISA, 2001. ISBN 9972-40-155-3.
