= Leguía =

Leguía is a surname. Notable people with the surname include:

- Augusto B. Leguía (1863–1932), Peruvian politician
- Germán Leguía (born 1954), Peruvian footballer
- Luis Leguía (1935–2024), American cellist and luthier
- Roberto Leguía (1866-1930), Peruvian politician
