= List of ambassadors of Peru to Chile =

Ambassador of Peru to the Republic of Chile
- Great Seal of Peru
- Ministry of Foreign Affairs
- Appointer: The president of Peru
- Inaugural holder: José Cabero y Salazar
- Formation: 1822
- Website: Embassy of Peru in Chile

The extraordinary and plenipotentiary ambassador of Peru to the Republic of Chile is the official representative of the Republic of Peru to the Republic of Chile.

Both countries established relations in 1822 and maintained them in an amicable manner until the War of the Pacific in 1879, which has left a feeling of Anti-Chilean sentiment in Peru since. This situation improved somewhat however after the signing of the 1929 Treaty of Lima, although a minor territorial dispute between both states remains to this day.

== List of representatives ==
| Name | Portrait | Term begin | Term end | President | Notes |
|---|---|---|---|---|---|
| José Cabero y Salazar | | 1822 | | José de San Martín | Minister plenipotentiary |
| Juan García del Río | | 1822 | | José de San Martín | Minister plenipotentiary |
| James Paroissien | | 1822 | | José de San Martín | Minister plenipotentiary |
| José Miguel Berazan | | 1823 | | José Bernardo de Tagle | Minister plenipotentiary |
| Juan Manuel Iturregui Aguilarte | | 1823 | | José Bernardo de Tagle | Minister plenipotentiary |
| José de Larrea y Loredo | | 1823 | | José Bernardo de Tagle | Minister plenipotentiary |
| Juan de Salazar y Carrillo de Córdoba | | 1823 | | José Bernardo de Tagle | Minister plenipotentiary |
| Mariano Alejo Álvarez | | 1826 | | Simón Bolívar | Minister plenipotentiary |
| Andrés de Santa Cruz | | 1828 | | Andrés de Santa Cruz | Minister plenipotentiary |
| Isidoro Aramburu | | 1833 | | Francisco Xavier de Luna Pizarro | Minister plenipotentiary |
| Santiago Tabará | | 1834 | | Pedro Pablo Bermúdez | Minister plenipotentiary |
| Felipe Pardo y Aliaga | | 1835 | | Felipe Santiago Salaverry | Minister plenipotentiary |
| José de la Riva Agüero | | 1835 | | Felipe Santiago Salaverry | Minister plenipotentiary |
| Casimiro Olañeta | | 1836 | | Felipe Santiago Salaverry | Minister plenipotentiary; final representative before the establishment of the Peru–Bolivian Confederation. |
| Matías León | | 1839 | | Agustín Gamarra | Minister plenipotentiary |
| Lucas Pellicer | | 1841 | | Manuel Menéndez | Minister plenipotentiary |
| Juan Gutiérrez de la Fuente | | 1842 | | Juan Crisóstomo Torrico | Chargé d'affairs |
| Francisco Rivero | | 1843 | | Justo Figuerola | Chargé d'affairs |
| Benito Laso de la Vega | | 1845 | | Ramón Castilla | Minister plenipotentiary |
| Felipe Pardo y Aliaga | | 1846 | | Ramón Castilla | Minister plenipotentiary |
| José Pardo y Aliaga | | 1848; 1852 | | José Rufino Echenique | Minister plenipotentiary |
| Cipriano Coronel Zegarra | | 1855; 1856 | 1856 | Ramón Castilla | Minister plenipotentiary, then resident minister |
| Juan Manuel Polar | | 1859 | | Ramón Castilla | Minister plenipotentiary |
| Manuel Ignacio de Vivanco | | April 16, 1863 | November 14, 1863 | Ramón Castilla | Minister plenipotentiary |
| Melchor García | | 1864 | | Ramón Castilla | Chargé d'affairs |
| Carlos Fernández Prada | | 1865 | | Mariano Ignacio Prado | Chargé d'affairs |
| Mariano Moreira | | 1866 | | Mariano Ignacio Prado | Chargé d'affairs |
| José Pardo y Aliaga | | 1866 | | Mariano Ignacio Prado | Minister plenipotentiary |
| Benigno González Vigil | | 1868 | | Luis La Puerta | Resident minister |
| Ignacio Noboa | | 1869 | | Luis La Puerta | Chargé d'affairs |
| Felipe Masias | | 1870 | | Luis La Puerta | |
| Ignacio Noboa | | 1870 | | Luis La Puerta | Resident minister |
| Ignacio Noboa | | 1872 | | Tomás Gutiérrez | Minister plenipotentiary |
| Agustín Reynaldo Chacaltana | | 1874 | | Manuel Pardo | Minister plenipotentiary |
| José Pardo y Aliaga | | 1875 | | Manuel Pardo | Minister plenipotentiary |
| Félix Cipriano Coronel Zegarra | | 1875 | | Manuel Pardo | Interim chargé d'affairs |
| Pedro Paz Soldán y Unanue | | | | Mariano Ignacio Prado | Chargé d'affairs |
| José Antonio de Lavalle | | 1879 | 1879 | Nicolás de Piérola | Minister plenipotentiary; Relations with Chile were severed as a result of the Chilean declaration of war against Peru in 1879. |
| José Antonio de Lavalle and Mariano Castro Zaldívar | | 1883 | 1883 | Miguel Iglesias | Plenipotentiary ministers and signatories of the Treaty of Ancón between Chile and Miguel Iglesias' government. |
| Vidal García y García | | 1884 | 1885 | Miguel Iglesias | Minister plenipotentiary |
| Carlos Maria Elías y de la Quintana | | 1885 | 1885 | Andrés Avelino Cáceres | Minister plenipotentiary; sent to protest against the Chilean occupation of Tarata. Relations were against severed in 1887. |
| Carlos Maria Elías y de la Quintana | | 1889 | | Andrés Avelino Cáceres | Minister plenipotentiary |
| Manuel María Rivas Pereira | | 1891 | 1892 | Remigio Morales Bermúdez | Minister plenipotentiary. Deceased in office (1892). |
| Manuel A. San Juan | | 1892 | 1892 | Remigio Morales Bermúdez | Chargé d'affairs. |
| Carlos Wiesse Portocarrero | | 1892 | | Remigio Morales Bermúdez | Minister plenipotentiary |
| Ramón Ribeyro | | 1893 | | Remigio Morales Bermúdez | Minister plenipotentiary |
| Melitón Porras Osores | | 1895 | | Manuel Candamo | Minister plenipotentiary |
| Manuel Benavides Canduela | | 1898 | | Nicolás de Piérola | Minister plenipotentiary |
| Guillermo Billinghurst | | 1898 | | Nicolás de Piérola | Minister plenipotentiary |
| Manuel Benavides Canduela | | 1898 | | Nicolás de Piérola | Minister plenipotentiary |
| Cesáreo Chacaltana Reyes | | 1900 | | Eduardo López de Romaña | Minister plenipotentiary |
| Manuel Álvarez Calderón | | 1901 | | Eduardo López de Romaña | Minister plenipotentiary |
| Manuel Álvarez Calderón | | 1905 | | Serapio Calderón | Minister plenipotentiary |
| Alberto Rey de Castro y Romaña | | 1907 | | Serapio Calderón | Chargé d'affairs |
| Guillermo Seoane | | 1907 | | Serapio Calderón | Minister plenipotentiary |
| Carlos Álvarez Calderón | | 1908 | | Augusto B. Leguía | Minister plenipotentiary |
| Enrique Castro Oyanguren | | | | Augusto B. Leguía | Chargé d'affairs |
| Arturo García Salazar | | 1909 | 1909 | Augusto B. Leguía | As Chargé d'affairs. Relations were again severed in 1910 due to the Tacna–Arica dispute. |
| César Elguera | | 1928 | | Augusto B. Leguía | As Ambassador. Relations were again severed in 1928 due to the same reason. |
| Emilio del Solar | | 1930 | | Luis Miguel Sánchez Cerro | Interim chargé d'affairs |
| Ricardo Boza Aizcorbe | | 1931 | | Luis Miguel Sánchez Cerro | Interim chargé d'affairs |
| Pedro Yrigoyen Diez Canseco | | 1932 | 1937 | Luis Miguel Sánchez Cerro | Ambassador |
| Carlos Concha Cárdenas | | 1936 | | Óscar R. Benavides | Ambassador |
| Rafael Belaúnde Diez Canseco | | 1938 | | Óscar R. Benavides | Ambassador |
| Germán Aramburu Lecaros | | 1940 | | Manuel Prado Ugarteche | Chargé d'affairs |
| Arturo García Salazar | | 1940 | | Manuel Prado Ugarteche | Ambassador |
| Juan Ignacio Elguera | | 1945 | 1946 | José Luis Bustamante y Rivero | Interim Chargé d'affairs |
| Javier Correa Elias | | 1946 | | José Luis Bustamante y Rivero | Ambassador |
| Carlos Miró-Quesada Laos | | 1942 | 1952 | Manuel A. Odría | Ambassador |
| Alberto Wagner de Reyna | | | | Manuel A. Odría | Interim Chargé d'affairs |
| Alberto Ulloa Sotomayor | | 1952 | | Manuel A. Odría | Ambassador |
| Enrique Goytisolo Bolognesi | | 1954 | | Manuel A. Odría | Ambassador |
| Alberto Wagner de Reyna | | 1954 | | Manuel A. Odría | Interim Chargé d'affairs |
| Juan Miguel Bákula Patiño | | 1961 | | Manuel Prado Ugarteche | Interim Chargé d'affairs |
| Manuel Seoane Corrales | | 1961 | 1962 | Manuel Prado Ugarteche | Ambassador |
| Armando Revoredo Iglesias | | 1963 | | Nicolás Lindley López | Ambassador |
| José Beraún España | | 1966 | | Fernando Belaúnde | Interim Chargé d'affairs |
| Alfonso Arias-Schreiber Pezet | | 1967 | | Fernando Belaúnde | Interim Chargé d'affairs |
| Arturo García García | | 1968 | | Fernando Belaúnde | Ambassador |
| Felipe Bustamante Denegri | | 1970 | | Juan Velasco Alvarado | Interim Chargé d'affairs |
| Carlos Jiménez Vásquez de Velasco | | 1971 | | Juan Velasco Alvarado | Interim Chargé d'affairs |
| Víctor Odicio Tamariz | | 1974 | | Juan Velasco Alvarado | Ambassador |
| José Carlos Mariátegui Arellano | | 1975 | 1975 | Francisco Morales Bermúdez | Ambassador |
| Igor Velásquez Rodríguez | | 1975 | | Francisco Morales Bermúdez | Interim Chargé d'affairs |
| Guillermo Arbulú Galliani | | 1978 | 1978 | Francisco Morales Bermúdez | Ambassador |
| Alberto Montagne Vidal | | 1978 | | Francisco Morales Bermúdez | Interim Chargé d'affairs |
| Gustavo Teixeira Giraldo | | 1979 | | Francisco Morales Bermúdez | Interim Chargé d'affairs |
| José Luis Bustamante y Rivero | | 1981 | | Fernando Belaúnde | Interim Chargé d'affairs |
| Alejandro Gordillo Fernández | | 1981 | | Fernando Belaúnde | Interim Chargé d'affairs |
| José Emilio Romero Cevallos | | 1985 | | Alan García | Interim Chargé d'affairs |
| Luis Marchand | | 1986 | | Alan García | Ambassador |
| Alfonso Rivero Monsalve | | 1990 | | Alberto Fujimori | Ambassador |
| Jorge Colunge Villacorta | | 1996 | | Alberto Fujimori | Ambassador |
| Jorge Colunge Villacorta | | 1998 | | Alberto Fujimori | Ambassador |
| José Antonio Meier Espinosa | | 2002 | | Alejandro Toledo | Ambassador |
| Hugo Otero Lanzarotti | | 2006 | | Alan García | Ambassador |
| Carlos Pareja Ríos | | 2009 | | Ollanta Humala | Ambassador |
| Fernando Rojas | | 2014 | | Ollanta Humala | Ambassador |
| Jorge Luis Valdés Carrillo | | 2016 | | Pedro Pablo Kuczynski | Ambassador |
| Jaime Antonio Pomareda Montenegro | | September 1, 2020 | November 9, 2020 | Martín Vizcarra | Ambassador. Previously, ambassador to the Philippines from 1995 to 1998 and to South Korea from 2012 to 2017. |

== See also ==
- List of ambassadors of Chile to Peru
