= Pasquel =

Pasquel may refer to

- Jorge Pasquel, Mexican businessman
- José Tola Pasquel, Peruvian engineer
- José Manuel Pasquel, Peruvian archbishop
- Keerthi Pasquel, Sri Lankan singer
- Sylvia Pasquel, Mexican actress
