= Luis Pércovich Roca =

Peruvian politician

Prime Minister of Peru
- In office 14 October 1984 – 28 July 1985
- President: Fernando Belaúnde Terry
- Preceded by: Sandro Mariátegui Chiappe
- Succeeded by: Luis Alva Castro

Minister of Foreign Relations
- In office 14 October 1984 – 28 July 1985
- President: Fernando Belaúnde Terry
- Preceded by: Sandro Mariátegui Chiappe
- Succeeded by: Allan Wagner Tizón

Minister of the Interior
- In office 21 April 1983 – 12 October 1984
- President: Fernando Belaúnde Terry
- Preceded by: Fernando Rincón Bazo
- Succeeded by: Óscar Brush Noel

Minister of Fishery
- In office 3 January 1983 – 20 April 1983
- President: Fernando Belaúnde Terry
- Preceded by: René Deustua Jameson
- Succeeded by: Fortunato Quesada Lagarrigue

President of Congress
- In office 27 July 1981 – 27 July 1982
- President: Fernando Belaúnde Terry
- Preceded by: Francisco Belaúnde Terry
- Succeeded by: Valentín Paniagua

Personal details
- Born: 14 July 1931 Yungay, Peru
- Died: 23 April 2017 (aged 85) Lima, Peru
- Party: Acción Popular
- Education: National University of Trujillo
- Profession: Pharmacist

Luis Pércovich Roca (14 July 1931 – 23 April 2017) was a Peruvian politician. Pércovich served as the President of the Congress of the Republic of Peru from July 1981 to July 1982. He served as Prime Minister of Peru from 14 October 1984 to 28 July 1985.

== Biography ==
He was born in Yungay city on 14 July 1931. Son of the Yungaíno marriage formed between the architect Gerónimo Pércovich and the lady Rosa Roca Osorio. Grandson of the Croatian-Austrian engineer Miguel Perković, from Dalmatia, and Dr. Asunción Roca, a native of Yurma, Piscobamba. He completed his primary and secondary studies at the Salesian College of Yungay and continued his career as a pharmaceutical chemist at the National University of Trujillo, where he was leader of the University Front, graduating in 1954.

He married Haydeé Bambarén, with whom he had three children: Luis Alfredo, Jorge Antonio and María Gabriela. In Chimbote he dedicated himself to commerce, establishing the Santa Virginia Pharmacy in said city and, later, the Fátima Pharmacy, the last of which was located on the fifth block of Jr. Leoncio Prado. Likewise, he is the owner of the ‘Presidente’ and ‘Riviera’ hotels in the same city.

Luis Percovich was Catholic and a devout of Our Lady of Fatima. His social vocation led him to join the Corps of Volunteer Firefighters of Peru. He came to command the Salvadora Company Chimbote No. 33 (1962-1963). In 1965 he was elected vice dean of the Pharmaceutical Chemical College of Peru.

Regarding politics, he is one of the founders of Acción Popular. Since 1956 accompanied the architect Fernando Belaúnde to tour the mountains of Ancash: “I been with him on the roads from Chacas to Pomabamba, from Pomabamba to Luzuriaga, from Luzuriaga to Sihuas, from Corongo to Pallasca, in countless places, not seeking the great masses or the great popular concentrations, but seeking to know the situation of each of these small towns, of the villages, small communities to know personally about their needs”.

His parliamentary activity began in 1963, when he was elected Representative for the Department of Ancash. His legislative mandate was interrupted by the coup, headed by General Juan Velasco Alvarado, on 3 October 1968.

In 1980 he was elected Deputy again. On 27 July 1981 he was elected President of the House of Representatives (Camara de Diputados). During the second government of President Belaunde (1980-1985) held various portfolios. He was Minister of Fisheries (3 January - 20 April 1983), Minister of the Interior (21 April 1983 - 15 April 1984) and Prime Minister and Minister of Foreign Affairs (12 October 1984 - 27 July 1985).

During his management at the head of the Ministry of the Interior, the Anti-Terrorism Division was created. Terrorism (DIRCOTE), unit of the Investigative Police of Peru (PIP), which proceeded to identify the political and military commanders of Sendero Luminoso, its action, propaganda and logistics systems. Furthermore, they created the Regional Schools of the Official Forces. Likewise, he had to face a protest led by police officers requesting improvements in salaries. Pércovich managed and obtained the necessary resources from the Ministry of Economy and Finance to finance the increase in salaries, made the announcement to the media and moved unexpectedly to the El Sexto Prison, where a mutiny had occurred, to explain the measures adopted, causing the rebels to abandon their attitude.
