= Cesáreo Chacaltana Reyes =

Peruvian lawyer, jurist, diplomat and politician

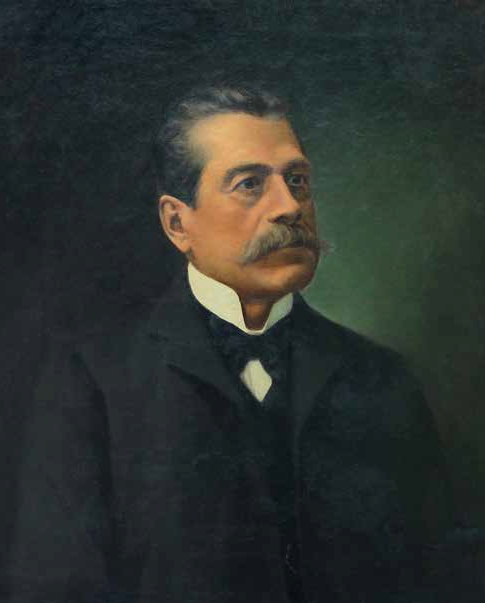
Cesáreo Chacaltana Reyes

Cesáreo Chacaltana Reyes (February 25, 1845 – November 14, 1906) was a Peruvian lawyer, jurist, diplomat and politician. He was born in Lima, Peru. He graduated from the National University of San Marcos and served on its faculty. He was a member of the Civilista Party. He was mayor of Lima in 1886. He was a member of the Chamber of Deputies of Peru and Senate of Peru. He served as minister of foreign affairs and interior in the Government of Peru, and also served as Minister to Argentina, Uruguay, Paraguay, and Chile. He served twice as Prime Minister of Peru (August–November 1894, September 1901 – August 1902) and briefly second vice president of Peru from 1894 to 1895. He served as the President of the Chamber of Deputies from 1904 to 1905.

Preceded by César Canevaro	Mayor of Lima; 1886	Succeeded by César Canevaro
Preceded by Ramón Ribeyro	Minister of Foreign Affairs of Peru; November 22, 1886 – August 22, 1887	Succeeded by Carlos Maria Elías y de la Quintana
Preceded by Ramón Ribeyro	Minister of Foreign Affairs of Peru; March 3 – May 11, 1893	Succeeded by José Mariano Jiménez
Preceded by Baltasar García Urrutia	Prime Minister of Peru; August 10 – November 16, 1894	Succeeded by Manuel Irigoyen Larrea
Preceded by	Minister of the Interior of Peru; August 10 – November 13, 1894	Succeeded by Salvador Cavero
Preceded by Domingo M. Almenara Butler	Prime Minister of Peru; September 11, 1901 – August 9, 1902	Succeeded by Cesáreo Octavio Deustua Escarza
Preceded by Anselmo Barreto	Minister of Foreign Affairs of Peru; September 11, 1901 – August 10, 1902	Succeeded by Aníbal Villegas

== Works ==
- Patronato Nacional Argentino. Cuestiones de actualidad sobre las recíprocas relaciones de la Iglesia y el Estado (Buenos Aires, 1895).
- Programa de Derecho Civil Común (1896).
- Derecho Civil Común (1897).

== Bibliography ==
- Basadre, Jorge: Historia de la República del Perú. 1822 - 1933, Octava Edición, corregida y aumentada. Tomos 8 y 9. Editada por el Diario "La República" de Lima y la Universidad "Ricardo Palma". Impreso en Santiago de Chile, 1998.
- Tauro del Pino, Alberto: Enciclopedia Ilustrada del Perú. Tercera Edición. Tomo 4, CAN/CHO. Lima, PEISA, 2001. ISBN 9972-40-153-3
