= Carlos Miró-Quesada Laos =

Peruvian diplomat

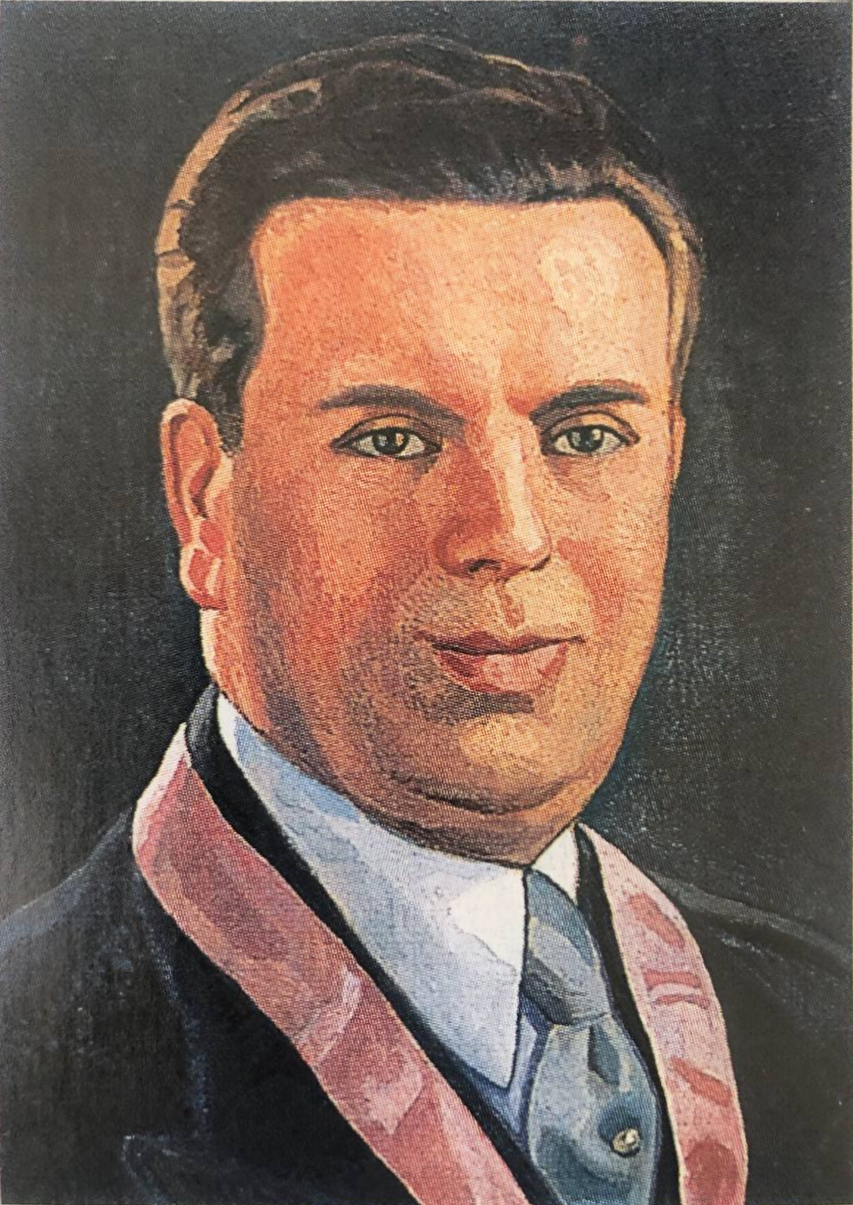

Ambassador of Peru to Belgium
- In office April 1969 – November 1969

Personal details
- Born: October 19, 1903 Lima, Peru
- Died: November 4, 1969 (aged 66) Brussels, Belgium
- Resting place: Presbítero Maestro
- Party: Renovación Nacional
- Spouse: Rosa Moreyra y Paz-Soldán
- Children: 2
- Parent(s): Antonio Miró Quesada; María Laos Argüelles
- Relatives: Miró Quesada family
- Education: Colegio de la Inmaculada; Tome School; University of Oxford; University of Paris; University of San Marcos
- Awards: Order of Merit of Italy
- Affiliations: National Club

Carlos Miró Quesada Laos (Lima; October 19, 1903 — Brussels; November 4, 1969) was a Peruvian journalist, politician and diplomat.

== Biography ==
Born in Lima on October 19, 1903, he was the son of Antonio Miró Quesada de la Guerra and María Laos Argüelles. His father, a renowned politician and journalist, was president of Congress and director of El Comercio. He completed his school studies at the Inmaculada School in Lima and at the Tome School in Maryland, and completed higher education at the universities of Oxford, La Sorbonne and San Marcos, graduating as a lawyer in Lima (1932).

In 1936, he married Rosa Moreyra y Paz-Soldán, with whom he had an only daughter. Later, he had two more daughters with Beatriz Eguren Carranza.

In 1921, he joined El Comercio, being director of its evening edition from 1928 to 1934 (with an interruption in 1929 when he was confined in San Lorenzo by the government of Augusto B. Leguía). The following year, both of his parents were murdered in an attack perpetrated by an Aprista Party leader, so the general direction of the newspaper passed to his uncle Aurelio Miró Quesada, while the sub-directorship went to him. Considered one of the main defenders and propagandists of fascism in his country, he was deported by the government of Óscar R. Benavides in 1937, so he remained in Europe, travelling through Western Europe until the departure of the military regime in 1940.

In 1944, he founded the conservative party with an anti-APRA tendency Renovación Nacional, which had a medium political presence and from which he ran for senator for Callao in 1945. This year he moved to Argentina, where he remained three years dedicated to academic and journalistic activities as a collaborator of La Nación and Clarín in Buenos Aires, and El Mercurio in Chile.

In 1949, he entered the diplomatic service and the military government of Manuel A. Odría appointed him ambassador to Chile, a position in which he remained until 1952, when he was transferred to the Peruvian embassy in Mexico. From this position he intervened in the resumption of diplomatic relations between Peru and Costa Rica, for which he was sent on a special mission to this country and then to Nicaragua. In 1953, he was appointed ambassador in Rio de Janeiro, a position he held until 1954 when he irrevocably resigned due to Odría's decision to allow Víctor Raúl Haya de la Torre to leave the country. In 1956, he declined his candidacy for the presidency of Peru.

Upon his return to Lima, he joined the conspiracy to place General Zenón Noriega Agüero in the government, but when the plot was discovered, he took refuge in the Brazilian embassy and then went into exile to Chile. In 1956, with the military regime severely deteriorating, Odría allowed the return of his political enemies and called for general elections. In them, Miró-Quesada presented himself as a National Restoration candidate for the Presidency with the intention of later withdrawing his nomination in favor of Manuel Prado and making the anti-APRA vote more solid; However, Prado, unsure of his victory, allied himself with Apra, so Miró-Quesada immediately withdrew his support. In 1962, he supported the candidacy of Fernando Belaúnde against that of Haya and in the same way in 1963.

From 1963 to 1966, he was Peru's ambassador to Belgium and then to Italy until 1968 when he resigned due to the government's decision to apologise to Armando Villanueva, president of the Chamber of Deputies whom he had refused to receive in Rome. After Belaúnde's fall, Juan Velasco Alvarado's military government restored him as ambassador to Italy (1969) and then again to Belgium (April–November 1969). Miró-Quesada died on November 4, 1969, in a hospital in Brussels, two weeks after suffering a vehicle accident.

In 2016, his grandson José Carlos Yrigoyen published his biography titled Orgullosamente solos (Proudly alone), in which he details his relationships with fascism, as well as his post-war political career.
