= Francisco de Paula González Vigil =

Peruvian politician and writer (1792–1875)

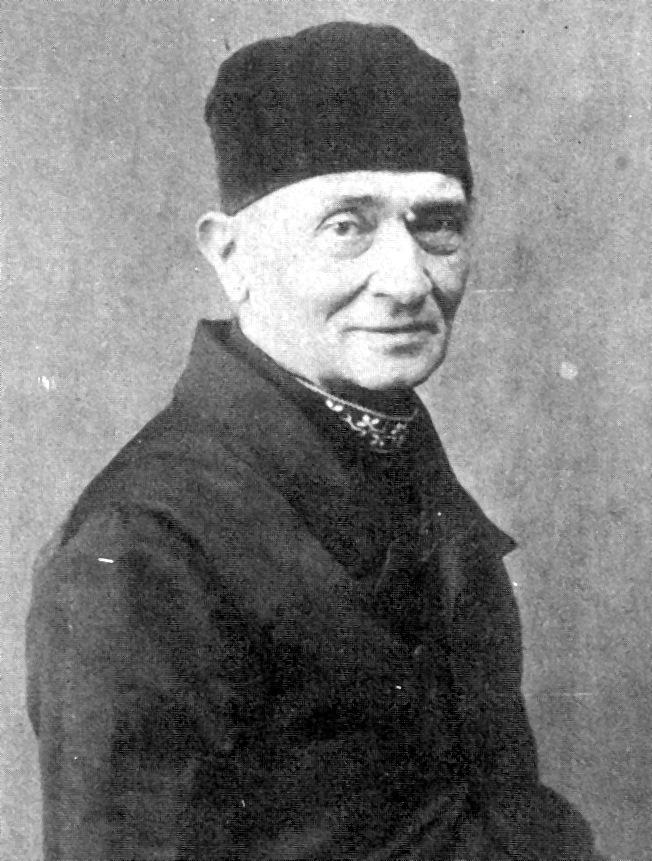
- Born: Francisco de Paula González Vigil; September 13, 1792; Tacna, Viceroyalty of Peru, Spanish Empire
- Died: June 9, 1875 (aged 82); Lima, Peru
- Writing career
- Literary movement: liberal

Francisco de Paula González Vigil (September 13, 1792 – June 9, 1875) was a Peruvian writer, scholar, librarian and politician.

Father: Joaquín González Vigil; mother: María Micaela Yáñez

== Biography ==
Francisco de Paula González Vigil was born into a family that was living in Tacna after migrating from the province. His mother was María Micaela Yáñez and his father was Joaquín González Vigil. He served as the President of the Constituent Congress in 1833 and 1834.

== Works ==
- Defensa de la autoridad de los gobiernos contra las pretensiones de la curia romana (6 vols., 1848–1849).
- Defensa de la autoridad de los obispos contra las pretensiones de la curia romana (4 vols., 1856).
- Los jesuitas presentados en cuadros históricos, sobre las correspondientes pruebas y con reflexiones al caso, especialmente en sus cosas de América (1863, 4 tomos), dedicado al papa Clemente XIV.
- Catecismo patriótico para uso en escuelas municipales en forma de diálogos (1858); que redactó por especial pedido de la municipalidad del Callao.
- Opúsculos sociales y políticos, sobre diversos temas, entre los que destacan:
  - "Paz perpetua en América o Federación Americana" (1856), proponiendo una confederación de todas las naciones independientes de Latinoamérica, sin excluir a los Estados Unidos.
  - "Roma", contra el poder temporal del romano pontífice (1871)
  - "Impugnación de un folleto defensor de la monarquía" (1867).

== Secondary sources ==
- Basadre, Jorge: Historia de la República del Perú. 1822 – 1933, Octava Edición, corregida y aumentada. Tomos 2, 3 y 4. Editada por el Diario "La República" de Lima y la Universidad "Ricardo Palma". Impreso en Santiago de Chile, 1998.
- Pérez Pimentel, Rodolfo: Diccionario Biográfico del Ecuador. Francisco González Vigil.
- Vargas Ugarte, Rubén: Historia General del Perú. Octavo Tomo. Primera Edición. Editor Carlos Milla Batres. Lima, Perú, 1971.
- Varios autores: Grandes Forjadores del Perú. Lima, Lexus Editores, 2000. ISBN 9972-625-50-8
- Varios autores: Historia del Perú. Lima, Lexus Editores, 2000. ISBN 9972-625-35-4
- Tauro del Pino, Alberto: Enciclopedia Ilustrada del Perú. Tercera Edición. Tomo 17. VAC-ZUZ. Lima, PEISA, 2001. ISBN 9972-40-166-9

== See also ==
- Peruvian literature
- List of Peruvian writers
- Congress of the Republic of Peru
- Pedro José Chávez de la Rosa
- Francisco Xavier de Luna Pizarro
