= Reformist Democratic Party =

Reformist Democratic Party Partido Democrático Reformista
- Leader: Augusto B. Leguía
- Founded: 1920
- Dissolved: February 6, 1932
- Headquarters: Lima
- Ideology: Authoritarianism; Economic liberalism Conservatism

Reformist Democratic Party (in Spanish: Partido Democrático Reformista) was a political party in Peru. It was founded in 1920 by Augusto Bernardino Leguía y Salcedo, whose regime, which began the previous year, had led to a dictatorial government. It was a party with a strong personal character, whose members included the friends and relatives of President Leguía, as well as many public employees. It lacked an ideology and an authentic program and was only organized to support Leguía in the perpetuation of him in power. After the fall of Leguía in 1930, it did not again have a leading role in Peruvian politics and ended up dissolving.

== Context ==
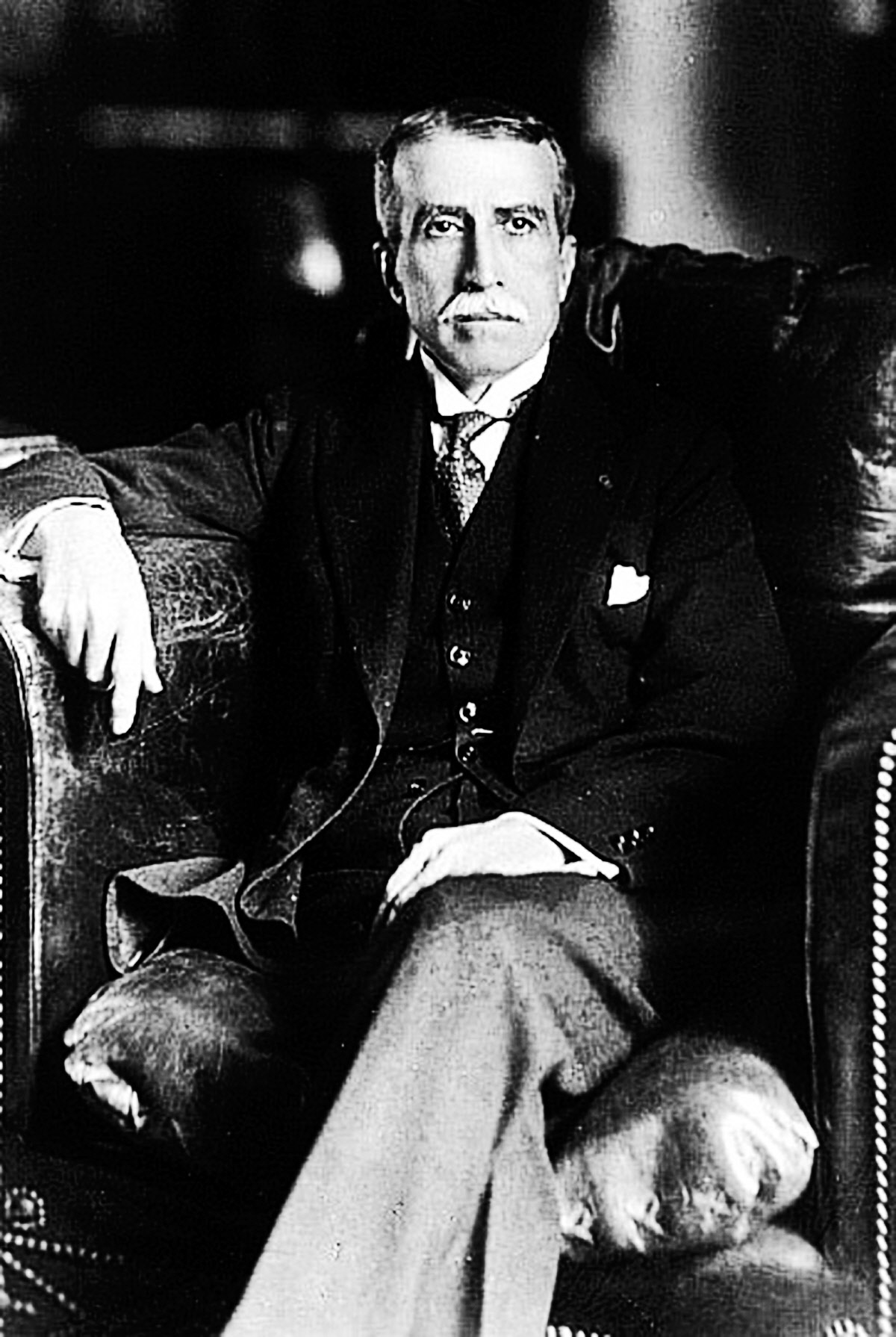
Augusto B. Leguía y Salcedo, president of Peru and founder of the Reformist Democratic Party.

At the end of the second government of President José Pardo y Barreda (of the Civilista Party), elections were called in 1919. The former president Augusto B. Leguía returned to Peru and launched his candidacy, supported by the Constitutional Party, whose leader was General Andrés Avelino Cáceres.

Leguía presented himself as the standard bearer for a radical change in the country's structures. He proposed a series of reforms grouped around the idea of a "New Homeland", thus obtaining the support of a people hit by the social and economic crisis and who longed for such a change, after the failure of the civilistas. The same university students gave him his support and proclaimed him "Teacher of Youth", despite the fact that Leguía never had any academic title.

Leguía's victory was inevitable, as there was no other more popular candidate. But claiming that his victory was not going to be recognized by the civilista government, Leguía staged a coup d'état on July 4, 1919, supported by the gendarmerie. Immediately afterwards, he assumed power as interim president and dissolved Congress.

The next step for Leguía was to legalize his power. He proposed a plebiscite for a series of constitutional reforms that he considered necessary. These reforms included electing the President of the Republic and Congress at the same time, both with terms of five years (previously, the presidential term was four years and Parliament was renewed by thirds every two years). In this way, the Executive avoided having a parliament with an adverse majority. He simultaneously called elections to elect the representatives of a National Assembly, which during its first 30 days would be in charge of ratifying the constitutional reforms, that is, it would act as a Constituent Assembly.

The National Assembly was installed on September 24, 1919, and was chaired by the sociologist and jurisconsult Mariano H. Cornejo. One of the first tasks of said Assembly was to count the votes of the previous presidential elections, after which it ratified Leguía as the winner, who was proclaimed Constitutional President on October 12, 1919. The Constitution of Peru was subsequently re-written.

This second Leguía government would last for eleven years, since, after constitutional reforms, he was re-elected in 1924 and in 1929. That is why it is also known as the Oncenio.

During this eleventh year, the two most important traditional parties, the Civil and the Democratic, ceased to have validity. Only Leguía's allied party, the Constitutional party, led by the aging General Cáceres, remained. He was promoted to the high rank of grand marshal, by the Congress.

To stay in power, Leguía subdued the press and unleashed a relentless persecution against his political adversaries. On the other hand, he undertook the modernization of Peru, carrying out important and numerous public works.

== Foundation ==
It was in this context that President Leguía decided to found his own political party, which he called Democrático Reformista, with an initial program, which did not contribute anything apart from what was already said by Leguía in his previous speeches, added to his objective of protecting the indigenous race (which in practice would never be realized during the time that the Oncenio lasted).

The party statutes were drawn up by Germán Leguía y Martínez, and were published in the official gazette El Peruano. The first provisional president of the party was Major Esteban Cobilich and incumbent president Guillermo Rey. In 1925, Roberto Leguía, Augusto's brother, assumed the presidency; from that year, until the fall of Leguía in 1930, the members of the Board of Directors remained in their positions. In one of the articles of said Statute it was explicitly stated that the head of the party was Augusto B. Leguía himself, who in practice decided all the actions carried out by the party.

== Germancism ==
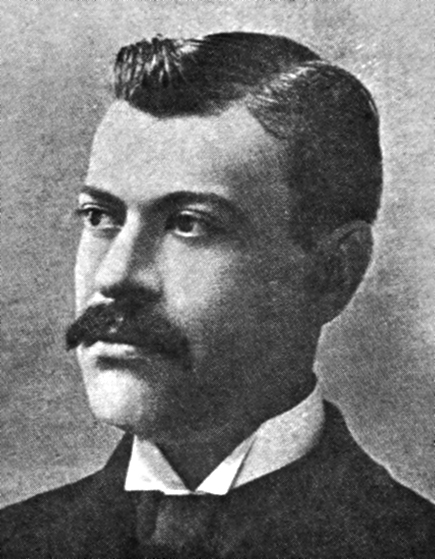
Germán Leguía y Martínez

Within leguiísmo, a kind of left wing arose, known as Germancismo, named after meeting around the figure of Germán Leguía y Martínez, the president's cousin, who had been in office since the end of 1919 as Prime Minister and Minister of Government. As such, he had carried out the arduous task of ensuring presidential absolutism, committing a series of outrages: he flouted judicial rulings, expropriated the newspaper La Prensa, ignored the parliamentary jurisdiction, persecuted and imprisoned or exiled the enemies of the regime.

Some, within the leguiísta party, saw Germán Leguía as the ideal successor of President Leguía; The latter surrounded himself with unconditional collaborators, and there was already talk of a "Germancist" party, when suddenly Augusto B. Leguía himself made known his intention of being reelected, for which he ordered to amend the Constitution. Germán Leguía opposed this and, in protest against it, resigned from his ministerial position on October 7, 1922. He denounced the presidential re-election, considering it a very serious mistake. Later he was arrested and deported with his entire family. "Germancism" ended up being diluted.

== Resurgence ==
Long after the fall and death of Leguía, the Reformist Democratic Party re-emerged, due to the efforts of the ex-president's daughter, Carmen Leguía. She participated in the elections to elect the Constituent Assembly in 1978, in which she obtained a tiny vote, which did not bring her any seats.
