= Héctor Vargas (disambiguation) =

Héctor Vargas (born 1959) is an Argentinian football manager.

Héctor Vargas may also refer to:

- Héctor Vargas Bastidas (1951–2022), Chilean prelate of the Roman Catholic Church
- Héctor Vargas Haya (1928–2026), Peruvian politician (APRA)
