= Peru presidential line of succession =

Constitutional President of the Republic of Peru
- Presidente Constitucional de la República del Perú
- Presidential standard

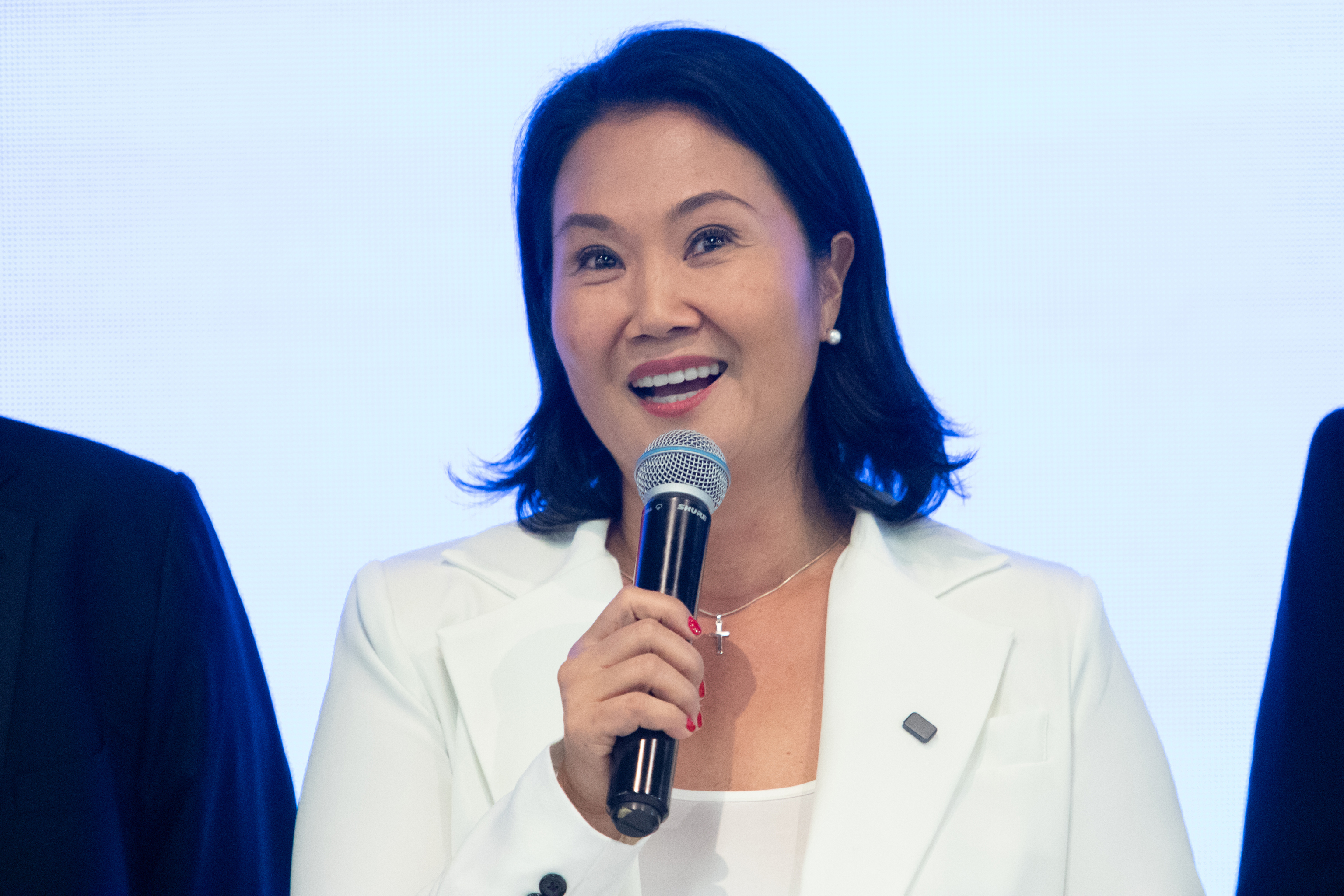
- Incumbent; Keiko Fujimori since 28 July 2026
- Style: Madam President (informal); Her Excellency (formal, diplomatic)
- Status: Head of state Head of government

The presidential line of succession of Peru defines the order of officials who, in the event of "temporary or permanent impediment of the President," may assume the office of President of Peru.

The line of succession is established in Article 115 of the Political Constitution of Peru. In the event of the President’s inability to fulfill their duties, the First Vice President shall assume the presidency, followed by the Second Vice President if the First Vice President is likewise unable to serve.

Should both Vice Presidents be incapacitated, the President of Congress shall assume the presidency. In cases of the President’s permanent impediment, the President of Congress is mandated to promptly convene general elections.

== Legal points ==
Article 113 of the Peruvian Constitution establishes a series of situations in which the Presidency of the Republic would become vacant. These are:

- Death of the President of the Republic;
- His permanent moral or physical incapacity, declared by the Congress;
- Acceptance of his resignation by Congress;
- Leaving the national territory without permission from Congress or failing to return to it within the established period;
- Dismissal, after having been sanctioned for any of the violations mentioned in Article 117 of the Constitution.

Meanwhile, Article 114 establishes that the exercise of the Presidency is suspended for the following reasons:

- Temporary incapacity of the President, declared by Congress;
- This person is subject to judicial proceedings, in accordance with Article 117 of the Constitution

== Current order ==
In the event of "temporary or permanent impediment of the President of the Republic," the line of succession establishes that the First Vice President or, failing that, the Second Vice President of the Republic assumes office, each of whom must complete the presidential term.

No.	Office	Incumbent	Party
1	Constitutional President of the Republic	Keiko Fujimori	FP
2	First Vice President	Luis Galarreta	FP
3	Second Vice President	Miki Torres	FP
4	President of Congress	Miki Torres	FP
