= Víctor Paredes Guerra =

Peruvian academic and politician (1944–2022)

Víctor Felipe Paredes Guerra

Minister of Health
- In office 6 November 1991 – 28 August 1993
- Preceded by: Víctor Yamamoto Miyakawa
- Succeeded by: Jaime Freundt-Thurne

President of the Congress of the Republic of Peru
- In office 26 July 1990 – 26 July 1991
- Preceded by: Luis Alvarado Contreras
- Succeeded by: Roberto Ramírez del Villar

Member of the Congress of the Republic of Peru
- In office 27 July 1990 – 5 April 1992

Personal details
- Born: 20 April 1944; Lima, Peru
- Died: 26 January 2022 (aged 77); Lima, Peru
- Political party: Cambio 90; FP
- Occupation: Professor

Víctor Felipe Paredes Guerra (20 April 1944 – 26 January 2022) was a Peruvian academic and politician.

== Biography ==
A member of Cambio 90 and the Popular Force, he served in the Congress of the Republic of Peru from 1990 to 1992 and was its President from 1990 to 1991. He was also Minister of Health from 1991 to 1993.

He died from COVID-19 in Lima on 26 January 2022, at the age of 77.
