= Rafael Fernández de Villanueva Cortez =

Peruvian statesman and lawyer (1839–1931)

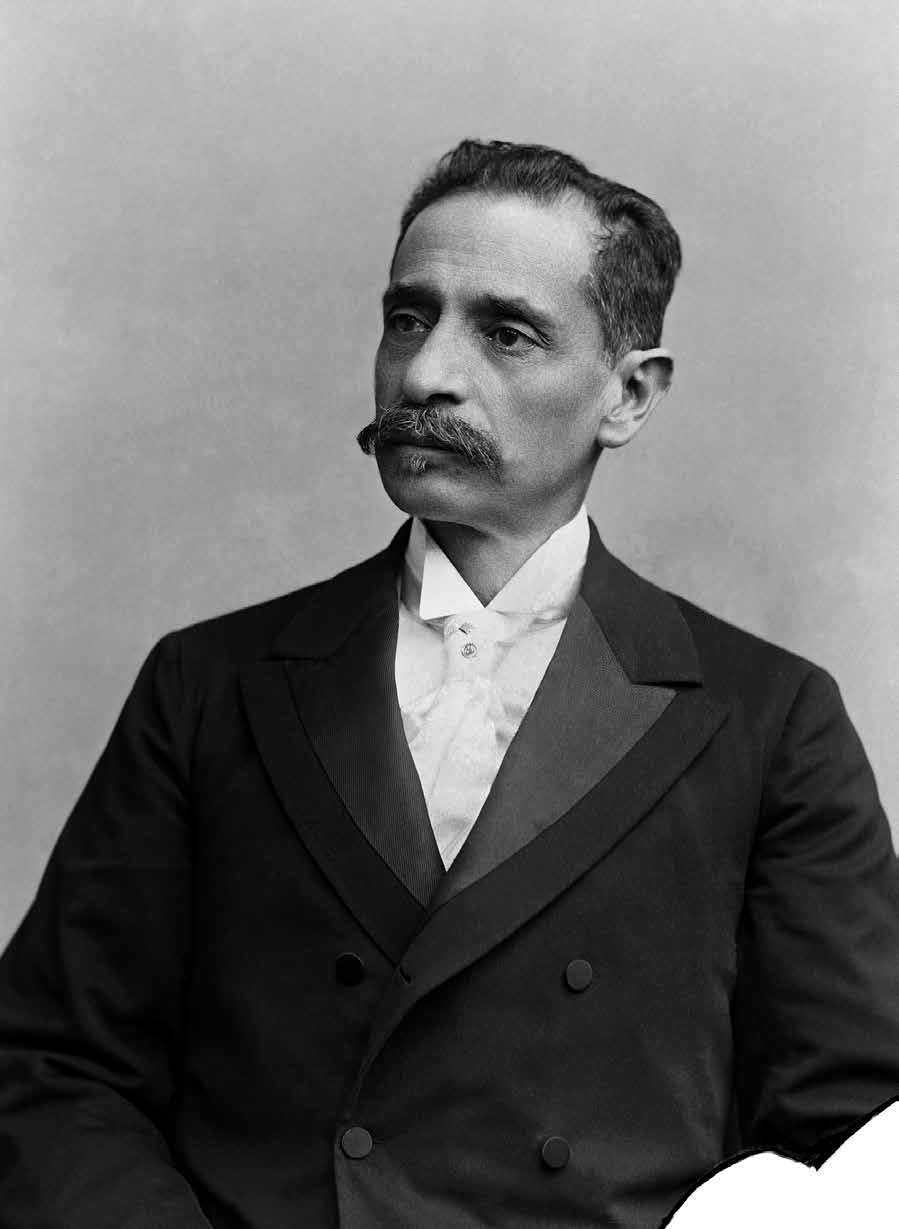

Prime Minister of Peru
- In office 8 June 1909 – 14 March 1910
- President: Augusto B. Leguía
- Preceded by: Eulogio I. Romero Salcedo
- Succeeded by: Javier Prado y Ugarteche

Personal details
- Born: 30 November 1839
- Died: 1931 (aged 91–92)
- Party: Civilista Party

Rafael Fernández de Villanueva Cortez (30 November 1839 – 1931) was a Peruvian statesman and lawyer who served as Prime Minister of Peru from 1909 to 1910.

== Life and career ==
=== Early life ===
Rafael Fernández de Villanueva Cortez was born on 30 November 1839.

=== Political career ===
He served as Prime Minister of Peru from 1909 to 1910.

=== Death ===
He died in 1931.
