= Nicanor Carmona =

Peruvian politician (1842–1940)

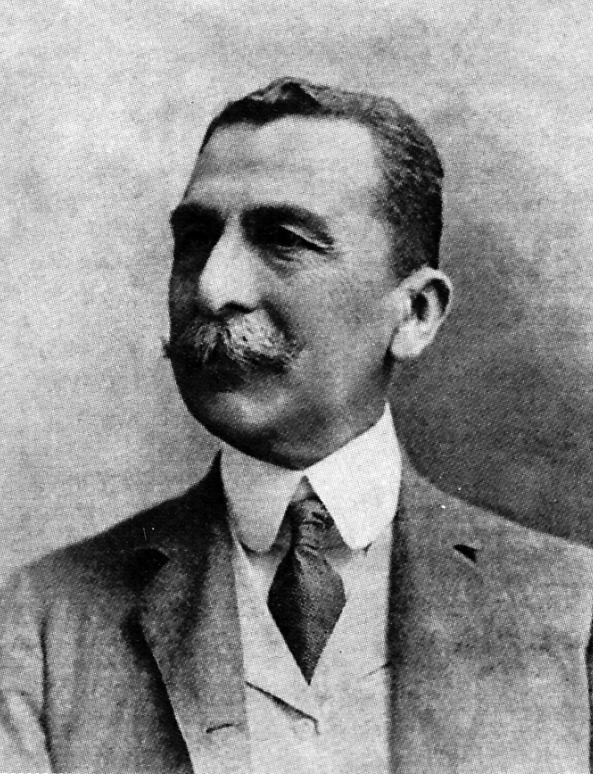
Nicanor Carmona

Nicanor Carmona (1842–1940) was a Peruvian politician. He was Minister of Finance in 1894. He was twice the mayor of Lima, first from 1910 to 1913, and second from 1915 to 1916. He was president of the President of the Senate from 1914 to 1915.

Preceded by Guillermo Billinghurst Angulo	Mayor of Lima; 1910–1913	Succeeded by Elías Malpartida
Preceded by Elías Malpartida	Mayor of Lima; 1915–1916	Succeeded by Luis Miró Quesada
