= Ántero Aspíllaga =

Peruvian politician

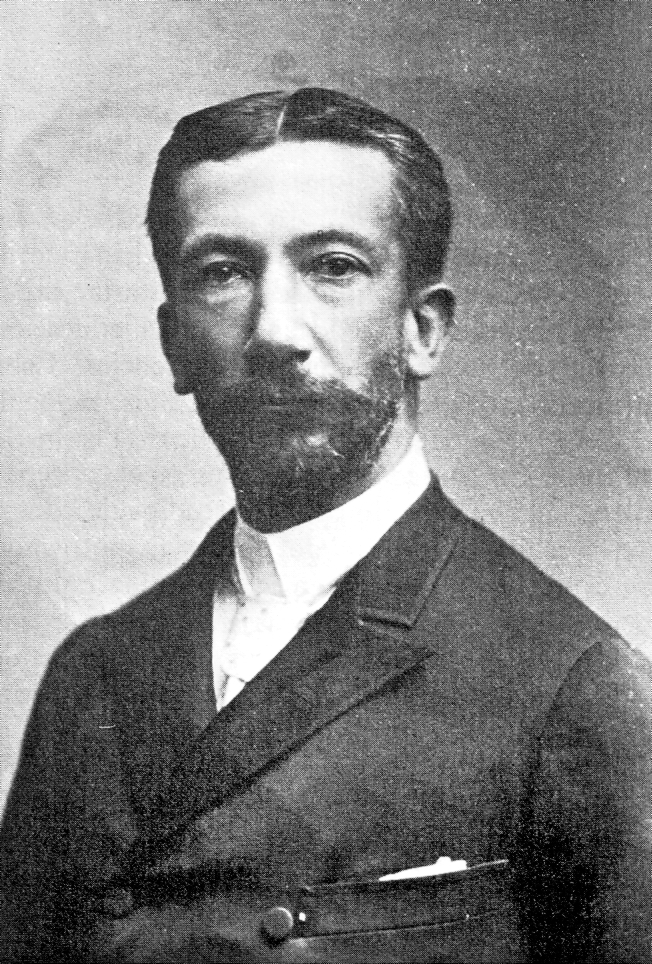

Ministry of Finance (Peru)
- In office 1887–1889
- President: Andrés Avelino Cáceres
- Preceded by: Manuel E. Álvarez
- Succeeded by: Eulogio Delgado

President of the Senate (Peru)
- In office July 28, 1902 – July 28, 1904
- Preceded by: Manuel Candamo Iriarte
- Succeeded by: Rafael Villanueva Cortez
- In office July 28, 1909 – July 28, 1911
- Preceded by: Agustín Ganoza y Cavero
- Succeeded by: Agustín Tovar Aguilar

Mayor of Lima
- In office 1897–1896
- Preceded by: Manuel Pablo Olaechea
- Succeeded by: Juan Martín Echenique

Personal details
- Born: 1849
- Died: December 8, 1927 (aged 77–78)
- Party: Civilista Party
- Spouse: Ana María Argote Nieto
- Parent(s): Ramón Aspíllaga Ferrebú (Father); Melchora Barrera Pérez (Mother)

Ántero Aspíllaga Barrera (1849 — 8 December 1927) was an agricultural businessman and Peruvian politician. He was Minister of Finance (1887–1889), Mayor of Lima (1896–1897), President of the Senate (1902–1903) (1909–1910), twice candidate for President of Peru representing the Civilista Party in 1912 and 1919, and president of the Club Nacional (1917–1919).
