= Roberto Ramírez del Villar =

Peruvian lawyer and politician

President of the Chamber of Deputies
- In office 26 July 1991 – 5 April 1992
- Preceded by: Víctor Felipe Paredes Guerra
- Succeeded by: Jaime Yoshiyama (as President of the Democratic Constituent Congress)

Minister of Justice and Worship
- In office 21 January 1966 – 25 November 1966
- President: Fernando Belaúnde
- Preceded by: Valentín Paniagua
- Succeeded by: Javier Belaúnde Ruiz De Somocurcio

Member of the Chamber of Deputies
- In office 26 July 1980 – 5 April 1992
- Constituency: Lima
- In office 26 July 1963 – 3 October 1968
- Constituency: Lima

Member of the Constituent Assembly
- In office 28 July 1978 – 26 July 1980

Personal details
- Born: 6 May 1920 Arequipa, Peru
- Died: 29 May 1995 (aged 75) Lima, Peru
- Party: Christian People's Party
- Education: National University of San Agustín
- Profession: Lawyer

Roberto Ramírez del Villar Beaumont (6 May 1920 – 29 May 1995) was a Peruvian lawyer and politician. A prominent member of the Christian People's Party, he became a member of the Chamber of Deputies 4 times. He is also known for being the last President of the Chamber of Deputies (1991-1992), the lower house of the Congress of Peru, until the self-coup made by the President Alberto Fujimori.
