= José Manuel Pasquel =

Peruvian archbishop

- Archbishop of Lima
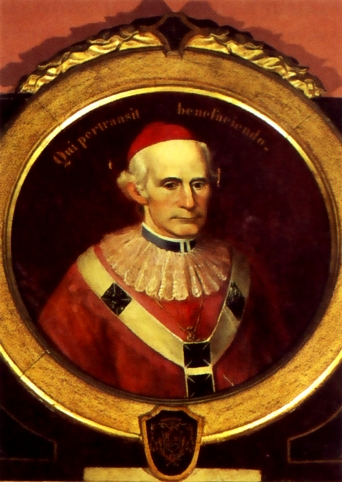
- Church: Catholic Church
- Archdiocese: Archdiocese of Lima
- In office: 28 September 1855 – 15 October 1857
- Predecessor: Francisco Xavier de Luna Pizarro
- Successor: José Sebastián de Goyeneche y Barreda
- Previous posts: Titular Bishop of Erythrae (1848-1855); Auxiliary bishop of Lima (1848-1855)

Orders
- Ordination: 20 September 1817 by Bartolomé María de las Heras
- Consecration: 7 May 1848 by Francisco Xavier de Luna Pizarro

Personal details
- Born: José Manuel Pasquel Losada; 19 March 1793 Lima, Viceroyalty of Peru, Spanish Empire
- Died: 15 October 1857 (aged 64)

José Manuel Pasquel (March 13, 1793 – October 15, 1857) was a Peruvian archbishop.

José Manuel Pasquel was the son of Tomás Pasquel y Garcés and Clara Losada y Palencia. He studied at the San Carlos Convictorio and the Universidad Mayor de San Marcos where he graduated as a Doctor of Theology and Canon Law. He was second lieutenant in the Battalion's number, but was inclined to religious life and entered the Seminary of Santo Toribio in Lima in 1816 . He received Holy Orders in 1817. He served in Huacho and Atavillos Bajo, then transferred to Concepción in the province of Jauja in 1830, the year he was also appointed Chaplain to the Supreme Government.

He was ordained as a bishop in 1848, and installed as Archbishop of Lima on 16 Dec 1855.
