= Francisco Belaúnde =

Peruvian politician (1923–2020)

Francisco Belaúnde Terry (3 October 1923 – 25 August 2020) was a Peruvian politician who served as a member of Congress, in which he served as President of the Chamber of Deputies between 1980 and 1981. His brother Fernando Belaúnde had been twice President. He belongs to the Popular Action party. He died on 25 August 2020 at the age of 96.

== Biography ==
He was born in Lima in 1923 in a family closely linked to politics. He was the son of Rafael Belaunde Diez Canseco and Lucila Terry García. His father was Minister of Government and President of the Council of Ministers in the government of José Luis Bustamante y Rivero (1945–46); his grandfather Mariano A. Belaunde de la Torre was Minister of Finance in the government of Eduardo López de Romaña (1899–1900); his great-grandfather, General Pedro Diez Canseco Corbacho, was interim president on three occasions (1863, 1865 and 1868); and his uncle Víctor Andrés Belaúnde Diez Canseco was a prominent intellectual and diplomat, who became President of the UN General Assembly in 1959, and Minister of Foreign Relations of Peru in 1957.

He studied at different schools in France, the United States, Mexico and Chile. He finished high school at the Colegio Sagrados Corazones Recoleta. He entered the Pontifical Catholic University of Peru, where he studied law. Once he graduated, he dedicated himself to the exercise of his career in private activity.

He died on 25 August 2020 at the age of 96.
