= Democratic Party (Peru) =

Democratic Party Partido Demócrata
- Historical leaders: Nicolás de Piérola, Guillermo Billinghurst
- Founded: 1889
- Dissolved: 1933
- Preceded by: National Party
- Merged into: Republican Action
- Headquarters: Lima
- Ideology: Civic nationalism Decentralization; Merit system
- Political position: Centre-left

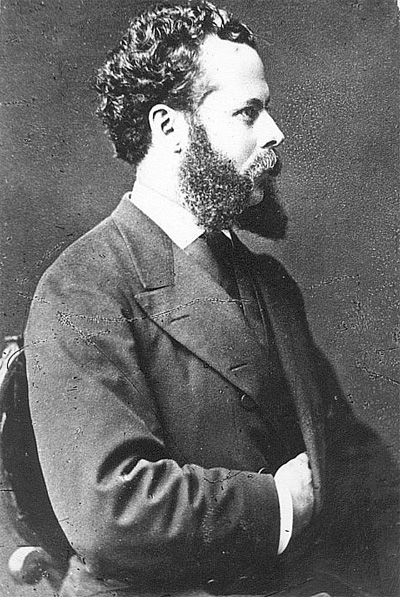
Nicolás de Piérola, founder of the Democratic Party

The Democratic Party (Spanish: Partido Demócrata, PD) was a political party in Peru. It was founded in 1889 by Nicolás de Piérola, who won the presidential elections of 1895. The only other president to be a member of the party was Guillermo Billinghurst, who won the presidential elections of 1912.

Despite the party's large support, mainly between lower classes, the Democratic Party had not many President for his abstention from some elections. It was the main rival of the Civilista Party, identified as an expression of the oligarchy. In 1909, the party supported a revolt against President Augusto B. Leguía's dictatorship, that was repressed in blood.

After Piérola's death in 1913, the party had less support and in 1933, finally merged in the Republican Action with other centrist parties.

The party was anti-military, anti-liberal and pro-Church. The party was primarily supported by wealthy southern landowners, the church hierarchy, and members of middle class who were supportive of traditional Hispanic and Catholic values.
