= Carlos Pedemonte Sabín =

Spanish military officer (1895–1972)

Colonel Carlos Pedemonte Sabín
- Born: 14 October 1895; Havana, Cuba, Kingdom of Spain
- Died: 25 July 1972 (aged 76)
- Military career
- Allegiance: Kingdom of Spain; Second Spanish Republic
- Branch: Spanish Army; Spanish Republican Army
- Service years: ?–1939
- Rank: Lieutenant colonel
- Conflicts: Spanish Civil War
- Other work: Government delegate in Spanish Sahara (1936)

Carlos Pedemonte Sabín (14 October 1895 – 25 July 1972) was a Spanish geographer and military officer.

== Biography ==
A soldier in the infantry, in May 1936 Pedemonte was appointed governor of the Sahara. After the outbreak of the Civil War, he remained loyal to the Republic and returned to the Republican zone, becoming a military instructor for the new People's Army. He rose to command militias in the central operational zone. Later, in 1937, he was promoted to the rank of lieutenant colonel. At the end of the war, he went into exile from Spain and moved to Cuba, along with other Republican exiles.

During his Cuban period, Pedemonte was a teacher at the Military Civic Institute. Later he also stood out in the field of geography, becoming head of the Cartography Section of the National Institute of Agrarian Reform (INRA).

== Bibliography ==
- Alpert, Michael (2013). El Ejército Republicano en la Guerra Civil (in Spanish). Cambridge University Press. ISBN 978-84-3230-682-2.
- Domingo Cuadriello, Jorge (2009). El exilio republicano español en Cuba (in Spanish). Siglo XXI de España.
- Morillas, Javier (1988). Sahara occidental, desarrollo y subdesarrollo (in Spanish). Prensa y Ediciones Iberoamericanas.
