= Agustín Ganoza y Cavero =

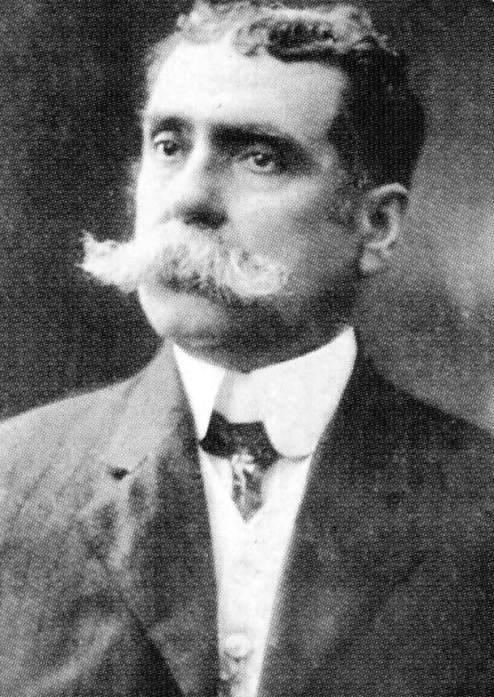

President of the Council of Ministers of Peru
- In office August 31, 1911 – September 24, 1912
- Preceded by: Enrique Basadre Stevenson
- Succeeded by: Elias Malpartida

Minister of Justice, Worship and Education of Peru
- In office August 31, 1911 – September 24, 1912
- President: Augusto B. Leguia
- Preceded by: Antonio Flores Rondón
- Succeeded by: Francisco Moreyra y Riglos

President of the Senate of the Republic of Peru
- In office 1908–1909
- Preceded by: Manuel Barrios
- Succeeded by: Antero Aspillaga

Personal details
- Born: 11 January 1855
- Died: 23 March 1926 (aged 71)

Agustín Guillermo Ganoza y Cavero (11 January 1855 — 23 March 1926) was a Peruvian doctor and politician. He was the mayor of Trujillo from 1886 to 1890, President of the Senate from 1908 to 1909, president of the Council of Ministers and Minister of Justice from 1911 to 1912. Politically educated in civilism, he ended up being a supporter of president Augusto B. Leguia. He occupied the position of Senator of the Republic for 30 consecutive years.
