= Héctor Vargas Haya =

Peruvian politician (1928–2026)

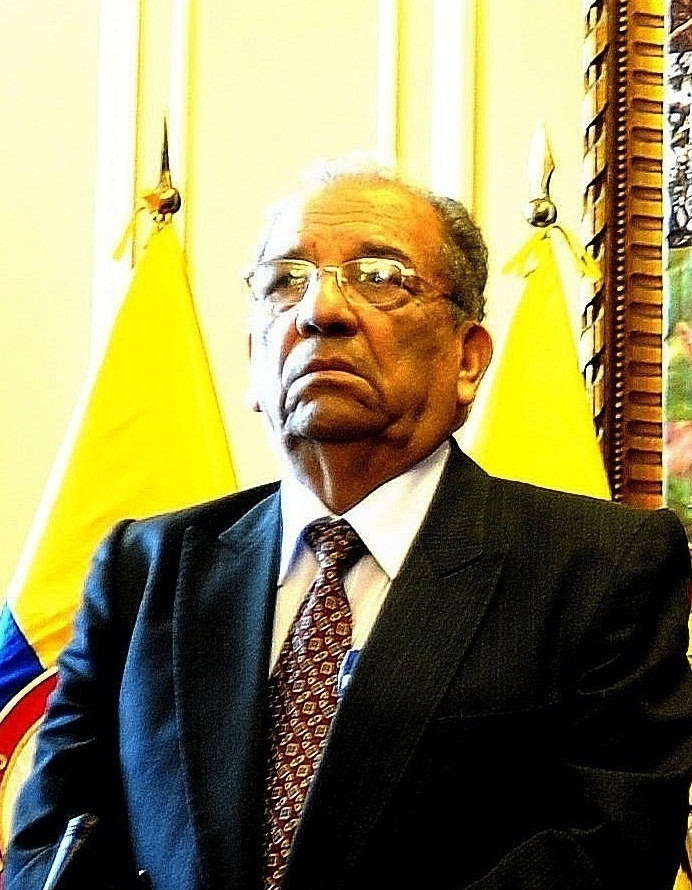
- Vargas in 2010

President of the Chamber of Deputies of Peru
- In office 28 July 1988 – 28 July 1989
- Preceded by: Luis Alva Castro
- Succeeded by: Fernando León de Vivero

Member of the Congress of the Republic of Peru
- In office 27 July 1980 – 26 July 1990
- In office 27 July 1963 – 3 October 1968

Personal details
- Born: 29 March 1928 Rioja, Peru
- Died: 9 April 2026 (aged 98)
- Party: APRA
- Education: National University of San Marcos
- Occupation: Journalist

Héctor Vargas Haya (29 March 1928 – 9 April 2026) was a Peruvian politician. A member of the American Popular Revolutionary Alliance, he served in the Congress of the Republic from 1963 to 1968 and again from 1980 to 1990. From 1988 to 1989, he was President of the Chamber of Deputies.

Vargas died on 9 April 2026, at the age of 98.
