= Luis Leguía =

American cellist and luthier

Luis Grey Leguía (1935 – September 20, 2024) was an American cellist and luthier, known for his 44-year tenure with the Boston Symphony Orchestra and for pioneering the use of carbon fiber for building string instrument.

== Early life and education ==
Leguía was born in 1935 in Los Angeles, California. Raised by his mother, Margaret, a secretary, he spent much of his childhood moving between boarding houses. He began playing the cello at the age of 15. He studied at the École Normale de Musique de Paris and the Juilliard School in New York City, under teachers including Arthur van den Bogaerde, Kurt Reher, André Navarra, Leonard Rose, and Pablo Casals.

== Career ==
After leaving Juilliard, Leguía joined the U.S. Army Band. He later performed with the National Symphony Orchestra, the Houston Symphony (invited by Leopold Stokowski), and the Metropolitan Opera Orchestra. In 1963, he joined the Boston Symphony Orchestra, where he played until his retirement in 2007.

Leguía performed concertos and solo recitals across the U.S., Canada, Europe, South Africa, Lebanon, Ethiopia, Syria, and South America, including 15 solo tours of the latter. He gave masterclasses worldwide and served as chair of the Boston Conservatory cello department for nearly a decade.

He premiered numerous works, including the Boston premiere of Schoenberg’s Cello Concerto, and world premieres of compositions by Robert Parris, Pamela J. Marshall, Vincent Frohne, Robert Evett, Edgar Valcárcel, and Josep Soler.

== Luis and Clark ==
Inspired by the resonant sound of the fiberglass hulls of his Hobie 16 catamaran, he spent eleven years building prototype instruments, first with fiberglass then carbon fiber. In 2000, he co-founded Luis and Clark (a pun on Lewis and Clark) with carbon fiber expert Steve Clark. The company expanded from cellos to violins, violas, and double basses. They are more durable than traditional wooden instruments and can played outdoors, even in inclement weather.

== Death ==
Luis Leguía died on September 15, 2024, at the age of 89.
