= Francisco Xavier de Luna Pizarro =

Peruvian priest and politician (1780–1855)

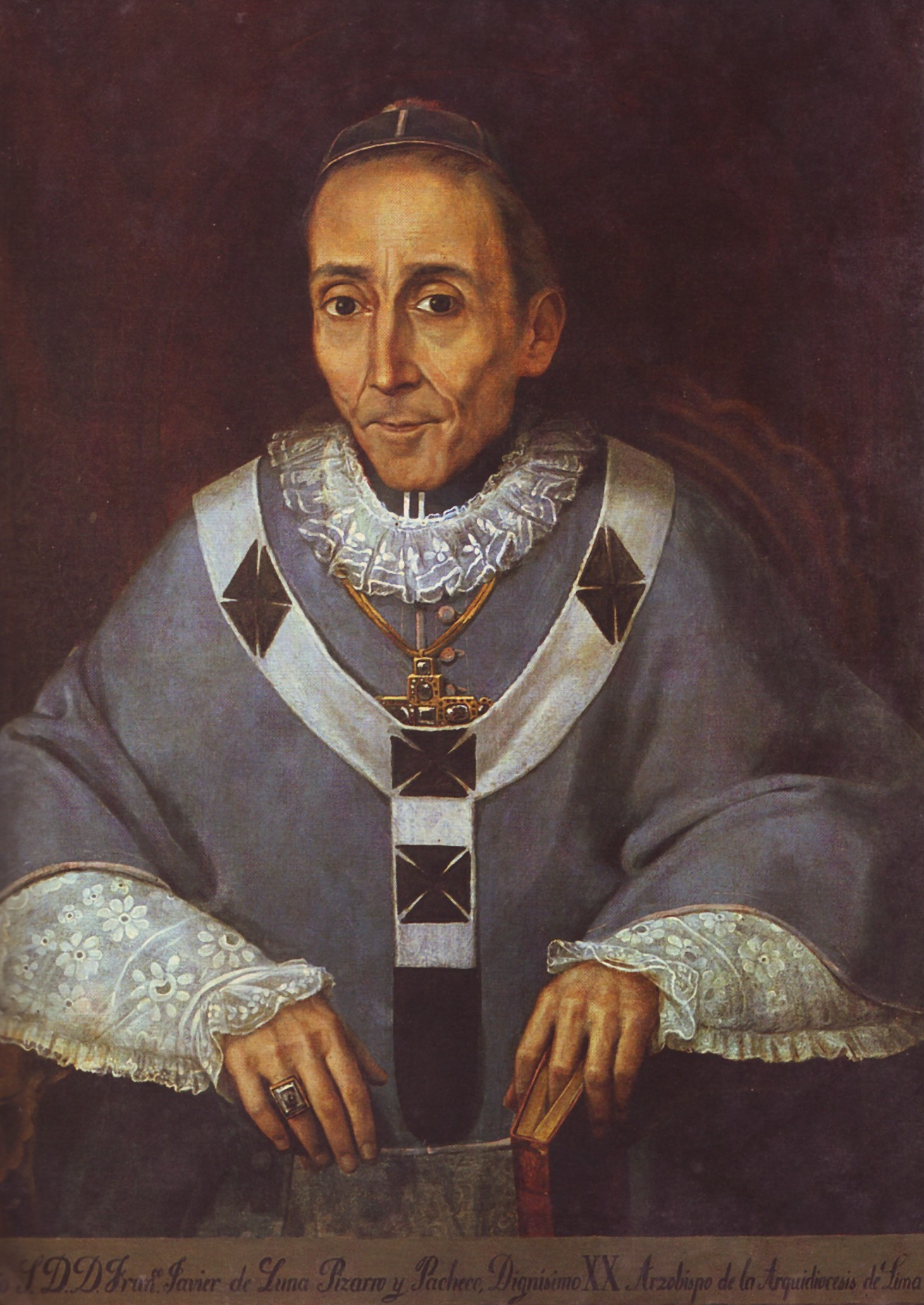

Auxiliary Bishop of Lima
- In office February 1, 1836 – April 24, 1845

20th Archbishop of Lima
- In office April 24, 1845 – February 8, 1855
- Preceded by: Francisco de Sales Arrieta
- Succeeded by: José Manuel Pasquel

Personal details
- Born: November 3, 1780 Arequipa, Viceroyalty of Peru, Spanish Empire
- Died: February 9, 1855 (aged 74) Lima, Peru
- Education: University of Cuzco; University of San Marcos
- Profession: Priest; Archbishop of Lima; President of Peru (interim)
- Church: Catholic Church

Orders
- Ordination: 6 July 1806 by Bartolomé de las Heras
- Consecration: 21 September 1837 by Jorge de Benavente

Francisco Xavier de Luna Pizarro (November 3, 1780 – February 2, 1855) was a Peruvian priest, politician and lawyer. He served as Archbishop of Lima from 1846 to 1855, deputy for Cusco and Arequipa, and President of the Constituent Congresses of 1822, 1828 and 1834.

== Early years and education ==
Educated in his native city and later at the University of Cusco, he taught theology and law at the seminary of Arequipa. He traveled to Spain and witnessed the resistance to the Napoleonic invasion. When he returned to Peru he was named rector of the College of Medicine of San Fernando.

== War of Independence ==
He then participated in the efforts for the independence of Peru and was the president of the first Constituent Congress of 1822, and wrote the constitution of 1823. After José de San Martín renounced as the "Protector of Peru", Luna de Pizarro was chosen as interim president until the investiture of José de la Mar.

He supported the government of La Mar, but after the junta which La Mar presided was dissolved he retired from political life. In 1827 and 1828, he once again became President of the Congress and, in accordance with his functions, he once again was briefly chosen as interim President of Peru in 1833 until the investiture of General Luis José de Orbegoso y Moncada. He then served as the President of the Constituent Congress from December 1833 to March 1834.

In 1846 he was named archbishop of Lima.

== See also ==
- Politics of Peru
