= Elías Malpartida =

Prime Minister of Peru in 1912

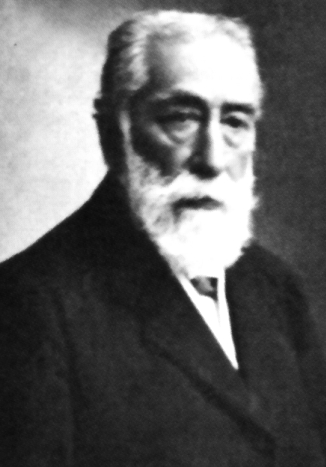
Elías Malpartida

Elías Malpartida Franco (21 July 1844 – 10 August 1922) was a Peruvian politician. He was Minister of Finance in 1883 and in 1895. He was the mayor of Lima from 1914 to 1915 and Prime Minister of Peru from 24 September to 23 December 1912.

Political offices
Preceded by Agustín Guillermo Ganoza Cavero	Prime Minister of Peru; 1912	Succeeded by Enrique Varela Vidaurre
Preceded by Nicanor Carmona	Mayor of Lima; 1914–1915	Succeeded by Nicanor Carmona
