= César Canevaro =

Peruvian politician (1846–1922)

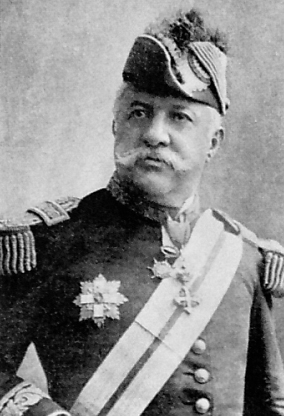
César Canevaro

César Canevaro Valega (January 19, 1846 – October 31, 1922) was a Peruvian General and politician. He fought in the war against Chile, using his own finances and personal relationships to fund the endeavor.

At the end of the war, he became a supporter of General Andrés Avelino Cáceres, whom he supported in his two governments. César Valega was President of the Chamber of Deputies in 1881, President of the Senate from 1894 to 1895, and from 1921 to 1922, Vice President of Peru 1894-1895 and 1919-1922, mayor of Lima (1881, 1886, 1887, 1888, 1889, 1894, 1895) and minister to United States.
