= Roberto Leguía =

Peruvian politician (1866–1930)

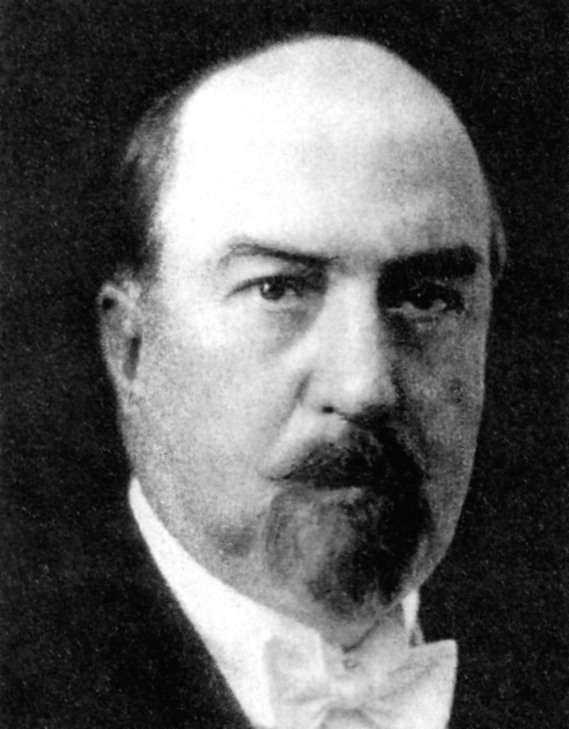

First Vice President of Peru
- In office 1912–1914
- Preceded by: Eugenio Larrabure y Unanue
- Succeeded by: Ricardo Bentín Sánchez

President of the Congress of the Republic of Peru
- In office 1911–1912
- Preceded by: Antonio Miró Quesada de la Guerra
- Succeeded by: Juan de Dios Salazar y Oyarzábal

Personal details
- Born: 1866
- Died: 1930 (aged 63–64)
- Relations: Augusto B. Leguía (Brother)

Roberto Leguía (1866-1930) was the first Vice President of Peru from 1912 to 1914.

== Early life ==
Leguía was born in 1866 in Lambayeque, Peru. His father was Nicanor Leguía y Duarte and mother was María del Carmendo Salcedo. His brother was Augusto B. Leguía, military dictator of Peru. He is a descendant of a Basque immigrant named Estaquio Leguía, who was a tobacco farmer. Leguía also engaged in agriculture in early life.

== Political career ==
Leguía served as President of the Chamber of Deputies from 1911 to 1912. Then he served as first Vice President of Peru from 1912 to 1914. But the swearing-in ceremony for the vice president never took place.

Leguía travelled to Argentina and remained there for 15 years. In his absence, the military coup against president Billinghurst took place. A group of parliamentarians wanted him to be the president, but majority of lawmakers made Oscar Benavides the provisional president. Later he sought refuge at the Italian embassy.

During the dictatorship of his brother, he returned to Peru and served as President of the Senate from 1927 to 1930. He resigned after his brother was overthrown in another military coup.

== Death ==
Leguía died in Lima, Peru in 1930.

== Bibliography ==
- Basadre Grohmann, Jorge: Historia de la República del Perú (1822 - 1933), Volume 12, 13 and 14. Editada por la Empresa Editora El Comercio S. A. Lima, 2005. ISBN 9972-205-74-6 (V.12) - ISBN 9972-205-75-4 (V.13) - ISBN 9972-205-76-2 (V.14)
- Tauro del Pino, Alberto: Enciclopedia Ilustrada del Perú. Third Edition. Volume 9, JAB/LLO. Lima, PEISA, 2001. ISBN 9972-40-158-8
