= Civil Party (Peru) =

Political party in Peru (1871–1930)

Civil Party Partido Civil
- Historical leaders: Manuel Pardo, Mariano Ignacio Prado, Eduardo López de Romaña, Manuel Candamo, Serapio Calderón, José Pardo y Barreda
- Founded: 1871
- Dissolved: 1930
- Headquarters: Club Nacional, Lima
- Newspaper: El Comercio; El Nacional
- Ideology: Liberalism; Conservative liberalism Modernization; Free trade Antimilitarism
- Political position: Centre-right

The Civil Party (Spanish: Partido Civil, PC) was a political party in Peru.

== History ==
Founded as a countermeasure against the growing power of the military in Peru during the first half of the Republic, the party's sole purpose was to establish a civilian rule in the country. This, however, did not prevent them from creating political alliances with the military during its first years of existence. Founded in 1872, the party's first candidate was its founder, Manuel Pardo, who was elected on August 2, 1872.

During the 1870s, economic growth and a certain degree of political stability had laid the conditions for creating the country's first political party. It was also a new era of international trade, business, and finance that Peru was benefiting from. Some believed that this era required the managerial skills that an educated and professional Elite could provide and believed Manuel Pardo was apt for this job. Under Pardo, the Civilistas pursued fiscal and administrative reforms, expanded public education, created the college for the bureaucracy and a school for naval officers, and established a National Guard with merit-based promotion rules.

The Civil Party was first primarily composed of the newly rich merchants, planters, and businesspeople in Peru (especially those who benefited themselves with the Guano Boom exportations). The members of the party believed that the military was corrupt and no longer capable of ruling the country and that it was more apt to serve it militarily than to rule it politically.

After the War of the Pacific and a successful revolution (that removed the military from power once again), the Party played a key role in the reconstruction of the country. Political scientist Luis Schenoni describes the original Civil project of state formation as the clearest casuality of the War of the Pacific, as defeat weakened the national state and empowered peripheral elites. Reviving its antimilitary and pro-export program, they secured the support of its constituents. Most of its members were part of the economic and social elite established in Lima.

Between 1899 and 1920, most Peruvian presidents had been members of this Party. This period of Peruvian history is often called the Aristocratic Republic (coined by Peruvians referring to the social elite that governed them). Elections, however, were restricted, subject to strict property and literacy qualifications, and more often than not manipulated by the incumbent Civil regime.

The party, as a major political force, was disbanded during the so-called oncenio (11 years of power) of Augusto B. Leguía's second term.
