= Aristocratic Republic (Peru) =

Period of the history of Peru, 1895–1919

Peruvian Republic República Peruana
- 1895–1919
- Flag Coat of arms
- Motto: "Firme y feliz por la unión" (Spanish) "Firm and Happy for the Union"
- Anthem: "Himno Nacional del Perú" (Spanish) "National Anthem of Peru" March: "Marcha Nacional Peruana" (Spanish) "National Peruvian March"
- Capital: Lima
- Common languages: Spanish
- Religion: Roman Catholicism
- Demonym: Peruvian
- Government: Unitary presidential republic under an oligarchy
- President
  - 1895–1899 (first): Nicolás de Piérola
  - 1915–1919 (last): José Pardo y Barreda
- Legislature: National Congress
- Historical era: Belle Époque
  - Piérola takes office: 8 September 1895
  - Loreto revolt: 1896
  - Salt Tax Revolt: 1896–1897
  - 1899 elections: 1899
  - 1903 elections: August 1903
  - 1904 elections: 9–12 August 1904
  - 1908 elections: May 1908
  - Unsuccessful coup: 29 May 1909
  - Manuripi conflict: 1910
  - 1912 elections: 25–26 August 1912
  - 1915 elections: 16–17 May 1915
  - Leguía coup: 4 July 1919
  - 1919 elections: 18–19 May 1919
- Currency: Libra de oro Sol (until 1898)
Preceded by	Succeeded by
Peru	Peru

The name of Aristocratic Republic (Spanish: República Aristocrática) is given to the period following the 1895 election of Nicolás de Piérola as President of Peru. This period was characterised by the political dominance of an oligarchy dedicated to agro-exports, mining and finance, through the Civilista Party. The term was coined by historian Jorge Basadre. During this period, the so-called Second Civilism (Spanish: Segundo civilismo) took place, in contrast to that of 1872 to 1876.

The period begins with the rise to power of Nicolás de Piérola, which marks the beginning of a succession of democratically elected governments, until the coup of Augusto B. Leguía in 1919. The only interruption of this succession occurred in 1914 when, due to differences between the Civilista Party and Guillermo Billinghurst, General Óscar R. Benavides carries out a coup d'état to call general elections. It is the second longest period of democratic succession in the republican history of Peru.

== Background and establishment ==
The colonial situation of the country continued after independence, but this time no longer depending on Spain but through dependence on European and North American capital, and it is particularly during the Aristocratic Republic that dependence on North American capital begins to be forged. The Aristocratic Republic is the period of republican history between the years 1899 to 1919 characterised by the succession of governments led by the country's political and economic elite, marked by the alliance between the political and economic elites to govern Peru, eliminating any other type of political proposal that did not come from this consensus.

=== Consensus of political forces ===
It begins with the consensus of two predominant political forces, civilists and democrats, to overthrow Andrés Avelino Cáceres. This was followed by the alliance between Nicolás de Piérola and the civilist oligarchy, who needed a figure with great popular support to be able to pacify the country. Thus, Piérola became their figurehead. He allowed political stability from 1895 to 1899, the year in which he transferred power to the civilistas who took it until 1919, since they had managed to occupy strategic public positions during Piérola's presidency such as the Electoral Apparatus, which allowed them manipulate the elections to allow the defeat of the Democrats. The political consensus between the civilist and democratic parties represented the economic interests of the sugar planters of the coast, the industrialists, the merchants, the land-owning elites of the mountains and others.

=== European crisis ===
This period was also characterised by the economic crisis that hit Europe between 1892 and 1895, which produced a reduction in foreign investments in Peru, as well as an increase in national investments. Which meant that exporters could be ready to export once Europe emerged from the crisis in 1895 and began to demand products such as sugar, wool, cotton, coffee, copper, zinc, and lead. Exporters also benefited from the favorable exchange rate due to having a strong currency. This export boom allowed profits to be reinvested to modernise export plants. It also allowed profits to be reinvested in local manufacturing industries, as wage earners in the export sector had become a large market for the products of these industries.

The lack of imports due to the European crisis meant that investment was also made in the production of parts for the machinery of sugar mills and foundries.

=== Initial reforms ===
The Piérola Government carried out a series of economic and fiscal policies: one of the most important was to place tariff barriers on imported products in such a way as to encourage industrialisation by import substitution. Another measure to encourage trade towards the interior of the country was roads, for which he mobilised the natives of the surrounding communities.

At the tax level, he "eliminated" the Indigenous Tribute in order to leave the Departmental Boards that sympathised with Cáceres, his political enemy, without income. This meant nothing as the Indians were still affected by using the salt tax, which led to peasant protests that were violently repressed, causing many deaths.

=== Exclusion and oppression ===
The other side of the economic boom was exclusion and oppression. Piérola's government was autocratic, “paternalistic,” and not democratic. He opposed the law that allowed those who could not read or write to vote. Since the popular sectors could not vote, and only the wealthy sectors could do so, the continuation of conservative governments was guaranteed. As a consequence, the lower classes would not be integrated into political power and their demands would not be heard.

In addition to this, Piérola continued with Cáceres' policy regarding the landowners of the regions of Peru, joining them to restore the hierarchical relations of authority that had been destroyed during the war and using repression and exclusion if the subordinate classes did not accept it.

The central government depended on the gamonales—the great feudal lords of the Andes—to control the discontent of the peasants. Thus, the representatives of the gamonales who obtained positions for congress in the regional elections supported the central government in exchange for it letting them govern as they wish.

== Beginning of economic dependence ==
=== Mining ===
Mining in the mountains revived after the war, with the boost of silver mining in Casapalca exploited by businessmen in the area since 1880, and continued with the discovery of new mines in Morococha in 1890. But in 1892, two events occur: first, the international fall in the price of silver and then the suspension of the minting of silver coins in the country, caused the profits of silver mining entrepreneurs to fall. Around the same time, the international copper boom began, which some local businessmen began to exploit. Around 1893, the construction of the train to La Oroya was completed, which would make the Morococha and Cerro de Pasco mines more accessible, and would allow North American investments to enter and buy at very high prices most of the mines and even the Casapalca smelter. These North American investments were financially on par with the Peruvian State and far above the Peruvian miners.

The entry of American capital allowed the expansion of mining through the use of new technology, but left this area of the country backward because the profits from this exploitation went to the United States. Furthermore, the Peruvian State did not regulate this sector, which allowed these companies to do things as they liked. As a result of this, Cerro Corporation's internal rate of return was 55%, higher than that of the 3 Chilean copper companies that only reached 35%.

When the mines were exploited by local businessmen, the money from the profits was reinvested in the region in agricultural production and commerce in the region. Even promoting the cultivation of coffee in the Peruvian jungle. When the North Americans arrived, the profits did not return, but despite this there was enough money left to generate production and trade, leading to the creation of a new regional elite in central Peru, made up of miners, landowners and merchants.

=== The landowners and peasants in the Andes ===
The relationship between the landowners and the peasants would be characterised by the enclosure of the communities. Because landowners and businessmen sought to expand their lands to increase their crops, they kept an eye on the possessions of farmers and peasant communities. The latter, which were already weakened by the war as their male population and the amount of crops were reduced, were easy prey for the usurpation of land by the landowners who resorted to coercive collections for debts or forced purchase. The causes of violence began to germinate, as large estates are formed, directed by despotic landowners, and as a result of which many peasants are left without land.

The situation in the southern mountains has a different situation due to the export of wool to the United Kingdom. These exports had doubled between the period of 1885–1895 and 1920, going from 2,624 metric tons of wool to 5,286. There were two types of wool: low-quality wool produced by large-scale landowners, and high-quality wool that came from the altiplano and that were sold to merchants from Arequipa. Thus an economy of production and exchange was formed between peasants, merchants and landowners.

=== Sugar and cotton in the coast ===
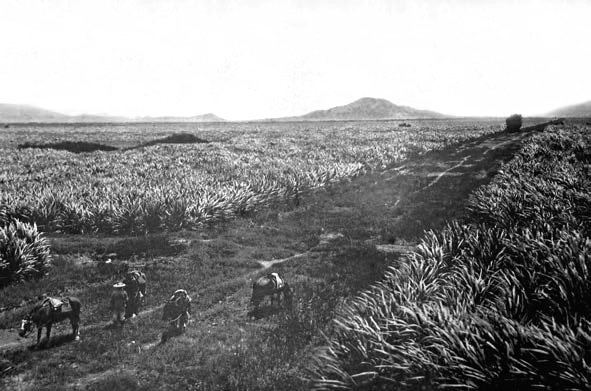
Larco sugar estate.

On the other hand, on the northern coast, sugar was the first Peruvian export product since before the war, the entry of new investors allowed this industry to revive. Of the old landowners, some survived and some sold due to bankruptcy. During this period there were two booms: the first in 1890, in which sales grew by 83%, and the second in 1914 (during the First World War) in which sales grew by 77%.

Likewise, on the central coast, specifically in Ica and Cañete, cotton was produced. This was the second export product. The cotton planters did not have as much political and economic weight as the sugar planters did. On the other hand, this industry benefited both large producers and peasants, since cotton growers gave land in exchange for half of the production and also hired migrants from the mountains to cultivate their best fields, who then returned to their lands and reinvested in their own crops.

=== The rubber boom ===
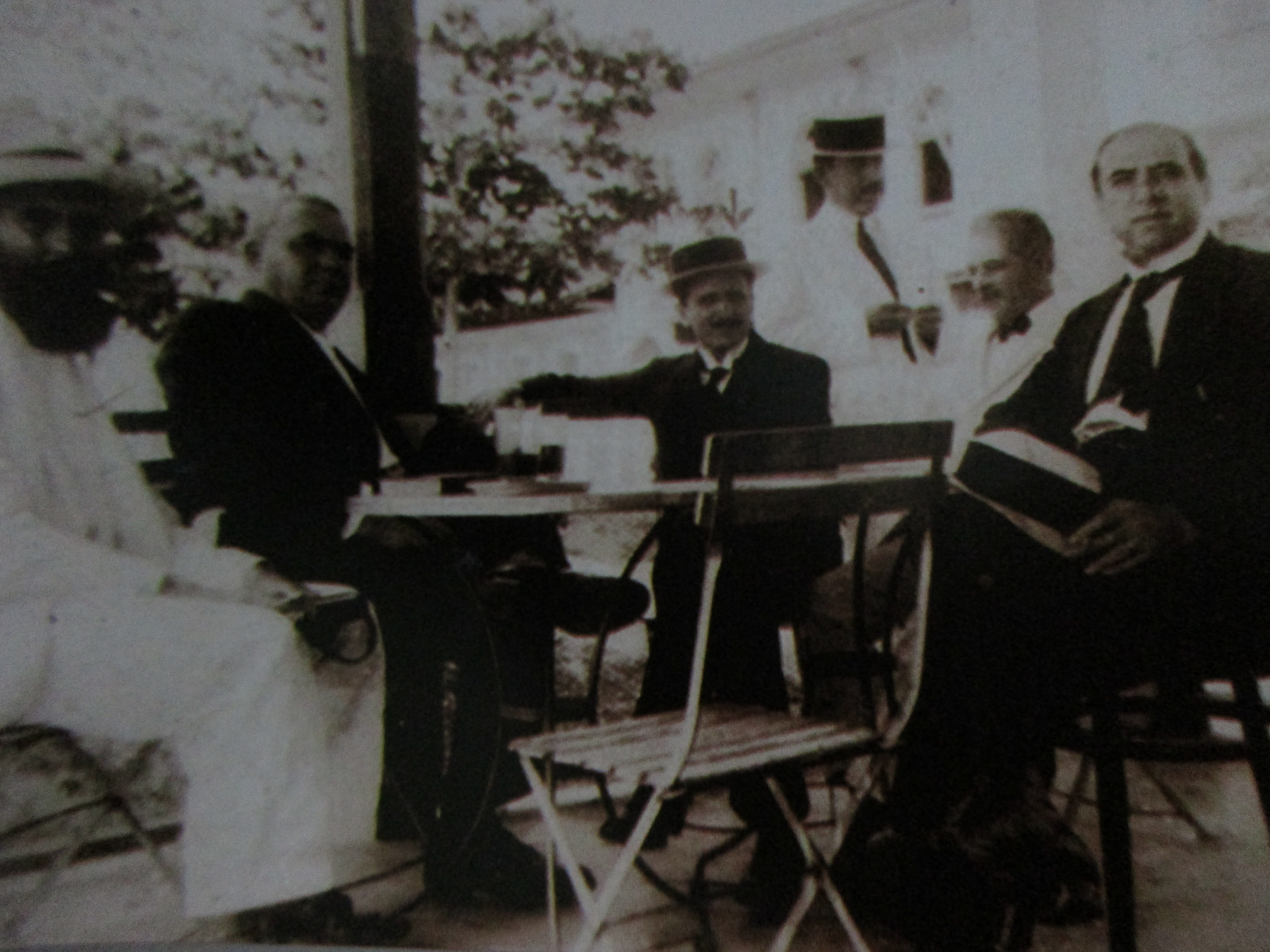
Rubber barons in Iquitos.

The economy in the jungle developed between 1880 and 1920. In 1880, Europe and the United States demanded a high quantity of rubber, so Peru and Brazil became exporters of this product, which came from the collection in the rubber trees that existed and not from any plantation. The extraction was carried out by native Indians who were semi-enslaved, forced to work and who died of malnutrition and disease. This produced an international scandal over the treatment of the natives by the Peruvian Amazon Company between 1908 and 1912. The main "rubber barons" were Carlos Fitzcarrald and Julio César Arana, who used the money from the profits in luxurious imports and to maintain their lifestyles. In 1912, its exports reached 30% of total exports, however the economy of the area did not develop due to the lack of links with the national economy. Finally, in 1915 rubber prices began to fall, because the supply of this product became greater and the more industrialised production of the Far East monopolised the production of this product. Thus in 1920, the rubber boom ended and the Amazon economy stagnated again.

=== Oil as the foreign enclave ===
Once again, primary exploitation was where foreign demand was directed. The oil exploitation that was in the hands of foreign companies was located on the northern coast of Peru, Piura and Tumbes. In 1904, the exploitation of this resource increased due to the increase in national and international demand. Shortly before the First World War, New Jersey's Standard Oil purchased the British-owned oil fields of La Brea y Pariñas. This company is better known in Peru as the International Petroleum Company (IPC). The profits of the IPC were very high and the taxes were scandalously low, since they had enough power to manage the politicians.

=== The dependency position ===
This theory said that underdevelopment is the responsibility of the elite that survived the war with Chile. This elite was made up of a circle of around 30 to 40 wealthy families called the "bourgeoisie" or "plutocracy", who gained control of the State and its resources and used them for their individual and class interests. Firstly, this elite promoted exports but not industrialisation, and also operated in a rentier manner, finally joining the gamonales and foreign capitalists. This elite lacked a "National Project" for development, and only promoted their limited and selfish class interests. That is, they economically subordinated the country and put it at risk, by overspecialising in the production of goods for export controlled by the elite, and by depending excessively on capital and foreign markets.

Jorge Basadre described the Civilista Party, the political expression of this group, as being made up of urban landlords, sugar and cotton producers, famous lawyers, notable doctors, among others, who lived in a world made up of marriages between family groups. Dennis Gilbert said that:

The core of the elite [was] a group: The 24 friends, who met at the National Club to discuss national management. Part of this group were 2 presidents, 8 ministers of economy, the owners of the newspapers, as well as the guano oligarchs.

— Dennis L. Gilbert, La oligarquía peruana: historia de tres familias

=== Ideology of the aristocracy ===
The way of thinking and ideas in this period were marked by the elitist perspective of the government, and by a marked contempt for the popular classes. It was thought that the government should be of an exclusive, powerful, repressive and aristocratic elite, its vision was Europeanising, trying as much as possible to establish parameters of creation, government, education, fashion and lifestyles and mainly English and French linguistic lines. In this way, they felt closer to Europe than to the interior of Peru itself, since they lived in the most exclusive areas of Lima, the centre of contact between Peru and the outside world, with little or no knowledge of the sufferings of their workers. factories, mines and farms on the coast and mountains of the country. Furthermore, this period of history was marked by a contemptuous image towards the Indians of Peru, whom they considered barbarians. In this way, the Peruvian aristocracy lived with its back to the popular and cultural sectors of the country.

=== Political, social and rural conflicts ===
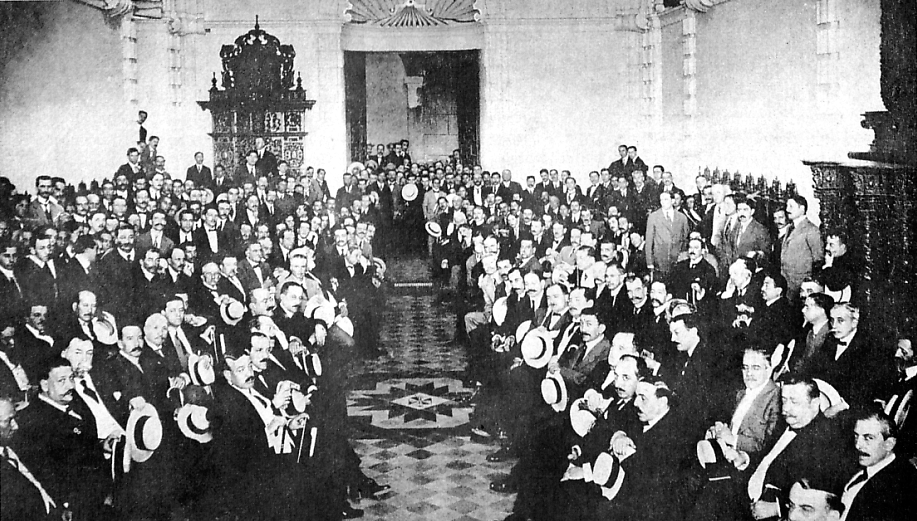
Party convention held in Lima in 1915 to elect a single candidate for the presidential elections of that year.

The aristocratic republic was not entirely stable, as there were power struggles due to individual rivalries and between the different clans. These factions were grouped around the leaders. Within the Civilista Party were Augusto Leguía, Rafael Villanueva Cortez and José Pardo y Barreda. At the Congress there were also groups of followers of Piérola, Leguía and Pardo. This factionalism and power struggles reached its climax with the split of an important part of civilismo when Leguía was in power, leading to the weakening of the Civilista Party.

The working class was not homogeneous; in Peru it was divided by social origin and also by geography. The most organised workers were those who were in Lima and fundamentally those linked to the export sector were those who could obtain improvements to their demands. The mutualism that associated workers for many years gave way to anarchism, which was the way workers used to complain about their low wages and terrible working conditions. With the support of the workers, the first populist president of Peru was elected, who was then overthrown by the elite through the armed forces.

With the start of the First World War, both imports and exports were affected, but once foreign demand restarted, it produced unexpected profits with the rise in product prices. It is in this period that mining and oil spend completely in the hands of a monopoly of foreign companies. And this is when Americans begin to have more preponderance in the country's economy. This era of prosperity caused the elites to dedicate themselves intensely to export based purely on the accumulation of wealth, neglecting the production of national manufactures for domestic consumption, which would be one of the causes of the subsequent worsening of the economic conditions of the workers and of social conflicts.

Due to the disturbances of the war, the uprising of Teodomiro Gutiérrez Cuevas occurred in the southern mountains of Peru, an anarchist who took the name Rumi Maqui, who tried to unite the indigenous people against the exploitation and abuses that the peasants received. of the gamonales and, appealing to an ancestral and messianic image, tried to create certain legislative and educational reforms by electing representatives—who were not of peasant origin—in the towns of the area. The movement was harshly put down and Rumi Maqui fled. The labour and union movements were also encouraged by the Russian Revolution, which promised the emergence of a country where workers would be the masters of their destiny and where they would no longer be exploited.

The appearance of the centenary generation with figures such as José Carlos Mariátegui, Luis Alberto Sánchez, Jorge Basadre, Raúl Porras Barrenechea who through their ideology confronted the pre-existing ideas of the generation of the 1900s. It is in San Marcos where the university reform was promoted in order to be able to elect professors in order to receive training according to the different ideological currents of the time, questioning the traditionalism of university education and the dominance of civilism in that higher education campus.

The strike of 1918–1919 for the 8-hour work day marked a milestone in the social movements of Peru, having achieved this demand for better working conditions with a general mobilization. A direct consequence of this was the strengthening of the union movement, which in 1919 was used by Leguía to come to power, beginning his eleven-year government.

== The twenty-four friends ==
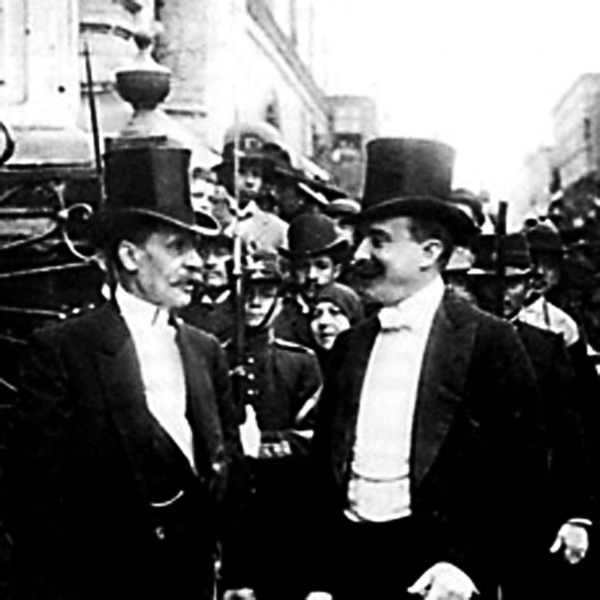
Manuel Candamo and José Pardo y Barreda, two of the oligarchic group known as the "twenty-four friends," who dominated Peru during this period.

One group prevalent in the country's aristocracy was known as the twenty-four friends (Spanish: Los veinticuatro amigos), whose members were affiliated with the Civilista Party. Traditionally it is said that it was founded in a meeting on July 28, 1892. Most of the families that belonged to this group were rentiers, landowners, bankers, businessmen who produced sugar and cotton, newspaper owners, and renowned intellectuals and professionals who belonged to the National Club, where they met weekly on Fridays. The members of the club were:

- Francisco Rosas Balcázar, diplomat and politician, minister during the government of Manuel Pardo y Lavalle
- Luis Carranza: co-director of El Comercio.
- Pedro Correa y Santiago, businessman and politician.
- José Antonio Miró Quesada: director and owner of El Comercio.
- Louis Dubois.
- Narciso de Aramburú.
- Ernest Malinowski, Polish engineer.
- Armando Velez.
- Domingo Olavegoya Yriarte, businessman and landowner.
- Isaac Alzamora, renowned lawyer.
- Luis Felipe Villarán: lawyer and minister during the government of Manuel Candamo.
- Domingo M. Almenara Butler.
- Estanislao Pardo de Figueroa y de Águila: lawyer and politician.
- Pedro D. Gallagher Robertson-Gibbs: mining businessman, banker, president of the Chamber of Commerce.
- Ezequiel Álvarez-Calderón
- Manuel Álvarez-Calderón, businessman.
- Calixto Pfeiffer
- Carlos Ferreyros, politician.
- Enrique Barreda y Osma, businessman and politician.
- Ántero Aspíllaga Barrera, businessman and politician.
- Luis N. Bryce y de Vivero, businessman and politician.
- Alejandro Garland, businessman.
- Leonidas Cárdenas

Other characters that also would make up the select group were:

- Felipe de Osma y Pardo
- Augusto B. Leguía
- Felipe Pardo y Barreda
- Francisco Tudela y Varela
- Antonio Miró Quesada de la Guerra
- José Pardo y Aliaga
- Víctor Manuel Maúrtua

== Heads of state ==
The Aristocratic Republic covers the governments from 1895 to 1919, from the administration of Nicolás de Piérola to the second presidency of José Pardo y Barreda. During this historical period, political and economic power was held in the Civilistas; The Democrats then joined the opposition. The predominance of civilism would last for 24 years.

=== Government of Nicolás de Piérola (1895–1899) ===
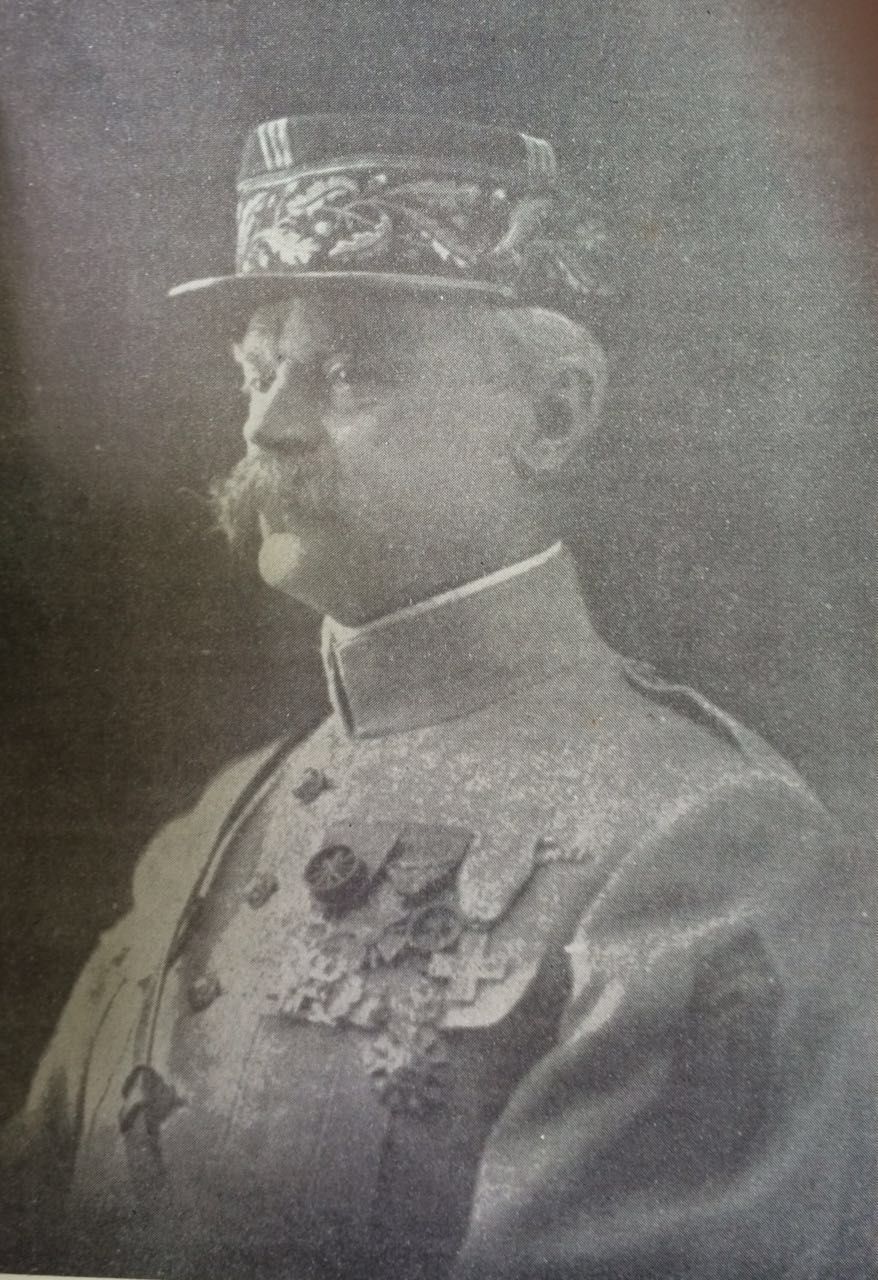
French General Paul Clément was hired to reorganise the Peruvian Army.

On September 8, 1895, Nicolás de Piérola assumed power for the second time, but this time in a constitutional manner (the first had been dictatorial, from 1879 to 1881). He formed a broad-based government, as he called upon representative elements of national politics to collaborate with him, among whom were many members of the Civilista Party.

Under his government, the Tax Collection Society (Spanish: Sociedad Recaudadora de Impuestos) was created for the better collection of State income, which was popularly known as "La recolectora" (The collector). Great support was given to the founding of credit and financial institutions of foreign capital, creating several banks (Banco del Perú y Londres, Banco Popular del Perú, Banco Internacional del Perú). The tax on essential products (food) was reduced and those for pleasure or vice (alcohol and tobacco) were increased, and the gold standard was implemented in the monetary system, issuing the Gold Pound, with the same weight and grade as the pound sterling.

The Ministry of Public Works and Development was created to organise a public works plan and promote industrial development (1896). Its prime minister was the engineer Eduardo López de Romaña, who later succeeded Piérola as president. It stimulated explorations in the Amazon, with the desired purpose of opening communication routes between the coast and the jungle. It was at this time when the economic boom of the Peruvian jungle began, with the exploitation of rubber. The importance that the Amazon reached then is denoted when Manuel Madueño attempted to create a federated state in Loreto, known as the Federal State of Loreto.

A notable measure taken by the government due to the Chilean–Peruvian territorial dispute was the monopoly claimed by the government on the salt trade, imposing a tax burden, with the funds destined to the reacquisition of Tacna and Arica, then controlled by Chile (1896). In response, residents of Huanta revolted against the tax, which was savagely repressed (1896-1897). In 1898, the Billinghurst–La Torre Treaty was signed to establish the regulatory procedure to follow in the planned holding of the plebiscite in Tacna and Arica. This would never come to fruition, due to a unilateral decision by Chile, which, starting in 1901, accentuated its heartless policy of Chileanisation in said Peruvian provinces.

Other landmarks of Piérola's presidency were the reorganisation of the Peruvian Army, which was undertaken under the guidance of a French military mission hired for that purpose, chaired by Colonel Paul Clément. Additionally, the Chorrillos Military School was founded and compulsory military service was established.

Additionally, the inventions of the Second Industrial Revolution arrived to Peru: the first phonograph (1896); the first cinematograph (1897), whose inaugural function was given with the presence of Piérola; Röntgen rays (1896); the first automobiles (1898); and the number of telephone lines were increased.

=== Government of Eduardo López de Romaña (1899–1903) ===
Under Eduardo López de Romaña, he promulgated the water, mining and commercial codes, also developing agriculture, mining and industry. The National School of Agriculture was founded to promote agrarian development. Additionally a series of explorations of the Peruvian Amazon began.

Other notable events include:

- In Lima, the first union groups were established.
- In 1901, diplomatic relations with Chile were broken due to the hostility to Peruvians in Arica and Tacna. These would resume in 1905, only to be severed again in 1908.
- The American Cerro de Pasco Mining Company (later called the Cerro de Pasco Copper Corporation) was established to exploit the mines of the central mountain range.
- The Osma–Villazón Treaty was signed with Bolivia.

=== Government of Manuel Candamo (1903–1904) ===
Manuel Candamo, leader of the Civilista Party and wealthy businessman, was elected with an overwhelming majority, due in part to the Democratic Party's refusal to present a candidate for president. He began an energetic railway policy, presenting to the Senate a project for the study and construction of railways in different parts of the country. In 1904, the first transurban electric railway called "La Oroya" was inaugurated, whose route was Lima–Chorrillos.

He died 8 months after assuming his mandate, victim of an illness, being replaced by Vice President Serapio Calderón, who called elections. These elections put the Constitutionalist-allied Pardo against Piérola, the latter representing the democrat-liberal alliance. Shortly before the elections, however, Piérola renounced his candidacy, citing a lack of guarantees.

=== First Government of José Pardo (1904–1908) ===
José Pardo y Barreda won the elections unopposed with Piérola's resignation. Under his government, the following measures took place:

- The deposit and consignment fund was created, currently the Banco de la Nación.
- A radical reform of public education was carried out. He decreed free and compulsory primary education under the responsibility of the central government, sd until then it had been in the hands of the municipalities.
- Education was greatly encouraged with the creation of institutions such as the Normal School for Men and the School of Arts and Crafts.
- The labour regulations and legislation were ordered to be drawn up by José Matías Manzanilla.
- The construction of some railways began, such as the line from Sicuani to Cuzco and the one from La Oroya to Huancayo.
- Women were allowed to enter university.
- He was concerned about national defence, strengthening the navy with the acquisition of two cruisers: Almirante Grau and Coronel Bolognesi.
- His most prominent minister was that of Treasury, Augusto B. Leguía.

=== Government of Augusto Leguía (1908–1912) ===
Augusto B. Leguía was the official candidate for the presidency in 1908 and did not have any serious rivals, since Piérola, once again, abstained from presenting his candidacy. Because of this, Leguía easily won. During his presidency, the Civilista Party was divided between those loyal to Pardo and the followers of Leguía.

During his presidency, border problems with neighbouring countries worsened, such as in the confrontation with Colombia and the tension with Ecuador. Additionally, a diplomatic incident occurred with Chile in 1908, known as the "crown incident" (Spanish: Incidente de la corona). The Chilean minister in Peru wanted to present a bronze crown during the inauguration of the Crypt of the Heroes, dedicated to the dead of the War of the Pacific. The Peruvian Foreign Minister Melitón Porras Osores rejected that offer, because in his opinion, it did not correspond to the true feelings of the Chilean government, which continued its policy of Chileanisation in Tacna and Arica. The Chilean minister retired to his country offended. In contrast, the Polo–Bustamante Treaty was signed with Bolivia and the Velarde–Río Branco Treaty was signed with Brazil, thus definitively settling the borders with both countries.

On May 29, 1909, a group of Pierolistas kidnapped Leguía and unsuccessfully tried to make him sign his resignation in Plaza Bolívar. The events were violently put down by the Army, who detained the conspirators, which included Piérola's relatives.

Other measures of his government include:

- Sugar and cotton production was boosted.
- Support was given to settlers to exploit rubber in the Amazon, which saw a boom.
- Law No. 1378 on work accidents was approved, one of the 10 laws of the Manzanilla project.
- Creation of the National Conservatory of Music.
- The Guano administration company was created (1909)

=== Government of Guillermo Billinghurst (1912–1914) ===
Guillermo Billinghurst was a former mayor of Lima. His candidacy for the presidency, presented at the last minute, had the support of the popular classes. He was nicknamed "Big Bread" (Spanish: Pan grande) because of his campaign for cheaper food. He faced the official candidate Ántero Aspíllaga. During the election campaign, Billinghurst demanded that the elections be annulled and that the election of the president be transferred to Congress. Supported by the masses, his request was accepted by Congress, which elected him president. However, he lacked a majority in Congress, because it was renewed every two years by thirds. He therefore found a civilist and pro-Leguía majority in parliament that was very hostile to him.

During his government, the following events took place:

- He claimed workers' rights, which attracted the animosity of the oligarchy. The working class was thus encouraged to make their demands, through a series of strikes.
- He established 8 hours of work for the workers at the Callao dock.
- Given the announced opening of the Panama Canal to maritime trade, a policy was undertaken to improve port services, especially in Callao.
- The Religion course was implemented in colleges and normal schools.
- Foundation of the School of Domestic Education, aimed at the preparation of women of limited economic means.
- The Lima Drinking Water Company passed under the direct administration of the State.
- Death of Nicolás de Piérola, on June 23, 1913.
- He attempted to dissolve Congress, a fact that accelerated his fall through a coup d'état.
- Machu Picchu was discovered by the American explorer and politician Hiram Bingham III.

=== Government of Óscar Benavides (1914–1915) ===
Óscar R. Benavides came to power through a military coup d'état. He headed a Government Junta and was later named Provisional President by Congress. He developed a brief government with which he returned power to the civilist oligarchy.

During his government, the following events took place:

- A rebellion broke out in Puno, led by Rumi Maqui due to the exploitation of local peasants.
- The First World War began, which would have serious effects on the economy.
- A convention of political parties was called to designate a unification candidacy with a view to the 1915 elections. The Civil, Constitutional and Liberal parties participated, while the Democratic Party abstained from participating. The designated candidate was José Pardo, former president and leader of the civilismo, who widely defeated the democratic candidate Carlos de Piérola.

=== Second Government of José Pardo (1915–1919) ===
José Pardo y Barreda was again elected President of Peru, with this second presidency being known as the Civilist Renaissance (Spanish: Renacimiento Civilista).

This government had to face the consequences of the First World War in the economic aspect. With the threat of a sudden economic paralysis, the "fiscal bills" were issued. The war caused an increase in exports by up to 300%, for the benefit of agro-exporters and mining companies. There was a shortage of food, since many farmers preferred to grow cotton for export and not food, generating shortages and increasing prices of these products. Public services (water, electricity, sewage, telephone) and national banking experienced unprecedented expansive growth. Proof is that Lima was then the only Latin American capital whose services were entirely national.

The workers demanded, through strikes and stoppages, for the lowering of subsistence prices, the implementation of the 8-hour day and other labour demands. On January 15, 1919, a decree was issued that established 8 hours of work, in order to stop the workers' struggle. Despite this achievement, the labour movement continued its fight, this time against the rising cost of living, being severely repressed by the government (as occurred with the great strike from May 27 to June 2, 1919).

On December 26, 1918, the Congress of Peru approved a law that authorised the State to submit the matter of La Brea y Pariñas to international arbitration. Regarding relations with neighboring countries, consular relations with Chile were broken, in protest against the excesses committed by this country in its policy of Chileanisation of Tacna and Arica (1918). In this way, the break with Chile was total, since there had been no diplomatic relations between both countries for several years.

Freedom of religion was established, and the respective constitutional reform was carried out (November 11, 1915).

This was the last government of the so-called Aristocratic Republic before the coup d'état of 1919, where Augusto B. Leguía began his 11-year presidency.

== See also ==
- National Reconstruction (Peru)
- Amazon rubber cycle
- Centralism (Peru)

== Bibliography ==
- Basadre, Jorge (2005). Historia de la República del Perú (1822–1933) (9th ed.). Lima: Empresa Editora El Comercio S. A. ISBN 9972-205-74-6.
- Contreras, Carlos; Cueto, Marcos (2013). Historia del Perú contemporáneo (in Spanish) (5th ed.). Lima: Instituto de Estudios Peruanos.
- Rivera Serna, Raúl (1975). Historia del Perú. República 1822-1968 (in Spanish) (2nd ed.). Lima: Editorial Jurídica.
- Guerra, Margarita (1984). Historia General del Perú. Vol. 11: La República Aristocrática (1st ed.). Lima: Editorial Milla Batres. pp. es.
