= Enrique López Albújar =

Peruvian writer

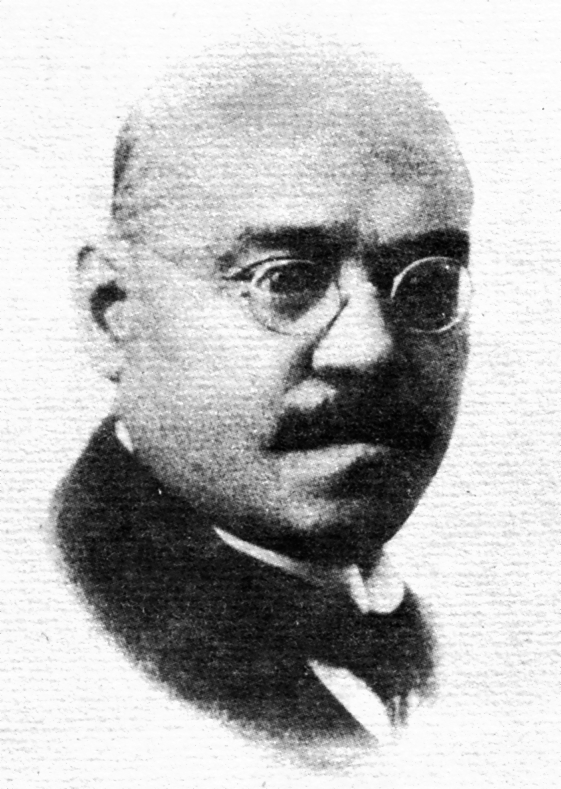
Enrique López Albújar

Enrique López Albújar (November 23, 1872 Chiclayo – March 6, 1966, Lima) was a Peruvian writer who focused mainly on poetry.

== Biography ==
Enrique López Albújar was the son of Manuel López Vilela and Manuela Albújar Bravo, both of Piuran ancestry. He was of Spanish, Indigenous and African ancestry. He was born at the Pátapo estate near Chiclayo, where his father worked. He spent his childhood in Piura and Morropón, and throughout his life considered himself a Piuran.

He received his primary education at several schools in Piura and his secondary education in Lima, first at the Liceo Preparatorio Marticorena (1886–1888) and later at the College of Our Lady of Guadalupe (1889–1890).

He entered the National University of San Marcos, where he studied law. At the same time, he became involved in politics and journalism, writing against the military influence in Peruvian politics during the 1890s, including the governments of Remigio Morales Bermúdez and Andrés A. Cáceres. Together with José Santos Chocano and Mariano H. Cornejo, he edited the weekly newspaper La Cachiporra. He also contributed to La Tunda, published by Belisario Barriga, where he published verses criticizing General Cáceres, resulting in a trial from which he was acquitted in 1893. Further political poems led to his imprisonment between October and November 1894. He was released through his father's influence. The following year, he published his first literary work, Miniaturas, a collection of poems written in collaboration with Aurelio Arnao. The book consisted of short portraits of women from Lima's upper class accompanied by their photographs (1895).

Influenced by the ideas of Manuel González Prada, López Albújar developed an interest in Indigenous issues and opposed caciquismo and feudalism. In 1898, he submitted a university thesis on La injusticia de la propiedad del suelo ("The Injustice of Land Ownership"), which was rejected as subversive. He eventually graduated with a bachelor's degree in law after submitting the thesis ¿Debe o no reformarse el artículo 4º de la Constitución? ("Should Article 4 of the Constitution Be Reformed?") in 1900.

He returned to Piura, where he qualified as a lawyer before the Superior Court of Justice in 1901. He joined the Liberal Party of Augusto Durand and founded its local committee in Piura in 1904. From 1904 to 1908, he edited the weekly El Amigo del Pueblo, campaigning against gamonalismo (large-estate landholding). In response, the prefect of Piura, Germán Leguía y Martínez, founded the conservative newspaper El Sol in 1905. López Albújar remained a member of the Liberal Party until 1911.

Between 1911 and 1913, he served intermittently as an acting judge in Piura and Tumbes. In 1916, he represented striking workers from Talara and Negritos as a lawyer. During this period he contributed to several Piuran newspapers, publishing short stories that were later collected posthumously. He also taught history at the National College of San Miguel in Piura.

In July 1916, Augusto Durand invited him to Lima to serve as editor-in-chief of the newspaper La Prensa. After six months, he requested a judicial position from President José Pardo y Barreda, which was granted. He subsequently devoted himself permanently to the judiciary.

He served as a judge of first instance in Huánuco from 1917 to 1923 and in Piura from 1923 to 1928. His experiences as a judge in Huánuco inspired Cuentos andinos, which he wrote during a three-month suspension from his judicial position following a ruling in which he acquitted a man and woman accused of double adultery, arguing that love should be free. The book was published in 1920 and received a second edition in 1924, marking the beginning of a new form of Indigenismo distinct from that of the 19th century.

He later served as a member of the Superior Court of Lambayeque from 1928 to 1931 and of the Superior Court of Tacna from 1931 to 1947, when he retired. During this period he continued publishing works including De mi casona (1924), Matalaché (1928), and Nuevos cuentos andinos (1937).

He received the National Novel Prize, the Medal of Congress, and an honorary doctorate from the University of San Marcos, among other distinctions. He died in Lima in 1966 at the age of 93.

== Sources ==
- Basadre Grohmann, Jorge (2005). Historia de la República del Perú (1822-1933). Vol. 16 (9th ed.). Lima: Empresa Editora El Comercio S. A. ISBN 9972-205-78-9.
- Sánchez, Luis Alberto (1975). La literatura peruana: Derrotero para una Historia Cultural del Perú. Vol. 4 (4th ed.). Lima: P.L. Villanueva, Editor.
