= 1915 Peruvian presidential election =

- 16–17 May 1915
- Presidential election
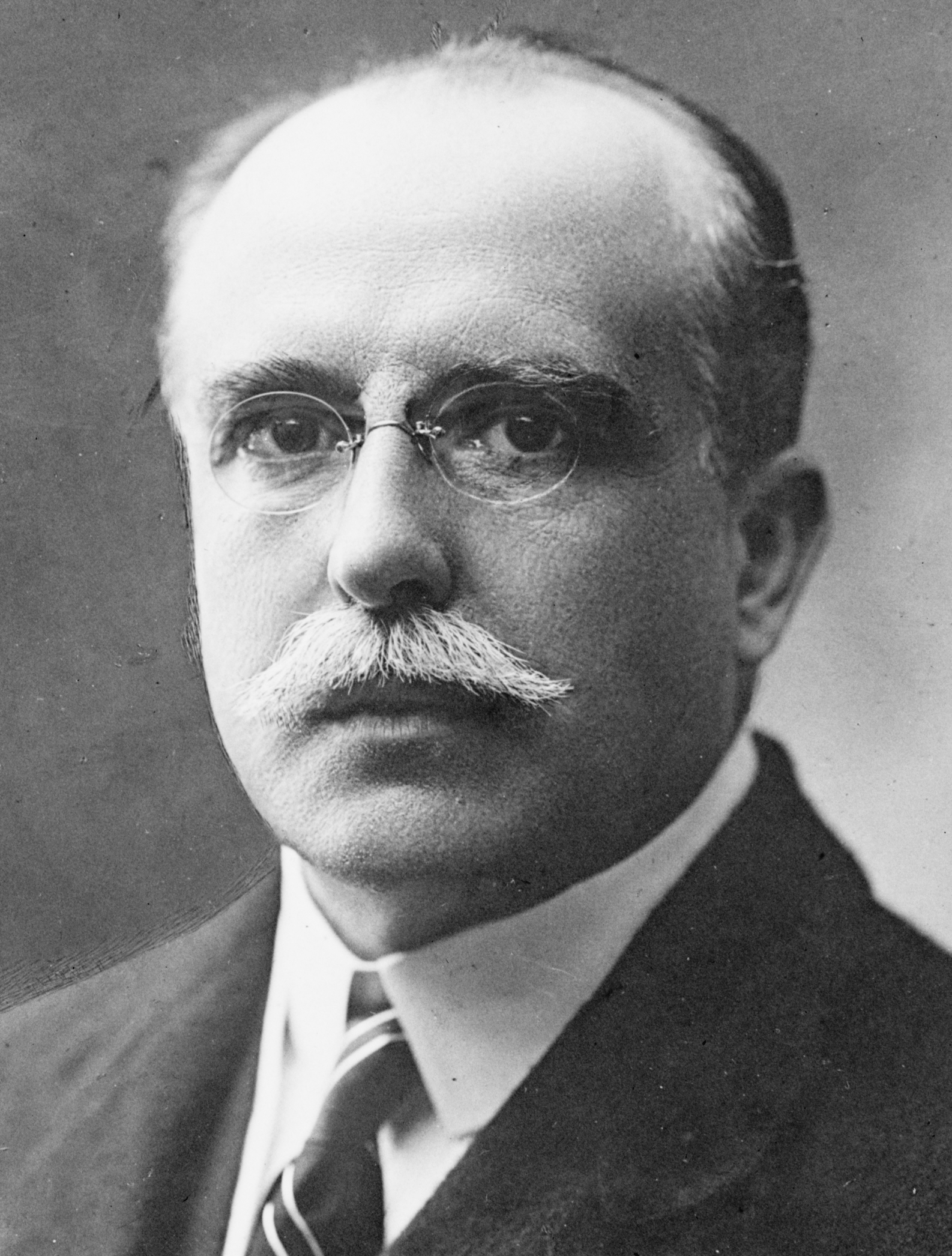

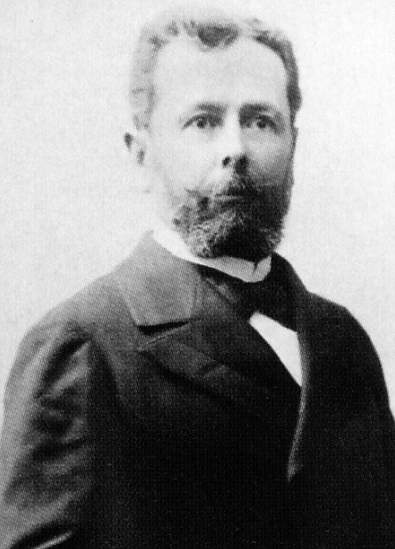
Candidate	José Pardo y Barreda	Carlos de Piérola
Party	Civilista Party	Democratic
Popular vote	131,289	13,151
Percentage	90.90%	9.10%
President before election
Óscar R. Benavides
Military
Elected President
José Pardo y Barreda
Civilista Party

Presidential elections were held in Peru on 16 and 17 May 1915. They followed a coup in January 1914 that overthrew the government of Guillermo Billinghurst.

José Pardo y Barreda of the Civilista Party was elected president with 91% of the vote. Ricardo Bentín Sánchez was elected first vice president and Melitón Carvajal second vice president.

== Background ==
A new electoral law was approved in February, which abolished the previous electoral register.

Coup leader Óscar R. Benavides hoped to avoid a repeat of the highly partisan politics that preceded the coup and called for parties to work together. As a result, in March 1915 the Civilista Party, Constitutional Party and Liberal Party held a joint convention, with 418 members in attendance. The parties agreed to support a common presidential candidate, selecting former president José Pardo y Barreda on 28 March. On 25 April the convention selected Ricardo Bentín Sánchez and Melitón Carvajal as candidates for the vice presidencies.

== Results ==
=== President ===
Candidate	Party	Votes	%
José Pardo y Barreda	Civilista Party	131,289	90.90
Carlos de Piérola	Democratic Party	13,151	9.10
Total		144,440	100.00
Total votes		144,712	–
Source: Basadre

=== First vice president ===
Candidate	Votes	%
Ricardo Bentín Sánchez	127,459	
Total		
Total votes	146,523	–
Source: Basadre

=== Second vice president ===
Candidate	Votes	%
Melitón Carvajal	134,077	
Total		
Total votes	146,237	–
Source: Basadre
