= Gerardo Álvarez Castillo =

Peruvian general

Gerardo Álvarez
- Álvarez in 1920
- Born: 1864; Cuzco, Peru
- Died: 1940 (aged 75–76)

Gerardo Álvarez Castillo (1864 – 1940) was a Peruvian military officer and politician who held the rank of brigadier general. He played a leading role in the July 4th Peruvian coup d'état, deposing president José Pardo and restoring former president Augusto B. Leguía back to power. Álvarez subsequently served various positions, including Minister of War and Navy (1919 – 1920), prefect of Loreto (1921 – 1922) and senator for Tumbes (1924 – 1930).

== Early life ==
In 1864, Álvarez was born in Cuzco, to Juan C. Álvarez and María Dolores Castilla. While there, he attended school at the Colegio Nacional.

== Military career ==
=== War of the Pacific ===
At the outbreak of the War of the Pacific in 1879, he enlisted in the army at 15 years old and joined the 'Granaderos del Cuzco' (Grenadiers of Cuzco) battalion. He participated in the campaign against Chile, including the battle of Los Ángeles. He was promoted several times during the war and held the rank of captain by its conclusion.

=== Civil wars ===
In August 1884, a few months after the peace which ended the war with Chile was signed, Álvarez sided with the conservative forces of Andrés A. Cáceres who revolted against the government of Miguel Iglesias—both of whom were rivals. After the revolution broke out, Álvarez participated in the battles of Masura, Canta, Huaripampa, Santa Clara, San Bartolomé, and in the capture of Lima.

When Andrés Avelino Cáceres revolted against Nicolás de Piérola, Álvarez remained loyal to Cáceres. He participated in the battles of Cañete, Yauyos, and for the streets of Lima in March.

== Political career ==
Alvarez as a Lieutenant Colonel

In 1907, the congress of Peru promoted him to the rank of colonel, and during the second rule of José Pardo y Barreda, he was assigned Chief of General Staff of the Army.

=== 1919 coup d'état ===
On May 18, 1919, candidate Augusto B. Leguía won the 1919 presidential elections, but the Supreme Court annulled around 15,000 votes attributed to him, raising suspicion that Congress would reject his victory. Fearing that the elections would eventually be annulled, in the early hours of July 4th, 1919, Álvarez, a supporter of Leguía, seized the government palace with support of Gendarmerie forces, imprisoning President José Pardo y Barreda and installing Augusto B. Leguía as president.

=== Political positions ===
After the coup, Augusto B. Leguía appointed him Chief of Staff, and later Minister of War and Navy with the resignation of José Roman Pizarro. Álvarez later became prefect of Loreto in 1921 and senator of Tumbes in 1924.

== Death ==
Álvarez died in the year of 1940.
