= 1914 Peruvian coup d'état =

1914 coup d'état in Peru

- Part of the Aristocratic Republic
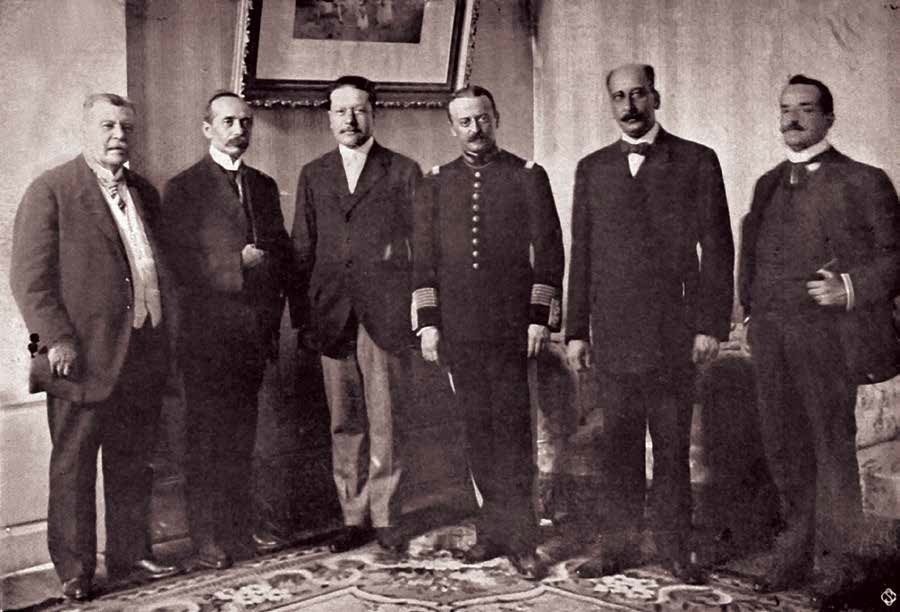
- The Military Junta of 1914
Date	4 February 1914
Location	Government Palace, Lima
Result	Military victory: Overthrow of Guillermo Billinghurst; Execution of Enrique Varela Vidaurre; Óscar Benavides becomes president

Belligerents
Government of Peru	Peruvian Army

Commanders and leaders
Guillermo Billinghurst	Óscar R. Benavides

The 1914 Peruvian coup d'état took place on February 4, 1914, headed by Colonel Óscar R. Benavides, who a day earlier was removed from his position as chief of the Army General Staff. The coup was aimed at preventing Guillermo Billinghurst's government from dissolving the Peruvian Congress, which opposed him. It was the first successful coup d'état of the 20th century in Peru.

== Overview ==
Guillermo Billinghurst's government was marked by a progressive confrontation with the Congress of the Republic, dominated by the opposition. The continuous labour reforms implemented by his populist government, such as the approval of the eight-hour day, created a climate of tension between political elites and businessmen. The first serious confrontation occurred in October 1913 when Billinghurst refused to call an Extraordinary Legislature so that Congress could approve the Budget Law, as it was required to do. Billinghurst approved this law by decree, thus usurping a constitutional power of Congress.

As Congress continued to be adverse, Billinghurst decided to dissolve it and then hold a plebiscitary consultation to reform the Constitution. His idea was to make the election of the President and the members of Parliament coincide, so that the former could have a congressional majority, in order to facilitate the work of the Executive. He also sought a reform of the electoral process, incorporating the Supreme Court, which was at that time a very prestigious institution. The inspiration for these advanced plans was the talented lawyer Mariano H. Cornejo.

The conflict between Billinghurst and Congress thus reached its highest point. Armed groups of the people hailed the President at night; It was even said that he had planned to arm the Billinghurist artisans and workers, in order to have a shock force ready to carry out his purposes.

To maintain constitutional formality, a group of congressmen, meeting at the house of deputy Arturo Osores, agreed to declare the vacancy of the Presidency of the Republic due to the moral incapacity of its holder (invoking an article of the 1860 Constitution), as well as to launch a Manifesto to the Nation expressing the rejection of the systematic attacks on the Constitution committed by Billinghurst and calling on the people to unite in the defense of constitutionality and legality. That document was signed by more than 80 congressmen. In addition to Osores, the conspiracy against the government included the journalist Alberto Ulloa Cisneros, director of the newspaper La Prensa, who was opposed to the government; the Montonero Augusto Durand; and the brothers Javier, Jorge and Manuel Prado Ugarteche. To ensure the effectiveness of the measure they were going to take, the conspirators initiated contacts with the military leaders, reaching an understanding with the Chief of the Army Staff, Colonel Óscar R. Benavides.

The conspiring parliamentarians furtively discussed when would be the opportune time to declare the presidential vacancy: before or after Billinghurst decreed the dissolution of Congress. While in this, a denunciation occurred from an army officer, who informed Billinghurst of the plot, thus beginning the government repression on February 2, 1914. Several opposition politicians and deputies were arrested, La Prensa was closed, Benavides was removed from his position as chief of staff, and the popular militias were armed to defend the government. All of which precipitated the events, when the armed forces intervened in defence of Congress.

In the early morning of February 4, 1914, the Lima garrison started the coup under the direction of Colonel Benavides. The Government Palace was attacked, and the presidential guard was reduced after a bloody confrontation. Billinghurst was taken prisoner, forced to resign and then deported to Iquique. Meanwhile, the Minister of War, General Enrique Varela Vidaurre, was murdered, shot while he slept in the Santa Catalina barracks.

Once Billinghurst was overthrown, a Government Junta chaired by Benavides was formed with the consent of Congress. A few months later, Congress elected Benavides as Provisional President.

The coup d'état broke the continuity of twenty years of civil governments, returning power to the oligarchy. Benavides met a convention of the Civil, Constitutional and Liberal parties that chose former president José Pardo y Barreda, leader of the civilistas, as a consensus candidate for early elections. Opposite his popular candidacy was that of Carlos de Piérola, for the Democratic Party. After the elections were held in 1915, Pardo won the elections with 131,289 votes compared to 13,151 for his opponent, governing until 1919.

== See also ==
- Aristocratic Republic (Peru)

== Bibliography ==
- Basadre, Jorge (2005). Historia de la República del Perú (1822–1933) (9th ed.). Lima: Empresa Editora El Comercio S. A. ISBN 9972-205-74-6.
- Chirinos, Enrique (1985). Historia de la República. Vol. 1. De San Martín a Leguía (1821-1930) (3rd ed.). Lima: AFA Editores Importadores S.A.
- Orrego, Juan Luis (2000). Historia del Perú: La República Oligárquica (1850-1950) (1st ed.). Lima: Lexus Editores. ISBN 9972-625-35-4.
- Luna, Pablo F. (1989-12-16). "1914. Sociedad y parlamento: reflexiones en torno a una crisis". Apuntes. Revista de ciencias sociales (24): 179–198. doi:10.21678/apuntes.24.291. hdl:11354/770. ISSN 2223-1757.
