= 1904 Peruvian presidential election =

- 1904
- Turnout: 66.48% (▲0.97pp)
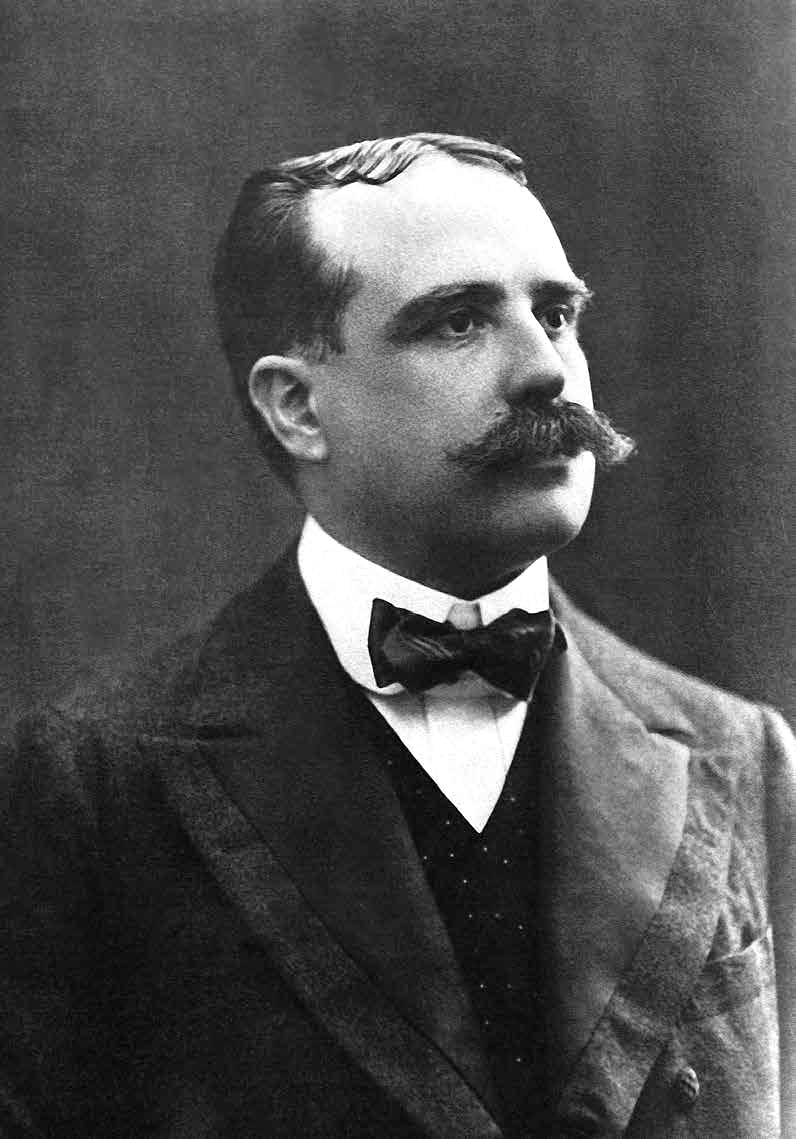
Candidate	José Pardo y Barreda
Party	Civilista Party
Popular vote	96,430
Percentage	100%
President before election
Serapio Calderón
Civilista Party
Elected President
José Pardo y Barreda
Civilista Party

Presidential elections were held in Peru in 1904. José Pardo y Barreda of the Civilista Party was elected unopposed.

== Results ==
Candidate	Party	Votes	%
José Pardo y Barreda	Civilista Party	96,430	100.00
Total		96,430	100.00
Valid votes		96,430	98.68
Invalid/blank votes		1,289	1.32
Total votes		97,719	100.00
Registered voters/turnout		146,990	66.48
Source: Tuesta
