= Museum of Elections and Democracy =

Museum in Peru

Coordinates: 12.0526°S 77.0334°W

- Museo Electoral y de la Democracia
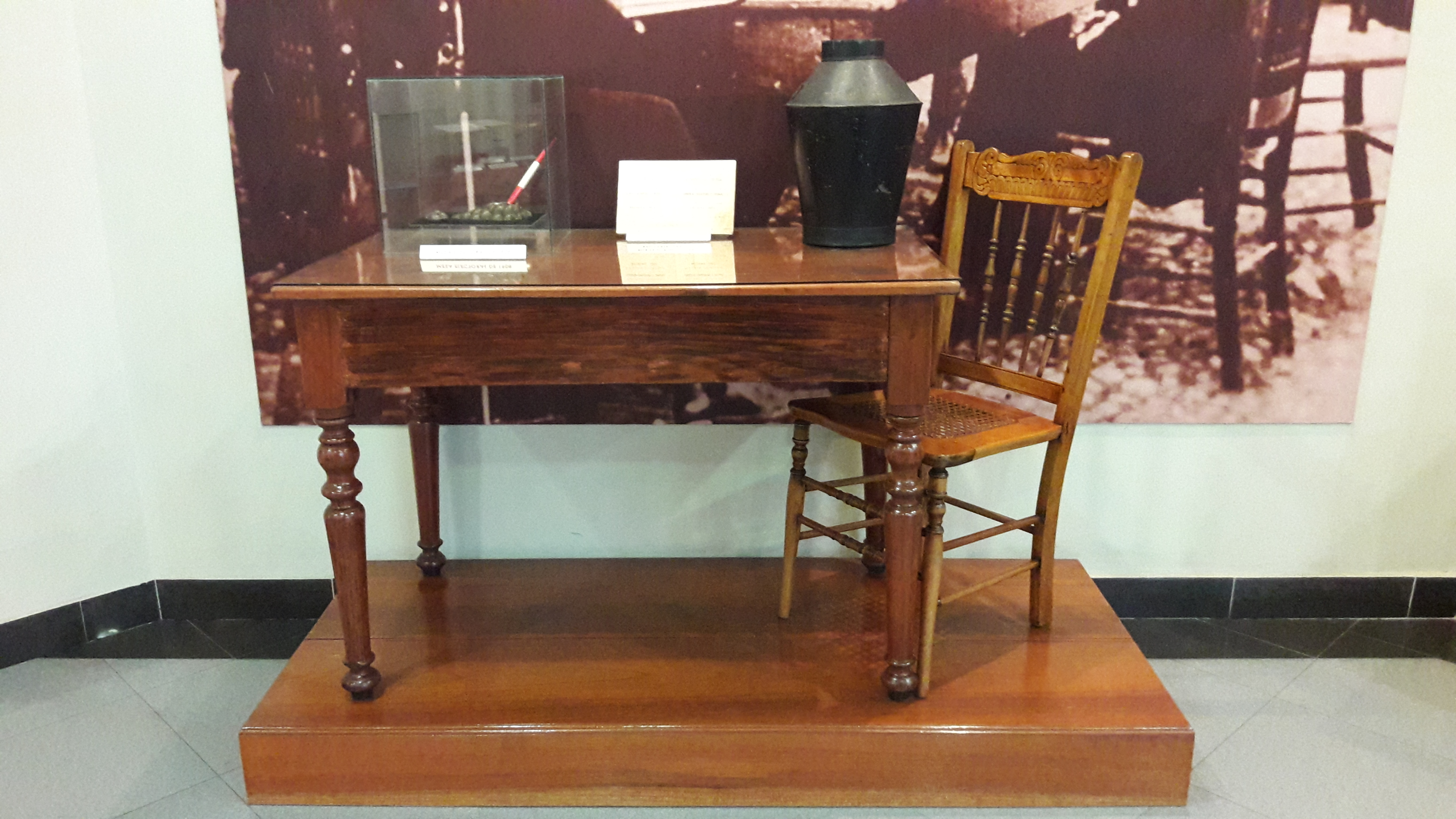
- Recreation of a polling station for the 1908 elections exhibited in the museum
- Established: 2005
- Location: Av. Nicolás de Piérola 1080
- Website: museoelectoral.jne.gob.pe

The Museum of Elections and Democracy (Spanish: Museo Electoral y de la Democracia) is a museum opened in 2005 and located in the headquarters of the National Jury of Elections (JNE), itself located next to Nicolás de Piérola Avenue in the historic centre of Lima. Its mission is to preserve, investigate, exhibit and disseminate part of the heritage related to the electoral history of Peru in the 19th and 20th centuries.

== Overview ==
The museum occupies a room of the JNE building. Its collection of more than 10,000 objects, of which 200 are on display, consists of paintings, photographs, instruments, replicas, facsimiles and documents on the electoral processes that Peru has had since the elections in Lima for constitutional councils of 1812. Most of the objects have been donated by descendants of various figures in Peruvian national political life, such as the former presidents Guillermo Billinghurst, Augusto B. Leguía and Luis Miguel Sánchez Cerro, the representative Matilde Pérez Palacio, the socialist Luciano Castillo Colonna, the historian and politician Luis Antonio Eguiguren, the journalist Genaro Carnero Checa, among others.

== See also ==
- National Jury of Elections
