= Bentin =

Bentin or Bentín can be both a middle name and a surname. Notable people with the name include:

- Ricardo Bentín Sánchez (1853–1921), Peruvian politician
- Kurt Bentin, recipient of the Knight's Cross of the Iron Cross in 1945
- Shlomo Bentin (1946–2012), Israeli neuropsychologist
