= Lino Alarco Brediñana =

Peruvian politician (1835–1903)

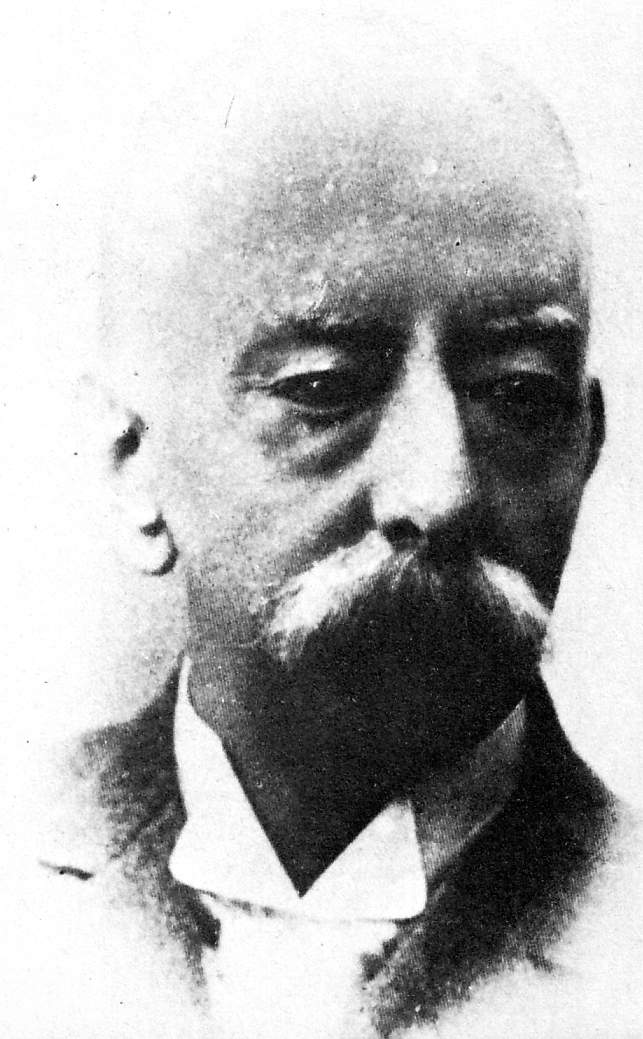
Lino Alarco

José Lino Alarco Brediñana (Lima, 23 September 1835 - Lima, 13 June 1903) was a Peruvian physician and politician. He was elected as the first vice president of Peru in 1903, under the ticket of President Manuel Candamo, but he died before taking office.

== Biography ==
Lino was born to Toribio Alarco and Ignacia Brediñana. He studied at the Noel College and at the Santo Toribio Council Seminary. In 1851, he began studying medicine at Colegio de la Independencia (later the Faculty of Medicine of the University of San Marcos) and graduated as a doctor in 1858 with a thesis on "Liver abscesses". He then served as assistant professor of Descriptive Anatomy and main professor of General Pathology and outpatient clinic for men, dictating this last subject in the old Hospital of San Andrés, and later in the Dos de Mayo Hospital, which was inaugurated in 1875 by the government of Manuel Pardo.

In 1870 he went to Europe to develop his knowledge, and travelled to France and Italy. He learned modern techniques of antisepsis and the application of chloroform as an anesthetic during surgeries. Back in Peru in 1872, he was the first individual to carry out major surgical operations, including an ovariotomy, the details of which he published in the journal La Gaceta Médica in 1878.

In 1876 he was elected senator from the department of Huancavelica to the Congress of the Republic of Peru. In 1880, he served as state Councilor in the dictatorship of Nicolás de Piérola. In 1881, he represented the province of Trujillo in the National Assembly convention in Ayacucho. In 1890, he was elected senator from the department of Amazonas and in 1891, he was elected alternate senator for Huancavelica and was elected in full capacity as senator in 1894.

Between 1899 and 1903, he served as vice-rector of the University of San Marcos.

For the presidential elections of May 1903, an alliance between the Civilista Party and the Constitutional or "Cacerista" Party was formed. The civilistas launched Manuel Candamo as a candidate for the presidency, while the constitutionalists, managed to elected Lino Alarco and Serapio Calderón as candidates for the first and second vice presidents, respectively. The alliance won in the elections, since there was no opposition. However, Lino Alarco died months before the transfer of power took place, so he did not take the oath of office. Although the issue of electing a new first vice president was discussed in Congress, it was not implemented. Candamo also died eight months after assuming power, victim of a sudden illness. So Serapio Calderón had to assume power temporarily, in his capacity as the sole vice president.

Lino Alarco was one of the founders of the Lima Medicine Society, an institution of whose he served as president in 1877. He is also among the founders of the National Academy of Medicine ( 1889 ). He was also a collaborator of La Gaceta Médica, an organ of the Lima Medicine Society.

== Bibliography ==
- Basadre Grohmann, Jorge: Historia de la República del Perú. 1822 - 1933, Eighth Edition, amended and expanded. Volume 7, pp. 1633-1634; volume 10, p. 2439. Edited by the newspaper "La República" of Lima and the University of "Ricardo Palma". Published in Santiago, Chile, 1998.
- Tauro del Pino, Alberto: Enciclopedia Ilustrada del Perú. Third Edition. Volume 1, AAA/ANG. Lima, PEISA, 2001. ISBN 9972-40-150-2
- Guerra, Margarita: Historia General del Perú. Tomo XI. La República Aristocrática. First Edition. Editorial Milla Batres. Lima, Perú, 1984.
