= 1919 Peruvian coup d'état =

1919 coup d'état in Peru

- Part of the second presidency of Augusto Leguía
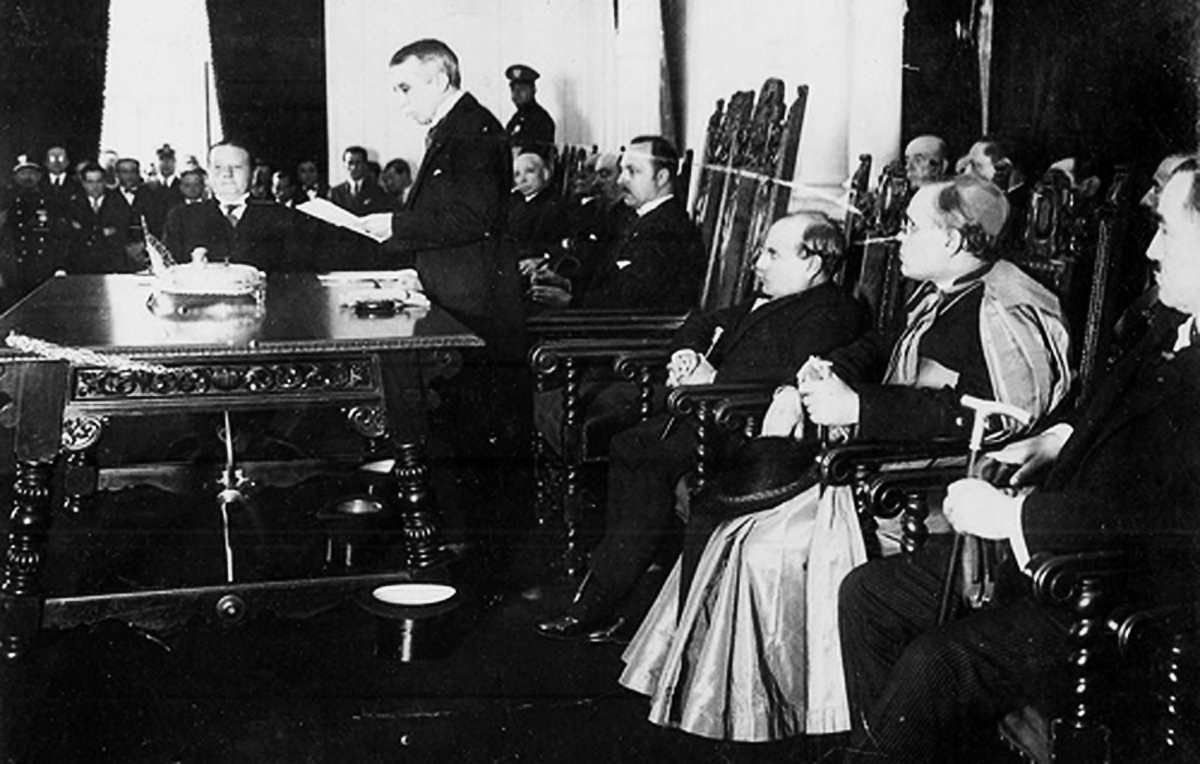
- Leguía is sworn in after the coup
Date	4 July 1919
Location	Government Palace, Lima
Result	Leguiísta victory: Overthrow of José Pardo y Barreda; Augusto B. Leguía becomes president

Belligerents
Government of Peru	Gendarmerie forces

Commanders and leaders
José Pardo y Barreda; Samuel del Alcázar; Pedro Pablo Martínez	Augusto B. Leguía

The 1919 Peruvian coup d'état took place on July 4, 1919, headed by former president and president-elect Augusto B. Leguía, with the support of the gendarmerie forces of Lima, against the outgoing government of José Pardo y Barreda. The result of the coup was successful for Leguía, who began the political process known as the New Motherland, through which he sought to modernise the country through a change in relations between the state and civil society, and which led to an eleven-year dictatorship. This new government ended abruptly due to another coup d'état in 1930, led by Commander Luis Miguel Sánchez Cerro.

== Background ==
In the 1919 elections, called by then-president José Pardo y Barreda, Ántero Aspíllaga (president of the ruling Civilista Party) and former president Augusto B. Leguía (candidate of the opposition Reformist Democratic Party) who had governed the country between 1908 and 1912. During the presidential campaign, Leguía presented himself as the standard bearer of the desires of university youth and the working and popular classes to change the structures of the country. His victory was in sight, as he was the most charismatic candidate.

The elections were held and the scrutiny showed Leguía as the winner; It was then that the Supreme Court annulled a large number of votes that favored the Democratic Reformist Party (the Supreme Court annulled some 15,000 votes in favour of Leguía) and it was feared that the elections would be annulled by Congress. Faced with this panorama, and alleging that his victory was not going to be recognised by the government, Leguía and his supporters staged a coup d'état in the early hours of July 4, 1919.

== Coup ==
The plan consisted of two battalions of the gendarmerie of Lima attacking the Government Palace. The plot, started on July 3, was a success since the Army did not repel the coup, the sailors of Callao Naval Base were inclined to put an end to the civilian government, and the conspirators managed to arrest President José Pardo, who was to complete his mandate in just 45 days, and part of his government. Leguía made his brand new entry into the Presidential Palace at six in the morning, being applauded by the related troops and civilian supporters.

The commander in chief of the national Army greets the chiefs and officers of the different bodies of the garrison and the navy, and informs them that by virtue of the movement carried out this morning, President José Pardo has been deposed, and proclaimed the one chosen by the people, A. B. Leguía.

— Proclamation of Colonel Gerardo Álvarez

There was an attempt to restore constitutional order by Colonel Samuel del Alcázar, who commanded an Army battalion that was deployed through the streets surrounding the main square. As the companies arrived at the palace, they joined the coup. After a brief skirmish between the gendarmes guarding the Presidential Palace and the troops accompanying Colonel Alcázar, he was arrested. For his part, the chief of the General Staff, Colonel Pedro Pablo Martínez, tried to gather the troops quartered in the Santa Beatriz barracks to assault the palace, but the soldiers had joined the coup, cheering on Leguía.

A mob attacked the facilities of the El Comercio newspaper, while another set fire to President Pardo's residence.

Pardo was exiled to New York City. Leguía assumed power as provisional president and his first act was to dissolve Congress, which was adverse to him. On July 21, Leguía published a manifesto in the official newspaper El Peruano, justifying his actions:

The consideration that it is an unavoidable duty to ensure that the popular vote already cast is not frustrated forces me to assume the Supreme Headquarters of the Republic as Provisional President.

— Augusto B. Leguía, 21 July 1919

The coup d'état was supported only by the Constitutional Party of Andrés Avelino Cáceres.

== Aftermath ==
Leguía called a plebiscite to submit to the vote of the citizens a series of constitutional reforms that he considered necessary; Among these reforms, it was contemplated to elect at the same time the President of the Republic and the members of Congress, both with five-year terms (previously, the presidential term was four years and Parliament was renewed by thirds every two years). In this way, he wanted to strengthen the Executive against the Legislative and avoid the exacerbated parliamentary opposition that he had suffered in his first government. He also called for elections to be held in September to form a new constituent congress, which would take the name of the National Assembly, whose mission would be to give a new Political Constitution, replacing that of 1860, which was the one in force at that time. The Assembly was installed on September 24, 1919, and was chaired by the sociologist and jurist Mariano H. Cornejo. On October 12, the Assembly proclaimed Leguía as Constitutional President of the Republic.

To reward the Army for its complicity in the coup, President Leguía assisted with promotions among the officers.

== See also ==
- History of Peru (1919–1930)

== Bibliography ==
- Basadre, Jorge (1998). Historia de la República del Perú (1822–1933). Vol. 11 (8th ed.). Lima: La República, Universidad Ricardo Palma.
- Pons Muzzo, Gustavo (1980). Historia del Perú. La República (1868-1980). Lima: Librería, Distribuidora Bazar “San Miguel” E.I.R.L.
