= 1899 Peruvian presidential election =

Presidential elections were held in Peru in 1899. Eduardo López de Romaña of the Civilista Party was elected with 97% of the vote.

== Results ==
| Candidate | Party | Votes | % |
|---|---|---|---|
| Eduardo López de Romaña | Civilista Party | 55,918 | 96.52 |
| Manuel Candamo | Independent | 1,337 | 2.31 |
| Manuel González Prada | Independent | 549 | 0.95 |
| Guillermo Billinghurst | Independent | 129 | 0.22 |
| Total | | 57,933 | 100.00 |
| Valid votes | | 57,933 | 99.40 |
| Invalid/blank votes | | 352 | 0.60 |
| Total votes | | 58,285 | 100.00 |
| Registered voters/turnout | | 108,597 | 53.67 |
Source: Tuesta
