= 1903 Peruvian presidential election =

Presidential elections were held in Peru in 1903. Manuel Candamo of the Civilista Party was elected unopposed.

== Results ==
Candidate	Party	Votes	%
Manuel Candamo	Civilista Party	92,781	100.00
Total		92,781	100.00
Valid votes		92,781	98.94
Invalid/blank votes		997	1.06
Total votes		93,778	100.00
Registered voters/turnout		143,142	65.51
Source: Tuesta
