= Augusto Durand Maldonado =

Peruvian politician (1870–1923)

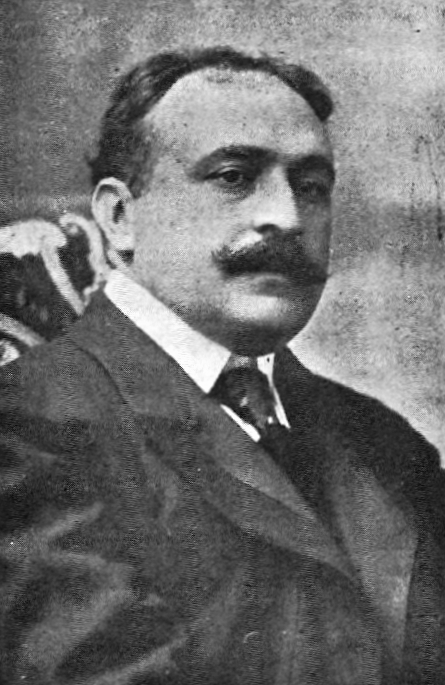

President of the Chamber of Deputies
- In office July 28, 1895 – July 28, 1896
- President: Manuel Candamo
- Preceded by: Manuel María del Valle
- Succeeded by: Wenceslao Valera

Personal details
- Born: September 6, 1870 Huánuco, Peru
- Died: March 31, 1923 (aged 52) Pacific Ocean
- Cause of death: Diaphragmatic hernia complications caused by gunshot wound

Nicolás Augusto Durand Fernández-Maldonado (September 6, 1870 — March 31, 1923) was a Peruvian politician and agricultural businessman. He became popular for organizing revolutions against various governments of the so-called Aristocratic Republic, leading armed groups. He was a deputy in several periods, and presided over his chamber in 1895–1896. He was also founder of the Liberal Party (1902) and director of the newspaper La Prensa in Lima.

His last revolutionary adventure was against the continuity plans of President Augusto B. Leguía, but after being captured in Paita, he died on the way to Callao, aboard the ship that was transporting him. A rumour spread that he died of poisoning, but it is most likely that he died of an illness. He is also remembered for promoting the industrialization of coca.
