= 1912 Peruvian presidential election =

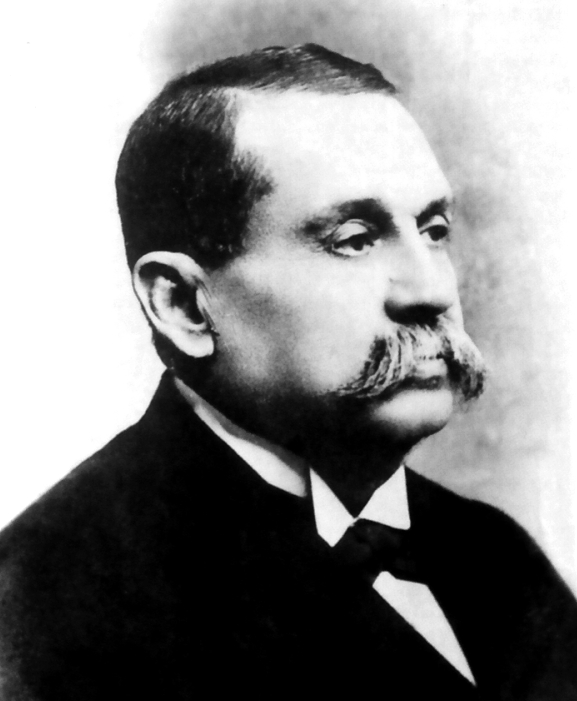
Guillermo E. Billinghurst, winner of the election

Presidential elections were held in Peru in 1912. Guillermo Billinghurst of the Democratic Party was elected president.
