= Morropón =

Morropón may refer to:

- Morropón province, one of eight provinces of the Piura Region, in Peru
- Morropón District, one of ten districts of the province Morropón
