= Salt Tax Revolt (Peru) =

1896–1897 revolt in South America

- Date: August 30, 1896–May 1897
- Location: Huanta, Peru
- Result: Revolt suppressed

Parties
Peruvian Army	Indigenous peasants

The Salt Tax Revolt (Spanish: Revuelta de la Sal) was an armed conflict between the indigenous communities of Huanta and the Peruvian Army that lasted from August 30, 1896, to May 1897.
