= 1919 Peruvian constitutional referendum =

A constitutional referendum was held in Peru on 25 August 1919. The proposed reforms were approved by voters.

== Background ==
On 7 April 1919 President-elect Augusto B. Leguía launched a presidential coup. On 10 July he issued two decrees, one calling Congressional elections for 24 August and one for a referendum on constitutional reform on the following day. The newly elected Congress would be able to discuss and supplement the constitution, but would be bound by the referendum result.

== Amendments ==
The new constitution had 19 chapters. It provided for a presidential term of five years, with the President elected by Congress. Congress would be elected in whole every five years, whilst there would also be three Provincial Assemblies. It also provided for six years of free and compulsory primary education, limited the death penalty to cases of murder and treason, and ensured that martial law could not curtail personal freedoms.

== Aftermath ==
After being approved by voters, the constitution was adopted by Congress on 27 December 1919 by a vote of 79 to 0.
