= Jorge Polar =

Peruvian intellectual, poet and politician

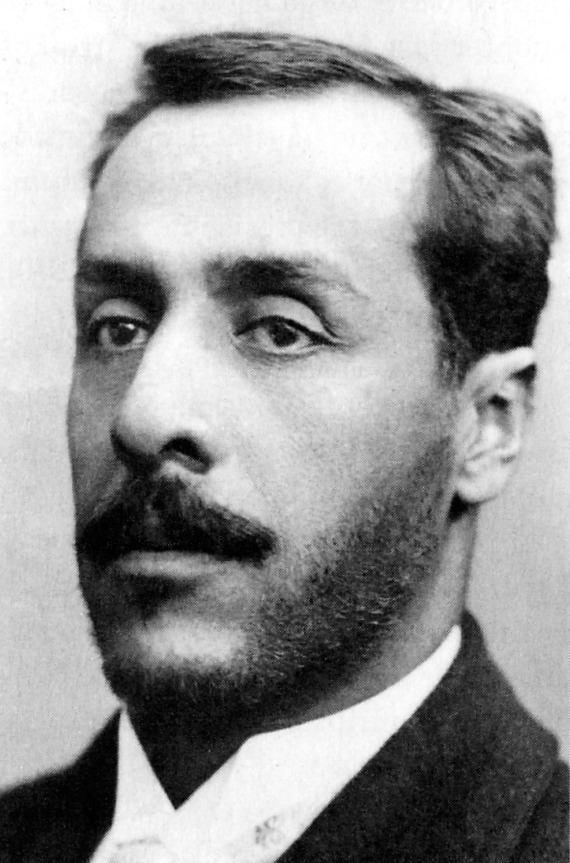
Jorge Polar Vargas (1856 - 1932) was a Peruvian lawyer, writer, poet, and politician.

Jorge Polar (1856–1932) was a Peruvian intellectual, poet, and politician born in Arequipa, Peru, on April 21 of 1856. After leaving a trace in university teaching, cultural journalism, national politics and the administration of justice, he died on June 6, 1932.

== Education ==
He completed his secondary education at the National School of Independence, which was founded by Simon Bolivar. Then he entered the University of St. Augustine [1], and at age 18, he earned his Juris Doctor in 1874. Later he traveled to Lima and the Universidad Mayor de San Marcos [2], where he obtained his Ph.D. in history, philosophy and literature.

== Works ==
- A Biography of Juan Manuel Polar, 1886
- Literary Studies, 1886
- Something in Prose, 1887
- Poems, 1887
- Lucia and Julia Letter, 1887
- White (novel), 1888
- Arequipa, 1891, 1922
- Light Philosophy, 1895
- Stanzas of a poem, 1896
- Aesthetics, 1903
- At the University, 1904
- Confession of a Professor, 1925
- Our Melgar, 1928
- Introduction to the Study of Modern Philosophy, 1928
