= Ricardo Bentín Sánchez =

Peruvian politician (1853–1921)

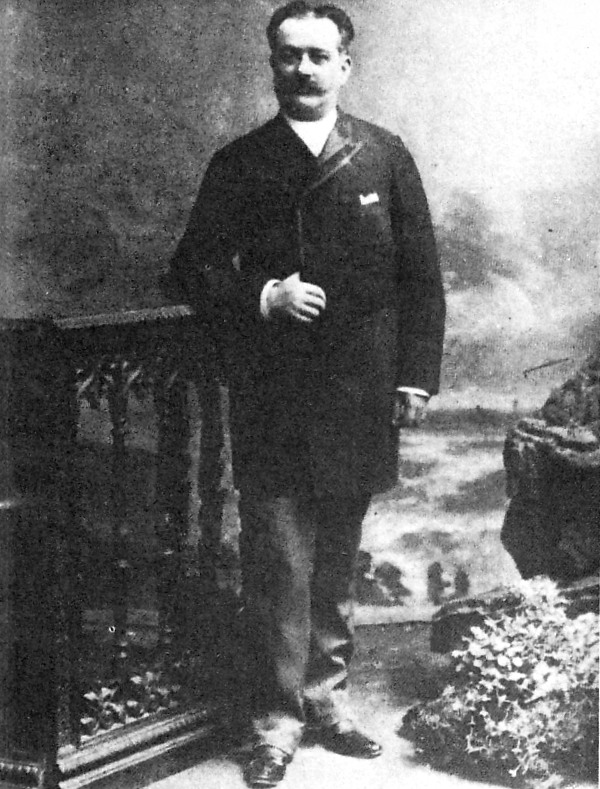
Ricardo Bentín

Ricardo Bentín Sánchez (21 September 1853 – 22 September 1921) was a Peruvian politician, soldier and businessman. He participated in the Peruvian resistance during the Pacific War. He became President of the Congress of the Republic (1913) and First Vice President of the Republic (1915-1919).

== Biography ==
Bentín was born in Lima to Antonio Bentín y La Fuente (1826-1897) and Manuela Sánchez Laos. His father was a mining businessman of British descent. Antonio served as Prime Minister and Mayor of Lima and was a founding member of the Democratic Party.

He studied at Noboa College and then at the College of Our Lady of Guadalupe. In 1870, he entered the Universidad Nacional Mayor de San Marcos to study Law, although he later left the university to support his father in his mining business.

He married Rosa Mujica Carassa, daughter of the mining businessman Elías Mujica y Trasmonte. The couple had eight children, including José and Ricardo Bentín Mujica: the latter served as president of the brewery "Backus & Johnston" and founder of the "Club Sporting Cristal".

In 1879 he was appointed sub-prefect of Huarochirí Province. When Chile declared war on Peru that same year, he enlisted in the Reserve Army. While serving in the army, he participated in the defense of Lima. Along with his fellow soldiers he played a significant role in occupying the Olleros and Sisicaya ravines, while avoiding the invasion of the enemy. In addition to assuming the leadership of the montoneras guerrillas and rescuing the abandoned camps from battlefields like San Juan and Miraflores, he was promoted to the rank of sergeant major (1882). After the occupation of Lima, he joined the resistance led by General Andrés A. Cáceres. He actively fought throughout the "Campaña de la Breña", one of the last phases of the Pacific War. He was promoted to the rank of lieutenant colonel of cavalry in 1884.

After the war with Chile, he retired from military service and returned to civilian life, dedicating himself to mining as well as political activity. In 1886, he was elected deputy for Lima and Huarochirí. While serving as a deputy, he voiced opposition to the signing of the Grace Contract between the first government of President Cáceres and the English Committee of Bondholders. In opposition to the actions of the government, he resigned from Congress in 1889.

In retirement, he dedicated himself to mining activities, signing an agreement with Backus & Johnston Co.. The company settled its properties in Aguas Calientes (Casapalca), which was a silver-rich region. In 1889, Backus & Johnston established a refinery in Casapalca, where they extracted silver, lead, and copper. However, in 1919, the "Cerro de Pasco" Copper Corporation acquired the Backus & Johnston Mining company. Bentín sold the corporation the mines Backus and Johnson possessed in Aguas Calientes. In return, he received shares in the Backus & Johnston Ltd. Brewery, which was then owned by the corporation.

In 1895, he returned to Congress, again as a deputy of the constituency of Huarochirí. Bentin supported the revolution of Nicolas de Pierola against the second government of Cáceres. He was re-elected as a deputy in 1918.

Bentin was elected the president of the Chamber of Deputies in 1913, during the checkered government of Guillermo Billinghurst. Billinghurst threatened to dissolve the parliament, due to the frequent confrontations he and the legislature had. But he himself ended up overthrown in 1914.

Bentin was elected First Vice President of the Republic in the second government of José Pardo (1915-1919). After the coup d'état of Augusto Leguía in 1919, he withdrew from political activities.

He died in Lima on 22 September 1921, and was buried in the Matías Maestro Presbyterian Cemetery in Lima.

In 1951, in the Rímac District of Lima, a school named Institución Edicativa Emblemetica Ricardo Bentín was built in his honor, which still bears his name .

== Bibliography ==
- Basadre Grohmann, Jorge: Historia de la República del Perú (1822 - 1933), Volumes 12, 13, and 14. Edited by the Empresa Editora El Comercio S. A. Lima, 2005. ISBN 9972-205-74-6 (V.12) - ISBN 9972-205-75-4 (V.13) - ISBN 9972-205-76-2 (V.14)
- Tauro del Pino, Alberto: Enciclopedia Ilustrada del Perú. Third Edition. Volume 3, BEI/CAN. Lima, PEISA, 2001. ISBN 9972-401-52-5
- Muchaypiña Garcia, Fernando (1997). Ricardo Bentín Sanchez (1853 - 1997).
