= 1908 Peruvian presidential election =

Presidential elections were held in Peru in May 1908. Augusto B. Leguía of the Civilista Party was elected unopposed.

== Results ==
Candidate	Party	Votes	%
Augusto B. Leguía	Civilista Party	133,732	100.00
Total		133,732	100.00
Valid votes		133,732	72.53
Invalid/blank votes		50,654	27.47
Total votes		184,386	100.00
Source: Tuesta
