= Serapio Calderón =

President of Peru in 1904

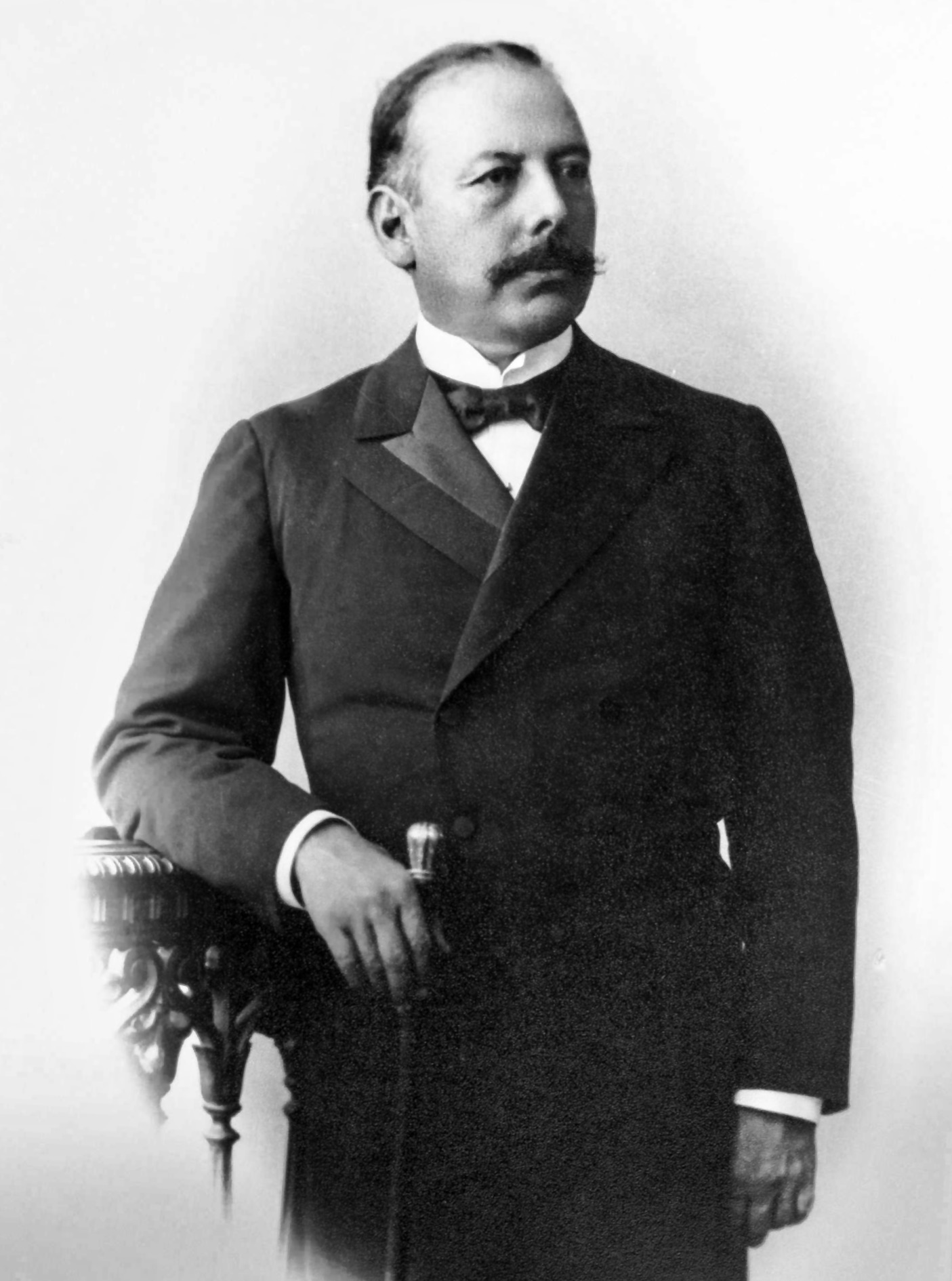

34th President of Peru
- In office May 7, 1904 – September 24, 1904
- Prime Minister: José Pardo y Barreda; Alberto Elmore Fernández de Córdoba
- Preceded by: Manuel Candamo
- Succeeded by: José Pardo y Barreda

Personal details
- Born: September 14, 1843 Paucartambo, Peru
- Died: April 3, 1922 (aged 78) Cusco, Peru

Serapio Calderón Lasso de la Vega (September 14, 1843 – April 3, 1922) served as Interim President of Peru, officially as the President of the Government Junta, from May 7, 1904 to September 24, 1904.

Calderón was born in Paucartambo (Cusco Region) in September 1843. He was elected second vice president with Manuel Candamo in 1903. The first vice president was Lino Alarco, who had died before his investiture. Under such circumstances, Calderón had to assume the presidency on May 7, 1904 after the death of Candamo. Calderon called for elections and José Pardo y Barreda of the Civilista Party was declared the winner. He governed until September 24, 1904, before he was succeeded by Pardo.

He died in Cusco in April 1922.

Political offices
| Preceded by Manuel Candamo | Interim President of Peru (President of the Government Junta); 1904 | Succeeded by José Pardo y Barreda |
