= Liberal Party (Peru) =

Political party of Peru

Liberal Party (Spanish: Partido Liberal), was a political party in Peru. It was founded in 1901 by Augusto Durand Maldonado.
