= José Pardo y Barreda =

President of Peru variously in the early 20th century

José Pardo
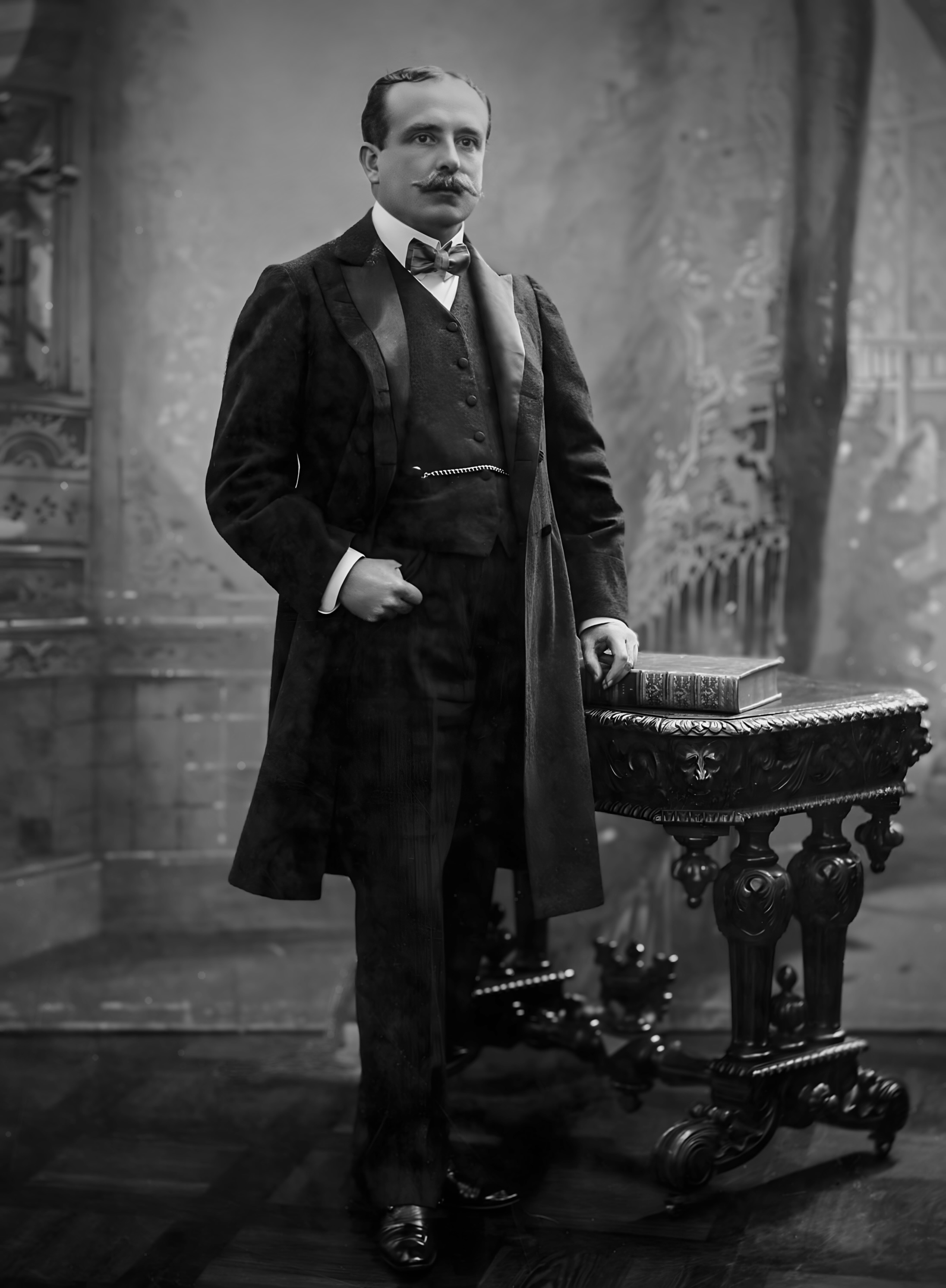

President of Peru
- In office September 24, 1904 – September 24, 1908
- Prime Minister: Augusto Bernardino Leguía y Salcedo; Agustín Tovar; Carlos A. Washburn Salas
- Vice President: José Salvador Cavero Ovalle; Serapio Calderón
- Preceded by: Serapio Calderón
- Succeeded by: Augusto B. Leguía
- In office August 18, 1915 – July 4, 1919
- Prime Minister: Carlos Isaac Abril Galindo; Enrique de la Riva-Agüero y Looz Corswaren; Francisco Tudela y Varela; Germán Arenas y Loayza; Juan Manuel Zuloaga
- Vice President: Ricardo Bentín Sánchez; Melitón Carvajal
- Preceded by: Oscar Benavides
- Succeeded by: Augusto B. Leguía

Prime Minister of Peru
- In office September 8, 1903 – May 14, 1904
- President: Manuel Candamo
- Preceded by: Eugenio Larrabure y Unanue
- Succeeded by: Alberto Elmore Fernández de Córdoba

Personal details
- Born: José Simón Pardo y Barreda; 24 February 1864 Lima, Peru
- Died: 3 August 1947 (aged 83) Lima, Peru
- Party: Civilista Party
- Parent(s): Manuel Justo Pardo y Lavalle; Mariana Barreda y Osma
- Occupation: Politician
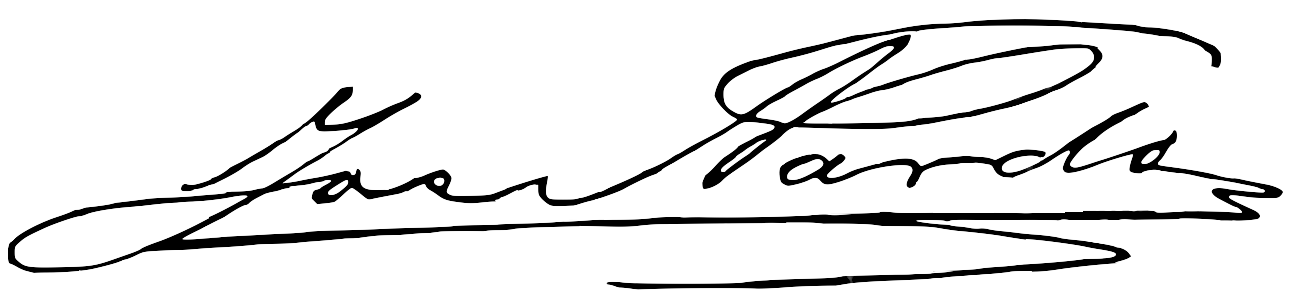
- Signature

José Simón Pardo y Barreda (February 24, 1864 – August 3, 1947) was a Peruvian politician who served twice as President of Peru, in 1904–1908 and 1915–1919.

Born in Lima, Peru, he was the son of Manuel Justo Pardo y Lavalle, who had been the first civilian president of Peru (1872–1876) and the founder of the Civilista Party; he is one of two second-generation Peruvian presidents. (Manuel Prado, son of former dictator Mariano Ignacio Prado, is the other.) His grandfather, Felipe Pardo y Aliaga (1806–1868), was a distinguished diplomat, writer and politician who was also a Foreign Minister and Vice President of the Peruvian Council of State before, during and after the presidencies of Vivanco and Castilla.

José Pardo headed the Civilista Party and was Foreign Minister under Eduardo López de Romaña and then Prime Minister (1903–1904) under Manuel Candamo. After Candamo's death, Serapio Calderón became the interim president and called for new elections. The Civilista Party named José Pardo as its candidate, while the Democratic Party presented the candidacy of Nicolás de Piérola, who retired early before the elections mentioning a "lack of guarantees." This fact led Pardo to become elected. Both his presidential terms were marked by liberal politics.

His government was marked by pushing for better education for all Peruvians. Elementary education in Peru, according to the Law of 1876 proposed by his father, Manuel Pardo, was under the responsibility of the municipalities throughout the country. José Pardo, under his Secretary of Justice and Instruction, decided to confront the problem.

The law promulgated in 1905 reformed the education system to depend on the central government. It also called for primary education to be free and compulsory in far-away places such as villages and mines, and that at least a small school for all children be located in any place with more than two hundred inhabitants. The Escuela Normal de Varones ("Normal school for males") was founded for the formation of male teachers, as well as the Escuela Normal de Mujeres ("Normal school for females").

Pardo created a General Branch of Instruction on which inspectors in charge of the work of surveillance in the whole Republic depended. In the cultural field the following were established: The National Academy of History, the School of Fine Arts (Bellas Artes), the National Academy of Music, and the National Museum of History. The superior combat school was also founded to form major state officers.

During his second government José Pardo confronted the consequences of the First World War, as well as the labor agitation for the obtainment of the "8 working hours" a day. It was finally granted on January 15, 1919.

An Act of October 1916 prescribed (as noted by one study) “minimum wages for native workers and the payment of wages in current coin.” An Act of November 1918 prohibited (with exceptions) the employment of children under the age of 14, together with underground work for those under the age of 18 and night work for those under the age of 21. An Act of December 1918 prohibited work on Sundays and civic holidays in various workplaces. Also in 1918, a law was passed safeguarding pregnant workers.

With barely a month before the end of his second term, he was ousted in a coup by Augusto B. Leguía. He spent the next eleven years in exile in the South of France, until his return to Lima. He died there in 1947.

In 1900, Pardo married his first cousin, Carmen Heeren Barreda. The marriage produced seven children: Manuel, José (the Marquis of Fuente Hermosa de Miranda, until his death in 1999), Enrique, Carmen, Juan, Oscar and Felipe. The current Marquis, José Pardo Paredes (born 1947), is one of President Jose Pardo's grandchildren.

== Birth and family ==
He was born in Lima as the third of the ten children of one of the main prestigious families of Peru, owning the Tumán district and of aristocratic lineage, as he was descended from Conquistador Jerómino de Aliaga.

His father was businessman Manuel Pardo y Lavelle (later Mayor of Lima, leader of the Civil Party of Peru and President of Peru), who himself was son of son of poet and writer Felipe Pardo y Aliaga, who was also Minister of Foreign Relations under Manuel Ignacio de Vivianco and Ramón Castilla.

His mother was Mariana Barreda y Osma, son of the wealthy businessman Felipe Barreda y Aguilar, nicknamed: "the Five Million Man" through which he was related to various personalities of politicians.

Among his siblings, included Felipe Pardo y Barreda, 5th Marquis of Fuente Hermosa de Miranda, and the mining engineer Juan Pardo y Barreda, who was President of the House of Representatives.

He was also cousin of Felipe de Osma y Pardo, Pedro de Osma y Pardo and José de la Riva-Agüro y Osma, 5th Marquis of Montealegre de Aulestia and nephew of José Antonio de Lavalle and Enrique Barreda y Osma. It was by these family relations that Manuel Gonzalez Prada would ironize years later:

A José Pardo y Barreda in the Presidency, an Enrique de la Riva Agüero in the Head of the cabinet, a Felipe de Osma y Pardo in the Supreme Court, a Pedro de Osma y Pardo as Municipal Mayor, a José Antonio de Lavalle y Pardo as a prosecutor, announcing a Felipe Pardo y Barreda in the Legation of the United States, a Juan Pardo y Barreda in the Congress and all of the other "Pardos", de Lavalle, de Osma y de Riva Agüero, wherever they fit in.

His father was murdered in 1878 when he was president of the Chamber of the Senate, although his family managed to rebuild his fortune.

== Studies ==
Jose Pardo attended his studies at the Institute of Lima under the guidance of German teachers. By then, the War of the Pacific had broken out, and Lima was besieged by the enemy forces. His brothers, Felipe and Juan y José Pardo were enlisted into the army. José Pardo was 16 years old at the time and became a Corporal, but due to an illness had to retire from the army and go to Jauja. His brothers Felipe and Juan took part in the Battle of Miraflores.

When the capital of Peru was occupied by the Chilean troops, in 1881 he entered the Faculty of Letters at the National University of San Marcos enrolling in the faculty of Letters and Jurisprudence. He obtained his diploma in 1882 and bachelors' in Letters in 1883. Later, he would receive a diploma, bachelors' and doctorate in Political Sciences and Administration with his thesis on the "Principles that the Private International Law establishes to resolve legal conflicts and matters of marriage". He also graduated with a Diploma in Jurisprudence and finally with the title of Lawyer in 1886. Next, he joined the ranks of the Civilista Party that had been founded by his father, eventually becoming one of its leaders.

== Diplomatic career ==
In 1888, under General Andes Avelino Cáceres's government, he was appointed as Secretary of the First Class of the Peruvian Legation in Spain having assumed the functions of Charge' D'Affaires,from 2 July 1888 to 16 October 1890, as well as the defence of Peru during the Ecuadorian–Peruvian territorial dispute, the arbitration of which was entrusted to the Spanish crown. On this corresponding occasion, he wrote the first version of Alegato del Perú in three volumes, an important jurisdictional study that has since then, been a fundamental document supporting the position of Peruvians in the issue of national boundaries. It presented a demonstration of José Pardo's mastery of history, geography, and international law as a writer. These fundamentals foreshadowed that the victory of Peru was certain, which decided that Ecuador would illegally and violently repudiate the arbitral jurisdiction that they had submitted. Peru and Ecuadors' boundary question ended (for the time) with the signing of the Treaty of Rio de Janeiro between the foreign ministers of Peru and Ecuador. The arbitration trial was found in shock when, "José Pardo presented his resignation to the diplomatic post that he had held so successfully." "Such was the brilliant performance carried out, to assume the jurisdictial defence of our legitimate interests." until the date in which it was accepted by the government on 16 October 1890.

== Businessman and university professor ==
Back to Perú, in 1890, Pardo abandoned his diplomatic career to devote himself to administrating his sugar estate in Tumán, located in Chiclayo. He was the founding partner of the Club of the Union of Chiclayo. In Lima, he took part in negotiations to begin construction to urbanised the District of La Victoria and funded in a textile factory in Vitarte, that gave work to a large number of unemployed people, who would, in the following century, be the leaders of social struggles. He edited the newsletter of the National Society of Agriculture until July 1900 and in November of that year, in a session of a General Meeting of the Society of Industry was elected as a member and delegate to the Institute of Technology.

In 1891 he was appointed as a member of the Geographical Society of Lima. In 1900, the University of San Marcos required him for the Faculty of Political and Administrative Sciences, conferring upon him the position of Diplomatic Law and History of the Treaties of Peru, that he held until 1903. He also represented the University at the Council of Superiors of Public Instruction (1901–1903), and prepared the Law of Secondary School Education Reform that would be approved in 1904.

== Return to politics ==
Under Manuel Candamo's government (the second civilian government after Manuel Pardo's) José Pardo was appointed as minister of Foreign Relations, a position that he held from 8 September 1903 to 14 May 1904, while Augusto B. Leguia another young civilian, held the Ministry of Finance. But Candamo did not complete his presidential term of 4 years as he died 8 months after assuming the presidency, on 7 May 1904, a victim of illness.

Jose Pardo married with first cousin Carmen Heeren Barreda in the St. Theresa Church on 29 January 1900. The newlyweds were blessed by the delegate Monsignor Gasparri. Later, as leader of the Civilist Party, he became president of Peru on 2 occasions.

- First Government (1904–1908)
- Second Government (1915–1919)

== 1904 elections ==
After the death of Candamo, the second vice-president, Serapio Calderón assumed the presidency, as the first vice-president, Lino Alarco, had also died. Hence, it was up to Serapio to call for a new presidential election, and in the presidential elections, presented two options:

- The ruling party, the Civilist Party, allied with the Constitutional Party or the cacerista, presented as candidate, José Pardo y Barreda. He belonged to the youth and civil reformist sector of the Civilist Party, who ousted the old president of the Civilist Party, Isaac Alzamora, as its candidate.
- The Democratic Party, in alliance with the Liberal Party, launched the candidacy of the old caudillo, Nicolas de Piérola, ex-president of Peru.

Piérola, after giving a series of vibrant speeches, withdrew shortly before the elections, citing lack of guarantees. With no opposition, José Pardo won the election with 100% of the vote.

== First Presidency (1904-1908) ==
José Pardo was 40 years old when he assumed the presidency, on 24 September 1904. His government was respectful of the law, institutions, and liberty, though his political aim was to create a Civilista Party government, and not a national one.

During his government, he allowed wide freedom of the press. The opposition newspapers against the government, El Liberal, by Augusto Durand, and La Prensa, founded in 1903 by Pedro de Osma and since 1905 was directed by Alberto Ulloa Cisneros, a fiery and combative journalist. But this opposition was made within of the frameworks of the law, without breaking it excessively. Because of this, Pardo was able to make some trips to provinces, something no democratically elected president had ever done.

Pardo had three government cabinets, the longest duration of them being presided by Augusto B. Leguia until July 1907, when he resigned to prepare for his presidential candidacy.The second cabinet, headed by Agustín Tovar Aguilar, lasted only from August to October 1907, and the third and final cabinet, headed by Carlos Washburn, lasted less than a year. During this period the struggles increased in the parliament between the Civilista Party and the Democratic Party.

The important works and events of the government were:

=== Economics ===
As Minister of Finance, Augusto B. Leguia realized important reforms in the economic sector.

He reopened the national credit to foreign markets when Congress approved of a loan of 600000 Libras carried out in 1905 with the German Transatlantic Bank. After the success of this first loan, he planned to execute another loan of 3 million Libras, for the construction of railroads, though there was stubborn opposition from parliament this time. He founded the Fund of Deposits and Consignment (now the Banco de la Nación), an institution in-charge of the safekeeping of security whose deposit was ordered or accepted by the judiciary or public office. He renewed the contract with the National Company of Collection, responsible for the collection of contributions or taxes, but adjusted to new conditions to reduce the onerous commissions that the company charged. He began operations of the National Salt Company, the successor of a preceding company responsible for collecting the salt tax (1906). He signed an arrangement with the Peruvian Corporation, the company responsible for the railroads, that he undertook to continue the extension of the railway lines. He improved the system of customs to increase revenue from the coming of guano and cotton. He issued a new regulation for the tribunal of the supreme court of accounts, responsible for the fiscal accounts.

=== Education ===
The first government of Jose Pardo was characterized by a grand push for education. The primary education in Peru was, according to the law of 1876, issued by Manuel Prado, in the hands of the municipalities. Jose Pardo, under the management of his Minister of Justice and Education, Jorge Polar (later succeeded by Carlos Washburn), decided to radically change the situation.

=== Start of Social Legislation ===
In 1904, and faced with the growing labour unrest, the government, commissioned the illustrious jurist José Matías Manzanilla to draft a project of Labor Legislation, which has generally been called the Social Legislation. In his message to Congress in 1905, Pardo made these projects known, but after years of debate, approval was postponed, and only in 1911 was one of them was approved by Congress, regarding compensation for work accidents.

== 1915 Peruvian Election ==
Back to Peru, Pardo was elected rector of the University of San Marcos which he assumed on 30 November 1914, but he served only for a year, as in 1915, he was designated as candidate for the presidential election by the Convention of the Civilist Party, liberal and constitutional, that was convened by general Oscar Benavides. who was the President of Peru (de facto) after the Coup of 1914. Pardo faced off against the very popular candidacy of Carlos Piérola (son of the old caudillo, Nicolás de Piérola) of the Democratic Party. José Pardo won with 131,289 votes, against Carlos Piérola's 13,151.

== See also ==
- Politics of Peru
- List of presidents of Peru

Political offices
Preceded by Eugenio Larrabure y Unanue	Prime Minister of Peru; September 8, 1903 – May 14, 1904	Succeeded by Alberto Fernández de Córdova
Preceded by Serapio Calderón	President of Peru; September 1904 – September 1908	Succeeded by Augusto B. Leguía
Preceded by Oscar R. Benavides	President of Peru; August 1915 – July 1919	Succeeded by Augusto B. Leguía
