= Manuel Candamo =

President of Peru from 1903 to 1904

Manuel González de Candamo e Iriarte
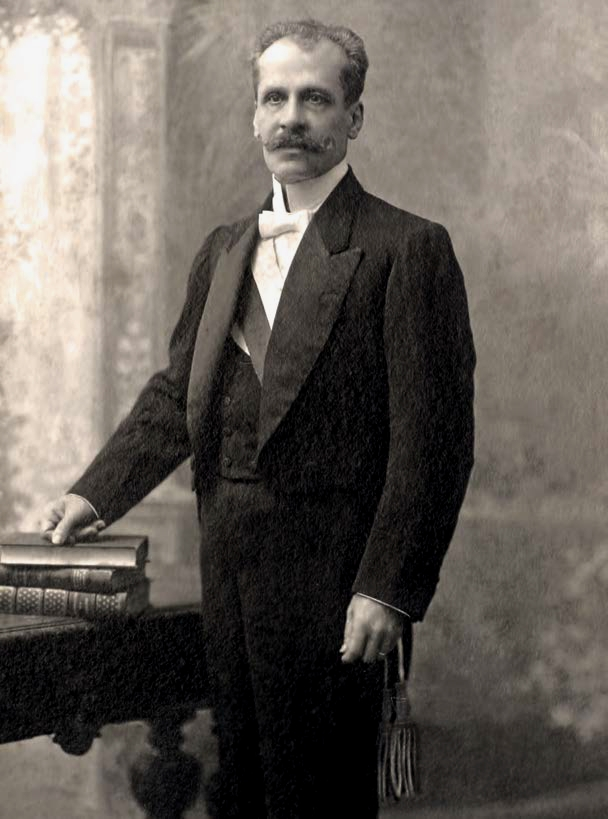

President of the Government Junta of Peru
- In office March 20, 1895 – September 8, 1895
- Preceded by: Andrés Avelino Cáceres
- Succeeded by: Nicolás de Piérola

33rd President of Peru
- In office September 8, 1903 – May 7, 1904
- Prime Minister: José Pardo y Barreda
- Vice President: Lino Alarco Brediñana; Serapio Calderón
- Preceded by: Eduardo López de Romaña
- Succeeded by: Serapio Calderón

Personal details
- Born: July 14, 1841 Lima, Peru
- Died: May 7, 1904 (aged 62) Arequipa, Peru
- Party: Civilista Party
- Spouse: Teresa Álvarez-Calderón

Manuel González de Candamo e Iriarte (July 14, 1841 – May 7, 1904) served as the 33rd President of Peru from 1903 until his death in 1904. He also served as Interim President of Peru, officially as the President of the Government Junta, in 1895.

== Early life and family ==
Born in a wealthy family, Manuel was the son of Pedro González de Candamo e Astorga (Valparaíso, Chile, June 30, 1799 – Lima, January 22, 1866), Peruvian Ambassador – then the richest man in Peru – and wife María de las Mercedes Iriarte e Odria; paternal grandson of Alfonso González de Candamo y Prieto (born in Asturias the son of Gaspar González de Candamo and wife Eulalia Prieto) and wife Petronila de Astorga y Urizar (born in Valparaíso) and maternal grandson of Pedro Ignacio Iriarte y Velasco-Patiño, mine owner from Huancayo, who bought the Hacienda Lobatón in 1819 and half of the Hacienda Cónsac, and wife Paula Odria y Granados, daughter of the owners of Hacienda Rumichaca Juan Ignacio Odria and wife Manuela Granados, sister of Marcelo Granados (La Asunción de Mito, 1758 – ?), Governor of La Trinidad de Huancayo.

Manuel Candamo spend his early years in the College of Our Lady of Guadalupe. After graduating from high school, he was accepted in the National University of San Marcos, where he obtained a bachelor's degree on Jurisprudence.

== Early political career ==
=== Pezet and the Chinchan Islands War ===
In 1863, Candamo started to work for El Comercio, one of the oldest newspapers in the capital. From there, he was a harsh critic of President Juan Antonio Pezet and the "Vivanco-Pareja Treaty", specifically for the way of how the government was handling the diplomatic crisis with Spain. For his actions, he was exiled to Chile, returning only after Mariano Ignacio Prado's successfully launched a coup against Pezet.

After the revolution, he was an active supporter of Prado during the Chincha Islands War. When the Peruvian Congress refused to recognize Prado's government, Candamo traveled to Chile as part of the Peruvian diplomatic mission. He did not stay in Chile, and left that country for Europe and Asia.

=== Civilista Party ===
Manuel Cándamo, together with Manuel Pardo, was among the founding members of the Civilista Party. The party itself achieved public notoriety for being the first organized political party in Peru, and because it was also the first one to be composed primarily of civilians. During this period, Cándamo successfully started once again his political career and several economic businesses.

== War of the Pacific and Reconstruction ==
After the collapse of the Peruvian Southern Armies and the imminent invasion of Lima, Cándamo took part in the defense of the city, fighting in the Battles of San Juan and Miraflores. When the city is occupied by the Chilean Army, Cándamo and several other prominent politicians are deported to Chile due to their opposition to any peace proposal that involved ceding Tarapacá, Tacna and Arica to the Chileans.

Candamo returned to Peru after the Treaty of Ancón was signed and the war over, and is once again deported for his opposition to President Miguel Iglesias and support to Andrés Avelino Cáceres. Once Iglesias is overthrown and Cáceres is in power, Candamo was elected to the Senate, reaching its presidency in 1888, 1890 and 1892.

== Later political career ==
=== President of the Junta ===
A member of the Civilista Party, Candamo served as mayor of Lima. After Andrés Avelino Cáceres was forced to resign from the Presidency in 1894, Candamo was selected to head a "Provisional Government Junta" and to call for new elections. Nicolás de Piérola, allied with the Civilista Party, won the election.

=== President of the Senate ===
During the administration of Eduardo López de Romaña, he was elected President of the Peruvian Senate (both 1897 and 1901). This was done after the Civilista and Democratic parties reached a compromise and divided their political influence in the government.

For the Election of 1903, Cándamo was regarded as a moderate candidate and the more trusted political figure in the Civilista Party. After being elected president, Cándamo became ill and died in office. He was married to Teresa Alvarez-Calderón.

Following a brief interim government headed by Serapio Calderón, Cándamo was succeeded by his foreign minister José Pardo.

== Personal life ==
Manuel Candamo married Teresa Álvarez-Calderón, and had two daughters. One daughter, Teresa De La Cruz, founded the convent Canonesas de La Cruz, and was given the title of Servant of God in 1981 by the Catholic Church, which means she is being considered for possible sainthood.

He was the brother-in-law of Anglo-Peruvian guano millionaire John Pablo Bryce, and thus a great-great uncle Alexandra Hamilton, Duchess of Abercorn, and Natalia Grosvenor, Duchess of Westminster, as well as a great uncle of Janet Mercedes Bryce, Marchioness of Milford Haven, wife of David Mountbatten, 3rd Marquess of Milford Haven.

He was the great-uncle of Clotilde de Silva y Gonzáles de Candamo (July 19, 1898 – December 12, 1978), daughter of the 10th Marquis de Arcicóllar, second wife of Hans Heinrich XV von Hochberg, Prince of Pless, and after divorce the wife of Hans Heinrich XV's son Bolko, with two children by each husband.

Political offices
Preceded by Andrés Avelino Cáceres	Interim President (President of the Government Junta); 1895	Succeeded by Nicolás de Piérola
Preceded by Eduardo López de Romaña	President of Peru; 1903 – 1904	Succeeded by Serapio Calderón
