= Salaverry-Santa Cruz War =

Civil war in Peru

- Map of the Bolivian campaign during the conflict.
Date	1835–1836
Location	Peru
Result	Pro-Confederate victory: Execution of Felipe Salaverry; Creation of a confederate state; Start of the War of the Confederation

Belligerents
Pro-Confederation: (Liberals); Orbegosistas; Crucistas; Supported by: France; Iquicha; (Chile) Pipiolos	Anti-Confederation: (Conservatives); Salaverristas; Gamarristas; Supported by: (Argentine Confederation) Argentina; Chile; Spain; Limeños and Arequipeños

Commanders and leaders
Luis Orbegoso; José Morán; Anselmo Quiroz; Blas Cerdeña (WIA); Andres de Santa Cruz; José Velasco; Otto Braun; Francisco O'Connor; José Ballivián (WIA); Antonio Molina (surrendered); Gaspar Aramayo †; Francisco Anglada †; Justo Calderón †	Felipe Salaverry (executed); José Quiroga; Manuel Vivanco; Manuel Mendiburu; Agustín Gamarra; Carlos del Postigo; Juan Eléspuru; Juan Fernandini (executed)

Strength
5,000	3,500 (Salaverry's forces); 12,000 (Gamarra's forces)

The Salaverry-Santa Cruz War, sometimes called the Peruvian Civil War of 1835–1836, was an internal conflict in Peru with the involvement of the Bolivian army of Andres de Santa Cruz. It ended with the defeat and execution of Felipe Santiago Salaverry and the creation of the Peru–Bolivian Confederation.

== Context ==
In 1834, a civil war had been fought between Pedro Pablo Bermúdez and Agustín Gamarra on the one hand against Luis José de Orbegoso and Felipe Salaverry on the other hand. The war was won by the constitutional President Luis José de Orbegoso.

In 1835, while President Luis Orbegoso was travelling to the south, his former ally General Felipe Salaverry proclaimed himself Supreme Head of the Republic on 23 February 1835, deposing Orbegoso. Orbegoso fled to Bolivia and asked Andrés de Santa Cruz, president of Bolivia, for his support to overthrow the Salaverry government.
Santa Cruz was alarmed by Salaverry's coup, who also received the support of his former enemy General Agustín Gamarra. Santa Cruz agreed to invade Peru to overthrow them, since Orbegoso would not be able to confront Salaverry and Gamarra alone.

== Battles ==
There were 4 major battles in this war:

- The Battle of Yanacocha (13 August 1835), where Santa Cruz defeated Agustín Gamarra and Santa Cruz's army lost 211 men and 71 wounded, while Gamarra's army lost 400 men and 985 taken prisoner.
- The Capture of Cobija on 24 September, where Felipe Salaverry conquered the Bolivian port.
- The Battle of Uchumayo (Arequipa) on 4 February 1836, where Salaverry defeated Santa Cruz and Santa Cruz's army lost 315 men.
- The Battle of Socabaya on 7 February 1836, where Santa Cruz defeated Salaverry in one of the bloodiest battles in the history of Peru. In this battle Salaverry, self-proclaimed President of Peru, was taken prisoner and shot in the plaza of Arequipa.

== Consequences ==
After the civil war was won, Santa Cruz and Orbegoso merged their two countries into the Peru–Bolivian Confederation. This alarmed neighboring countries Chile and Argentina and led to the War of the Confederation and Tarija War. After defeat in War of the Confederation and growing internal resistance by Conservative factions in Peru, the Peru–Bolivian Confederation was dissolved in 1839.

== See also ==
- Bolivia–Peru relations

== Bibliography ==
- Colección de documentos y de sucessos notables en las campañas de pacificación del Perú
- Historia de Bolivia, 5º edición, editorial Gisbert.
- http://www.cervantesvirtual.com/servlet/SirveObras/01316119700682055644802/p0000003.htm
- Basadre, Jorge. La Iniciación de la república: contribución al estudio de la evolución política y social del Perú. Lima: UNMSM, Fondo Editorial, 2002. ISBN 9972-46-196-3
- Basadre, Jorge: Historia de la República del Perú. 1822 - 1933, Octava Edición, corregida y aumentada. Tomos 1 y 2. Editada por el Diario "La República" de Lima y la Universidad "Ricardo Palma". Impreso en Santiago de Chile, 1998.
