= Coat of arms of Callao =

Coat of arms of Callao.

The Coat of arms of Callao was adopted in 1953 and has its origin in the medal awarded to the participants in the Siege of Callao in 1826. On the shield is a tower with the flag of Peru flying over it, the sea in the background and a radiant sun at the top. The official shield in the lower part shows the legend: "La Fiel y Generosa Ciudad del Callao, Asilo de las Leyes y de la Libertad" (The Faithful and Generous City of Callao, Asylum of Laws and Freedom), however in its simplest representation this text is replaced by the word "Callao".

== Origins ==
On February 1, 1826, the Governing Council formed by Marshal José de La Mar, José de Larrea y Loredo, Hipólito Unanue and Juan Salazar issued a decree granting honors to the members of the army who participated during the Siege of Callao. The generals and officers were awarded a gold medal, while for the rest of the troop it was of silver. The medal had an oval shape, with a turret in the center and a Peruvian flag on it. Around it was engraved with the inscription "Toma del Callao, 1826" (Siege of Callao, 1826).

The text of the lower part has its origin in 1834, when the newly elected president Luis José de Orbegoso, suspecting a coup d'etat by ex-president Agustín Gamarra, decides to take refuge in the Real Felipe Fortress. Gamarra gives the coup in Lima proclaiming General Pedro Pablo Bermúdez as Provisional Supreme Chief after which the latter marched with his forces to Callao to capture Orbegoso. However, the villagers opposed the coup leaders who, after several hours of struggle, decided to withdraw. In recognition of the behavior of its inhabitants, in the session of the National Convention of March 7, 1834, President Orbegoso granted Callao the title of ""La Fiel y Generosa Ciudad del Callao, Asilo de las Leyes y de la Libertad" (The Faithful and Generous City of Callao, Asylum of Laws and Freedom), promulgating the decree confirming it the next day.
