= Jesús López =

Jesús López may refer to:

- Jesús López Cobos (1940–2018), Spanish conductor
- Jesús López de Lara (1892–?), Spanish fencer
- Jesús López Pacheco (1930–1997), novelist, translator, poet and professor of Spanish
- Jesús López (weightlifter) (born 1984), Venezuelan weightlifter
- Jesús Alberto López (1994–2023), Costa Rican footballer
- Jesús Francisco López (born 1997), Mexican footballer
- Jesús Tonatiú López (born 1997), Mexican athlete
