= Capture of Cobija =

Peruvian occupation of Cobija
- Part of Salaverry-Santa Cruz War
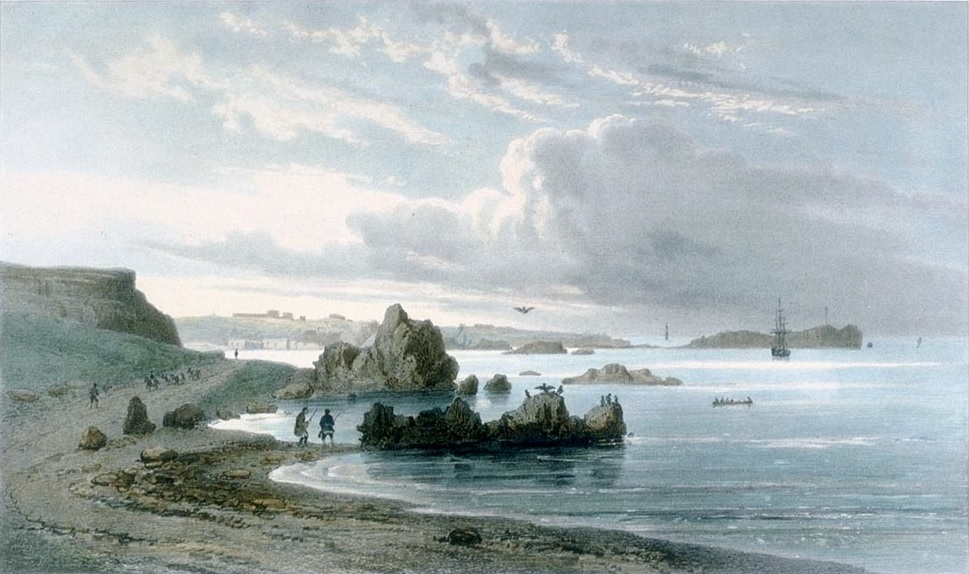
- Port of Cobija, Bolivia
Date	September 24, 1835
Location	Cobija, Bolivia
Result	Peruvian victory: Peru obtains Cobija until 1836
Territorial changes	Peruvian occupation of Cobija

Belligerents
Bolivia	Peru

Commanders and leaders
Gaspar Aramayo †; Antonio Molina (surrendered)	José Quiroga

Units involved
Bolivian Army	Peruvian Army; Peruvian Navy

Strength
87 men	260 men

Casualties and losses
- 87 (including civilians) (executed) / (surrendered); 20 (executed) / (WIA)

The Capture of Cobija or Peruvian occupation of Cobija was a war action that occurred within the framework of the Salaverry-Santa Cruz War that took place in the Bolivian port of Cobija between the Peruvian expedition of Colonel José Quiroga and the garrison under the command of Colonel Gaspar Aramayo.

== Background ==
After the declaration of the "war to the death" from Salaverry to Santa Cruz on July 8, 1835, the self-proclaimed supreme leader of Peru ordered the start of hostilities by ordering Colonel Quiroga to surprise the Bolivian port of Cobija. Quiroga, in command of 260 soldiers from the 1st battalion of Carabineros de la Guardia, embarked on the corvette "Libertad" and the schooner "Limeña", left the port of Callao on September 4, 1835, arriving on the Bolivian coast 18 days later and disembarking his ship. troops in the bay of Mejillones, 16 leagues south of Cobija.

== The Battle ==
After two days of marching through sandbanks and gorges, the Peruvian troops appeared in sight of the port garrison made up of 87 soldiers and militiamen and which also had a fort defended by 18 artillery pieces of various calibers. Quiroga ordered his men to advance as a guerrilla towards the Bolivian positions, ordering not to fire a shot until they reached 100 paces from the Bolivian positions, the left wing led by Sergeant Major Andrade and the right by Captain Salaverry (brother of the supreme chief). The restorers advanced to the ordered distance under the cannon and rifle fire directed at them by the defenders, subsequently holding a lively shootout for two hours in which the leader of the square, Colonel Gaspar Aramayo, a lieutenant and 9 soldiers were killed. another 8 wounded, their leader fallen and understanding the futility of continuing to resist, the garrison surrendered, sending the citizen-soldier Antonio Molina as a parliamentarian to communicate the surrender of the square after which the batteries, the port and the city fell into the power of the Peruvians who had 11 dead and 18 wounded during the action. According to the Peruvian historian Manuel Nemesio Vargas, Aramayo would not have defeated Quiroga alive.
