= Pacheco =

- Origin: Spain, Portugal

Pacheco is a Portuguese and Spanish surname deriving from the Latin Paccieaus as well as the Basque Patxi, a variation of Francisco. The 'Chronicle of Spanish war', by Julius Caesar, cited he had interviews with someone called 'Pacieco', well known in the region. Today, inhabitants of Badajoz are called 'pacenses'.

Notable people with the name include:

== Arts and entertainment ==
- Alexis Mateo Pacheco (born 1979), Puerto Rican drag queen
- Ana Maria Pacheco (born 1943), Brazilian artist
- Arturo Pacheco Altamirano (1903–1978), Chilean painter
- Carlos Pacheco (1962–2022), Spanish comic book artist
- Fernando Castro Pacheco (1918–2013), Mexican painter
- Fernando González Pacheco (1932–2014), Colombian television presenter
- Francisco Pacheco (1564–1644), Spanish painter and writer on art theory
- Francisco Pacheco (born 1955), Venezuelan singer
- Ivo Pacheco (born 1989), Portuguese musician known professionally as IVVVO
- Johnny Pacheco (1935–2021), Dominican musician, composer, producer and bandleader. Creator of Fania All-Stars. Coined the term "Salsa"
- María Luisa Pacheco (1919–1982), a Bolivian painter and mixed-media artist who emigrated to the United States
- "Mizzy" Pacheco (21st century), former lead singer of the American alternative rock band Against All Will
- Richard Pacheco (born 1948), American pornographic actor, real name Howie Gordon
- Tom Pacheco, (born 1946) American singer and songwriter
- Joaquín Monserrat (1921–1996), known as Pacheco, Spanish comedian and host of children programs

== Athletes ==
- Abelardo Pacheco (born 1939), Cuban long jumper
- Alex Pacheco (born 1973), Venezuelan baseball player
- Alfredo Pacheco (1982–2015), Salvadoran footballer
- Andrei Pacheco (born 1984), footballer from Trinidad and Tobago
- Antonio Pacheco (footballer, born 1976) (born 1976), Uruguayan footballer
- Augusto Pacheco Fraga (born 1988), Brazilian footballer
- Dani Pacheco (born 1991), Spanish footballer
- Darwin Pacheco (born 1976), Honduran footballer
- Edgar Pacheco (footballer, born 1977), Portuguese footballer
- Édgar Pacheco (born 1990), Mexican footballer
- Eduardo Pacheco (Brazilian footballer) (born 1987), Brazilian footballer
- Fábio Pacheco (born 1988), Portuguese footballer
- Ferdie Pacheco (1927–2017), United States boxing physician
- Freddy Pacheco (born 1998), Venezuelan baseball player
- Henrique Pacheco Lima (born 1985), Brazilian footballer
- Irene Pacheco (born 1971), Colombian boxer
- Isadora Pacheco (born 2005), Brazilian skateboarder
- Isiah Pacheco (born 1999), American football player
- Izaac Pacheco (born 2002), American baseball player
- Jaime Pacheco (born 1958), Portuguese football manager
- Larissa Pacheco (born 1994), Brazilian mixed martial arts fighter
- Maz Pacheco (born 1998), English footballer
- Nilton Pacheco (1920–2013), Brazilian basketball player
- Raúl Pacheco (born 1979), Peruvian long-distance runner
- Rodrigo Pacheco (badminton) (born 1983), Peruvian badminton player
- Rommel Pacheco (born 1986), Mexican diver
- Tony Pacheco (1927–1987), American baseball scout
- Tony Pacheco (rugby), American rugby coach
- Víctor Pacheco (footballer, born 1974) (born 1974), Colombian footballer
- Vinícius Pacheco (born 1985), Brazilian footballer

== General ==
- Alejandro Pacheco (born 1972), Venezuelan sports commentator
- Alex Pacheco (activist) (born 1958), animal rights activist, co-founder of PETA
- Alonso Pacheco (fl. 1540s), Spanish conquistador in Yucatan
- Ángel Pacheco (general) (1793–1869), Argentine military officer who later became one of the top commanders in the Confederacy during the dictatorship of Juan Manuel de Rosas
- Bernardo de Miera y Pacheco (1713–1785), Spanish cartographer and artist
- Cosme Pacheco (c.1803–c.1851), Peruvian cavalry officer, in military campaigns for the independence of Peru, 1821–1825
- Duarte Pacheco Pereira (c. 1460–1533), Portuguese sea captain, soldier, explorer and cartographer
- José Francisco Pacheco (born 1951), Portuguese educator
- Juan Manuel Fernández Pacheco (1650–1725), Spanish aristocrat, politician, academician and general
- María Pacheco Padilla (c. 1496–1531), Spanish military defender of the city of Toledo
- Melchor Pacheco (fl. 1540s), Spanish conquistador in Yucatan
- Rafael Pacheco (born 1954), Spanish astronomer
- Rodrigo Pacheco, 3rd Marquess of Cerralvo (c. 1565–1652), Spanish nobleman, inquisitor of Valladolid, and viceroy

== Politicians ==
- Abel Pacheco (born 1933), Costa Rican politician and former President
- Abel Pacheco Junior (born 1987), American politician
- Bob Pacheco (born 1934), American politician
- Don Juan Salvio Pacheco II (1793–1876), Californio politician, ranchero, and soldier.
  Pacheco, California is named after him.
- Gregorio Pacheco (1823–1899), Bolivian politician and former President
- Ivonne Ortega Pacheco (born 1972), Mexican politician
- Jorge Pacheco Areco (1920–1998), Uruguayan politician and former President
- José Andrés Pacheco de Melo (1779–c. 1820), Argentine statesman and priest
- José Condungua Pacheco (born 1958), Mozambican politician
- José Pacheco Pereira (born 1949), Portuguese politician and historian
- Juan Pacheco (1419–1474), Castilian noble
- Lopo Fernandes Pacheco (died 1349), Portuguese noble
- Luisa Teresa Pacheco (died 2023), Venezuelan politician
- Marc Pacheco (born 1952), American politician
- Nick Pacheco (born 1964), American politician
- Rod Pacheco (born 1958), American politician
- Romualdo Pacheco (1831–1899), American politician
- Rubén Pacheco (Costa Rica), Costa Rican politician
- Víctor Cervera Pacheco (1936–2004), Mexican politician

== Writers ==
- Agustín Díaz Pacheco (born 1952), Spanish writer
- Cristina Pacheco (1941–2023), Mexican journalist, writer and television personality
- Ibéyise Pacheco (born 1961), Venezuelan journalist and writer
- Jesús López Pacheco (1930–1997), Spanish-Canadian writer
- José Emilio Pacheco (1939–2014), was a Mexican poet, essayist, novelist and short story writer
- Luis Pacheco de Narváez (1570–1640), Spanish writer on fencing
- Luiz Pacheco (1925–2008), Portuguese writer, publisher, polemicist and literary critic
- Raquel Pacheco (born 1984), Brazilian writer
