= Pacheco Pereira =

Pacheco Pereira is Portuguese surname. Notable people with the surname include:

- Duarte Pacheco Pereira (c. 1460-1533), Portuguese sea captain, explorer and cartographer
- José Pacheco Pereira (born 1949), Portuguese historian, professor and political analyst

== See also ==
- Pacheco
- Pereira (surname)
