= Cosme Pacheco =

Peruvian lieutenant colonel

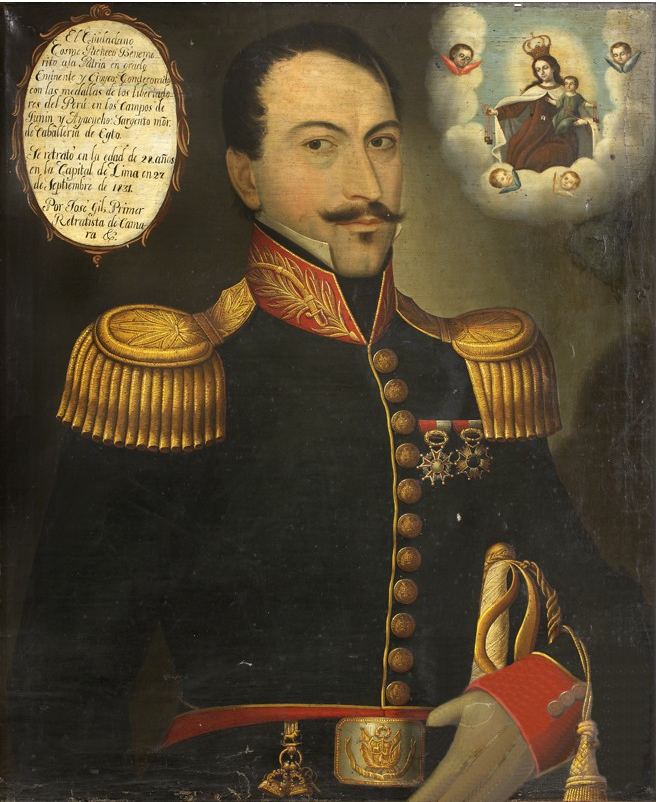
- Portrait by Jose Gil de Castro in 1831 (stating 28 years of age in the upper left inscription)

Personal details
- Born: c. 1803, 1804 Villa Quiquijana, Viceroyalty of Peru
- Died: c. 1851 Cusco
- Resting place: General Cemetery of La Almudena
- Spouse(s): Juana Gamboa; Manuela Arrambide
- Children: Nicanor Pacheco Gamboa; Fernando Pacheco Arrambide; Justina Pacheco Arrambide; Feliciano Pacheco Arrambide
- Occupation: Military, Sub-Prefect

Military service
- Allegiance: Peru
- Branch/service: Army of Peru
- Rank: Lieutenant Colonel
- Battles/wars: Independence of Peru; Peruvian Civil War of 1834

Cosme Pacheco (c. 1803 – c. 1851) was a Peruvian lieutenant-colonel during the Peruvian War of Independence and revolutionary wars in Perú. He was assigned to the cavalry of the Army of Peru in the Regiments of Hussars of Junín Province and the Lancers of Cusco. He participated in the military campaigns for the independence of Peru from 1821 to 1825. He was awarded the medals of the Battle of Junin and the Battle of Ayacucho. Later, he fought in military campaigns of the south of Peru and the Upper Peru, as well as in the Peruvian-Bolivian conflict, between 1825 and 1828. Retired from active military service, he was recalled to service in 1835 by the request of the Supreme Provisory Board of Government of the Republic of Peru. He actively participated in revolutions and civil wars in his country, collaborating with the highest authorities as emissary and peacemaker in the central highlands of Peru. He died in the region of his birth, Department of Cusco, of unknown causes, presumably around 1851.

== Biography ==
No records to document Pacheco's dates of birth and death are known to exist. He is believed to have been born in Quiquijana, Cusco region around 1803–1804. There is an inscription on the only known portrait of Pacheco, painted by Jose Gil de Castro stating the date – September 27, 1831 – and describing Pacheco as 28 years of age at that date. He spent most of his life and died in Cusco.

As per one transcription of his service record of 1924 (in Spanish), he joined the Liberating Army of the Andes as a second-lieutenant, on January 2, 1821. He was initially deployed to the Abtao Squad for little more than 2 months and then as an escort of the Prefect of the City of Lima, General José de la Riva Agüero for 1 year and 7 months. On November 1, 1821, he was promoted to the rank of Lieutenant and incorporated into the First Squad of the Regiment of Hussars of Peru, renamed Hussars of Junín after the heroic Battle of Junin. In the same squad, he coincided with its commander, Lieutenant Colonel Manuel Isidoro Suarez; Jose Razuri, who was the Assistant Major; and the then Captain Domingo Nieto, who were among the officers.

In the Battle of Junin, it is the First Squad that triggered the reversal of an imminent defeat. Initially overwhelming the patriots, the royalists, led by General Jose de Canterac himself, charged the cavalry of the Liberating Army of the Andes unprepared and misplaced in the battlefield, crushing the squads of Grenadiers and the Hussars of Colombia, wounding and capturing Manuel Necochea, general in command of the whole patriot cavalry force. The Spanish began to celebrate what seemed their inevitable victory. The First Squad of Hussars of Peru had not yet entered into battle due to its position in the battlefield, next to a ravine they had crossed, waiting for orders behind a hill and unnoticed by the royalists. At the order of Lieutenant Colonel Suarez, Lieutenant Pacheco, along with the whole squad, charged the exposed rear of the Spanish cavalry as they were clashing with the disorderly patriot's cavalry. The assault of the First Squad was due to a false order of attack against the royalists, purportedly given by General Jose de La Mar and communicated by Major Razuri to Lieutenant Colonel Suarez. The charge of First Squad of the Hussars of Peru took the Spanish, fully dispersed, completely by surprise, resulting in confusion by the royalists, trapped now in between patriot cavalry squads. The attack also prompted the return to the melee of the bulk of the patriot's cavalry, under the command of General Guillermo Miller, causing a crushing defeat of the royalists in the battlefield of Junin. Bolivar's recognition to the courage of the Hussars of Peru was its renaming to Hussars of Junin,

On December 3, 1824, six days before the Battle of Ayacucho, Cosme Pacheco was promoted to the rank of captain. The First Squad of the renamed Hussars of Junin participated in the patriot's victory against the Spanish forces commanded by Viceroy Jose de la Serna, who after the battle where he was gravely wounded, capitulated the Spanish sovereignty in Peru, allowing his return to Spain. Despite the heroic participation of many pro-independence Peruvians in both battles, which ended the Spanish domain in Peru and in South America, there was no immediate recognition. It was not until September 18, 1829 that the Government of Peru, headed by Agustín Gamarra, issues a decree recognizing Pacheco's contribution to the cause of independence, along with all Peruvians who fought at the Battle of Junín.

(translated from Spanish)

THE CITIZEN AGUSTIN GAMARRA

GREAT MARSHAL OF THE NATIONAL ARMIES AND PRESIDENT PROVISIONAL OF THE REPUBLIC

Owing to transmit to the remote generations of the great american family, the memory of the champions of their freedom, who amidst uncertainty, facing dangers and deprivations, prefixed [sic] in the fields of Junin, on August 6, 1824, the future fate of the New World, in accordance with the power granted by the General Constituent Congress, in its decree of March 29, and of which consequently the government issued on September 18 of last year, designating the gold medal with which the braves who attended that memorable day must be distinguished: I have come to grant the use of it, to the Captain of the Cavalry Don Cosme Pacheco, to carry it with him, and display it with noble pride, which had the glory of destroying the main force of the Spanish army, and the prestige on which it supported its domination.

— Angel Vega Enriquez

Cosme Pacheco requested his discharge from the Hussars of Junin on 10 September 1825. He went to be part of the Fourth Company of the Lancers Squad of Cusco, becoming its Captain on December 17, 1828. On August 8, 1831, he was promoted to the rank of Sergeant Major of Cavalry. His service record reports 11 years, 4 months and 4 days until May 12, 1832. During the Peruvian Civil War of 1834 he served in the side of President Luis Jose de Orbegoso, under the orders of General Guillermo Miller. In such confrontation, he had a distinguished participation in the Battle of Huaylacucho in the Province of Huancavelica, on April 17, 1834. In the battle, Sergeant Major Pacheco was in command of a detachment of 12 lancers. By direct order of General Miller, he was in charge of protecting the troops and preventing ammunition from falling into the hands of the enemy, commanded by General Jose Rufino Echenique. This is registered in the reports of General Francisco de Paula Otero.

(translated from Spanish)

The reports issued in terms of praise for the appellant, deal with the fact that at the time when our entire army had dispersed, he found himself in the vicinity of the town, guarding the entire park with twelve lancers entrusted to him, having prevented without other support, of having fallen into the hands of the enemy. Likewise, under this circumstance, the defended ammunition served to support the troops that were in the last position, without supplies, having on the contrary managed to reunite the dispersed troops that were wandering, with which a battalion was reconstituted and resisted the charge of the enemy, and protected the other companies that were believed lost...

[omitted paragraphs]

...stating that by order of General Miller, the appellant covered the rearguard of our army, which was already retreating orderly, towards the town of Huando, avoiding the danger that threatened, and having delivered the picket that he entrusted to him, on the heights of Huailacuchu[sic].

— Angel Vega Enriquez

He subsequently collaborated with General Domingo Nieto in his work as a peacemaker during the political-military riots that occurred in Peru between 1830 and 1850. It is likely that, from their campaigns of the Hussars of Junin, Cosme Pacheco, as lieutenant, would have formed a friendly relationship with the then Captain Nieto, under whose orders he had served, according to the chain of command. Counting then with his full confidence, at the beginning of 1834 he was emissary for the then General Nieto before the Provisional President of Peru, Luis José de Orbegoso, to deliver on Nieto's defense plans for the Province of Ayacucho, then caught in military uprisings like the rest of the country. In the letter that General Nieto addresses to President Luis José de Orbegoso, he expresses the disposition of the Commander Pacheco on the pacifying cause.

(translated from Spanish)

Your Excellency Mister Provisional President of the Republic

January 14, 1834

Your Excellency,

[omitted paragraphs]

As for the department of Ayacucho, recent events have made us aware that there are free men and even patriotic soldiers who look with pain at the ignominious conduct of their comrades in arms. Your Excellency will see by this quick communication my defense plan, which in its entirety I cannot communicate to Your Excellency due to the need not to entrust it to paper until having secure communications of Your Excellence. Commander Pacheco, of all my trust, is the one who carries this communication, and this active and heroic soldier will provide Your Excellency with more extensive verbal reports on all these events.

[omitted paragraphs]

Domingo Nieto

— Carmen McEvoy

He was reinstated to service as Lieutenant Colonel, effective as of July 15, 1835. The reinstatement is given at the request of the Supreme Provisional Government Board of the Republic of Peru, chaired by Luis José de Orbegoso himself.

(translated from Spanish)

PERUVIAN REPUBLIC

THE SUPREME BOARD OF PROVISORY GOVERNMENT OF THE REPUBLIC

Based on the merit and services of Lieutenant Colonel of Cavalry D. Cosme Pacheco.

On behalf of the Supreme National Executive Power, it has come [sic] to revalidate the dispatch of such Lieutenant Colonel as effective in the same armed force, as called back to service, and dated July 15, 1835. Therefore: orders and commands to recognize him as such, keeping him and making him keep [sic] all the distinctions and pre-eminences that correspond to him by this title. For which the present is issued, signed

[illegible signature]

— Angel Vega Enriquez

His collaboration and friendship with General Nieto lasted for more than a decade, always from his base in the provinces of the central highlands of Peru. There is correspondence that General Nieto addressed to him personally, where issues of pacification of that part of the country are discussed in times of political and military instability. A letter, dated November 1844, offers some information on the work he was doing then, apparently in permanent retirement from the military. From what the transcriber of the letter states, it would be incomplete and there is only what appears to be the last page of the letter.

(translated from Spanish)

[written at the top of the page "Continuation"]

[paragraphs presumably missing]

Mr. Don Cosme Pacheco

November 1842

Yes, my friend, we have worked for the country as soldiers, it remains for us to do it as good citizens. You, like us, are also obliged on your part to ensure the maintenance of order and tranquility, without which we will have done nothing but suffer without reporting the only desirable advantage: the real good of Peru.

Once these departments are arranged, I think I will go by those: we will see each other there, and in the meantime, stay good and command your friend.

Domingo Nieto

— Carmen McEvoy

For an indeterminate period of time, probably from the time of the last correspondence with Domingo Nieto and prior to his death, Cosme Pacheco served as Sub-Prefect of the Province of Cotabambas in what is now the Department of Apurímac in the central highlands of Peru. He died on an unknown date, presumably around 1851. The latter can be inferred by the legislative decree acknowledging the license of previous marriage, issued by the Congress of the Republic of Peru on October 3, 1851, in favour of his widow, Manuela Arrambide, to be benefited with a survivor's pension. Cosme Pacheco was buried with military honors in the General Cemetery of Almudena in Cusco.

At the beginning of 1953, there were initiatives to recognize his participation in both the Peruvian War of Independence and the initiation of the Republic of Peru. On January 2, the Senate debated the proposal by the Municipality of Cusco, requesting the Peruvian Ministry of War to relocate Cosme Pacheco's remains to the Pantheon of the Heroes in Lima. On January 22 of the same year, a request by Francisco Tamayo, Senator for the Department of Cusco, was debated. The initiative sought to recognize Cosme Pacheco as a Hero of the Independence of Peru.

== Campaigns and battles ==
- Campaign of Ica in 1822 with General Domingo Tristán.
- Battle of Mamacona, April 7, 1822 .
- Intermediate Campaign in 1823 with General Guillermo Miller.
- Campaign of the South in 1823 with General Antonio José de Sucre.
- Surprise of Azapa in Arica on June 16, 1823.
- Campaigns of the United Liberation Army of Peru in 1824, also with General Antonio José de Sucre.
- Battle of Junin, on August 6, 1824.
- Battle of Ayacucho, December 9, 1824.
- Campaign of Upper Peru in 1825 under superior orders.
- Campaign of Bolivia in 1828 with General Agustín Gamarra.
- Battle of Huaylacucho in Huancavelica, on April 17, 1834.

== Distinctions ==
- Medal of Junin.
- Medal of Ayacucho.
- Recognition of sacrifice and courage, Agustín Gamarra, Provisional President of Peru.

== See also ==
- Independence of Peru
- Battle of Junin
- Battle of Ayacucho
