= Peruvian Civil War of 1834 =

Civil war in Peru

First Peruvian Civil War
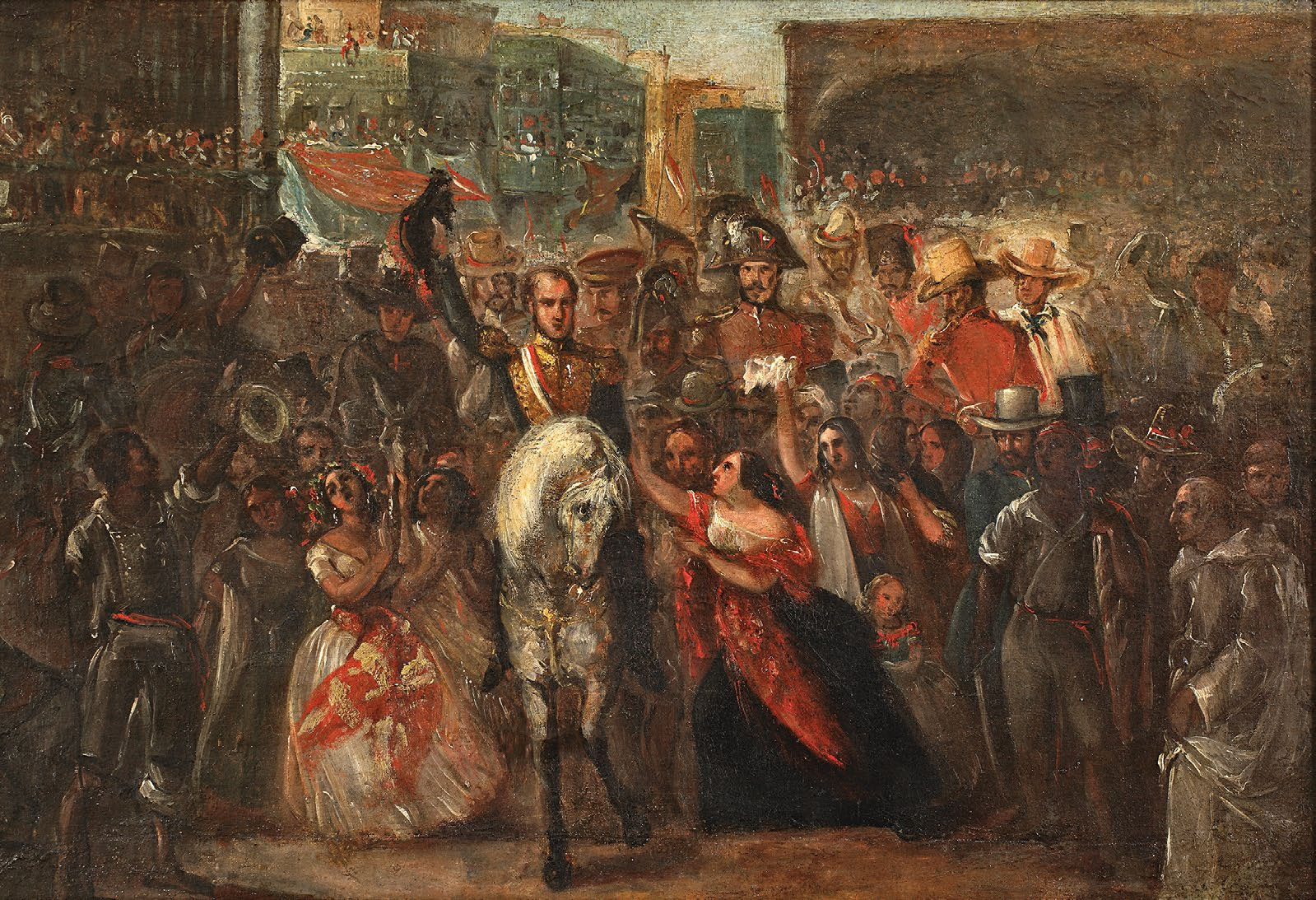
- Orbegoso enters Lima, 1842 painting by Ignacio Merino
Date	January 3, 1834 - April 24, 1834
Location	Peru
Result	Revolutionaries defeated: Reconciliation of government forces and the Bermudist rebels.

Belligerents
Government of Peru	Revolutionaries; Supported by: Bolivia

Commanders and leaders
Luis José de Orbegoso; Guillermo Miller; Felipe Santiago Salaverry	Pedro Bermudez; José Rufino Echenique

The Peruvian Civil War of 1834 was a revolt by supporters of former president Agustín Gamarra against the government. Gamarra had wanted Pedro Pablo Bermúdez as his successor to the presidency instead of Luis José de Orbegoso. On April 17, 1834, the two sides clashed in the Battle of Huaylacucho, in Huancavelica resulting in a victory for the revolutionaries. On April 24, 1834, there was another clash near Jauja. Although the revolutionaries surrendered, Orbegoso was overthrown the next year by his subordinate Felipe Santiago Salaverry, sparking the Salaverry-Santa Cruz War.

The Peruvian Civil War of 1834, also known as the Bermúdez Revolution, was a conflict that began in Peru after the election of General Luis José de Orbegoso as the country’s provisional president. Former president and General Agustín Gamarra, unhappy with election results, incited General Pedro Bermúdez to stir up a rebellion against the new government. The rebellion began in January 1834. The people divided themselves into two factions: the Bermudistas and the Orbegosistas. After several months of fighting on different fronts, the factions peacefully reconciled in what is called the Embrace of Maquinhuayo. This was the first civil war in the history of Peru as a republic.

== Context ==
On December 20, 1833, the constitutional term of President Augustín Gamarra ended. Because a successor had not been chosen due to failed elections months before, the National Convention (a congress of constituents) agreed to choose a provisional president. Gamarra and the conservatives supported candidate General Pedro Bermúdez, while the liberals that dominated the assembly supported General Luis José de Orbegoso, a less authoritarian soldier. Francisco Xavier de Luna Pizarro, the famous liberal clergyman who presided over the assembly, was like a son to Orbegoso. The other candidate was General Domingo Nieto. The voting was carried out in the midst of the Convention, where Orbegoso received 47 votes, Bermúdez received 37, and Nieto received only one.

Orbegoso assumed power on 21 December 1833, counting on the approval of the city. His ascension to power meant the end of Gamarra’s government, which had been worn down because of his authoritarian beliefs. However, the supporters of Gamarra, who continued to control key positions of power, harassed the new administration with the intention of demolishing it and placing Bermúdez as the new president. They claimed that the presidency of Orbegoso was illegal because it was not the National Convention’s place to select the president.

== Bermudez's coup-d'état ==
Fearing a coup, Orbegoso decided to take refuge in the Real Felipe Fortress in Callao, on January 3, 1834. There, he installed the seat of his government and began to relieve the Gamarristas of high command of the Army. In response to this action, the Lima garrison revolted the next day and proclaimed Bermúdez Supreme Chief. Immediately afterwards, the Bermudist troops besieged the fortress of Callao.

At national level, Bermúdez's authority was obeyed by some garrisons. However, his army began suffering desertions, even more so when news arrived from Arequipa - the most important city in Peru after Lima - that they were in favor of Orbegoso.

== Lima's intervention ==
Lima was against the coup as well. Many daily activities were suspended as a result of it, public shows stopped working and numerous shops closed their doors. During the night, many citizens went to Callao to aid the besieged Real Felipe.

On January 28, 1834, a part of the Bermudist forces that besieged Callao retreated to the mountains, due to the perceived unsuccessfulness of said site. Lima, fearing that Bermudists passing through the capital would indulge in looting, rose up to fight, arming themselves with stones and a few guns. There were clashes in the city's streets.

At dusk, the rest of the army that besieged Callao arrived, led by Mariscala (Gamarra's wife), who was dressed as a man. The population stood firm, repelling the Bermudist attack. According to the historian Basadre, it was the first time in Peruvian history that the people in Lima successfully faced the Army.

Bermúdez and his supporters, seeing that there was nothing to be done in Lima, continued their march up into the mountains. On the morning of the following day, Orbegoso entered Lima triumphantly, cheered by the crowd.

== Battle Fronts of the civil war ==
This Civil War had three battle fronts:

- Southern front, located in Arequipa, where General Domingo Nieto tried to defend the constitutional order, ultimately failing.
- Northern front, where Felipe Santiago Salaverry, on Orbegoso's side, captured General Francisco de Vidal in Trujillo.
- Central Front, where Orbegoso himself marched up the mountains in search of Bermúdez and his army. This campaign would decide the final result of the war.

== The Arequipa Campaign ==
In Arequipa, General Nieto, gathered the townspeople in the Plaza de Armas. There, sobbing, according to an eyewitness, he made the people known of the Bermúdez coup and announced his desire to defend the constitutional order till the end. He assumed military command of the department, with the advice of the famous Dean Valdivia.

In Puno, General Miguel de San Román, prefect of the department, declared himself in favour of Bermúdez and began marching towards Arequipa. The Arequipans, despite poorly armed, were enthusiastic and prepared to fight.

In a first meeting in Miraflores, on April 2, Nieto defeated San Román. He was then forced to retreat to the heights of Cangallo. Nieto allowed himself to be drawn by San Román to a meeting, however, negotiations didn't come to fruition and they only served San Román to gain more time.

On April 5, Nieto attacked San Román in Cangallo, and while it seemed he was winning the fight, a counterattack from the Bermudistas changed the situation. Thus, Nieto's forces withdrew in disorder and San Román occupied Arequipa.

At that time, the feminist writer Flora Tristán was in Arequipa. She recounted the atmosphere that was lived in the city and how high society suddenly changed loyalty according to where victory seemed to be going in her book, Pilgrimages of an Outcast. Similarly, writer Mario Vargas Llosa, in his novel Paradise in the Other Corner, also recreates this episode of the Civil War. He emphasized the ridiculousness of the situation, according to his European perspective, the confrontation between tiny armies poorly armed and dressed, under the command of uneducated officers, who were constantly changing sides. He does, however, make an exception: the highly enlightened officer Clemente Althaus, from Germany.

== Central Sierra Campaign ==
Meanwhile, in Lima, the National Convention resumed its work and gave Orbegoso power to end war. On March 20, 1834, Orbegoso left command to the Supreme Delegate Manuel Salazar y Baquíjano and, at the head of a small army, marched to the central highlands, towards Jauja, in pursuit of Bermúdez. In this area, General Guillermo Miller was already facing the Bermudists.

Although Orbegoso had under his command competent officers such as José de la Riva Agüero, Mariano Necochea, Guillermo Miller, Antonio Gutiérrez de la Fuente, Blas Cerdeña, Francisco de Paula Otero and Felipe Santiago Salaverry; his forces were weak and heterogeneous.

On his side, Bermúdez, also with a small army but with disciplined veterans, undertook the withdrawal from the Jauja Valley in Ayacucho's direction to join with General Frías, prefect of the department. He did not enjoy popular support, neither did his troops feel any attachment to him, since he did not care to encourage or satisfy their needs. One of his main officers, General José Rufino Echenique, discloses in his memoirs that he agreed with Frías to depose Bermúdez once they were finished with Orbegoso. Subsequent events would modify his initial plan, but not his original idea.

After Huancayo, Bermúdez continued his march towards Ayacucho, closely followed by Miller. The vanguards of both forces met near Huancavelica. As a result of the skirmish, Miller was forced to retreat to Huaylacucho (west of Huancavelica). Concurrently, Orbegoso arrived at Jauja, and knowing that Miller was preparing for an encounter with the enemy forces, he sent two battalions to his aid.

=== Huaylacucho Battle ===
The battle of Huaylacucho was in a disadvantageous terrain for the Orbegoists. But even so, Miller arranged his line, placing the Pichincha battalion on the right, the Lima battalion in the center and the Zepita battalion (under Salaverry's command) with the cavalry squadrons commanded by Loyola on the left. In total they numbered around 1,350 men.

On the dawn of April 17, a column of Bermudists under General Frías advanced towards the vanguard of Miller's right wing. In order to halt the attack, Miller sent Commander Solar and then the Pichincha battalion as support. However, the Bermudists were able to repel the attack and took over Huaylacucho.

Subjected to incessant fire, the Orbegoists chose to withdraw. In a disorderly manner, they crossed river and many drowned. Contemplating the disaster, Salaverry advanced to the left with the Zepita battalion and managed to stop the Bermudists, facilitating the withdrawal of their own and thus saving them from complete destruction.

With the lack of the Orbegoist Cavalry's intervention, Frías thought he could win them over, as he once had been their commander, and approached them with an officer and five soldiers. However, Loyola attacked them and Frías died by a spear. Loyola then gathered and reorganized the dispersed Orbegoist troops.

The Orbegoists had suffered 50 dead and about 32 wounded, as well as 200 dispersed. Bermúdez did not pursue the Orbegosists, who regrouped and retreated to Izcuchaca (north of Huancavelica).

Although there were tactical movements, cavalry charges and a few shots, this wasn't a battle in the full sense of the word, but Peruvian history traditionally has called it so.

=== The Maquinhuayo embrace ===
The battle of Huaylacucho had little consequences. A final meeting was expected, but it was then when Echenique convinced the rest of the Bermudist officers to reach a peaceful agreement with Orbegoso, regardless of Bermúdez's opinion. The officers were aware that they were fighting for a lost cause, as they had no popular support at all and were bereft of any resources to continue the fight. Therefore, they proceeded to depose Bermúdez and sent emissaries to the Orbegoso camp.

On April 24, they reached the Maquinguayo plain, 24 km north of Jauja, where they found the Orbegoists in battle formation. After placing their weapons down, both armies advanced and clasped in a fraternal embrace. This unique episode in Peruvian history is known as the Embrace of Maquinhuayo. The Bermudists recognized the authority of Orbegoso.

== Consequences ==
With the constitutional order restored, the country abided by the legitimate authority of Orbegoso, who then returned to Lima for the second time triumphantly (May 3, 1834). Gamarra and his wife, who were in Arequipa, were surprised by a popular riot, causing them to flee on May 18.

Disguised as a clergyman, La Mariscala secretly embarked to Chile, resulting in her death at 32. On the other side, Gamarra took refuge in Bolivia, requesting refuge from President Andrés de Santa Cruz, with whom he would plot the invasion of Peru.

Pedro Pablo Bermúdez was exiled to Costa Rica.
