= Battle of Uchumayo =

Battle of Uchumayo (1836)
- Part of the Salaverry-Santa Cruz War
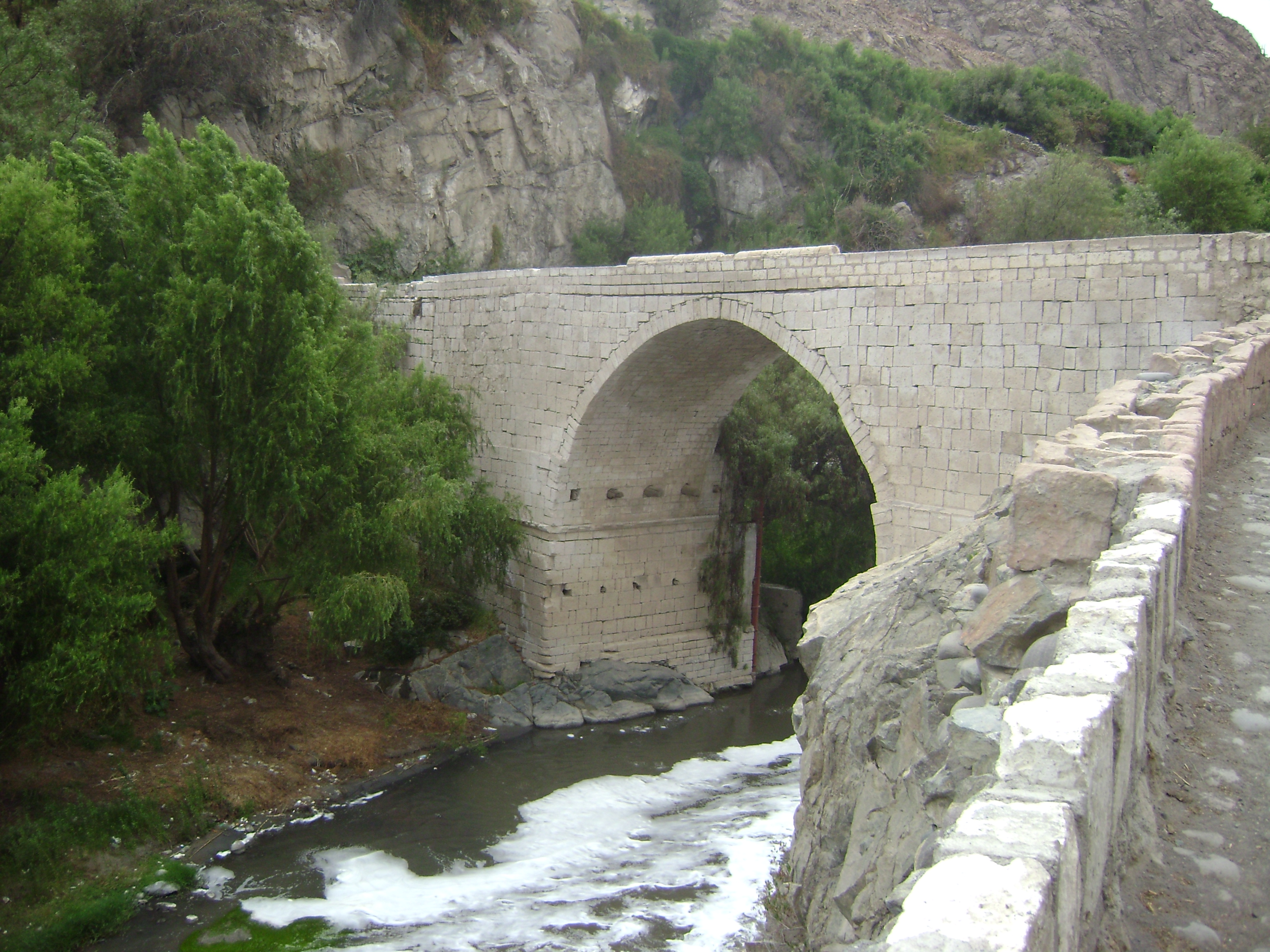
- Uchumayo Bridge, scene of the battle.
Date	February 4, 1836
Location	Uchumayo, outside of Arequipa
Result	Restorationist victory

Belligerents
Restoration Army	Pro-Confederation

Commanders and leaders
Felipe Salaverry	Andrés de Santa Cruz; José Ballivián (WIA); Blas Cerdeña (WIA); Justo Calderón †

Strength
2,000 men	+3,500 men

Casualties and losses
Minimal killed	est. 1,000: 400 killed 200 captured 300 missing 100 wounded

The Battle of Uchumayo occurred in the first days of February 1836, on the outskirts of Arequipa, Peru. It was the most important confrontation in the series of skirmishes, prior to the Battle of Socabaya, that the forces of the United Army under the command of Santa Cruz held with the restaurateurs under the command of Salaverry.

== Background ==
After hastily abandoning the city in the face of the hostility of its inhabitants and the advance of Santa Cruz, Salaverry retired to the vicinity of the town of Uchumayo where at the entrance to the bridge he had a series of parapets and trenches built in which he placed 2 pieces of artillery. protected by a considerable force of infantry.

== The battle ==
After a series of minor clashes, the United Army moved towards Uchumayo, with the vanguard led by General José Ballivián advancing. He was determined to force the enemy positions with the battalion of the Guard. Charging head-on and bare-chested, the Bolivian soldiers managed to reach the trenches, but the lack of reinforcements and the fierce resistance forced Ballivián to retreat, not without suffering heavy losses. Despite being wounded in the attack, he continued to sustain the combat, although in a very disadvantageous situation. When Santa Cruz arrived at the field with the rest of the army, he believed it was his duty to uphold the honour of his Bolivian vanguard, so he sent a column of hunters and the 1st Line battalion, which was later relieved by the 6th Line, maintaining the attack until nightfall and resuming the following day, without managing to take the trenches. Meanwhile, at 5 pm, General Anglade's division, made up of the Peruvian Zepita battalion and the 2nd Bolivian Line Battalion plus a cavalry squadron, had received orders from Santa Cruz to cross the river by the wooden bridge and attack Salaverry from the rear. However, the darkness of the night and the lack of knowledge of the terrain caused Anglade to lose direction and after some firefights with restoring parties, he had to retake the bridge at dawn on the 5th without having fulfilled his mission and losing some men, dead and taken prisoner. Faced with this, after 22 consecutive hours of fire and with the aim of getting Salaverry out of his entrenchments, Santa Cruz retreated. On the 6th he gathered his army near the La Apacheta cemetery.

== Consequences ==
The Santa Cruz vanguard, made up of the Guard battalion, had 63 soldiers killed and 89 wounded, one officer killed, First Lieutenant Justo Pastor Calderón, and 11 wounded, including General Ballivian himself, as well as a colonel, a commander, three sergeants major, a captain, two first lieutenants and two second lieutenants. The Peruvian general Blas Cerdeña was also seriously wounded by a bullet in the mouth. Overall, the casualties in the fighting on the 4th amounted to 315 dead and 284 prisoners.

Although there is no data on casualties in the Restoration army, given that it fought behind cover while its enemies advanced in the open, it is likely that these were considerably lower.

In the early hours of the following day, Bolivian Lieutenant Colonel Sagarnaga appeared at Salaverry's camp, carrying a document signed by General Brown requesting the regularization of the war on behalf of General Santa Cruz. Salaverry accepted and sent Lieutenant Colonel Guiliarte and Major Angulo, who had been taken prisoner in the battle the previous day.

Emboldened by their initial success, the restorers abandoned their positions to occupy the heights of Paucarpata, for which they had to march in front of their enemy.

After the battle, Salaverry issued the following proclamation to his troops:

"Soldados, ya teneís al frente a los esplendidos vencedores de Yanacocha y a los invasores de vuestra patria. El ejercito restaurador ha visto amanecer este día de gloria y en él recogereis los laureles debidos a los valientes.

Soldados: El puente de Uchumayo intimidó a vuestros enemigos porque en él disteis pruebas de vuestro valor, y buscandolos en su retirada les obligais a aceptar una batalla, de que quisieran alejarse. Bien pronto conoceran su impotencia y vuestro valor les arrancará los supuestos laureles que recogieron en Yanacocha.

Valientes del Ejército Restaurador: los extranjeros deben ser para vosotros menos odiosos que los habitantes de Arequipa, ese pueblo desnaturalizado que se ha convertido en vuestro más crudo enemigo, es el que mas merece vuestro rigor, yo lo entrego a vuestra venganza para que experimente todos los males que merece por su criminal obstinación.

Soldados: la gloria os llama y un hermoso botín os espera en el perfido pueblo arequipeño. En todas partes vereis a vuestro lado a vuestro general Salaverry."

== Bibliography ==
- Jorge Basadre, Historia de la República del Perú, Tomo II Crónicas del Déan Juan Gualberto Valdivia
- Manuel Bilbao, Historia de Salaverry
