= Antonio de Molina =

Spanish writer

Personal life
- Born: 1560
- Died: 21 September 1612 (aged 51–52)
- Notable work(s): Instruccion de Sacerdotes, en que se dá doctrina muy importante para conocer la alteza del sagrado oficio Sacerdotal, y para exercitarle debidamente

Religious life
- Order: Order of Augustinian Hermits; Carthusian

Antonio De Molina was a Spanish Carthusian theologian and ascetical writer.

== Biography ==
Antonio De Molina was born about 1560, at Villanueva de los Infantes. In 1575 he entered the Order of Augustinian Hermits, was elected superior at one of their houses in Spain, and for some time taught theology. But wishing to join an order of stricter discipline, he became a Carthusian at Miraflores, where he died prior of the monastery.

== Works ==
Antonio De Molina wrote in Spanish a few ascetical works, especially adapted for priests, which became the most popular books of their kind in Spain, and were translated into various foreign languages. The most famous of these is a manual for priests and bears the title: Instruccion de Sacerdotes, en que se dá doctrina muy importante para conocer la alteza del sagrado oficio Sacerdotal, y para exercitarle debidamente. Twenty editions of this work are known to have been published, among them a Latin translation by the Belgian Dominican Nicolás Janssen Boy, which received five editions (Antwerp, 1618, 1644; Cologne, 1626, 1711, and 1712), and an Italian translation (Turin, 1865). It was severely attacked by the Jansenist Antoine Arnauld (De la fréquente communion, 1643) but ably defended against him by Petavius (Dogmata theologica, De Pœnitentia, lib. III, cap. vi; new ed., Paris, 1865-7, VIII, 286-8). He is also the author of two ascetical works adapted for laymen. The one, Exercicios espirituales para personas ocupadas de cosas de su salvacion, was published at Burgos in 1613; the other, Exercicios espirituales de la excelencias, provecho y necesidad de la oracion mental, etc., was first published at Burgos in 1615, and was translated into Latin.

== Bibliography ==
- Nicolás Antonio, Bibliotheca hispana nova (Madrid, 1783-8). I, 145;
- Hugo von Hurter, Nomenclator, 3rd ed., 111, 608-9.
