= Bruno Lazaro =

Spanish film director

Bruno Lázaro (born 1957 in Madrid, Spain) (Former artistic name Bruno Lázaro Pacheco) is a Canadian-Spanish film director who has written and directed fiction, documentary and experimental films. His most critically acclaimed film is It's For You! / ¡Es para ti! (2004) premiered at the Málaga Film Festival in Spain and screened at international film festivals including Donostia-San Sebastián, Barcelona, São Paulo, and Montevideo.

It's For You! / ¡Es para ti! was described by Variety as a "A miniature techno fable about a twentysomething trying to keep a relationship alive through the healing power of the vidcam, writer-director Bruno Lázaro Pacheco's debut "It's for You!" seeks to describe a trip to the dark side of the soul. But pic works better as a straight-up take on a scruffy post-teen charmer going through a tough time".

French film critic Raphaël Jullien called it "A simple and deeply moving masterpiece!": "The feeling of authenticity is strengthened by a not inconsiderable part of improvisation – palpable and well done – that tends to compare the movie with John Cassavetes's work. "It's for you!" also seems to be a successful hybrid of theatre and cinema, an heir of a less pretentious and less eccentric underground cinema, and a declaration of love to... so many things! Bruno Lazaro Pacheco seems to enjoy an alternation of rhythms, laughs, tears... and sometimes a kind of contemplation with nearly abstract and purely aesthetic shots: plane tracks in the sky, graffiti..."

His work often explores themes of cultural duality and questions the control of the individual by the state. "My parents were political activists and leaders of the movement against the fascist Franco dictatorship in Spain in the 1960s. This struggle and the clash of cultures at an early age have definitely influenced my work." The narrative structure of his films tends towards non-linear, dream-like constructions where an impressionist portrayal of character and action provokes emotional connections to the viewer outside the usual realm of film plot tradition. In 1989, The Traveller was described as "Evokes the works of such masters of modernist existentialism as Andrei Tarkovsky and Wim Wenders." Toronto International Film Festival

== Biography ==
He completed his film studies at the Centre for the Arts at Simon Fraser University in Vancouver, British Columbia, Canada, where he studied with filmmakers Al Razutis and David Rimmer. In 1981, Bruno Lazaro was a founding member of Cineworks, an independent filmmakers' co-operative society in Vancouver, where he began making short fiction, documentary and experimental films.

His first feature, The Traveller (1989), had its premiere at the Toronto International Film Festival and participated in the presentation of Canadian Cinema at the Centre Georges Pompidou in Paris, France.

After moving to Toronto in the 1990s, he made a controversial sci-fi cult film City of Dark in 1997. In 2004, he released his first Canada-Spain co-production ¡Es para ti! / It's For You! shot both in Toronto and Barcelona.

Bruno Lazaro has been a guest programmer and jury member at international film festivals, and established the Festival of Canadian Cinema in Madrid, showcasing independent Canadian films in Spain. He is currently developing a Canada-Spain co-production with Nova Scotia producers William D. MacGillivray and Terry Greenlaw.

== Filmography ==
- Hate to Love (1982) Awarded: Chicago International Film Festival - Silver Plaque Award.
- Swingspan (1986) Awarded: Northwest Film & Video Festival, Portland (Oregon) - Best Film.
- The Traveller (1989) Premiered: Toronto International Film Festival. Produced by Raymond Massey.
- City of Dark (1997) Produced by Greg Klymkiw. Awarded: Figueira da Foz International Film Festival - Most Innovative Film Language
- It's For You! / ¡Es para ti! (2004) Awarded: Lyon Festival of New Generation Cinema - Best Film Award. Biennale du cinema in Annecy - Grand prix
- There Are No Outdoor Ice Rinks In Madrid (2021) DOXA Documentary Film Festival. Ronda International Film Festival. Festival Internacional de Cine de Las Palmas de Gran Canaria
- See You Soon Love Always (2012) A short experimental film in collaboration with composer Anthony Ocaña and premiered at the Gijón International Film Festival (2012)
