= José Quiroga =

José Quiroga may refer to:

- José Manuel Quiroga Sarmiento (1777-1852), Argentine priest
- José Quiroga (cardiologist) (1902-1991), Chilean cardiologist
- José Quiroga Suárez (1920-2006), Spanish politician
- José Quiroga (footballer) (born 1986), Argentine footballer
