= Jesús López Pacheco =

Jesús López Pacheco (1930 in Madrid, Spain – April 6, 1997 in Toronto, Canada) was a novelist, translator, poet and professor of Spanish.

López Pacheco studied philosophy and arts (Romance languages) at the University of Madrid. His communist sympathies soon became evident and he participated in the fledgling anti-Franco student protests.

López Pacheco first published collections of poetry: Dejad crecer este Silencio (Premio Adonais 1953), Mi corazón se llama Cudillero (1961), Pongo la mano sobre España (1961) Canciones del amor prohibido (1961).

His 1958 his novel Central Eléctrica discussed progress, workers and social injustice. It was short listed for the Premio Nadal.

López Pacheco left Spain in 1968, accepting a one-year position at the University of Western Ontario in London, Ontario. He would stay there until his retirement in 1994, when he moved to Toronto. He was a professor emeritus at the time of his death.

In London he would translate works of English and American poets, as well as publish his own poetry (Delitos contra la Esperanza (1970)), another novel (La hoja de parra (1977)), a short story anthology (Lucha contra el Murciélago (1990)), and a play (Máquina contra la Soledad o la Scherezada electrónica (1989)). His Asilo poético: poemas escritos en Canadá 1968–1990 (1991) discussed his political self-exile. Finally, he published Ecólogas y urbanas, manual para evitar un fin de siglo siniestro in 1996.

== Family ==
López Pacheco married María de la Soledad (Marisol) Lázaro Morán. The couple had three children: Bruno Lazaro, a Canadian-Spanish film director, Alexandra Lopez-Pacheco (born in 1960), a freelance journalist and partner in a Canadian-based writing and editing firm called Words Matter, and Fabio Lopez Lazaro, a university history professor, who has taught in Canada and the United States.

== Selected bibliography ==
- López Pacheco, Jesús (1953). Dejad crecer este silencio. Ediciones Rialp, Madrid.
- López Pacheco, Jesús (1958). Central eléctrica. Ediciones Destino, Barcelona.
- López Pacheco, Jesús (1961). Mi corazón se llama Cudillero. El Ventanal, Mieres.
- Marcos, Ana; Quesada, Luis Alberto; López Pacheco, Jesús (1961). España a tres voces. Ediciones Horizonte, Buenos Aires.
- López Pacheco, Jesús (1961). Pongo la mano sobre España.
- López Pacheco, Jesús (1961). Canciones del amor prohibido. Literaturasa, Barcelona.
- López Pacheco, Jesús (1970). Algunos aspectos del orden público en el momento actual de la histeria de España. Mexica Era.
- López Pacheco, Jesús (1973). La hoja de parra. J. Mortiz, Mexico City.
- López Pacheco, Jesús (1980). Lucha por la respiración y otros ejercicios narrativos. Ediciones Destino, Barcelona.
- López Pacheco, Jesús (1992). Asilo poético : poemas escritos en Canadá, 1968–90. Ediciones Endymión, Madrid. ISBN 84-7731-125-0.
- López Pacheco, Jesús (1996). Ecólogas y urbanas : manual para evitar un fin de siglo siniestro : versos, acciones, prosas, refranes, juegos y muchas otras cosas. Ediciones Bassarai. ISBN 84-921282-4-0.
- López Pacheco, Jesús (1982). Central eléctrica (reprint ed.). Ediciones Destino, Barcelona. ISBN 84-233-1236-4.
- López Pacheco, Jesús (1997). La hoja de parra (reprint ed.). Bruguera, Barcelona. ISBN 84-02-05427-7.
- López Pacheco, Jesús (2002). El homóvil o la desorbitación : libro de maquinerías: polinovela multinacional. Editorial Debate, Madrid. ISBN 84-8306-952-0. (posthumous)
- López Pacheco, Jesús (2002). El tiempo de mi vida : antología. Alzira, Valencia. ISBN 84-89847-87-8. (posthumous)
