= Usquil District =

Usquil
- District
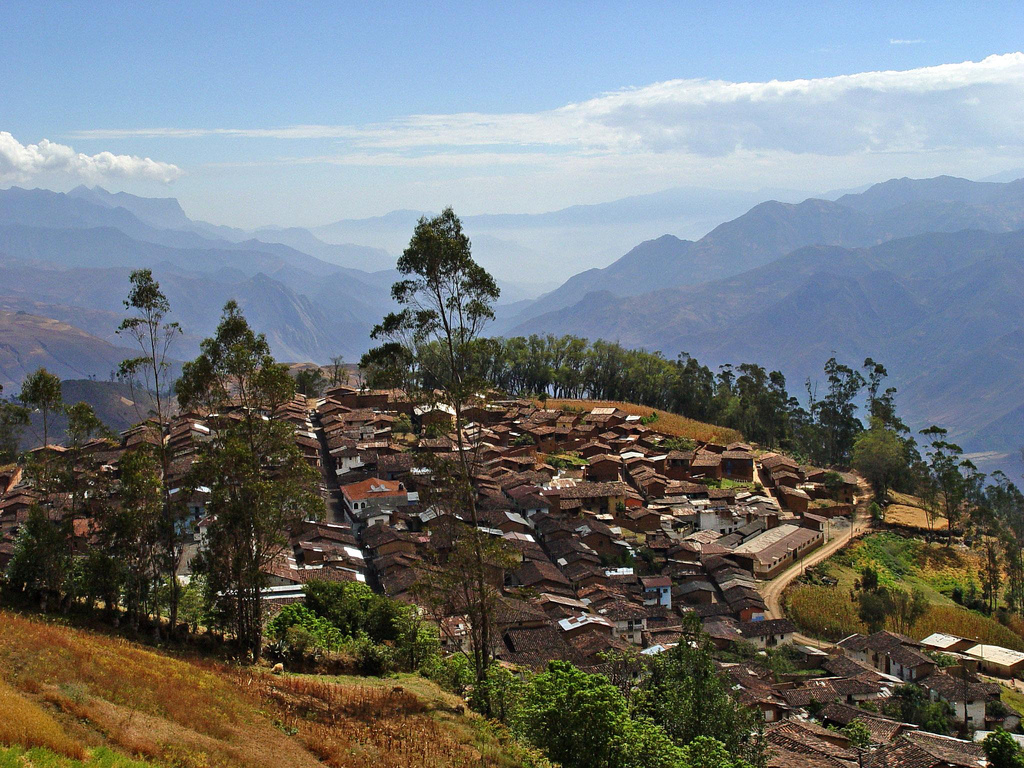
- Usquil
- Interactive map of Usquil
- Country: Peru
- Region: La Libertad
- Province: Otuzco
- Capital: Usquil

Government
  - Mayor: Heli Adan Verde Rodriguez

Area
  - Total: 445.82 km^{2} (172.13 sq mi)
- Elevation: 3,018 m (9,902 ft)

Population (2005 census)
  - Total: 26,053
  - Density: 58.438/km^{2} (151.35/sq mi)
- Time zone: UTC-5 (PET)
- UBIGEO: 130614

Usquil District is one of ten districts of the province Otuzco in Peru.
