= José Quiroga (footballer) =

Argentine footballer

Personal information
- Full name: José Manuel Quiroga
- Date of birth: 18 February 1986 (age 40)
- Place of birth: Resistencia, Chaco, Argentina
- Height: 1.80 m (5 ft 11 in)
- Position: Forward

Senior career*
Years	Team	Apps	(Gls)
2006–2007	Defensores de Belgrano	1	(0)
2008	Sarmiento de Resistencia	–	(–)
2009–2011	Boca Río Gallegos	60	(23)
2011	Gimnasia y Tiro	9	(1)
2012–2013	Deportivo Madryn	39	(13)
2013	Curicó Unido	4	(0)
2014–2015	Sportivo Las Parejas	16	(8)
2015	Gimnasia CdU	18	(2)
2016	Juventud Antoniana	3	(0)
2016	Camioneros Argentinos	13	(2)
2017–2018	Pellegrini Salta	9	(2)
- * Club domestic league appearances and goals

José Manuel Quiroga (born February 18, 1986, in Buenos Aires, Argentina) is an Argentine former footballer who played as a forward.

== Teams ==
- (Argentina) Defensores de Belgrano 2006–2007
- (Argentina) Sarmiento de Resistencia 2008
- (Argentina) Boca Río Gallegos 2009–2011
- (Argentina) Gimnasia y Tiro 2011
- (Argentina) Deportivo Madryn 2012–2013
- (Chile) Curicó Unido 2013
- (Argentina) Sportivo Las Parejas 2014–2015
- (Argentina) Gimnasia y Esgrima de Concepción del Uruguay 2015
- (Argentina) Juventud Antoniana 2016
- (Argentina) Camioneros Argentinos del Norte 2016
- (Argentina) Pellegrini de Salta 2017–2018
