= Rubén Pacheco =

Costa Rican politician and businessman

Rubén Pacheco Lutz is a Costa Rican businessman and former politician. Pacheco was the minister of tourism from 2002–2006. In that position, Pacheco emphasized "the country’s developed assets and stress the jungle less". Since leaving the government, Pacheco founded Enjoy Group Hotels & Resorts. He is the cousin of former president Abel Pacheco.
