= Jesús Alberto López =

Costa Rician footballer

Personal information
- Full name: Jesús Alberto López Ortiz
- Date of birth: 4 June 1994
- Place of birth: Costa Rica
- Date of death: 29 July 2023 (aged 29)
- Place of death: Río Cañas, Guanacaste, Costa Rica
- Position: Midfielder

Senior career*
Years	Team	Apps	(Gls)
–2023	Deportivo Cañas		
- * Club domestic league appearances and goals as of 19 February 2024

Jesús Alberto López Ortiz (4 June 1994 – 29 July 2023), was a Costa Rican professional footballer who played as a midfielder.

== Career ==
Played as a central midfielder, "Chucho" López as he was known, was considered the main player of his club, Deportivo Cañas, and one of the great revelations of Costa Rican football.

== Death ==
On 29 July 2023, López decided to dive in the Cañas River in Guanacaste, to cool off from the heat. The footballer was devoured and his body torn apart by an American crocodile, after which his remains were taken to the horrified audience. The crocodile was later shot dead by local authorities, and his team's coach, Luis Carlos Montes, expressed regret over what happened. Jesús López's cousin also died after being eaten by a crocodile in the same river, 15 years earlier. Deportivo Cañas fans paid tribute to the athlete in the match following the incident.

== See also ==
- List of association football players who died during their careers
- Man-eater
