= Antonio Molina =

Antonio Molina may refer to:

- Antonio Molina (singer) (1928–1992), Spanish flamenco singer and actor
- Antonio Molina (cyclist) (born 1991), Spanish cyclist
- José Antonio Molina Rosito (born 1926), known as Antonio Molina, Honduran botanist and professor
- Antonio Molina (composer) (1894–1980), Filipino composer, conductor and music administrator
- Antonio Vilaplana Molina (1926–2010), Roman Catholic bishop
- Antonio Muñoz Molina (born 1956), Spanish writer
- Antonio de Molina, Spanish Carthusian ascetical writer
- Antonio E. Molina (died 1899), interim mayor of Ponce, Puerto Rico, 1854
