= Luis José de Orbegoso =

President of Peru variously in the 1830s

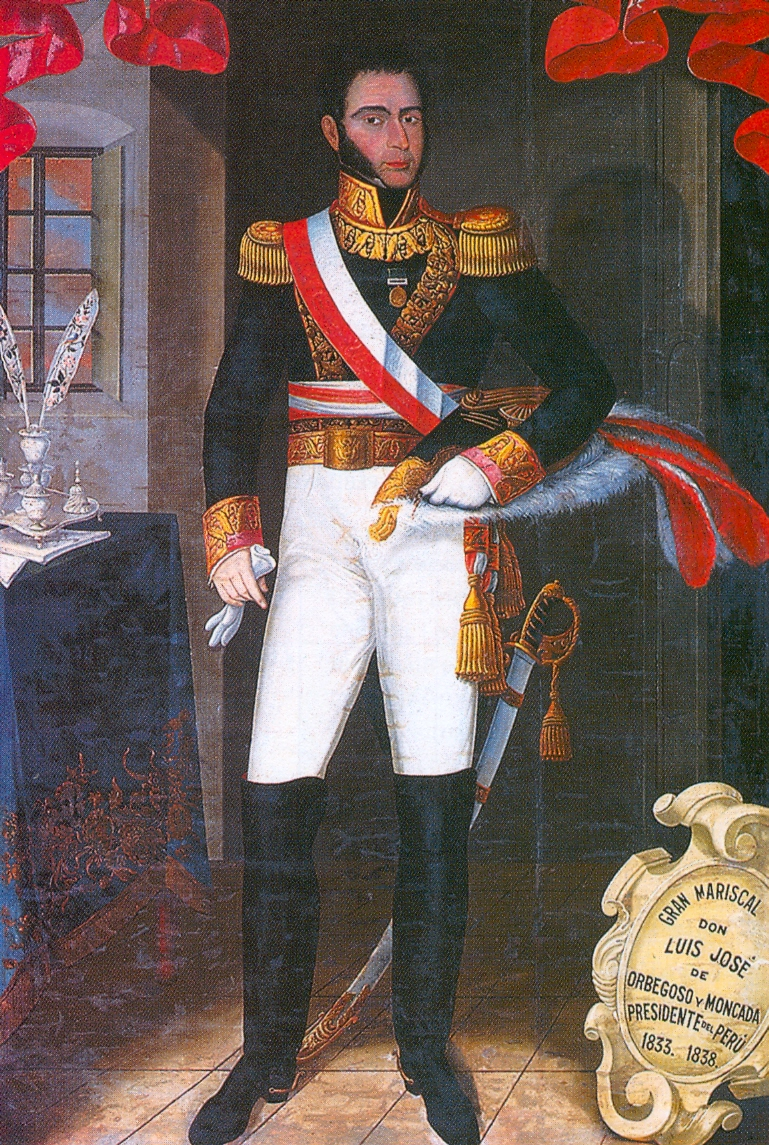
- Portrait by José Gil de Castro

5th President of Peru
- In office December 21, 1833 – February 23, 1835
- Preceded by: Agustín Gamarra
- Succeeded by: Felipe Santiago Salaverry

1st President of North Peru
- In office 21 August 1837 – 30 July 1838
- Preceded by: (Republic created)
- Succeeded by: José de la Riva Agüero

1st President of North Peru
- In office 30 July 1838 – 21 August 1838
- Preceded by: (Republic created)
- Succeeded by: Agustín Gamarra (as President of Peru)

Personal details
- Born: August 25, 1795 Chuquizongo, Huamachuco
- Died: February 5, 1847 (aged 51) Trujillo, Peru
- Profession: Soldier

Luis José de Orbegoso y Moncada-Galindo, de Burutarán y Morales (August 25, 1795 – February 5, 1847), was an aristocratic Peruvian soldier and politician, who served as the 5th President of Peru as well as the first President of North Peru. He supported liberalism. This was a time of profound social instability and continuing civil war which led his government to coexist with that of Pedro Pablo Bermúdez, and later with Felipe Santiago Salaverry.

== Biography ==
Orbegoso was born in Chuquizongo, Huamachuco, on August 25, 1795, into prominent families of Trujillo, North Peru. He was the son of Justo de Orbegoso y Burutarán and Francisca Moncada-Galindo y Morales, 4th Countess of Olmos. His father was an oidor of the Real Audiencia of Quito and later a Mayor of Trujillo. His mother was a member of an ancient family which obtained the title of Count of Olmos in 1690 and were important landowners in Trujillo. Orbegoso was the heir of his mother although he never succeeded her in the title of Count of Olmos among other reasons because Peru was already an independent country at the time of her death.

After receiving his early education privately at the family estate in Chuquizongo, Orbegoso studied Latin at the Seminary of San Carlos and San Marcelo, in Trujillo, and logic, philosophy and mathematics at the Real Convictorio de San Carlos, where he obtained a bachelor's degree in 1812. Although initially he pursued an ecclesiastical career, he dedicated himself to the administration of the family estate after his father died in 1814.

In 1815, Orbegoso initiated his military career as cadet of the Regiment of Cavalry Militia of Trujillo. In this regiment, he successively was ensign of the carabineer's company in 1815, lieutenant of the 7th Company in 1817, aide-de-camp in 1819 and captain in 1820.

In 1816, he married his cousin Josefa Martínez de Pinillos Cacho, a niece of the 1st Count of Premio Real. The couple had fourteen children.

He participated with José de San Martín in the war for independence and in the war against Gran Colombia during the government of José de La Mar. After the collapse of Agustín Gamarra's first government, Orbegoso was elected president in 1833, winning over Pedro Pablo Bermúdez, whom Gamarra had preferred as his successor. Bermúdez subsequently launched an unsuccessful military revolt against Orbegoso.

During his government, he suffered the enmity of Gamarra, who while in exile had supported Bermúdez in his eventual presidency. Orbegoso had also to deal with the young Felipe Santiago Salaverry, who overthrew him a 1835 military coup. Orbegoso, however, did not lose the support of southern Peru and, with the support of then President of Bolivia, Andrés de Santa Cruz, he regained his leadership throughout the country and executed Salaverry. In retribution to the support he received from Santa Cruz, he acceded to form the new Peru-Bolivian Confederacy. Santa Cruz assumed the "Supreme Protectorship" of the confederation and Orbegoso maintained only the presidency of the Republic of North Peru.

After being defeated by Gamarra's efforts to regain power with the support of Chile, Orbegoso had to abandon the country, returning later and staying away from an active political life. He died in Trujillo in 1847. His descendants rehabilitated the title of Count of Olmos.

== Gallery ==
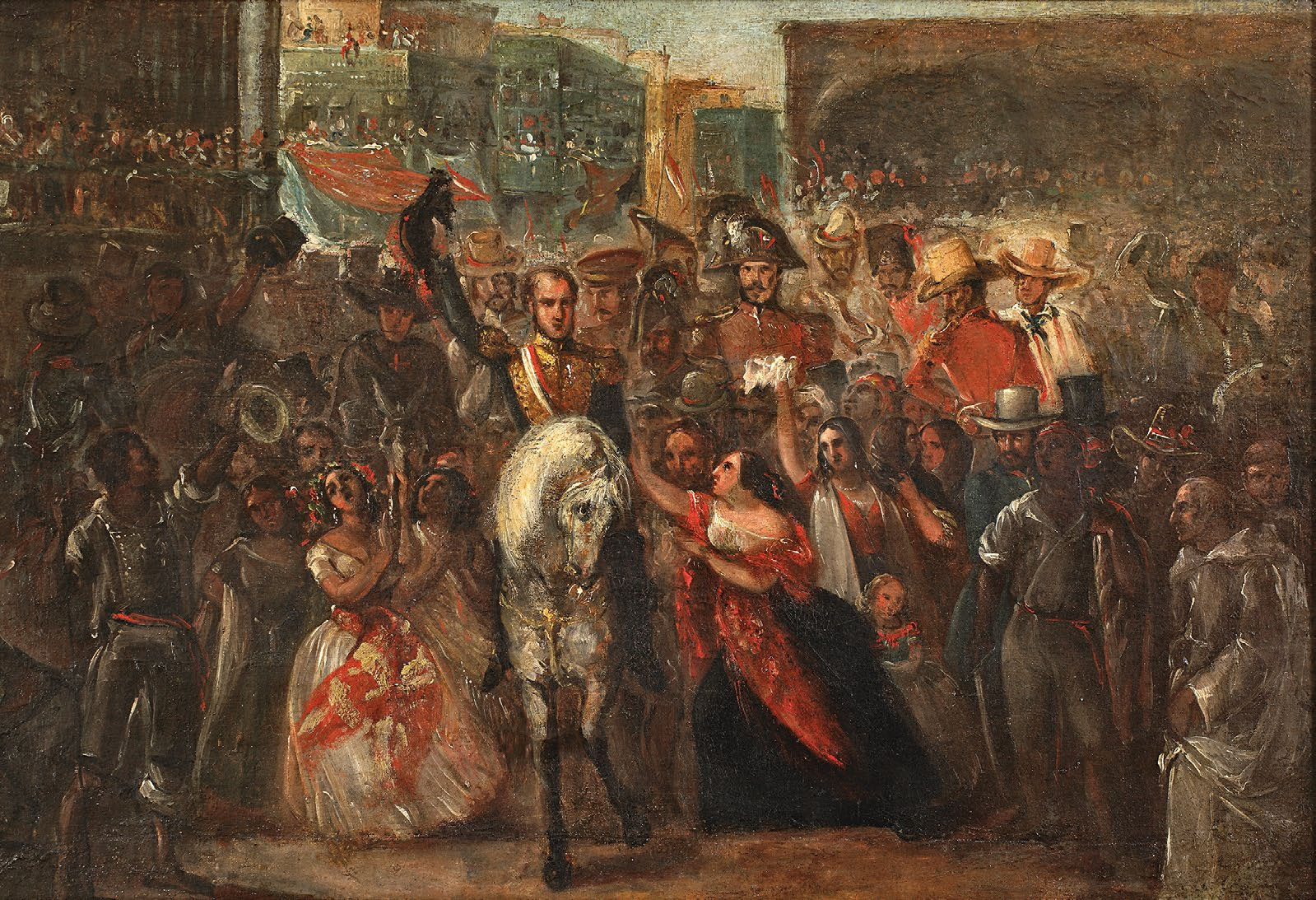
1842 painting by Ignacio Merino, depicting Orbegoso's 1834 entry into Lima during the Peruvian Civil War

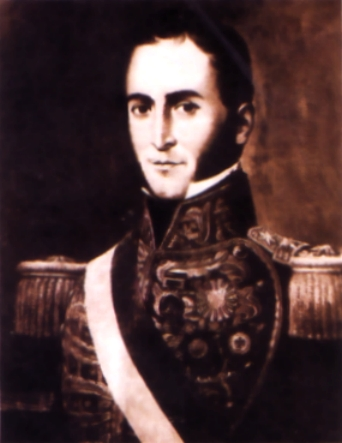
19th-century depiction of Orbegoso

Political offices
Preceded by Francisco Xavier de Luna Pizarro	President of Peru; 1833	Succeeded by Pedro Pablo Bermúdez
Preceded by Pedro Pablo Bermúdez	President of Peru; 1834–1835	Succeeded by Felipe Santiago Salaverry
Preceded by (Republic created)	President of North Peru; 1837–1838	Succeeded by José de la Riva Agüero
Preceded by (Republic created)	President of North Peru; 1837–1838	Succeeded by Agustín Gamarra
