= Pedro Pablo Bermúdez =

Peruvian politician

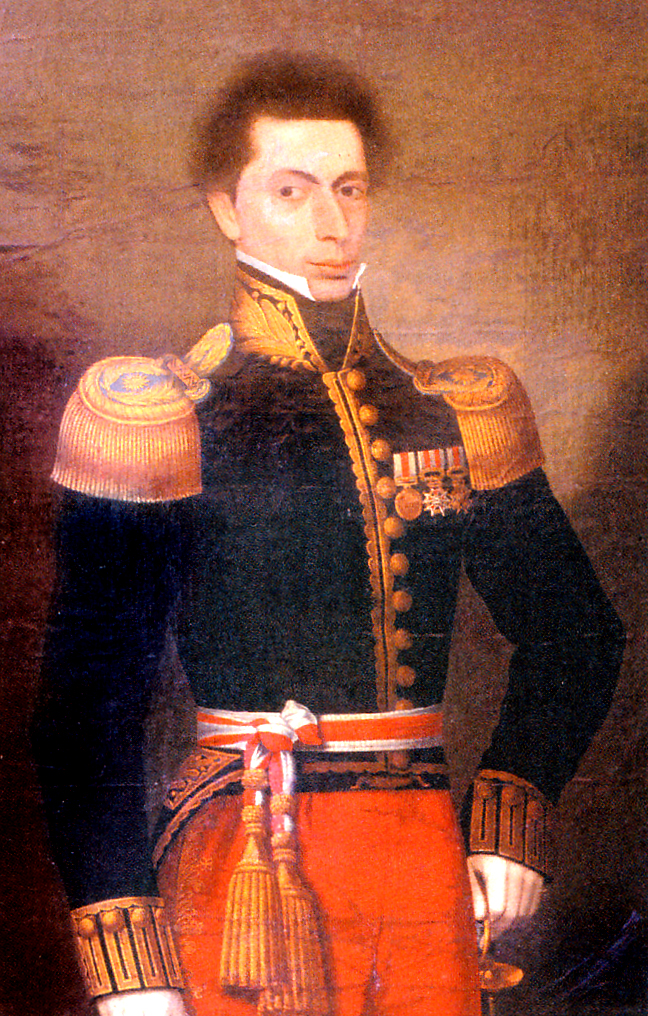
Pedro Pablo Bermúdez

Pedro Pablo Bermúdez Ascarza (27 June 1793 – 30 March 1852) was a Peruvian politician and a member of the Peruvian military. He briefly served as the Provisional Supreme Ruler of Peru between 4 January and 24 April 1834, having previously served as Minister of War from 1832 to 1833.

His government was paralleled to that of Luis José de Orbegoso y Moncada, which was chosen as the President of the Republic. They confronted each other for control of the nation and he was defeated. He counted on the support of the marshal, Agustín Gamarra. He was exiled to Costa Rica on two occasions where he married a Costa Rican lady named Rosalía Escalante Nava, belonging to a very influential family in that country.

Political offices
Preceded by Luis José de Orbegoso y Moncada (parallel government)	Provisional Supreme Ruler; 1834	Succeeded by Luis José de Orbegoso y Moncada (parallel government)
