= Alejandro Deustua =

Peruvian educator and politician

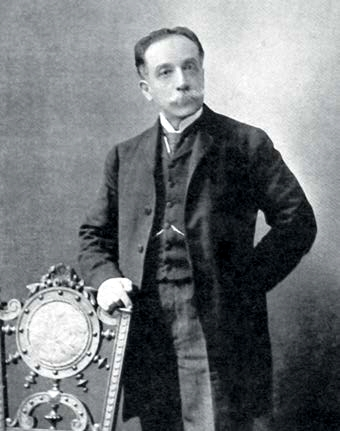

Prime Minister of Peru
- In office 9 August 1902 – 4 November 1902
- President: Eduardo López de Romaña
- Preceded by: Cesáreo Chacaltana Reyes
- Succeeded by: Eugenio Larrabure y Unanue

Personal details
- Born: March 22, 1849 Huancayo, Peru
- Died: August 6, 1945 (aged 96) Lima, Peru
- Education: Universidad de San Marcos
- Occupation: Prime minister, statesman, philosopher, educator

Alejandro Octavio Deustua Escarza (22 March 1849 – 6 August 1945) was a Peruvian philosopher, educator and statesman. He was the Prime Minister of Peru from 9 August 1902 until 4 November 1902.

== Biography ==
Deustua was born in Huancayo, Peru. His parents were Remigio Deustua and Toribia Escarza. Deustua studied in Guadalupe National School and graduated from Universidad de San Marcos in Lima, Peru. He died on 6 August 1945 at the age of 96 in Lima, Peru.

== Peruvian ministry in 1902 ==
- Prime Minister and Minister for Home Affairs: Señor Alejandro Deustua
- Minister of War and Marine: Colonel Diez Canseco
- Minister of Justice: Dr. Jose Arias
- Minister of Finance: Señor Jose Reinoso
- Minister of Public Works: Señor Teodoro Elmor

== Works ==
- Copias de historia del arte. -- [Lima : s.n., 1900]
- Apuntes sobre enseñanza secundaria. -- Lima : Impr. Americana, 1908
- La Cultura superior en Italia. -- Lima : Librería francesa científica, 1912
- A propósito de un cuestionario sobre la reforma de la ley de instrucción. -- [Lima] : Impr. M. A. Dávila, 1914
- La reforma de la segunda enseñanza. -- Lima : Impr. del "Centro Editorial", 1916
- Las ideas de orden y de libertad en la historia del pensamiento humano. -- Lima : Casa Ed. E.R. Villarán, 1919
- Apuntes para el curso de estética. -- Lima : Emp. Tip. Unión, [1920?]
- Estética general. -- Lima : Imp. Eduardo Rávago, [1923]
- Lo bello en la naturaleza. -- Lima : Impr. A.J. Rivas Berrio, 1929
- La cultura superior en Suiza. -- Lima : Impr. A.J. Rivas Berrio, 1929
- Estética aplicada. Lo bello en la naturaleza (apuntes) . -- Lima : Impr. A.J. Rivas Berrio, 1929
- Informe presentado al Supremo gobierno del Perú. -- Lima : Impr. A.J. Berrio, 1929–1930
- Ante el conflicto nacional. -- [Callao] : Emp. Edit. de El Callao, [1931?]
- Estética aplicada. -- Lima : Compañía de Impresiones y publicidad, 1932
- Lo bello en el arte. -- Lima : Compañía de Impresiones y Publicidad, 1932
- Estética aplicada : lo bello en el arte: escultura, pintura, música, apuntes y extractos. -- Lima : Impr. Americana, [1935?]
- Cultura política. -- Lima : Emp. Ed. El Callao, [1936?]
- La cultura nacional. -- Lima : [Empresa Ed. de El Callao], 1937
- Los sistemas de moral. -- [Callao] : Ed. El Callao, 1938–1940
- La estética de José Vasconcelos. -- Lima : Tall. Gráf. de P. Barrantes C., 1939
- Ensayos escogidos de filosofía y educación nacional. -- [Lima : Cía. de Impresiones y Publicidad, 1967] (obra postuma).
- El problema nacional de la educación. -- [Lima : Emp. Editora de El Callao, 1970?] (obra póstuma).
