= Belisario Sosa =

Peruvian politician (1846–1933)

Belisario Sosa ( Lima, 1846- Lima, February 13, 1933 ) was a Peruvian medical doctor and politician. He served as Second Vice President of the Republic in the first government of Augusto Leguía (1908–1912). He served as Minister of Development and Public Works in the second government of José Pardo (1915–1917).

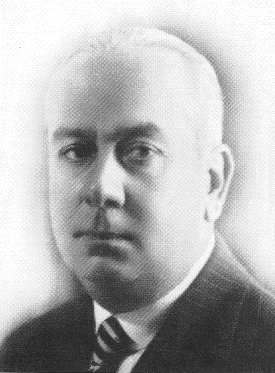
Belisario Sosa

== Biography ==
He studied at Seminario de Santo Toribio and at Convictorio de San Carlos. Then he entered the Faculty of Medicine of the University of San Marcos, from where he graduated as a bachelor in 1868, a graduate in 1869 and a doctor of medicine in 1872. After completing studies, he dedicated himself to teaching in different universities.

When the War of the Pacific broke out, he joined in the health service of the Army. He was admitted in the Army with the rank of lieutenant. Together with Juan Cancio Cancino, he played a role in the construction of the "Hospital de la Cruz Blanca", which was founded by the assistance of influential women in the Lima elite, including Jesús Yturbide de Piérola (wife of dictator Nicolás de Piérola).For this initiative, he received a special medal.

After the war, he was appointed chief surgeon of the army in 1885. In 1889, he became professor of Military Hygiene at the Military Academy. He contributed to the foundation of the department of Medicine, and he was elected deputy dean (1899) and dean (1903) in the department. He was appointed director of the women's clinic at the Hospital de Santa Ana (1903). He attended the Latin American Medical Congress summit in Buenos Aires (1904). Back in Peru, he formed and headed the commission in charge of studying the problem of tuberculosis in the country, which was able to launch a successful campaign against the disease.

Simultaneously, he was active in politics. He was a member of the Constitutional Party. He was elected senator from Amazonas (1894) and Tacna (1906). He was also a delegate from the court of justice in the National Electoral Board (1905–1911). The electoral board was dissolved by President Augusto B. Leguía to hinder the competitiveness of the opposition.

He was elected Second vice president of the Republic in 1908–1912, while Eugenio Larrabure y Unanue was elected as the First vice president, in the first government of Leguía.

He was president of the Public Charitable Society from 1913 to 1914.

During José Pardo's second government, he was appointed Minister of Development, a position he held from August 23, 1915, to July 27, 1917.

== Bibliography ==
- Basadre Grohmann, Jorge: Historia de la República del Perú (1822 - 1933), Volume 12. Edited by the Empresa Editora El Comercio S. A. Lima, 2005. ISBN 9972-205-74-6 (V.12)
- Tauro del Pino, Alberto: Enciclopedia Ilustrada del Perú. Third Edition. Volume 15, SAL/SZY. Lima, PEISA, 2001. ISBN 9972401499
