= José Gálvez Barrenechea =

Peruvian writer, professor and politician

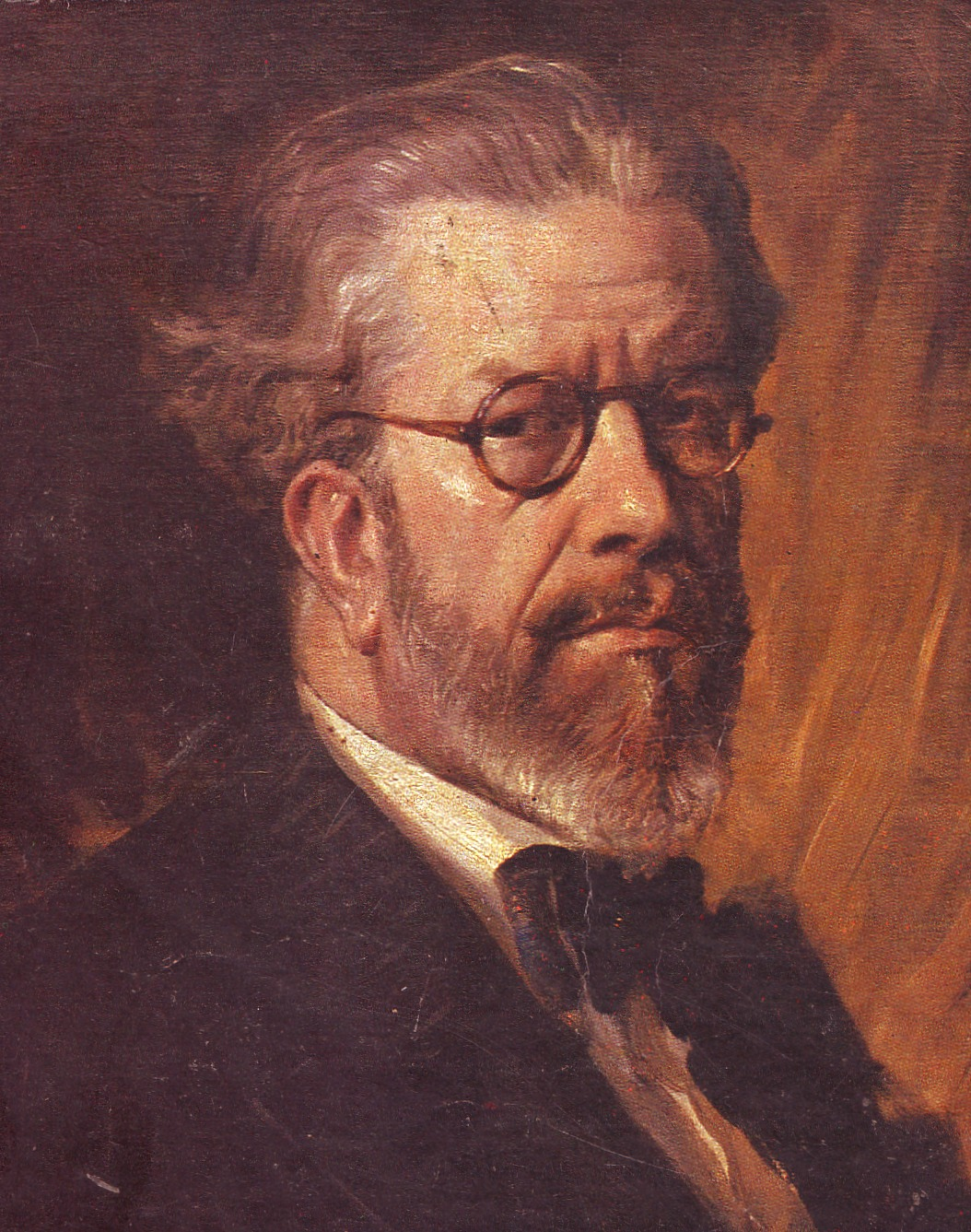

President of the Senate
- In office 28 July 1956 – 8 February 1957
- Preceded by: Héctor Boza
- Succeeded by: Raúl Porras Barrenechea
- In office 28 July 1945 – 29 October 1948
- Preceded by: Ernesto Diez-Canseco Masías
- Succeeded by: Congress dissolved by coup d'état

Member of the Senate
- In office 28 July 1956 – 8 February 1957
- Constituency: Lima
- In office 28 July 1945 – 29 October 1948
- Constituency: Lima

First Vice President of Peru
- In office 28 July 1945 – 29 October 1948
- President: José Luis Bustamante y Rivero
- Preceded by: Rafael Larco Herrera
- Succeeded by: Vacant by coup d'état (Héctor Boza elected in 1950)

Minister of Foreign Relations
- In office 25 July 1931 – 8 December 1931
- President: David Samanez Ocampo
- Preceded by: Rafael Larco Herrera
- Succeeded by: Luis Miró Quesada

Minister of Justice, Worship and Instruction
- In office 11 March 1931 – 25 July 1931
- President: David Samanez Ocampo
- Preceded by: Elías Lozada Benavente
- Succeeded by: Guillermo Garrido Lecca

Personal details
- Born: 7 August 1885 Tarma, Peru
- Died: 8 February 1957 (aged 71) Lima, Peru
- Education: National University of San Marcos (BA, PhD)
- Occupation: Poet, writer, journalist, politician

José Gálvez Barrenechea (7 August 1885 – 8 February 1957) was a Peruvian poet, writer, journalist, university professor, and politician. He was Minister of Justice, Worship and Instruction (1931); Minister of Foreign Relations (1931); First Vice President of the Republic (1945–1948); President of the Senate (1956–1957), and also Grand Master of the Masonic Grand Lodge of Peru (1955–1956), among other academic and political positions, which he carried out with notable success.

As a writer, he achieved reputation for his entertaining and informed chronicles on landscapes and customs of the Peruvian capital, which earned him the name of "Chronicler of Lima"; and for his elegant, refined and harmonious poetry, circumscribed in modernism, which resulted in his being proclaimed as the "Poet of Youth" in 1908. For his literary work, he earned many awards.

== Early life ==
Barrenechea was born in Tarma, a mountain city in central Peru. He was the son of the engineer Justiniano A. Gálvez Moreno and Amalia Barrenechea y Gutiérrez de la Fuente. On the paternal side, he was the grandson of José Gálvez Egúsquiza, who was a hero of the battle of 2 May 1866, and nephew of José Gálvez Moreno, a hero of the Pacific War of 1879–1883. On the maternal side, he was the grandson of the jurist and diplomat José Antonio Barrenechea y Morales and great-grandson of Marshal Antonio Gutiérrez de la Fuente, who was supreme head of the Republic in 1829.

After his father died in 1894, his family moved to Lima. He completed his elementary studies from La Inmaculada and high school studies at the College of Our Lady of Guadalupe.

In the 5th year of the latter in 1901, he served as editor of La voz guadalupana along with other distinguished associates, such as Constantino Carvallo, Baltasar Caravedo, Hermilio Valdizán and Pedro Yrigoyen Diez Canseco.

== Education ==
After completing his studies of high school in 1901, he entered the National University of San Marcos. There he became friends with José de la Riva Agüero y Osma, Víctor Andrés Belaúnde, Ventura García Calderón, and many others. With these persons, he joined the so-called Generation of 900, or "Arielista". Simultaneously, he worked in the Lima Public Charity Society, and later as a journalist in Illustracion Peruana, Varidades, La Cronica and El Comercio.

== Career ==
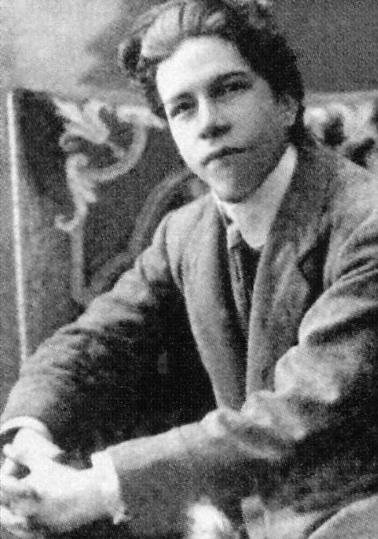
José Galvez

In 1910, he chaired the Peruvian delegation that attended the Second Congress of American Students in Buenos Aires. In 1911, he won an international competition to select the lyrics for the "Hymn to American Students", Chilean composer Enrique Soro wrote the music for the song (1912).

In 1913, he married Amparo Ayarza Noriega, with whom he had three children. One of them died at a premature age.

He graduated with a Bachelor degree in Arts in Literature and Jurisprudence, a Doctor of Philosophy and Literature in 1915 (His thesis was on the "Possibility of a genuine national literature", which in opinion of critics, was a kind of reply to the book "Character of the Literature of Independent Peru", written by Riva Agüero), and a doctor in Law, in 1922.

In 1915 he began teaching at the university in San Marcos, retaining different posts, such as the professor of Spanish Literature (1920), American and Peruvian Literature (1922–1924) and Ancient Literature (1925–1932), as well as the dean of the Faculty of Arts (1928–1932). Between 1918 and 1920, he served as the Peruvian consul in Barcelona, Spain, a position he resigned due to strifes with President Augusto Leguía.

An active participant in Peruvian politics, Galvez joined the Democratic Nationalist Party (derived from the former Democratic Party or pierolista), and served as the mayor of Tarma (1921), where he accomplished many feats. He was a prominent cultivator of "La Muliza", organizing a lavish carnival with Oscar and Carlos y Néstor Arrieta y Barinaga, who were brothers. They were landowners and friends of the Gálvezs from a century ago. He was later legal advisor to the delegation sent to the Tacna and Arica plebiscite commission (1926).

After the first presidency of Commander Luis Sánchez Cerro, he was part of the cabinet led by David Samanez Ocampo. Between 11 March and 23 July 1931, he was Minister of Justice and Instruction. On 25 July 1931, he became Minister of Foreign Affairs, and remained in the post till 8 December.

When Commander Luis Sánchez Cerro assumed the presidency of Peru for a second term, Galvez withdrew from politics and returned to journalism. After the assassination of Sánchez Cerro and the rise to power of General Óscar R. Benavides, he became Minister plenipotentiary to Colombia in 1935. Following the annulment of the victory of Luis Antonio Eguiguren in the 1936 elections, he resigned his diplomatic post and returned to Peru, departing again from politics. The University of San Marcos entrusted him with the study of popular literature, where he was preoccupied in the study of marineras, a traditional form of dance in Peru. In 1938 he contributed to the foundation of the National Association of Writers and Artists (ANEA), of which he was the first president.

== Return to politics ==
He returned to politics as one of the promoters of the National Democratic Front, which launched the candidacy of José Luis Bustamante y Rivero with a view to the 1945 general elections, which won the elections. He was elected First Vice President and Senator of the Republic, and became president of the chamber (1945–1948). After the coup d'état of General Manuel A. Odría, he once again retired from politics.

In 1956, during Peru's democratic transition he headed the list to Congress by the Independent Democratic Front in the elections and was elected Senator of the Republic by Lima, winning by a wide margin. For the second time, he assumed the presidency of the Chamber (therefore, of the Congress). he died in Lima on 8 February 1957, at the age of 71 in office. His burial, which was given the honor a president's burial is supposed to receive, attracted massive gatherings.

In addition, he was president of the Club Jose Galvez, a member of the Bar Association of the Geographical Society of the National Club of the Club of the Union, of the Historical Institute of Peru, the Peruvian Academy of Language, the Academy of Arts and Letters of Havana, the Royal Spanish Academy and the Academy of History of Madrid.

Among his literary creations, which included prose and poetry, the most famous are- Nuestra pequeña historia, Estampas limeñas, Jardín cerrado, Oda pindárica a Grau y Canto Jubilar a Lima.

== Bibliography ==
- Samaniego, Antenor: Literatura. Text and anthology. School Manual for the 5th grade of secondary education. Seventh edition. Librería Arica S.A., Lima, 1964.
- Tauro del Pino, Alberto: Enciclopedia Ilustrada del Perú. Third Edition. Volume 7. Lima, PEISA, 2001. ISBN 9972-40-156-1
- Various authors: Grandes Forjadores del Perú. Lima, Lexus Editores, 2000. ISBN 9972-625-50-8
- "Homenaje Póstumo al expresidente del Senado don José Gálvez Barrenechea". Edited by the Senate of the Republic, Industrial Gráfica S.A., Lima, 1967
- "José Gálvez y la Legalidad Republicana" por Carlos Enrique Ferreyros Urmeneta. Editated by the Bar association of Lima, Editorial Nueva Educación, 1973.
