= Ministry of Development (Peru) =

Government ministry of Peru

Ministry of Development and Public Works
- Ministerio de Fomento y Obras Públicas
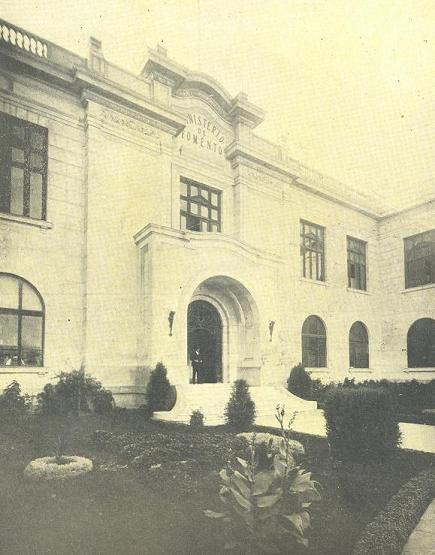
- Former headquarters

Ministry overview
- Formed: January 22, 1896
- Dissolved: 1969
- Superseding agencies: Ministry of Transport and Communications; Ministry of Housing
- Jurisdiction: Government of Peru
- Headquarters: Park of the Exhibition, Lima

The Ministry of Development and Public Works (Spanish: Ministerio de Fomento y Obras Públicas, MFOP) was a government ministry of Peru. Created in 1896, it oversaw the development of public works, infrastructure and charity. Its former headquarters, located at the Park of the Exhibition, now house the Metropolitan Museum of Lima since 2010.

== History ==
The ministry was created on January 22, 1896, under the presidency of Nicolás de Piérola, with Eduardo López de Romaña chosen to serve as its first minister. The ministry initially brought together the following offices:

- Public Works (which had previously belonged to the Ministry of Government and Police).
- Industries (which was previously part of the Ministry of Finance).
- Charity (which came from the Ministry of Justice and Instruction).

By the decree of February 25, 1896, two Directorates were created in the Ministry: Development (in charge of mining, industry, charity and hygiene matters) and Public Works and Irrigation. By law of October 3, 1896, the School of Engineers became dependent on this Ministry (previously dependent on the Ministry of Justice and Instruction).

The Minister's office was in the Government Palace, later being transferred to the premises where the Municipal Palace stands today. In 1910, its permanent transfer to the Palace of the Exhibition was arranged, where he shared the facilities with the Municipal Council of Lima. Over time, this location became insufficient and the ministry was housed in a building located on 28 de Julio Avenue.

The founding of this ministry constituted a milestone in the restructuring of the Peruvian state in the aftermath of the War of the Pacific. From the founding of Peru until then, there had only been five ministries: Government and Police; Foreign Relations; Justice and Instruction; Finance and Commerce; and War and Navy. The creation of a Ministry of Development implied that the State was convinced that it should promote the economic and material development of the country. The new ministry attracted a new bureaucracy, made up of engineers, sociologists, economists, doctors, and geographers. Throughout the 20th century, this ministry was disintegrated into several others.

== List of ministers ==
Image	Minister	Party	Term start	President
	Eduardo López de Romaña		25 January 1896	Nicolás de Piérola
	Manuel J. Cuadros		8 August 1896	Nicolás de Piérola
	Ricardo L. Flores	Liberal	25 November 1897	Nicolás de Piérola
	Francisco Almenara Butler		17 May 1898	Nicolás de Piérola
	Carlos Basadre Forero		8 September 1899	Eduardo López de Romaña
	Enrique Coronel Zegarra		14 December 1899	Eduardo López de Romaña
	José Granda Esquivel		7 August 1900	Eduardo López de Romaña
	Miguel A. Rojas		30 August 1900	Eduardo López de Romaña
—N/a	Agustín Tovar Aguilar		2 October 1900	Eduardo López de Romaña
—N/a	Agustín de la Torre González		19 March 1901	Eduardo López de Romaña
	Eugenio Larrabure y Unanue		11 September 1901	Eduardo López de Romaña
	Teodoro Elmore		9 August 1902	Eduardo López de Romaña
—N/a	David Matto		4 November 1902	Eduardo López de Romaña
	Manuel C. Barrios		8 September 1903	Manuel Candamo
—N/a	José Balta Paz		14 May 1904	Serapio Calderón
—N/a	José Balta Paz		24 September 1904	José Pardo y Barreda
	Pedro Portillo	Military	9 March 1906	José Pardo y Barreda
—N/a	Delfín Vidalón		31 July 1906	José Pardo y Barreda
	Francisco Alayza y Paz Soldán		24 September 1908	Augusto B. Leguía
—N/a	David Matto Usandivaras		8 June 1909	Augusto B. Leguía
—N/a	Julio Ego-Aguirre Dongo		17 December 1909	Augusto B. Leguía
	Agustín de la Torre González		31 August 1911	Augusto B. Leguía
	José Manuel García Córdova	Civil	30 November 1911	Augusto B. Leguía
—N/a	Fermín Málaga		24 September 1912	Guillermo Billinghurst
	Víctor Castro Iglesias		17 June 1913	Guillermo Billinghurst
	Pedro Portillo	Military	4 August 1913	Guillermo Billinghurst
	Francisco Alayza y Paz Soldán		26 September 1913	Guillermo Billinghurst
	Pedro Portillo	Military	31 December 1913	Guillermo Billinghurst
	Benjamín Boza	Democratic	3 February 1914	Óscar R. Benavides (Government Junta)
	Joaquín Capelo		15 May 1914	Óscar R. Benavides (Provisional)
	Francisco Alayza y Paz Soldán		22 August 1914	Óscar R. Benavides (Provisional)
	Belisario Sosa		18 August 1915	José Pardo y Barreda
	Héctor Escardó Salazar		27 July 1917	José Pardo y Barreda
	Clemente J. Revilla		27 April 1918	José Pardo y Barreda
—N/a	Manuel Vinelli		2 September 1918	José Pardo y Barreda
—N/a	Augusto Arrese Vegas		2 March 1919	José Pardo y Barreda
—N/a	Salvador Gutiérrez Pestana		5 July 1919	Augusto B. Leguía (Oncenio)
—N/a	Matías León		August 1919	Augusto B. Leguía (Oncenio)
—N/a	Salvador Olivares		December 1919	Augusto B. Leguía (Oncenio)
—N/a	Julio Ego-Aguirre Dongo		27 April 1920	Augusto B. Leguía (Oncenio)
	Pedro José Rada y Gamio	PDR	8 March 1921	Augusto B. Leguía (Oncenio)
	Lauro Curletti		15 August 1921	Augusto B. Leguía (Oncenio)
	Pío Max Medina		1 March 1923	Augusto B. Leguía (Oncenio)
—N/a	Manuel G. Masías		12 October 1924	Augusto B. Leguía (Oncenio)
	Pedro José Rada y Gamio	PDR	20 July 1925	Augusto B. Leguía (Oncenio)
	Celestino Manchego Muñoz	PDR	September 1926	Augusto B. Leguía (Oncenio)
	Ernesto Sousa Matute		December 1926	Augusto B. Leguía (Oncenio)
	Celestino Manchego Muñoz	PDR	25 November 1927	Augusto B. Leguía (Oncenio)
—N/a	Alfredo Mendiola		12 October 1929	Augusto B. Leguía (Oncenio)
—N/a	Eduardo Castro Ríos	Military	24 August 1930	Manuel María Ponce (Military Junta)
—N/a	Eulogio Castillo	Military	27 August 1930	Luis Sánchez Cerro (Military Junta)
	Manuel E. Rodríguez	Military	24 November 1930	Luis Sánchez Cerro (Military Junta)
—N/a	Ulises Reátegui Morey		11 March 1931	David Samanez Ocampo (National Junta)
	Germán Arenas y Loayza		8 December 1931	Luis Sánchez Cerro
	Elías Lozada Benavente		29 January 1932	Luis Sánchez Cerro
—N/a	Ricardo Caso			Luis Sánchez Cerro
	Manuel E. Rodríguez	Military		Luis Sánchez Cerro
	Manuel E. Rodríguez	Military	30 April 1933	Óscar R. Benavides (Provisional)
—N/a	Pablo Ernesto Sánchez Cerro	UR	3 May 1933	Óscar R. Benavides (Provisional)
—N/a	Carlos Alayza y Roel		29 June 1933	Óscar R. Benavides (Provisional)
	Héctor Boza		26 November 1933	Óscar R. Benavides (Provisional)
	Manuel E. Rodríguez	Military	21 May 1935	Óscar R. Benavides (Provisional)
	Héctor Boza		13 April 1936	Óscar R. Benavides (Provisional)
—N/a	Federico Recavarren		23 October 1936	Óscar R. Benavides (Provisional)
	Héctor Boza		29 October 1937	Óscar R. Benavides (Provisional)
—N/a	Carlos Moreyra y Paz Soldán		8 December 1939	Manuel Prado Ugarteche
	Enrique Góngora Pareja		28 July 1945	José Luis Bustamante y Rivero
—N/a	César Elías Gonzales			José Luis Bustamante y Rivero
—N/a	Alfredo Fort Magot			José Luis Bustamante y Rivero
—N/a	Jorge Sarmiento Calmet			José Luis Bustamante y Rivero
—N/a	Bernardino Vallenas			José Luis Bustamante y Rivero
—N/a	Alfonso Llosa González-Pavón	Military	3 November 1948	Manuel A. Odría (Military Junta)
	José del Carmen Cabrejo Mejía	Military	28 July 1950	Manuel A. Odría
—N/a	Carlos Salazar Southwell		1951	Manuel A. Odría
—N/a	Eduardo Miranda Sousa		4 August 1952	Manuel A. Odría
—N/a	Fernando Noriega Calmet		26 July 1954	Manuel A. Odría
—N/a	Roberto Dianderas	Military	24 December 1955	Manuel A. Odría
—N/a	Carlos Alzamora Elster	MDP	28 July 1956	Manuel Prado Ugarteche
—N/a	Federico Hilbck Seminario		1957	Manuel Prado Ugarteche
	Eduardo Dibós Dammert		1958	Manuel Prado Ugarteche
—N/a	Alfonso Rizo Patrón		1959	Manuel Prado Ugarteche
—N/a	Jorge Grieve Madge		1960	Manuel Prado Ugarteche
—N/a	Máximo Verástegui Izurieta	Military	26 July 1962	Military Government Junta
—N/a	Carlos Pestana Zevallos		28 July 1963	Fernando Belaúnde Terry
—N/a	Carlos Morales Macchiavello		14 September 1964	Fernando Belaúnde Terry
—N/a	Gastón Acurio Velarde		15 September 1965	Fernando Belaúnde Terry
—N/a	Enrique Tola Mendoza		8 September 1967	Fernando Belaúnde Terry
—N/a	Sixto Gutiérrez Chamorro		29 January 1968	Fernando Belaúnde Terry
—N/a	Pablo Carriquiry Maurer		20 March 1968	Fernando Belaúnde Terry
—N/a	Carlos Morales Macchiavello		1 June 1968	Fernando Belaúnde Terry

== See also ==
- Government of Peru

== Bibliography ==
- Basadre, Jorge (2005). Historia de la República del Perú (1822–1933). Vol. 11 (9th ed.). Lima: Empresa Editora El Comercio S. A. ISBN 9972-205-74-6.
