= Elías Lozada Benavente =

Peruvian politician (1896-1987)

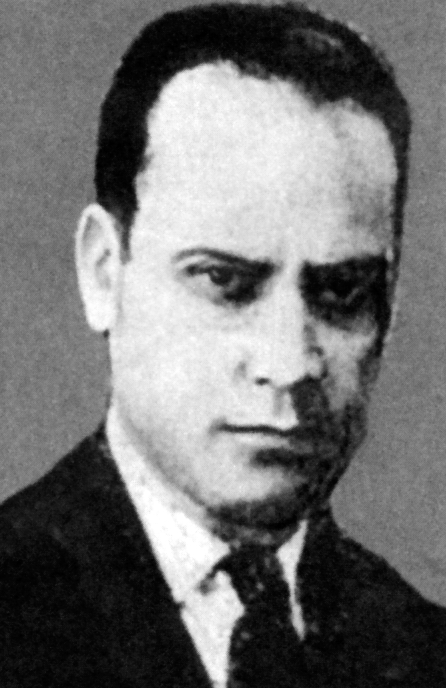

Minister of Development and Public Works of Peru for Arequipa
- In office 29 January 1932 - 19 May 1932
- President: Luis Sánchez Cerro
- Preceded by: Germán Arenas y Loayza
- Succeeded by: Ricardo Caso

Minister of Justice, Religion and Education of Peru
- In office 20 February 1931 - 11 March 1931
- President: Luis Sánchez Cerro (Military Junta)
- Preceded by: José Luis Bustamante y Rivero
- Succeeded by: José Gálvez Barrenechea

Senator of the Republic of Peru for Arequipa
- In office 8 December 1939 – 27 July 1945

Constituent Deputy of the Republic of Peru for Arequipa
- In office 8 December 1931 – 8 December 1936

Personal details
- Born: July 18, 1896 Arequipa, Peru
- Died: August 30, 1987 (aged 91) Lima, Peru
- Party: Social Nationalist Party (Partido Social Nacionalista)
- Parent(s): Hermógenes Lozada and Aurora Benavente
- Education: National University of San Marcos
- Profession: Lawyer, politician

Daniel Elías Lozada Benavente (Arequipa, 18 July 1896-Lima, 30 August 1987) was a Peruvian lawyer, politician, writer, and the founder of the Social Nationalist Party (Spanish: Partido Social Nacionalista). He served as the Minister of Justice (1931), the Constituent Deputy for Arequipa (1931-1936), the Minister of Development and Public Works (1932), and as Senator for Arequipa (1939-1945).

== Life ==
The son of Hermógenes Lozada, from an aristocratic family of Cayma, and Aurora Benavente, he was born in the Arequipa District of Peru. He started his studies in his city of birth and ended them in Lima, where he graduated with a Bachelors and Doctorate in Law at the National University of San Marcos (1920).

== Political career ==
On the first of September 1930, he founded the moderate Social Nationalist Party(Spanish: Partido Social Nacionalista).

He was asked to join the Governing Board headed by Luis M. Sánchez Cerro, as the Minister of Justice and Instruction, a position he held from February to March 1931, when the board was dissolved.

He was elected Deputy of Arequipa in the Constituent Congress (1931-1936). As the leader of a minority party, the Social Nationalist Party, he supported the Congress under the constitutional government of Sánchez Cerro.

In a 1931-1932 Constituent's Congress debate on women's suffrage, Lozada Benavente expressed support for granting women the right to vote, regardless of religion and religiosity. He instead argued that the reasoning should be that women are to be treated as partners, equals in governance.

On January 29, 1932, he became a member of the second ministerial cabinet of the Sánchez Cerro government as the Minister of Development and Public Works. Along with his colleagues Carlos Sayán Álvarez (Minister of Justice and Instruction) and Luis A. Flores (Minister of Government), he was among the youngest ministers within the Peruvian government to that date. He remained in this role until the 19th of May that year.

In 1939 he was elected senator of Arequipa (1939-1945). He presented the bill which established national awards for the promotion of culture (Law 9614). He also authored the original 1920 Code of Minors (Spanish: Código de Menores), the law that governed juvenile criminal law in Peru until its re-writing in 1962, and the 1932 Law 7505, regarding workers rights and protections.

== Interest in the Amazon ==
Lozada Benavente had a personal interest in the cultures and legends of the peoples native to the Amazon. He explored these topics in some of his works, the most well-known being Leyendas amazónicas, where he detailed information he collected both directly from indigenous people and historical record.

== Published Works ==
- Simón Rodríguez, (1919), a historical essay.
- Criminología, (1920).
- Policía judicial científica, (1921).
- Dos dictaduras, (1933).
- Partido Social Nacionalista (1935).
- Vaivenes de la política, (1938), which contains descriptions of Luis Sánchez Cerro.
- Mi homenaje a Arequipa, (1940), a historical essay.
- Leyendas amazónicas, (1942).
- Nuestro Partido, (1944).
- Discursos, (1945).
- Código de menores, (1945).
- Tramontando. Ideario íntimo, (1965).

=== 2018 exhibit ===
In 2018, one of Lozada Benavente's works, Leyendas amazónicas, was featured in a temporary exhibition at the House of Peruvian Literature in Lima, Peru. The exhibition, titled The House Without a Door: Amazonian Literature (1940-1980) (Spanish: La casa sin puerta. Literatura amazónica (1940-1980)), featured works of immense literary value and was open to the public without charge from July to December 2018.
