= Metropolitan Museum of Lima =

Museum in Peru

Coordinates: 12.0636°S 77.0369°W

- Museo Metropolitano de Lima
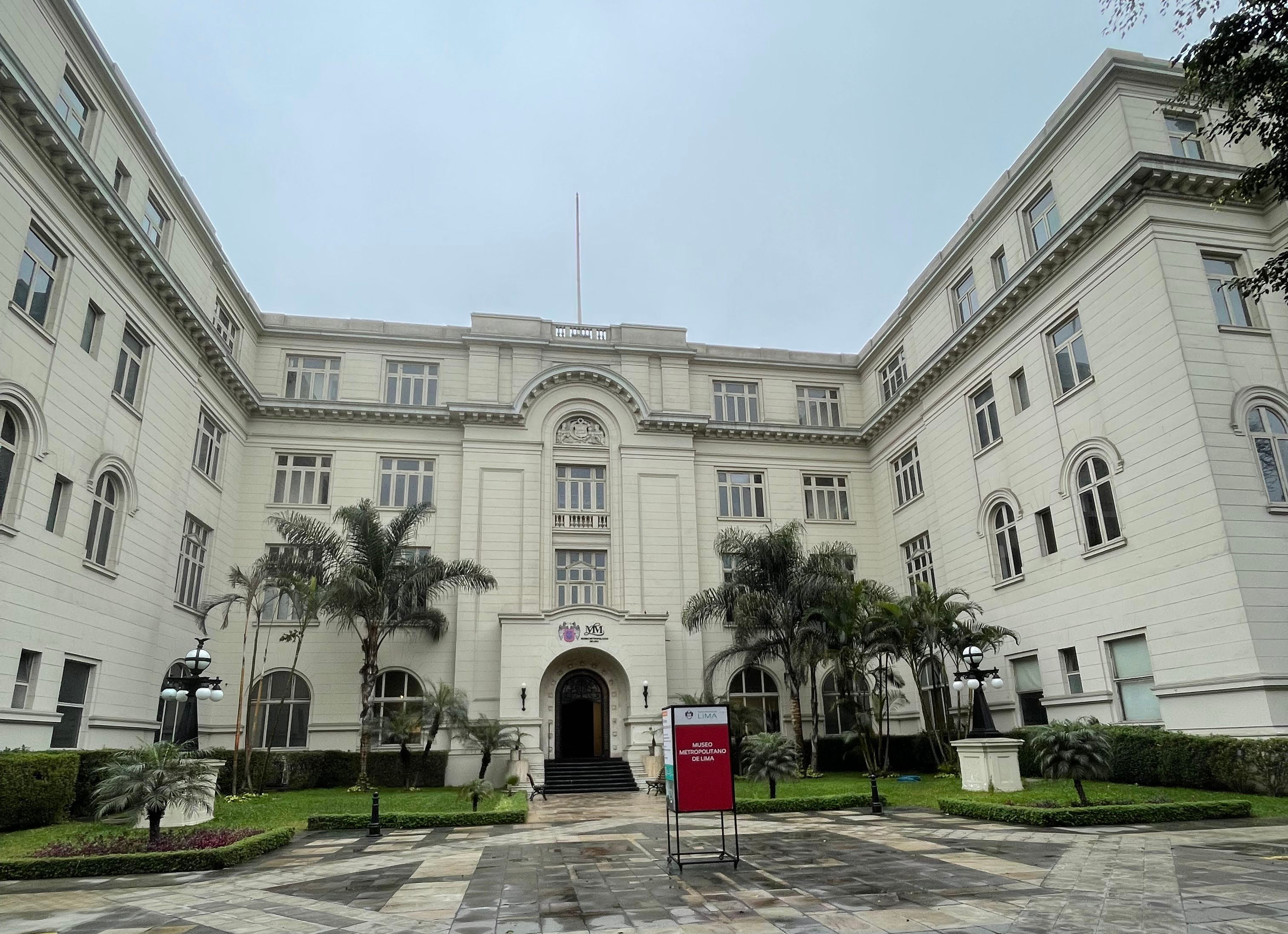
- Established: October 10, 2010
- Location: 28 July & Wilson Ave., Lima
- Architect: Claude Sahut
- Owner: Ministry of Transport and Communications
- Website: Museos de Lima

The Metropolitan Museum of Lima (Spanish: Museo Metropolitano de Lima) is a museum located next to the Park of the Exhibition in Lima, Peru. The neoclassical building that houses the museum was designed by French architect Claude Sahut and built in 1924, formerly housing the country's Ministry of Development and Public Works. It was inaugurated on October 10, 2010.

The museum links the history of the city with the history of Peru using audiovisual resources such as scenery, videos and holograms, which cover the pre-Hispanic, viceregal and republican eras told by the characters who shaped it, such as Viceroy Amat, Rose of Lima, Pancho Fierro, José Olaya, José de San Martín, Simón Bolívar, Ricardo Palma, Abraham Valdelomar, Miguel Grau, among others.

It has 27 projection rooms, whose museographic direction was directed by filmmaker Luis Llosa. It also contains a temporary exhibition hall, the Municipal Library, the Historical Archive and the Taulichusco auditorium.

== Gallery ==
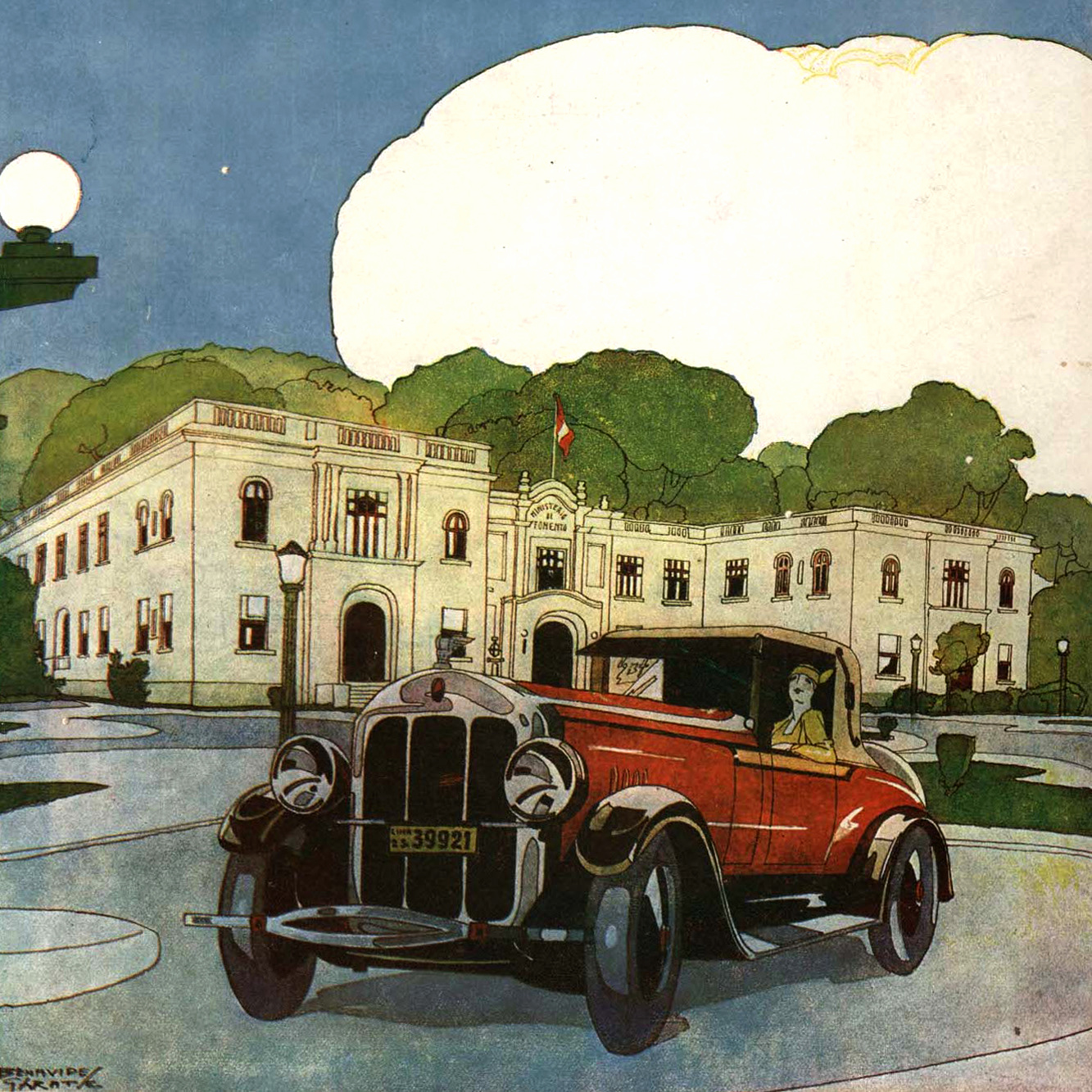
The building in 1928 in Ciudad y Campo y Caminos

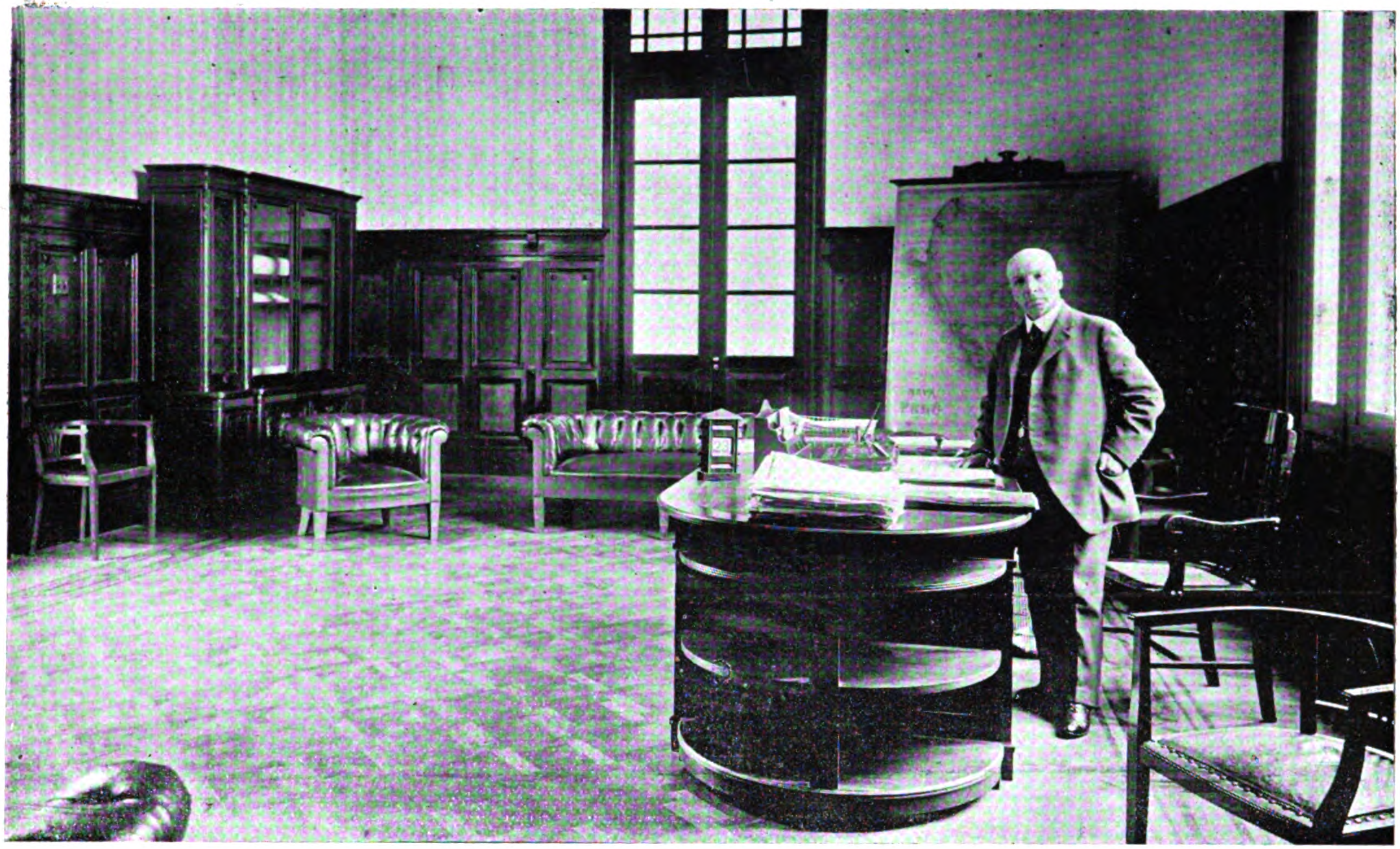
Interior of the building in 1925

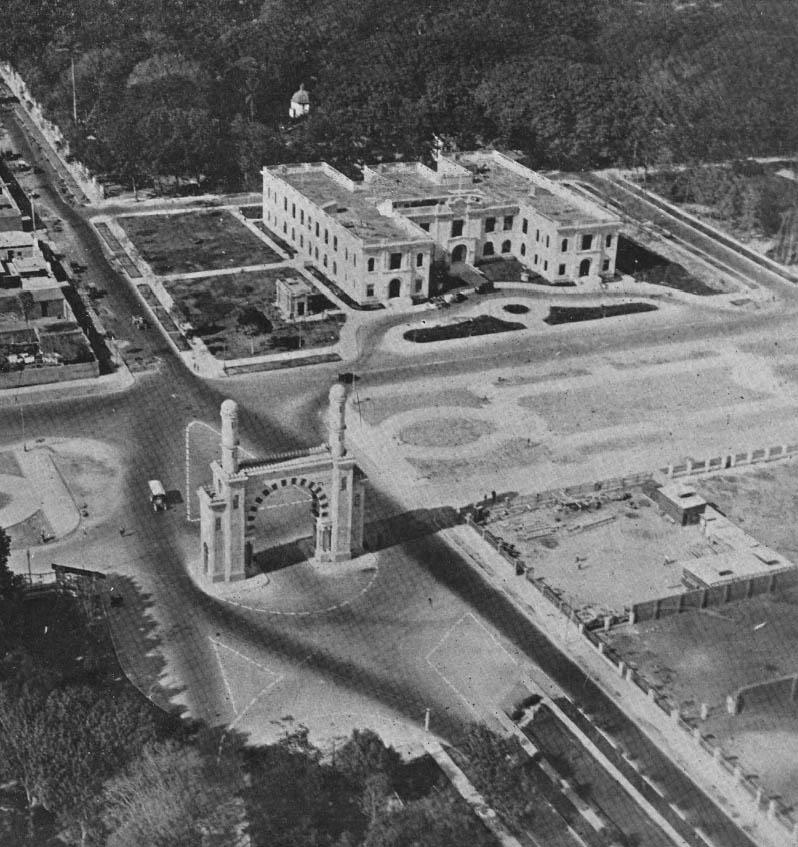
An aerial shot of the building from 1926, also showing features from the larger Parque de la Exposición

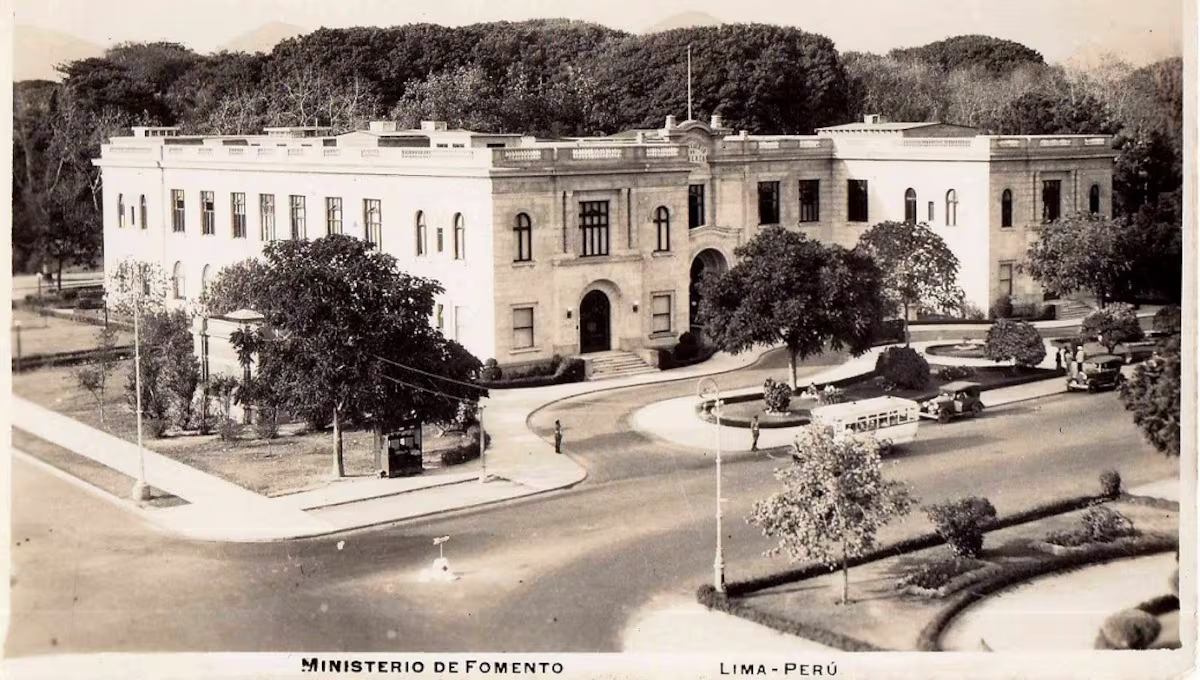
Older photograph from when it housed the Ministry of Development

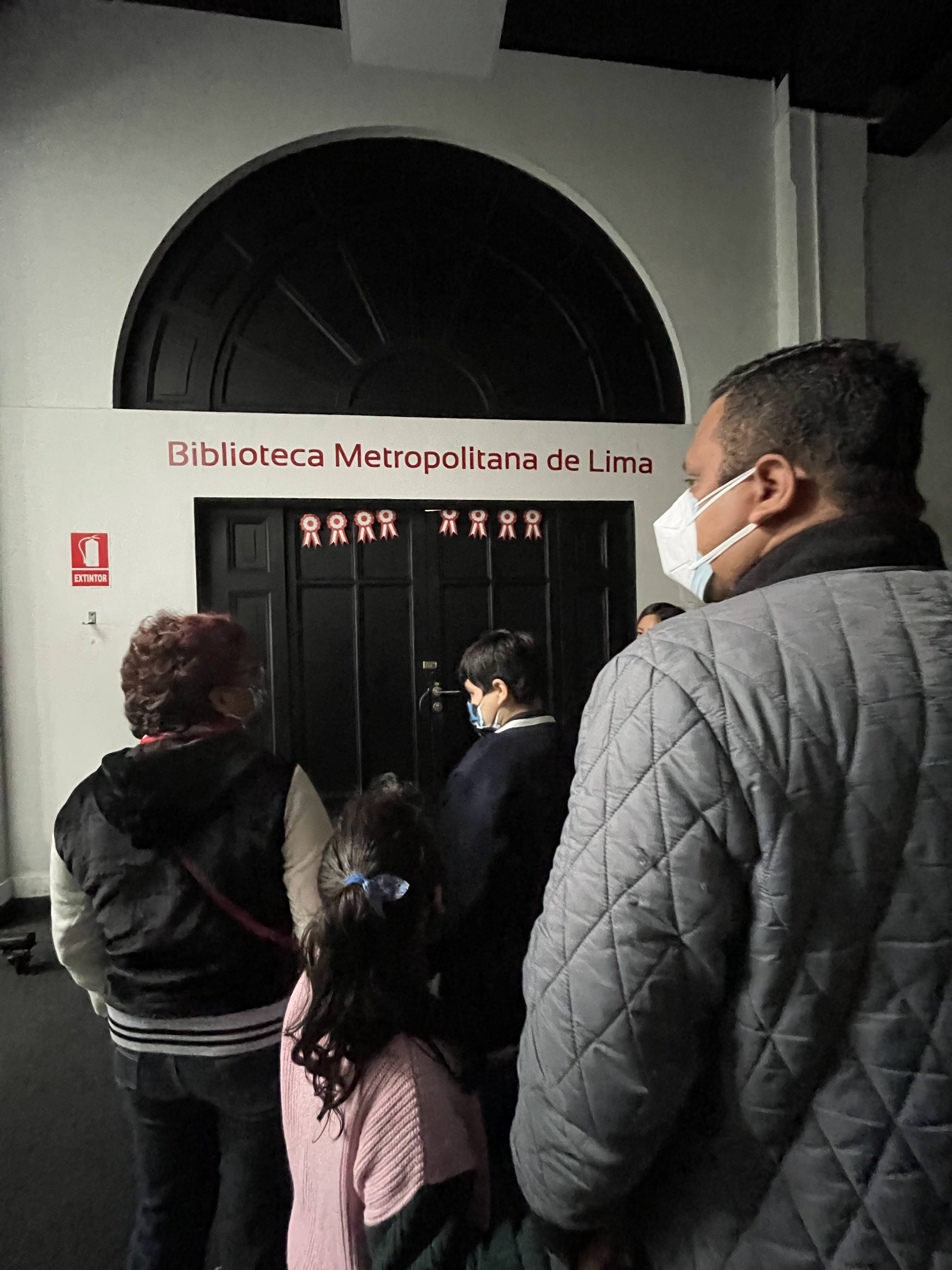
Exterior of the library in 2022

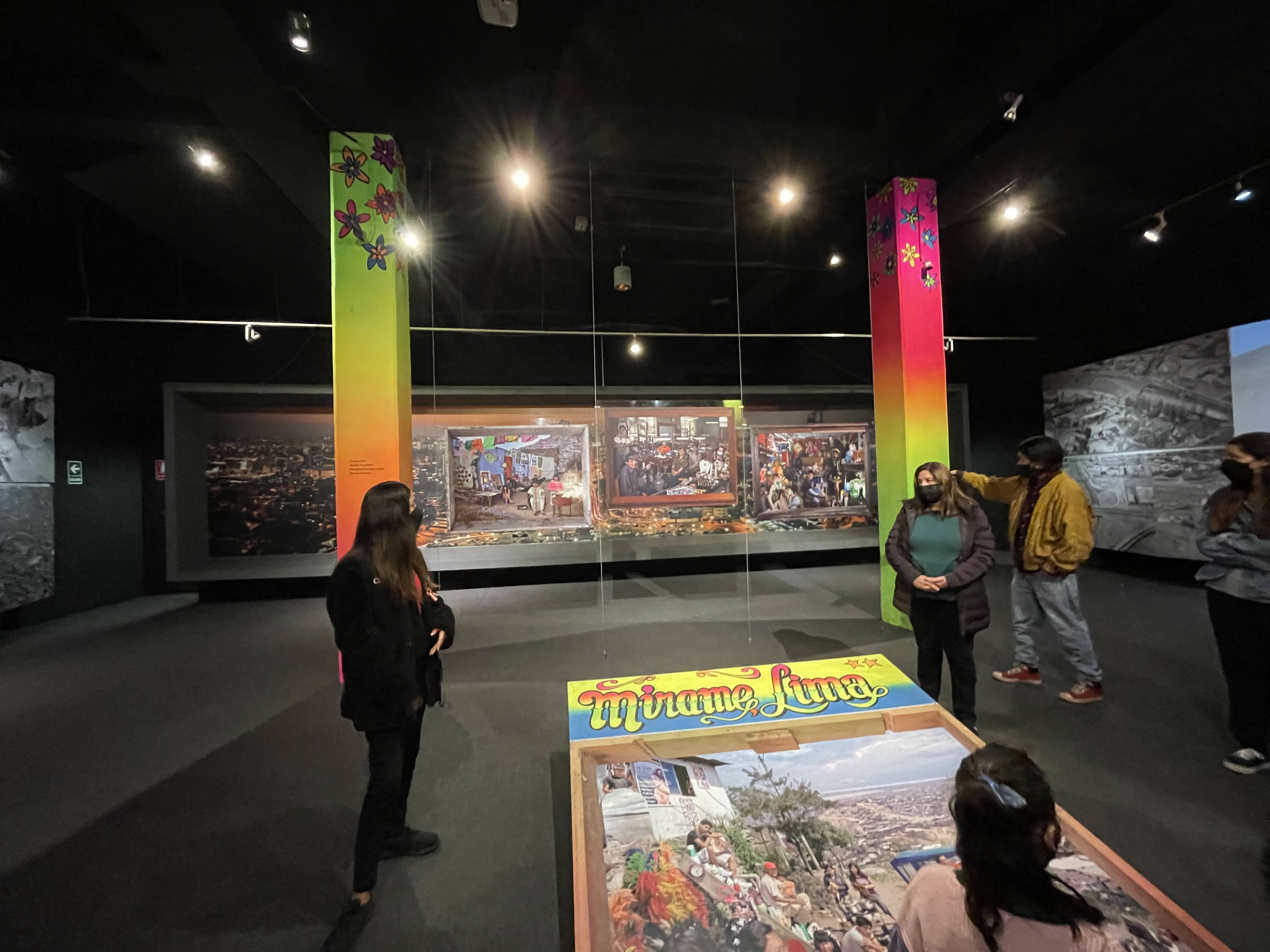
A gallery in the museum in 2022

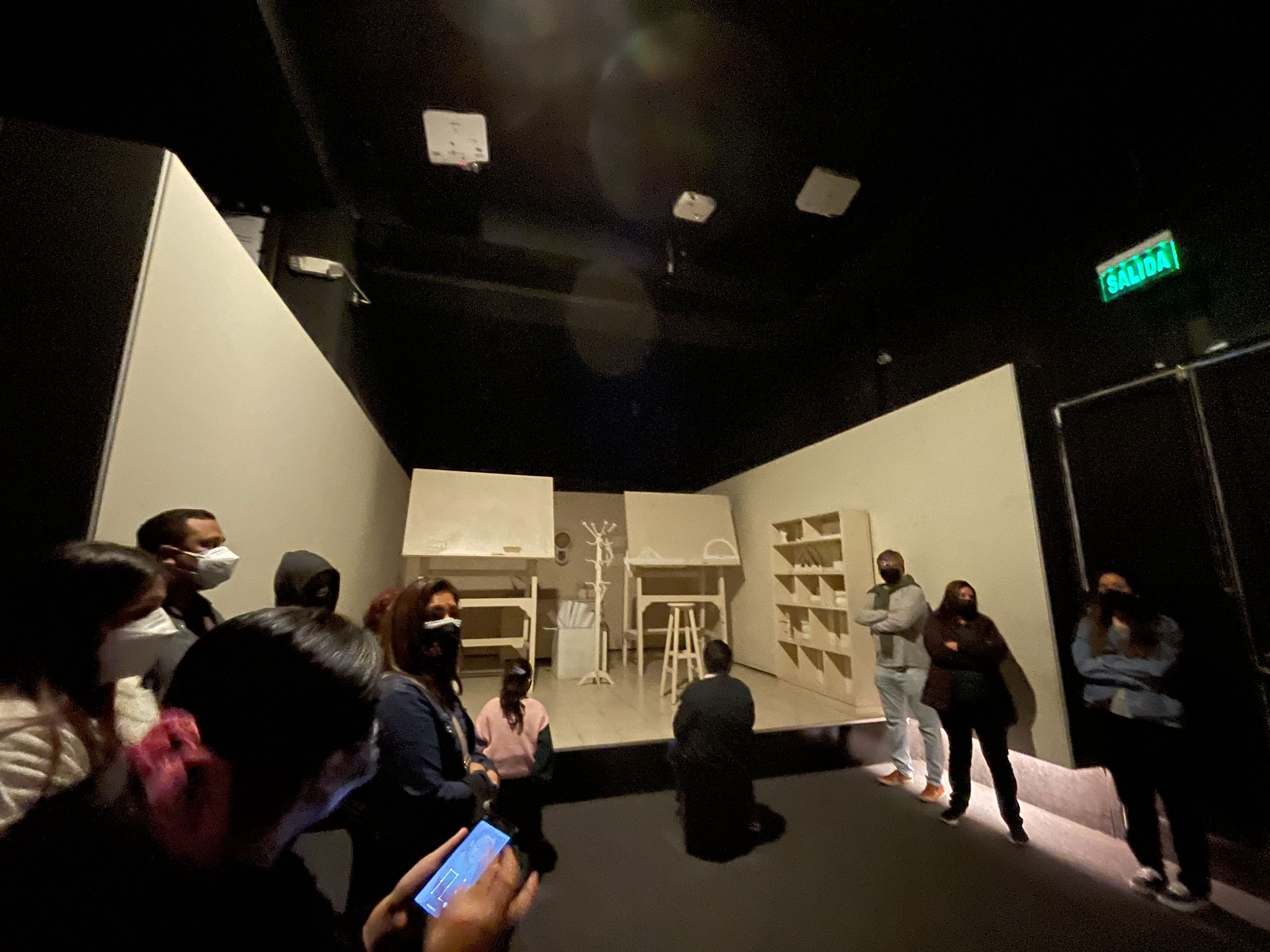
Exhibit in 2022

== See also ==
- List of museums in Lima
