= Nationalist Party (Peru) =

Peruvian political party founded in 1930

Nationalist Party (in Spanish: Partido Social Nacionalista) was a political party in Peru. It was founded in 1930 by Elías Lozada Benavente.
