= Eduardo López de Romaña =

President of Peru from 1899 to 1903

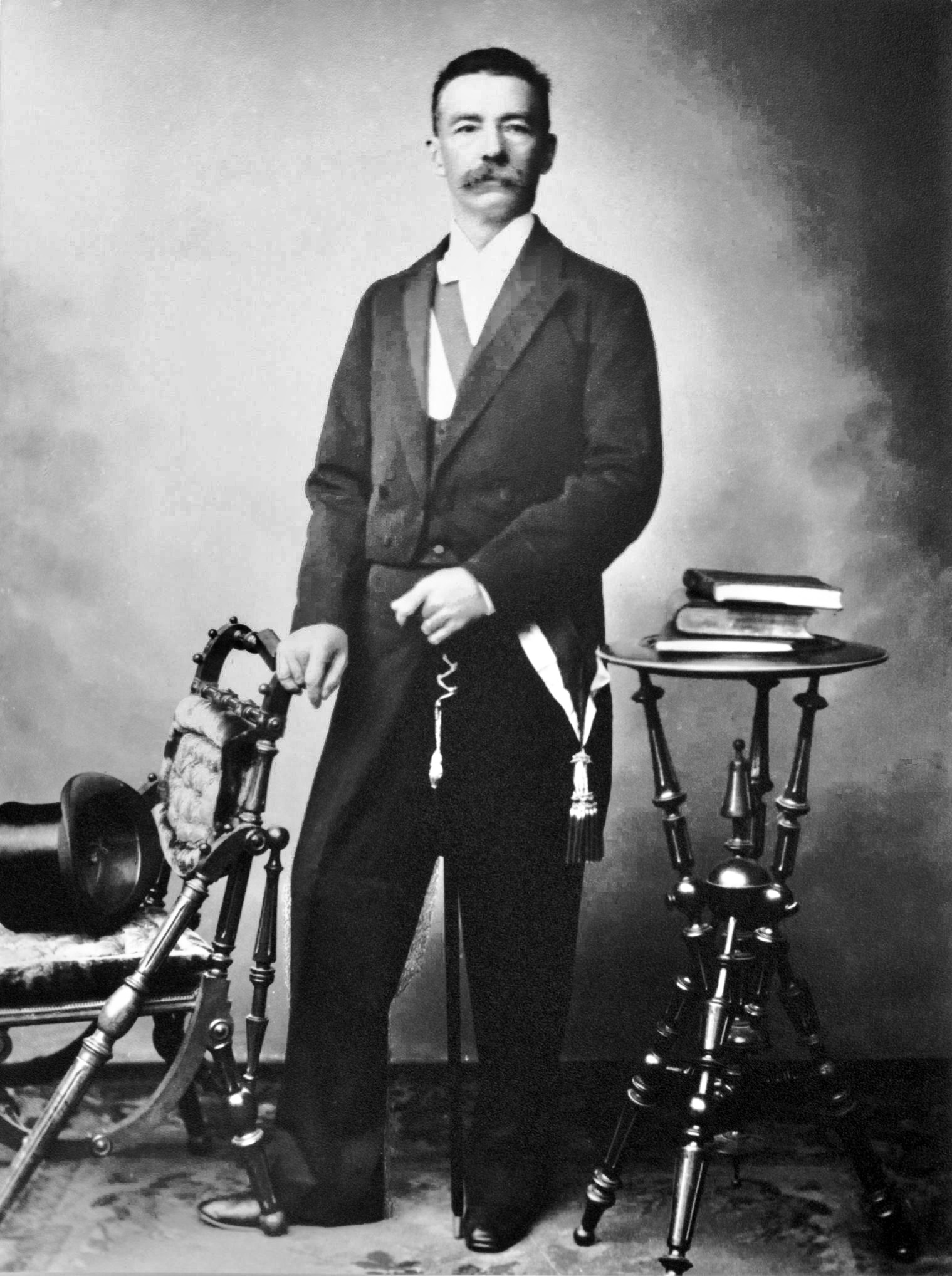

President of Peru
- In office September 8, 1899 – September 8, 1903
- Prime Minister: Manuel María Gálvez Egúsquiza; Enrique de la Riva-Agüero y Looz Corswaren; Domingo M. Almenara Butler; Cesáreo Chacaltana Reyes; Cesáreo Octavio Deustua Escarza; Eugenio Larrabure y Unanue
- Vice President: Isaac Alzamora; Federico Bresani
- Preceded by: Nicolás de Piérola
- Succeeded by: Manuel Candamo

Minister of Public Works
- In office 25 January 1896 – 8 August 1896
- President: Nicolás de Piérola
- Preceded by: Office created
- Succeeded by: Manuel J. Cuadros

1st Vice President of the Chamber of Deputies
- In office 1895–1896

Personal details
- Born: José Gabriel Eduardo Octavio López de Romaña y Alvizuri; 19 March 1847 Arequipa, Peru
- Died: 26 May 1912 (age 65) Yura, Peru
- Spouse(s): María Josefa de Castresana y García de la Arena; Julia de Castresana y García de la Arena
- Children: Eduardo, Carlos, Hortencia, Juan, Luis, Catalina, Julia, Fernando and Francisco
- Parent(s): Juan Manuel López de Romaña y Fernández Pascua; María Josefa Alvizuri y Bustamante
- Education: King's College London

Eduardo López de Romaña y Alvizuri (19 March 1847 – 26 May 1912) served as the President of Peru from September 1899 to September 1903.

A member of the landowning elite, he was the first engineer to become President of the Republic, and one of several Presidents from the era of the so-called Aristocratic Republic.

== Early years ==
López de Romaña was born in Arequipa, the son of Juan Manuel López de Romaña y Fernández Pascua and María Josefa Alvizuri y Bustamante. His father was a wealthy landowner of Spanish ancestry, owner of large haciendas and fincas in Southern Peru.

He was educated at the San Jerónimo Seminary, Arequipa, and Stonyhurst College, Lancashire. Romaña received his B.A. from King's College London in 1868 and was appointed a member of the Institution of Civil Engineers of London in 1872. He went to India and worked in the construction of the Ravi Bridge for the Punjab Northern State Railway and then to Brazil where he was employed by the Public Works Construction Company in the construction of the railroad line from the Madeira River to the Mamoré River. The climate of the Brazilian Amazon was so unhealthful that of thirty engineers engaged in the work twenty-one died before it was completed.

Upon his return to Peru in 1874, he devoted himself to the management of one of the family plantations in the Tambo Valley and worked in the fledgling agricultural development and engineering circles of the country. When the war with Chile broke out in 1879, he was appointed commanding general of the civic division of Tambo which operated in the coast of Arequipa. Having under his command three battalions, he took an active part in the expedition which stopped the Chilean Army from entering Arequipa city and compelled it to reembark at Mollendo. When the Chilean counter-attacked in 1882, they initially defeated them once again but then the city surrendered to the southern army after the provisional government was deposed.

Residing in Arequipa after the war, he was elected President of the Liberal Club and served three terms as Director of the Public Charity of the city. After Nicolás de Piérola and the National Coalition between Civilistas and Democrats triumphed in the Civil War of 1894, Romaña was elected Deputy for Arequipa in the 1895 general election and was designated First Vice-President of his chamber by the Congress. When President Piérola created the Ministry of Public Works in January 1896, he was appointed for this portfolio but his ministry lasted less than seven months because the Barinaga Cabinet fell in August of the same year. The following year he was elected Mayor of Arequipa but was compelled to resign due to a conflict of interest with the city's infrastructure projects.

In 1898 he was elected Senator for Ayacucho. By July 1899, when Piérola's administration called general election, the National Coalition offered the presidential candidacy to his brother Alejandro (former Prime Minister) but he declined in favor of Eduardo, an independent.

== President of the Republic of Peru (1899–1903) ==
During these years, Carlos de Piérola, a democrat and brother of former president Nicolás de Piérola, was the majority leader of the Chamber of Deputies, while Manuel Candamo, a civilista party leader, presided over the Senate. This division allowed for the prevalence of the democrats in the Chamber of Deputies, and for the civilistas in the Senate. These differences, however, rapidly led to the democrats leading the opposition. López de Romaña reshuffled his cabinet almost exclusively with civilistas, a move which resulted in the majority democrats of the Chamber of Deputies to continuously censure.

As a result, there were various parliamentary discords concerning the non-dismissal of censured ministers. The development in agriculture also continued during López de Romaña's term, as well as that in the mining and other related industries. The code of mining was promulgated in 1901, as well as the Code of Trade and the Code of Waters in 1902. He also created the Nueva Compañia ("New Company") for the collection of the taxes of the state. In 1901, the creation of the National Agrarian University took place under his sponsorship and that of a Belgian mission. López de Romaña faced various coup attempts whose goals were to restore former president Andrés Avelino Cáceres to the presidency, but he successfully completed his presidency in 1903. It was under his term that Peruvians coined the term "Aristocratic Republic" which continued until the second government of Augusto B. Leguía and the hegemony of the Civil Party in the government of the country.

== Death ==
Eduardo Lopez de Romaña died at the Yura mineral springs near Arequipa on May 26, 1912.

== Family ==
López de Romaña married María Josefa de Castresana y García de la Arena on 20 March 1877. The couple had three children. His wife died after the war with Chile and he remarried his former sister-in-law Julia de Castresana. They had six children.

== See also ==
- Politics of Peru
- List of presidents of Peru

Political offices
Preceded by Nicolás de Piérola	President of Peru; 1899–1903	Succeeded by Manuel Candamo
