= Héctor Boza =

Peruvian politician (1888–1974)

Héctor Boza Aizcorbe
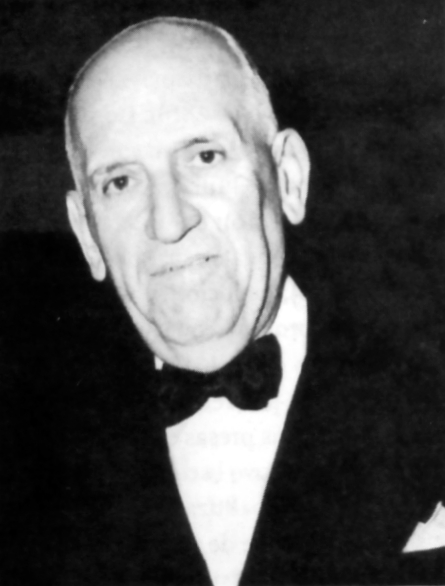

First Vice President of Peru
- In office 28 July 1950 – 28 July 1956
- President: Manuel A. Odría
- Preceded by: Vacant (Last held by José Gálvez Barrenechea in 1948)
- Succeeded by: Luis Gallo Porras

President of the Senate
- In office 28 July 1954 – 28 July 1956
- Preceded by: Julio de la Piedra
- Succeeded by: José Gálvez Barrenechea
- In office 28 July 1950 – 28 July 1951
- Preceded by: Vacant (Last held by José Gálvez Barrenechea in 1948)
- Succeeded by: Julio de la Piedra

Member of the Senate
- In office 28 July 1950 – 28 July 1956
- Constituency: Lima
- In office 28 July 1945 – 29 October 1948
- Constituency: Ica

Minister of Development and Public Works
- In office 29 October 1937 – 8 December 1939
- President: Óscar R. Benavides
- Prime Minister: Ernesto Montagne Markholz; Manuel Ugarteche Jiménez
- Preceded by: Federico Recavarren
- Succeeded by: Carlos Moreyra y Paz Soldán
- In office 13 April 1936 – 23 October 1936
- President: Óscar R. Benavides
- Prime Minister: Ernesto Montagne Markholz
- Preceded by: Manuel E. Rodríguez
- Succeeded by: Federico Recavarren
- In office 26 November 1933 – 21 May 1935
- President: Óscar R. Benavides
- Prime Minister: José de la Riva-Agüero y Osma; Carlos Arenas y Loayza
- Preceded by: Carlos Alayza y Roel
- Succeeded by: Manuel E. Rodríguez

Personal details
- Born: 12 December 1888 Lima, Peru
- Died: 14 July 1974 (aged 85) Lima, Peru
- Party: Restoration Party
- Occupation: Politician
- Profession: Engineer

Héctor C. Boza Aizcorbe (12 December 1888 – 14 July 1974) was a Peruvian engineer and politician. He was minister of Public Works and Development (1933–1935; 1936; and 1937–1939), senator for Ica (1945–1948); First Vice President of Peru (1950–1956); senator for Lima (1950–1956); and President of the Senate (1950–1951 and 1954–1956).

== Biography ==
He was the born to lawyer Benjamin Boza Filiberto (who served as a Minister of State, Senator and Mayor of Lima) and Mercedes Aizcorbe. He studied at the school founded by José Granda Esquivel and at the Lima Institute. Then he began his higher studies at the National School of Engineers (currently UNI).

In 1907, he traveled to the United States to continue his professional training. He graduated with a Bachelor of Science from Rolla Missouri School of Mines (1911); In addition to that, he studied Civil Engineering at the University of Illinois and finally received a degree in mining engineering from the University of Wisconsin (1916). He specialized in mining and metallurgy and began working in companies in the United States and Canada.

Returning to Peru, he worked in various mining companies. He was a promoter of urbanization in the country. During the second government of Óscar R. Benavides (1933–1939), he was thrice appointed Minister of Public Works and Development. His work as a minister primarily focused on road construction.

In 1945, he was elected senator from Ica. In 1946 he joined the first Peruvian delegation sent to the UN. The 1948 coup d'état resulted in the failure to complete his parliamentary term.

In the 1950 elections, he stood for the first vice president of the Republic, under the ticket of General Manuel A. Odría, who handily won the elections, as he did not have any opposition. Simultaneously, He was elected senator for Lima (1950–1956). He chaired the Senate in 1950–1951 and 1954–1956.

During Manuel Prado Ugarteche's second government, he was appointed ambassador to France (1956–1962).

== Bibliography ==
- Tauro del Pino, Alberto: Enciclopedia Ilustrada del Perú. Third Edition. Volume 3, BEI/CAN. Lima, PEISA, 2001. ISBN 9972-40-152-5
- Portal del Congreso del Perú: Presidente del Senado / Héctor Boza.
- El Mariscal Benavides, su vida y su obra. Lima, Editorial Atlántida, 2 volúmenes. 1976, 1981.
