= Eugenio Larrabure y Unanue =

Peruvian politician, historian and journalist (1844–1916)

Manuel Eugenio Larrabure y Unanue (19 January 1844 – 12 May 1916) was a Peruvian politician, diplomat, writer, historian and journalist. He was thrice Minister of Foreign Affairs (1883 - 1884, 1892 - 1893 and 1902 - 1903), Minister of Development and Public Works (1901 - 1902), President of the Council of Ministers (1902–1903) and First Vice President (1908 - 1912).

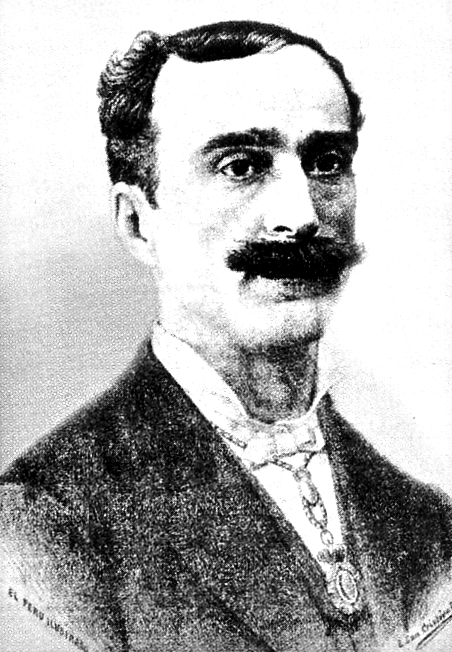
Eugenio Larrabure y Unanue

== Biography ==
He was born to Eugène Larrabure Domestoy and Rosa María Michaela Unanue. He was grandson of the renowned doctor José Hipólito Unanue y Pavón. Hipólito was also a prominent hero of Peruvian independence. He studied at various institutions, including the French Institute.

He started his career as a journalist. During the Peruvian presidential elections of 1871–1872, he edited the newspaper La República. Through the paper, he voiced support for the presidential candidacy of lawyer Manuel Toribio Ureta.

In 1877 he became director of the official newspaper El Peruano. In that position, he added the coverage of science and culture in official publications and documents. In the same year, he was appointed head of the Diplomatic Section in the Ministry of Foreign Affairs. He was soon promoted to senior officer in 1878 and in the following year, he was appointed in Spain as secretary of the legation led by José Joaquín de Osma, whom he later replaced as Chargé d'Affaires.

After returning to Peru, he was appointed Minister of Foreign Affairs in the government of General Miguel Iglesias (1883-1884) and was responsible for the coordination of everything related to the initial implementation of the recently signed Treaty of Ancón with Chile, together with the signatories Jose Antonio de Lavalle and Mariano Castro Zaldívar.

In 1885, he was elected president of the Literary Club, which, under his auspices became the Lima Athenaeum. Later he expanded his field of study in scientific phenomena. He founded the magazine El Ateneo de Lima (1886 - 1889), in whose pages, he published studies on literature and history. In 1887, he carried out a vigorous campaign against the approval of the Grace Contract (1887) in the Peruvian press. He upheld the belief that Chile was the one who had to pay the external debt of Peru.

During the government of Colonel Remigio Morales Bermúdez, he was again appointed Minister of Foreign Affairs (1892 - 1893) The office vested him (along with plenipotentiaries like José Mariano Jiménez Wald and Ramón Ribeyro), with the duty of initiation of negotiations to hold the plebiscite of Tacna and Arica, as required by the Treaty of Ancón.

During the government of President Eduardo López de Romaña, he was Minister of Public Works and Development (1901 - 1902), and at that time, he promoted the foundation of the National School of Agriculture, what is today the National Agrarian University of La Molina. For the third time, he assumed the post of Minister of Foreign Relations, as well as President of the Council of Ministers (1902 - 1903).

He temporarily retired from public activity and dedicated himself to the development and agricultural exploration of his Unanue estate, located in the Cañete valley, which is currently considered an integral monument of the Cultural Heritage of Peru. He was also one of the founding members of the Historical Institute of Peru. He served as its first president between 1905 and 1916.

He was appointed the minister plenipotentiary in Brazil (1905 - 1908). Then he was elected first Vice President of the Republic of the first government of Augusto Leguía (1908 - 1912). He also attended the celebration of the first centenary of Argentina's independence (1910).

== Bibliography ==
- Basadre, Jorge: Historia de la República del Perú. 1822 - 1933, Eighth Edition, amended and expanded. Volumes 9 and 10. Edited for the newspaper "La República" of Lima and the University "Ricardo Palma". Published in Santiago, Chile, 1998.
- Tauro del Pino, Alberto: Enciclopedia Ilustrada del Perú. Third Edition. Volume 9, JAB/LLO. Lima, PEISA, 2001. ISBN 9972-40-158-8
