= List of ambassadors of Peru to Spain =

Ambassador of Peru to the Kingdom of Spain
- Great Seal of Peru
- Ministry of Foreign Affairs; Calle Zurbano 70, Madrid
- Appointer: The president of Peru
- Inaugural holder: José A. Páez (not recognized)
- Formation: 1826
- Website: Embassy of Peru in Spain

The extraordinary and plenipotentiary ambassador of Peru to the Kingdom of Spain is the official representative of the Republic of Peru to the Kingdom of Spain, being also accredited to the Principality of Andorra.

Peru and Spain officially established relations in August 15, 1879, under Alfonso XII and have since maintained diplomatic relations with a brief exception during the years 1936 to 1939 as a result of the Spanish Civil War.

Andorra and Peru officially established relations on June 3, 1997.

== List of representatives ==
Name	Portrait	Term begin	Term end	President	Notes
José A. Páez		1826	?	Simón Bolívar	Consul in Valencia (not recognized)
José Fabio Melgar Valdivieso; Felipe Pardo y Aliaga		1835	?	Felipe Santiago Salaverry	Melgar was sent as Legation Secretary to negotiate a Spanish recognition of Peru's sovereignty. He was unsuccessful.
Joaquín José de Osma		1843	1845	Manuel Ignacio de Vivanco	As Envoy Extraordinary and Minister Plenipotentiary (not recognized)
Juan Manuel Iturregui		1845	?	Manuel Menéndez	As Secretary/Plenipotentiary (not recognized)
José de la Riva-Agüero y Looz-Corswarem		1852	1853	José Rufino Echenique	As Attachment to the Legation (not recognized)
Joaquín José de Osma		1853	1855	José Rufino Echenique	As Minister Plenipotentiary
Pedro Gálvez Egúsquiza		1859	?	Ramón Castilla	As Envoy Extraordinary and Minister Plenipotentiary
Manuel Ignacio de Vivanco		1863	?	Miguel de San Román	As Envoy Extraordinary and Minister Plenipotentiary
Domingo del Valle y Riestra		1865	?	Juan Antonio Pezet	As Envoy Extraordinary and Minister Plenipotentiary
Juan Mariano de Goyeneche		1879	1880	Mariano Ignacio Prado	As Envoy Extraordinary and Minister Plenipotentiary; 3rd Count of Guaqui. Spain recognized and established bilateral relations with Peru during his tenure.
1879: Diplomatic relations formally established between Peru and Spain
Joaquín José de Osma		1880	1881	Nicolás de Piérola	As Envoy Extraordinary and Minister Plenipotentiary
Eugenio Larrabure y Unanue		1881	1881	Francisco García Calderón	As First secretary
Juan Mariano de Goyeneche		1881	1884	Disputed	During this period, Peru was occupied by Chile. During the occupation of the capital, a peace treaty was signed between Chile and Spain that put an end to the state of war that existed between both states since the Chincha Islands War.
Joaquín José de Osma		1887	1889	Andrés Avelino Cáceres	
José Alayza y Rivero		1890	1890	Andrés Avelino Cáceres	As Military Attaché to the Legation
Pedro Alejandrino del Solar		1891	1894	Andrés Avelino Cáceres	As Envoy Extraordinary and Minister Plenipotentiary
José Francisco Canevaro		1900	1900	Eduardo López de Romaña	As Envoy Extraordinary and Minister Plenipotentiary. 2nd Count of Zoagli
Felipe de Osma y Pardo		April 24, 1904	March 1911	Manuel Candamo	Concurrent with his time as Argentine minister.
Enrique de la Riva-Agüero y Looz Corswaren		1913	1915	Guillermo Billinghurst	As Envoy Extraordinary and Minister Plenipotentiary
E. Maúrtua		1916	1917	José Pardo y Barreda	As First Secretary
Anselmo V. Barreto		1920	1922	Augusto B. Leguía	As Envoy Extraordinary and Minister Plenipotentiary
Guillermo José Manuel Swayne y Mendoza		1922	1924	Augusto B. Leguía	As Chargé d'affaires
Eduardo Leguía		1924	1930	Augusto B. Leguía	As Envoy Extraordinary and Minister Plenipotentiary
Óscar R. Benavides		October 3, 1930	1932	Luis Miguel Sánchez Cerro	As Envoy Extraordinary and Minister Plenipotentiary
Juan de Osma y Pardo		1932	1937	Luis Miguel Sánchez Cerro	As Envoy Extraordinary and Minister Plenipotentiary. Last representative of Peru before bilateral relations were severed due to the Spanish Civil War.
Francisco Tudela y Varela		1939	1940	Óscar R. Benavides	As Envoy Extraordinary and Minister Plenipotentiary. First representative of Peru to the new Spanish State.
Óscar R. Benavides		1941	1941	Manuel Prado y Ugarteche	As Ambassador
Pedro Yrigoyen Diez Canseco		1941	1943	Manuel Prado y Ugarteche	
Ricardo Rivera Schreiber		1943	1945	Manuel Prado y Ugarteche	As Ambassador; Knight of the Order of Malta.
Gonzalo Pizarro		1946	1946	José Luis Bustamante y Rivero	As Counselor charge d'affaires
José Orville Pérez Villarreal		1947	1947	José Luis Bustamante y Rivero	As Third Secretary
Raúl Porras Barrenechea		1948	1949	José Luis Bustamante y Rivero	
Eloy G. Ureta		1949	1955	Manuel A. Odría	As Extraordinary and Plenipotentiary Ambassador
Felipe Portocarrero Olave		1956	1958	Manuel A. Odría	As chargé d'affaires. Died 2012 in Madrid.
Manuel Cisneros Sánchez		1958	1959	Manuel Prado y Ugarteche	As Ambassador.
Felipe Portocarrero Olave		1960	1961	Manuel Prado y Ugarteche	As chargé d'affaires
Carlos Neuhaus Ugarteche		1961	1962	Manuel Prado y Ugarteche	As Ambassador.
Jaime Cacho-Sousa y Castro		1963	1963	Ricardo Pérez Godoy	As First Secretary and Chargé d'Affaires
Nicolás Lindley López		1964	1975	Fernando Belaúnde Terry	As Ambassador.
Carlos Vásquez Ayllón		1976	1979	Francisco Morales Bermúdez	As Ambassador. First representative of Peru after the death of Francisco Franco.
Guillermo Arbulú Galliani		1979	1981	Francisco Morales Bermúdez	As Ambassador
Miguel Mujica Gallo		1981	1985	Fernando Belaúnde Terry	As Ambassador
Juan José Calle y Calle		1986	1988	Alan García	As Ambassador
Allan Wagner Tizón		1988	1991	Alan García	As Ambassador
Eduardo Toledo Gonzales		1991	1993	Alberto Fujimori	As Ambassador
Roberto Villarán Koechlin		1993	1996	Alberto Fujimori	As Ambassador
Fernando Vega Santa Gadea		March 26, 1996	October 16, 1997	Alberto Fujimori	As Ambassador
Armando Lecaros de Cossío		1998	2000	Alberto Fujimori	As Ambassador
Carlos Pareja Ríos		2000	2002	Valentín Paniagua	As Ambassador
Fernando Olivera		November 27, 2002	August 11, 2005	Alejandro Toledo	As Ambassador
Armando Lecaros de Cossío		2005	2006	Alejandro Toledo	As Ambassador
José Luis Pérez Sánchez-Cerro		2006	2009	Alan García	As Ambassador
Jaime Cáceres Sayán		2009	2011	Alan García	As Ambassador
Francisco Eguiguren Praeli		January 20, 2012	July 17, 2014	Ollanta Humala	As Ambassador
Rafael Roncagliolo		2015	2016	Ollanta Humala	As Ambassador
José Antonio García Belaúnde		2016	2019	Pedro Pablo Kuczynski	As Ambassador
Claudio de la Puente Ribeyro		January 24, 2019	2022	Martín Vizcarra	As Ambassador
Óscar Maúrtua		2022	December 7, 2022	Pedro Castillo	As Ambassador. He quit as Ambassador to Spain, Andorra and as representative to the World Tourism Organization due to the 2022 Peruvian self-coup attempt.
Walter Gutiérrez		March 2023	October 2025	Dina Boluarte	As ambassador

== See also ==
- List of ambassadors of Spain to Peru
- List of ambassadors of Peru to Morocco
- List of ambassadors of Peru to Portugal
