= Ministry of Foreign Affairs (Peru) =

Government ministry of Peru

Ministerio de Relaciones Exteriores Ministry of Foreign Affairs
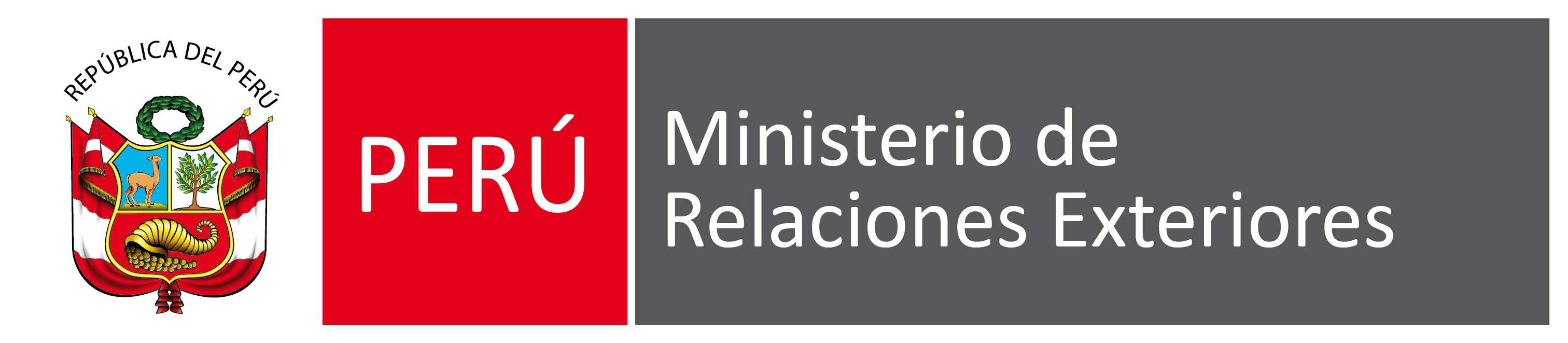

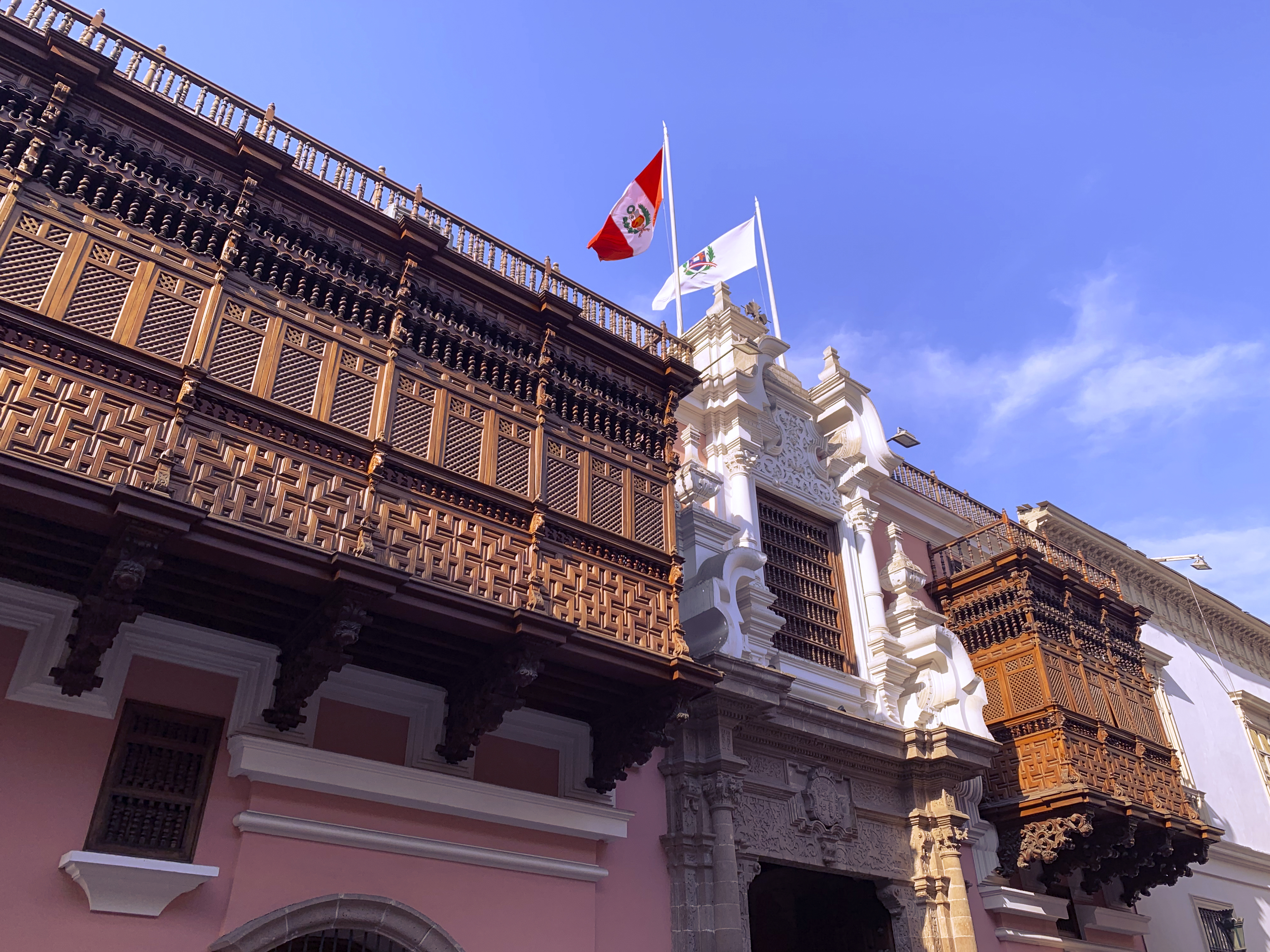
- Torre Tagle Palace

Ministry overview
- Formed: 3 August 1821
- Preceding Ministry: Ministry of Foreign Affairs and Public Instruction
- Jurisdiction: Peru
- Headquarters: Torre Tagle Palace, Jirón Lampa 580, Lima; 12°02′56″S 77°01′46″W
- Minister responsible: Carlos Espá, Foreign Minister
- Ministry executives: Luis Enrique Chávez Basagoitia, Deputy Minister; Luis Alberto Castro Joo, Secretary General
- Website: www.gob.pe/rree

The Ministry of Foreign Affairs of Peru (Spanish: Ministerio de Relaciones Exteriores, MRE) is the government ministry in charge of foreign policy and international relations and cooperation of Peru. It works in coordination with the country's diplomatic network, accredited to different countries and international organizations. In the same way, it also works with the diplomatic body in the country accredited to the Peruvian State.

== History ==
On August 3, 1821, just six days after proclaiming Peru's independence, José de San Martín created three Secretariats of State (this date is commemorated annually as Diplomat's Day):

- The Secretariat of State and Foreign Affairs (Secretaría de Estado y Relaciones Exteriores), headed by Juan García del Río.
- The Secretariat of War and the Navy, headed by Lieutenant Colonel Bernardo de Monteagudo
- The Secretariat of Finance, headed by Dr. Hipólito Unanue.

Two years later, Peru's first Political Constitution, promulgated on November 12, 1823, consolidated the existence of these three secretariats, giving them the name "ministry" (ministerio).

On March 21, 1824, Simón Bolívar issued a decree in Trujillo reducing the three ministries to a single one, which would become the General Secretariat of Affairs of the Peruvian Republic (Secretaría General de los Negocios de la República Peruana), under Colonel José Gabriel Pérez. However, shortly thereafter, the Governing Junta repealed the decree, reestablishing the three ministries.

On June 1, 1826, José de la Mar, following Bolívar's orders, decreed the creation of six Secretariats of State: Foreign Affairs; Justice and Ecclesiastical Affairs; Interior; Treasury; War, and Navy. These six secretariats were to be distributed among four Ministries: Foreign Affairs and Interior; Justice and Ecclesiastical Affairs; Treasury; and War and Navy. At the end of that same year, Bolívar drafted his Lifetime Constitution, which was sworn in on December 9 and changed the names of the ministries to Secretariat Offices (Secretarías de Despacho).

After Bolívar left Peru, La Mar issued a new Constitution. Under this Constitution, only three Ministries of State were established: one of Government and Foreign Affairs; another of War and Navy; and another of Finance. This Constitution was replaced in 1834, and during the government of General Luis José de Orbegoso, the administration of the three Ministries was to be consolidated into a General Secretariat. Later, during the brief administration of General Felipe Salaverry, the three Ministries created by San Martín in 1821 were reinstated.

Once the Peru–Bolivian Confederation was established, Andrés de Santa Cruz ordered these three Ministries to be in charge of the Confederation's affairs. Following the fall of the Confederation, the Constitution of 1839 was enacted, and a fourth Ministry was added: the Ministry of Public Instruction, Charity, and Ecclesiastical Affairs. In the following years, a General Ministry was once again created, but it was abolished in August 1844, reestablishing only two Ministries: the Ministry of Government and Foreign Affairs, and the Ministry of Finance.

In April 1845, during the government of Ramón Castilla, four ministries were reestablished: Foreign Affairs; Government; War and Navy; and Finance. By Decree No. 90 of July 31, 1846, Castilla created the Peruvian Diplomatic Service (Servicio Diplomático del Perú). In June 1855, the Ministry was organized as the Ministry of Foreign Affairs and Public Education. The following year, in November 1856, the Constitution established that there would normally be five Ministries: Foreign Affairs; Government, Worship, and Public Works; Justice, Education, and Charity; War and Navy; and Finance and Commerce.

In March 1857, the Foreign Ministry was internally organized into two sections: the Overseas and Continental sections. In April 1878, during Mariano Ignacio Prado's second administration, the Ministry of Foreign Affairs was reorganised. Under this arrangement, the Ministry was divided into two sections: the Diplomatic Section, and the Consulates, Chancery, and Accounting Sections, replacing the Overseas and Continental sections, respectively.

Following the aforementioned modifications, a series of measures were enacted from 1903 to 2006 regarding the internal organization of the Ministry of Foreign Affairs.

By Supreme Decree 025-2007-Re of April 20, 2007, the Peruvian Antarctic Institute became part of the Ministry of Foreign Affairs.

== Organisation ==
According to the Organization and Functions Regulation, the Ministry has the following directorates:

- Directorate-General of Foreign Policy Studies and Strategies
- Directorate-General of America
- Directorate-General of Sovereignty, Limits and Antarctic Affairs
- Directorate-General of Europe
- Directorate-General of Asia and Oceania
- Directorate-General of Africa, Middle East and Gulf countries
- Directorate-General for Multilateral and Global Affairs
- Directorate-General for Economic Affairs
- Directorate-General of Economic Promotion
- Directorate-General of Peruvian Communities Abroad and Consular Affairs
- Directorate-General for Cultural Affairs
- Directorate-General of Treaties
- Directorate-General of Protocol and Ceremonial of the State

Entities administered by the ministry include:

- Peruvian Agency for International Cooperation (APCI)
- Peruvian Antarctic Institute (IAP)

== List of ministers ==
Name	Period	
Name	Term start	Term end
Secretaries of State for Government and Foreign Affairs (1821–1823)
Juan García del Río	February 12, 1821	October 25, 1821
Bernardo de Monteagudo	October 25, 1821	July 26, 1822
Francisco Valdivieso	July 26, 1822	August 18, 1823
Ministers of State and Foreign Relations (1823–1826)
Juan de Berindoaga	August 18, 1823	January 20, 1824
Hipólito Unanue	January 20, 1824	April 3, 1824
José Faustino Sánchez Carrión	April 3, 1824	February 26, 1825
Hipólito Unanue	February 26, 1825	April 3, 1825
Tomás de Heres	April 3, 1825	June 19, 1825
José de Morales y Ugalde	June 19, 1825	June 28, 1825
Hipólito Unanue	June 28, 1825	September 15, 1825
Manuel Ruiz de Pancorvo	September 15, 1825	December 15, 1825
José Serra	December 15, 1825	May 18, 1826
Ministers of Relations and the Interior (1826–1827)
José María Pando de la Riva	May 18, 1826	January 30, 1827
Ministers of Government and Foreign Relations (1827–1834)
Manuel Lorenzo de Vidaurre	January 30, 1827	May 16, 1827
Manuel del Río	May 16, 1827	June 24, 1827
Francisco Javier Mariátegui	June 24, 1827	May 19, 1828
José María Galdeano	May 19, 1828	May 26, 1828
Manuel del Río	May 26, 1828	October 14, 1828
Justo Figuerola	October 14, 1828	June 7, 1829
Mariano Alejo Álvarez	June 7, 1829	October 16, 1829
José de Armas	October 16, 1829	December 31, 1829
José María Pando de la Riva	December 31, 1829	July 20, 1830
Matías León	July 20, 1830	August 12, 1830
Carlos Pedemonte y Talavera	August 4, 1830	August 9, 1831
Matías León	August 11, 1831	January 31, 1832
Manuel Lorenzo de Vidaurre	January 31, 1832	June 1, 1832
José María Pando de la Riva	June 1, 1832	July 29, 1832
Manuel del Río	July 29, 1832	October 5, 1832
Nicolás de Araníbar	October 5, 1832	November 13, 1832
Manuel del Río	November 13, 1832	December 31, 1832
José María Pando de la Riva	December 31, 1832	April 11, 1833
Manuel del Río	April 11, 1833	December 31, 1833
Ministers of Foreign Relations (1834–1844)
José María Pando de la Riva	January 4, 1834	April 24, 1834
José María Corbacho	February 4, 1834	May 13, 1834
Matías León	May 15, 1834	February 22, 1835
José Domingo Espinar	February 26, 1835	March 1, 1835
Bonifacio Lazarte	March 1, 1835	May 20, 1835
Manuel Bartolomé Ferreyros	May 20, 1835	June 24, 1835
Ildefonso Zavala	June 24, 1835	September 22, 1835
Mariano de Sierra	September 22, 1835	September 29, 1835
Andrés María Torrico	September 29, 1835	March 21, 1836
Mariano Campero	March 21, 1836	August 17, 1836
Pío de Tristán	August 17, 1836	March 6, 1837
José María Galdeano	March 6, 1837	March 12, 1837
Casimiro Olañeta	March 12, 1837	March 13, 1838
Manuel de la Cruz Méndez	March 13, 1838	August 25, 1838
Benito Laso	August 25, 1838	November 8, 1838
Ramón Castilla	November 8, 1838	July 29, 1839
Benito Laso	July 29, 1839	November 13, 1839
Manuel del Río	November 13, 1839	November 23, 1839
Manuel Bartolomé Ferreyros	November 23, 1839	July 12, 1841
Manuel Pérez de Tudela	July 12, 1841	October 14, 1841
Agustín Guillermo Charún	October 14, 1841	February 11, 1843
José Dávila Condemarín	February 11, 1843	March 16, 1843
Matías León	March 16, 1843	April 7, 1843
José Luis Gómez Sánchez	April 7, 1843	May 30, 1843
Manuel Ros	May 30, 1843	June 11, 1843
Felipe Pardo y Aliaga	June 11, 1843	June 17, 1844
Ministers of Foreign Relations, Justice and Eclessiastical Affairs (1844–1845)
José Manuel Tirado	June 17, 1844	August 11, 1844
José Fabio Melgar	August 19, 1844	August 27, 1844
José Dávila Condemarín	August 27, 1844	September 18, 1844
Manuel Pérez de Tudela	September 18, 1844	October 7, 1844
Matías León	October 7, 1844	February 17, 1845
Ministers of Foreign Relations (1845–1852)
José Dávila Condemarín	February 17, 1845	March 5, 1845
Matías León	March 5, 1845	April 20, 1845
José Dávila Condemarín	April 20, 1845	May 19, 1845
José Gregorio Paz Soldán	May 19, 1845	April 6, 1847
Manuel del Río	April 6, 1847	April 21, 1847
José Gregorio Paz Soldán	April 21, 1847	January 29, 1848
Matías León	January 29, 1848	February 21, 1848
Mariano José Sanz León	February 21, 1848	March 28, 1848
Felipe Pardo y Aliaga	March 28, 1848	April 20, 1849
Juan Crisóstomo Torrico	April 20, 1849	August 4, 1849
Mariano José Sanz León	August 4, 1849	August 25, 1849
Manuel Bartolomé Ferreyros	August 25, 1849	April 20, 1851
Ministers of Government and Foreign Relations (1852–1855)
Juan Crisóstomo Torrico	April 20, 1851	February 5, 1852
Joaquín José de Osma	February 5, 1852	September 1, 1852
Bartolomé Herrera	September 1, 1852	August 7, 1853
José Manuel Tirado	August 7, 1853	November 9, 1853
José Gregorio Paz Soldán	November 9, 1853	April 25, 1854
José Luis Gómez Sánchez	April 25, 1854	January 5, 1855
Ministers of Foreign Relations and Public Instruction (1855–1856)
Manuel Toribio Ureta	January 5, 1855	September 6, 1855
Francisco Quirós y Ampudia	September 6, 1855	February 1, 1856
José María Seguín	February 1, 1856	January 26, 1857
Ministers of Foreign Affairs
Mariano Felipe Paz Soldán	January 26, 1857	October 2, 1857
José Fabio Melgar Valdivieso	October 2, 1857	February 14, 1858
Manuel Ortiz de Zevallos	February 14, 1858	December 21, 1858
Antonio Arenas	December 21, 1858	January 14, 1859
Manuel Morales	January 14, 1859	March 18, 1859
José Fabio Melgar Valdivieso	March 18, 1859	September 15, 1859
Miguel del Carpio y Melgar	September 15, 1859	June 13, 1860
José Fabio Melgar Valdivieso	June 13, 1860	November 25, 1861
Juan Oviedo	November 25, 1861	January 25, 1862
Juan Antonio Ribeyro Estrada	January 25, 1862	October 27, 1862
José Gregorio Paz Soldán	October 27, 1862	April 9, 1863
Juan Antonio Ribeyro Estrada	April 10, 1863	August 10, 1864
Toribio Pacheco y Rivero	August 11, 1864	September 26, 1864
José Simeón Tejeda	September 26, 1864	1864
Toribio Pacheco y Rivero	October 3, 1864	October 14, 1864
Pedro José Calderón	October 14, 1864	November 6, 1865
José Manuel de la Puente	September 26, 1865	November 27, 1865
Toribio Pacheco y Rivero	November 27, 1865	March 7, 1867
Simeón Gregorio Paredes	March 7, 1867	May 4, 1867
José Antonio Barrenechea y Morales	May 4, 1867	June 3, 1867
Luis Mesones	June 3, 1867	June 8, 1867
Felipe Osorio	June 8, 1867	September 4, 1867
José Antonio Barrenechea y Morales	September 4, 1867	January 7, 1868
Juan Manuel Polar y Carasas	January 25, 1868	August 4, 1868
José Antonio Barrenechea y Morales	August 4, 1868	October 23, 1869
Mariano Dorado	October 26, 1869	May 27, 1870
José Jorge Loayza	May 27, 1870	July 26, 1872
Juan Antonio Ribeyro Estrada	July 26, 1872	August 7, 1872
José de la Riva-Agüero y Looz-Corswarem	August 7, 1872	April 13, 1874
José Eusebio Sánchez Pedraza	April 13, 1874	August 7, 1874
José de la Riva-Agüero y Looz-Corswarem	August 7, 1874	February 13, 1875
José Antonio García y García	February 13, 1875	March 10, 1875
Aníbal Víctor de la Torre	March 10, 1875	August 2, 1876
José Antonio García y García	August 2, 1876	June 8, 1877
José Cirilo Julio Rospigliosi	June 8, 1877	March 18, 1878
Manuel Morales	March 18, 1878	March 29, 1878
José Cirilo Julio Rospigliosi	March 29, 1878	June 19, 1878
Manuel Yrigoyen Arias	June 19, 1878	May 20, 1879
Mariano Felipe Paz Soldán	May 20, 1879	May 23, 1879
Manuel Yrigoyen Arias	May 23, 1879	October 17, 1879
Juan E. Guzmán	October 17, 1879	October 29, 1879
Manuel Yrigoyen Arias	October 29, 1879	November 2, 1879
Rafael Velarde Echevarría	November 2, 1879	December 11, 1879
Alfonso Quiroga	December 11, 1879	December 23, 1879
Pedro José Calderón	December 23, 1879	January 17, 1881
Aurelio García y García	January 17, 1881	March 12, 1881
Manuel María Gálvez Egúsquiza	March 12, 1881	November 6, 1881
Aurelio García y García	October 30, 1881	November 28, 1881
Rafael Villanueva Cortez	November 15, 1881	January 4, 1882
Juan Manuel Arbaiza	January 4, 1882	July 16, 1882
Mariano Santos Álvarez Villegas	July 16, 1882	September 4, 1882
Manuel María del Valle	September 4, 1882	September 4, 1882
Epifanio Serpa Arana	September 4, 1882	October 10, 1882
Mariano Valcárcel	October 10, 1882	October 1883
Francisco Flores Chinarro	January 5, 1883	January 5, 1883
Lorenzo Iglesias	January 5, 1883	September 15, 1883
José Antonio de Lavalle	September 15, 1883	September 16, 1883
Elías Malpartida	September 16, 1883	October 23, 1883
José Antonio de Lavalle	October 23, 1883	November 20, 1883
Eugenio Larrabure y Unanue	November 20, 1883	March 21, 1884
Mariano Castro Zaldívar	March 21, 1884	April 9, 1884
Baltasar García Urrutia	April 9, 1884	December 2, 1885
Antonio Arenas	December 2, 1885	June 3, 1886
Manuel María Rivas Pereira	June 3, 1886	October 6, 1886
Ramón Ribeyro	October 6, 1886	November 22, 1886
Cesáreo Chacaltana Reyes	November 22, 1886	August 22, 1887
Carlos Maria Elías y de la Quintana	August 22, 1887	October 4, 1887
Domingo de Vivero	October 4, 1887	November 9, 1887
Alberto Elmore Fernández de Córdoba	November 9, 1887	April 26, 1888
Antenor Arias	April 26, 1888	April 4, 1889
Manuel Yrigoyen Arias	April 4, 1889	August 10, 1890
Alberto Elmore Fernández de Córdoba	August 11, 1890	August 24, 1891
Juan Federico Elmore	August 24, 1891	June 30, 1892
Eugenio Larrabure y Unanue	June 30, 1892	January 4, 1893
Ramón Ribeyro	January 4, 1893	March 3, 1893
Cesáreo Chacaltana Reyes	March 3, 1893	May 11, 1893
José Mariano Jiménez Wald	May 11, 1893	April 1, 1894
Baltasar García Urrutia	April 2, 1894	August 10, 1894
Manuel Yrigoyen Arias	August 10, 1894	March 20, 1895
Manuel Candamo	March 20, 1895	September 8, 1895
Melitón Porras Osores	September 8, 1895	November 30, 1895
Ricardo Ortiz de Zevallos y Tagle	November 30, 1895	August 8, 1896
Enrique de la Riva-Agüero y Riglos	August 8, 1896	May 16, 1898
José Jorge Loayza	May 16, 1898	June 6, 1898
Melitón Porras Osores	June 6, 1898	September 8, 1899
Manuel María Gálvez Egúsquiza	September 8, 1899	December 14, 1899
Enrique de la Riva-Agüero y Riglos	December 14, 1899	August 31, 1900
Felipe de Osma y Pardo	August 31, 1900	September 3, 1901
Anselmo Barreto	September 3, 1901	September 11, 1901
Cesáreo Chacaltana Reyes	September 11, 1901	August 10, 1902
Aníbal Villegas	August 10, 1902	November 4, 1902
Eugenio Larrabure y Unanue	November 4, 1902	September 8, 1903
José Pardo y Barreda	September 8, 1903	May 14, 1904
Alberto Elmore Fernández de Córdoba	May 14, 1904	September 25, 1904
Solón Polo	September 25, 1904	December 29, 1905
Javier Prado y Ugarteche	December 29, 1905	December 14, 1906
Solón Polo	December 14, 1906	September 25, 1908
Melitón Porras Osores	September 25, 1908	December 28, 1910
Emilio de Althaus	December 28, 1910	January 23, 1911
Germán Leguía y Martínez	January 23, 1911	September 24, 1912
Wenceslao Valera Olano	September 24, 1912	June 17, 1913
Francisco Tudela y Varela	June 17, 1913	December 24, 1913
Emilio de Althaus	December 24, 1913	February 4, 1914
José Matías Manzanilla	February 4, 1914	May 15, 1914
Fernando Gazzani	May 15, 1914	February 19, 1915
Solón Polo	February 19, 1915	August 18, 1915
Enrique de la Riva-Agüero y Riglos	August 18, 1915	July 27, 1917
Francisco Tudela y Varela	July 27, 1917	December 6, 1918
Ricardo Flores Gaviño	December 6, 1918	December 18, 1918
Arturo García Salazar	December 18, 1918	July 4, 1919
Melitón Porras Osores	July 4, 1919	August 31, 1920
Germán Leguía y Martínez	August 31, 1920	October 1, 1920
Alberto Salomón Osorio	October 1, 1920	March 18, 1921
Germán Leguía y Martínez	March 18, 1921	April 4, 1921
Alberto Salomón Osorio	April 4, 1921	February 27, 1924
Julio Ego-Aguirre	February 27, 1924	April 29, 1924
Alberto Salomón Osorio	April 29, 1924	May 4, 1924
César Elguera	May 4, 1924	October 12, 1924
Alberto Salomón Osorio	October 12, 1924	June 19, 1925
César Elguera	June 19, 1925	September 25, 1926
Pedro José Rada y Gamio	September 25, 1926	March 6, 1930
Pedro M. Oliveira	March 6, 1930	August 24, 1930
Julio Goicochea Álvarez	August 24, 1930; August 25, 1930	August 25, 1930; August 27, 1930
Ernesto Montagne Markholz	August 28, 1930	March 11, 1931
Rafael Larco Herrera	March 11, 1931	July 25, 1931
José Gálvez Barrenechea	July 25, 1931	December 8, 1931
Luis Miró Quesada	December 8, 1931	January 29, 1932
Alberto Freundt Rosell	January 29, 1932	September 10, 1932
Carlos Zavala Loayza	September 10, 1932	December 24, 1932
José Matías Manzanilla	December 24, 1932; June 30, 1933	June 30, 1933; June 26, 1933
Solón Polo	June 30, 1933	September 5, 1934
Alberto Rey de Castro y Romaña	September 5, 1934	September 14, 1934
Carlos Concha Cárdenas	September 14, 1934	June 8, 1935
Fernando Tola Cires	June 8, 1935	July 8, 1935
Carlos Concha Cárdenas	July 8, 1935	April 13, 1936
Alberto Ulloa Sotomayor	April 13, 1936	May 24, 1936
Diómedes Arias Schreiber	May 24, 1936	June 3, 1936
Alberto Ulloa Sotomayor	June 3, 1936	October 22, 1936
César Augusto de la Fuente Álvarez	October 22, 1936	October 30, 1937
Carlos Concha Cárdenas	October 30, 1937	October 30, 1937
Diómedes Arias Schreiber	October 30, 1937	November 20, 1937
Carlos Concha Cárdenas	November 20, 1937	April 20, 1939
Enrique Goytisolo Bolognesi	April 20, 1939	September 13, 1939
José Félix Aramburú Salinas	September 13, 1939	October 5, 1939
Enrique Goytisolo Bolognesi	October 5, 1939	December 9, 1939
Alfredo Solf y Muro	December 9, 1939	January 5, 1942
Lino Cornejo Zegarra	January 5, 1942	February 6, 1942
Alfredo Solf y Muro	February 6, 1942	December 9, 1944
Manuel Gallagher Canaval	December 9, 1944	February 19, 1945
Manuel Cisneros Sánchez	February 19, 1945	March 12, 1945
Manuel Gallagher Canaval	March 12, 1945	April 24, 1945
Manuel Cisneros Sánchez	April 24, 1945	May 24, 1945
Manuel Gallagher Canaval	May 24, 1945	May 28, 1945
Manuel Cisneros Sánchez	May 28, 1945	July 3, 1945
Manuel Gallagher Canaval	July 3, 1945	July 28, 1945
Javier Correa Elías	July 28, 1945	January 24, 1946
Enrique García Sayán	January 24, 1946	May 31, 1946
Ismael Bielich-Flores	May 31, 1946	June 26, 1946
Enrique García Sayán	June 26, 1946	August 5, 1946
Ismael Bielich-Flores	August 5, 1946	August 13, 1946
Enrique García Sayán	August 13, 1946	July 7, 1947
Luis Echecopar García	July 7, 1947	July 24, 1947
Enrique García Sayán	July 24, 1947	August 12, 1947
Luis Echecopar García	August 12, 1947	September 11, 1947
Enrique García Sayán	September 11, 1947	February 28, 1948
Armando Revoredo Iglesias	February 28, 1948	March 26, 1948
Mariano H. Melgar Conde	March 26, 1948	April 26, 1948
Armando Revoredo Iglesias	April 26, 1948	April 26, 1948
Mariano H. Melgar Conde	April 26, 1948	May 7, 1948
Armando Revoredo Iglesias	May 7, 1948	August 28, 1948
Mariano H. Melgar Conde	August 28, 1948	September 6, 1948
Armando Revoredo Iglesias	September 6, 1948	October 27, 1948
Federico Díaz Dulanto	October 31, 1948	June 2, 1949
Ernesto Rodríguez Ventocilla	June 2, 1949; June 1, 1950	June 1, 1950; July 28, 1950
Manuel Gallagher Canaval	July 28, 1950	December 14, 1950
Alberto Freundt Rosell	December 14, 1950	December 20, 1950
Manuel Gallagher Canaval	December 20, 1950	January 26, 1951
Alberto Freundt Rosell	January 26, 1951	February 20, 1951
Manuel Gallagher Canaval	February 20, 1951	March 23, 1951
Alberto Freundt Rosell	March 23, 1951	April 21, 1951
Manuel Gallagher Canaval	April 21, 1951	October 8, 1951
Alberto Freundt Rosell	October 8, 1951	November 4, 1951
Manuel Gallagher Canaval	November 4, 1951	June 9, 1952
Alberto Freundt Rosell	June 9, 1952	July 4, 1952
Manuel Gallagher Canaval	July 4, 1952	August 4, 1952
Ricardo Rivera Schreiber	August 4, 1952	August 4, 1952
Eduardo Miranda Sousa	August 4, 1952	August 21, 1952
Ricardo Rivera Schreiber	August 21, 1952	February 11, 1953
Eduardo Miranda Sousa	February 11, 1953	February 20, 1953
Ricardo Rivera Schreiber	February 20, 1953	August 22, 1953
Eduardo Miranda Sousa	August 22, 1953	September 2, 1953
Ricardo Rivera Schreiber	September 2, 1953	February 25, 1954
Eduardo Miranda Sousa	February 25, 1954	March 9, 1954
Ricardo Rivera Schreiber	March 9, 1954	June 10, 1954
Eduardo Miranda Sousa	June 10, 1954	June 29, 1954
Ricardo Rivera Schreiber	June 29, 1954	August 11, 1954
David Aguilar Cornejo	August 11, 1954	February 19, 1955
Alberto Freundt Rosell	February 19, 1955	March 2, 1955
David Aguilar Cornejo	March 2, 1955	June 18, 1955
Alberto Freundt Rosell	June 18, 1955	June 30, 1955
David Aguilar Cornejo	June 30, 1955	August 5, 1955
Alberto Freundt Rosell	August 5, 1955	August 16, 1955
David Aguilar Cornejo	August 16, 1955	December 2, 1955
Fernando Gamio Palacio	December 2, 1955	December 24, 1955
Luis Edgardo Llosa	December 24, 1955	April 7, 1956
Alfredo Sousa Almandoz	April 7, 1956	April 16, 1956
Luis Edgardo Llosa	April 16, 1956	June 29, 1956
Félix Huamán Izquierdo	June 29, 1956	July 28, 1956
Manuel Cisneros Sánchez	July 28, 1956	January 8, 1958
Víctor Andrés Belaúnde	January 8, 1958	April 4, 1958
Raúl Porras Barrenechea	April 4, 1958	October 15, 1960
Luis Alvarado Garrido	October 15, 1960	July 18, 1962
Luis Edgardo Llosa	July 18, 1962	July 28, 1963
Fernando Schwalb	July 28, 1963	September 15, 1965
Jorge Vásquez Salas	September 15, 1965	September 8, 1967
Edgardo Seoane	September 8, 1967	November 17, 1967
Raúl Ferrero Rebagliati	November 17, 1967	May 31, 1968
Oswaldo Hercelles García	May 31, 1968	October 2, 1968
Miguel Mujica Gallo	October 2, 1968	October 3, 1968
Luis Edgardo Mercado Jarrín	October 3, 1968	January 1, 1972
Miguel Ángel de la Flor	January 1, 1972	July 16, 1976
José de la Puente Radbill	July 16, 1976	February 1, 1979
Carlos García-Bedoya Zapata	February 1, 1979	November 30, 1979
Arturo García García	November 30, 1979	July 28, 1980
Javier Arias Stella	July 28, 1980	January 3, 1983
Fernando Schwalb	January 3, 1983	April 10, 1984
Sandro Mariátegui Chiappe	April 10, 1984	October 12, 1984
Luis Pércovich Roca	October 12, 1984	July 28, 1985
Allan Wagner Tizón	July 28, 1985	May 16, 1988
Luis Gonzales Posada	May 16, 1988	March 1, 1989
Guillermo Larco Cox	March 2, 1989	July 28, 1990
Luis Marchand	July 28, 1990	January 7, 1991
Raúl Sánchez Sotomayor	January 7, 1991	February 15, 1991
Carlos Torres y Torres Lara	February 15, 1991	November 6, 1991
Augusto Blacker Miller	November 6, 1991	April 24, 1992
Óscar de la Puente Raygada	April 24, 1992	June 28, 1993
Efraín Goldenberg	June 28, 1993	July 28, 1995
Francisco Tudela	July 28, 1995	July 17, 1998
Eduardo Ferrero Costa	July 17, 1998	October 12, 1998
Fernando de Trazegnies	October 12, 1998	November 25, 2000
Javier Pérez de Cuéllar	November 25, 2000	July 28, 2001
Diego García-Sayán	July 28, 2001	June 12, 2002
Allan Wagner Tizón	June 12, 2002	December 15, 2003
Manuel Rodríguez Cuadros	December 15, 2003	August 11, 2005
Fernando Olivera Vega	August 11, 2005	August 16, 2005
Óscar Maúrtua	August 16, 2005	July 28, 2006
José Antonio García Belaúnde	July 28, 2006	July 28, 2011
Rafael Roncagliolo	July 28, 2011	May 15, 2013
Eda Rivas	May 15, 2013	June 23, 2014
Gonzalo Gutiérrez Reinel	June 23, 2014	April 2, 2015
Ana María Sánchez Vargas de Ríos	April 2, 2015	July 28, 2016
Ricardo Luna Mendoza	July 28, 2016	January 9, 2018
Cayetana Aljovín	January 9, 2018	April 2, 2018
Néstor Popolizio	April 2, 2018	September 30, 2019
Gustavo Meza-Cuadra Velásquez	October 3, 2019	July 15, 2020
Mario López Chávarri	July 15, 2020	November 10, 2020
Franca Deza	November 10, 2020	November 17, 2020
Elizabeth Astete	November 18, 2020	February 14, 2021
Allan Wagner Tizón	February 15, 2021	July 28, 2021
Héctor Béjar	July 29, 2021	August 17, 2021
Óscar Maúrtua	August 20, 2021	February 1, 2022
César Landa	February 1, 2022	August 5, 2022
Miguel Rodríguez Mackay	August 5, 2022	September 9, 2022
César Landa	September 13, 2022	December 7, 2022
Ana Gervasi	December 10, 2022	November 6, 2023
Javier González Olaechea	November 7, 2023	September 3, 2024
Elmer Schialer	September 3, 2024	October 14, 2025
Hugo de Zela	October 14, 2025	April 22, 2026
Carlos Pareja Ríos	April 22, 2026	July 28, 2026
Carlos Espá	July 28, 2026	Incumbent

== See also ==
- Palacio de Torre Tagle, headquarters
- Lima Stock Exchange Building, also owned by the ministry
- Ambassadors of Peru
- List of diplomatic missions of Peru
