= Ricardo Rivera Schreiber =

Peruvian diplomat

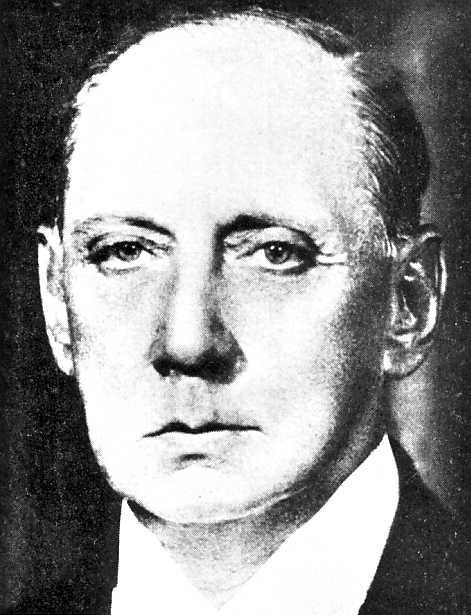

Ministry of Foreign Affairs
- In office 1952–1954
- President: Manuel A. Odría
- Preceded by: Manuel Gallagher
- Succeeded by: David Aguilar Cornejo

Ambassador of Peru to the United Kingdom
- In office 1954–1963
- Preceded by: Alberto Freundt
- Succeeded by: Gonzalo N. de Arámburu
- In office 1949–1952
- Preceded by: Fernando Berckemeyer Pazos
- Succeeded by: Alberto Freundt

Ambassador of Peru to Italy
- In office 1944–1946
- Preceded by: Pedro Yrigoyen Diez-Canseco
- Succeeded by: Luis Alberto Flores

Ambassador of Peru to Spain
- In office 1943–1944
- Preceded by: Pedro Yrigoyen Diez-Canseco
- Succeeded by: Gonzalo Pizarro

Minister Plenipotentiary to China and Japan
- In office 1936–1941
- Preceded by: Manuel Elías Bonnemaison
- Succeeded by: Aníbal Ponce

Personal details
- Born: Ricardo Ernesto Víctor Rivera Schreiber; 11 November 1892 Lima
- Died: 25 July 1969 (aged 76) Houston
- Spouse: Teresa Kroll
- Education: University of San Marcos
- Occupation: Diplomat
- Awards: Knight Grand Cross of The Order of the British Empire

Ricardo Ernesto Víctor Rivera Schreiber, GBE (11 November 1892 – 25 July 1969) was a Peruvian diplomat who served as Minister of Foreign Affairs between 1952 and 1954.

== Early life ==
Rivera Schreiber was born in 1892 in Lima, the eldest son of Ricardo Rivera Navarrete and Madilte Schreiber Waddington. His father, a grandson of a precursor of the Peruvian independence, was a hero of the War of the Pacific and a member of the Senate. His mother was the daughter of the Austro-Hungarian consul in Huaraz (Peru) and the granddaughter of a prominent British merchant who was established in the same town.

He was educated at the Recoleta Sacred Heart School and University of San Marcos, where he obtained the bachelor and doctor degrees in jurisprudence in 1915. Briefly, he worked as rapporteur of the High Council of Mines. He married Mercedes Urquidi de Tezanos Pinto in 1919 and remarried Teresa Kroll Müller in 1940.

In 1917 Schreiber entered the diplomatic service. He was nominated Secretary of the Peruvian legation in La Paz and appointed Secretary of the Peruvian Delegation to the League of Nations in 1919. He was then appointed successively as Second Secretary (1920) and Chargé d'affaires (1921–26) in London, where he represented his country in the Centennial Celebrations of the Peruvian Independence in 1921. Subsequently, he was Charge d'Affaires at The Hague in 1926 and promoted to Minister to Ecuador in 1928. However, in 1930 he requested his retirement from active diplomatic service due to dissent with the Government on the foreign policy with Ecuador.

Schreiber returned to Lima, where he performed as legal counsel of the Cerro de Pasco Copper Corporation and as professor of international law at the Pontifical Catholic University of Peru. In 1934 he was appointed Special Delegate to the Peruvian-Colombian Commission in Washington, D.C., on the crisis of the Leticia Incident.

In 1936 he returned to the active service as Minister Plenipotentiary to China and Japan. Briefly, he was moved to Colombia, where he signed a Treaty of Friendship and Cooperation in 1938. By April 1941, while he was posted in Tokyo, Schreiber was informed that the Japanese would enter the war with an attack on Pearl Harbor and warned the United States Embassy. The U.S. State Department disqualified the report and when the naval base was attacked nine months later, he was confined under house arrest in the Japanese mountains at Miyanoshita. The Peruvian and American missions were evacuated from Japan in June 1942 on the Asama Maru and were later exchanged for Japanese diplomats in Lourenço Marques.

In 1943 he was appointed Ambassador to Spain. Retaining this posting, Schreiber was President of the Peruvian Delegation to the Preparatory Commission for the United Nations and was nominated Vice-President of its Legal Committee in 1945. The following year, he was appointed Ambassador to Italy and Delegate to the First United Nations Assembly celebrated in London. From 1949 to 1952 he was Ambassador to the United Kingdom.

In 1952 President Odría appointed him Minister of Foreign Affairs. During his office, the Diplomatic Academy was created and was enacted the Diplomatic Service Regulation in 1953. When Prime Minister Zenón Noriega was sent to exile accused of organized a coup against Odría in August 1954, he resigned. That same year, Schreiber returned to London as ambassador, a posting he remained in until his retirement in 1963.

He died in July 1969 in Houston.

=== Honours ===
Rivera Schreiber was invested as a Knight Commander of the Order of the British Empire (Hon.) in 1926 and a Knight Grand Cross of the Order (Hon.) in 1962. He was also a Grand Officer of the Legion of Honour, a Knight Grand Cross of the Order of Isabella the Catholic and a Grand Cordon of the Order of the Sacred Treasure.

On 8 June 1947 he was made a Knight Grand Cross of Magistral Grace of the Sovereign Military Order of Malta. For his services to the Holy See, the Pope invested him as a Knight Grand Cross of the Order of St. Sylvester and Grand Officer of the Order of St. Gregory the Great (GCSG) and awarded him the Papal Lateran Cross.

He was a member of The Hague Academy of International Law, the International Law Association of London, l'Académie Diplomatique Internationale and the Royal Academy of Jurisprudence of Madrid. Rivera Schreiber was also a member of the Administrative Council of the Permanent Court of Arbitration (1926–29), President of the Anglo-Peruvian Society and President of the Peruvian Association of the Sovereign Order of Malta.
