= Lima Stock Exchange Building =

Building in Peru

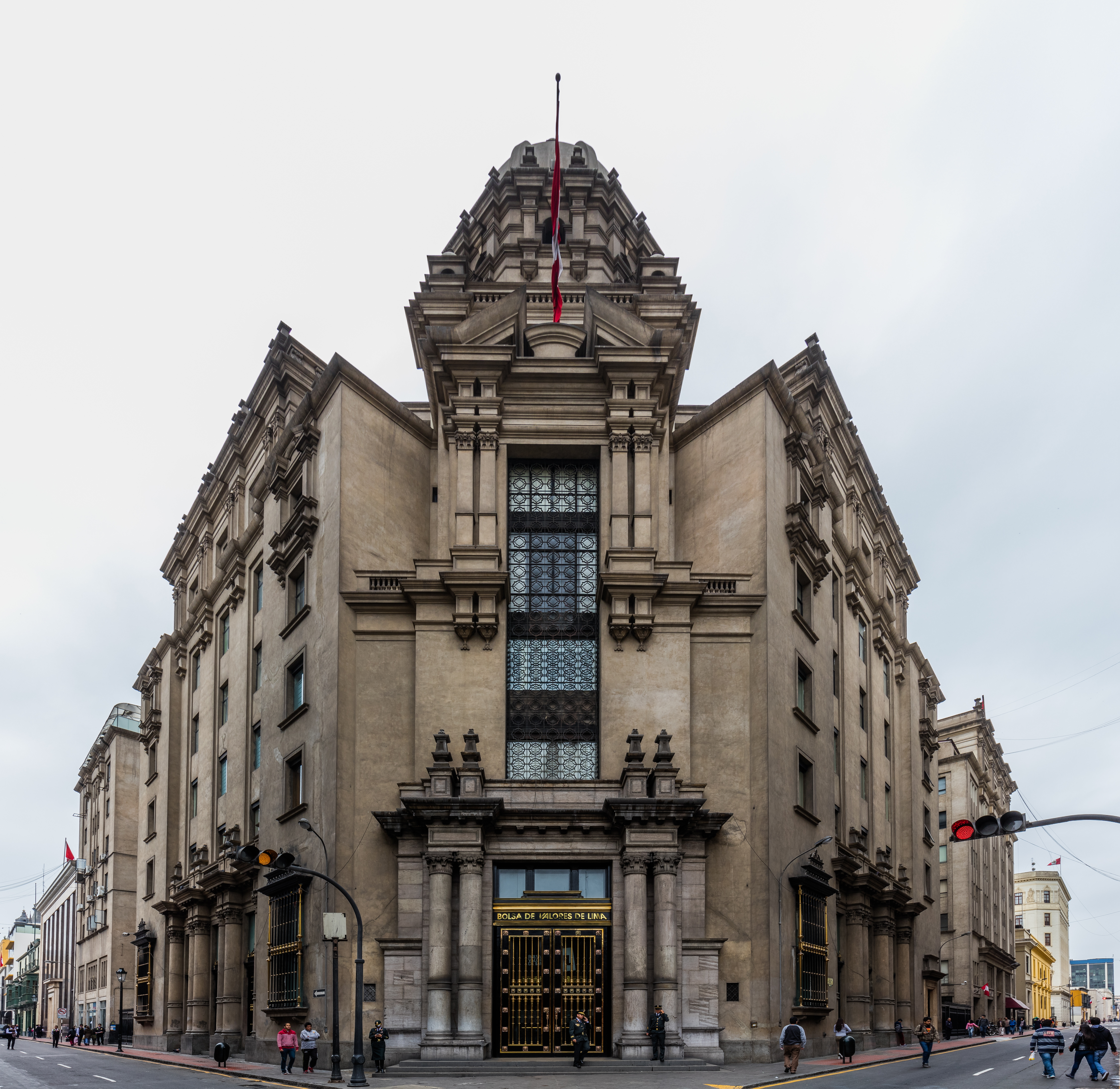
- The building in 2015
- Interactive map of the Lima Stock Exchange Building area

General information
- Location: Jr. Carabaya & Sta. Rosa
- Coordinates: 12.0486°S 77.0315°W
- Completed: 1950
- Owner: Ministry of Foreign Affairs

Technical details
- Floor count: 9 (2 basements)
- Floor area: 4,505 m^{2}

Design and construction
- Architect: José Álvarez Calderón

The Lima Stock Exchange Building is a building located at the intersection of Carabaya and Santa Rosa streets, in the historic centre of Lima, Peru. Its name comes from the fact that, from 1997 to 2022, it housed the Lima Stock Exchange, after which the building was acquired by the Ministry of Foreign Affairs.

The Directorate General for Peruvian Communities Abroad and Consular Affairs (Spanish: Dirección General de Comunidades Peruanas en el Exterior y Asuntos Consulares) of the Ministry of Foreign Affairs is headquartered in the building since August 3, 2023.

== History ==
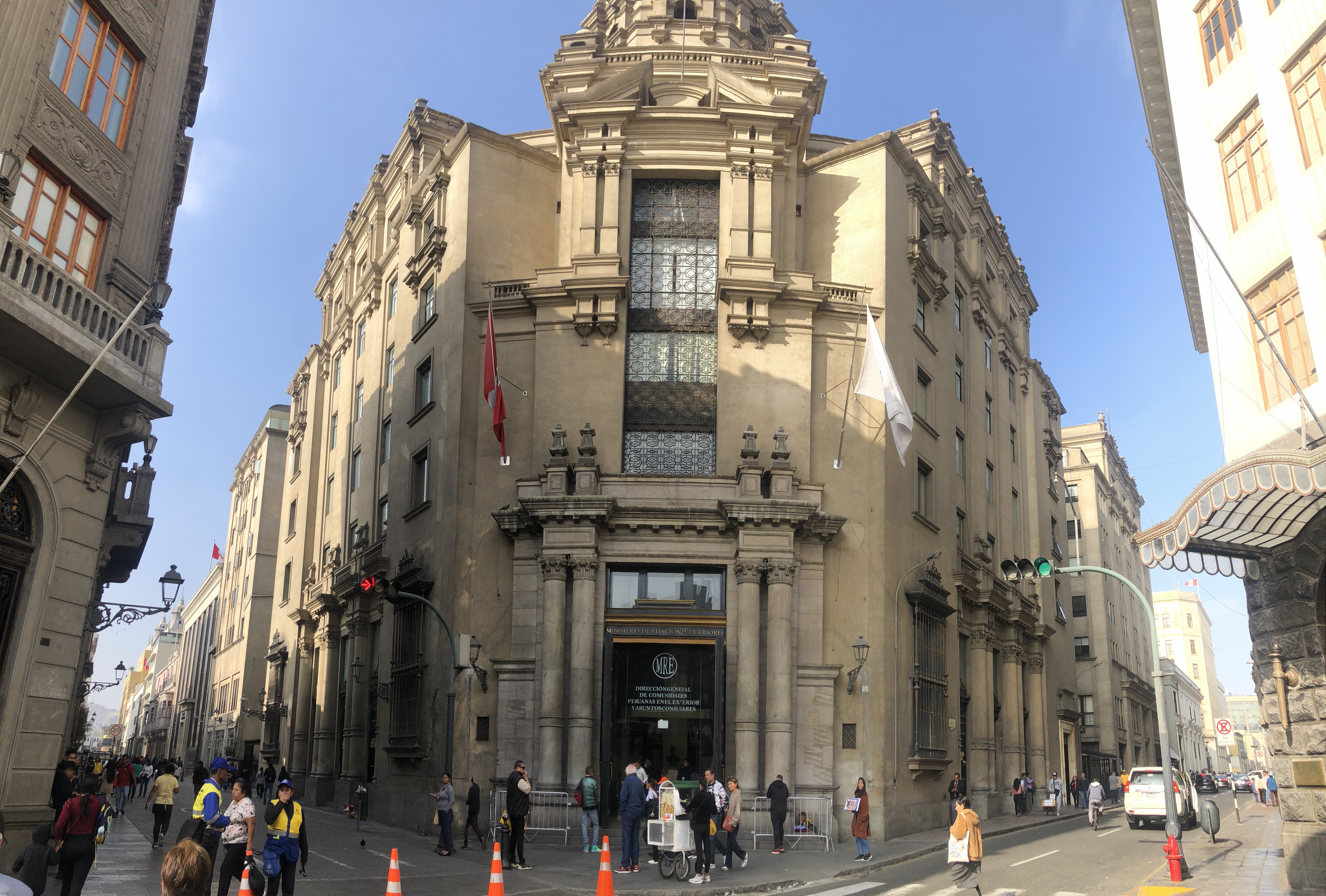
The building in June 2024

The building was inaugurated in 1950, being occupied by the Lima Stock Exchange (BVL) starting in 1997. In 2018, as part the U.S. delegation visiting Lima to attend the 8th Summit of the Americas, Ivanka Trump, daughter of then U.S. President Donald Trump, made an official visit to the building in order to take part in a meeting between delegations of both countries.

The building was put on sale by real estate company Binswanger Perú in 2019, at a price of US$ 6,98 million. Although the BVL owned the majority of the building, its last three floors had been sold to company Arte Express by insurance company Rímac Seguros y Reaseguros S.A. earlier in the year.

On August 3, 2023, the Peruvian Ministry of Foreign Affairs inaugurated the new seat of the Directorate General for Peruvian Communities Abroad and Consular Affairs. The ceremony, headed by foreign minister Ana Gervasi, coincided with the 202nd anniversary of the foundation of the ministry.

== See also ==
- Lima Stock Exchange
- Ministry of Foreign Affairs (Peru)
