= Mariano Felipe Paz Soldán =

Peruvian historian and geographer

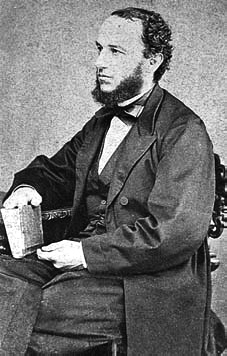

Minister of Justice and Instruction
- In office 28 October 1869 – 27 May 1870
- President: José Balta
- Preceded by: Teodoro La Rosa
- Succeeded by: José de Araníbar y Llano

Minister of Foreign Relations
- In office 26 January 1867 – 14 February 1867
- President: Mariano Ignacio Prado
- Preceded by: Manuel Yrigoyen Arias
- Succeeded by: Manuel Yrigoyen Arias

Personal details
- Born: 22 August 1821 Arequipa
- Died: 22 August 1886 (aged 64) Lima
- Education: University of San Agustín

Mariano Felipe Paz Soldán y Ureta (August 22, 1821 - December 31, 1886), Peruvian historian and geographer, was born in Arequipa, Peru. He was Minister of Justice and Instruction and Minister of Foreign Relations.

== Education and early career ==
Paz Soldán was the son of Manuel Paz Soldán and Gregoria de Ureta Araníbar and was educated at Seminary of San Jerónimo and University of San Agustín, where he obtained a degree in Law. He had three brothers Mateo, José Gregorio and Pedro.

He studied law and, after holding some minor judicial offices, was minister to New Granada in 1853. After his return, he occupied himself with plans for the establishment of a model penitentiary at Lima, which he was enabled to accomplish through the support of General Ramon Castilla. In 1860, Castilla made him director of public works, in which capacity he superintended the erection of the Lima statue of Simón Bolívar. He was also concerned in the reform of the currency by the withdrawal of the debased Bolivian coins.

== Atlas, History, and Geographical Dictionary ==
=== Great atlas ===
In 1861, he published his great atlas of the republic of Peru, and, in 1868, the first volume of his history of Peru after the acquisition of her independence. A second volume followed, and a third, bringing the history down to 1839, was published after his death by his son.

=== Geographical Dictionary of Peru ===
In 1870, he was minister of justice and worship under President José Balta, but shortly afterwards retired from public life. He edited his brother Mateo's great geographical dictionary of Peru, which was published in 1877. During the disastrous war with Chile, he sought refuge in Buenos Aires where he was made professor in the Colegio Nacional de Buenos Aires and where he wrote and published a history of the war (1884). He died on December 31, 1886.

== Publications ==
- Índice alfabético del Código Civil y de Enjuiciamientos y de Reglamento de Tribunales (1853)
- Geografía del Perú (1860)
- Atlas Geográfico del Perú (1865)
- Diccionario geográfico del Perú (1877)
- Historia del Perú independiente 1819-1827 (1868)
- Biblioteca Peruana (1879)
- Narración histórica de la guerra de Chile contra Perú y Bolivia (1883)

== See also ==
- Beagle Channel cartography since 1881
- Media related to Mariano Paz Soldán at Wikimedia Commons
