= Javier González Olaechea =

Peruvian political scientist

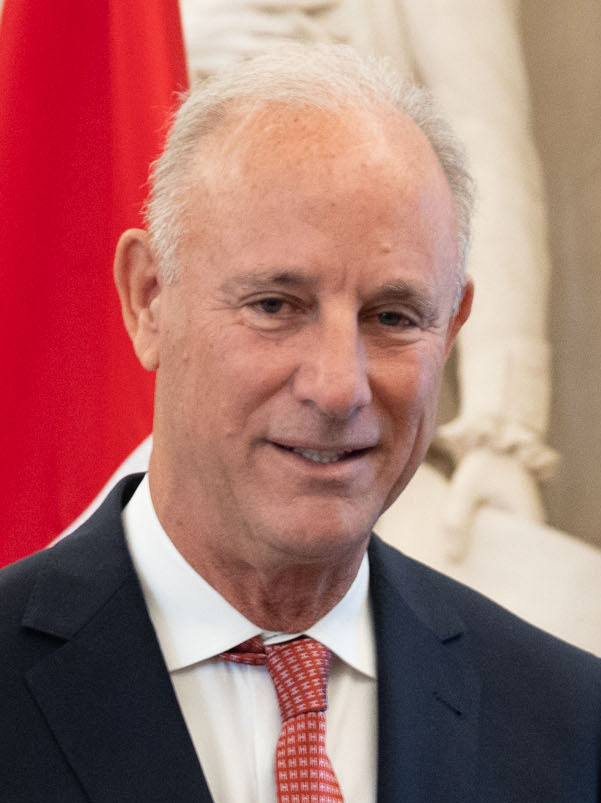

Minister of Foreign Relations
- In office 7 November 2023 – 3 September 2024
- President: Dina Boluarte
- Prime Minister: Alberto Otárola; Gustavo Adrianzén
- Preceded by: Ana Cecilia Gervasi
- Succeeded by: Elmer Schialer

Personal details
- Born: 13 December 1957 (age 68) Lima, Peru
- Party: Independent (2025–present; before 2024)
- Other political affiliations: Christian People's Party (2024–2025)
- Spouse: Patricia Dutari de la Espriella
- Children: 5
- Parent(s): Manuel González Olaechea Casanova; Dolores Franco Salcedo
- Education: Pontifical Catholic University of Argentina (BA); École nationale d'administration (MA); University of Belgrano (PhD)
- Occupation: Political scientist; Politician

Javier Juan Vicente Ramón González Olaechea Franco (born 13 December 1958) is a Peruvian political scientist and politician who served as minister of Foreign Relations in the presidency of Dina Boluarte from 2023 to 2024.

Formed in Argentina and France and of a diplomatic background stemming from his family, González Olaechea gained national profile as he confronted the body of the Organization of American States in his capacity of Peru's foreign minister in the aftermath of the contentious 2024 Venezuelan presidential election, a process that was marked by political repression from the Maduro administration against the opposition, in addition to the allegations of fraud as the results are yet to be verified.

Briefly a member of the centre-right Christian People's Party, González Olaechea announced his bid for President of Peru at the 2026 general election following his tenure as government minister. He subsequently withdrew from the presidential primary and resigned from the party.

== Career ==
González Olaechea has served as an advisor to four entities of the Peruvian government: the Office of the Prime Minister, and the ministries of Labour and Promotion of Employment, Interior, and Energy and Mines. Internationally, he served as regional director of the International Labour Organization for Mercosur while residing in Argentina, in addition to holding a variety of positions in the Turin and Geneva for the United Nations.

Throughout his career, González Olaechea has taken a variety of academic positions, serving as a professor at the National University of San Marcos and the University of Lima, in addition to teaching at the Diplomatic Academy of Peru and the Center for Higher National Studies.

At the 1995 Peruvian general election, González Olaechea ran unsuccessfully for the Peruvian Congress under Union for Peru, the political party founded by Javier Pérez de Cuéllar to compete against Alberto Fujimori’s first reelection campaign.

González Olaechea has also served as an opinion columnist for El Comercio and International Press.

=== Minister of foreign relations (2023-2024) ===
On 7 November 2023, González Olaechea was appointed and sworn in by President Dina Boluarte, as minister of Foreign Relations of Peru, succeeding Ana Cecilia Gervasi in the position following her departure after failing to secure a bilateral meeting between Boluarte and U.S. president Joe Biden.

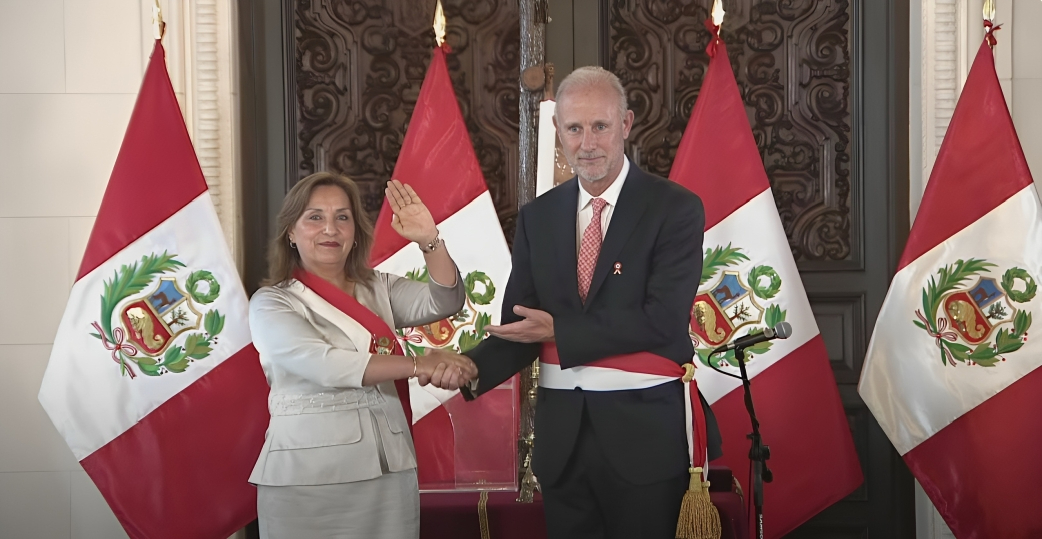
Javier González Olaechea after being sworn in as Minister of Foreign Relations by President Dina Boluarte in November 2023.

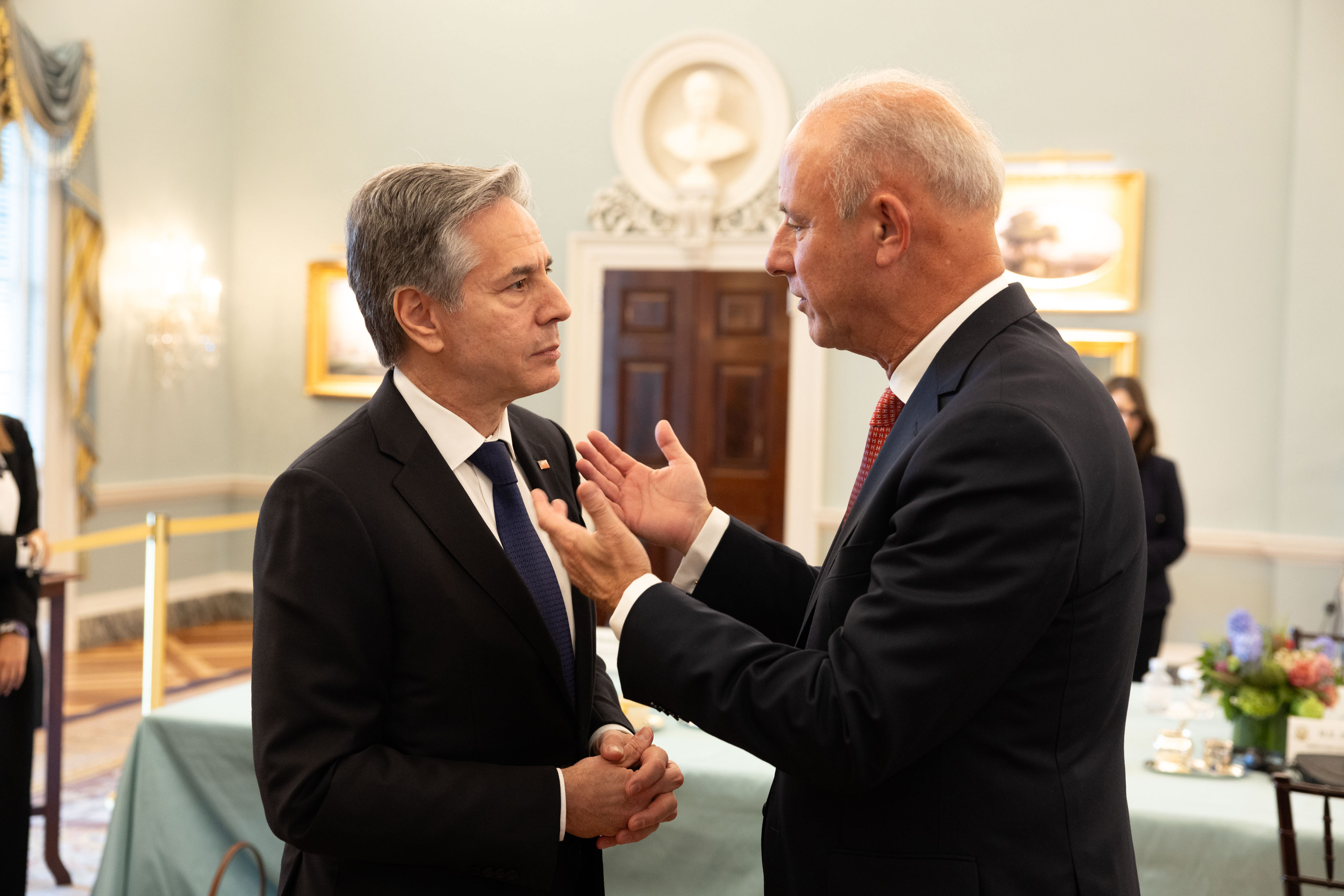
Javier González Olaechea and U.S. secretary of state Antony Blinken at the White House in March 2024.

Into his tenure as foreign minister, González Olaechea gained notoriety as he publicly rebuked the Canadian ambassador to Peru, Louis Marcotte, who had criticized a Peruvian bill that allegedly harmed the economic financing of non-governmental development organizations, for which González Olaechea reacted in condemnation of a letter signed by sixteen diplomatic missions concerning the issue as foreign intromission of national affairs. Members of the Peruvian Congress from multiple parties supported González Olaechea's stance against the alleged external interference from foreign representatives.

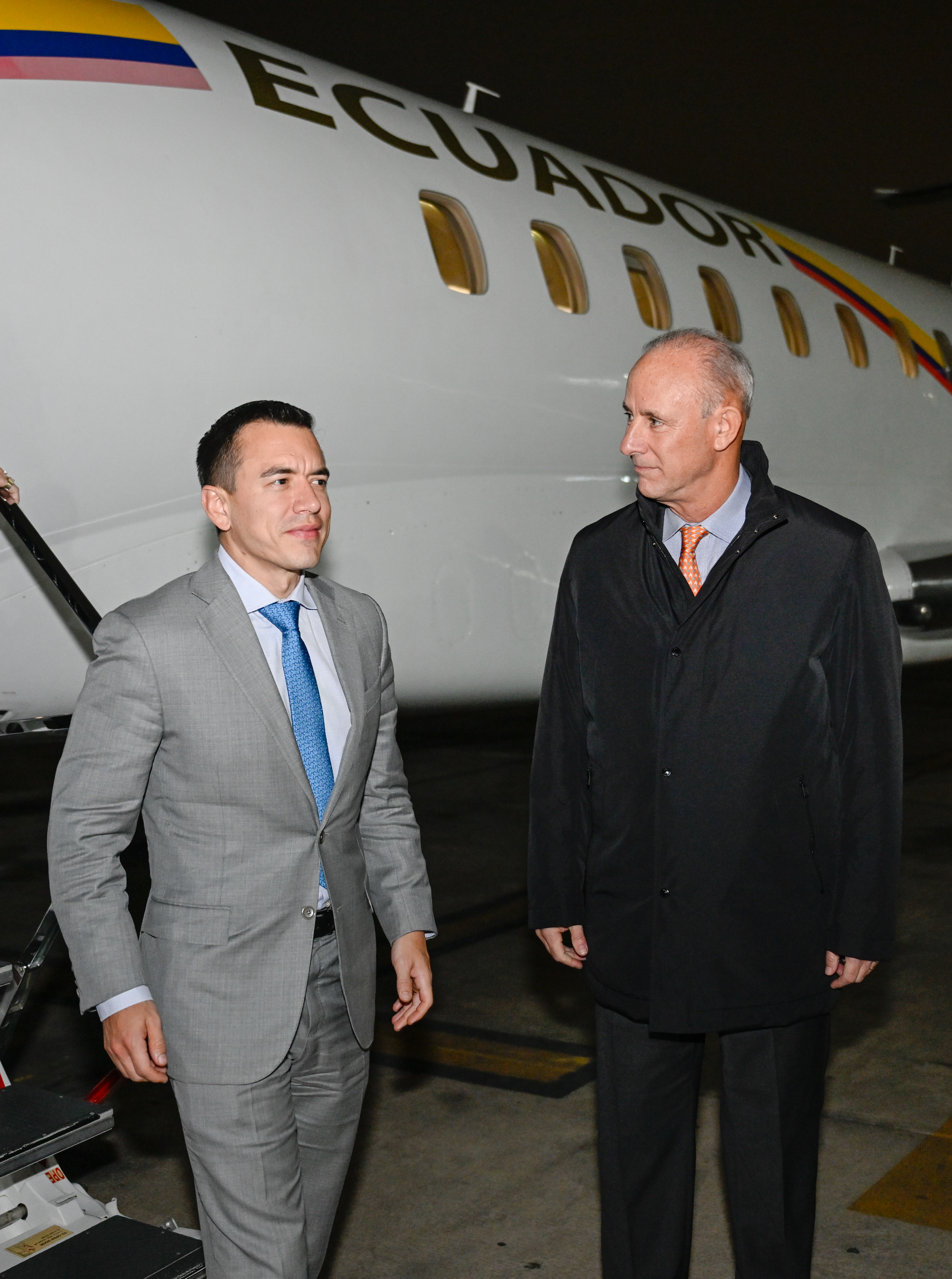
Javier González Olaechea and President of Ecuador Daniel Noboa in Lima in June 2024.

On 31 July 2024, at the Organization of American States Special Assembly held in Washington D.C., González-Olaechea intervened pointing out an “identity crisis” that the organization may suffer if the diplomatic body did not assume a clear and defined position concerning the 2024 Venezuelan presidential election, stressing that the Venezuelan elections had serious irregularities and were "fraudulent from the start", reminding the body that opposition leader María Corina Machado had been eliminated from the race prior to the election, that the electoral board had not even revealed the official vote tally, and that his defense was "not ideological but of principle". The speech was widely acclaimed by the Venezuelan opposition and regional leaders that condemned the results and refused to accept Venezuelan President Nicolás Maduro unverified victory; on the other hand, criticism arouse surrounding the decorum of his intervention from a diplomatic perspective.

González Olaechea served in the position until 3 September 2024, as President Boluarte reshuffled her cabinet. He was replaced by career diplomat Elmer Schialer.

== 2026 presidential run ==
Following Boluarte's cabinet reshuffle, it was revealed that González Olaechea registered in the Christian People's Party - PPC during his time as foreign minister before 12 July 2024, which was the deadline to register in a political party in order to run at the 2026 general election, hinting at a potential run.

Subsequently, González Olaechea announced his bid for the Peruvian presidency in November 2024, confirming the speculation surrounding his recent partisan registration.

Confirmed as a presidential candidate in the Christian People's Party presidential primary, González Olaechea withdrew from the primary election and resigned from the party on 14 March 2025, citing personal reasons after a “profund reflexion” in a letter addressed to party leader Carlos Neuhaus. He remains ineligible to participate in the general election unless he is invited to run as congressional candidate as an independent.

== Electoral history ==
Election	Office	List	#	District	Votes			Result	Ref.
Election	Office	List	#	District	Total	%	P.	Result	Ref.
1995	Member of Congress	Union for Peru	21	Lima Metropolitan Area	5,591	13.99%	2nd (Note: Presented on an electoral list. The data shown represents the share of the vote the entire party/alliance received in that constituency.)	Not elected	
