= Alfredo Solf y Muro =

Peruvian politician

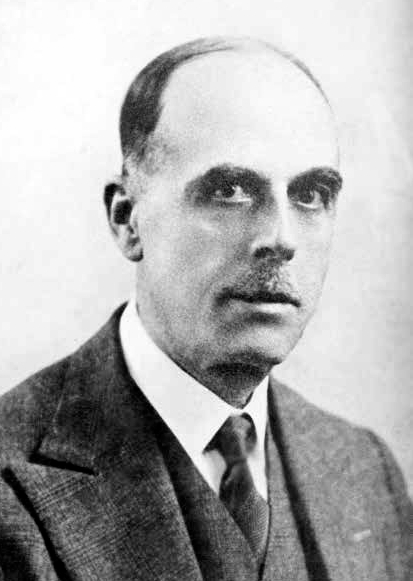
Alfredo Solf y Muro

Alfredo Solf y Muro (15 March 1872, in Lambayeque – 14 August 1969, in Lima) was a Peruvian politician. He was Minister of Finance in 1933. He was the Prime Minister of Peru from 8 December 1939 until 3 December 1944. Solf y Muro also served as foreign minister.

He died on 14 August 1969, aged 97.

Political offices
Preceded by Alberto Rey de Castro y Romaña	Prime Minister of Peru; 1939–1944	Succeeded by Manuel Cisneros Sánchez
Records
Preceded by Camille Huysmans	Oldest living state leader 24 May 1968 – 14 August 1969	Succeeded by Joseph Paul-Boncour
