= Rafael Roncagliolo =

Peruvian politician (1944–2021)

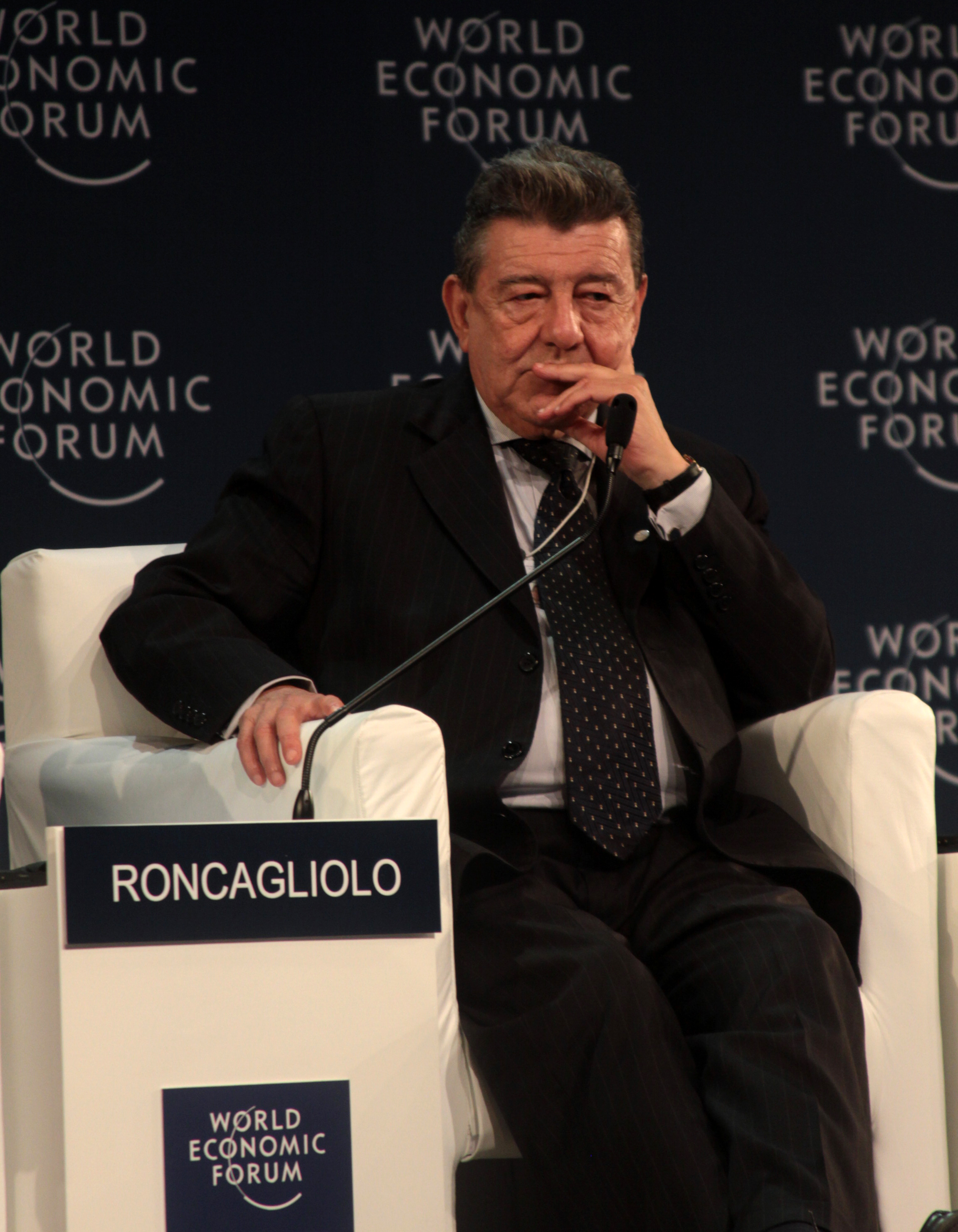

Minister of Foreign Relations
- In office 28 July 2011 – 14 May 2013
- President: Ollanta Humala
- Preceded by: José Antonio García Belaúnde
- Succeeded by: Eda Rivas

Personal details
- Born: Fortunato Rafael Roncagliolo de Orbegoso; 14 November 1944 Lima, Peru
- Died: 1 May 2021 (aged 76) Lima, Peru
- Party: Independent

Fortunato Rafael Roncagliolo de Orbegoso (14 November 1944 – 1 May 2021) was a Peruvian sociologist, diplomat, and politician. He served as Minister of Foreign Affairs under President Ollanta Humala from 28 July 2011 until he resigned on 14 May 2013, after the diplomatic crisis with Venezuela and the government of Nicolás Maduro.He later served as Ambassador to Spain from 2015 to 2016. He died on 1 May 2021, from COVID-19.

== Biography ==
He was born in Lima on November 14, 1944. He is the son of Nicolás Roncagliolo Aste and Susana de Orbegoso Pimentel (great-granddaughter of Marshal Luis José de Orbegoso, president of Peru). His father, a small landowner from the south, was mayor of Nazca (1945-1947; 1964–1966).

In 1972, he married Catalina Lohmann Luca de Tena, daughter of the historian and diplomat Guillermo Lohmann and granddaughter of Juan Ignacio Luca de Tena, Marquis of Luca de Tena. His children are Inés, Tania and the writer Santiago Roncagliolo.

He studied at the Colegio de la Inmaculada and at the Pontifical Catholic University of Peru, where he graduated with a bachelor's degree in Social Sciences (1969) and a degree in sociology (1970). During his stay at said university, he was an instructor of Spanish (1962) and auxiliary professor of sociology (1966) at the Faculty of Letters, and, in addition, president of the Federation of Students (Fepucp) in 1965.

== Political career ==
=== Public administration ===
Roncagliolo was a keen supporter of the leftist military dictatorship of general Juan Velasco Alvarado and defended its confiscation of the Peruvian newspapers in 1974. Years later, he participated in different entities of the Peruvian public administration: Advisory Councils of the Presidency of the Council of Ministers, the Ministry of Education, the Ministry of Housing, the National Council of Science and Technology, the National Institute of Culture and the National Institute of Planning .

=== Minister of Foreign Affairs ===
On July 20, 2011, it was announced that he will be the Foreign Affairs Minister of the new government of Ollanta Humala as of July 28, replacing José Antonio García Belaúnde.

In the exercise of this position, Roncagliolo proposed to implement an active diplomacy projecting outwards the sum of the different internal sectoral policies and in coherence with a policy of social inclusion, taking into account that Peru is interconnected and inserted in the globalized world where economic and political crises affect all countries.

== Personal life ==
He was the father of the author Santiago Roncagliolo.
