= Francisco Tudela y Varela =

French-born Peruvian diplomat, lawyer and politician

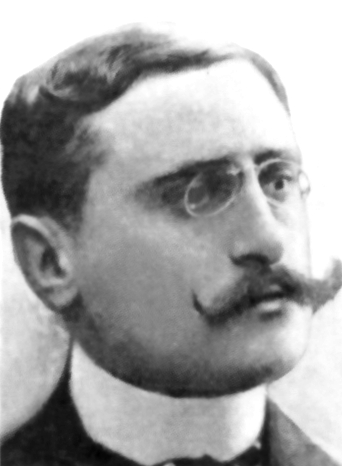

Francisco Tudela y Varela (December 24, 1876 – November 19, 1962) was a French-born Peruvian diplomat, lawyer and politician. He was born in Paris, France. He graduated from the National University of San Marcos and served on its faculty. He was a member of the Civilista Party. He was Minister of Finance (August 22 – September 18, 1914) and foreign minister (June 17 – December 24, 1913, July 27, 1917 – December 6, 1918) in the Government of Peru. He was 68th Prime Minister of Peru (July 27, 1917 – December 18, 1918) under President José Pardo y Barreda. He served as ambassador of Peru to Spain and the United States (1918–1919), and later to the Netherlands (1936). He served as President of the Chamber of Deputies (1915–1916). He served as mayor of Lima.

He became president of the Central Reserve Bank in 1945 and served until 1948.

Political offices
Preceded by Wenceslao Valera	Foreign Minister of Peru; 1913	Succeeded by Emilio Althaus Dartnell
Preceded by Luis F. Villarán	Minister of Finance of Peru; 1914	Succeeded by Aurelio Sousa Matute
Preceded by Enrique de la Riva Agüero	Foreign Minister of Peru; 1917–1918	Succeeded by Ricardo L. Flores Gaviño
Preceded by Enrique de la Riva-Agüero y Looz Corswaren	Prime Minister of Peru; 1917–1918	Succeeded by Germán Arenas y Loayza

== Works ==
- «La nacionalidad en el Perú» (inserta en Anales de la Universidad , tomo XXVII, pp. 193–212; Lima, 1900). Tesis con la que se graduó de bachiller en Ciencias Políticas y Administrativas en 1899.
- «El Derecho Internacional americano» (inserta en Anales de la Universidad , tomo XXVIII, pp. 83–118; Lima, 1901). Tesis con la que se graduó de doctor en Ciencias Políticas y Administrativas en 1900.
- «El voto obligatorio». Tesis con la que se graduó de bachiller en Jurisprudencia en 1899.

== Bibliography ==
- Basadre, Jorge: Historia de la República del Perú. 1822 - 1933, Octava Edición, corregida y aumentada. Tomos 10 y 11. Editada por el Diario "La República" de Lima y la Universidad "Ricardo Palma". Impreso en Santiago de Chile, 1998.
- Tauro del Pino, Alberto: Enciclopedia Ilustrada del Perú. Tercera Edición. Tomo 16, TAB/UYU. Lima, PEISA, 2001. ISBN 9972-40-165-0
- Guerra, Margarita: Historia General del Perú. Tomo XI. La República Aristocrática. Primera Edición. Editor Carlos Milla Batres. Lima, Perú, 1984. Depósito legal: B. 22436-84 (XI).
