= Elmer Schialer =

Peruvian diplomat and professor

His Excellency Elmer Schialer
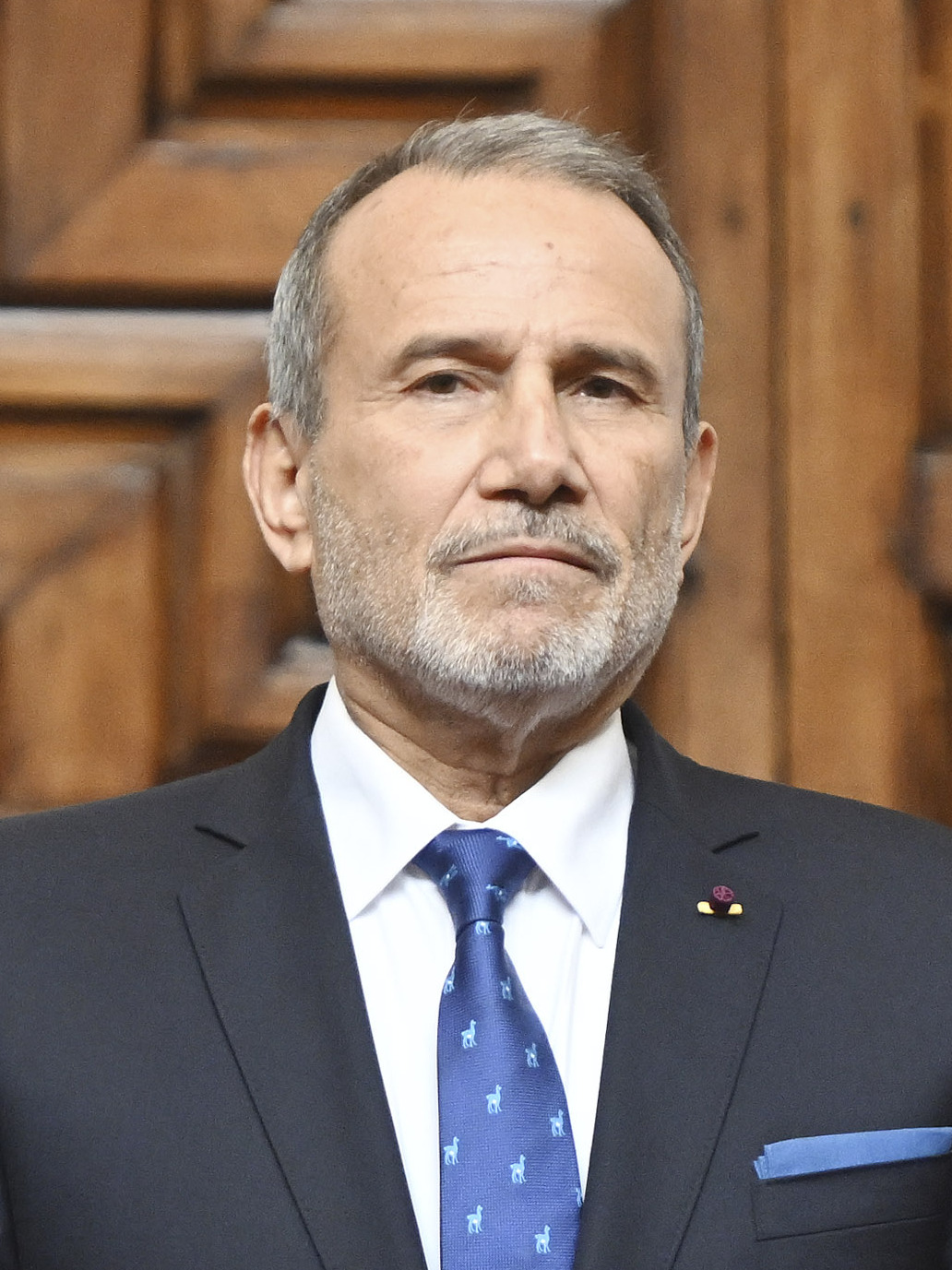
- Official portrait, 2024

Minister of Foreign Relations
- In office 3 September 2024 – 10 October 2025
- President: Dina Boluarte
- Prime Minister: Gustavo Adrianzén; Eduardo Arana
- Preceded by: Javier González Olaechea
- Succeeded by: Hugo de Zela

Personal details
- Born: 10 January 1960 (age 66) Guatemala City, Guatemala
- Education: Pontifical Catholic University of Argentina
- Occupation: Diplomat; professor

Elmer José Germán Gonzalo Schialer Salcedo (born 10 January 1960) is a Peruvian diplomat and professor who served as Minister of Foreign Relations from 2024 to 2025.

== Early life and education ==
Schialer was born on 10 January 1960 in Guatemala City. He holds a degree in international relations from the Diplomatic Academy of Peru, and Master's degree in economics from the Pontifical Catholic University of Argentina. He also completed postgraduate studies in systems engineering.

== Career ==
Schialer served as the ambassador of Peru to Germany from 2017 to 2023. He was appointed minister of foreign relations on 3 September 2024.

== Personal life ==
Schialer speaks fluent German, French and English, and also has a basic knowledge of Italian and Portuguese.
