= Víctor Andrés Belaúnde =

Peruvian diplomat, politician, philosopher and scholar

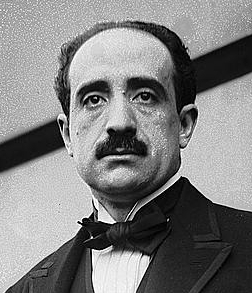
- Belaúnde in 1920

President of the 14th UN General Assembly
- In office 1959–1960
- Preceded by: Charles Malik
- Succeeded by: Frederick Henry Boland

Minister of Foreign Affairs
- In office 8 January 1958 – 4 April 1958
- President: Manuel Prado Ugarteche
- Prime Minister: Manuel Cisneros Sánchez
- Preceded by: Manuel Cisneros Sánchez
- Succeeded by: Raul Porras Barrenechea

Personal details
- Born: Víctor Andrés Belaúnde Diez-Canseco; 15 December 1883 Arequipa
- Died: 14 December 1966 (aged 82) New York City
- Party: National Democratic Party
- Spouse: Teresa Moreyra y Paz-Soldán
- Education: University of San Marcos
- Occupation: Diplomat
- Profession: Lawyer
- Awards: Order of the Sun

Víctor Andrés Belaúnde Diez–Canseco (15 December 1883 – 14 December 1966) was a Peruvian diplomat, politician, philosopher and scholar. He chaired the 14th Session and the 4th Emergency Special Session of the United Nations General Assembly between 1959 and 1960 and was Minister of Foreign Affairs of Peru in 1958. A distinguished scholar, Belaúnde was an important Catholic thinker and a professor at the San Marcos University and then at the Pontifical Catholic University of Peru, where he was emeritus rector.

== Biography ==
=== Early years and education ===
Belaúnde was born in Arequipa, Peru, in 1883. His father was Mariano Andrés Belaúnde de la Torre, a southern landowner and politician who was Minister of Finance and who is best known for having been injustly implicated in a corruption affair during the López de Romaña administration. His mother was Mercedes Diez-Canseco y Vargas, a daughter of General Pedro Diez-Canseco, several times President of Peru.

After receiving his early education there at the Escuela San Vicente and San José (Colegio San José), he decided to study law first at the Universidad Nacional de San Agustín de Arequipa and later at the National University of San Marcos, where he obtained a LL.B. and a doctorate degree in 1904 and 1908, respectively, with a main thesis on The Philosophy of Law and the Positivist Method. In addition to receiving his law degrees, he also obtained two doctorate degrees in political sciences and administration and in literature in 1911.

=== Diplomatic service ===
He entered the diplomatic service in 1903. That same year, he was appointed Secretary of the Archive of Limits, the cartographic department of the Ministry of Foreign Affairs, and Secretary to the Spanish-Argentinean Diplomatic Mission on the Peru-Bolivian Question in Madrid and Buenos Aires in 1905. Between 1907 and 1911 Belaúnde was once again in the cartographic department of the Ministry as Chief of the Section of Limits. He was subsequently appointed chargé d'affaires at the Peruvian legations in Berlin in 1911 and La Paz in 1915. During this time, he spent short terms studying history, constitutional law and English literature at Oxford and Cambridge.

Upon his return to Peru, he married Sofía Yrigoyen and was one of the founders of the National Democratic Party led by José de la Riva Agüero. During the 1915 general elections, he stood for election in Arequipa but resigned to his candidacy and returned to San Marcos as professor of modern philosophy. Once again in 1917, Belaúnde stood for election but this time he was defeated. Next year, he founded the renowned Mercurio Peruano, a literary magazine named as the Peruvian newspaper founded in 1790.

In 1919, President Pardo appointed him Minister Plenipotentiary to Uruguay but shortly afterwards he resigned because of the coup d'état led by Augusto B. Leguía. Next year, he gave some conferences in American universities including Columbia, where he was a lecturer of cultural affairs. After his time abroad, Belaúnde returned to Peru and was reincorporated to the University of San Marcos as professor of constitutional law. However, after a political speech delivered in San Marcos against the Leguía's regime, he was incarcerated in the San Lorenzo Island by the Leguía regime and deported in 1921.

=== Exile ===
During his nine years as a political exile, Belaúnde dedicated himself to academic life. He was a lecturer of Latin American culture and history at Williams College and Middlebury College in 1922. In 1923, he moved to Houston, where he taught Spanish and American history at the Rice Institute (now Rice University). This year, Belaúnde married in Paris to Teresa Moreyra y Paz-Soldán, a member of a prominent political family.

Settled down in Miami, he and his brother Rafael were members of the founding faculty of the University of Miami and together established the Latin American Department in 1926. In the University of Miami, Belaúnde was a member of the Board of Trustees (1926–32), Director of the First Pan American Forum (1929–32) and Director of the Pan American Winter Institute (1933). Later, the university conferred upon him the honorary degree of Doctor of Letters (1938) and the Order of Merit (1966).

He was also a lecturer of history at the University of Virginia between 1927 and 1928, the Sorbonne in 1927 and the University of Chicago in 1930. That same year, Belaúnde spent a term at Johns Hopkins University, where he delivered the prestigious Albert Shaw Lectures on Diplomatic History.

In 1938, Belaúnde published Bolívar and the Political Thought of the Spanish American Revolution, one of the main treatises in English on the political thought of Simón Bolívar based in part on the Sorbonne, Miami and Johns Hopkins lectures.

=== Return ===
Belaúnde returned to Peru in 1930 when a military coup led by Commander Luis Miguel Sánchez Cerro overthrew the Leguía's regime. A new interim junta presided by David Samanez Ocampo created a commission to draft a reform project to the Leguiist Constitution and Belaúnde was included as one of the ten members. Accordingly, he was elected Deputy to the Constituent Assembly in 1931 and defended vigorously the right of women to vote in elections, bicameralism and the autonomy of the judiciary.

During this time, Beláunde tried to reincorporate to San Marcos. In 1931, he was a candidate for the Rectorship of the university but was defeated due to the support of the leftist university movement in favor of this opponent. Belaúnde was even denied his tenureship as professor of modern history, which caused indignation in certain academic circles and inevitably led to his definitive departure from San Marcos.

Shortly afterwards, Belaúnde was invited to give some lectures on history of the religions at the Catholic University of Lima (now Pontifical Catholic University of Peru) and then was appointed professor of constitutional law and history of cultures. In 1932, he was elected first Dean of the Faculty of Political and Economical Sciences and then he was Dean of the Faculty of Letters.

Among the positions Belaúnde occupied throughout his professional career were: Secretary of the File of Limits of the Ministry of External Relations of Peru, becoming Secretary in the Diplomatic Mission to Spain and Argentina, Consultant in the bordering negotiations with Brazil, Chargé d'affaires in Germany (1914) and Bolivia (1945), Plenipotentiary Secretary in Uruguay in 1919, Colombia in 1934 and in Switzerland in 1936, President of the Peruvian delegation before the League of Nations then subscribing the San Francisco Charter, which gave origin to the Organization of the United Nations, He was also President of the General Assembly of the United Nations (1959), Rector pro tempore (1946–1947) and finally Rector of the Catholic University of Peru (1965).

He also lectured on Hispanic-American culture throughout various universities in the United States while in exile, such as Columbia University, University of Miami (Doctor honoris causa), and the University of Chicago. In 1930 he delivered the Albert Shaw Lectures on Diplomatic History at Johns Hopkins University. He was elected a Foreign Honorary Member of the American Academy of Arts and Sciences in 1944.

He died in New York City.

== Family ==
Victor Andrés Belaunde was a member of a notable Peruvian political family. His nephew Fernando Belaunde Terry was president twice; his brother Rafael Belaunde Diez Canseco was Prime Minister from 1945 to 1946; and his grandfather Pedro Diez Canseco was also President three times.

== Selected writings ==
- La filosofía del derecho y el método positivo (The Philosophy of Law and the Positivist Method), 1904
- El Perú antiguo y los modernos sociólogos (The Ancient Peru and the Modern Sociologists), 1908
- La medicación Americana en la Guerra del Pacífico (The American Mediation in the War of the Pacific), 1910
- Causas diplomáticas de la Guerra del Pacífico (Diplomatic Causes to the War of the Pacific), 1910
- Los mitos amazónicos y el imperio de los incas (Amazonian Myths and the Empire of the Incas), 1911
- Las expediciones de los incas a la hoya amazónica (The expeditions of the Incas to the Amazon basin), 1911
- "The Alienation of the Latin-American Mind From Christianity," Biblical Review, Vol. 8 (1923): 578–586.
- Bolivar and the Political Thought of the Spanish American Revolution (Baltimore: Johns Hopkins Press: 1938).
- "Incan Communism and Bolshevism"

Diplomatic posts
| Preceded by Charles Habib Malik | President of the United Nations General Assembly; 1959–1960 | Succeeded by Frederick Henry Boland |

Diplomatic posts
| Preceded by Manuel Cisneros | Peruvian Minister of Foreign Affairs; 1958 | Succeeded by Raúl Porras Barrenechea |
