= César Landa =

Peruvian professor and politician

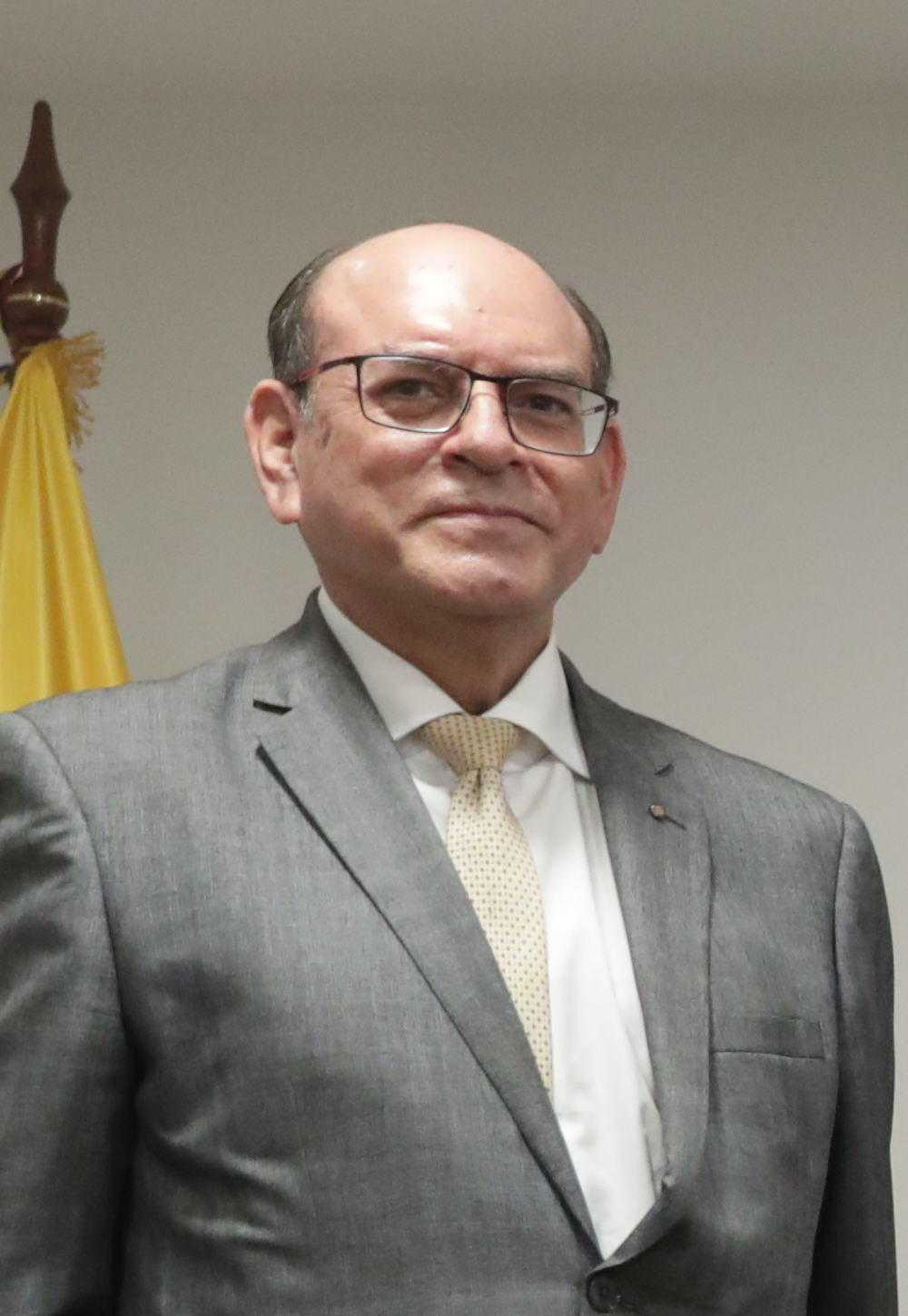

Minister of Foreign Relations
- In office 13 September 2022 – 7 December 2022
- President: Pedro Castillo
- Prime Minister: Héctor Valer; Aníbal Torres; Betssy Chávez
- Preceded by: Miguel Rodríguez Mackay
- Succeeded by: Ana Gervasi
- In office 1 February 2022 – 5 August 2022
- Preceded by: Óscar Maúrtua
- Succeeded by: Miguel Rodríguez Mackay

President of the Constitutional Court of Peru
- In office 2006–2008
- Preceded by: Víctor García Toma
- Succeeded by: Carlos Mesía

Personal details
- Born: César Rodrigo Landa Arroyo; 15 June 1958 (age 68) Lima, Peru
- Party: Independent
- Education: Pontifical Catholic University of Peru
- Profession: Lawyer

César Rodrigo Landa Arroyo (born 15 June 1958) is a Peruvian professor and politician. He served as Minister of Foreign Relations of Peru intermittently from February to December 2022 under the presidency of Pedro Castillo. He also served as president of the Constitutional Court of Peru between 2006 and 2008, and vice minister of Justice in 2004.

== Political career ==
In 2003, Landa was appointed ad hoc judge of the Inter-American Court of Human Rights, a position he resigned in 2004.

=== Vice Minister of Justice ===
In February 2004, Landa was appointed Vice Minister of Justice by President Alejandro Toledo. As such, he was a representative before the National Human Rights Council and representative of the Peruvian State before the Committee of Experts of the Follow-up Mechanism for the Implementation of the Inter-American Convention against Corruption. In December, Congress elected him a magistrate of the Constitutional Court.

=== President of the Constitutional Court ===
In 2006, Landa was appointed president of the Constitutional Court, a position he held until 2008.

=== Minister of Foreign Affairs ===
On 1 February 2022, President Pedro Castillo appointed Landa as foreign minister. He held that position until 5 August when Castillo reshuffled his cabinet. On 13 September, thirty-nine days after being replaced, he was again appointed and installed by President Castillo as foreign minister. This came after his predecessor, Miguel Rodríguez Mackay resigned due to differences with President Castillo. He resigned again on 7 December in the wake of the 2022 Peruvian self-coup d'état attempt.
