= Alberto Rey de Castro y Romaña =

Peruvian politician and diplomat

Prime Minister of Peru
- In office 18 May 1934 – 25 December 1934
- President: Oscar R. Benavides
- Preceded by: José de la Riva-Agüero y Osma
- Succeeded by: Carlos Arenas y Loayza

Minister of Justice
- In office 18 May 1934 – 25 December 1934
- President: Oscar R. Benavides
- Preceded by: José de la Riva-Agüero y Osma
- Succeeded by: Carlos Arenas y Loayza

Minister of Foreign Affairs
- In office 5 September 1934 – 18 September 1934
- President: Oscar R. Benavides
- Preceded by: Solón Polo
- Succeeded by: Carlos Concha Cárdenas

Personal details
- Born: 1 July 1869 Arequipa, Peru
- Died: 18 May 1961 (aged 91) Arequipa, Peru
- Spouse: María López de Romaña y López de Romaña
- Profession: diplomat

Alberto Rey de Castro y Romaña (1 July 1869–18 May 1961) was a Peruvian politician and diplomat. He was Prime Minister of Peru, Minister of Justice, and Minister of Foreign Relations in 1934.

Rey de Castro was born in Arequipa, Peru. His parents were Ezequiel Rey de Castro y Maria Manuela de Romaña y Bustamante. He received his early education in Lima at Colegio de la Inmaculada and Liceo Carolino and obtained his PhD from the University of San Agustin de Arequipa.

He served as Plenipotentiary Minister in Ecuador and other nations.
