= Instituto Antártico Peruano =

Peruvian government organism

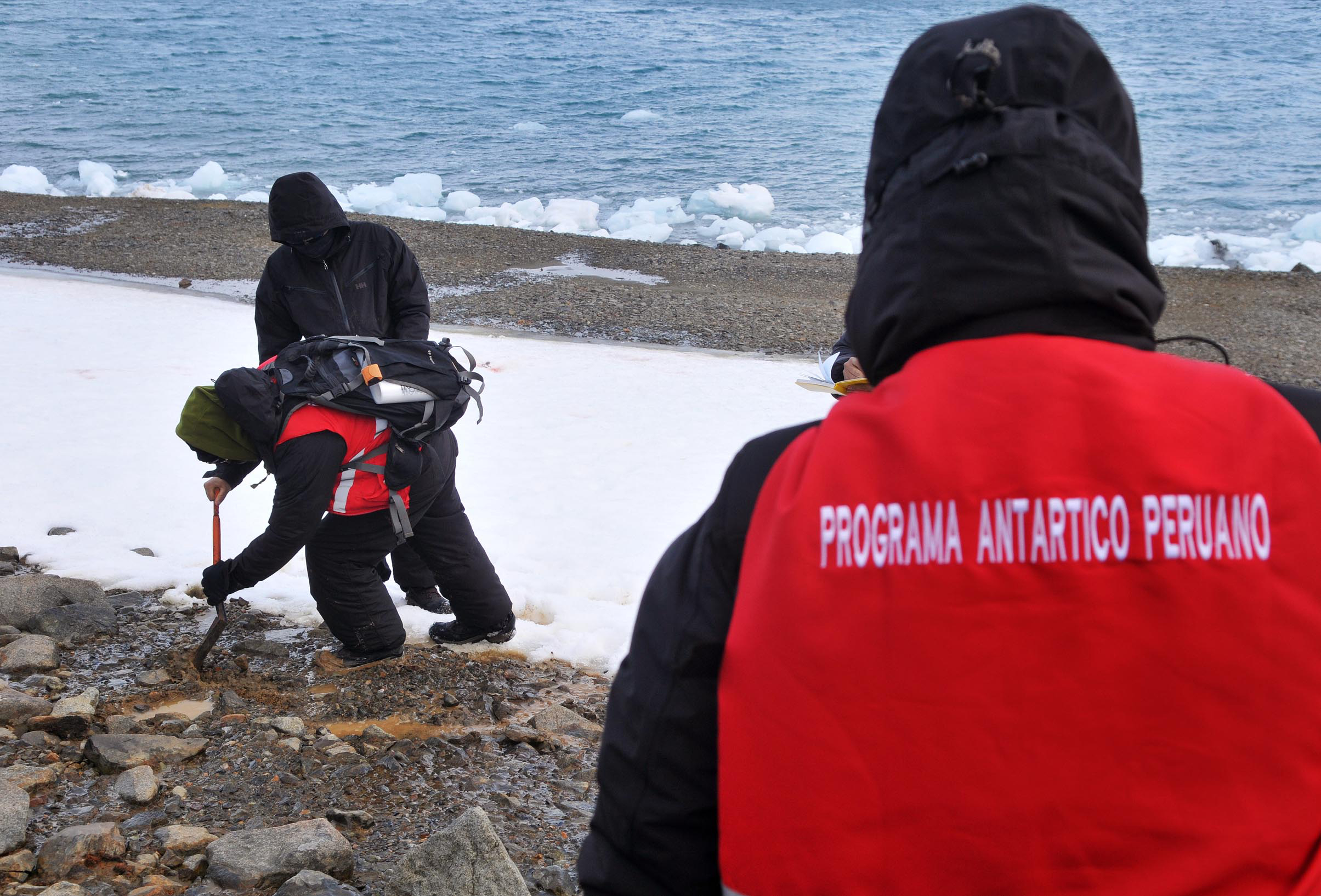
Peruvian researchers working in Antarctica

The Instituto Antártico Peruano (INANPE) it is the government organisation that centralizes the planning, coordination and control of scientific activities of the Republic of Peru in the Antarctica. It was created the November 20, 2002 and it has its headquarters in Lima, Peru.

== History ==
=== Background ===
The Comision Nacional de Asuntos Antarticos (CONAAN) was created the July 11, 1983 by Supreme Decree 9-83-RE. It was a technical organism conformed by various sectors of the public Peruvian administration, charged with advising the government on antarctic issues such as juridical and political aspects, and the economical, scientific and technical aspects. Mainly it was encharged of the redaction and execution of the antarctic politic of Peru and of the Peruvian Antarctic program.

=== Creation ===
The November 20 2002, the law No 27870 (named "Ley del Instituto Antartico Peruano") was published at the official newspaper El Peruano. Approved by the Peruvian Congress and enacted by the President of the Republic, that restructured the CONAAN, constituting the Instituto Antártico Peruano (INANPE) like a decentralized organism with juridic personality with scientific, technical, functional, economical and administrative autonomy depending on the Ministerio de Relaciones Exteriores to safeguard the Peruvian interest in the Antarctica.

== Objectives ==
The Instituto Antártico Peruano is the entity charged to formulate, coordinate, conduct and supervise in integral way the national antarctic politic, such as all the activities that public and private entities make in the Antarctica.

== Structure ==
The Instituto Antártico Peruano has the following structure:

- Directive Council
- Scientific Counselors Committee
- Executive Secretary
- Line Organisms.
