= Manuel Yrigoyen Arias =

Peruvian lawyer, diplomat, academic and politician

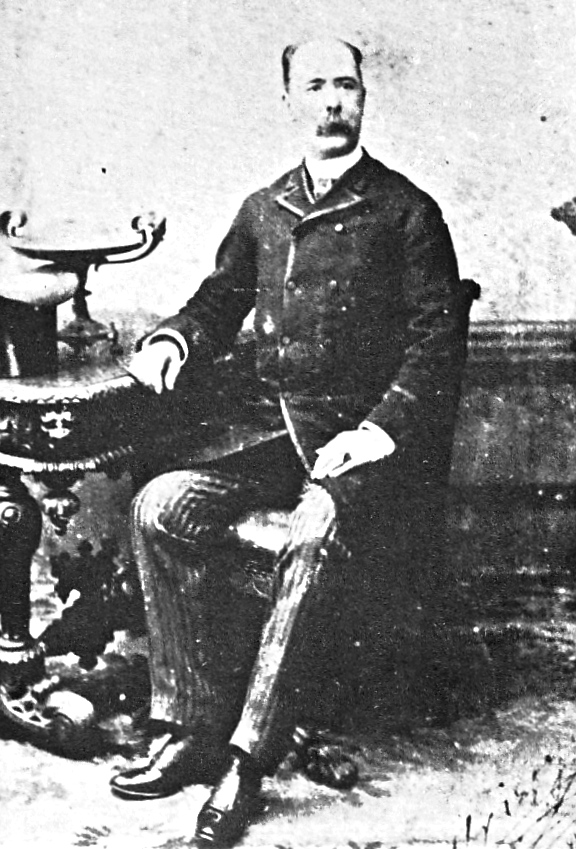
Manuel Irigoyen Larrea

Manuel Irigoyen Arias y Larrea (March 31, 1829 – June 5, 1912) was a Peruvian lawyer, diplomat, historian, academic and politician. He graduated from the National University of San Marcos and served on its faculty. He was a member of the Chamber of Deputies of Peru and Senate of Peru. He served as minister of foreign affairs and economy and finance (1886-1887) in the Government of Peru, also serving as Ambassador to Belgium from 1861 to 1865, to Ambassador to Brazil from 1874 to 1877 and to Uruguay on two occasions. He was three times Prime Minister of Peru (December 1878 – May 1879, February–August 1890, November 1894 – March 20, 1895). He served as the President of the Senate from 1905 to 1906 and of the National Club (1901-1902).

Preceded by José Jorge Loayza	Prime Minister of Peru; December 17, 1878 – May 19, 1879	Succeeded by Manuel de Mendiburu
Preceded by Pedro Alejandrino del Solar Gabans	Prime Minister of Peru; February 11 – August 10, 1890	Succeeded by Augusto Huaman-Velasco Billinghurst
Preceded by Cesáreo Chacaltana Reyes	Prime Minister of Peru; November 16, 1894 – March 20, 1895	Succeeded by Antonio Bentín y La Fuente

== Bibliography ==
- Basadre Grohmann, Jorge: Historia de la República del Perú. 1822 - 1933, Octava Edición, corregida y aumentada. Tomos 7, 8 y 9. Editada por el Diario "La República" de Lima y la Universidad "Ricardo Palma". Impreso en Santiago de Chile, 1998.
- Tauro del Pino, Alberto: Enciclopedia Ilustrada del Perú. Tercera Edición. Tomo 8. HAB/IZQ. Lima, PEISA, 2001. ISBN 9972-40-157-X
- Publicación del diario El Comercio de Lima, de fecha Jueves 6 de junio de 1912.
