= Óscar Maúrtua =

Peruvian diplomat and jurist

Óscar Maúrtua de Romaña OM OSP OL OSC
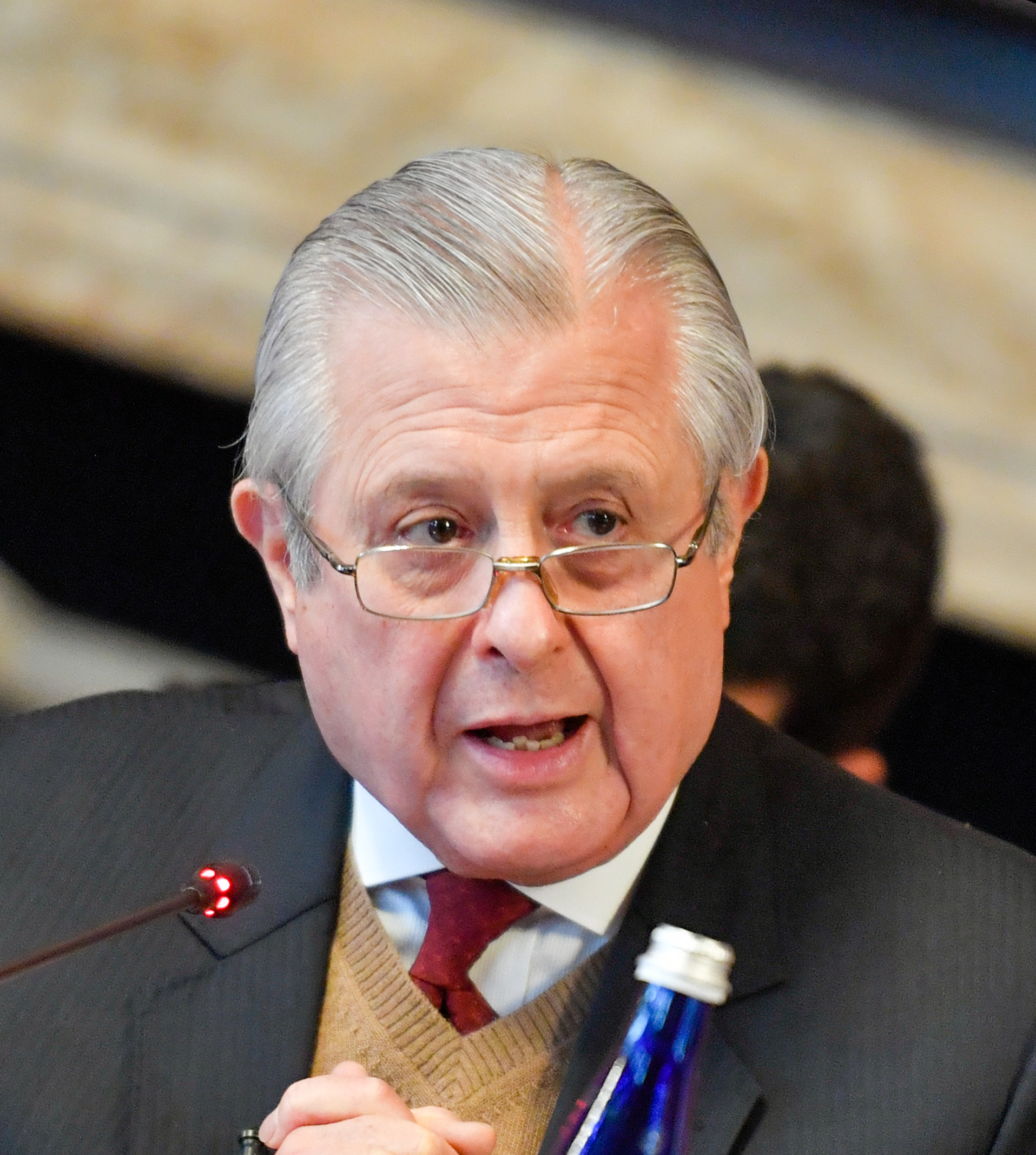

Minister of Foreign Relations
- In office 20 August 2021 – 1 February 2022
- President: Pedro Castillo
- Prime Minister: Guido Bellido; Mirtha Vásquez
- Deputy: Luis Enrique Chávez
- Preceded by: Héctor Béjar
- Succeeded by: César Landa
- In office 16 August 2005 – 28 July 2006
- President: Alejandro Toledo
- Prime Minister: Pedro Pablo Kuczynski
- Deputy: Javier Gonzales Terrones; Harold Forsyth
- Preceded by: Fernando Olivera
- Succeeded by: José Antonio García Belaúnde

Deputy Minister-Secretary General of Foreign Relations
- In office 31 June 2005 – 16 August 2005
- President: Alejandro Toledo
- Prime Minister: Carlos Ferrero
- Minister: Manuel Rodríguez Cuadros; Fernando Olivera
- Preceded by: Armando Lecaros de Cossío
- Succeeded by: Javier Gonzáles Terrones

Secretary General of the Presidency
- In office 28 July 1980 – 28 July 1985
- President: Fernando Belaúnde
- Succeeded by: Enrique Cornejo

Personal details
- Born: Óscar José Ricardo Maúrtua de Romaña; February 7, 1947 (age 79) Lima, Peru
- Party: Independent
- Parent(s): Óscar Maúrtua Moyano; Juana de Romaña y García
- Education: Pontifical Catholic University of Peru (BA); National University of San Marcos (LLB); Diplomatic Academy of Peru (BA); University of Oxford (MA)
- Profession: Diplomat

Óscar José Ricardo Maúrtua de Romaña (born 7 February 1947) is a Peruvian diplomat and jurist who served as Minister of Foreign Relations of Peru from August 2021 to February 2022, under the presidency of Pedro Castillo. He previously occupied the office under President Alejandro Toledo during the last of year of his presidency.

A career diplomat since 1968, Maúrtua served throughout his career as the Peruvian ambassador to many countries, such as Canada, Bolivia, Thailand, Vietnam, Laos, and Ecuador. He also served as Fernando Belaúnde's chief of staff during his second presidency (1980–1985).

Maúrtua serves as president of the Peruvian International Law Society since 2017.

== Minister of Foreign Relations ==
Maúrtua was appointed by president Alejandro Toledo as Minister of Foreign Relations for the first time on 16 August 2005, following the resignation of Carlos Ferrero's cabinet five days earlier, which prompted newly inaugurated foreign minister, Fernando Olivera, a controversial politician, to resign. He served under Pedro Pablo Kuczynski's premiership until the end to Toledo's presidency.

Sixteen years later, Maúrtua would be called up to assume the ministry for a second time under Pedro Castillo's presidency and Guido Bellido's premiership, following Héctor Béjar's resignation amidst the political instability generated by the latter's unfortunate statements regarding the rise of terrorism in Peru, as he blamed the Peruvian Navy and the CIA on the matter. Maúrtua's appointment has been considered a reversal of Castillo's initial left-wing foreign policy initiated under Béjar, generating criticism from the governing Free Peru's hard-left representatives.

On 1 February 2022, Maúrtua was succeeded as minister by constitutionalist César Landa after President Pedro Castillo did not ratify him in his second cabinet reshuffle.
