= José Fabio Melgar Valdivieso =

Peruvian lawyer, diplomat and politician

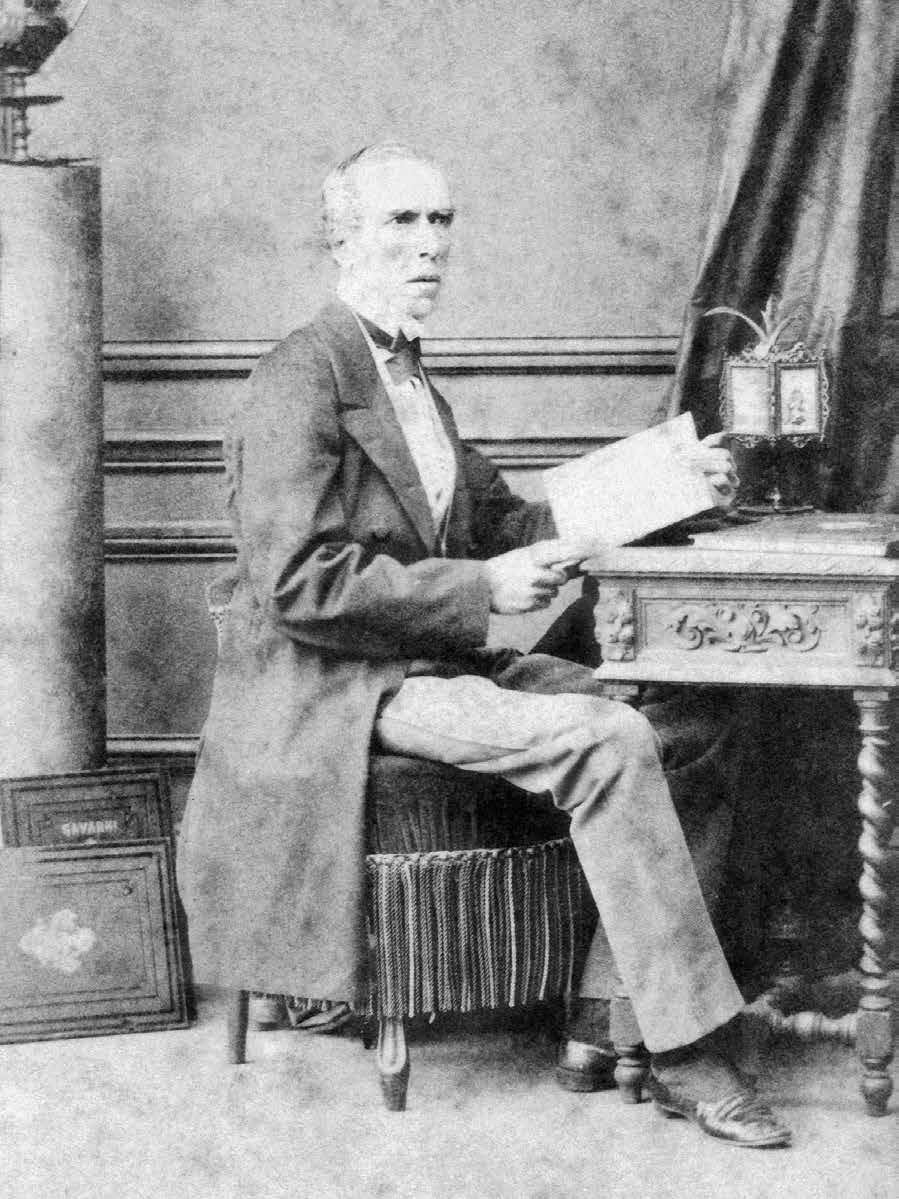
- Born: February 26, 1802; Arequipa, Viceroyalty of Peru
- Died: 1884; Lima, Peru
- Predecessor: Miguel del Carpio y Melgar
- Successor: Juan Oviedo
- Parent: Juan de Dios Melgar Sanabria y Andrea Valdivieso

José Fabio Melgar Valdivieso (February 26, 1802 – 1884) was a Peruvian lawyer, diplomat and politician. He was Minister of Foreign Affairs four times Minister of Finance and Commerce three times and Minister of Justice once, Instruction and Charity (1859-1860), & Worship and Public Works (1860).

== Biography ==
He was the son of Juan de Dios Melgar Sanabria and Andrea Valdivieso, and brother of the famous poet Mariano Melgar, hero of the War of Independence who was shot in 1815 by the royalists. He studied in his hometown and then went to Lima, where he graduated as a lawyer in 1834.

He entered the public administration service, as a second officer of the Ministry of Finance, rising to senior officer. He stood out for his honesty and efficiency. He eventually served in the Ministry of Foreign Affairs as a senior officer, temporarily taking charge of said office for a few days in August 1844, due to the lack of a head.

During the first government of Ramón Castilla he accidentally assumed the Treasury portfolio(unsure what this is) from August to December 1846, and then took charge of it for a longer period, from July 1849 to April 1851.

During the government of General José Rufino Echenique, he was proposed by General Manuel de Mendiburu to be Minister of Finance, but this was opposed by General Juan Crisóstomo Torrico, who was not interested in such a designation because he was interested in profit. with the benefits of internal debt consolidation.

In the second government of Ramón Castilla he again took over as Minister of Finance (1855-1856); and then as Minister of Foreign Affairs (1857-1858 and 1859). He was simultaneously in charge of the Ministry of War and Navy when its head, General Miguel de San Román, had to leave the capital to fight the revolution in Arequipa. And when the Council of Ministers was organized in obedience to the provisions of the Constitution of 1856, he assumed the portfolio of Justice, Instruction and Charity (1859-1860), and briefly, & Worship and Public Works (1860). At some point he also assumed the vice presidency of the Council of Ministers.

He then returned to head the Ministry of Foreign Affairs, from June 1860 to November 1861, replacing his nephew Miguel del Carpio y Melgar. At the head of the Peruvian Foreign Ministry, he defended the interests of Peru before Ecuador and Bolivia; and he addressed two circulars to the governments of America (November 14 and 20, 1861), vigorously protesting against the interference of the European powers in the Dominican Republic, Ecuador and Mexico.

At the end of the government of Castile, he was again appointed Minister of Finance, a position he held from May to June 1862.

Among the various public positions that he subsequently held, is that of president of the High Court of Accounts, and that of member of the Advisory Commission of Administration in the Ministry of Government (1873).

Retired from public life, he dedicated himself to recreating the legend of his brother, the poet Mariano Melgar, collecting traditions and memories, with which he drew up a biography, which Francisco García Calderón Landa incorporated in the first compilation of the poems of the famous Arequipa poet. (1878), which was later reproduced by Manuel Rafael Valdivia in the Lira Arequipeña (1889).

The exact date of his death is unknown, but is assumed to have been sometime after the Pacific War.
