= Manuel Cisneros Sánchez =

Peruvian lawyer, journalist and politician (1904–1971)

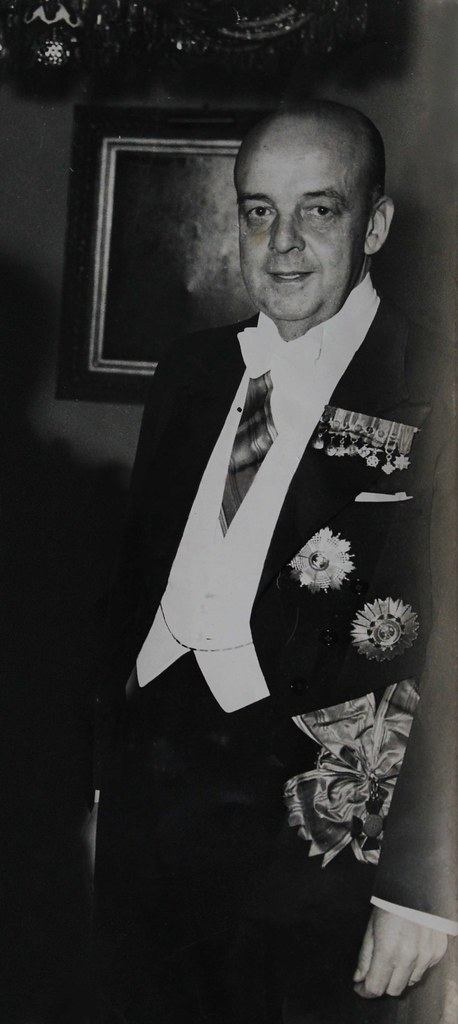
Manuel Cisneros Sánchez

Manuel Cisneros Sánchez (1 November 1904 – 14 September 1971) served as Prime Minister of Peru for two terms and also initiated the Pradist Democratic Movement.

Political offices
Preceded by Alfredo Solf y Muro	Prime Minister of Peru; 1944–1945	Succeeded by Rafael Belaúnde Diez Canseco
Preceded by Roque Augusto Saldías Maninat	Prime Minister of Peru; 1956–1958	Succeeded by Luis Gallo Porras
Preceded by Félix Huamán Izquierdo	Peruvian Minister of Foreign Affairs; 1956–1958	Succeeded by Víctor Andrés Belaúnde
