= Ismael Bielich-Flores =

Peruvian lawyer and politician

Ismael Adriano Roman Bielich Flóres (28 February 1897 – 2 December 1966) was a Peruvian lawyer and politician.

Born in Lima to a father of Croatian descent, he was the co-founder of the Aprista movement (a political party headed by Haya de la Torre), served as Senator and later as Minister of Justice (1945–1946), later, president of the Christian Democrat Party and co-founder also of the Partido Popular Cristiano (Christian People's Party or PPC) in Peru, he was professor of law at the University of San Marcos in Lima and at the Faculty of Law of the Pontifical Catholic University of Peru.
