= David Aguilar Cornejo =

Peruvian politician (1902–1982)

Senator of the Republic of Peru Representing Lima
- In office July 28, 1963 – November 3, 1968

Personal details
- Born: January 29, 1902 Callao, Peru
- Died: July 11, 1982 Lima, Peru
- Party: Odriist National Union
- Education: San Marcos University
- Awards: Order of Isabella the Catholic, Grand Cross (1954)

David Aguilar Cornejo (Callao; January 29, 1902 – Lima; July 11, 1982) was a Peruvian criminal lawyer and politician. He was Minister of Foreign Affairs between 1954 and 1955, during the constitutional government of General Manuel A. Odría. He was one of the founders of the Odriist National Union, as well as a senator (1963–1968). He presided over the Senate in the legislatures of 1965–1966 and 1967–1968.

== Biography ==
His parents were David Aguilar and Juana Cornejo. He completed his primary studies at the San Luis Gonzaga National School in Ica, and then his secondary studies at the College of Our Lady of Guadalupe in Lima. He entered the University of San Marcos, where he graduated with a bachelor's degree in Law in 1929. He finally graduated as a lawyer, practicing his profession especially as a criminal lawyer.

In the field of politics, he successively supported the presidential candidacies of José María de la Jara y Ureta (1931), José Quesada Larrea (1939) and Eloy G. Ureta (1945), all of which were unsuccessful. In 1950 he was political secretary in the electoral campaign of General Manuel A. Odría, who triumphed without counting any rivals.

During Odría's presidency, he was legal advisor to the Council of Ministers (1951-1955) and Minister of Foreign Affairs, a position he held from August 11, 1954 to December 2, 1955. Due to his absence, he was replaced on an interim basis on several occasions by Alberto Freundt Rosell.

During his time as Chancellor, he detained Aristotle Onassis' fishing fleet for whaling without an official permit. His ships were detained in the port of Callao until the corresponding fine was paid.

He later joined the board of directors of the Odriist National Union (1961). He was elected senator for Lima in 1963. During this period, he represented Ingrid Schwend in her high-profile murder trial. He became president of his chamber in two terms: 1965-66 and 1967-68, in accordance with what was agreed with his allies from the American Popular Revolutionary Alliance, in the sense of alternating the directives of the Parliament. His parliamentary term, which was to end in 1969, was frustrated by the coup d'état of 1968.

== Bibliography ==
- Chirinos Soto, Enrique (1985). Historia de la República / 1930 -1985 (in Spanish). Vol. II. Desde Sánchez Cerro hasta Alan García. Lima: AFA Editores.
- Tauro del Pino, Alberto (2001). Enciclopedia Ilustrada del Perú. Vol. 1 (AAA/ANG) (3rd ed.). Lima: PEISA. ISBN 9972-40-150-2.
