= José Jorge Loayza =

Peruvian lawyer, judge and politician

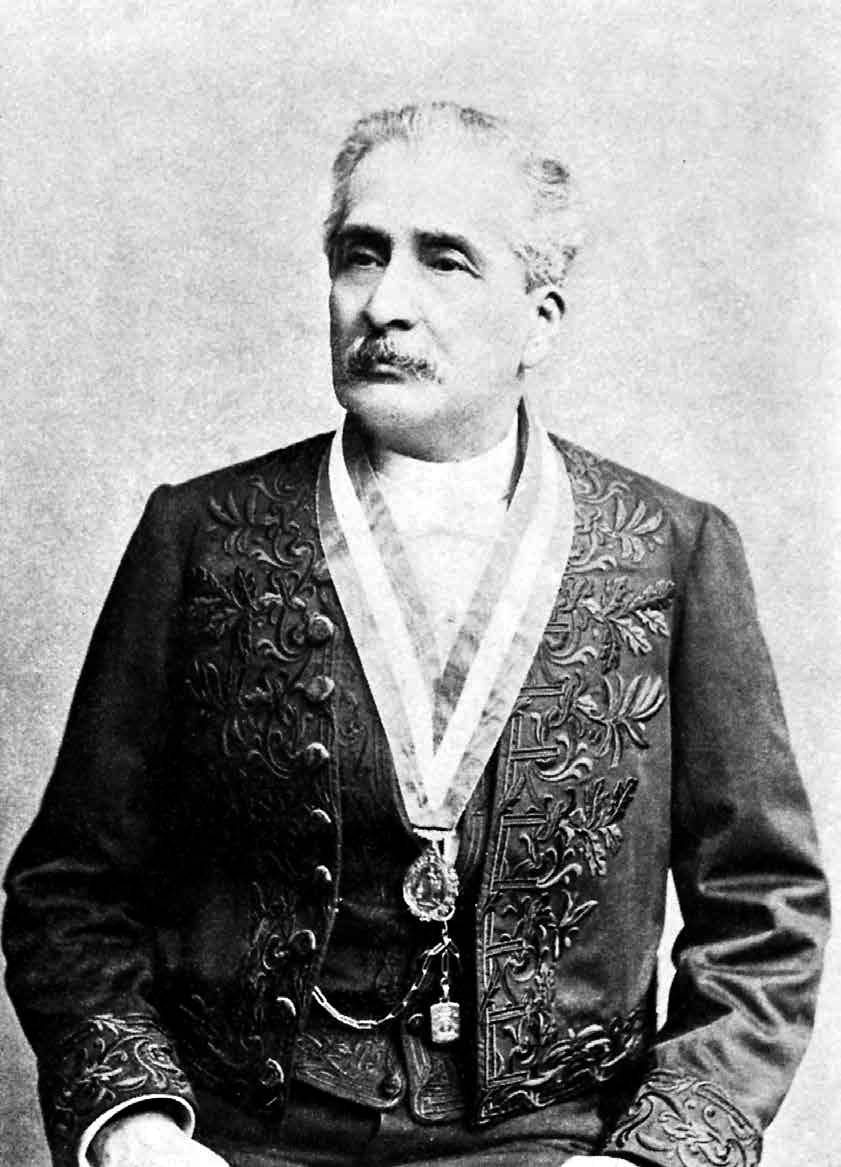

José Jorge Loayza (April 23, 1827 – May 28, 1904) was a Peruvian lawyer, judge and politician. He was born in Lima, Peru. Loayza served as minister of finance in 1865, foreign affairs and justice in the Government of Peru. He was three times Prime Minister of Peru (1872, June–December 1878, May 1898-September 1899).

| Preceded by Mariano Dorado | Minister of Foreign Affairs of Peru; May 27, 1870-July 25, 1872 | Succeeded by Juan Antonio Ribeyro |
| Preceded by José Allende | Prime Minister of Peru; 1872 | Succeeded by José Miguel Medina |
| Preceded by Manuel Morales | Minister of Justice of Peru; June 18-December 16, 1878 | Succeeded by Mariano Felipe Paz Soldán |
| Preceded by Juan Buendía | Prime Minister of Peru; June 18 - December 17, 1878 | Succeeded by Manuel Irigoyen Larrea |
| Preceded by José Eusebio Sánchez | President of the Supreme Court of Peru; 1893-1895 | Succeeded by Juan Esteban Guzmán |
| Preceded by José Antonio de Lavalle y Pardo | Minister of Justice of Peru; May 16, 1898-September 8, 1899 | Succeeded by Eleodoro Romero Salcedo |
| Preceded by Alejandro López de Romaña Alvizuri | Prime Minister of Peru; May 16, 1898 - September 8, 1899 | Succeeded by Manuel María Gálvez Egúsquiza |
| Preceded by Enrique de la Riva Agüero | interim Minister of Foreign Affairs; May 16-June 5, 1898 | Succeeded by Melitón F. Porras Osores |

== Bibliography ==
- Basadre, Jorge: Historia de la República del Perú. 1822 - 1933, Octava Edición, corregida y aumentada. Tomos 5 y 6. Editada por el Diario "La República" de Lima y la Universidad "Ricardo Palma". Impreso en Santiago de Chile, 1998.
- Tauro del Pino, Alberto: Enciclopedia Ilustrada del Perú. Tercera Edición. Tomo 10. LLO/MEN. Lima, PEISA, 2001. ISBN 9972-40-159-6
