= Ana Gervasi =

Peruvian diplomat (1966–2024)

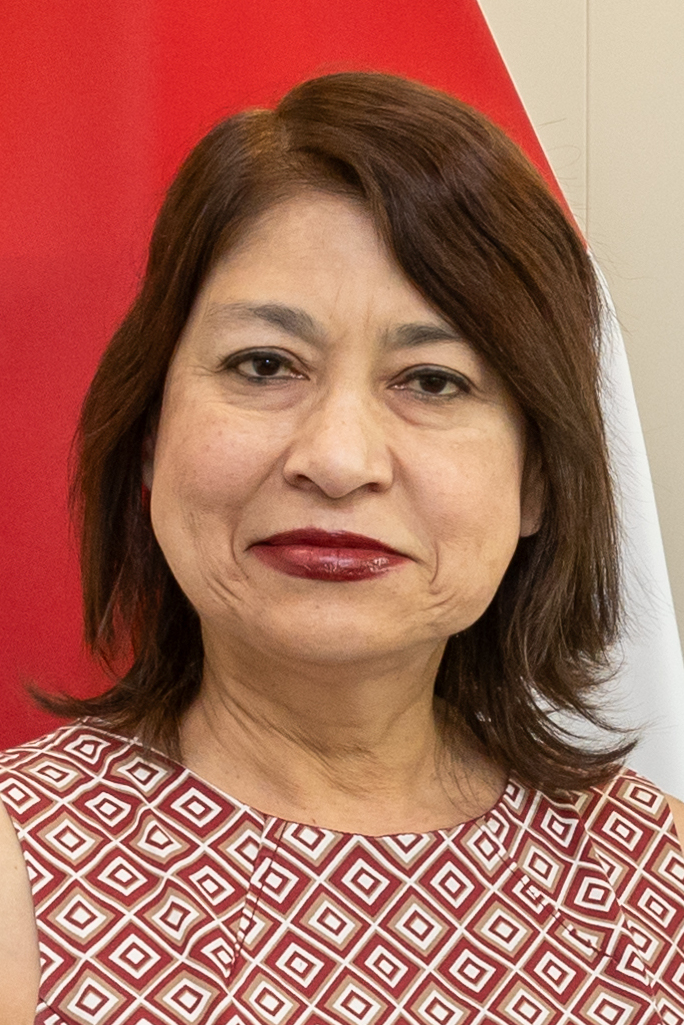
- Gervasi in 2023

Minister of Foreign Affairs
- In office 10 December 2022 – 6 November 2023
- President: Dina Boluarte
- Prime Minister: Pedro Angulo Arana; Alberto Otárola
- Preceded by: César Landa
- Succeeded by: Javier González-Olaechea

Personal details
- Born: Ana Cecilia Gervasi Diaz; 1 December 1966
- Died: c. 4 September 2024 (aged 57) Lima, Peru
- Party: Independent
- Education: Pontifical Catholic University of Peru; London School of Economics; University of Buenos Aires; Graduate Institute of International and Development Studies
- Profession: Diplomat

Ana Cecilia Gervasi Diaz (1 December 1966 – c. 4 September 2024) was a Peruvian diplomat who was the country's Minister of Foreign Affairs between 10 December 2022 and 6 November 2023. Prior to this post, Gervasi served in diplomatic posts in Canada and the United States and at the United Nations at Geneva and the World Trade Organization.

== Education ==
Gervasi held a law degree from the Pontifical Catholic University of Peru and postgraduate degrees in international relations and diplomacy from the Diplomatic Academy of Peru. She held a master's degree in international relations from the London School of Economics, specialized in multilateral diplomacy at the Graduate Institute of International and Development Studies in Geneva, and completed doctoral studies at the University of Buenos Aires.

== Diplomatic career ==
A career diplomat, Gervasi worked as General Director of Economic Affairs, Economic Promotion and Investment Promotion at Peru's Ministry of Foreign Affairs. She was also at different junctures Peru's Consul General in Toronto and Washington DC, and a counsellor and delegate of Peru to the United Nations in New York City and Geneva, and to the World Trade Organization.

Gervasi was Deputy Minister of Foreign Trade and was then appointed Deputy Minister of Foreign Affairs in August 2022, the first woman to hold the post.

=== Foreign Affairs Minister ===
Gervasi was appointed Minister of Foreign Affairs as part of President Dina Boluarte's new cabinet on 10 December 2022, following the arrest and impeachment of Pedro Castillo. None of the 17 ministers appointed were members of a political party with any seats in Congress. On 13 December, Gervasi summoned the ambassadors of Mexico, Bolivia, Argentina, and Colombia after their governments had signed a joint communique expressing concerns over Castillo's dismissal and arrest. Gervasi said on Twitter she "reiterated to them that the presidential succession is constitutional and that the decisions of former president Castillo on December 7 materialized a coup d'état".

Gervasi resigned as minister on 6 November 2023 after she failed to secure a bilateral meeting between Boluarte and U.S. President Joe Biden at a summit in Washington. A formal meeting with Biden at the White House was considered an important step in gaining international legitimacy for the Boluarte administration following Castillo's arrest.

== Death ==
On 4 September 2024, Gervasi returned from Switzerland where she was working as a diplomat. That same day, she suffered a fall and injured her leg but refused to receive medical help. That was the last day she was seen alive. Gervasi was found dead at her apartment in Miraflores, Lima, on 8 September 2024. She was 57. Police were called to her home after she had not been heard from for several days preceding her death.
