= Enrique de la Riva-Agüero y Riglos =

Peruvian politician and diplomat (1857–1930)

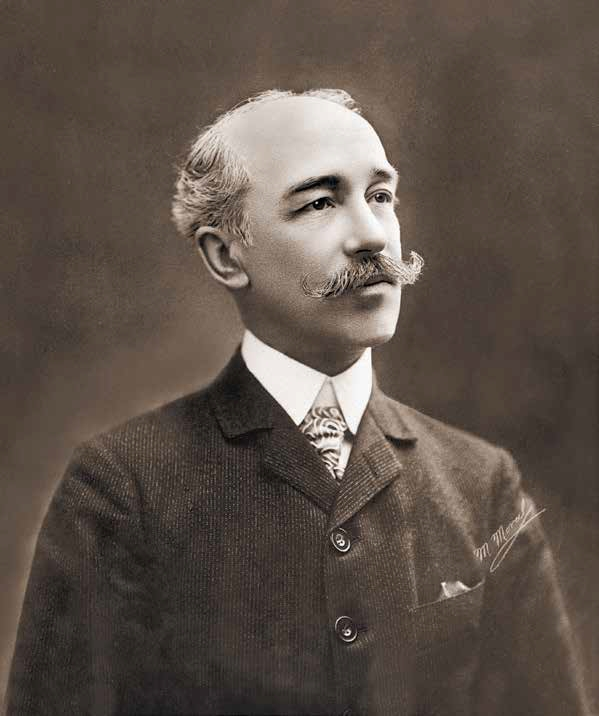
Enrique de la Riva-Agüero

Enrique de la Riva-Agüero y Riglos (September 6, 1857 – July 10, 1930) was a Peruvian lawyer, diplomat and politician. He was a member of the Civilista Party. He was born in Lima, Peru. He graduated from the National University of San Marcos and served on its faculty. He was a member of the Chamber of Deputies of Peru and Senate of Peru. He served three times as foreign minister of Peru (August 1896–May 1898, December 1899–August 1900, August 1915–July 1917) and twice as Prime Minister of Peru (December 1899–August 1900, August 1915–July 1917). He died in Rome, Italy.

== Written works ==
- “Centralización y descentralización”, tesis con la que obtuvo el bachillerato en Ciencias Políticas y Administrativas, en 1877.
- “Cuestión internacional del Huáscar”, tesis con la que obtuvo el doctorado en Ciencias Políticas y Administrativas, en 1878.
- “El gobierno federal”, tesis con la que obtuvo el bachillerato en Jurisprudencia, en 1879.
- Actitud de la escuadra inglesa durante la sublevación del monitor "Huáscar", el 6 de mayo de 1877 (1878).

Preceded by Ricardo Ortiz de Zevallos y Tagle	Minister of Foreign Affairs of Peru; August 10, 1896–May 16, 1898	Succeeded by José Jorge Loayza
Preceded by Manuel María Gálvez Egúsquiza	Prime Minister of Peru; December 14, 1899–August 30, 1900	Succeeded by Enrique Coronel Zegarra y Cortés
Preceded by Manuel María Gálvez Egúsquiza	Minister of Foreign Affairs of Peru; December 14, 1899–August 31, 1900	Succeeded by Felipe de Osma y Pardo
Preceded by Carlos Isaac Abril Galindo	Prime Minister of Peru; September 24, 1915–July 27, 1917	Succeeded by Francisco Tudela y Varela
Preceded by Solón Polo	Minister of Foreign Affairs of Peru; August 18, 1915–July 27, 1917	Succeeded by Francisco Tudela y Varela
