= Cementerio Presbítero Matías Maestro =

Cemetery in Lima, Peru

Coordinates: 12.0410°S 77.0080°W

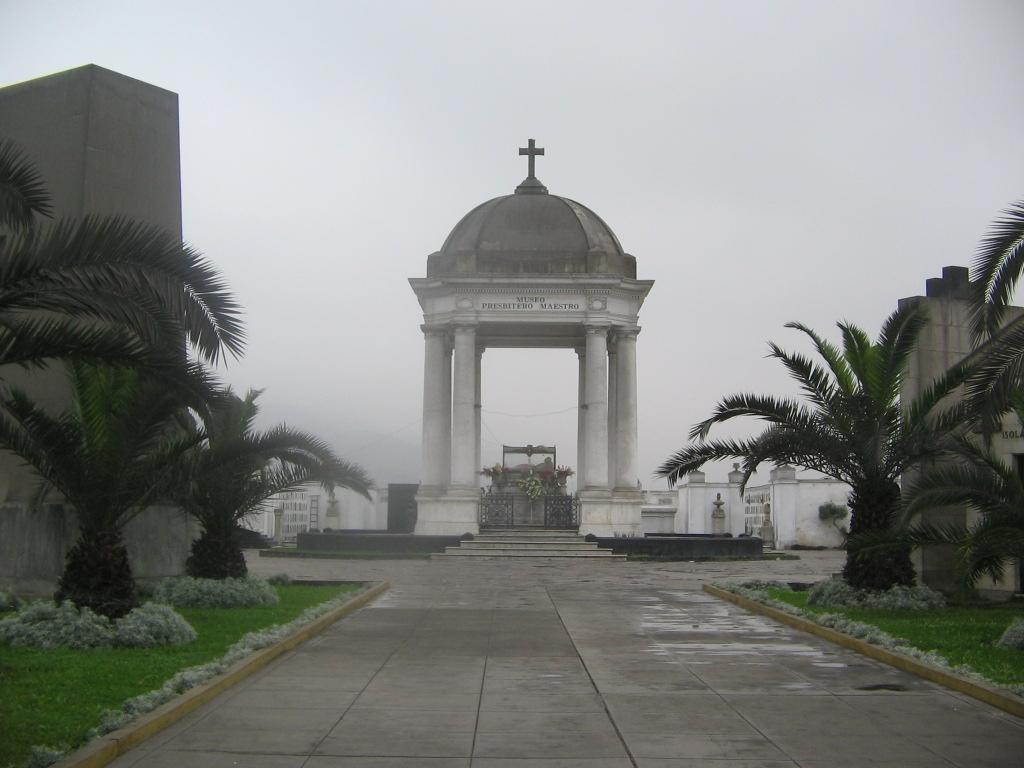
- Interactive map of Cementerio Presbítero Matías Maestro

Details
- Established: 1810
- Location: Lima District, Peru
- Owned by: Charity of Lima

Presbyter Matías Maestro Cemetery (Spanish: Cementerio Presbítero Matías Maestro), formerly the General Cemetery of Lima (Spanish: Cementerio General de Lima), is a cemetery, museum and historical monument located in the Barrios Altos neighbourhood of Lima District, in Lima, Peru. Inaugurated on May 31, 1808, it was the first pantheon in the city since burials were previously held in the city's churches. It was named in honour of its designer, Spanish priest Matías Maestro.

Its 766 mausoleums and 92 historical monuments of the most refined architecture of the 19th and 20th centuries keep the remains of several important political, military and literary figures of Peru, as well as the Crypt of Heroes (Spanish: Cripta de los Héroes) monument, a mausoleum erected in honor of the heroes of the War of the Pacific.

== History ==
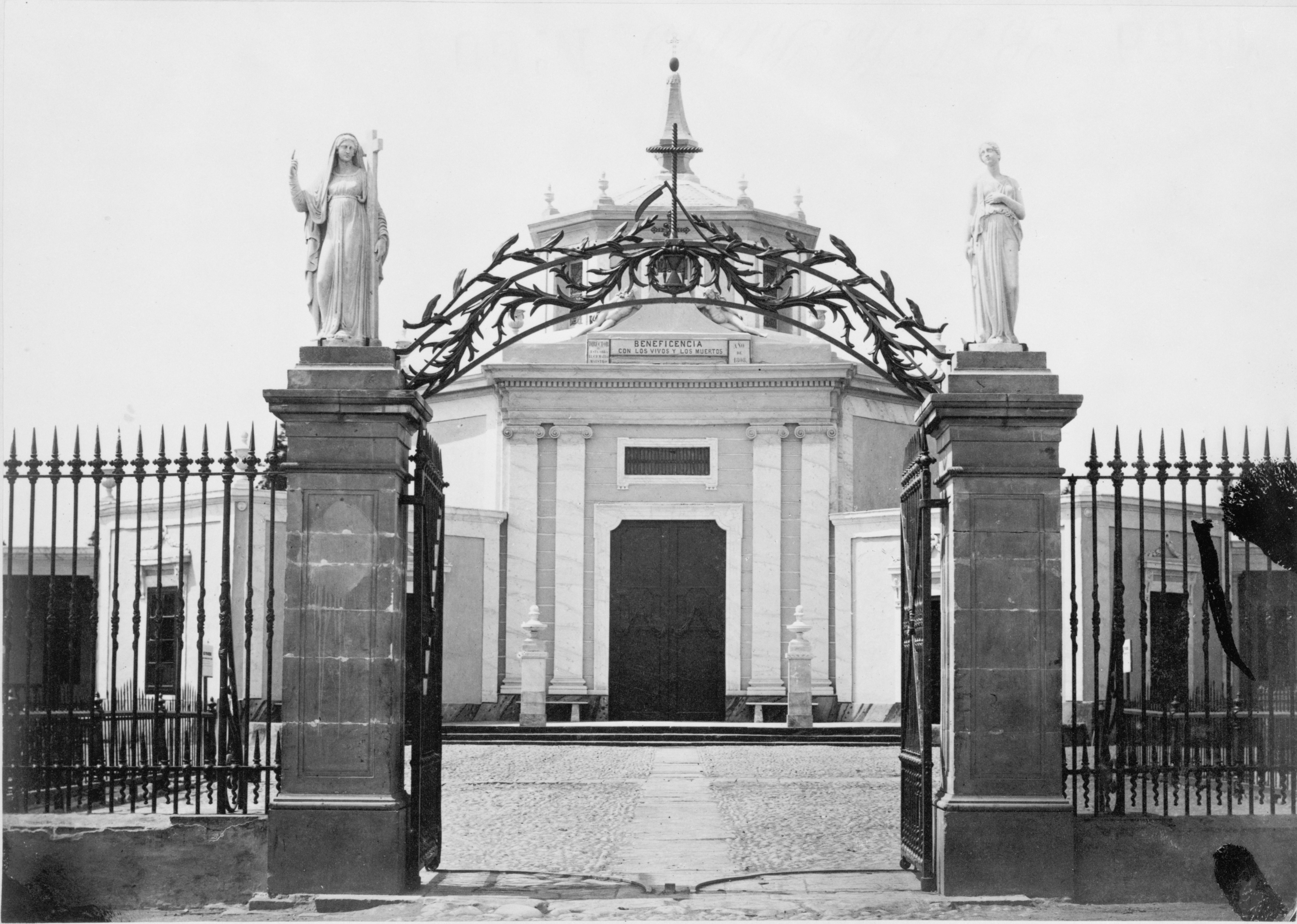
The cemetery's former chapel in 1868.

The General Cemetery of Lima was the first civil cemetery in America. It was initially faced with the opposition of the population that was accustomed to burying their dead in the atrium or under the churches and convents in crypts or catacombs. Its inauguration in 1808 was headed by Viceroy José Fernando de Abascal, under the direction of the Vitorian architect, sculptor and painter Matías Maestro. Maestro travelled to Peru by the end of the 18th century to start a new business. In 1793, he became a Catholic Priest and since then he dedicated himself to “renewing” the churches and altarpieces with the latest fashion style: Neoclassical. He became General Director of Lima's Charity Society in 1826 and died on January 7, 1835.

The cemetery was executed with care, within the guidelines of the new style: symmetry, irradiation of the new barracks, chapels, parks, avenues laid out in an orderly and clear manner. An octagonal chapel was designed for this cemetery, later demolished. Its interior was decorated with murals by José del Pozo, a Sevillian painter who arrived with the Malaspina expedition who settled in Lima and became a close collaborator of Maestro.

In the early hours of Sunday, November 4, 1917, José Carlos Mariátegui together with other people, among them the dancer Norka Rouskaya, caused a scandal, since Rouskaya danced half-naked on the main avenue between candles and violins in the Funeral March of Frédéric Chopin.

On August 17, 1923, it was given its current name.

== Construction ==
In this place there are many works by the Spanish Damià Campeny and the French Louis-Ernest Barrias, Émile Robert and Antonin Mercié (the latter two worked in the Crypt of Heroes). Also included are the works of the Italians Ulderico Tenderini, Giovanni Battista Cevasco, Pietro Costa and Rinaldo Rinaldi, all well-known in the artistic world of their time. Likewise, it is possible to appreciate works by prominent Peruvian sculptors of the mid-20th century, such as the funeral monument to Luis Miguel Sánchez Cerro, by Romano Espinoza; the bronze sculptures of the mausoleum of Óscar R. Benavides, by Luis Agurto; the mausoleum of Eloy G. Ureta, by Artemio Ocaña; the angel of the funeral monument to Francisco Graña, by Aldo Rossi; and the Pastor Fry mausoleum, by Eduardo Gastelú. The sculpture of the cenotaph of Alfonso Ugarte is the work of the Spanish sculptor Josep Campeny i Santamaria.

Among the works of art that are part of the cemetery are El Ángel de la Guarda (1947) by the sculptor Isabel Benavides Barreda.

== Cripta de los Héroes ==
Crypt of Heroes
- Cripta de los Héroes
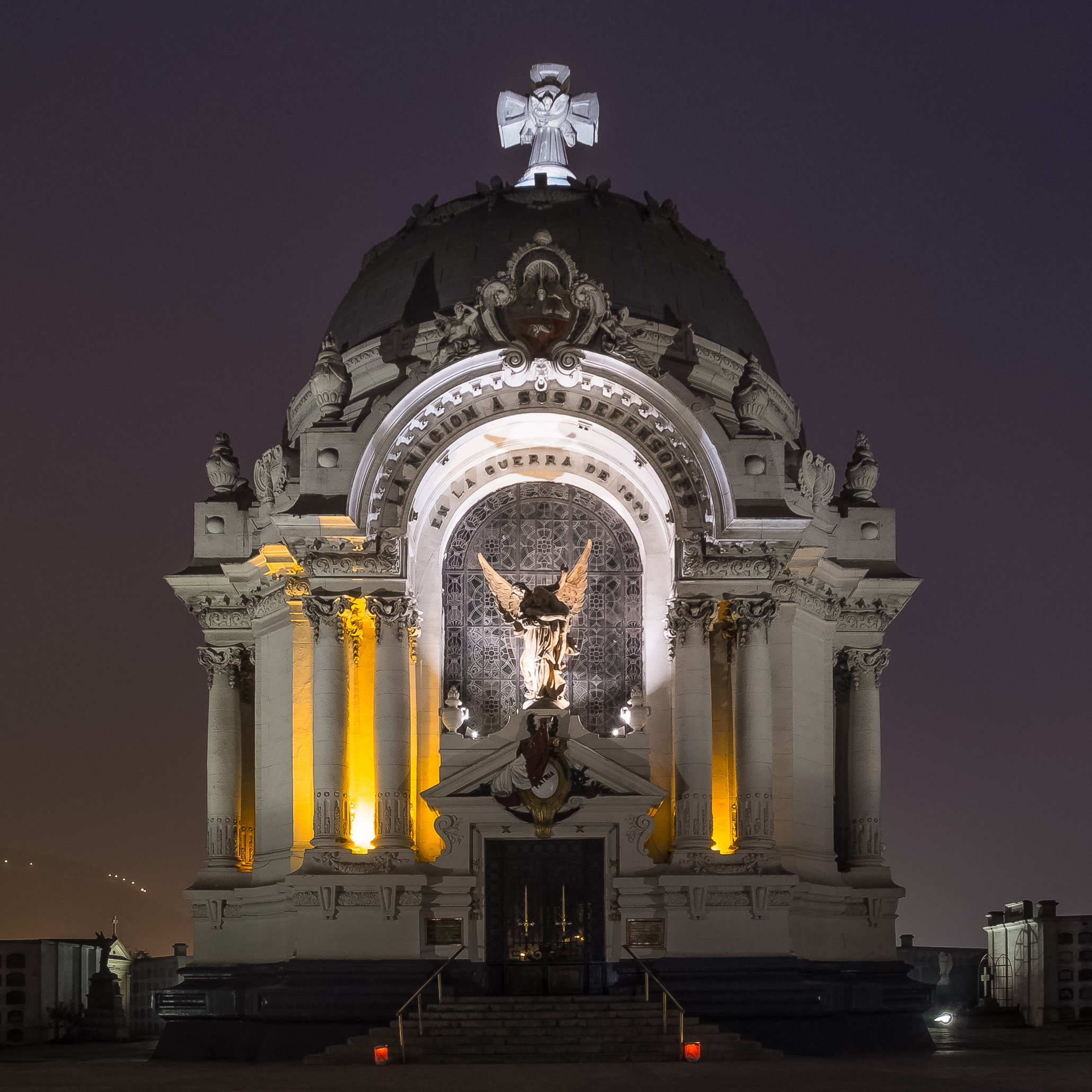
- The mausoleum at night
- Interactive map of Crypt of Heroes
- Designer: Emile Robert
- Type: Mausoleum
- Material: Stone, marble
- Opening date: September 8, 1908
- Restored date: 2002
- Dedicated to: War of the Pacific

The Crypt of Heroes (Spanish: Cripta de los Héroes) is the cemetery's largest monument, built to commemorate those fallen during the War of the Pacific. The mausoleum's entrance reads "La Nación a sus Defensores en la Guerra de 1879" (Meaning "The Nation, to its Defenders in the War of 1879").

=== History ===
It was created by Law on December 3, 1906 and inaugurated on September 8, 1908 during the government of José Pardo y Barreda. The budget was stipulated at Lp. 8,000. The work was executed in stone and marble by the architect Emile Robert with a marked eclectic style and crowned with a marble reproduction of the Gloria Victis, the work of the sculptor Antonin Mercié.

By Supreme Decree No. 13-GM of October 1, 1953, it was decided to integrate it under the custody of the Center for Historical Military Studies of Peru, as a Patriotic Sanctuary. On July 25, 1986, the monument was expanded to bury the remains of more combatants, adding a second basement.

In 2002 restoration work was carried out to return it to its original appearance.

=== Description ===
The Crypt of Heroes is a circular mausoleum over 30 metres high, with three levels, one main and two basements. It has a large dome that crowns it, and is surrounded by ornaments and neoclassical columns. Inside it is covered in marble with black veining; stained glass windows were also added.

In total, it contains 295 identified remains, 29 of them in sarcophagi and 265 in niches, as well as 2,065 wall plaques with names of combatants or unidentified victims.

==== Main floor ====
This level, which is the entrance to the mausoleum, is finely covered in marble. The sarcophagi of the greatest Peruvian heroes of the war are: Miguel Grau, who died in the battle of Angamos on October 8, 1879 aboard the Huáscar armour-clad monitor, and Colonel Francisco Bolognesi, defender of Arica, who fell in battle on June 7, 1880. In addition, marble plaques with the names of people who supported or participated in the conflict have been installed on the walls.

==== First basement ====
In the first basement, which is accessed by a side staircase, remains were buried in 234 niches scattered around the entire contour. In the central part appears the sarcophagus of Mariscal Andrés Avelino Cáceres. There are also five ossuaries which contain remains of anonymous combatants who died during the naval battles in Angamos, Iquique, Antofagasta and Callao, and those found on the battlefields of Tarapacá, Tacna and Arica, San Juan and Chorrillos, Miraflores, Huamachuco and San Pablo.

==== Second basement ====
On the last level there are 29 sarcophagi, 16 plaques and 40 white marble niches that contrast with the black marble on the floor and walls. Here lie Alfonso Ugarte and other heroes of the War of the Pacific, as well as the remains of Luis Alberto García Rojas, buried in 2019.

== Notable burials ==
=== Heads of state ===
- José de la Riva Agüero (mausoleum)
- José de La Mar (mausoleum)
- Agustín Gamarra (mausoleum)
- Antonio Gutiérrez de la Fuente
- Andrés Reyes y Buitrón
- Manuel Salazar y Baquíjano (mausoleum)
- Pedro Pablo Bermúdez
- Felipe Santiago Salaverry (mausoleum)
- Juan Crisóstomo Torrico (mausoleum)
- Domingo Elías
- Juan Antonio Pezet
- Justo Figuerola
- Manuel Menéndez
- Juan Manuel del Mar
- José María Raygada y Gallo
- Manuel Ignacio de Vivanco
- José Rufino Echenique
- José Balta y Montero
- Miguel de San Román (mausoleum)
- Manuel Pardo y Lavalle (mausoleum)
- Mariano Ignacio Prado (mausoleum)
- Nicolás de Piérola (mausoleum)
- Lizardo Montero (Crypt of Heroes)
- Miguel Iglesias (Crypt of Heroes)
- Remigio Morales Bermúdez (Crypt of Heroes)
- Justiniano Borgoño (Crypt of Heroes)
- Andrés Avelino Cáceres (Crypt of Heroes)
- Manuel Candamo (mausoleum)
- José Pardo y Barreda
- Guillermo Billinghurst (mausoleum)
- Augusto B. Leguía (mausoleum)
- Luis Miguel Sánchez Cerro (mausoleum)
- Óscar R. Benavides (mausoleum)
- Manuel Prado Ugarteche (mausoleum)
- Ricardo Pérez Godoy

=== Politicians ===
- Antonia Moreno Leyva (first lady)
- Victoria Tristán (first lady)
- Vicente Rocafuerte
- Francisco Escudero
- Edgardo Seoane
- Victor Larco Herrera
- Eugenio Larrabure y Unanue
- Anita Fernandini de Naranjo
- Genaro Castro Iglesias
- Pío de Tristán
- Javier Diez Canseco
- Luis A. Flores
- José Gálvez Egúsquiza

=== Academics ===
- José de la Riva-Agüero y Osma
- Mariano Felipe Paz Soldán
- Antonio Raimondi (mausoleum)
- Daniel Alcides Carrión
- Cayetano Heredia
- Javier Pérez de Cuéllar

=== Military ===
- Alfonso Ugarte (mausoleum)
- Eloy G. Ureta (mausoleum)
- Alfredo Rodríguez Ballón
- Clemens von Althaus
- Manuel Bonilla Elhart
- Leonor Ordóñez

=== Artists and sportsmen ===
- Felipe Pardo y Aliaga (writer)
- Manuel Ascencio Segura (writer)
- Manuel González Prada (writer)
- Ricardo Palma (writer)
- Ricardo Rossel (writer)
- Abraham Valdelomar (writer)
- José Carlos Mariátegui (writer)
- José Santos Chocano (writer)
- María Wiesse (writer)
- Ciro Alegría (writer)
- José María Eguren (writer)
- César Moro (writer)
- Francisco Laso (painter)
- José Sabogal (painter)
- Víctor Humareda (painter)
- Felipe Pinglo Alva (composer)
- Carlos Hayre (composer)
- Rosa Merino (singer)
- Micaela Villegas (singer)
- Alejandro Villanueva (sportsman)

=== Architects, engineers and businessmen ===
- Matías Maestro
- Edward Jan Habich
- Ernest Malinowski
- Henry Meiggs
- Michele Trefogli
- Manuel Piqueras Cotolí
- Francisco Graña Garland
- Rollin Thorne Sologuren
- Eulogio Fernandini
- Genaro Barragán Urrutia
- Roberto Letts

== In popular culture ==
For several years at the time of All Saints' Day, the play Don Juan Tenorio by José Zorrilla, a classic of literature written in Spanish, has been represented in the Cemetery.

== Gallery ==
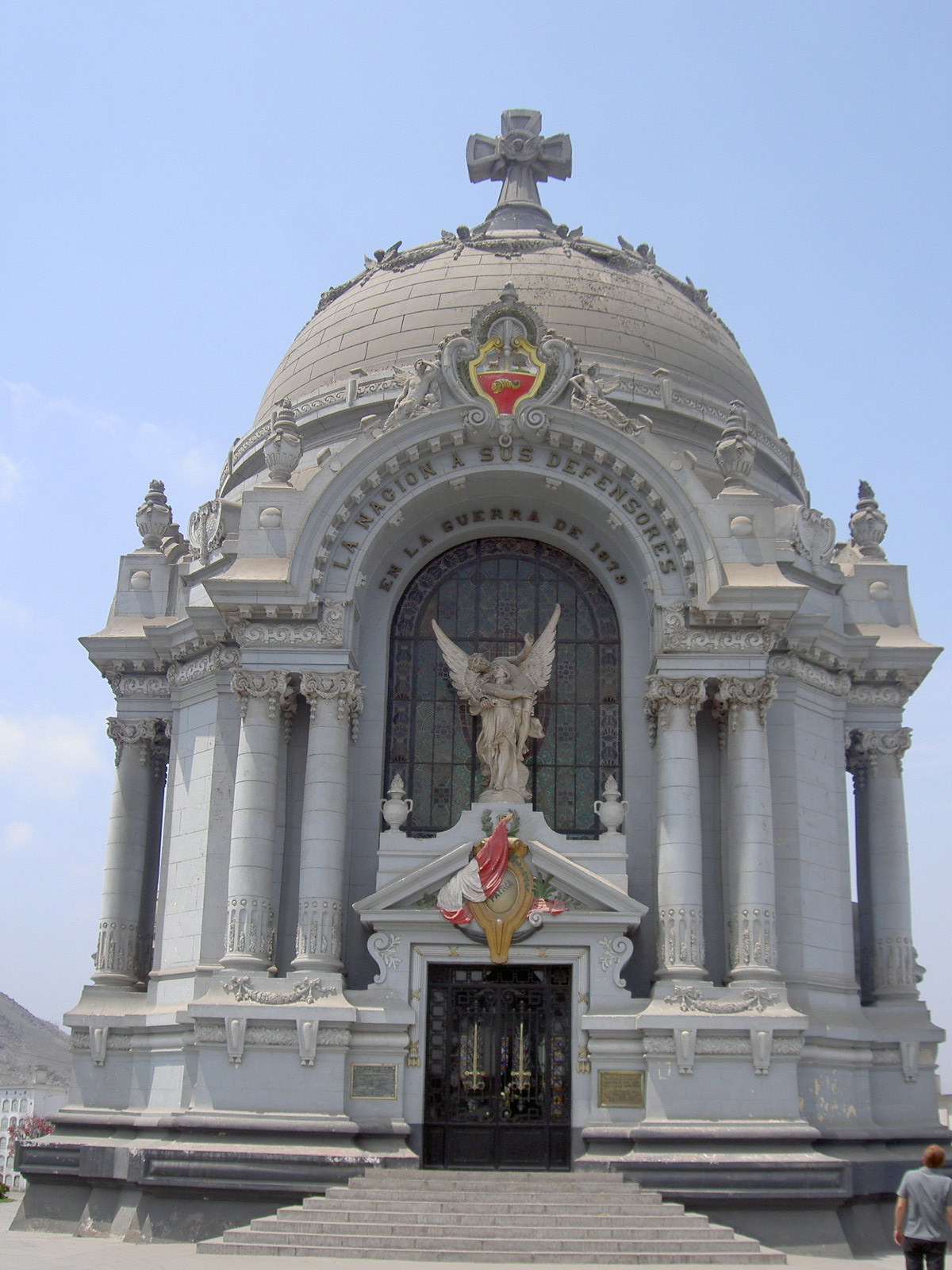
El Panteón de los Próceres

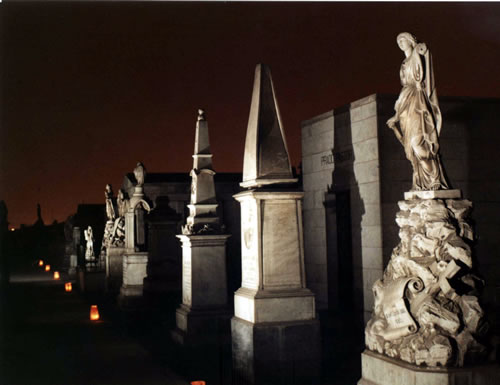
The cemetery at night

== See also ==
- Church of the Holy Christ of Wonders
- El Ángel Cemetery
- Nueva Esperanza Cemetery
