= Prime Minister of Peru =

Head of cabinet in Peru

- Presidente del Consejo de Ministros
- Great Seal of the State

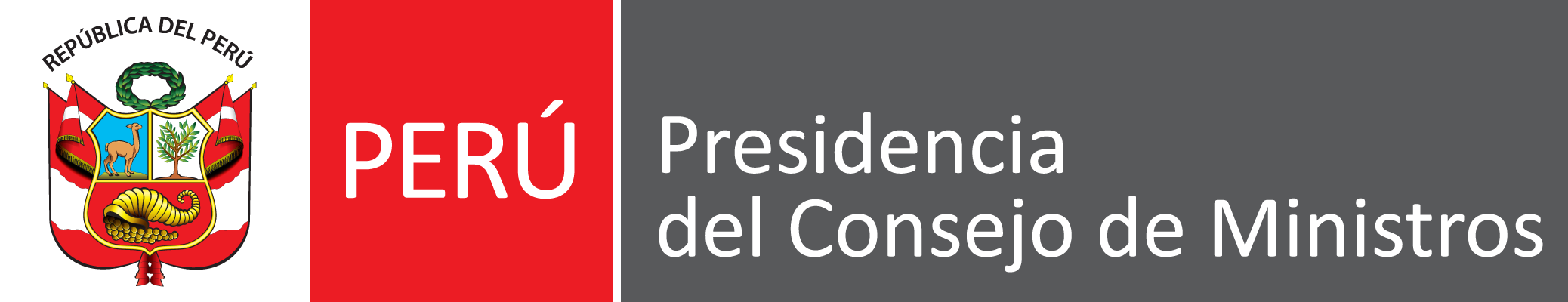
- Ministerial Logo

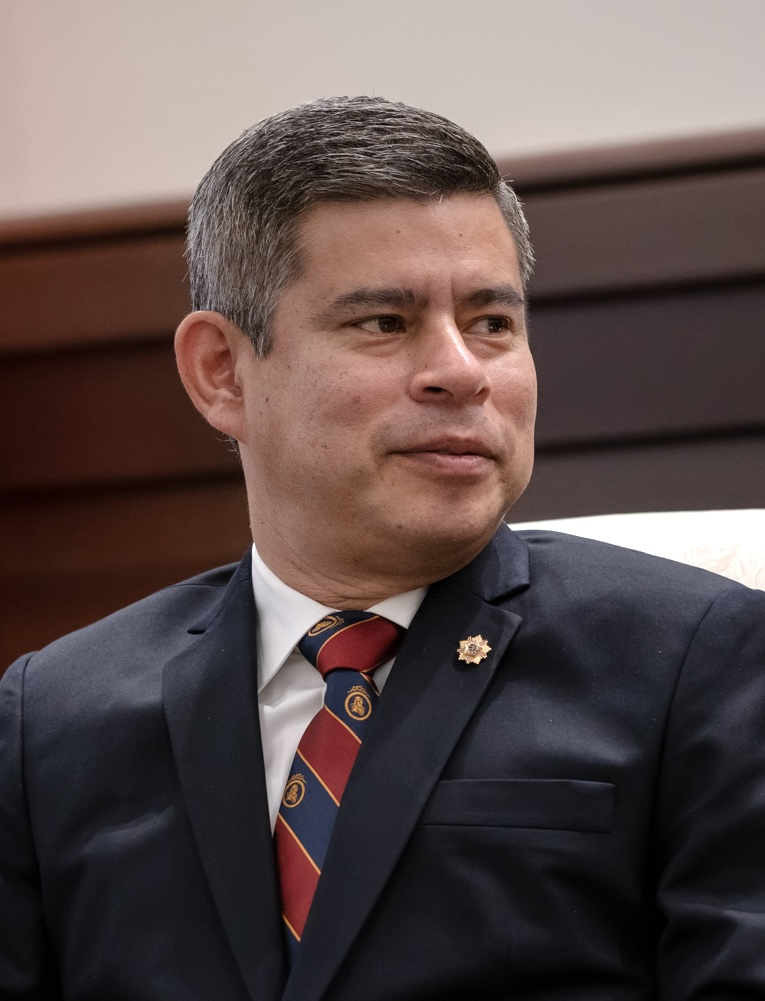
- Incumbent; Luis Galarreta since 28 July 2026
- Cabinet of Peru
- Style: His/Her Excellency
- Status: Deputy head of government
- Appointer: President of Peru
- Inaugural holder: Juan Manuel del Mar
- Formation: December 1856
- Salary: S/. 30,000 (monthly)
- Website: gob.pe/pcm

The prime minister of Peru (Spanish: primer ministro del Perú), officially the president of the Council of Ministers (Spanish: Presidente del Consejo de Ministros), serves as head of the cabinet and as the most senior member of the Council of Ministers, being appointed by the president of Peru (pending ratification by Congress, as with all other cabinet members). The person heads the presidency of the Council of Ministers (Spanish: Presidencia del Consejo de Ministros, PCM) of Peru, the governmental organisation that oversees the Council of Ministers and coordinates and monitors the multisectoral policies and programmes of the executive branch, as well as coordinates actions with the legislative branch, the autonomous constitutional bodies, and the entities and commissions of the executive branch, aligning priorities to ensure compliance with objectives of national interest.

The prime minister is not the executive head of government, since the president of Peru serves both as head of state and head of government, similar to the prime minister of South Korea. Peru is one of the few countries in Latin America (others include Cuba, and Haiti) where the position of prime minister currently exists. For alternative reasons, Peru is sometimes nonetheless considered a semi-presidential republic where the head of government (the President) is accountable to the Congress.

== History ==
The office was created in 1856, when the Council of Ministers was itself created through that year's constitution. Under the governments of Mariano Ignacio Prado (1865–1867) and Nicolás de Piérola (1879–1881), the ministries took the names of secretariats, and the head of state directly oversaw the functions attributed to the president of the Council of Ministers.

Luis Galarreta serves as the incumbent prime minister since 28 July 2026.

== Organisation ==
- Senior Management
  - President of the Council of Ministers
  - General Secretariat of the Presidency of the Council of Ministers
- Institutional Control Body
- Judicial Defense Body
- Advisory Bodies
  - General Office of Legal Counsel
  - General Office of Planning and Budget
- Support Bodies
  - General Office of Administration
  - General Office of Social Communication
- Line Bodies
  - Coordination Secretariat
  - Public Management Secretariat
  - Decentralization Secretariat
- Specialized Technical Bodies
  - National Technical Directorate of Territorial Demarcation
  - National Office of Electronic Government and Information Technology
- Vice Ministry of Territorial Governance
  - Decentralisation Secretariat
  - Social Management and Secretariat Dialogue
  - Secretariat of Demarcation and Territorial Organization
- Permanent Coordination Committees
- Attached Committees and Collegiate Bodies

Entities administered by the ministry include:

- National Civil Service Authority (SERVIR)
- National Infrastructure Authority (ANIN)
- National Centre for Strategic Planning (CEPLAN)
- National Commission for Development and Life without Drugs (DEVIDA)
- National Council for Science, Technology, and Technological Innovation (CONCYTEC)
- National Intelligence Directorate (DINI)
- National Institute for the Defense of Competition and the Protection of Intellectual Property (INDECOPI)
- National Institute of Statistics and Informatics (INEI)
- Forest Resources Oversight Agency (OSINFOR)
- Private Investment Supervisory Agency in Telecommunications (OSIPTEL)
- Energy and Mining Investment Supervisory Agency (OSINERGMIN)
- Public Transportation Infrastructure Investment Supervisory Agency (OSITRAN)
- National Superintendency of Services and Sanitation (SUNASS)
- Secretariat FONAVI Technical Support for the Ad Hoc Commission (FONAVI-ST)
- High-Level Anti-Corruption Commission (CAN)
- Commission Responsible for Proposing Administrative and Management Reform Actions and Measures for the Reorganisation of the Presidential Office (CRDP)
- National Coca Company (ENACO S.A)
- Citizen Service Centres (MAC)

== List of prime ministers ==
No.	Picture	Prime Minister	Took office	Left office	President
1		Juan Manuel del Mar Bernedo	December 1856	1857	Ramón Castilla
2		José María Raygada y Gallo (1st time)	1857	15 July 1858	Ramón Castilla
3		Miguel de San Román	15 July 1858	October 1858	Ramón Castilla
2		José María Raygada y Gallo (2nd time)	October 1858	1861	Ramón Castilla
4		Juan Antonio Pezet	1861	1863	Ramón Castilla
4		Juan Antonio Pezet	1861	1863	Miguel de San Román
4		Juan Antonio Pezet	1861	1863	Ramón Castilla
4		Juan Antonio Pezet	1861	1863	Pedro Diez Canseco
5		Juan Antonio Ribeyro Estrada	1863	August 1864	Juan Antonio Pezet
6		Manuel Costas Arce	August 1864	11 April 1865	Juan Antonio Pezet
7		Manuel Ignacio de Vivanco	11 April 1865	September 1865	Juan Antonio Pezet
7		Manuel Ignacio de Vivanco	11 April 1865	September 1865	Mariano Ignacio Prado
7		Manuel Ignacio de Vivanco	11 April 1865	September 1865	Juan Antonio Pezet
8		Pedro José Calderón	September 1865	8 November 1865	Juan Antonio Pezet
9		Mariano Ignacio Prado	8 November 1865	June 1867	Pedro Diez Canseco
9		Mariano Ignacio Prado	8 November 1865	June 1867	Mariano Ignacio Prado
10		Pedro José de Saavedra	June 1867	January 1868	Mariano Ignacio Prado
11		Luis La Puerta	January 1868	8 January 1868	Mariano Ignacio Prado
12		Antonio Arenas (1st time)	8 January 1868	2 August 1868	Pedro Diez Canseco
13		José Balta	2 August 1868	2 August 1871	José Balta
14		José Allende	2 August 1871	1872	José Balta
15		José Jorge Loayza (1st time)	1872	1872	Francisco Diez Canseco
15		José Jorge Loayza (1st time)	1872	1872	Mariano Herencia Zevallos
16		José Miguel Medina	2 August 1872	3 September 1873	Manuel Pardo
17		José Eusebio Sánchez Pedraza	3 September 1873	1874	Manuel Pardo
18		José de la Riva-Agüero y Looz Corswarem	1874	1875	Manuel Pardo
19		Nicolás Freire González	1875	1876	Manuel Pardo
12		Antonio Arenas (2nd time)	2 August 1876	26 August 1876	Mariano Ignacio Prado
20		Teodoro La Rosa	26 August 1876	4 June 1877	Mariano Ignacio Prado
21		Juan Buendía Noriega	4 June 1877	18 June 1878	Mariano Ignacio Prado
15		José Jorge Loayza (2nd time)	18 June 1878	17 December 1878	Mariano Ignacio Prado
22		Manuel Irigoyen Larrea (1st time)	17 December 1878	19 May 1879	Mariano Ignacio Prado
23		Manuel de Mendiburu	19 May 1879	16 October 1879	Mariano Ignacio Prado
24		Manuel Gonzáles de la Cotera	16 October 1879	23 December 1879	Mariano Ignacio Prado
25		Aurelio Denegri Valega (1st time)	March 1881	November 1881	Francisco García Calderón
26		Lorenzo Iglesias Pino de Arce	3 January 1883	27 August 1883	Lizardo Montero Flores
27		Manuel Antonio Barinaga (1st time)	27 August 1883	7 April 1884	Lizardo Montero Flores
27		Manuel Antonio Barinaga (1st time)	27 August 1883	7 April 1884	Andrés Avelino Cáceres
28		Mariano Castro Zaldívar Iglesias	7 April 1884	14 May 1885	Andrés Avelino Cáceres
29		Joaquín Iglesias Pino de Arce	14 May 1885	3 December 1885	Andrés Avelino Cáceres
12		Antonio Arenas (3rd time)	3 December 1885	5 June 1886	Himself
30		Pedro Alejandrino del Solar Gabans (1st time)	5 June 1886	6 October 1886	Andrés Avelino Cáceres
31		José Nicolas Araníbar y Llano	6 October 1886	22 November 1886	Andrés Avelino Cáceres
30		Pedro Alejandrino del Solar Gabans (2nd time)	22 November 1886	22 August 1887	Andrés Avelino Cáceres
32		Mariano Santos Álvarez Villegas	22 August 1887	12 September 1887	Andrés Avelino Cáceres
33		Carlos Maria Elías y de la Quintana (1st time)	12 September 1887	5 October 1887	Andrés Avelino Cáceres
—		Raymundo Morales Arias; Acting Prime Minister	5 October 1887	8 November 1887	Andrés Avelino Cáceres
25		Aurelio Denegri Valega (2nd time)	8 November 1887	8 March 1889	Andrés Avelino Cáceres
34		José Mariano Jiménez Wald (1st time)	8 March 1889	4 April 1889	Andrés Avelino Cáceres
30		Pedro Alejandrino del Solar Gabans (3rd time)	4 April 1889	10 February 1890	Andrés Avelino Cáceres
22		Manuel Irigoyen Larrea (2nd time)	11 February 1890	10 August 1890	Andrés Avelino Cáceres
35		Augusto Huaman-Velasco Billinghurst	10 August 1890	24 July 1891	Remigio Morales Bermúdez
—		Alberto Elmore Fernández de Córdoba; Acting Prime Minister	24 July 1891	14 August 1891	Remigio Morales Bermúdez
36		Federico Herrera (1st time)	1 August 1891	24 August 1891	Remigio Morales Bermúdez
37		Justiniano Borgoño	24 August 1891	14 October 1891	Remigio Morales Bermúdez
—		Federico Herrera (2nd time)	14 October 1891	27 November 1891 (acting)	Remigio Morales Bermúdez
36		Federico Herrera (2nd time)	27 November 1891	14 April 1892	Remigio Morales Bermúdez
—		Juan Ibarra	14 April 1892	2 May 1892 (acting)	Remigio Morales Bermúdez
38		Juan Ibarra	2 May 1892	30 June 1892	Remigio Morales Bermúdez
33		Carlos Maria Elías y de la Quintana (2nd time)	30 June 1892	3 March 1893	Remigio Morales Bermúdez
39		Manuel Velarde Seoane	3 March 1893	11 May 1893	Remigio Morales Bermúdez
34		José Mariano Jiménez Wald (2nd time)	11 May 1893	1 April 1894	Remigio Morales Bermúdez
40		Baltasar García Urrutia	1 April 1894	10 August 1894	Justiniano Borgoño
41		Cesáreo Chacaltana Reyes (1st time)	10 August 1894	16 November 1894	Andrés Avelino Cáceres
22		Manuel Irigoyen Larrea (3rd time)	16 November 1894	20 March 1895	Andrés Avelino Cáceres
42		Antonio Bentín y La Fuente	8 September 1895	30 November 1895	Nicolás de Piérola
27		Manuel Antonio Barinaga (2nd time)	30 November 1895	8 August 1896	Nicolás de Piérola
43		Manuel Pablo Olaechea Guerrero	8 August 1896	25 November 1897	Nicolás de Piérola
44		Alejandro López de Romaña Alvizuri	25 November 1897	16 May 1898	Nicolás de Piérola
15		José Jorge Loayza (3rd time)	16 May 1898	8 September 1899	Nicolás de Piérola
45		Manuel María Gálvez Egúsquiza	8 September 1899	14 December 1899	Eduardo López de Romaña
46		Enrique de la Riva-Agüero y Looz Corswaren (1st time)	14 December 1899	30 August 1900	Eduardo López de Romaña
47		Enrique Coronel Zegarra Castro	30 August 1900	2 October 1900	Eduardo López de Romaña
48		Domingo M. Almenara Butler	2 October 1900	11 September 1901	Eduardo López de Romaña
41		Cesáreo Chacaltana Reyes (2nd time)	11 September 1901	9 August 1902	Eduardo López de Romaña
49		Cesáreo Octavio Deustua Escarza	9 August 1902	4 November 1902	Eduardo López de Romaña
50		Eugenio Larrabure y Unanue	4 November 1902	8 September 1903	Eduardo López de Romaña
51		José Pardo y Barreda	8 September 1903	14 May 1904	Manuel Candamo
51		José Pardo y Barreda	8 September 1903	14 May 1904	Serapio Calderón
52		Alberto Elmore Fernández de Córdoba	14 May 1904	24 September 1904	Serapio Calderón
53		Augusto Bernardino Leguía y Salcedo	24 September 1904	1 August 1907	José Pardo y Barreda
54		Agustín Tovar	1 August 1907	9 October 1907	José Pardo y Barreda
55		Carlos A. Washburn Salas	9 October 1907	24 September 1908	José Pardo y Barreda
56		Eulogio I. Romero Salcedo	24 September 1908	8 June 1909	Augusto B. Leguía y Salcedo
57		Rafael Fernández de Villanueva Cortez	8 June 1909	14 March 1910	Augusto B. Leguía y Salcedo
58		Javier Prado y Ugarteche	14 March 1910	3 August 1910	Augusto B. Leguía y Salcedo
59		Germán Schreiber Waddington (1st time)	3 August 1910	3 November 1910	Augusto B. Leguía y Salcedo
60		José Salvador Cavero Ovalle	3 November 1910	27 December 1910	Augusto B. Leguía y Salcedo
61		Enrique C. Basadre Stevenson	27 December 1910	31 August 1911	Augusto B. Leguía y Salcedo
62		Agustín Guillermo Ganoza Cavero	31 August 1911	24 September 1912	Augusto B. Leguía y Salcedo
63		Elías Malpartida	24 September 1912	23 December 1912	Guillermo Billinghurst
64		Enrique Varela Vidaurre (1st time)	24 December 1912	24 February 1913	Guillermo Billinghurst
65		Federico Luna y Peralta	24 February 1913	17 June 1913	Guillermo Billinghurst
66		Aurelio Sousa Matute (1st time)	17 June 1913	27 July 1913	Guillermo Billinghurst
64		Enrique Varela Vidaurre (2nd time)	27 July 1913	4 February 1914	Guillermo Billinghurst
67		Pedro E. Muñiz Sevilla	16 May 1914	1 August 1914	Óscar Benavides
68		Manuel Melitón Carvajal	1 August 1914	2 August 1914	Óscar Benavides
66		Aurelio Sousa Matute (2nd time)	22 August 1914	11 November 1914	Óscar Benavides
59		Germán Schreiber Waddington (2nd time)	11 November 1914	18 February 1915	Óscar Benavides
69		Carlos Isaac Abril Galindo	18 February 1915	24 September 1915	José Pardo y Barreda
64		Enrique de la Riva-Agüero y Looz Corswaren (2nd time)	24 September 1915	27 July 1917	José Pardo y Barreda
70		Francisco Tudela y Varela	27 July 1917	18 December 1918	José Pardo y Barreda
71		Germán Arenas y Loayza (1st time)	18 December 1918	26 April 1919	José Pardo y Barreda
72		Juan Manuel Zuloaga	26 April 1919	4 July 1919	José Pardo y Barreda
73		Germán Leguía y Martínez Jakeway	4 July 1919	7 October 1922	Augusto B. Leguía y Salcedo
74		Julio Enrique Ego Aguirre	7 October 1922	12 October 1924	Augusto B. Leguía y Salcedo
75		Alejandrino Maguiña	12 October 1924	7 December 1926	Augusto B. Leguía y Salcedo
76		Pedro José Rada y Gamio	7 December 1926	12 October 1929	Augusto B. Leguía y Salcedo
77		Benjamín Huamán de los Heros	12 October 1929	23 August 1930	Augusto B. Leguía y Salcedo
78		Fernando Sarmiento	23 August 1930	25 August 1930	Augusto B. Leguía y Salcedo
79		Luis Miguel Sánchez Cerro	25 August 1930	24 November 1930	Manuel María Ponce Brousset
79		Luis Miguel Sánchez Cerro	25 August 1930	24 November 1930	Luis Miguel Sánchez Cerro
80		Antonio Beingolea	24 November 1930	1 March 1931	Luis Miguel Sánchez Cerro
71		Germán Arenas y Loayza (2nd time)	8 December 1931	28 January 1932	Luis Miguel Sánchez Cerro
81		Francisco R. Lanatta Ramírez	29 January 1932	13 April 1932	Luis Miguel Sánchez Cerro
82		Luis A. Flores	13 April 1932	20 May 1932	Luis Miguel Sánchez Cerro
83		Ricardo Rivadeneyra Barnuevo (1872–1954)	21 May 1932	24 December 1932	Luis Miguel Sánchez Cerro
84		José Matías Manzanilla Barrientos (1867–1947)	24 December 1932	29 June 1933	Luis Miguel Sánchez Cerro
84		José Matías Manzanilla Barrientos (1867–1947)	24 December 1932	29 June 1933	Óscar Benavides
85		Jorge Prado y Ugarteche (1887–1970)	29 June 1933	24 November 1933	Óscar Benavides
86		José de la Riva-Agüero y Osma (1885–1944)	24 November 1933	18 May 1934	Óscar Benavides
87		Alberto Rey de Castro y Romaña (1st time) (1869–1961)	September 1934	24 December 1934	Óscar Benavides
88		Carlos Arenas y Loayza (1885–1955)	24 December 1934	May 1935	Óscar Benavides
89		Manuel Esteban Rodríguez (1883–1952)	21 May 1935	13 April 1936	Óscar Benavides
90		Ernesto Montagne Markholz (1885–1954)	8 December 1936	12 April 1939	Óscar Benavides
87		Alberto Rey de Castro y Romaña (2nd time) (1869–1961)	12 April 1939	8 December 1939	Óscar Benavides
91		Alfredo Solf y Muro (1872–1969)	8 December 1939	3 December 1944	Manuel Prado y Ugarteche
92		Manuel Cisneros Sánchez (1st time) (1904–1971)	3 December 1944	28 July 1945	Manuel Prado y Ugarteche
93		Rafael Belaúnde Diez Canseco (1886–1972)	28 July 1945	31 January 1946	José Bustamante y Rivero
94		Julio Ernesto Portugal Escobedo (1894–1972)	31 January 1946	12 January 1947	José Bustamante y Rivero
95		José R. Alzamora Freundt (1891–1953)	12 January 1947	30 October 1947	José Bustamante y Rivero
96		Roque Augusto Saldías Maninat (1st time) (1892–1974)	27 February 1948	17 June 1948	José Bustamante y Rivero
97		Armando Revoredo Iglesias (1896–1978)	17 June 1948	29 October 1948	José Bustamante y Rivero
98		Zenón Noriega Agüero (1900–1957)	28 July 1950	9 August 1954	Manuel A. Odría
96		Roque Augusto Saldías Maninat (2nd time) (1892–1974)	9 August 1954	28 July 1956	Manuel A. Odría
92		Manuel Cisneros Sánchez (2nd time) (1904–1971)	28 July 1956	9 June 1958	Manuel Prado y Ugarteche
99		Luis Gallo Porras (1894–1972)	9 June 1958	18 July 1959	Manuel Prado y Ugarteche
100		Pedro Beltrán Espantoso (1897–1979)	18 July 1959	24 November 1961	Manuel Prado y Ugarteche
101		Carlos Moreyra y Paz Soldán (1898–1981)	24 November 1961	18 July 1962	Manuel Prado y Ugarteche
102		Nicolás Lindley López (1908–1995)	18 July 1962	3 March 1963	Ricardo Pérez Godoy
102		Nicolás Lindley López (1908–1995)	3 March 1963	28 July 1963	Nicolás Lindley López
103		Óscar Trelles Montes (1904–1990)	28 July 1963	31 December 1963	Fernando Belaúnde Terry
104		Fernando Schwalb (1st time) (1916–2002)	31 December 1963	15 September 1965	Fernando Belaúnde Terry
105		Daniel Becerra de la Flor (1906–1987)	15 September 1965	6 September 1967	Fernando Belaúnde Terry
106		Edgardo Seoane Corrales (1903–1978)	6 September 1967	17 November 1967	Fernando Belaúnde Terry
107		Raúl Ferrero Rebagliati (1911–1977)	17 November 1967	30 May 1968	Fernando Belaúnde Terry
108		Oswaldo Hercelles García (1908–1969)	30 May 1968	2 October 1968	Fernando Belaúnde Terry
109		Miguel Mujica Gallo (1910–2001)	2 October 1968	3 October 1968	Fernando Belaúnde Terry
110		Ernesto Montagne Sánchez (1916–1993)	3 October 1968	31 January 1973	Juan Velasco Alvarado
111		Luis Edgardo Mercado Jarrín (1919–2012)	31 January 1973	1 February 1975	Juan Velasco Alvarado
112		Francisco Morales Bermúdez (1921–2022)	1 February 1975	30 August 1975	Juan Velasco Alvarado
113		Óscar Vargas Prieto (1917–1989)	30 August 1975	31 January 1976	Francisco Morales Bermúdez
114		Jorge Fernández Maldonado Solari (1922–2000)	31 January 1976	16 July 1976	Francisco Morales Bermúdez
115		Guillermo Arbulú Galliani (1921–1998)	17 July 1976	30 January 1978	Francisco Morales Bermúdez
116		Óscar Molina Pallochia (1921–1990)	30 January 1978	31 January 1979	Francisco Morales Bermúdez
117		Pedro Richter Prada (1921–2017)	31 January 1979	28 July 1980	Francisco Morales Bermúdez
118		Manuel Ulloa Elías (1922–1992)	28 July 1980	3 January 1983	Fernando Belaúnde Terry
104		Fernando Schwalb (2nd time) (1916–2002)	3 January 1983	10 April 1984	Fernando Belaúnde Terry
119		Sandro Mariátegui Chiappe (1921–2013)	12 October 1984	28 July 1985	Fernando Belaúnde Terry
120		Luis Ciro Pércovich Roca (1931–2017)	12 October 1984	28 July 1985	Fernando Belaúnde Terry
121		Luis Juan Alva Castro (born 1942)	28 July 1985	26 June 1987	Alan García Pérez
122		Guillermo Larco Cox (1st time) (1932–2002)	26 June 1987	17 May 1988	Alan García Pérez
123		Armando Villanueva del Campo (1915–2013)	17 May 1988	15 May 1989	Alan García Pérez
124		Luis Alberto Felix Sánchez (1900–1994)	15 May 1989	30 September 1989	Alan García Pérez
122		Guillermo Larco Cox (2nd time) (1932–2002)	30 September 1989	28 July 1990	Alan García Pérez
125		Juan Carlos Hurtado Miller (born 1940)	28 July 1990	15 February 1991	Alberto Fujimori
126		Carlos Torres y Torres Lara (1942–2000)	15 February 1991	6 November 1991	Alberto Fujimori
127		Alfonso de los Heros Pérez-Albela (born 1939)	6 November 1991	6 April 1992	Alberto Fujimori
128		Óscar de la Puente Raygada (born 1938)	6 April 1992	28 August 1993	Alberto Fujimori
129		Alfonso Bustamante y Bustamante (born 1941)	28 August 1993	17 February 1994	Alberto Fujimori
130		Efraín Goldenberg Schreiber (1929–2025)	17 February 1994	28 July 1995	Alberto Fujimori
131		Dante Córdova Blanco (born 1943)	28 July 1995	3 April 1996	Alberto Fujimori
132		Alberto Pandolfi Arbulú (1st time) (born 1940)	3 April 1996	4 June 1998	Alberto Fujimori
133		Javier Valle Riestra González Olachea (1932–2024)	4 June 1998	21 August 1998	Alberto Fujimori
132		Alberto Pandolfi Arbulú (2nd time) (born 1940)	21 August 1998	3 January 1999	Alberto Fujimori
134		Víctor Dionicio Joy Way Rojas (born 1945)	3 January 1999	10 October 1999	Alberto Fujimori
135		José Alberto Bustamante Belaúnde (1950–2008)	10 October 1999	29 July 2000	Alberto Fujimori
136		Federico Salas Guevara Schultz (1950–2021)	29 July 2000	22 November 2000	Alberto Fujimori
137		Javier Pérez de Cuéllar (1920–2020)	22 November 2000	28 July 2001	Valentín Paniagua
138		Roberto Enrique Dañino Zapata (born 1951)	28 July 2001	12 July 2002	Alejandro Toledo
139		Luis Solari De La Fuente (born 1948)	12 July 2002	28 June 2003	Alejandro Toledo
140		Martha Beatriz Merino Lucero (born 1947)	28 June 2003	15 December 2003	Alejandro Toledo
141		Carlos Ferrero Costa (1941–2025)	15 December 2003	16 August 2005	Alejandro Toledo
142		Pedro Pablo Kuczynski Godard (born 1938)	16 August 2005	28 July 2006	Alejandro Toledo
143		Jorge del Castillo Gálvez (born 1950)	28 July 2006	14 October 2008	Alan García Pérez
144		Yehude Simon Munaro (born 1947)	14 October 2008	11 July 2009	Alan García Pérez
145		Javier Velásquez (born 1960)	11 July 2009	14 September 2010	Alan García Pérez
146		José Antonio Chang (born 1958)	14 September 2010	18 March 2011	Alan García Pérez
147		Rosario Fernández (born 1955)	19 March 2011	28 July 2011	Alan García Pérez
148		Salomón Lerner Ghitis (born 1946)	28 July 2011	10 December 2011	Ollanta Humala
149		Oscar Valdés (born 1949)	11 December 2011	23 July 2012	Ollanta Humala
150		Juan Jiménez Mayor (born 1964)	23 July 2012	31 October 2013	Ollanta Humala
151		César Villanueva (1st time) (born 1946)	31 October 2013	24 February 2014	Ollanta Humala
152		René Cornejo (born 1962)	24 February 2014	22 July 2014	Ollanta Humala
153		Ana Jara (born 1968)	22 July 2014	2 April 2015	Ollanta Humala
154		Pedro Cateriano (1st time) (born 1958)	2 April 2015	28 July 2016	Ollanta Humala
155		Fernando Zavala Lombardi (born 1971)	28 July 2016	17 September 2017	Pedro Pablo Kuczynski
156		Mercedes Aráoz Fernández (born 1961)	17 September 2017	2 April 2018	Pedro Pablo Kuczynski
151		César Villanueva (2nd time) (born 1946)	2 April 2018	8 March 2019	Martín Vizcarra
157		Salvador del Solar (born 1970)	11 March 2019	30 September 2019	Martín Vizcarra
158		Vicente Zeballos (born 1963)	30 September 2019	15 July 2020	Martín Vizcarra
154		Pedro Cateriano (2nd time) (born 1958)	15 July 2020	6 August 2020	Martín Vizcarra
159		Walter Martos (1957–2025)	6 August 2020	9 November 2020	Martín Vizcarra
160		Ántero Flores Aráoz (born 1942)	11 November 2020	17 November 2020	Manuel Merino
161		Violeta Bermúdez (born 1961)	18 November 2020	28 July 2021	Francisco Sagasti
162		Guido Bellido (born 1979)	29 July 2021	6 October 2021	Pedro Castillo
163		Mirtha Vásquez (born 1975)	6 October 2021	31 January 2022	Pedro Castillo
164		Héctor Valer (born 1959)	1 February 2022	8 February 2022	Pedro Castillo
165		Aníbal Torres (born 1942)	8 February 2022	24 November 2022	Pedro Castillo
166		Betssy Chávez (born 1989)	25 November 2022	7 December 2022	Pedro Castillo
167		Pedro Angulo Arana (born 1960)	10 December 2022	21 December 2022	Dina Boluarte
168		Alberto Otárola (born 1967)	21 December 2022	5 March 2024	Dina Boluarte
169		Gustavo Adrianzén (born 1966)	6 March 2024	13 May 2025	Dina Boluarte
170		Eduardo Arana Ysa (born 1965)	14 May 2025	12 October 2025	Dina Boluarte
171		Ernesto Álvarez Miranda (born 1961)	14 October 2025	23 February 2026	José Jerí
172		Denisse Miralles (born 1976)	24 February 2026	17 March 2026	José María Balcázar
173		Luis Arroyo Sánchez (born 1956)	17 March 2026	28 July 2026	José María Balcázar
174		Luis Galarreta born 1971)	28 July 2026	Incumbent	Keiko Fujimori
