= Remigio Morales Bermúdez =

President of Peru from 1890 to 1894

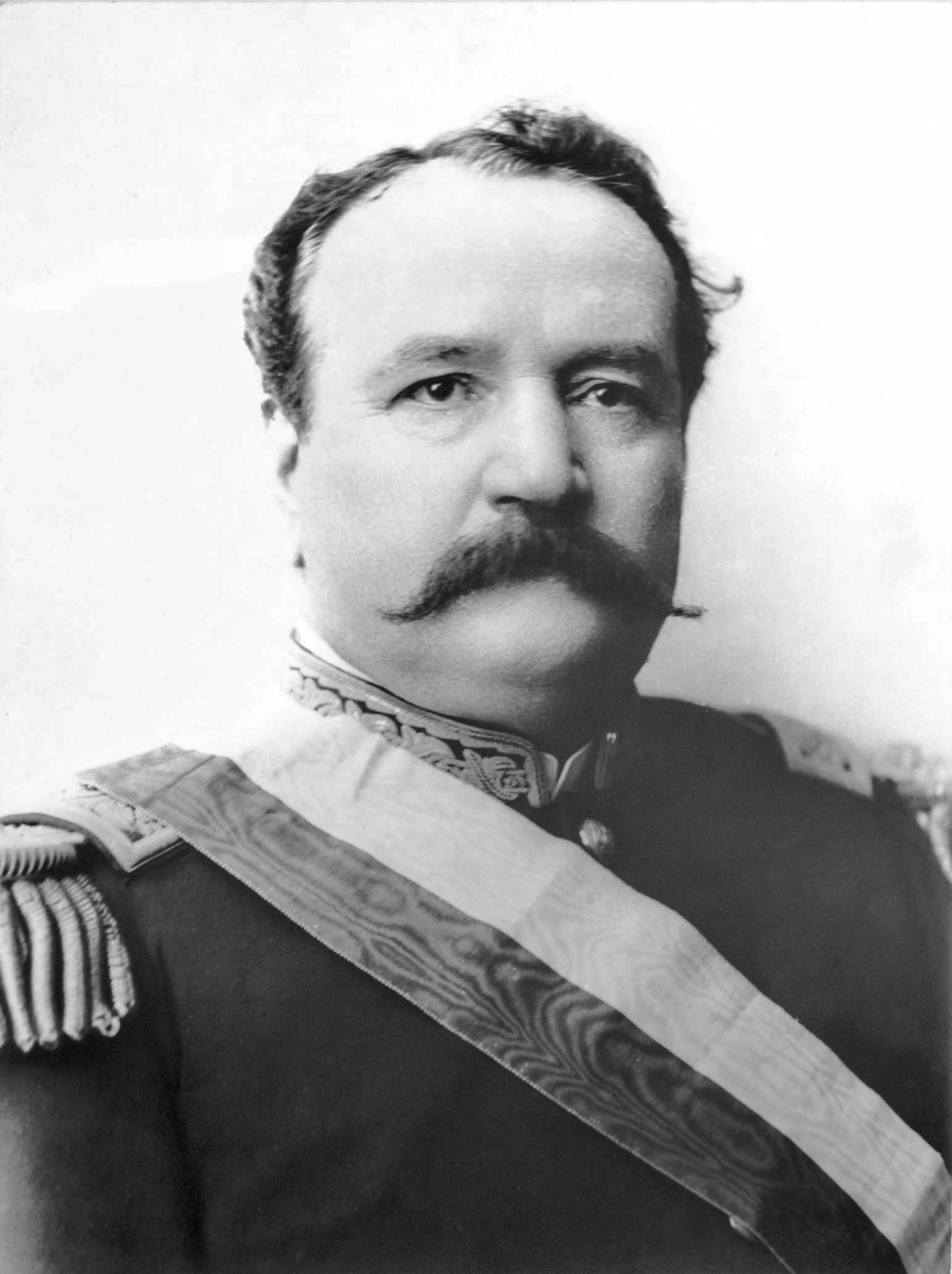

28th President of Peru
- In office 10 August 1890 – 1 April 1894
- Prime Minister: Augusto Huaman-Velasco Billinghurst; Alberto Elmore Fernández de Córdoba (acting); Federico Herrera; Justiniano Borgoño; Juan Ibarra; Carlos Maria Elías y de la Quintana; Manuel Velarde Seoane; José Mariano Jiménez Wald
- Vice President: Pedro Alejandrino del Solar; Justiniano Borgoño
- Preceded by: Andrés Avelino Cáceres
- Succeeded by: Justiniano Borgoño

Personal details
- Born: 30 September 1836 San Andrés de Pica, Peru
- Died: 1 April 1894 (aged 57) Lima, Peru
- Party: Constitutional Party
- Relatives: Francisco Morales Bermúdez (grandson)

Remigio Morales Bermúdez (30 September 1836 – 1 April 1894) served as the President of Peru from 1890 to 1894. He died while still in office. He served as the first vice president from 1886 to 1890.

His future grandson, whom he would never live to meet, Francisco Morales-Bermúdez, served as president of Peru from 1975 to 1980.

Political offices
Preceded by Andrés Avelino Cáceres	President of Peru; 1890–1894	Succeeded by Justiniano Borgoño
