= Enrique Varela Vidaurre =

Peruvian soldier and politician (1857–1914)

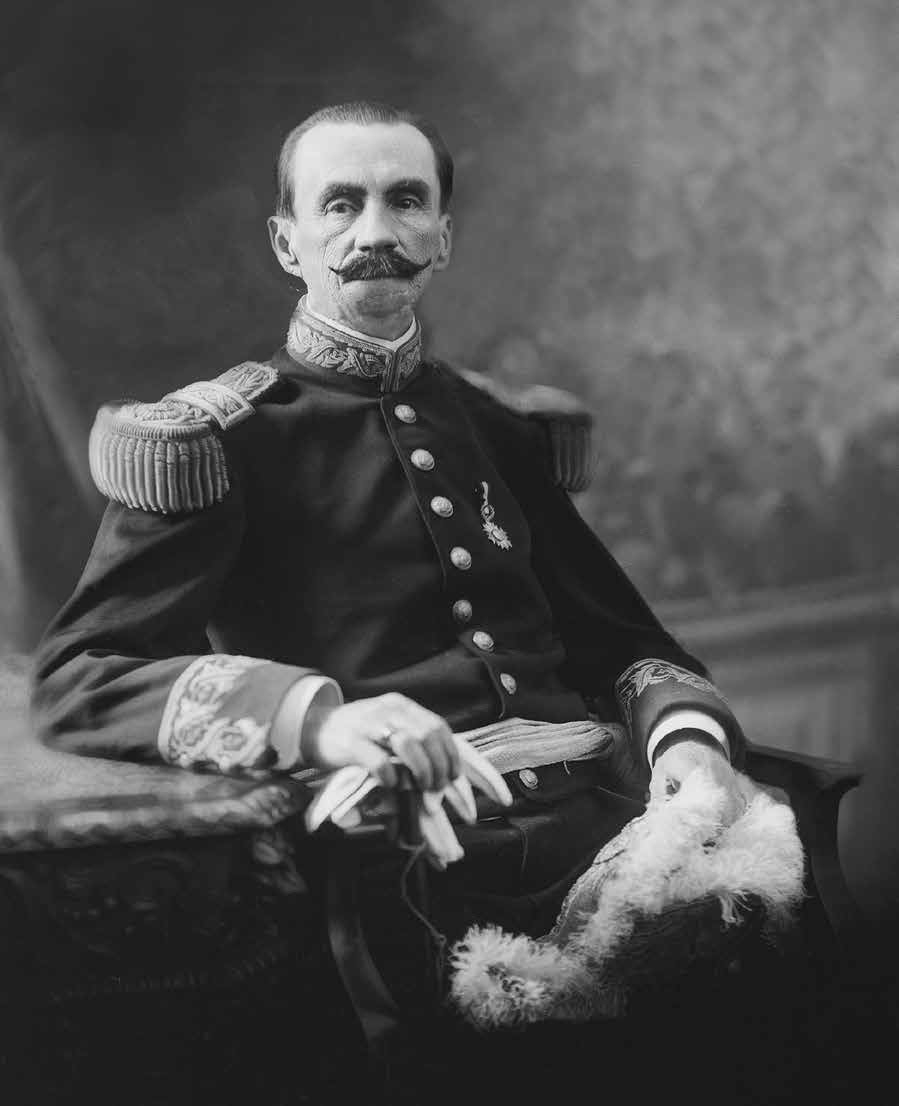

Enrique Varela Vidaurre (August 30, 1857 – February 4, 1914) was a Peruvian soldier and politician. He was born in Lima, Peru. A veteran of the War of the Pacific, he fought at the Battle of San Francisco and the Battle of Tarapaca. He was wounded in action and taken captive as a prisoner of war in Chile. After his release in 1884, he supported Andrés Avelino Cáceres against Miguel Iglesias in an internal conflict that had broken out following Peru's defeat. He was made a colonel in 1903 and brigadier general in 1910. He commanded Peruvian forces during a border dispute with Ecuador. He was twice Prime Minister of Peru (December 1912 – February 1913, July 1913 – February 1914). He was simultaneously minister of war and navy in the Government of Peru. His cabinet included future prime minister Francisco Tudela y Varela as foreign minister. He was assassinated during a coup by Óscar Benavides against the presidency of Guillermo Billinghurst.

Preceded by Juan Manuel de la Torre	Minister of War and Navy of Peru; September 24, 1912 – February 24, 1913	Succeeded by Carlos A. Velarde
Preceded by Elías Malpartida	Prime Minister of Peru; December 24, 1912 – February 24, 1913	Succeeded by Federico Luna y Peralta
Preceded by Aurelio Sousa Matute	Prime Minister of Peru; July 27, 1913 – February 4, 1914	Succeeded by Pedro E. Muñiz Sevilla
Preceded by Melitón Carvajal	Minister of War and Navy of Peru; July 27, 1913 – February 4, 1914	Succeeded by Pedro E. Muñiz
