= Civic Union =

Civic Union may refer to:

- Civic Union (Argentina)
- Civic Union (Latvia)
- Civic Union (Russia)
- Civic Union (Uruguay)
- Civic Union Party, a political party in Peru
