= Joaquín Iglesias Pino de Arce =

Peruvian military man and politician

José Joaquín Iglesias Pino de Arce
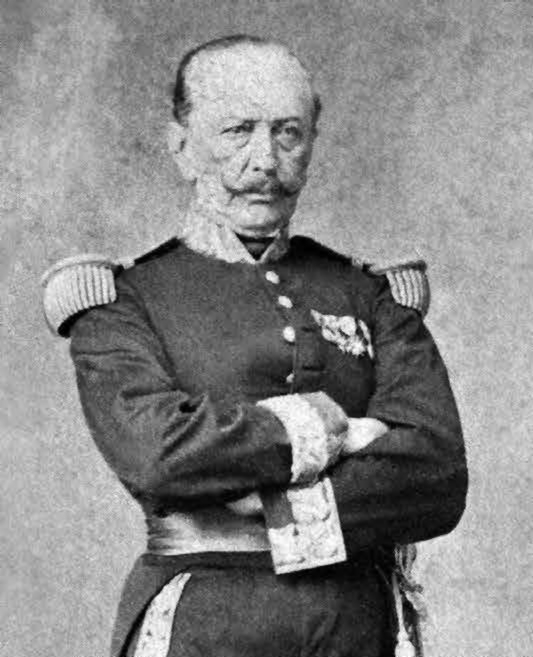
- Born: 1822; Cajamarca, Perú
- Died: 1888 (aged 65–66); Lima, Perú
- Occupations: Soldier and politician
- Predecessor: Mariano Castro Zaldívar
- Successor: Antonio Arenas
- Spouse: Adela Castañeda Seminario
- Parents: Lorenzo Iglesias Espinach (father); Rosa Pino de Arce (mother)
- Relatives: Ernestina Iglesias Castañeda (Sister); Miguel Iglesias (Brother)

José Joaquín Iglesias Pino de Arce (1822 in Cajamarca – 1888 in Lima) was a Peruvian military man and politician. He was president of the Council of Ministers and was Minister of Government during the presidency of his brother General Miguel Iglesias (1885).

He was the son of Lorenzo Iglesias Espinach and Rosa Pino de Arce. He was the brother of Miguel Iglesias, who became president of Peru.

He supported his brother Miguel throughout his political career that began with the so-called Grito de Montán of August 31, 1882, in which he demanded that Peru sign peace with Chile, even with territorial transfers.

Miguel Iglesias surrounded himself with his immediate relatives to organize his government. Thus, his brothers Joaquín and Lorenzo Iglesias, his nephew-in-law Vidal García y García, and his brother-in-law Mariano Castro Zaldívar were at his side. The Iglesias government was first installed in Cajamarca, where he called a General Assembly, while the rest of the country demonstrated its rejection of him.

After the cabinets chaired by Manuel Antonio Barinaga and Mariano Castro Zaldívar, the one chaired by Joaquín Iglesias was installed, which was the last of the Miguel Iglesias government. Joaquín assumed the Government portfolio, the rest of the ministers being the following: Baltasar García Urrutia (Foreign Relations); Monsignor Manuel Tovar y Chamorro (Justice); Manuel Galup (Treasury); and Juan Martín Echenique (War and Navy).

After his brother's government ended, Joaquín retired to private life. He died in Chorrillos, Lima, in 1888.

== Sources ==
- Basadre, Jorge (2005). Historia de la República del Perú. Vol. 9 (9 ed.). Lima: Empresa Editora El Comercio S. A. ISBN 9972-205-71-1.
- Basadre, Jorge (2005). Historia de la República del Perú. Vol. 10 (9 ed.). Lima: Empresa Editora El Comercio S. A. ISBN 9972-205-72-X.
- Gálvez Montero, José Francisco; García Vega, Enrique Silvestre (2016). Historia de la Presidencia del Consejo de Ministros (PDF) (1 ed.). Lima: Empresa Peruana de Servicios Editoriales S.A. ISBN 978-87-93429-87-1. Archived from the original (PDF) on 4 November 2020.
- Vargas Ugarte, Rubén (1984). Historia General del Perú. Vol. 10 (2 ed.). Lima: Editorial Milla Batres.
