= Justiniano Borgoño =

Peruvian brigadier general and politician (1836–1921)

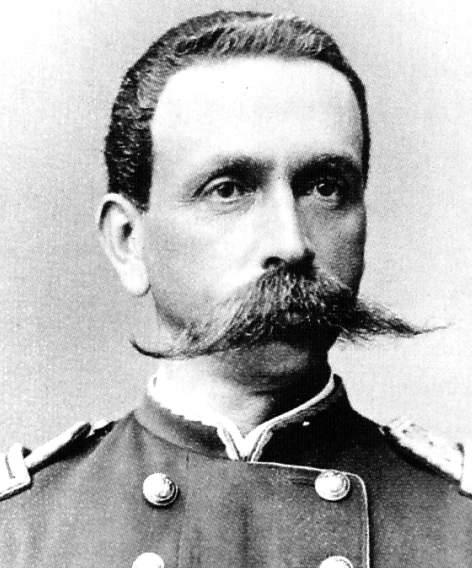
- Borgoño in 1885

29th President of Peru
- Preceded by: Remigio Morales Bermúdez
- Succeeded by: Andrés Avelino Cáceres

Second Vice President of Peru
- President: Remigio Morales Bermúdez
- Preceded by: Aurelio Denegri
- Succeeded by: Cesáreo Chacaltana Reyes

Personal details
- Born: 5 September 1836 Trujillo, North Peru
- Died: 27 January 1921 (aged 84) Lima, Peru
- Party: Constitutional Party

Military service
- Branch/service: Peruvian Army
- Years of service: 1856–1858, 1879–1886
- Rank: Brigadier general
- Battles/wars: Peruvian Civil War of 1856–1858; War of the Pacific; Peruvian Civil War of 1884–1885

Justiniano Borgoño Castañeda (5 September 1836 – 27 January 1921) was a Peruvian brigadier general and politician who served as the President of Peru, an office he held for four months in 1894. The son of a brigadier general in the Peruvian Army, Borgoño left behind agricultural administration to join the Army following the outbreak of the Peruvian Civil War of 1856–1858. He returned to military service nearly twenty years later to serve in the War of the Pacific, during which he survived a leg wound and being taken as a prisoner of war for three months.

During the War of the Pacific, Borgoño declared loyalty to General Andrés Avelino Cáceres, who later appointed him as his Minister of War and Navy. He went on to become President Remigio Morales Bermúdez's Second Vice President. As a result of military intervention, as well as the influence of Cáceres, Borgoño supplanted the First Vice President, Pedro Alejandrino del Solar, and became the President of Peru in April 1894. Borgoño quickly called for general elections, allowing Cáceres' reelection in August of that year. After his presidency, Borgoño retired to Ancón, Lima, where he died in 1921.

== Early life ==
Borgoño was born on 5 September 1836 in Trujillo, Peru. His father, Pedro Antonio Borgoño, was born in Petorca, Chile; he was a veteran of the Peruvian War of Independence and reached the rank of brigadier general in the Peruvian Army. His mother, Manuela Castañeda y Madalengoitia, was a native of Trujillo. He had a sister named Enriqueta Borgoño de Abril.

Borgoño began his education at the Colegio Seminario San Carlos y San Marcelo, a school in Trujillo, in 1847. Five years later, he finished his schooling there and took over the administration of his family's plantation in the Chicama Valley. He was only sixteen when his father put him in charge of the plantation, which was called "Tulape". He would remain at Tulape for four years, where he was described as an uncommonly hard worker. He was married to Jesús Salas de la Torre Urraca.

== Military career ==
In 1856, at the age of twenty, Borgoño left Tulape and joined the Peruvian Army as a lieutenant. He had been motivated to do so by his father's lengthy and accomplished service. He quickly became involved in combat; that same year, the Peruvian Civil War of 1856–1858 had broken out across the country. Fighting on the side of the previously established government against the forces of Manuel Ignacio de Vivanco, Borgoño took part in the capture of the ports of Islay and Iquique in December 1856 and of the port of Arica in 1858. As a result of his service, he was promoted to captain. After the rebellion was defeated, Borgoño returned to Tulape and leased the property from his parents, which he administrated for twenty years.

After the War of the Pacific broke out in 1879, Borgoño returned to military service; he organized the Libres de Trujillo battalion less than two weeks after the beginning of the war. The battalion was assigned to safeguard La Punta to protect Peru from a possible landing by the invading Chilean Army, then transferred to the Morro Solar in Chorrillos. On 13 January 1881, during the Battle of San Juan and Chorrillos, Borgoño, who had reached the rank of colonel, injured his right leg and was taken prisoner. Three months later, his release was brokered by Chilean general Cornelio Saavedra Rodríguez, who was the friend of some of Borgoño's Chilean relatives. His wounds were treated by medic Enrique Arias Soto.

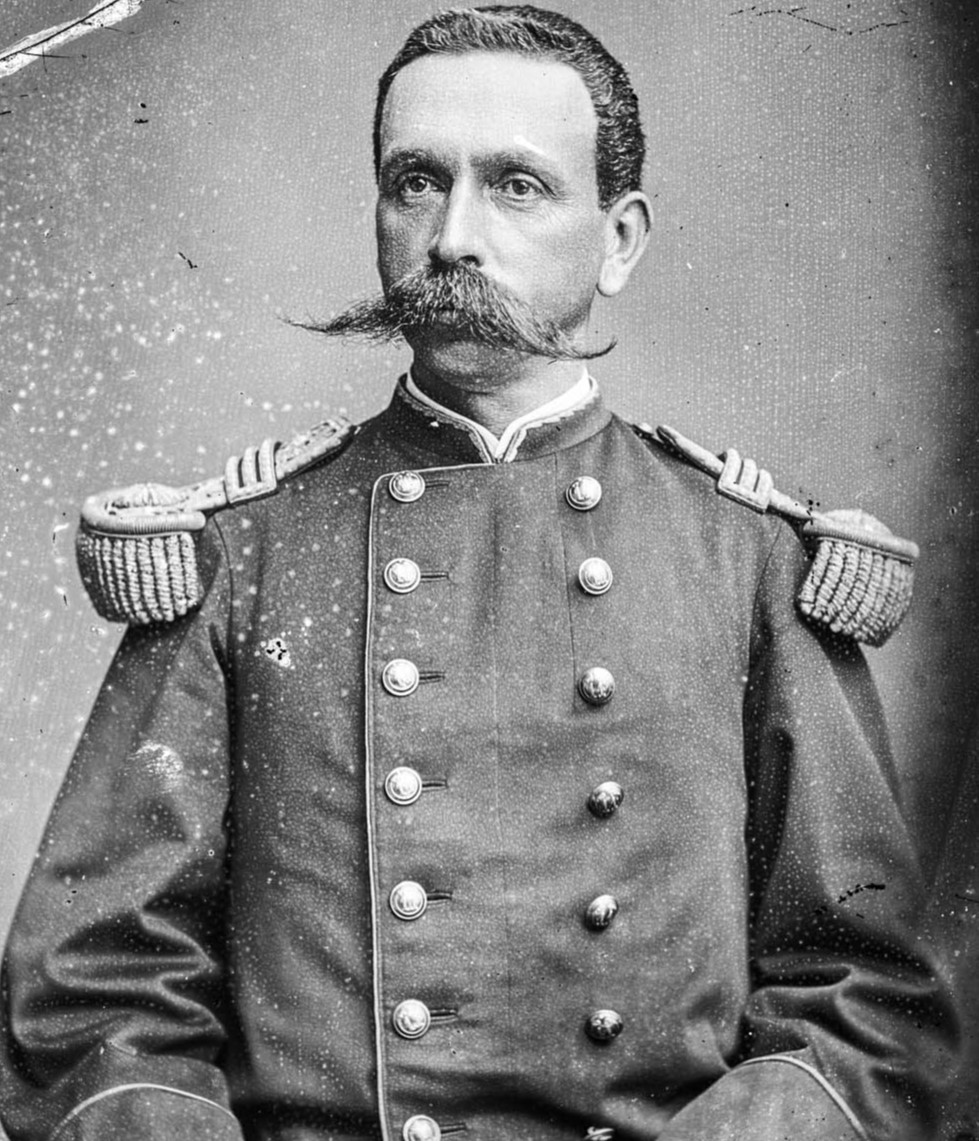
Borgoño in 1881

Although Borgoño had promised not to take up arms following his release, he was appointed General Commander of La Libertad in July 1881, a position he held until the following June. Under General Miguel Iglesias, Borgoño led a division which fought in San Pablo on 13 July 1882, leading to a Peruvian victory. Later, Iglesias and Andrés Avelino Cáceres entered into conflict due to Iglesias' calls for peace through the cessation of territory to Chile; despite Borgoño's previous service under Iglesias, he declared loyalty to Cáceres and relocated to Tarma, where he took control of the 2nd Zepita Battalion. In Tarma, he was again injured during the Battle of Huamachuco, the final major battle of the War of the Pacific.

Following Peru's defeat in the War of the Pacific in 1883, Borgoño remained loyal to Cáceres, who appointed Borgoño as General Commander of the forces of La Libtertad. Borgoño denounced Iglesias' presidency and supported Cáceres as the rightful president of Peru. In 1884, he was designated as the Commander in Chief of the Northern Army but declined the position. That year, he was also named the General Commander and Prefect of Arequipa and served as the interim Minister of War and Navy until February 1885.

Borgoño served under Cáceres in the Peruvian Civil War of 1884–1885, fought between the forces of Iglesias and Cáceres. From July 1885 to November 1885, as commander of the Army's 1st Division, Borgoño participated in battles and confrontations in Masma, Canta, Huaripampa, and Chicla, eventually leading to the capture of Lima in December of that year. Iglesias surrendered and was exiled, while Cáceres took the presidency in June 1886. Borgoño was tasked with disarming Iglesias' remaining forces in Cajamarca, La Libertad, and Lambayeque.

== Political career ==
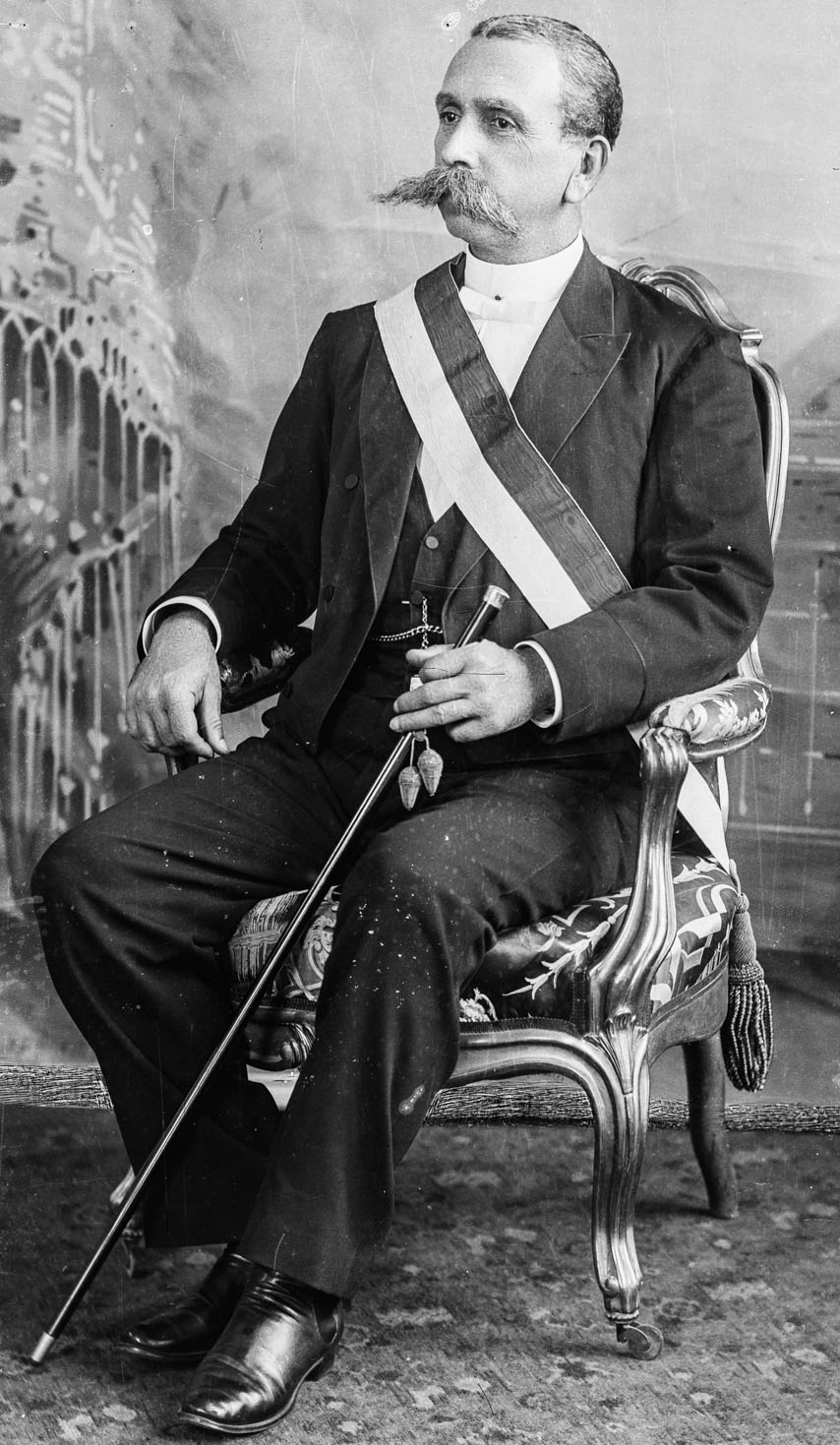
Borgoño in 1894

Following the Civil War, Borgoño was elected to represent his native province of Trujillo in Congress. His term began in 1886 and lasted until 1889. He was once again appointed Minister of War and Navy as soon as Cáceres took office as president on 4 June 1886; he held this position until the following year. In 1890, after holding multiple political offices, he was selected to be the Second Vice President of Peru, underneath the President, Remigio Morales Bermúdez, and the First Vice President, Pedro Alejandrino del Solar. Morales Bermúdez, like Borgoño, was loyal to Cáceres, who had personally selected Morales Bermúdez to serve as president. del Solar, on the other hand, was part of Cáceres' opposition and an ally of Nicolás de Piérola.

Prior the end of his first term as president, Morales Bermúdez contracted an illness and died suddenly on 1 April 1894. As First Vice President, del Solar was constitutionally indicated to become the next president. However, Second Vice President Borgoño leapt the established line of succession and became the 29th president of Peru the same day as Morales Bermúdez's death. Borgoño's ascent to president has alternatively been attributed to the influence of Cáceres, who sought to again become president, and to military intervention on Borgoño's behalf. After being supplanted, del Solar went into hiding in Arica.

Within the first week as his period as "caretaker president", Borgoño dissolved the Congress, claiming that it was illegitimate and did not represent Peruvian interests, and called for new general elections. He also persecuted members of the opposing Civilista Party on the orders of Cáceres. He rose to the rank of brigadier general during his presidency. Despite its brevity, Borgoño's administration oversaw multiple instances of corruption, including by Borgoño's Minister of Finance, Horacio Ferreccio. Borgoño's presidency is generally regarded as being a means for Cáceres to once again become president.

The elections called by Borgoño offered Cáceres as its only candidate after all other candidates resigned and he was declared President on 10 August 1894. The elections followed a period of suppression of opposition and political violence in Peruvian politics. A coalition opposing Cáceres formed, headed by Piérola, who had recently returned from his exile in Chile. After a series of revolts occurred throughout Peru in protest of Cáceres' presidency, Piérola led an armed attack on Lima on 16 March 1885, leading to a ceasefire and Cáceres' resignation. Piérola took office as president immediately after. After Piérola assumed the presidency, Borgoño left Peru and relocated to Argentina; there, he once again worked on agricultural ventures. In 1901, he returned to Peru and was appointed as the president of the Council of General Officers.

== Later life and death ==
Following his retirement from politics, Borgoño moved to Ancón, Lima. He resided there, completely uninvolved with politics, until his death on 27 January 1921, at the age of 84. He was buried at the San Juan de la Cruz barracks. A street in Miraflores, Lima, was renamed in his honor; Calle General Borgoño extends eleven blocks and is interrupted by the Huaca Pucllana. Additionally, a bust depicting him was erected in his hometown of Trujillo in 2013. It was later stolen from its pedestal.
