= Alberto Elmore Fernández de Córdoba =

Peruvian lawyer, diplomat and politician

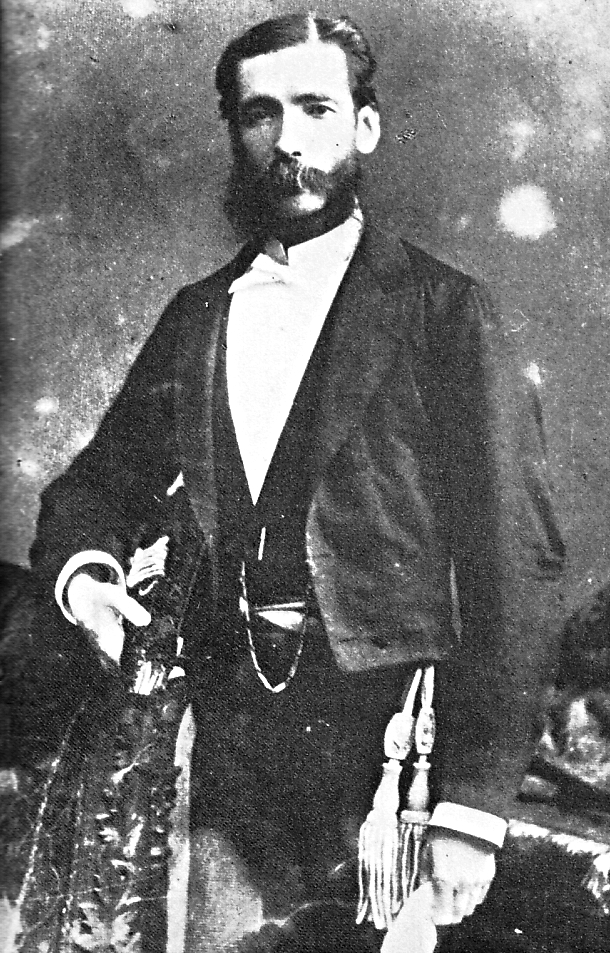

Alberto Elmore Fernández de Córdoba (August 28, 1844 – June 7, 1916) was a Peruvian lawyer, diplomat and politician. He was born in Lima, Peru. He was a member of the faculty of the National University of San Marcos. He was 3 times minister of foreign affairs (1887–1888, 1891, 1904) in the Government of Peru. He was Prime Minister of Peru (July – August 1891, May – September 1904).

| Preceded by Domingo de Vivero | Minister of Foreign Affairs of Peru; November 9, 1887 – April 26, 1888 | Succeeded by Isaac Alzamora |
| Preceded by Manuel Yrigoyen Arias | Minister of Foreign Affairs of Peru; August 10–14, 1891 | Succeeded by Juan Federico Elmore |
| Preceded by Augusto Huaman-Velasco Billinghurst | Prime Minister of Peru; July 24 – August 14, 1891 | Succeeded by Federico Herrera |
| Preceded by José Pardo y Barreda | Minister of Foreign Affairs of Peru; May 14 – September 25, 1904 | Succeeded by Solón Polo |
| Preceded by José Pardo y Barreda | Prime Minister of Peru; May 14 – September 24, 1904 | Succeeded by Augusto Bernardino Leguía y Salcedo |

== Works ==
- Legislación sobre privilegios industriales (1885)
- Tratado de Derecho Comercial (2 volúmenes, 1888–1899)
- Ensayo sobre la doctrina de la intervención internacional (1896), inicialmente leído en 1881.
- Reformas del Código de Justicia Militar (1905)
- Proyecto de codificación del Derecho Internacional Privado (1914)

== Bibliography ==
- Basadre Grohmann, Jorge: Historia de la República del Perú. 1822 - 1933, Octava Edición, corregida y aumentada. Tomos 9 y 10. Editada por el Diario "La República" de Lima y la Universidad "Ricardo Palma". Impreso en Santiago de Chile, 1998.
- Tauro del Pino, Alberto: Enciclopedia Ilustrada del Perú. Tercera Edición. Tomo 6, D’AC/FER. Lima, PEISA, 2001. ISBN 9972-40-155-3
