= Luis La Puerta =

Acting president of Peru in 1879

Luis La Puerta de Mendoza
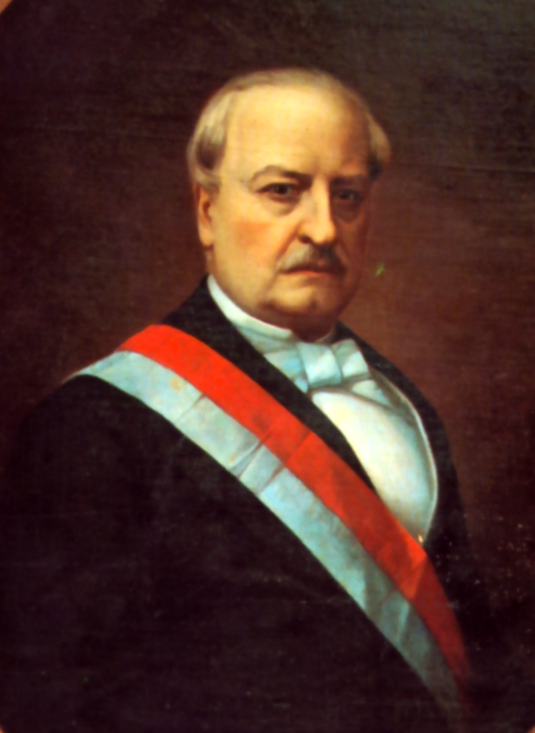

Acting President of Peru
- In office December 18, 1879 – December 23, 1879
- Preceded by: Mariano Ignacio Prado
- Succeeded by: Nicolás de Piérola

Personal details
- Born: August 25, 1811 Cusco, Peru
- Died: October 21, 1896 (aged 85) Lima, Peru
- Party: Independent
- Other political affiliations: Affiliated with the Liberals

Luis La Puerta de Mendoza (August 25, 1811 – October 21, 1896) was a 19th-century Peruvian politician. He was born in Cusco. He was briefly Prime Minister of Peru in January 1868. He served as the first vice president from 1876 to 1879 and briefly acted as president for five days in 1879 during the War of the Pacific while then-president Mariano Ignacio Prado was overseas.

Preceded by Pedro Jose de Saavedra	Prime Minister of Peru; January 1868	Succeeded by Antonio Arenas

== Bibliography ==
- Aparicio, Manuel J.: Cusco en la Guerra con Chile. Cuzco: INC, 2003
- Basadre, Jorge: Historia de la República del Perú. 1822 - 1933, Octava Edición, corregida y aumentada. Tomos 5, 6, 7 y 8. Editada por el Diario "La República" de Lima y la Universidad "Ricardo Palma". Impreso en Santiago de Chile, 1998.
- Fonseca, Juan: Un Estado en Formación (1827-1883). Tomo X de la “Historia del Perú” publicada por la Empresa Editora El Comercio S.A, 2010. ISBN 978-612-4069-96-3
- Orrego, Juan Luis: La República Oligárquica (1850-1950). Incluida en la Historia del Perú. Lima, Lexus Editores, 2000. ISBN 9972-625-35-4
- Tauro del Pino, Alberto: Enciclopedia Ilustrada del Perú. Tercera Edición. Tomo 9, JAB/LLO. Lima, PEISA, 2001. ISBN 9972-40-158-8
- Vargas Ugarte, Rubén: Historia General del Perú. Tomos IX y X. Primera Edición. Editor Carlos Milla Batres. Lima, Perú, 1971.
