= Ricardo Rossel =

Peruvian author (1841–1909)

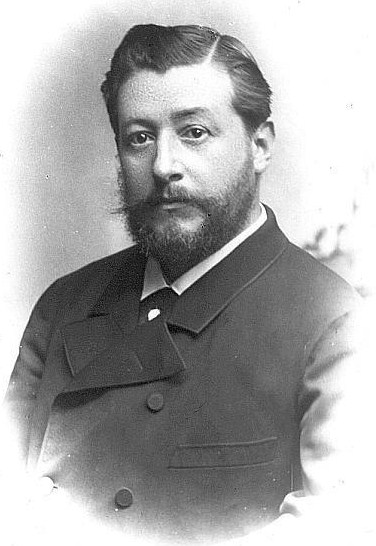
- Born: Ricardo Rossel Sirot; May 12, 1841; Lima, Province of Lima, Peru
- Died: December 6, 1909 (aged 68); Barranco, Lima, Peru
- Spouse: Matilde Dulanto Valcárcel

Ricardo Rossel Sirot (12 May 1841 – 6 December 1909) was a Peruvian author, poet, politician, scholar, and entrepreneur. He was the founder of the Club Literario de Lima.

== Biography ==
Ricardo Rossel was born in Lima to the French immigrant Eugenio Rossel, a man from the Nîmes region of Languedoc, who arrived in Peru in 1826 and established a French imports store in Lima, and Carmen Sirot, a woman from Lima. He had four siblings - Manuel Eugenio, Carlos Amador, Rosalia and Isidro.

Rossel studied at the Seminario de Santo Toribio, earning a gold medal in his final year of higher education. In the early years of his schooling, he showed a natural disposition and interest in literature. Reading became one of his favorite pastimes, and he read eagerly the classics of the epoch that helped shape his style and literary spirit. At the age of 13, he composed his first verses.

His father died in 1859, which compelled him to take charge of the family business. He also devoted himself to the agricultural industry until 1874 when he established a merchant store, which brought him even more recognition in the city of Callao. He also explored the mining industry, becoming manager and partner of a mining company in the Andes region.

Rossel married Matilde Dulanto Valcárcel, daughter of Manuel Cipriano Dulanto, a hero of the independence war and beloved resident of the city of Callao, and María de los Santos Valcárcel. They had five children: Ricardo Marcos, Carlos Amador, Eugene, Jose Alberto and Maria.

He held municipal positions in the local government of Callao, and served on various boards and commissions officers for commercial and economic affairs, and was also appointed president of the commercial court of the same city. Rossel was also elected diputado (congressman) for Lima during the government of president Remigio Morales Bermúdez, where he received fame as a speaker. Then in 1895 President Nicolás de Pierola entrusted him with the organization and management of the office responsible for administering the tax on salt.

Rossel was a man mostly dedicated to commerce and industry, but with a special passion for poetry and writing, which compelled him, in his few spare moments, to create works and compositions of different kinds: literary discourses, translations, reports, press articles, novels, stories, and poetry. For this reason, perhaps, he did not create an extensive collection of works.

He was the founder and a member of the Club Literario de Lima, and was elected President of its section of literature from 1875 to 1881, then reappointed in 1885 for the same office until 1886, when the Club Literario became the Ateneo de Lima, and was elected its vice president for several years. He was a member of the Real Academia Española since 1886.

He did an analysis of the works of Manuel Bretón de los Herreros, which earned him praise from the press of Latin America and Spain. In 1877, he won the International Literary Contest held in Chile, with his legend "Catalina Tupac Roca" receiving a gold medal. For this reason, the government of Peru awarded him a second gold medal and another one from the Literary Club. Some of his works that also deserve special mention, are the legends "La Huerfana de Ate” (the Orphan of Ate) and "La Roca de la viuda” (The Widow‘s rock), "El Salto del Fraile” (the Jump of the Monk) which he dedicated to Ricardo Palma and the academic speech that inaugurated the works of the Section of Literature and Fine Arts of El Ateneo de Lima in January 1886.

His fluency in French, which he learned with his father since he was a child, allowed him to translate into Spanish French poetry, which was appreciated in his time, from authors like Alphonse de Lamartine, Alfred de Musset, and Victor Hugo, and were published in different media.

During the War of the Pacific, he organized a public fund raising in Callao to buy a naval ship and donated to his own efforts. As member of the Army Reserve Battalion, he was called on active duty and assigned to the Redoubt # 2 in Miraflores. After books were looted from the National Library by the Chilean forces, he began collecting books to restore the library with the help of Ricardo Palma.

In 1892 Ricardo Rossel and Ricardo Palma attended the Hispanic American Literary Congress in Madrid, representing the Peruvian team.

During his bohemian life, he sang and played the guitar. He was a regular participant of the famous tertulias of the Argentinean writer Juana Manuela Gorriti while she lived in Lima. It is known that at his home since childhood, everyone played a musical instrument or sang, art perhaps inculcated especially by his mother, who appreciated singing and music from a young age. It was perhaps Ricardo Rossel and the poets of that time, who by putting music to their poetry gave creation to Peruvian folk music which evolved over time and then turned into the waltzes and polkas people still play and enjoy these days in Peru.

He died on December 6, 1909, at the city of Barranco at age 68.

Sleep in peace, my very dear brother in the literary work. You were always kind, loyal and honest, and how you enjoyed the success the production of your colleagues received. Envy never germinated in your spirit. Your heart, Ricardo, only knew to love. I don't say goodbye! But until one of these days!, your old friend.

— Ricardo Palma. Published in El Comercio newspaper.
