= Andrés Avelino Cáceres =

27th and 30th President of Peru

The Wizard of the Andes Andrés Avelino Cáceres
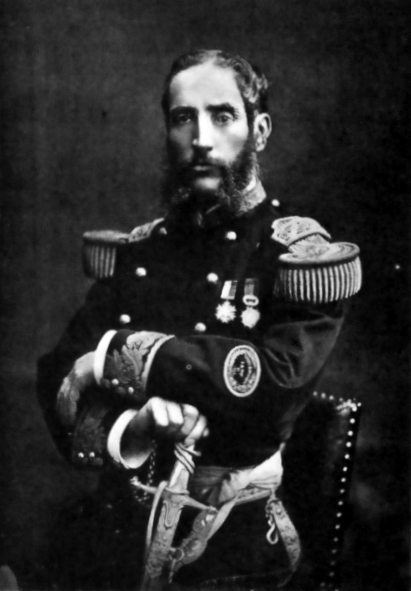

27th and 30th President of Peru
- In office 10 August 1894 – 20 March 1895
- Prime Minister: Cesáreo Chacaltana Reyes; Manuel Irigoyen Larrea
- Vice President: César Canevaro; Cesáreo Chacaltana Reyes
- Preceded by: Justiniano Borgoño (Interim President)
- Succeeded by: Manuel Candamo (President of the Provisional Government)
- In office 3 June 1886 – 10 August 1890
- Prime Minister: Antonio Arenas; Pedro Alejandrino del Solar Gabans; José Nicolas Araníbar y Llano; Mariano Santos Álvarez Villegas; Carlos Maria Elías y de la Quintana; Raymundo Morales Arias; Aurelio Denegri Valega; José Mariano Jiménez Wald; Manuel Irigoyen Larrea
- Vice President: Remigio Morales Bermúdez; Manuel Irigoyen Larrea
- Preceded by: Antonio Arenas (President of the Provisional Government)
- Succeeded by: Remigio Morales

Second Vice President of Peru
- In office 12 March 1881 – 6 November 1881
- President: Francisco García Calderón
- Preceded by: Vacant (last held by José Francisco Canevaro in 1879)
- Succeeded by: Vacant (Aurelio Denegri elected in 1886)

Senator from Callao
- In office 28 July 1901 – 25 October 1906

Senator from Ayacucho
- In office 28 July 1894 – 10 August 1894

Member of the Chamber of Deputies
- In office 28 July 1892 – 28 July 1893

Personal details
- Born: 10 November 1836 Ayacucho, Peru
- Died: 10 October 1923 (aged 86) Lima, Peru
- Party: Constitutional Party
- Spouse: Antonia Moreno Leyva
- Children: 3

Military service
- Allegiance: Peru
- Branch/service: Peruvian Army
- Years of service: 1854-1901
- Rank: Marshal
- Battles/wars: Peruvian Civil War of 1894-1895; War of the Pacific; Peruvian Civil War of 1884-1885

Andrés Avelino Cáceres Dorregaray (10 November 1836 – 10 October 1923) was a Peruvian politician and general who served as the President of Peru, from 1886 to 1890 as the 27th president, and again from 1894 to 1895 as the 30th. He is considered a Peruvian national hero for leading the resistance against the Chilean occupation during the War of the Pacific (1879–1883), in which he fought as a general in the Peruvian Army.

== Early years ==
Andrés Avelino Cáceres was born on 10 November 1833, in the city of Ayacucho. His father, Don Domingo Cáceres y Ore, was a landowner and his mother, Justa Dorregaray Cueva, daughter of the Spanish colonel Demetrio Dorregaray. He was mestizo; one of his maternal ancestors was Catalina Huanca, an Inka-Wanka princess. He studied at the Colegio San Ramón (Spanish: San Ramón School) in his hometown.

== Military career ==
In 1854, Cáceres abandoned his studies and joined the Ayacucho Battalion as a cadet. As part of this unit, he participated in the rebellion led by General Ramón Castilla against President José Rufino Echenique, which ended with the victory of the former at the Battle of La Palma (5 January 1855).

Afterwards, he quickly ascended through the military, obtaining the rank of Second Lieutenant later that year and that of Lieutenant in 1857. From 1857 to 1859 he actively supported Ramón Castilla's government against a rebellion by former president Manuel Ignacio de Vivanco. During the fighting, Cáceres was severely wounded in the left eye.

=== War against Ecuador ===
When war broke out between Peru and Ecuador in 1859, Cáceres was still ailing from his wound, but took part in the campaign. After the conflict ended in 1860, Castilla appointed Cáceres as military attaché of the Peruvian delegation to France and he traveled there. He received treatment for his eye in Paris. Cáceres returned to Peru in 1862 and joined the Pichincha Battalion in Huancayo.

=== War against Spain ===
During this period, he became known for his outspoken opposition to President Juan Antonio Pezet, who had allowed the Spanish occupation of the Chincha Islands in the Vivanco-Pareja Treaty of 1865. For his criticism he was exiled to Chile with several other officers but they managed to escape, landing at the southern port of Mollendo.

They joined the Revolución Restauradora del Honor Nacional (National Honor Restoring Revolution) led by Mariano Ignacio Prado against Pezet's government. Cáceres participated in the occupation of Lima and later, with Prado as president, in the Battle of Callao on 2 May 1866, which forced Spanish naval forces to retreat from Peruvian waters and the Chincha Islands.

=== Pardo's presidency ===
In 1868, Cáceres decided to end his military career and return to Ayacucho to live as a farmer. However, he returned to the political arena in 1872 opposing colonel Tomás Gutierrez's coup against president Manuel Pardo. Pardo was the first civilian President of Peru and founder of the influential Civilista Party which played an important role in Peruvian political history.

His support for Pardo's Presidency earned him support from Civilista Party leaders and he was appointed head of the Zepita Battalion. As such, in 1874, he suppressed a rebellion led by future Peruvian President Nicolás de Piérola in Moquegua. For this action, he was awarded the rank of colonel and later named prefect of Cuzco.

== War of the Pacific (1879–1883) ==
=== Southern campaigns ===
At the start of the War of the Pacific, (5 April 1879), Cáceres was sent with his Zepita Battalion to the province of Tarapacá. There, he fought against the Chilean Army in the battles of San Francisco and the Tarapacá. In the latter, his intervention was decisive to achieve a Peruvian victory against heavy odds.

Despite this victory, the Peruvian Army proved incapable of stopping the invasion and was forced to retreat north to the province of Tacna. Chileans landed north of this position, at Ilo, from where they attacked the main Peruvian position.

Cáceres played a major role in the reorganization of the Peruvian Southern Army. This Army was deployed around the city of Tacna together with a Bolivian Army led by the President of Bolivia himself, General Narciso Campero. However, the political instability created after Nicolás de Piérola successfully overthrew Mariano Ignacio Prado hampered the actions of the Allied Army against the Chileans.

On 26 May 1880, the Battle of Tacna was fought, where the Chileans defeated the combined Bolivian-Peruvian Army. Cáceres had a notable participation in this action after which he retreated to Lima.

=== Lima campaign ===
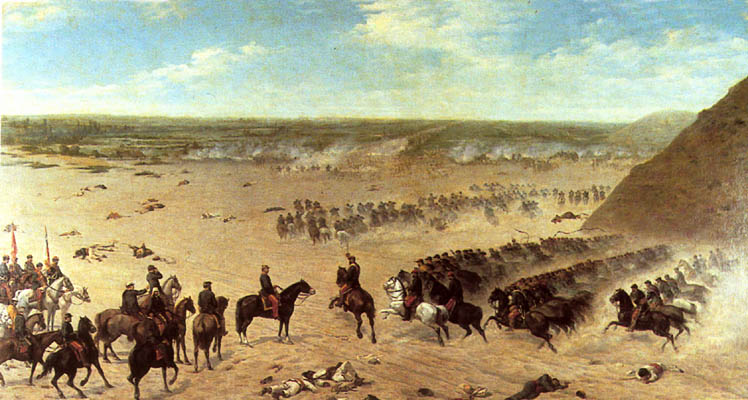
Chilean charge during the Battle of San Juan and Chorrillos.

Piérola ordered what was left of the Army to protect the capital, Lima, together with poorly armed citizens which were called to the fight. Cáceres was then put at the command of the 5th division of the Reserve. With no reinforcements available, and with the Chilean assault force deploying from the south, Peruvian forces were defeated in the battles of San Juan and Chorrillos and Miraflores. Cáceres was wounded in the latter combat and taken to Lima. When the city fell in January 1881, he escaped to Jauja in the mountainous hinterland of Peru.

=== La Breña campaign ===
Cáceres, upon learning about the abuses (executions and rapes) of the Chileans against civilians, including volunteer infantrymen and women in the defense of Lima during the campaigns of San Juan and Miraflores, and the beginning of the first expedition against him in 1881, Cáceres as revenge to the abused civilians, it was decided that the Chileans captured or wounded after each combat or battle would have their heads cut off and the heads of the Chileans would be used as a trophy war, to lower the morale of the Chileans. Subsequently, before the Huamachuco disaster, the Chileans decided to no longer commit abuses against civilians.

As the senior officer in the region, Cáceres was named Political - Military Chief of the departments of the center (26 April 1881). He dedicated himself to organizing resistance against Chilean occupation, conducting a guerrilla war for which he mobilized the peasant population. Thanks to the local support, the difficult terrain and his own military skills, Cáceres defeated several Chilean expeditions sent against him at the battles of Pucará and another battle there in July 1882, Marcavalle, and La Concepción.

For this feats, he was nicknamed as the Brujo de los Andes (The Andes Warlock). But in spite of all his talent and resolve, he was finally defeated by the better armed and trained Chilean forces in the Battle of Huamachuco (10 July 1883). Even though he tried to regroup, a Peruvian government headed by Miguel Iglesias signed the Treaty of Ancón (10 October 1883), recognizing defeat and bringing an end to the war.

== First presidency (1886–1890) ==
After the war, Cáceres refused to recognize Iglesias as president so a civil war ensued between these two factions. He evaded the enemy's army and attacked Lima on 28 November 1885, forcing Iglesias to resign on 12 December. The country was ruled by a Council of Ministers headed by Antonio Arenas while new elections took place. Running for the Constitutional Party, Cáceres won the elections as sole candidate and assumed as president on 3 June 1886.

The new government faced a serious economic crisis due to a huge debt and the severe damage caused by the War of the Pacific. As a solution for these problems, the Cáceres administration engaged in negotiations with its creditors, the result of which was the Grace Contract, signed on 28 October 1888, and approved by the Congress of Peru on 25 October 1889. Under the agreement, the Peruvian State handed over control of its railways, a guano concession, annual payments over 33 years and several minor concessions. In exchange, its creditors agreed to pay the country's debt and expand its railways.

The Grace Contract caused widespread controversy, the Cáceres administration was accused of having sold the country's main assets at a very low price among other things. In any case, the agreement allowed the government to solve its external debt problem and assured the expansion of Peruvian railways at a time when there were no public resources whatsoever for either task.

Other initiatives undertaken during this period included the end of the use of banknotes as legal tender the separation of State incomes between those of the central government and those of the departments, and a partial consolidation of the internal debt.Passed in 1886, this law did not entail administrative decentralization or local bureaucratization: it merely devolved revenue collection to the departments, entrenching the power of regional strongmen drawn from Cáceres's wartime soldiers rather than building state capacity. After the victory of Remigio Morales, the official candidate in the presidential elections of 13 April 1890, Cáceres transferred power to his successor on August 10 of the same year.

== Second presidency (1894–1895) ==
Morales Bermúdez died in office on 1 April 1894, and was replaced by Vice President of Peru Justiniano Borgoño. Subsequent presidential elections were won by Cáceres amid accusations of fraud. His second term was inaugurated on 10 August 1894.

There were widespread outbreaks of rebellion throughout the country, which eventually united under the leadership of former president Nicolás de Piérola. Rebel forces attacked Lima on 17 March 1895, the ensuing fight was stopped two days later by an armistice signed under the auspices of the diplomatic corps. Recognizing his defeat and unpopularity, Cáceres resigned and was replaced by an interim Government Junta.

== Later years ==
Salutation to the president by Daniel Hernández, 1921; in this painting, Cáceres can be seen standing next to President Leguía in full field marshal uniform.

After his downfall, Cáceres lived in Buenos Aires, Argentina from 1895 until 1899. He returned to Perú but left again, this time for Europe where he served as Peruvian ambassador in the Kingdom of Italy (1905–1911) and the German Empire and Austria–Hungary (1911–1914). Back in Lima, he supported Augusto B. Leguía in his campaign for the presidency and his successful coup against José Pardo in 1919. The new government awarded him the rank of Marshal on 10 November 1919. Cáceres died on 10 October 1923, in the town of Ancón at the age of 86.

== Legacy ==
In Peru, Cáceres is regarded as a nationalist figure. His image symbolizes resistance against foreign forces for his opposition to the Spanish occupation of the Chincha Islands and, more importantly, for organizing resistance against Chile, Peru's traditional enemy.

In recent years, in acknowledgement of this symbolism, a group of Peruvian military veterans have organized and adopted the name etnocacerista after Cáceres. Etnocaceristas now compose the bulk of the support for the Peruvian Nationalist Party.

An interesting legacy is found in the person of Zoila Aurora Cáceres, one of his daughters, who left behind a rich oeuvre of writing.

== See also ==
- Andrés Avelino Cáceres Museum

== Sources ==
- (in Spanish) Basadre, Jorge, Historia de la República del Perú. Editorial Universitaria, 1983.
- Basadre, Jorge (2014). Historia de la República del Perú [1822-1933]. Lima: Producciones Cantabria. ISBN 978-612-306-353-5.
- (in Spanish) Tauro del Pino, Alberto, Enciclopedia Ilustrada del Perú. Peisa, 2003.

Political offices
| Preceded by Lizardo Montero Flores | President of Peru (central); November 1881 – December 1882 | Succeeded by Miguel Iglesias |
| Preceded by Antonio Arenas | President of Peru; June 1886 – August 1890 | Succeeded by Remigio Morales |
| Preceded by Justiniano Borgoño | President of Peru; August 1894 – March 1895 | Succeeded by Manuel Candamo |
