= Federico Herrera =

Peruvian politician

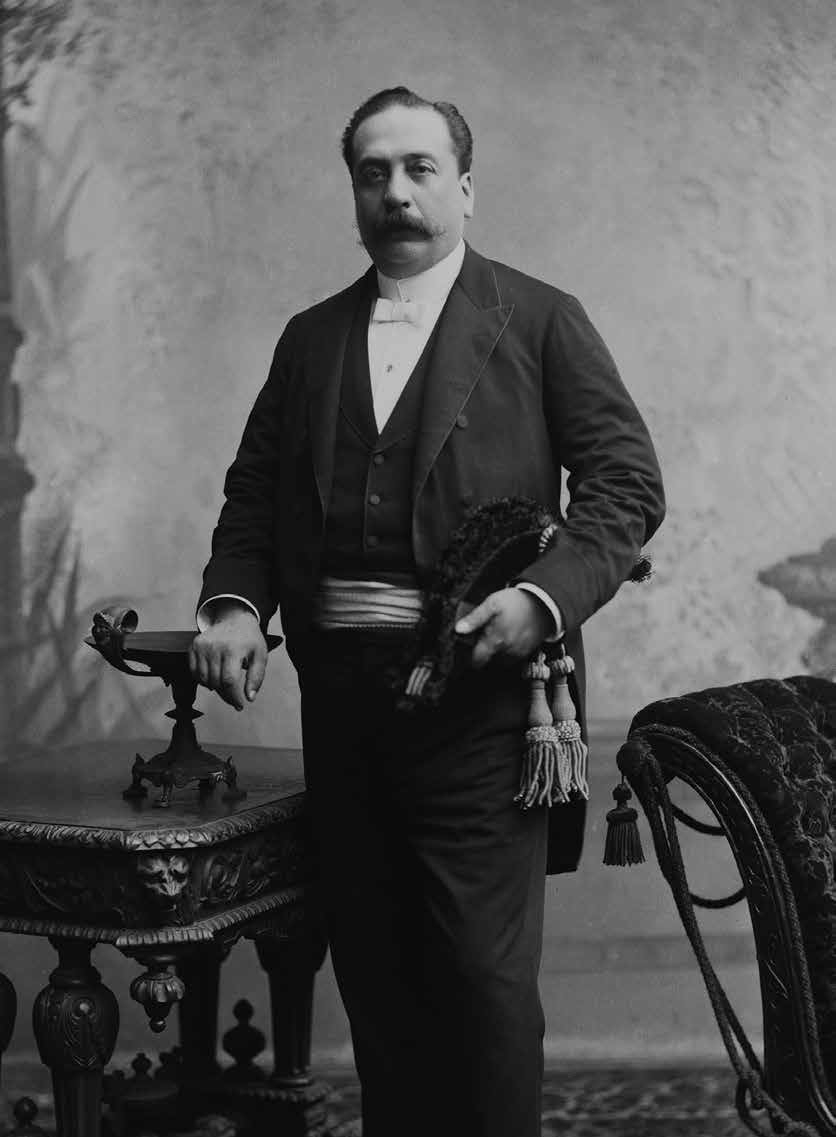

Federico Herrera (born 1845) was a Peruvian politician. He was born in Ayacucho, Peru. He was a member of the Constitutional Party (Peru). He served as minister of the interior in the Government of Peru. He was a member of the Chamber of Deputies of Peru. He served twice as Prime Minister of Peru (in August 1891 and from October 1891 to April 1892).

Preceded by Alberto Elmore Fernández de Córdoba	Prime Minister of Peru; August 14–24, 1891	Succeeded by Justiniano Borgoño
Preceded by Justiniano Borgoño	Prime Minister of Peru; October 14, 1891 – April 14, 1892	Succeeded by Juan Ibarra

== Bibliography ==
- Basadre Grohmann, Jorge: Historia de la República del Perú (1822 - 1933), Tomo 10. Editada por la Empresa Editora El Comercio S. A. Lima, 2005. ISBN 9972-205-72-X (V. 10).
