= Antonia Moreno Leyva =

Former first lady of Peru

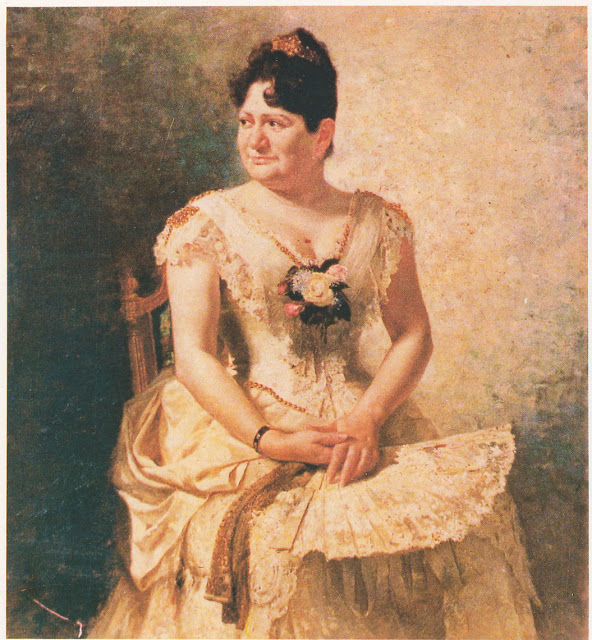
- Born: 1848
- Died: 1916 (aged 67–68)
- Resting place: Cripta de los Héroes del Cementerio Presbítero Maestro
- Known for: First lady of Peru
- Spouse: Andrés Avelino Cáceres

Antonia Moreno Leyva (1848-1916) was the first lady of Peru from 1886 to 1890 by her marriage to president Andrés Avelino Cáceres.

Prior to being president, her spouse participated in the War of the Pacific (1879–1883), and she accompanied him on the Breña campaign 1881. During the absence of her spouse, she actively participated in warfare and commanded battalions. She is the only woman to be buried in Cripta de los Héroes del Cementerio Presbítero Maestro, a cemetery for war heroes, after a special permission made it possible.
