= José Mariano Jiménez Wald =

Peruvian lawyer, judge and politician

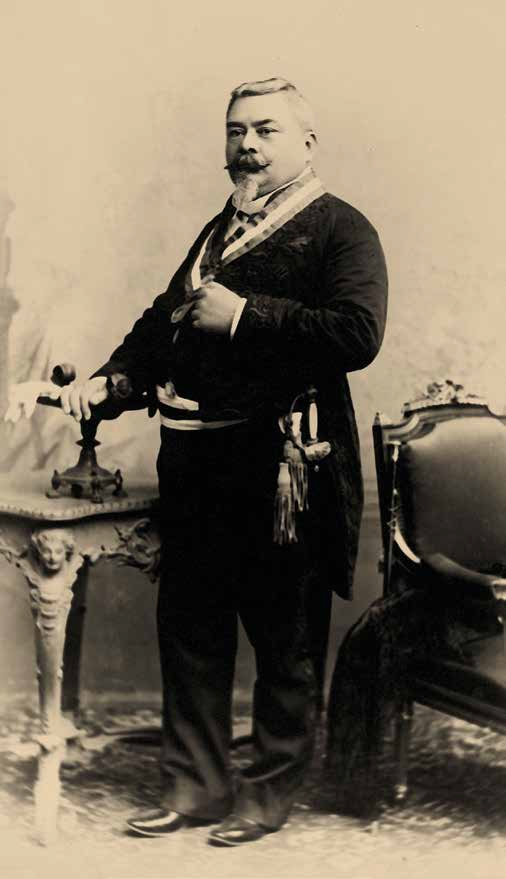
José Mariano Jiménez Wald (c. 1894)

José Mariano Jiménez Wald (January 30, 1843 – August 1, 1901) was a Peruvian lawyer, judge and politician. He graduated from the National University of San Marcos and served on its faculty. He served as foreign minister and minister of the interior in the Government of Peru. He was Prime Minister of Peru (March–April 1889, May 1893 – April 1894).

Preceded by Aurelio Denegri Valega	Prime Minister of Peru; March 8–April 4, 1889	Succeeded by Pedro Alejandrino del Solar Gabans
Preceded by Aurélio Denegri Valega	Minister of the Interior of Peru; March 8–April 4, 1889	Succeeded by Pedro Alejandrino del Solar Gabans
Preceded by Manuel Velarde Seoane	Prime Minister of Peru; May 11, 1893 – April 1, 1894	Succeeded by Baltasar García Urrutia
Preceded by Cesáreo Chacaltana Reyes	Minister of Foreign Affairs of Peru; May 1, 1893 – April 1, 1894	Succeeded by Baltasar García Urrutia

== Bibliography ==
- Basadre, Jorge: Historia de la República del Perú. 1822 - 1933, Octava Edición, corregida y aumentada. Tomo 8. Editada por el Diario "La República" de Lima y la Universidad "Ricardo Palma". Impreso en Santiago de Chile, 1998.
- Godoy, José Francisco: Enciclopedia biográfica de contemporáneos, 1898.
- Tauro del Pino, Alberto: Enciclopedia Ilustrada del Perú. Tercera Edición. Tomo 9. JAB/LLO. Lima, PEISA, 2001. ISBN 9972-40-158-8
