= Civic Union Party =

Defunct Peruvian political party

The Civic Union Party (Spanish: Partido Unión Cívica) was a political party in Peru, founded in 1892 by Mariano Nicolás Valcárcel.
