= Carlos Maria Elías y de la Quintana =

Peruvian diplomat and politician

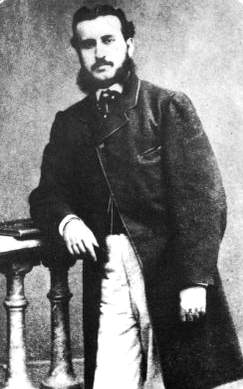
A portrait of Carlos Maria Elías y de la Quintana

Carlos Maria Elías y de la Quintana (September 18, 1841 – August 20, 1907) was a Peruvian diplomat and politician. He was born in Lima, Peru. He was a member of the Constitutional Party. He served in the Chamber of Deputies of Peru and Senate of Peru. He served as minister of foreign affairs and interior in the Government of Peru, as well as Minister to Argentina, Uruguay and Chile. He served twice as Prime Minister of Peru (September–October 1887, June 1892 – March 1893).

Preceded by Cesáreo Chacaltana Reyes	Minister of Foreign Affairs of Peru; August 22 – October 4, 1887	Succeeded by Domingo de Vivero
Preceded by Mariano Santos Álvarez Villegas	Prime Minister of Peru; September 12 – October 5, 1887	Succeeded by Raymundo Morales Arias
Preceded by Juan Ibarra	Prime Minister of Peru; June 30, 1892 – March 3, 1893	Succeeded by Manuel Velarde Seoane
