= José María Raygada y Gallo =

Peruvian politician

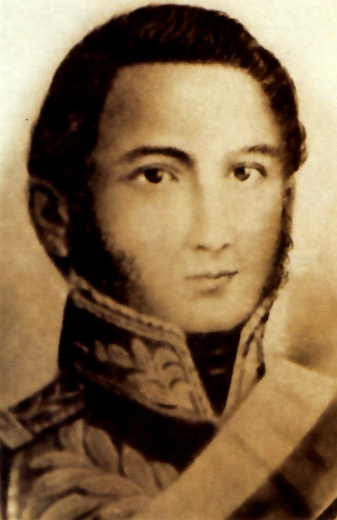

José María Raygada y Gallo (18 December 1795 – 15 January 1859) was a 19th-century Peruvian politician. He was twice Prime Minister of Peru (1857 – 15 July 1858; October 1858 – 15 January 1859). He died in office.

| Preceded by Juan Manuel del Mar Bernedo | Prime Minister of Peru; 1857 – 15 July 1858 | Succeeded by Miguel de San Román |
| Preceded by Miguel de San Román | Prime Minister of Peru; October 1858 – January 1859 | Succeeded by Juan Antonio Pezet |
