= Juan Manuel del Mar =

Peruvian politician (1805–1862)

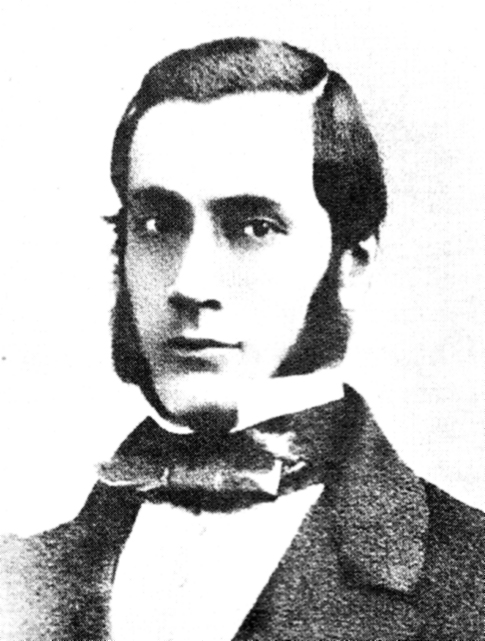

4th Vice President of Peru
- In office October 24, 1858 – June 16, 1862
- President: Ramón Castilla
- Preceded by: Office reestablished (Last held by Antonio Gutiérrez de la Fuente in 1831)
- Succeeded by: Vacant (Juan Antonio Pezet and Pedro Diez Canseco elected in October 1862)

1st Prime Minister of Peru
- In office December 1856 – 1857
- President: Ramón Castilla
- Preceded by: Office established
- Succeeded by: José María Raygada y Gallo

Minister of Government, Worship and Public Works
- In office April 1, 1857 – July 13, 1858
- President: Ramón Castilla
- Preceded by: Ignacio de Osma
- Succeeded by: Manuel Morales

Minister of Government, Justice and Worship
- In office December 1855 – October 24, 1856
- President: Ramón Castilla
- Preceded by: Manuel Toribio Ureta
- Succeeded by: Jervasio Alvarez y Montaño

Senator from Cusco
- In office 1845–1846

Member of the Chamber of Deputies
- In office July 29, 1832 – December 22, 1832
- Constituency: Paucartambo, Cusco

Personal details
- Born: December 29, 1805 Lima, Viceroyalty of Peru
- Died: June 16, 1862 (aged 56) Lima, Peru
- Spouse: Clara Buendía y Carrillo
- Parent(s): Pablo del Mar; Margarita Bernedo
- Education: Saint Anthony the Abbot Seminary
- Occupation: Statesman
- Profession: Lawyer

Juan Manuel del Mar Bernedo (December 29, 1805 – June 16, 1862) was a 19th-century Peruvian politician. He served as the 4th Vice President of Peru from October 1858 to June 1862.
