= Rosa Merino (singer) =

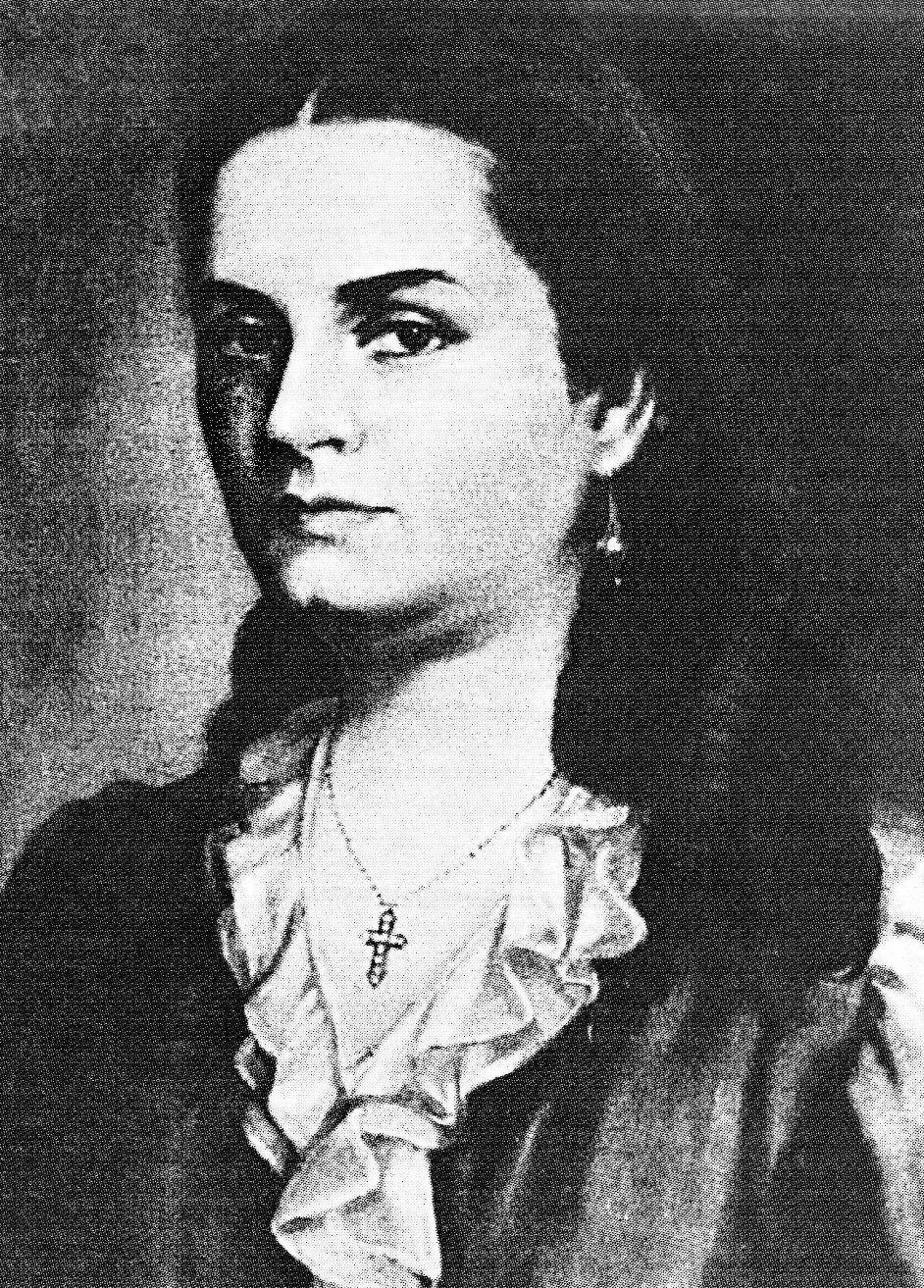
- A Portrait of Rosa Merino
- Born: 1790; Lima, Viceroyalty of Peru
- Died: 1 January 1868 (aged 77)
- Occupations: Singer, soprano
- Known for: Singing the National Anthem of Peru

Rosa Merino (1790–1868) was a Peruvian soprano. She is considered to be the first singer of the National Anthem of Peru and one of the first patriot women of Peru.

== Biography ==
Rosa Merino was born in Lima, the capital of Peru, in 1790.

She became famous in 1812, but until then Merino she performed in the record company of Andrés Bolognesi. She took parts in the opera La Isabela.

Afterward, Rosa Merino became very popular among contemporary Peruvian people with the patriotic song La Chicha, which was unofficially considered the first Peruvian national anthem. After a contest, that was sponsored by General Jose de San Martin, Rosa Merino was chosen to sing the "National Anthem of Peru" for the first time on 23 September 1821.

In the last fifteen years of her life she continued to perform for charity evenings and lyrical events. She is considered to be one of the first patriot women of Peru.

== See also ==
- National Anthem of Peru
