= Aurelio Denegri =

Peruvian politician (1840–1909)

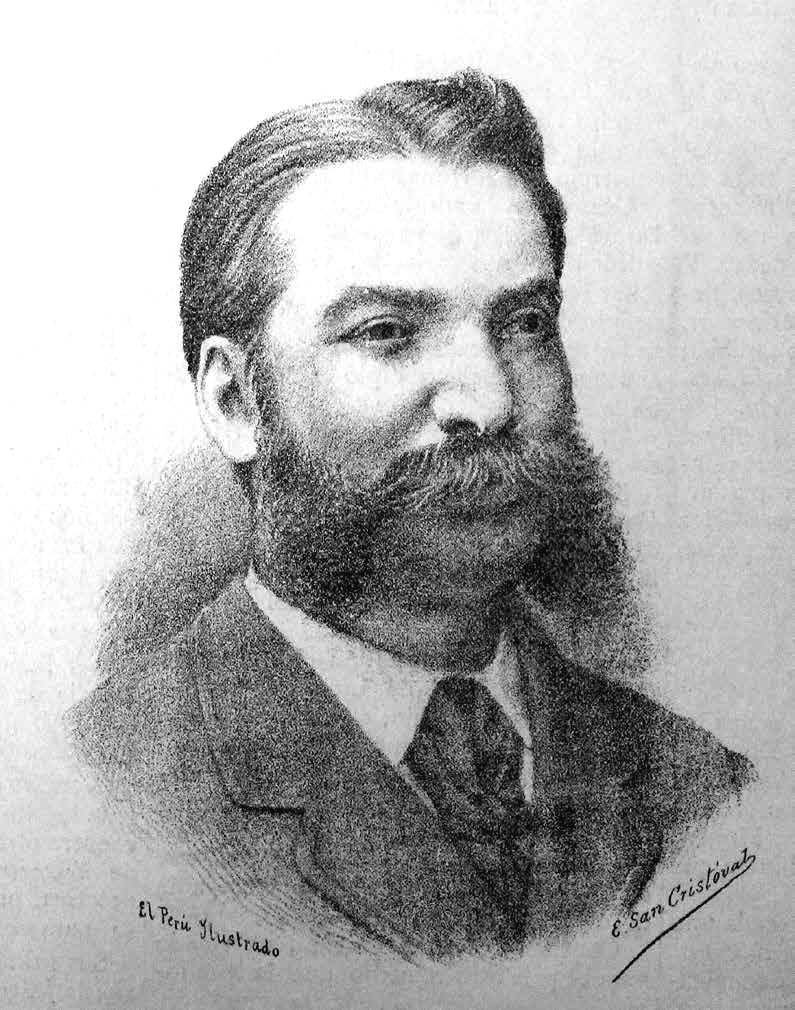
Portrait of Aurelio Denegri, c. 1890; by Evaristo San Cristóval

Marco Aurelio Denegri Valega (1840–1909) was a Prime Minister of Peru under Andrés Avelino Cáceres in 1881. He was the mayor of Lima 1874–1875. He was Minister of Finance in 1879 and from 1881 to 1883. He served as the second vice president from 1886 to 1890.

Political offices
Preceded by Manuel Gonzáles de la Cotera	Prime Minister of Peru; 1881	Succeeded by Lorenzo Iglesias Pino de Arce
