= Antonio Arenas =

Peruvian politician

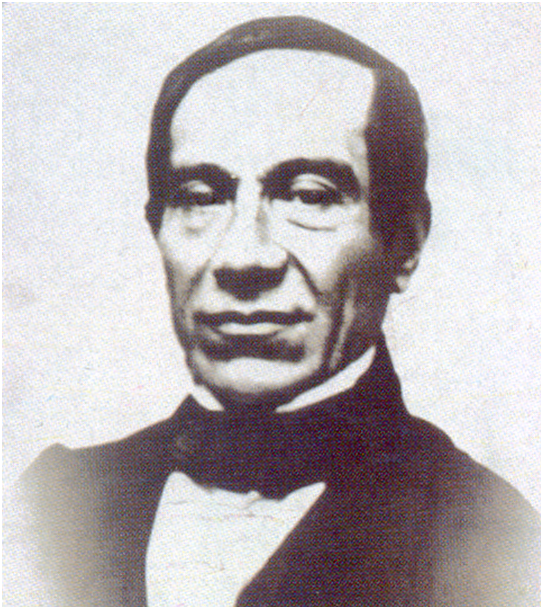
Antonio Arenas.

Antonio Arenas Merino (July 13, 1808, Lima – December 27, 1891) was a Peruvian politician. He served as the President of the Chamber of Deputies from 1860 to 1862, and President of the Constituent Congress from 1884 to 1885. Arenas served as the Interim Caretaker of Peru, officially as the President of the Government Junta of Peru, from December 3, 1885 to July 5, 1886. He also served as Prime Minister of Peru on several occasions.

Political offices
Preceded by Luis La Puerta	Prime Minister of Peru; 1868	Succeeded by José Balta
Preceded by Nicolás Freire de Neira	Prime Minister of Peru; 1876	Succeeded by Teodoro La Rosa
Preceded by Joaquín Iglesias Pino de Arce	Prime Minister of Peru; 1885–1886	Succeeded by Pedro Alejandrino del Solar Gabans
Preceded by Miguel Iglesias (north), Andrés Avelino Cáceres (south)	Interim Caretaker of Peru; 1885–1886	Succeeded by Andrés Avelino Cáceres
