= Constitutional Party (Peru) =

Constitutional Party Partido Constitucional
- Historical leaders: Andrés Avelino Cáceres, Remigio Morales Bermúdez
- Founded: 1886
- Dissolved: 1896
- Headquarters: Lima
- Ideology: Nationalism; Cácerism; Conservatism
- Political position: Right-wing

The Constitutional Party (Spanish: Partido Constitucional) was a political party in Peru. The party was founded in 1886 by Andrés Avelino Cáceres, a national hero from the War of the Pacific. The party was an expression of the nationalist and military oligarchy, in addition to the biggest landowners and the Catholic Church.

The Constitutional Party formed an agreement with the Civil Party to arrest the Democratic Party's advancement, causing a civil war in 1895. However, after the end of civil war in 1896, the party was ousted from power and dissolved.
