= Pedro Alejandrino del Solar =

Peruvian lawyer, journalist and diplomat

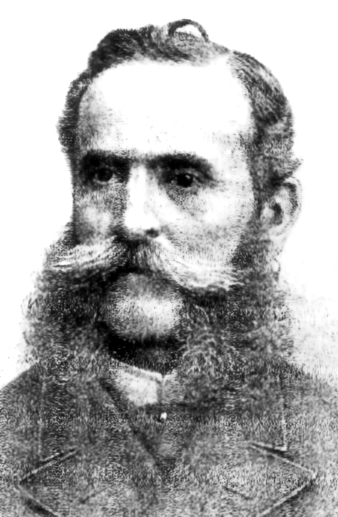
Pedro Alejandrino del Solar

Pedro Alejandrino del Solar Gabas (November 26, 1829 – June 6, 1909) was a Peruvian lawyer, journalist and diplomat. He was born in Lima, Peru. He graduated from the National University of San Marcos and served on its faculty. He served as the President of the Chamber of Deputies from May 1886 to June 1886. He was a three-time Prime Minister of Peru (June–October 1886, November 1886 – August 1887, April 1889 – February 1890). He served as the first vice president from 1890 to 1894. He also served as minister of justice, and in the Senate of Peru.

Preceded by Antonio Arenas	Prime Minister of Peru; June 5–October 6, 1886	Succeeded by José Nicolas Araníbar y Llano
Preceded by José Nicolas Araníbar y Llano	Prime Minister of Peru; November 22, 1886 – August 22, 1887	Succeeded by Mariano Santos Álvarez Villegas
Preceded by José Mariano Jiménez Wald	Prime Minister of Peru; April 4, 1889 – February 10, 1890	Succeeded by Manuel Irigoyen Larrea

== Bibliography ==
- Basadre, Jorge: Historia de la República del Perú. 1822 - 1933, Octava Edición, corregida y aumentada. Tomo 9. Editada por el Diario "La República" de Lima y la Universidad "Ricardo Palma". Impreso en Santiago de Chile, 1998.
- Chirinos Soto, Enrique: Historia de la República (1821-1930). Tomo I. Lima, AFA Editores Importadores S.A., 1985.
- Tauro del Pino, Alberto: Enciclopedia Ilustrada del Perú. Tercera Edición. Tomo 15, SAL/SZY. Lima, PEISA, 2001. ISBN 9972-40-164-1
- Vargas Ugarte, Rubén: Historia General del Perú. Tomo XI. Primera Edición. Editor Carlos Milla Batres. Lima, Perú, 1971.
