= Mariano Valcárcel =

Peruvian lawyer and politician

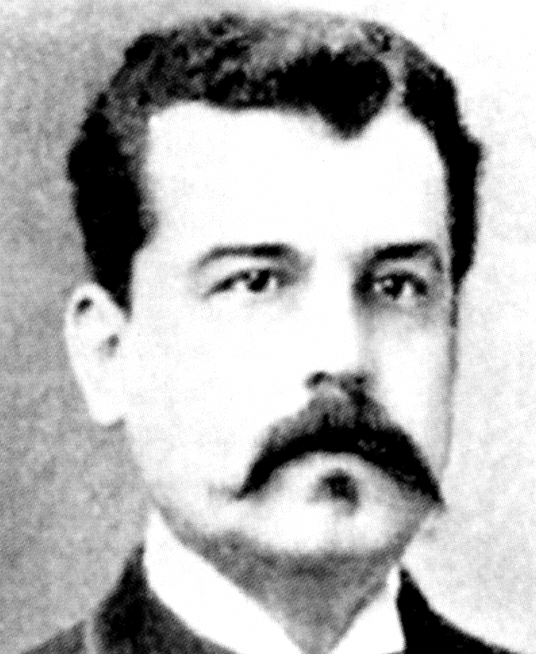

Mariano Nicolás Valcárcel (September 10, 1850 – December 1, 1921) was a Peruvian lawyer and politician. He was born in Arequipa, Peru. He served as foreign minister (1882–1883) and minister of the interior (1890–1891) in the Government of Peru. He was Prime Minister of Peru (August 1890 – July 1891). He served in the Chamber of Deputies of Peru and was elected as its president three times (1889, 1891 and 1893).

Preceded by Epifanio Serpa	Minister of Foreign Affairs of Peru; October 10, 1882 – October 1883	Succeeded by Francisco Flores Chinarro
Preceded by Manuel Irigoyen Larrea	Prime Minister of Peru; August 10, 1890 – July 24, 1891	Succeeded by Alberto Elmore Fernández de Córdoba
Preceded by Guillermo Ferreyros	Minister of the Interior of Peru; August 11, 1890 – July 30, 1891	Succeeded by Francisco G. Chávez

== Bibliography ==
- Basadre, Jorge: Historia de la República del Perú. 1822 - 1933, Octava Edición, corregida y aumentada. Tomo 8. Editada por el Diario "La República" de Lima y la Universidad "Ricardo Palma". Impreso en Santiago de Chile, 1998.
- Tauro del Pino, Alberto: Enciclopedia Ilustrada del Perú. Tercera Edición. Tomo 17, VAC-ZUZ. Lima, PEISA, 2001. ISBN 9972-40-166-9
