= Miguel Iglesias =

President of Peru from 1883 to 1885

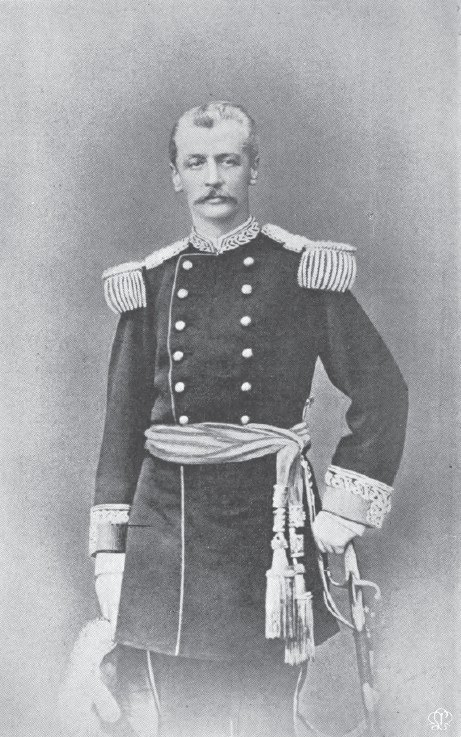

26th President of Peru (Regenerator Government)
- In office January 1, 1883 – December 3, 1885
- Preceded by: Andrés Avelino Cáceres; Lizardo Montero^{(La Magdalena Government)}
- Succeeded by: Antonio Arenas

Personal details
- Born: June 11, 1830 Celendín
- Died: November 7, 1909 (aged 79) Lima

Miguel Iglesias Pino de Arce (11 June 1830 – 7 November 1909) was a Peruvian soldier, general, and politician from Cajamarca, Peru who served as the 26th President of Peru (Regenerator President of the Republic) from 1882 to 1885.

== Early life and family ==
The original name of his family was de la Iglesia. He was a descendant of a line of Catalans from the town of Solivella. His father left for Peru in the early 19th century to join three uncles on Iglesias's mother's side who had founded the Chota silver mine, near the town of Cajamarca, in the county of the same name, in northern Peru, in 1780. Lorenzo Iglesias Espinach became both the heir of his uncles and sub-prefect of Cajamarca; he was a friend of Simón Bolívar, who stayed with him in Cajamarca and was one of the groups of dissident Spanish colonists who supported independence from Spain. In 1820, Lorenzo Iglesias married Rosa Pino, and their son, Miguel, was born ten years later.

Miguel Iglesias Pino, inherited a 250,000-acre (1,000 km^{2}) estate from his family as well as lucrative silver mines. His power in the town of Cajamarca and the surrounding area was that of a feudal magnate, and he had been recruiting troops with his own money—effectively a private army—since the war with Spain in 1866. He had been one of the senior army officers present at the Peruvian victory in the Battle of Callao and for his efforts was promoted to the rank of Colonel, and was named Prefect of Cajamarca. In 1874, Iglesias initiated a revolution against the government of President Manuel Pardo and proclaimed himself the political and military Chief of the North. Even though Iglesias's rebellion was a failure, he was not brought to account because no one in Lima dared to confront the power of Iglesias in Cajamarca. Thus, Iglesias managed to consolidate his position in his northern Peruvian fiefdom.

== War of the Pacific and presidency ==
War broke out in 1879 between a coalition of Peru and Bolivia against Chile over a border dispute. Iglesias commenced raising a new private militia. The war quickly began to go wrong for Peru. In the campaign of November 1879, the Peruvian Navy lost their two most important warships: the iron-clad Independencia was sunk by the corvette Covadonga, and the iron-clad Huascar was captured by the iron-clads Cochrane and Blanco Encalada, which had been supplied to Chile and Peru by British shipyards; the southern department of Tarapacá was overrun, and the professional Peruvian army was defeated. Subsequently, Iglesias's friend, Nicolás de Piérola, launched a successful coup d'état, declaring himself Supreme Commander in Chief. On December 23, 1879, he replaced President Prado, who was considered to have mismanaged the conduct of the war thus far. One of the battalions lending their armed support to Pierola was Iglesias's "Vencedores de Cajamarca," and Pierola appointed Iglesias as Secretary of War in his new government.

Iglesias personally took charge of organizing the defence of the Peruvian capital city against the advancing Chileans in January 1881. Iglesias's main defensive lines were at the Morro Solar, a hill south of Lima. Under his command were 5000 men, mostly recruited from Cajamarca. After the Peruvian Second Division had been forced to retreat from San Juan, the battle for Lima concentrated on the Morro Solar. The first Chilean attack on the hill was repulsed, although reinforcements and artillery arrived. Iglesias found himself surrounded and outnumbered by 9000 Chilean troops and came under a withering barrage. Because the professional Peruvian army had previously been decimated in the south, losing much of its most modern equipment, Iglesias had only primitive, Peruvian-manufactured rifles without adequate sights and inferior to the Chilean Krupps. Of the men who defended the Morro Solar, only 280 were taken prisoner. Among those killed was General Iglesias's son Alejandro, aged 22.

Having escaped back to Cajamarca, Iglesias continued the war against Chile in the north of Peru, while General Andrés Avelino Cáceres fought against the Chileans in the Andes. Iglesias achieved a victory over the Chileans at San Pablo, Cajamarca, on 13 July 1882, but soon afterward, a Chilean force reoccupied the region and carried out brutal reprisals.

On 23 October 1883, Iglesias signed the Treaty of Ancón on behalf of Peru, thereby ending the hostilities. The Treaty had fourteen clauses. Peru paid with Tarapacá as war reparations while the southern department of Arica and Tacna was to decide in a referendum, to be held ten years hence, whether it wanted to join Chile or remain part of Peru.

This treaty was opposed, however, by General Cáceres and his forces, who began a guerilla campaign.

After the signing of the treaty, Iglesias convened a constitutional convention to declare himself president; but the forces of Caceres did not recognize him. Cáceres proceeded to proclaim himself President on July 16, 1884, arguing the breakdown of the constitutional order. On 27 August 1884, guerrilla fighters launched an armed assault against Lima and almost managed to fight their way into the presidential palace, but were repulsed. However, a year later, they were successful, forcing Iglesias to renounce the presidency in December 1885. He took refuge on an Italian ship, and eventually reached his estate of Udima in Cajamarca.

Antonio Arenas, president of the Council of Ministers, assumed the Presidency, giving way to a constitutional transition.

== Post-presidency ==
Iglesias and his family went into exile in Spain till 1888 when the ban against Iglesias was lifted, and they were able to return to Peru. President Caceres reinstated Iglesias as a General with full pay and sent the news to him by special messenger.

A few years later, in 1895, Iglesias was elected Senator by the people of Cajamarca voted in an uncontested election.

Iglesias and his wife had eleven children, and 1895 was also the year that the General's youngest daughter, Gaudencia, married a Scot named Edgar Fraser Luckie, who had made a fortune from gold mining in British Guiana and then bought the Andalusia sugar farming estate near Sayan, north of Lima.

He died on 7 November 1909 in Lima.

== See also ==
- List of presidents of Peru

Political offices
| Preceded by Andrés Avelino Cáceres | Provisional President of Peru (north); 1882–1885 | Succeeded by Antonio Arenas |
