= Embassy of Colombia, Caracas =

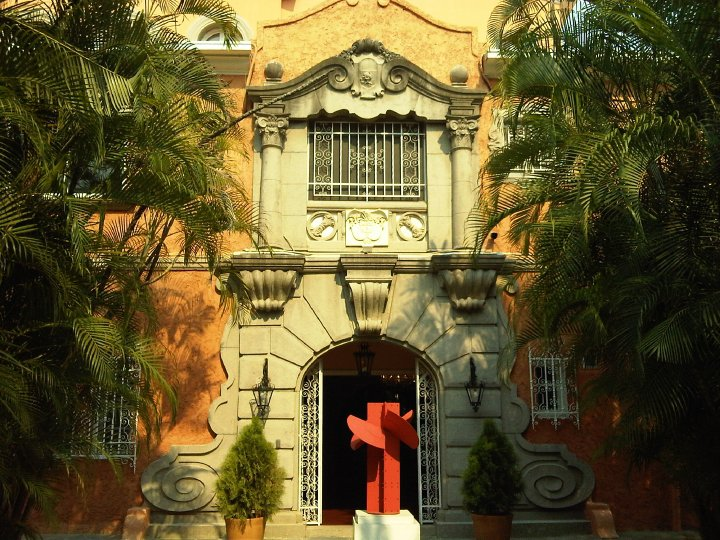
- Address: Torre Credival, 11th Floor; 2da Avenida, Campo Alegre; Caracas 1060, Venezuela
- Coordinates: 10°29′32.30″N 66°51′45.00″W
- Ambassador: Carlos Cure Cure

The Embassy of Colombia in Caracas is the diplomatic mission of the Republic of Colombia to the Bolivarian Republic of Venezuela; it is headed by the Ambassador of Colombia to Venezuela. It is located in the Campo Alegre neighbourhood of Caracas.

== Duties ==
The Embassy is also accredited to the Co-operative Republic of Guyana, and the Republic of Suriname. The Embassy is charged with representing the interests of the President and Government of Colombia, improving diplomatic relations between Colombia and the accredited countries, promoting and improving the image and standing of Colombia in the accredited nations, promoting the Culture of Colombia, encouraging and facilitating tourism to and from Colombia, and ensuring the safety of Colombians abroad.

== History ==
After the 2002 Venezuelan coup d'état attempt Pedro Carmona, president of the Venezuelan Federation of Chambers of Commerce (FEDECAMARAS) who served briefly as interim President of Venezuela when Hugo Chávez was removed from power, was placed under house arrest, but he was able to gain asylum in the Colombian embassy after an anti-Chávez protest drew away his security detail.

During the 2008 Andean diplomatic crisis, on 3 March, Venezuela's foreign ministry released a statement announcing to expel Colombia's ambassador and all diplomatic staff at the Colombian embassy in Caracas.

== Recent Ambassadors ==
- Under Virgilio Barco (1986 - 1990)
  - (1987 - 1990): Pedro Gómez Barrero
- Under César Gaviria (1990 - 1994)
  - (1990 - 1991): Noemí Sanín
  - (1992 - 1993): Rodrigo Pardo
  - (1993 - 1994): Alberto Casas Santamaría
- Under Ernesto Samper (1994 - 1998)
  - (1994 - 1996): Francisco Posada de la Peña
  - (1996 - 1996): Guillermo Alberto González
  - (1997 - 1998): Mario Suárez Melo
- Under Andrés Pastrana (1998 - 2002)
  - (1998 - 1999): Luis Guillermo Giraldo
  - (2000 - 2002): Germán Bula Escobar
- Under Álvaro Uribe Vélez (2002 - 2010)
  - (2002 - 2004): María Ángela Holguín
  - (2004 - 2006): Enrique Vargas Ramírez
  - (2006 - 2009): Fernando Marín Valencia
  - (2009 - 2010): María Luisa Chiappe
- Under Juan Manuel Santos (2010 - 2014)
  - (2010 - 2011): José Fernando Bautista
  - (2011 - 2013): Carlos Cure
  - (2013 - 2014): Luis Eladio Pérez
  - (2015 - 2018): Ricardo Lozano Forero
- Under Iván Duque (2018 - 2022)
  - Vacante
- Under Gustavo Petro (2022 - 2026)
  - (2022 - 2023): Armando Benedetti
  - (2023 - 2026): Milton Rengifo

== See also ==
- Colombia–Venezuela relations
