= Embassy of Colombia, Lima =

Diplomatic mission of Colombia to Peru

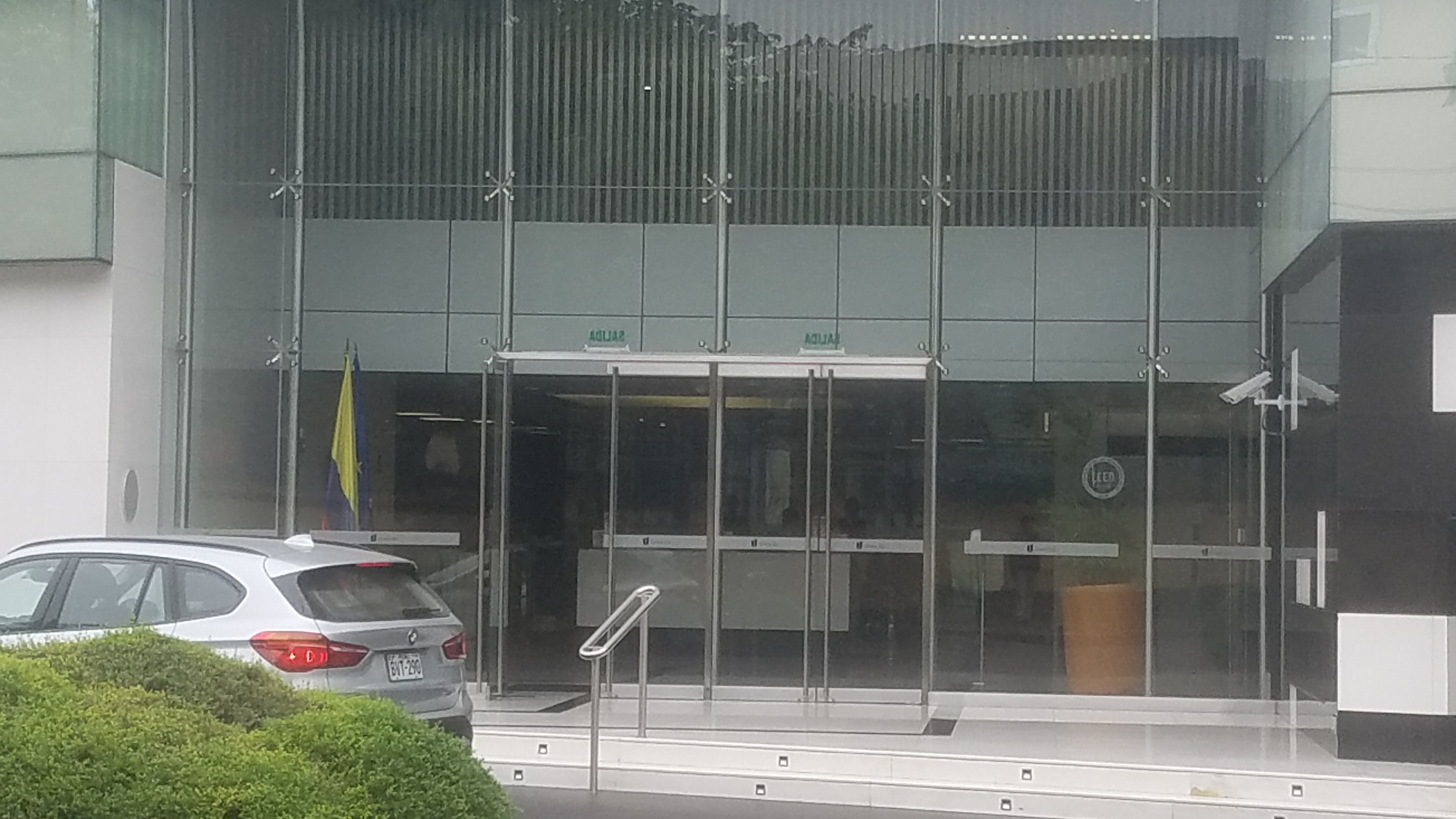
- Location: San Isidro District, Lima
- Address: Edificio Cromo (Of. 602), 340 Víctor Andrés Belaúnde Avenue
- Ambassador: Eufracio Morales (Note: Chargé d'affaires since December 2022.)

Cultural Heritage of Peru
- Designated: December 2, 1998
- Part of: El Olivar Monumental Zone (Note: Applies only to the building used as the ambassador's residence in Arequipa Avenue.)
- Legal basis: R.D.N. Nº 410/INC

The Embassy of Colombia in Peru represents the permanent diplomatic mission of the Republic of Colombia in Peru. It is located at the sixth floor of the Edificio Cromo, an office building located at 340 Víctor Andrés Belaúnde Avenue, in central San Isidro District, Lima. The building is shared with the delegation of the European Union to Peru.

== History ==
Both countries established relations on June 6, 1822. Relations were initially amicable, although a territorial dispute soon led to conflict between both states. The first such conflict was the Gran Colombia–Peru War, being followed by skirmishes that would last almost a century after, culminating in the 20th century Battle of La Pedrera and the Colombia–Peru War, ultimately being resolved by the Salomón–Lozano Treaty and the 1934 Rio Protocol.

Relations remained amicable, with both countries cooperating in several international organizations, until 2023, when Colombian president Gustavo Petro's comments in support of the ongoing protests in favour of deposed president Pedro Castillo and against president Dina Boluarte caused controversy in Peru, with relations being downgraded at a ministerial level.

The former chancery, located at 1580 Jorge Basadre Grohmann Avenue, is currently occupied by the embassy of Hungary to Peru. In 2014, it flew its flag at half-mast due to the death of Gabriel García Márquez.

=== Residence ===
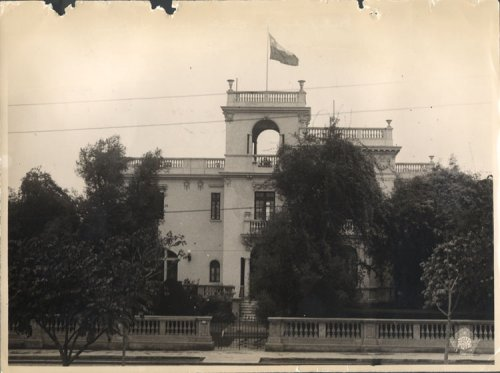
The building under Chilean use.

The embassy's residence is a building built in 1923 designed by Ricardo de Jaxa Malachowski and acquired by the Colombian government in 1946. Prior to the acquisition, it was used by Chile.

On February 18, 1933, due to the then ongoing Colombia–Peru War, the Colombian minister's residence was attacked by Peruvians, who rioted outside of the building and ultimately entered and looted it. The consulate in Callao was also attacked.

In 1948, Ambassador Carlos Echeverri Cortés drew the wrath of President Manuel Arturo Odría Amoretti and his administration when he gave political asylum to Víctor Raúl Haya de la Torre in the embassy. For five years the Government mounted a military blockade around the Colombian Embassy where Haya was housed, and harassed embassy staff and personnel, because the Colombian Government refuse to give Haya up and the Peruvian Government refused to grant safe conduct for Haya to leave the country.

== List of representatives ==
The Ambassador Extraordinary and Plenipotentiary of the Republic of Colombia to Peru serves as the embassy's foremost representative, being appointed by the country's president.

Representative	Title	Term start	Term end	Notes
Joaquín Mosquera	MP	October 1, 1821	1823	First representative; accredited to Peru, Chile and Argentina.
Cristóbal de Armero	C	1822	June 25, 1827	Presented by Minister Mosquera and confirmed by V.P. Santander. He was named by Simón Bolívar as consul. In 1925, he was recognised as chargé d'affaires of the Colombian legation until he ceased to be recognised by the Peruvian government.
Cristóbal de Armero	CdA	January 1825	June 25, 1827	Presented by Minister Mosquera and confirmed by V.P. Santander. He was named by Simón Bolívar as consul. In 1925, he was recognised as chargé d'affaires of the Colombian legation until he ceased to be recognised by the Peruvian government.
Luis Urdaneta	CP	March 1823	April 1823	He left Guayaquil on March 13 and had returned by April 13.
Juan Paz del Castillo	P*	March 1823	March 1823	Designated to commemorate the aid agreement signed on March 18.
Antonio José de Sucre	MP	April 12, 1823?	June 4, 1823	He reached Lima aboard the schooner Guayaliqueña on May 4 and presented his credentials on May 11, receiving his instructions on April 13 (and additional ones on May 25). His term de facto ended when he joined the United Army.
José Gabriel Pérez	CG	November 16, 1824	April 1, 1825	Col. Pérez (1780–1828) was recognised in November, quitting the same day he was named as Bolívar's secretary.
Antonio José de Sucre	MP	N/A	N/A	Appointed on March 25, 1825, he did not take office due to him being in charge of the government in Bolivia.
Carlos Eloy Demarquet	SC	June 25, 1829	August 10, 1829	In charge of delivering Bolívar's letter to Antonio Gutiérrez de la Fuente, he presented his credentials on July 25 and returned in August.
Pedro Gual Escandón	P	August 31, 1829	September 1829	Named in August, he signed the Larrea–Gual Treaty on September 22.
Tomás Cipriano de Mosquera	MP	October 21, 1829	July 24, 1830	After being formally named, he presented his credentials on November 30 and received his instructions on January 20, resigning in July via a note.
Francisco Eugenio Tamariz and Domingo Agustín Gómez	Co.*	October 10, 1829?	October 1829	Sent to Tumbes to resolve the border dispute, they received their instructions on the same day they were named.
José María Romero and Federico J. Freundt	Co.*	1830		
Rufino Cuervo y Barreto	MP*	January 27, 1842		
Juan de Francisco Martín	DP*	December 11, 1847	March 1, 1848	Replaced José Vicente Martínez, who had been originally named, as delegate to the American Congress of Lima.
José María Obando	MP	July 10, 1850	October 19, 1850	In October, Peruvian Foreign Minister Manuel Ferreyros stated that "the Government would prefer not to receive him in his public capacity."
Mariano Arosemena	CdA	July 1851	September 10, 1852	Recognised on December 10. He was named minister resident on September 10, 1852.
Mariano Arosemena	MR	September 10, 1852	June 1853	Recognised on December 10. He was named minister resident on September 10, 1852.
Manuel Ancízar	CdA		1855	
Florentino Gonzales	MP	March 1859	1860	After being named, he presented his credentials May 3.
Próspero Pereira Gamba	CdA	1862		
Pablo Arosemena	MP	1879	1880	Accredited to Peru and Chile.
José María González Valencia	MP	1917	July 1919	He presented his credentials on May 5, 1918.
Manuel Antonio Carvajal	CdA*	July 1919	May 8, 1920	Originally a secretary, he was recognised in July 1919.
Fabio Lozano Torrijos	MP	1920	1930	He presented his credentials on May 8, 1920, and was a signatory of the 1922 Salomón–Lozano Treaty. His sons Fabio and Carlos served as secretary and civil attaché, respectively.
Antonio Gómez Restrepo	AE*	July 28, 1921	July 28, 1921	Sent to the Centennial celebrations in Lima.
Antonio José Uribe	AE*	December 9, 1924	December 9, 1924	Sent to the Centennial celebrations in Ayacucho.
Miguel Jiménez López	?	December 9, 1924	December 9, 1924	Sent to the Centennial celebrations in Ayacucho.
Fabio Lozano Torrijos	AE*	October 12, 1929	October 12, 1929	Sent to the inauguration of Augusto B. Leguía.
Fabio Lozano Torrijos	CdA*	1930	October 20, 1931	Recognised in 1930.
Fabio Lozano Torrijos	MP	October 20, 1931	February 15, 1933	Left aboard the steamer Santa Clara on February 23 due to the Colombia–Peru War.
Laureano García	EEP	September 1932	January 16, 1933	Named in September, he presented his credentials on October 11, receiving the same orders as Lozano to leave the country immediately due to the war.
Fred Morris Dearing	AEP	February 18, 1933	1933	U.S. Ambassador to Peru; in charge of Colombian interests in Peru due to the war.
Alfonso López Pumarejo	-	May 18, 1933	May 22, 1933	Invited by Óscar R. Benavides to visit Lima in order to improve relations after corresponding with him during his electoral campaign.
Gabriel Turbay	MP	June 15, 1934	December 7, 1934	Named in June, he presented his credentials on August 6.
Roberto Urdaneta Arbeláez	AEP	November 28, 1939	December 23, 1939	First ambassador to Peru. He presented his credentials on December 23.
Luis López de Mesa	PD	December 1938	December 1938	López and his delegation travelled to Lima to attend the Eighth International Conference of American States.
Roberto Urdaneta Arbeláez	A*	December 8, 1939	December 8, 1939	Sent to attend the inauguration of Manuel Prado.
Eduardo Caballero Calderón	CdA*	December 23, 1939	April 4, 1940	Recognised on December 23, 1939.
Eduardo Restrepo Sáenz	AEP	April 4, 1940	January 17, 1941	Second ambassador to Peru. He was named on February 22.
Luis López de Mesa	-	September 1941	September 1941	Official guest of the Peruvian government.
Francisco José Chaux	AEP	January 17, 1942	1943	Third ambassador to Peru. He presented his credentials on January 17.
Ignacio Ortiz Lozano	CdA*	1943	December 23, 1943	Started as secretary.
Ramón Santodomingo Vila	-	1943	1943	Invited by the Peruvian government.
Eduardo Zuleta Ángel	AEP	December 23, 1943	1947	Named on December 23.
Carlos Echeverri Cortés	AEP	July 16, 1947	November 16, 1949	Sixth ambassador to Peru.
Evaristo Sourdis	A*	July 28, 1956	July 28, 1956	Sent to attend the inauguration of Manuel Prado
Diego Uribe Vargas	AEP	1973	1973	
Luis Guillermo Grillo	AEP	March 1996	1999	Grillo was one of three Colombians (the other being his wife and UNESCO representative Patricia Uribe) who avoided the Japanese embassy hostage crisis, with the couple leaving the residence fifteen minutes before the assault due to their participation in a meeting at the Apostolic Nunciature to Peru.
Álvaro Pava Camelo	AEP	January 30, 2006	July 31, 2009	
María Claudia Mosquera Jaramillo	AEP	2009	2011	
Jorge Visbal Martelo	AEP	February 2, 2011	March 14, 2012	
Luis Eladio Pérez	AEP	September 14, 2012	2013	
María Elvira Pombo Holguín	AEP	November 1, 2013	November 27, 2017	
Mónica Lanzetta Mutis	AEP	January 31, 2018	2018	
María Claudia Mosquera Jaramillo	AEP	December 14, 2018	December 2022	
Gloria Arias Nieto	AEP	N/A	N/A	Designated in 2022, but did not take office.
Eufracio Morales	CdA	N/A	Incumbent	Head of mission of the Colombian embassy since Mosquera's departure in 2022.

== See also ==
- Colombia–Peru relations
- List of ambassadors of Peru to Colombia
