= Jorge Visbal Martelo =

Colombian politician, livestock and landowner and convicted criminal

Colombian ambassador to Peru
- In office 2 February 2011 – 14 March 2012
- President: Juan Manuel Santos Calderón
- Preceded by: María Claudia Mosquera Jaramillo
- Succeeded by: Luis Eladio Pérez Bonilla

Senator of Colombia
- In office 3 June 2007 – 29 May 2009
- Preceded by: Luis Guillermo Vélez Trujillo

Colombia Ambassador to Canada
- In office 2 September 2004 – September 2005
- President: Álvaro Uribe Vélez
- Preceded by: Fanny Kertzman Yankelevitch
- Succeeded by: Jaime Girón Duarte

Personal details
- Born: 26 June 1953 (age 73) Corozal, Sucre, Colombia
- Party: Party of the U (2006-present)
- Education: Externado University (BBA, 1983)

Jorge Aníbal Visbal Martelo (born 26 June 1953) is a Colombian politician, livestock and landowner, and convicted criminal.

Visbal Martelo was the president of the Colombian Association of Stockbreeders between 1991 and 2004. He was found guilty of collaboration and conspiracy with paramilitary groups between 1998 and 2005 for the promotion and expansion of this army.

== Ambassador to Canada ==
On 13 July 2004, President Álvaro Uribe Vélez appointed Visbal as Ambassador of Colombia to Canada. He was sworn in on July 16,

== Senator of Colombia ==
In late 2005 it was announced that Ambassador Visbal would resign to run for Congress in the 2006 legislative elections, but fail to earn a seat in Congress. In 2007 however, following the death of Senator Luis Guillermo Vélez Trujillo a Party of the U politician, Visbal was selected by the party to replace him in Congress as a Senator of Colombia.

== Ambassador to Peru ==
He served as ambassador to Peru between 2010 and 2012 by appointment of President Juan Manuel Santos Calderón. He was sworn in on January 21, 2011. In March 2012 he stepped down due to pre-trial detention on charges for conspiracy to commit crimes in association with right-wing paramilitary groups.

== Conviction ==
Visbal Martelo was found guilty of conspiracy to commit crimes in association with paramilitary groups in June 2018 and sentenced to nine years in prison and a fine.
