= List of ambassadors of Colombia to Venezuela =

Ambassador of Colombia
- Ministry of Foreign Affairs; Embassy of Colombia, Caracas
- Style: His or Her Excellency (formal); Mr. or Madam Ambassador (informal)
- Reports to: Minister of Foreign Affairs
- Residence: Quinta Colombia
- Seat: Caracas, Venezuela
- Appointer: President of Colombia
- Term length: At the pleasure of the president
- Formation: December 16, 1823
- Website: Colombian Embassy - Caracas

The ambassador of Colombia to Venezuela (known formally as the ambassador of the Republic of Colombia to the Bolivarian Republic of Venezuela) is the ambassador extraordinary and plenipotentiary of the Republic of Colombia to Venezuela, in the following is a list of ambassadors of Colombia, or other chiefs of mission, to Venezuela and its predecessor states. The title given by the Ministry of Foreign Affairs to this position is currently Ambassador Extraordinary and Minister Plenipotentiary.

== Republic of Venezuela ==
Representative	Title	Presentation of credentials	Termination of mission	Appointed by
Pedro Gómez Barrero	Envoy Extraordinary	August 20, 1987	June 22, 1990	Virgilio Barco
Noemí Sanín		June 22, 1990	November 8, 1991	César Gaviria
Rodrigo Pardo		August 28, 1992	May 7, 1993	César Gaviria
Alberto Casas Santamaría		April 28, 1993	May 19, 1994	César Gaviria
Francisco Posada		April 28, 1994	May 19, 1996	Ernesto Samper
Guillermo Gónzalez		April 28, 1996	May 19, 1998	Ernesto Samper
Mario Suárez		April 28, 1997	May 19, 1998	Ernesto Samper

== Bolivarian Republic of Venezuela ==
Representative	Title	Presentation of credentials	Termination of mission	Appointed by
Luis Guillermo Giraldo	Chargé d'Affaires	May 19, 1998	September 19, 1999	Andrés Pastrana
Germán Bula Escobar	Envoy Extraordinary	April 20, 2000	August 18, 2002	Andrés Pastrana
María Ángela Holguín	Chargé d'Affaires			Álvaro Uribe
Enrique Vargas	Envoy Extraordinary			Álvaro Uribe
Fernando Marín	Envoy Extraordinary			Álvaro Uribe
María Luisa Chiappe	Envoy Extraordinary			Álvaro Uribe
José Fernando Bautista	Chargé d'Affaires			Juan Manuel Santos
Carlos Cure	Chargé d'Affaires			Juan Manuel Santos
Luis Eladio Pérez	Chargé d'Affaires			Juan Manuel Santos
Ricardo Lozano				Juan Manuel Santos
Armando Benedetti	Chargé d'Affaires	August 24, 2022	July 19, 2023	Gustavo Petro

== See also ==
- Colombia–Venezuela relations
- Foreign relations of Venezuela
