= Marulanda =

Marulanda is a Spanish and Basque surname, it is mostly used in Spain and Colombia. It may refer to:

== Surname ==
- Albalucía Ángel Marulanda, Colombian writer and novelist
- Carlos Arturo Marulanda, Colombian politician
- Fabián Marulanda López, Colombian Roman Catholic bishop
- Gustavo Giron Marulanda, Australian-Colombian footballer
- Ivan Marulanda Gomez, Colombian politician
- Lina Marulanda, Colombian television personality and model
- Manuel Marulanda Velez, Colombian FARC commander
- María Isabel Mejía Marulanda, Colombian politician
- Víctor Hugo Marulanda, Colombian footballer
- Victoriana Mejía Marulanda, Colombian diplomat

== Places ==
- Marulanda, Gipuzkoa, Pais Vasco, a town in Spain
- Marulanda, Caldas, a town and municipality in Colombia
