= Lalo (given name) =

Lalo is a masculine given name. Notable people with this given name include:

- Lalo Barrubia (born 1967), Uruguayan writer, performer and translator María del Rosario González
- Lalo Hartich (1904–1979), Argentine actor
- Lalo Mir (born 1952), Argentine radio host
- Lalo Ríos (1927–1973), Mexican-born American actor
- Lalo Rodríguez (born 1958), stage name of Puerto Rican salsa singer and musician Ubaldo Rodríguez Santos
- Lalo Schifrin (1932–2025), Argentine pianist, composer, arranger, and conductor

== See also ==
- Lalo (disambiguation)
- Lalo (nickname)
- Lalo (surname)
