= Lalo =

Lalo may refer to:

== Places ==
- Lalo, Benin, a town
- Lalo, Tokelau, an island in the South Pacific
- Lalo railway station, Lalo subdistrict, Thailand

== People ==
- Lalo (given name)
- Lalo (nickname)
- Lalo (surname)

== Other uses ==
- Lalo language, Chinese language cluster
- Lalo (restaurant), a restaurant in Mexico City
- Lalo Salamanca, a fictional character in Better Call Saul
- Lalo, a fictional character in the 2007 animated film Ratatouille

== See also ==
- Lalo = Brilliance, 1962 Lalo Schifrin album
- Lallo (disambiguation)
- Lalo-Honua, Hawaiian mythological figure
