= Pedro M. Oliveira =

Peruvian politician (1882–1958)

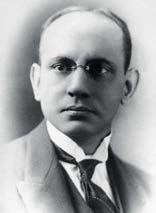

Minister of Public Instruction
- In office December 8, 1939 – April 28, 1943
- Preceded by: Ernesto Montagne
- Succeeded by: Lino Cornejo

Minister of Foreign Affairs
- In office March 6, 1930 – August 24, 1930
- Preceded by: Pedro J. Rada
- Succeeded by: Julio Goicochea

Minister of Justice, Instruction, Worship and Charity
- In office December 9, 1926 – March 6, 1929
- Preceded by: Alejandrino Maguiña
- Succeeded by: Matías León Carrera

Personal details
- Born: October 15, 1882 Lima
- Died: June 18, 1958 Buenos Aires
- Spouse: Maria Amelia Lawezzari
- Children: Jose Oliveira Lawezzari; Rosa Oliveira Lawezzari
- Education: San Marcos University
- Membership: Club Nacional

Pedro Máximo Oliveira Sayán (Lima; October 15, 1882 — Buenos Aires; June 18, 1958) was a Peruvian lawyer, jurist, professor, diplomat and politician. He served as Minister of Justice, Instruction, Worship and Charity (1926–1929), Minister of Foreign Affairs (1930), rector of the University of San Marcos (1941–1946) and Minister of Public Instruction (1939–1943). He promoted the educational reform of 1941.

== Biography ==
He completed his basic studies at the Colegio de la Inmaculada, run by Jesuit priests. He then entered the Universidad Nacional Mayor de San Marcos (UNMSM; 1900-1905). He graduated with a bachelor's degree in Political and Administrative Sciences (1902) and in Jurisprudence (1903). He received a doctorate in Jurisprudence and qualified as a lawyer in 1905.

He began his teaching career at the UNMSM's Law School (1908), as a professor of Philosophy of Law, Civil Law (monographic course), History of Peruvian Law and Roman Law.

He began his political activism in the National Democratic or "futurist" Party, founded by José de la Riva-Agüero y Osma, in which Julio C. Tello was also a member. But he began to sympathize with the figure of Augusto B. Leguía, who in 1919 came to power through a successful coup d'état.

In February 1916 he married Maria Amelia Lawezzari.

From 1920 to 1922, under the second government of Augusto B. Leguía, he served as minister plenipotentiary in Colombia, a period under which the controversial Salomón-Lozano Treaty was signed in Lima, which resolved the Colombian-Peruvian territorial dispute.

In 1922 he became a member of the commission to reform the Civil Code, along with Manuel Augusto Olaechea, Alfredo Solf y Muro and Hermilio Valdizán (all of them professors from San Marcos), and Juan José Calle, prosecutor of the Supreme Court. This reform work lasted until 1936, when the new Civil Code was promulgated, which replaced that of 1852.

He was dean of the Lima Bar Association (1924-1925) and representative of Peru before the government of Bolivia (1925-1926).

On December 9, 1926, he was sworn in as Minister of Justice, Instruction, Worship and Charity. In this capacity, he issued the university statute of July 25, 1928, which suppressed university autonomy, alleging that it was only an instrument for universities to were dominated by minorities. Maximum authority over the universities was handed over to a National Council of University Education made up of the Minister of Education, four government delegates, four from the universities and a student delegate (the latter was never elected). This council elected rectors, enforced laws and regulations, and resolved doubts.

Oliveira left the position of minister on March 6, 1929. He chaired the Instruction Commission of his chamber.

On March 6, 1930, he was appointed Minister of Foreign Affairs, replacing Pedro José Rada y Gamio. He signed the boundary protocol with Chile and inaugurated the Pan American Children's Conference. He was Leguía's last chancellor, until the coup d'état of August 24 of the same year.

In 1933 he was a member of the advisory commission on Foreign Relations.

At the University of San Marcos he was dean of the Faculty of Law (1935-1941), vice-rector (1936-1941) and rector (1941-1946). He was one of the founders of the Revista de Derecho y Ciencia Política, along with Alberto Ulloa Sotomayor, Ángel Gustavo Cornejo, Juan Bautista de Lavalle y García, Jorge Basadre and Manuel Abastos (1936).

During the first government of Manuel Prado Ugarteche, he was Minister of Public Instruction (from December 8, 1939 to April 28, 1943), and as such, he promoted educational reform, through the organic law of public education of April 1, 1941. This was done through the so-called "delegated legislation", which is when Congress allows technical commissions to prepare laws of a specialized nature and omits to enter into the detailed discussion of them.

He died on June 18, 1958.

== Selected works ==
He is the author of numerous academic works, be they legal, historical, sociological, educational, etc.

- Nuestro código civil no se armoniza con los principios económicos (1903)
- La política económica de la metrópoli (Lima, Imprenta La Industria, 1905).
- Estudios sociales (Bogotá, Editorial de Cromos, 1921).
- Anteproyecto de ley orgánica de Educación (Lima, 1940).

== Family ==
One of Oliveira's three sons and fellow National Club member, Jose Oliveira Lawezzari, married Ingrid Schwend, daughter of former SS member Friedrich Schwend, with whom he had two daughters. The marriage became the focus of a highly-publicised murder trial that lasted from May to July 1965 after Schwend voluntarily confessed to local law enforcement that she fatally shot José Manuel de Sartorius y Bermúdez de Castro on the night of December 14, 1963, claiming self-defence.

According to Schwend, represented by Senator David Aguilar Cornejo, she had been pursued by Sartorius in his white Morris Mini-Minor while she was driving her cherry Buick late at night, returning from a date with a lawyer despite being married. After she stepped out of her vehicle, he forced himself on her, after which she pulled out a handgun from her purse and shot the alleged stranger up to six times.

This version of events was challenged by Raúl Peña Cabrera, who represented Olenka Dudek, a Polish-Peruvian socialite and widow of Sartorius. He claimed that both parties had scheduled a date and that Oliveira had shot Sartorius out of jealousy, despite the couple's open marriage. This version of events was also shared by the Peruvian Investigative Police (PIP), but opposed by the general public, who overwhelmingly supported Schwend's story. Schwend was ultimately found guilty, with her husband being ordered to pay Sartorius' widow S/. 40,000, and sentencing her to five years in prison, which were decreased to three for her good conduct, after which she divorced her husband.

== See also ==
- Augusto B. Leguía

== Bibliography ==
- Basadre, Jorge (2005a). Historia de la República del Perú. 7.º periodo: El Oncenio (1919-1930) (in Spanish). Vol. 14 (9th ed.). Lima: Empresa Editora El Comercio S. A. ISBN 9972-205-76-2.
- ——— (2005b). Historia de la República del Perú. 8.º periodo: El comienzo de la irrupción de las masas organizadas en la política (1930-1933) (in Spanish). Vol. 15 (9th ed.). Lima: Empresa Editora El Comercio S. A. ISBN 9972-205-77-0.
- ——— (2005c). Historia de la República del Perú: 8.º periodo: El comienzo de la irrupción de las masas organizadas en la política (1930-1933) (in Spanish). Vol. 16 (9th ed.). Lima: Empresa Editora El Comercio S. A. ISBN 9972-205-78-9.
- Gálvez Montero, José Francisco; García Vega, Enrique Silvestre (2016). Historia de la Presidencia del Consejo de Ministros. Tomo I (1820-1956) (PDF) (1st ed.). Lima: Empresa Peruana de Servicios Editoriales S.A. ISBN 978-87-93429-87-1. Archived from the original (PDF) on 2020-11-04.
- Guerra, Margarita (1984). Historia General del Perú. La República Contemporánea (1919-1950). Vol. 12 (1st ed.). Lima: Editorial Milla Batres.

| Preceded by Carlos Monge Medrano | Rector of the University of San Marcos; 1941–1946 | Succeeded by Godofredo García |
