= Eladio =

Eladio or Eládio is a given name, the Spanish equivalent of Helladius. Notable people with that name include.

== Entertainment ==
- Eládio Clímaco (born 1941), Portuguese television presenter
- Eladio Lárez (born 1941), Venezuelan businessperson and TV presenter
- Eladio Martínez (born 1912), Paraguay musician
- Eladio Rodríguez (1864–1949), Spanish writer
- Eladio Romero Santos (born 1937), Dominican musician
- Eladio Torres (born 1950), Puerto Rican composer
- Eladio Vélez (1897–1967), Colombian painter
- Eladio Carrión (born 1994), Puerto Rican rapper/singer
- Don Eladio Vuente, a fictional character in Breaking Bad and Better Call Saul

== Politics ==
- Eladio Jala (born 1949) Filipino politician
- Eladio Loizaga (born 1949), Paraguayan diplomat
- Eladio Pérez (1956–2008), Dominican politician
- Eladio Victoria (1864–1939), Dominican politician
- Luis Eladio Pérez, Colombian politician

== Religion ==
- Eladio Acosta Arteaga (1916–2012), Colombian Roman Catholic bishop
- Eladio Vicuña Aránguiz (1911–2008), Chilean Roman Catholic bishop
- Eladio of Toledo (died 633), Christian archbishop

== Sports ==
- Eladio Benítez (1939–2018), Uruguayan footballer
- Eladio Campos (born 1936), Mexican racewalker
- Eladio Fernández (born 1986), Spanish footballer
- Eladio Herrera (boxer) (born 1930), Argentine boxer
- Eladio Herrera (footballer) (born 1984), Chilean footballer
- Eladio Jiménez (born 1976), Spanish cyclist
- Eladio Reyes (born 1948), Peruvian footballer
- Eladio Rodriguez (born 1979), Dominican baseball player
- Eladio Rojas (1934–1991), Chilean footballer
- Eladio Rosabal Cordero (1894–1965), Costa Rican footballer
- Eladio Sánchez (born 1984), Spanish cyclist
- Eladio Silvestre (born 1940), Spanish footballer
- Eladio Valdés (1905–1933), Cuban boxer
- Eladio Vallduvi (born 1950), Spanish sport shooter
- Eladio Vaschetto, Argentine footballer
- Eladio Zárate (1942–2026), Paraguayan footballer

== Other ==
- Eladio Dieste (1917–2000), Uruguayan engineer and architect
- Don Eladio Sauza (1883–1946), Mexican businessman
- Eladio Zorrilla Jiménez, known as Elady Zorrilla (born 1990), Spanish footballer

== See also ==
- Lalo (nickname)
