= Friedrich Schwend =

German spy (1906–1980)

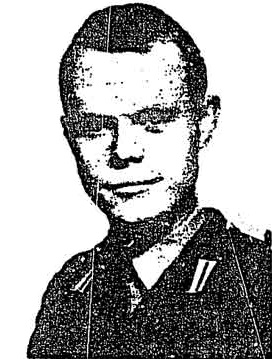
- Born: November 6, 1906; Böckingen, Heilbronn, Germany
- Died: March 28, 1980 (aged 73); Lima, Peru
- Other names: See list: Dr. Fritz Wendig; Flush; Major Klemp; Fritz Klemp; Wenceslau Turi
- Spouse: Agnes von Gemmingen-Guttenberg (m. 1929; div. 1939) Hedda Neuhold (m. 1940)
- Children: Ingrid Schwend de Oliveira (b. 1936)
- Awards: Iron Cross, 2nd Class
- Espionage activity
- Allegiance: Germany; United States
- Service branch: Schutzstaffel: Abwehr; RSHA; United States Army: Army CIC
- Service years: 1939–1945; 1945–1946
- Rank: Sturmbannführer

Friedrich Paul Schwend (November 6, 1906 — March 28, 1980), later known as Federico Schwend, was a German SS-Sturmbannführer who participated as the sales manager of Operation Bernhard during World War II under the control of the Reich Security Main Office (RSHA).

After the war, he moved to Peru, where he was brought to public attention after his daughter became the subject of a highly publicised murder trial in 1963, and again in 1972, when it was discovered that he secretly harboured fellow SS member Klaus Barbie at his private residence located at Malecon 200, Chaclacayo.

== Early life ==
Schwend (also spelled Schwendt) was born on November 6, 1906, in Böckingen, a borough of the Swabian city of Heilbronn. In the 1930s, he married Baroness Agnes von Gemmingen-Guttenberg, the niece of then Foreign Minister Konstantin von Neurath whom Schwend, while working at a petrol station, had met in 1929. Through his wife's connections with the Bunge family (specifically, her wife's aunt, "one of the Bunge sisters"), he started working in Bunge & Born, where he earned US$50,000 yearly.

In 1932, he joined the Nazi Party and was named at the front of Bunge & Born in Los Angeles, participating in several parties in Hollywood. He started corresponding with Marshal Hermann Göring, with whom he shared a passion for aircraft, after he caught his attention through his repeated letters that criticised the Party's economic policies. In Los Angeles, he befriended German consul Georg Gyssling. He later moved to Woodside, Queens, a neighbourhood that had a small German colony at the time, where he assisted German rearmament by importing arms from China and the Balkans. In 1938, he was sent to Italy, where he would purchase food and other materials for export to Germany. During the latter period, he lived at the beach-side Villa de Nevoso in Abbazia.

Schwend also traveled to the Soviet Union, Persia and South America to conduct trade deals or explore trade opportunities for the Reich.

== World War II ==
In 1939, with the start of World War II in Europe, his wife divorced him, and he left the company. He then started working for the financial section of the Abwehr under Wilhelm Canaris for a couple of months, marrying his secretary and fellow Nazi Party member (specifically the National Socialist Women's League), Hedda Neuhold, in Trieste. In 1942, he was detained by the Gestapo after he attempted to sell counterfeit submarine blueprints to two British agents, with Willi Gröbl, an acquaintance who worked for the SS, intervening in his favour.

In 1943, on the recommendation of Wilhelm Höttl, he became head of sales of counterfeit foreign currency; The official name of the office was Sonderstab Generalkommando III Germanisches Panzerkorps. Schwend received the rank of SS-Sturmbannführer, was subordinate to Ernst Kaltenbrunner and reported directly to Heinrich Himmler. Schwend was able to keep a third of the counterfeit currency, but he had to use it to entertain his negotiators. Among them, Alberto Crastan, Georg Gyssling and Jaac van Harten.

The counterfeit currency made by Schwend's group eventually became used to purchase arms, munitions and other supplies. In Croatia, Schwend was struck by a bullet after falling behind enemy lines and being ambushed by Yugoslav Partisans. Nevertheless, he managed to escape and received the Iron Cross, Second Class, and the honorific rank of Panzer Division Major. Willi Gröbl, who was killed in the attack, posthumously received the same award, First Class.

== Post-war years ==
At the end of the war, he was ordered to go from his base of operations at Schloss Labers in Merano, northern Italy, to the nearby Austrian mountains. Following the end of the war, Schwend surrendered to American troops in Tyrol on May 12, 1945. He revealed his hiding places in Austria and South Tyrol; The gold he found alone was worth US$200,000. From 1945 to 1946, Schwend worked as an informant for the Counterintelligence Corps (CIC) after volunteering himself to the CIC's detachment in Innsbruck. He was investigated by the CIC, who codenamed him Flush due to him serving as an agent to "flush out" other former SS members in Europe, and was put in charge of an intelligence network in the Balkans and Czechoslovakia. In 1945, he joined the Gehlen Org, and in 1946 he escaped to Peru via one of the so-called ratlines.

Thanks to a Red Cross passport issued under a false name, Schwend arrived with his family as an immigrant to the port of Callao in 1947, where he hispanicised his first name. He moved to a large gated house in the neighbourhood of Santa Clara, located in the 17th kilometre of the Central Highway, where he lived with his wife Hedda and daughter Ingrid, and was known by locals as "our Nazi." Schwend had opened a restaurant in Chaclacayo, which had proven successful, although he was also reportedly involved in money counterfeiting, drug trafficking and arms dealing. Schwend's ex-wife later moved to South Africa, returning briefly for her daughter's trial that lasted from May to July 1965.

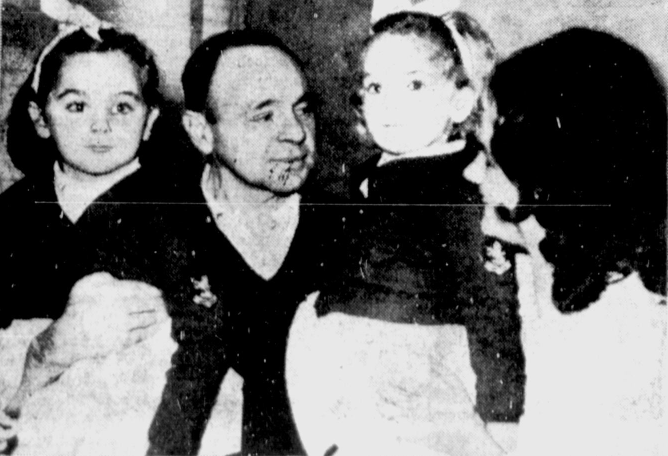
The Schwend family during the trial.

In 1963, his daughter Ingrid became the focus of a highly publicised trial after she voluntarily confessed to local law enforcement that she fatally shot Spaniard José Manuel de Sartorius y Bermúdez de Castro (Spain; c. 1934 – Lima; December 14, 1963) on the night of December 14, 1963, claiming self-defense. The media frenzy surrounding the scandalous high-profile nature of the trial and the repeated appearances of Schwend at the courthouse brought him to public attention throughout the entirety of the process, which ended with the court finding Mrs. Oliveira guilty and ordering her husband, José Oliveira Lawezzari (the son of politician Pedro M. Oliveira, with whom she had two daughters: Gloria and Diana, then five and three-years-old, respectively), to pay Sartorius' widow, Olenka Dudek, S/. 40,000, and sentencing her to five years in prison, which were decreased to three for her good conduct, after which she divorced her husband.

In 1972, Schwend was detained in connection to the murder of businessman Luis Banchero Rossi. A few days later, it was discovered that Schwend had given refuge to Klaus Barbie—who had been using the name Altmann—at his residence in Santa Clara. Schwend had been working with Barbie in Peru, with both men presumably having links to the Peruvian Investigative Police, prior to the discovery. After Barbie's identity was confirmed through photographs taken of him by Le Monde photographer Nicole Bonnet at San Martín Square after an interview at Schwend's house carried out by AFP correspondent Albert Brun, Barbie left for Bolivia, being later extradited to France where he died in 1991.

Although Schwend was cleared in the 1972 murder, he spent two years in prison in Peru for smuggling. He was deported to West Germany in 1976, where he was given a two-year suspended sentence for the murder of one of his agents in Italy during the war, for which he had received a 21-year suspended sentence from Italy. In 1979 he was again deported from Bonn where he returned to his normal life, dying in 1980.
