= Lalo (nickname) =

Lalo is a masculine nickname. It is a common nickname for Eduardo, Eladio, Gerardo, Wenceslao, and Gonzalo, according to Spanish naming customs. Notable people with this nickname include:

- Eduar Lalo Alcaraz (born 1964), Hispanic-American cartoonist
- Abelardo Delgado (1931–2004), Chicano writer, community organizer, and poet
- Eduardo Lalo Ebratt (born 1993), Colombian singer
- Eduardo Lalo Fernández (born 1992), Mexican footballer
- Gonzalo Lalo García (1971–2015), Spanish basketball player
- Eulalio González (1921–2003), Mexican actor, humorist, singer-songwriter, screenwriter, announcer, film director and film producer
- Eduardo Lalo Guerrero (1916–2005), Mexican-American guitarist, singer and farm labor activist
- Raúl Maradona (born 1966), Argentine former professional footballer
- Lalo Schifrin (1932–2025), Argentine-American pianist, composer, arranger and conductor
- Eduardo Gómez García-Barbón (born 1936), Spanish footballer
- Lalo Rodríguez, a ring name, along with Ciclón Negro, of professional wrestler Ramon Eduardo Rodriguez (1932–2013)
- Eduardo "Lalo" Salamanca, a fictitious drug lord from the TV series Better Call Saul

== See also ==
- Lalo (disambiguation)
- Lalo (given name)
- Lalo (surname)
