= Lalo (surname) =

Lalo is a surname. Notable people with the surname include:

- Bhai Lalo (1452–?), a person in Sikh history in Pakistan
- Charles Lalo (1877–1953), French writer
- Édouard Lalo (1823–1892), French composer
- Eduardo Lalo (born 1960, Puerto Rican novelist
- Eyal Lalo, president and CEO of Invicta Watch Group
- Pierre Lalo (1866–1943), French music critic and translator
- Tamar Lalo (born 1984), Israeli recorder player

== See also ==
- Lalo (disambiguation)
- Lalo (given name)
- Lalo (nickname)
