= Carlos Cure =

Carlos Cure Cure

Colombia Ambassador to Venezuela
- In office 5 August 2011 – 22 february 2013
- President: Juan Manuel Santos Calderón
- Preceded by: José Fernando Bautista Quintero

Personal details
- Born: 1944 (age 81–82) Sabanalarga, Atlántico, Colombia
- Spouse: Margaret Elizabeth Núñez Hughes (1983–present)
- Education: School of Mines of Medellín (BEng)
- Occupation: Businessman
- Profession: Civil engineer

Carlos Cure Cure (born 1944) is the Ambassador of Colombia to Venezuela. A civil engineer, Cure has also served as chair of Bavaria, S.A., the biggest brewery of Colombia and second largest in South America before its merger, and Avianca, S.A., the national flag carrier of Colombia.

== Personal life ==
The son of Syrian-Lebanese migrants, he was born in 1944 in Sabanalarga, Atlántico. On 6 February 1983 he married former beauty pageant contestant Margaret Elizabeth Núñez Hughes.

== See also ==
- Fuad Ricardo Char Abdala
- Juan Mayr Maldonado
