= Carlos Echeverri Cortés =

Colombian economist and diplomat

- Dr. Carlos Echeverri Cortes (left) with U.N. Secretary-General Trygve Lie (right), at U.N. Headquarters.

5th Permanent Representative of Colombia to the United Nations
- In office August 1952 – 5 March 1953
- President: Roberto Urdaneta Arbeláez
- Preceded by: Elíseo Arango Ramos
- Succeeded by: Evaristo Sourdis Juliao

27th Colombian Minister of Posts and Telegraphs
- In office 29 August 1951 – 29 April 1952
- President: Laureano Gómez Castro; Roberto Urdaneta Arbeláez
- Preceded by: José Tomás Angulo
- Succeeded by: Carlos Albornoz

6th Colombian Ambassador to Peru
- In office 16 July 1947 – 16 November 1949
- President: Mariano Ospina Pérez
- Succeeded by: Eduardo Zuleta Ángel

Colombian Ambassador to Mexico
- In office 1945 – 16 July 1947
- Preceded by: Jorge Zalamea Borda
- Succeeded by: Carlos Arango Vélez

Personal details
- Born: 23 June 1900 Bogotá, D.C., Colombia
- Died: 14 March 1974 (aged 73) Bogotá, D.C., Colombia
- Party: Conservative
- Spouse: Gloria Rodríguez García
- Education: University of London
- Profession: Economist

Carlos Echeverri Cortés (23 June 1900 – 14 March 1974) was a Colombian economist and diplomat who served as ad interim fifth Permanent Representative of Colombia to the United Nations, and as Ambassador of Colombia to Peru and Mexico. During his ambassadorship in Peru he became an enemy of the administration of President Manuel Arturo Odría Amoretti for granting political asylum to the politician Víctor Raúl Haya de la Torre, an action that drove the Peruvian Government to mount a five-year struggle harassing embassy staff and personnel, and forming a military blockade around the Colombian Embassy where Haya was housed, this because Lima had refused to grant safe conduct for Haya to leave the country and Ambassador Echeverri refused to give him up.

== Recognitions ==
- Order of the Aztec Eagle - Band (1949)

== See also ==
- Juan Carlos Echeverry Garzón
