= Colombia–Peru relations =

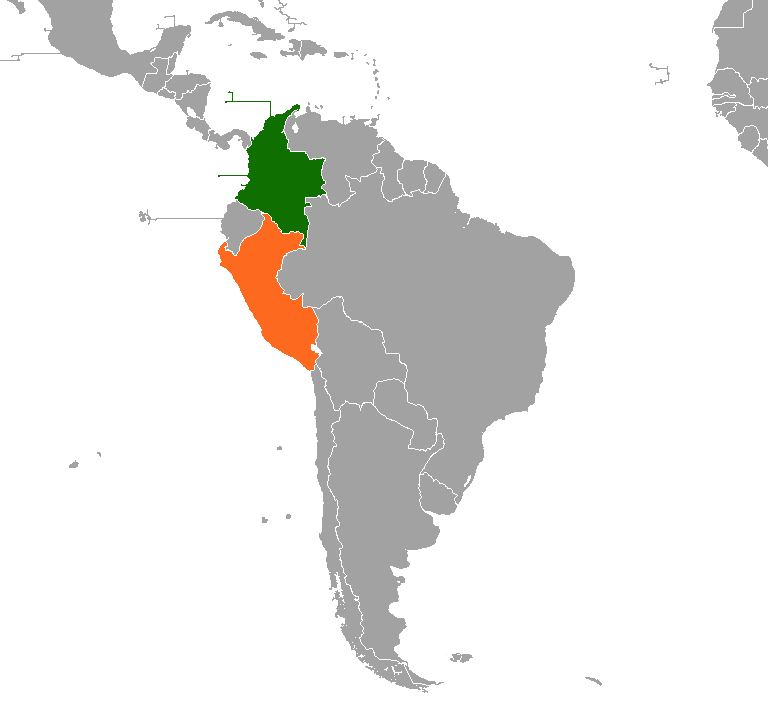
- Colombia: Peru

Diplomatic mission
- Embassy of Colombia, Lima: Embassy of Peru, Bogotá

Colombia–Peru relations are the bilateral relations between the Republic of Colombia and the Republic of Peru. Both nations are members of the World Trade Organization, Community of Latin American and Caribbean States, Lima Group, Organization of Ibero-American States, Organization of American States, Pacific Alliance and the United Nations.

== History ==
The two nations share a common heritage. Both countries were part of the Spanish Empire and have Spanish as their official language. Both countries participated in later Latin American wars of independence against Spain and achieved independence, forming Gran Colombia and Peru. However, since independence, the two countries have up-and-down relations.

=== Gran Colombia–Peru War ===
Two countries fought a bloody war from 1828 to 1829 over a territorial dispute. Both Peru and Gran Colombia had land claims over modern-day Ecuador, resulted with war and territorial claim. The war eventually ended with no significant territorial change, but Gran Colombia's collapse in 1831 led to the independence of Colombia, Venezuela and Ecuador. Thus, Peru's territorial dispute with Gran Colombia transferred to Ecuador.

=== Leticia dispute ===
Leticia, the city that lies in modern Colombia, was founded by the Peruvians, however the claim over the city only began in the late 19th century due to the losing pride post War of the Pacific. However, Colombia claimed that it had been Colombian since their Viceroyalty. This led to the Leticia War that happened for a year over territorial claim. This resulted with Colombianization of Leticia and Putumayo regions and expulsion of Peruvians.

=== Víctor Raúl Haya de la Torre ===
Víctor Raúl Haya de la Torre, a Peruvian diplomat aligned to left-wing American People's Revolutionary Alliance, gained sanctuary after his faction lost a one-day civil war in Peru on 3 October 1949 by the Colombian government granted him asylum. However, Peru rejected this action and it led to a standoff in relations.

Colombia maintained that according to the Conventions in force - the Bolivian Agreement of 1911 on Extradition, the Havana Convention of 1928 on Asylum, the Montevideo Convention of 1933 on Political Asylum - and according to American International Law, they were entitled to decide if asylum should be granted and their unilateral decision on this was binding on Peru. The submissions from Colombia was rejected by the International Court.

=== Internal conflicts ===
With both countries being plundered from the unstable situation in both sides since the 1960s, Colombian–Peruvian relations significantly improved. Colombia and Peru share a long and uncontrollable border, which prompted militia group like Shining Path and Revolutionary Armed Forces of Colombia to become active against the elitist government, and growing drug trafficking activities. In response, Colombia and Peru have cooperated in their battles against drug cartels and various militia groups.

Two countries also share similar threats from left wing terrorist groups, right wing terrorist paramilitaries, and its devastating war on drug cartels.

As both countries stand still in the same struggle, increasing collaboration is expected in the future and Peru had sought to use Colombia's FARC experience to battle the Shining Path.

== Immigration movement ==
Colombians formed at least 5% of population immigrating to Peru. Peruvians also formed a small immigrant group in Colombia.

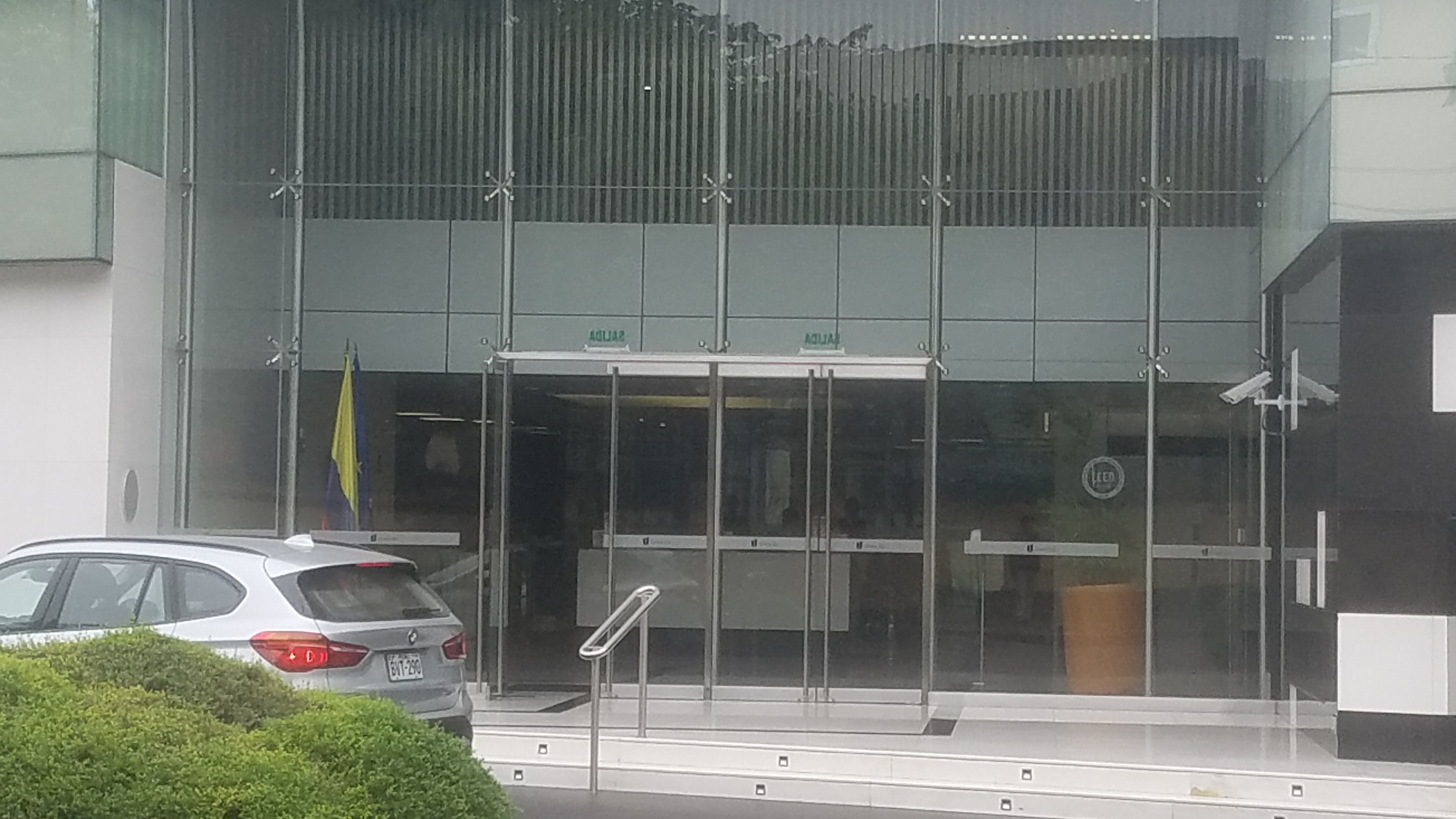
Embassy of Colombia in Lima

== Resident diplomatic missions ==
- Colombia has an embassy in Lima and a consulate in Iquitos.
- Peru has an embassy in Bogotá and consulates-general in Leticia and Medellín.

== See also ==
- List of ambassadors of Colombia to Peru
- List of ambassadors of Peru to Colombia
- Foreign relations of Colombia
- Foreign relations of Peru
