= Elíseo Arango Ramos =

Colombian politician

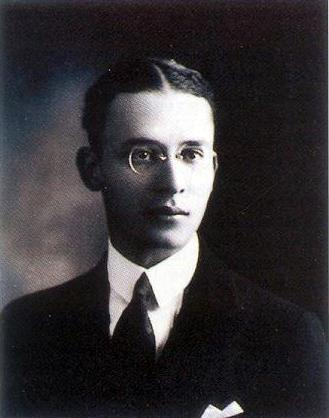
- 1923 photograph by Juan Nepomuceno Gómez.

4th Permanent Representative of Colombia to the United Nations
- In office 1950–1952
- President: Laureano Gómez Castro
- Preceded by: Fernando Londoño y Londoño
- Succeeded by: Carlos Echeverri Cortés

Colombian Minister of Foreign Affairs
- In office 1949–1950
- President: Mariano Ospina Pérez
- Preceded by: Eduardo Zuleta Ángel
- Succeeded by: Evaristo Sourdis Juliao

Personal details
- Born: 16 April 1900 Bagadó, Chocó, Colombia
- Died: 17 December 1977 (aged 77) Bogotá, D.C., Colombia
- Party: Conservative
- Spouse: Mercedes Roa Cervantes
- Education: Our Lady of the Rosary University; University of Paris
- Profession: Lawyer, Economist

Elíseo Arango Ramos (16 April 1900 – 17 December 1977) was a Colombian lawyer and diplomat who served as the fourth Permanent Representative of Colombia to the United Nations and as Minister of Foreign Affairs. A Conservative Party ideologue and politician, he was part of the far-right group known as "Los Leopardos" (The Leopards).
