= List of ambassadors of Peru to Colombia =

Ambassador of Peru to the Republic of Colombia
- Great Seal of Peru
- Incumbent; Vacant since March 2023
- Ministry of Foreign Affairs
- Appointer: The president of Peru
- Inaugural holder: José de Rivadeneyra
- Formation: 1822
- Website: Embassy of Peru in Colombia

The extraordinary and plenipotentiary ambassador of Peru to the Republic of Colombia is the official representative of the Republic of Peru to the Republic of Colombia.

Both countries established relations on June 6, 1822. Relations were initially amicable, although a territorial dispute soon led to conflict between both states. The first such conflict was the Gran Colombia–Peru War, being followed by skirmishes that would last almost a century after, culminating in the 20th century Battle of La Pedrera and the Colombia–Peru War, ultimately being resolved by the Salomón–Lozano Treaty and the 1934 Rio Protocol.

Today, relations remain amicable, and both countries cooperate in several international organizations.

== List of representatives ==
=== Gran Colombia (1822–1831) ===
Peru first sent representatives to Gran Colombia, including short-lived Guayaquil.

Name	Portrait	Term begin	Term end	President	Notes
José de Ribadeneira y Texada		1822	1822	José de San Martín	A General, he was named as Envoy Extraordinary and Minister Plenipotentiary by San Martín, who announced his choice to Simón Bolívar in Guayaquil. After Bernardo de Monteagudo's exile, the naming was left without effect.
Mariano Portocarrero		1823	March 18, 1823	José de la Riva-Agüero	A brigadier general, he was named as Minister Plenipotentiary on March 1, 1823, to solicit Bolívar's support. He presented his credentials on March 17 and retired the next day.
J. Francisco de Mendoza and Manuel de la Puente, 6th Marquess of Villafuerte		1823	1823	José de la Riva-Agüero	Sent to deliver Riva-Agüero's letter to Bolívar. They arrived to Guayaquil on April 26.
José Joaquín Olmedo and José Faustino Sánchez Carrión		August 1, 1823	August 7, 1823	José Bernardo de Tagle y Portocarrero	Named by Congress on June 19; credentials presented on August 1. They left Guayaquil for Peru on August 7, alongside Bolívar.
Ignacio Alcázar and J. J. de Salas		1823	1823	José Bernardo de Tagle y Portocarrero	Arrived to Guayaquil after Bolívar's had already departed.
José María Galeano		October 1823	December 1823	José Bernardo de Tagle y Portocarrero	As Minister Plenipotentiary; sent to negotiate a boundary agreement.
Juan Manuel Iturregui Aguilarte and Manuel Pérez de Tudela		1823	1823	José Bernardo de Tagle y Portocarrero	Designated from Trujillo by Riva-Agüero on August. After news reached them of Bolívar's departure. They did not travel to Guayaquil.
Manuel Bartolomé Ferreyros and Jerónimo Agüero		1825	April 1, 1826	Simón Bolívar	Agüero replaced Miguel Otero.
José María Pando and Manuel Lorenzo de Vidaurre		1826	1826	Simón Bolívar	Sent to the Congress of Panama. Pando was replaced by Manuel Pérez de Tudela.
Manuel Bartolomé Ferreyros		N/A	N/A	Simón Bolívar	Ferreyros was named as minister plenipotentiary on early June 1826, but did not take office.
Mariano Alejo Álvarez		N/A	N/A	Simón Bolívar	He was named on early June 1826, but was named to Chile instead on early August.
Gregorio Escobedo		1826	1827	Simón Bolívar	Sent to notify Bolívar of the adoption of his constitution.
José Villa		1827	June 3, 1828	Andrés de Santa Cruz	Was not officially received.
José de Larrea y Loredo		1829	November 7, 1829	José de La Mar	As minister plenipotentiary.
Eduardo Carrasco Toro and Modesto de la Vega		1830	1830	Agustín Gamarra	Sent to mark the boundary between Peru and Colombia. Carrasco was replaced by Colonel José Félix Castro.
Manuel I. del Burgo and Juan Evangelista de Yrigoyen y Zenteno		1830	1830	Agustín Gamarra	Sent in charge of a commission for debt settlement.

=== New Granada (1831–1863) ===
After the dissolution of Gran Colombia, Peru continued its relations with New Granada (as well as Venezuela and Ecuador), which was itself succeeded by the Granadine Confederation in 1858.

Name	Portrait	Term begin	Term end	President	Notes
Francisco Xavier Mariátegui		N/A	N/A	Agustín Gamarra	As minister plenipotentiary to Ecuador and Gran Colombia, sent to mediate the territorial dispute between both states. He presented his credentials in Quito on June 23, 1932, but did not manage to represent Peru to the latter country.
Manuel Lorenzo de Vidaurre		N/A	N/A	Andrés de Santa Cruz	Sent as minister plenipotentiary of the Peru–Bolivian Confederation to Ecuador and New Granada in 1838. He did not represent Peru to the latter country as he did not reach Bogotá.
José Maruri de la Cuba		N/A	N/A	Andrés de Santa Cruz	Named in September 1839 as minister plenipotentiary of the Peru–Bolivian Confederation to Ecuador, New Granada and Venezuela. The confederation was dissolved in 1839.
Santiago Távara Andrade		N/A	N/A	Agustín Gamarra	Named in 1840, he was to be sent to a mission in Colombia between Peru and Bolivia, but the outbreak of hostilities in 1841 put an end to his appointment and said talks.
?		1843	1843	Manuel Ignacio de Vivanco	An unnamed chargé d'affaires was named by Supreme Dictator Manuel Ignacio de Vivanco in 1843.
Francisco Xavier Mariátegui		N/A	N/A	Manuel Ignacio de Vivanco	Mariátegui was named as minister plenipotentiary in 1852, possibly in May. His appointment was left without effect.
Santiago Távara		1852	March 8, 1852	José Rufino Echenique	He signed two treaties regarding debt with Colombian Minister of Foreign Affairs José María Plata Soto.
José Gregorio Paz Soldán		1852	July 2, 1853	José Rufino Echenique	As minister plenipotentiary. He presented his credentials on May 25, 1853.
Pedro Gálvez Egúsquiza		August 5, 1856	July 23, 1858	Ramón Castilla	Minister plenipotentiary to Venezuela, as well as Central America and New Granada.
Buenaventura Seoane		1859	1860	Ramón Castilla	Resident minister plenipotentiary sent to avoid support for Ecuador during the first Ecuadorian–Peruvian War.
Juan Francisco Selaya		1861	1861	Ramón Castilla	As chargé d'affaires (a.i.); previously Zegarra's secretary.
José Antonio García y García		1862	February 9, 1865	Ramón Castilla	As chargé d'affaires.

=== Colombia (1863–2023) ===
The United States of Colombia succeeded New Granada in 1863, and eventually became the Republic of Colombia in 1886.

Name	Portrait	Term begin	Term end	President	Notes
Manuel Freyre		1866	May 1868	Mariano Ignacio Prado	As minister plenipotentiary. His son Manuel was also minister to Colombia in 1922.
Manuel María Rivas Pereira		1879	March 1880	Mariano Ignacio Prado	As minister plenipotentiary. He quit his post due to the War of the Pacific and enlisted in the Peruvian Army, participating during the defense of Lima.
Juan Luna		N/A	N/A	Nicolás de Piérola	He was minister plenipotentiary to Ecuador from February to December 1880. He was to be named as minister to Colombia, but was unable to take office.
Antonio D. Reyna		N/A	N/A	Miguel Iglesias	As resident minister in Ecuador, Colombia and Venezuela. He was appointed in 1884, but was unable to take office.
Emilio Bonifaz		N/A	N/A	Andrés Avelino Cáceres	He was appointed in 1887, but did not take office.
Luis Felipe Villarán		October 11, 1894	October 15, 1894	Andrés Avelino Cáceres	Sent to represent Peru in a border dispute conference.
J. Enrique Bustamante y Salazar		1898	November 30, 1898	Manuel Candamo	Named in 1895 as minister plenipotentiary.
Alberto Ulloa Cisneros		1901	June 10, 1902	Eduardo López de Romaña	As minister plenipotentiary; a permanent mission was established in Colombia from 1901.
Amador F. del Solar Cárdenas		1903	December 30, 1903	Eduardo López de Romaña	As minister plenipotentiary; he presented his credentials on July 13, 1903, having been appointed on February 6 of the same year.
José Santos Chocano		January 25, 1904	April 7, 1904	Manuel Candamo	As first secretary, then chargé d'affaires (a.i.)
Manuel de Freyre y Santander		April 7, 1904	October 17, 1904	Manuel Candamo	As secretary of the legation, then chargé d'affaires (a.i.)
Ernesto de Tezanos Pinto		1907	December 12, 1914	José Pardo y Barreda	As minister plenipotentiary.
Alejandro de la Fuente y de las Casas		1915	March 2, 1916	Óscar R. Benavides	As secretary of the legation, then chargé d'affaires (a.i.)
Enrique A. Carrillo		1916	February 23, 1918	José Pardo y Barreda	As secretary of the legation, then chargé d'affaires (a.i.)
Federico Elguera		1917	July 5, 1919	José Pardo y Barreda	As minister plenipotentiary; he presented his credentials on February 28, 1918. He quit after Augusto B. Leguía was chosen for the presidency of Peru.
Federico Elguera		August 7, 1918	August 7, 1918	José Pardo y Barreda	As Envoy Extraordinary on special mission to the transmission of command to His Excellency Mr. Marco Fidel Suárez. He was the first representative sent to such an event.
Enrique A. Carrillo		July 5, 1919	1919	José Pardo y Barreda	As secretary of the legation, then chargé d'affaires (a.i.).
Pedro M. Oliveira		1920	March 20, 1922	Augusto B. Leguía	As minister plenipotentiary.
Carlos Holguín de Lavalle		1922	July 7, 1922	Augusto B. Leguía	As legation secretary, then chargé d'affaires (a.i.).
Manuel de Freyre y Santander		June 1922	1924	Augusto B. Leguía	As minister plenipotentiary.
Manuel de Freyre y Santander		August 7, 1922	August 7, 1922	Augusto B. Leguía	As Ambassador Extraordinary on special mission to the transmission of command to His Excellency Mr. Pedro Nel Ospina.
Celso G. Pastor		1923	January 10, 1929	Augusto B. Leguía	As minister plenipotentiary. He was named on December 20, 1923, and presented his credentials on April 1 of the following year.
Celso G. Pastor		August 7, 1926	August 7, 1926	Augusto B. Leguía	Ambassador Extraordinary on special mission to the transmission of command to His Excellency Mr. Miguel Abadía Méndez.
Gonzalo Ulloa		April 1, 1929	July 10, 1929	Augusto B. Leguía	As legation secretary, then chargé d'affaires (a.i.).
Enrique A. Carrillo		1932	February 15, 1933	Luis Miguel Sánchez Cerro	As minister plenipotentiary.
Alejandro de la Fuente y de las Casas		N/A	N/A	Luis Miguel Sánchez Cerro	He was named on August 29, 1932. However, this designation was left without effect due to the rupture of diplomatic relations.
Giusseppe Gazzera		1933	1933	Benito Mussolini (Duce of Italy); Luis Miguel Sánchez Cerro (President of Peru)	Italian minister plenipotentiary to Colombia, in charge of Peruvian interests in Colombia, due to the aforementioned rupture of relations between Peru and Colombia due to Leticia War.
Víctor Manuel Maúrtua and Víctor Andrés Belaúnde and Alberto Ulloa Sotomayor		October 1933	May 1934	Augusto B. Leguía	As delegates plenipotentiary. They were sent to Rio de Janeiro in 1934, where they were signatories of the Rio Protocol on May 24, which upheld the Salomón–Lozano Treaty, signed between Colombian and Peruvian delegates Fabio Lozano Torrijos and Alberto Salomón Osorio in 1922.
Alfredo Correa Elías		1936	July 19, 1937	Óscar R. Benavides	As first secretary, then chargé d'affaires (a.i.).
Ricardo Rivera Schreiber		1937	May 12, 1938	Óscar R. Benavides	As minister plenipotentiary.
Pablo Abril de Vivero		1938	March 1, 1939	Óscar R. Benavides	As first secretary, then chargé d'affaires (a.i.).
Héctor Boza		August 7, 1938	August 7, 1938	Óscar R. Benavides	Minister of Public Works and Development, Ambassador Extraordinary in special mission special mission to the transmission of command to His Excellency Mr. Eduardo Santos.
Arturo García Salazar		1939	January 31, 1940	Óscar R. Benavides	First permanent ambassador.
Carlos Arenas y Loayza		1941	1945	Manuel Prado Ugarteche	Ambassador
Gonzalo N. de Arámburu		1946	1949	José Luis Bustamante y Rivero	Ambassador
Luis Alayza y Paz Soldán		1949	1952	Manuel A. Odría	Ambassador
José Félix Aramburú Salinas		1955	1958	Manuel Prado Ugarteche	Ambassador
Víctor Proaño		1959	1964	Manuel Prado Ugarteche	Ambassador
Gonzalo Pizarro		1964	1966	Fernando Belaúnde	Ambassador
Luis Fernán Cisneros		1966	1969	Fernando Belaúnde	Ambassador
Julio Vargas-Prada		1969	1971	Juan Velasco Alvarado	Ambassador
Alberto Wagner de Reyna		1972	1974	Juan Velasco Alvarado	Ambassador
Luis Barrios Llona		1975	1979	Francisco Morales Bermúdez	Ambassador
Antonio Belaúnde Moreyra		1980	1982	Fernando Belaúnde	Ambassador
Juan José Calle y Calle		1982	1985	Fernando Belaúnde	Ambassador
Javier Pulgar Vidal		1985	1986	Alan García	Ambassador
Alfredo Saco Miró Quesada		1986	1989	Alan García	Ambassador
Javier Pulgar Vidal		1989	1990	Alan García	Ambassador
Alfredo Ramos Suero		1990	1992	Alberto Fujimori	Ambassador
Alberto Montagne Vidal		1992	1997	Alberto Fujimori	Ambassador
Alejandro Gordillo Fernández		1997	2001	Alberto Fujimori	Ambassador
Harold Forsyth		2001	2004	Alejandro Toledo	Ambassador
José Luis Pérez Sánchez-Cerro		2005	2006	Alejandro Toledo	Ambassador
José Antonio Meier Espinosa		2006	2008	Alan García	Ambassador
Jorge Voto-Bernales Gatica		2009	2011	Alan García	Ambassador
Gustavo Lembcke Hoyle		2012	2013	Ollanta Humala	Ambassador
Néstor Popolizio		2013	2016	Ollanta Humala	Ambassador
Ignacio Higueras Hare		October 2016	February 2021	Pedro Pablo Kuczynski	Ambassador
Félix Ricardo Americo Antonio Denegri Boza		December 1, 2021	March 2023	Pedro Castillo	Ambassador; recalled in December 2022 and permanently retired in March 2023.

== See also ==
- List of ambassadors of Colombia to Peru
- List of ambassadors of Peru to Ecuador
- List of ambassadors of Peru to Venezuela
