= Maruebo railway station =

Railway station in Maruebo Tok, Thailand

Maruebo มะรือโบ
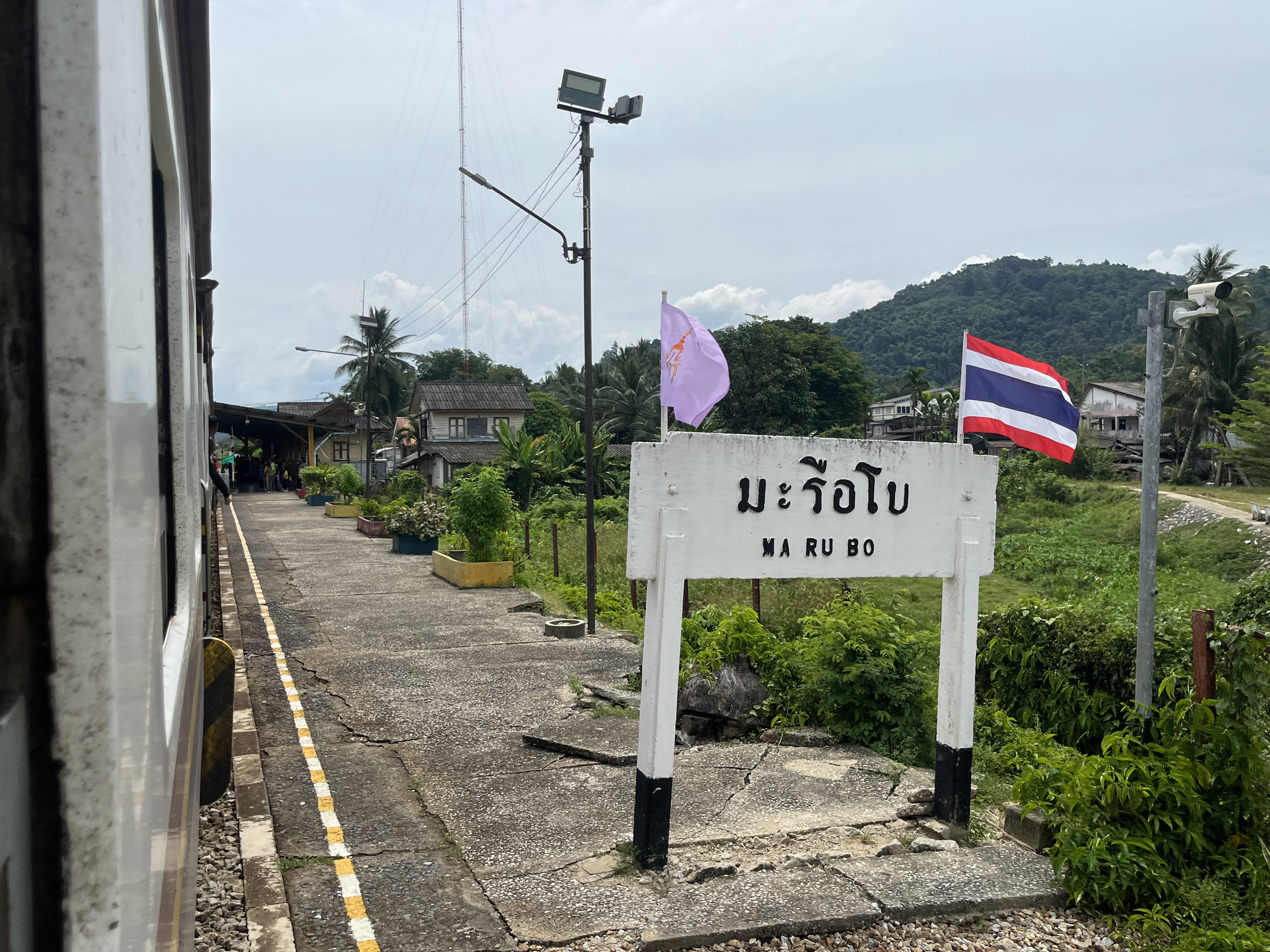

General information
- Location: Mu 1 (Ban Sathani Maruebo), Maruebo Tok Subdistrict, Ra-ngae District, Narathiwat
- Coordinates: 6.3348°N 101.6387°E
- Owner: State Railway of Thailand
- Line: Southern Line
- Platforms: 1
- Tracks: 2

Other information
- Station code: โบ.

Services
Preceding station	State Railway of Thailand	Following station
Lalo towards Hua Lamphong or Krung Thep Aphiwat	Southern Line	Kadae Halt towards Su-ngai Kolok
Location

Maruebo railway station is a railway station located in Maruebo Tok Subdistrict, Ra-ngae District, Narathiwat. It is a class 2 railway station located 1,089.467 km (677.0 mi) from Thon Buri railway station.

== South Thailand insurgency events ==
- On 15 November 2009, local No. 463 Phatthalung-Sungai Kolok was gunned by separatists 1 km from Maruebo railway station, causing one police officer to be injured. After inspection, 11 bullet holes were found on the locomotive, and 10 bullet holes on the first carriage (which was the guard's carriage). Later, a bomb was found near the shooting site and soldiers later disarmed it.
- On 27 July 2011, a one-metre track section between Maruebo-Tanyong Mat was destroyed by a separatist bomb, causing disruptions on the Yala-Sungai Kolok section for about 12 hours. No passengers were injured as no trains were running above the section at the time.

== Services ==
- Rapid No. 171/172 Bangkok-Sungai Kolok-Bangkok
- Rapid No. 175/176 Hat Yai Junction-Sungai Kolok-Hat Yai Junction
- Local No. 447/448 Surat Thani-Sungai Kolok-Surat Thani
- Local No. 451/452 Nakhon Si Thammarat-Sungai Kolok-Nakhon Si Thammarat
- Local No. 453/454 Yala-Sungai Kolok-Yala
- Local No. 463/464 Phatthalung-Sungai Kolok-Phatthalung
