= Lallo =

Lallo may refer to:

- Lallo, nickname of Spencer Asah, American Kiowa painter
- Anthony Di Lallo, Belgian footballer
- Lallo Gori, Italian composer and musician
- Moose Lallo, nickname of Morris G. Lallo, Canadian ice hockey player and coach
- Richard DiLallo, American author
- Lallo Peshawa, Kurdish, Norwegian producer
- Lal-lo, municipality in the Philippines

== See also ==
- Lalo (disambiguation)
