= Pedro José de Zavala, 7th Marquess of Valleumbroso =

Spanish-Peruvian nobleman and soldier

The Marquis of Valleumbroso
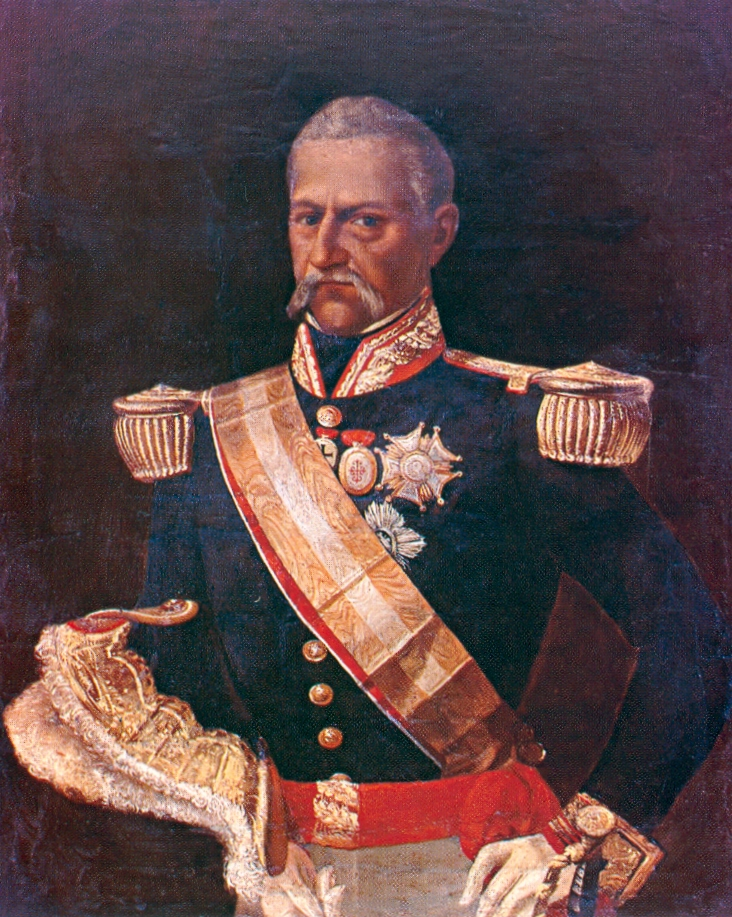
- Portrait of the Marquis of Valleumbroso

Personal details
- Born: Pedro José de Zavala y Bravo del Ribero; 10 August 1779 Lima, Viceroyalty of Peru, Spain
- Died: 20 June 1850 (aged 70) Lima, Peru
- Spouse(s): Grimanesa de la Puente y Bravo de Lagunas, Marquise of la Puente

Military service
- Allegiance: Spain
- Branch/service: Spanish Army
- Rank: Field marshal

Pedro José de Zavala y Bravo de Ribero, 7th Marquess of San Lorenzo del Valleumbroso, OIC, KOC (21 May 1779 – 20 January 1850), was a Spanish-Peruvian nobleman and soldier.

== Biography ==
Zavala was born in Lima into one of the most prominent families of the Viceroyalty of Peru. He was the son of Pedro Nolasco de Zavala y Pardo de Figueroa, 6th Marquess of Valleumbroso, and Ana Micaela Bravo del Ribero y Zavala.

He joined the Army in 1787 as cadet of the 3rd Regiment of the Dragoons Guards of Lima. In 1790, Zavala was commissioned into the Cavalry Regiment of the Nobility as ensign and was transferred to the Company of Dragoons of Queen María Luisa in 1797. In 1799, he returned to the Dragoons Guards of Lima, where was promoted to captain in 1804.

In 1812, Zavala created the King's Cavalry Company and was promoted to the rank of lieutenant colonel in the Royal Army. In 1819, he was appointed colonel of the Battalion of Spaniards. During the War of Independence, he defended the Callao, Chancay and Ancón ports in 1820 and 1821. Zavala supported the Aznapuquio mutiny that deposed the Viceroy and was commissioned to inform the King of the situation by the new viceroy José de la Serna. However, his mission was abruptly delayed since the brigantine Maypú in which Zavala was transported was captured by an Argentinian frigate in June 1821.

He settled down in Madrid. Joined to the Infante Don Carlos Regiment and afterwards the Battalion of Guías, he was awarded the Grand Cross of the Order of Isabella the Catholic for his services in Peru in 1822 and was appointed Gentilhombre de cámara con ejercicio by Fernando VII in 1824. Zavala was successively promoted to brigadier in 1826 and to field marshal in 1836. Next year, he was appointed second lieutenant of the Guard of Halberdiers (the Queen's guard), which he commanded from 1841 to 1843.

Zavala returned to Peru in 1849, to see his children who had remained there after supporting the Peruvian nationalists. He died the next year and, despite being a royalist himself, was buried with full military honours at Presbitero Maestro cemetery at the request of his remaining children, as some of them had died fighting for the nationalist side.

== Titles and decorations ==
- Order of Calatrava (1824)
- Order of Isabella the Catholic (1822)
- Royal and Military Order of Saint Hermenegild (1825)
- Laureate Cross of Saint Ferdinand (1830)
- Gentleman chamber exercise (1824)

== Marriage and issue ==
He married in 1804 Grimanesa de la Puente y Bravo, 4th Marchioness of Torreblanca, 5th Countess of Villaseñor and 2nd Marchioness of La Puente y Sotomayor, and had twelve children:

- Pedro de Zavala y la Puente, Peruvian soldier.
- Juan de Zavala, 1st Marquess of Sierra Bullones, Prime Minister of Spain.
- Toribio de Zavala y la Puente, Peruvian Army colonel.
- José de Zavala y la Puente, colonel prefect of Trujillo.
- Grimanesa de Zavala y la Puente, married to José Gregorio Paz Soldán.
- Andrés de Zavala y la Puente, stepfather of Manuel González Prada.
- Ana de Zavala y la Puente, 1st Marchioness of La Puente, married to Joaquín José de Osma.
