= Joaquín José de Osma =

Peruvian diplomat (1812 – 1899)

Joaquin Jose de Osma
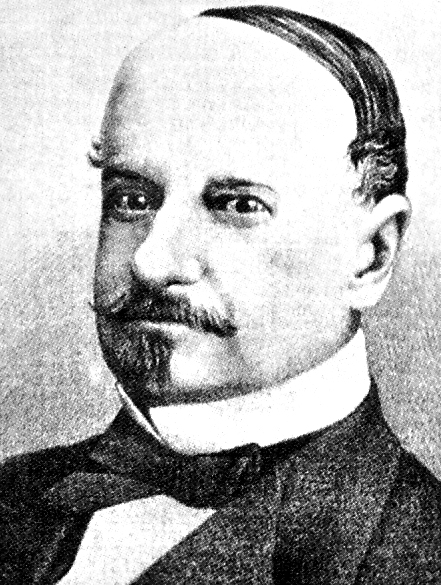

Minister of Foreign Affairs of Peru
- In office 5 February 1852 – 37 August 1852
- President: Jose Rufino Echenique
- Preceded by: Manuel Bartolomé Ferreyros
- Succeeded by: Bartholomew Herrera

President of the Chamber of Deputies of the Congress of the Republic of Peru
- In office 1851–1852
- President: Jose Rufino Echenique
- Preceded by: Bartholomew Herrera
- Succeeded by: Francisco Forcelledo

Personal details
- Born: Joaquín Domingo José Esteban de Osma y Ramírez de Arellano; 3 August 1812 Lima, Peru
- Died: 5 February 1896 (aged 83) Madrid, Spain
- Spouse: Ana Zavala y de la Puente (m. 1846)
- Children: 4
- Parents: Gasper Antonio de Osma y Tricio (father); Maria Josefa Ramirez de Arellano y Baquijano (mother)
- Profession: Lawyer; Diplomat

Joaquín Domingo José Esteban de Osma y Ramírez de Arellano (3 August 1812 – 5 February 1899) was a Peruvian diplomat. He served as Minister of Foreign Affairs in 1852 and as President of the Chamber of Deputies between 1851 and 1852. He also held the position of plenipotentiary minister in the United States, England, and Spain, the latter being the country where he ultimately settled. One of his daughters married Antonio Cánovas del Castillo. Through his marriage, he held the titles of Marqués de la Puente and De la Puente de Sotomayor.

== Life and work ==
Joaquín Domingo José Esteban de Osma y Ramírez de Arellano belonged to a prestigious family from Lima of colonial origin. His parents were Gaspar Antonio de Osma y Tricio, a magistrate of the Royal Audiencia of Lima, and María Josefa Ramírez de Arellano y Baquíjano, niece of José Baquíjano y Carrillo, an ideological precursor of Peru's independence.

As a minor, he was sent to Spain, where he completed his education and graduated as a lawyer. He returned to Peru in 1836 and joined the Lima Bar Association.

During Ramón Castilla's first constitutional government, he was sent to the United States as the head of the Peruvian diplomatic mission, where his brother Ignacio de Osma also served (1846). On February 9, 1848, he signed a "Treaty of Peace and Friendship, Commerce and Navigation" with the U.S. government, though it was not ratified by the Peruvian government.

Osma later represented Peru in England to address the country's debt incurred between 1822 and 1825 during the independence period. Amid the guano boom in Peru, British creditors demanded payment of the debt, which amounted to £3,736,400 (£1,816,000 in principal and £1,920,400 in interest). By a law enacted on March 10, 1848, Congress authorized the executive branch to settle the matter. On January 31, 1849, Osma negotiated a contract with bondholders of the 1823 and 1825 loans. On the same day, the Peruvian government signed a new guano export contract with the Gibbs House in the UK. Both contracts faced criticism for their opaque terms and, according to José Arnaldo Márquez, marked the beginning of Peru's financial turmoil, where the guano wealth benefited only a small elite. Osma was dismissed from his diplomatic post in 1850 and returned to Peru.

In 1851, he was elected deputy for the province of Canta and served as president of the chamber during the 1851–1852 legislative sessions. President José Rufino Echenique appointed him Minister of Foreign Affairs, a position he held from February 5 to August 7, 1852. Subsequently, he was sent to Madrid as plenipotentiary minister to the Spanish court.

On September 24, 1853, he signed a Treaty of Peace and Friendship with Spanish Minister Ángel Calderón de la Barca. In the treaty, Spain recognized Peru's independence, while Peru agreed to compensate Spanish citizens whose properties had been seized, confiscated, or embargoed since 1820. This treaty faced strong criticism in Peru, particularly from Foreign Minister José Gregorio Paz Soldán, who highlighted significant objections before submitting it to Congress. The primary concern was that the treaty began with Spain renouncing its sovereignty over Peru, implicitly disregarding Peru's independence. The treaty was not ratified by the Peruvian Congress, and the Spanish issue remained unresolved until 1879, following a war (1865–1866).

Osma remained head of the Peruvian mission in Madrid until Echenique was overthrown in early 1855. He stayed in Spain, where he secured the Order of Calatrava for his brother Gaspar José. He also supported the organization of the Sociedad General de Crédito Mobiliario Español, serving as president of its board of directors from 1856 to 1864. This institution was accused of speculating with Peruvian debt securities. Later, Osma became the father-in-law of the renowned Antonio Cánovas del Castillo when his daughter, Joaquina de Osma y Zavala, became the 1st Duchess of Cánovas del Castillo.

== Marriage and issue ==
On March 8, 1846, Joaquín José de Osma married Ana Zavala y de la Puente, daughter of the royalist Pedro José de Zavala, 7th Marquess of Valleumbroso and Grimanesa de la Puente y Bravo de Lagunas, Marquessa de la Puente y Sotomayor, 4th Marquessa de Torreblanca, and 5th Countess of Villaseñor. In 1861, his wife regained the title of Marquessa de la Puente y Sotomayor, which had belonged to her grandfather and conferred the status of Grandeza de España (Grandee of Spain). The couple had three daughters:

- Blanca Rosa Ana Joaquina de Osma y Zavala (1847–1871), married to Fernando Fernández de Córdoba y Álvarez de las Asturias-Bohorques, 7th Duke of Arión.
- Ana Ignacia María de Osma y Zavala, married to the politician Emilio Alcalá-Galiano, 4th Count of Casa Valencia and Grandee of Spain.
- Joaquina de Osma y Zavala, 1st Duchess of Cánovas del Castillo, married to the politician Antonio Cánovas del Castillo.

On 15th March1850, the Baptismal records for St Pancras (London), lists Joaquin Jose de Osma, occupation Gentleman, as the father to Jose De Osma Crowdy. The date of birth is 24 November 1849, mother is recorded as Frances Crowdy, the abode as Bridge St Vauxhall (London).

Preceded by Bartolomé Herrera	President of the Chamber of Deputies of the Congress of the Republic of Peru; 1851–1852	Succeeded by Francisco Forcelledo
Preceded by Manuel Bartolomé Ferreyros	Minister of Foreign Affairs of Peru; 5 February 1852 – 7 August 1852	Succeeded by Bartolomé Herrera (Interim)
