= María Isabel Mejía Marulanda =

Colombian politician and economist

Senator of Colombia
- In office 27 August 2008 – 20 July 2010
- Preceded by: Carlos Armando García Orjuela
- In office 25 November 2004 – 20 July 2006
- Preceded by: Ernesto Zuluaga Ramírez
- In office 20 July 2002 – 28 August 2004
- Succeeded by: Ernesto Zuluaga Ramírez

Member of the House of Representatives
- In office 20 July 1986 – 20 July 2002
- Constituency: Risaralda Department

11th Governor of Risaralda
- In office 1 January 1976 – 1 January 1977
- President: Alfonso López Michelsen
- Preceded by: Alberto Mesa Abadía
- Succeeded by: Carlos Arturo Ángel Arango

Mayor of Pereira
- In office 1 January 1975 – 1 January 1976
- President: Alfonso López Michelsen
- Preceded by: Octavio Mejía Marulanda
- Succeeded by: César Gaviria Trujillo

Personal details
- Born: 16 March 1945 (age 81) Pereira, Risaralda, Colombia
- Party: Party of the U (2005-present)
- Other political affiliations: Liberal (1977-2005)
- Relations: Victoriana Mejía Marulanda (sister)
- Education: Michigan State University (BA, MA)
- Profession: Economist

María Isabel Mejía Marulanda (born 16 March 1945) is a retired Colombian politician and economist. She served in Congress first as Representative for her home department of Risaralda from 1986 to 2002, and then as Senator from 2002 to 2006, and again in 2008 to 2010 in. A longtime Liberal party politician, she left the party in 2005 to form the Social Party of National Unity, a national political party formed by members of both mainstream parties in support of then President Álvaro Uribe Vélez.

== Political career ==
She first entered politics in 1975, when she was first appointed Mayor of Pereira during the administration of President Alfonso López Michelsen and the following year was appointed Governor of Risaralda. She first ran for office in 1977 as a Liberal party candidate for a seat in the Municipal Council of Pereira, which she won, and years later successfully ran for a seat in the Departmental Assembly of Risaralda.

=== Senate career ===
After serving 16 years in the Chamber of Representatives, Mejía ran for Senator of Colombia in the 2002 legislative elections as a Liberal candidate heading the Electoral List 648 that also included Ernesto Zuluaga Ramírez, Atilano Alonso Giraldo Arboleda, Miguel Ángel Pérez Gamboa, and José Albeiro Gallego Agudelo. In the national general election she received 55,087 votes, most of them from the Coffee-Growers Axis region, that represented 0.535% of the total national votes earning her a seat in the Senate.

In 2004, following a national debate about amending the constitution to allow for a second presidential term, a motion widely popular among Colombians and sought by the sitting President Álvaro Uribe Vélez, Mejía voted in favour of the re-election amendment and went against the official position of her party which opposed the re-elections of Uribe that demanded that all its members vote against it. For her vote, Mejía and other eight Liberal Senators including: Luis Guillermo Vélez Trujillo, José Renán Trujillo García, Víctor Renán Barco López, Jorge Aurelio Iragorri Hormaza, Piedad del Socorro Zuccardi de García, Dilian Francisca Toro Torres, Manuel Antonio Díaz Jimeno, and Flor Modesta Gnecco Arregocés, were suspended by the Disciplinary Tribunal of the Liberal Party for a period of ten months each; She was replaced in Congress on 28 August 2004 by Ernesto Zuluaga Ramírez, second-in-row of her electoral list.

== Personal life ==
Born 16 March 1945 in Pereira, Risaralda, Mariza, as she is known to those close to her, is the daughter of Bernardo Mejía Jaramillo and Dora Marulanda Gutiérrez. She completed her secondary education in Pereira and later attended Michigan State University where she graduated with a Bachelor in Economics, and later received a master's degree in Art History.

== See also ==
- María Victoria Calle Correa
