= Juan Mayr =

Colombian diplomat (born 1952)

Juan Mayr Maldonado
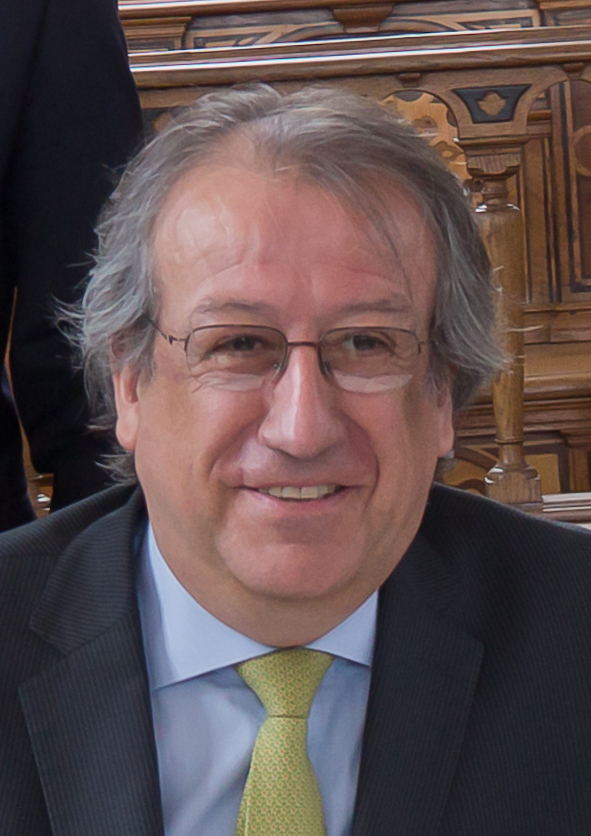
- Juan Mayr Maldonado, 2013

Colombia Ambassador to Germany
- Incumbent
- Assumed office 19 October 2011
- President: Juan Manuel Santos Calderón
- Preceded by: Victoriana Mejía Marulanda

5th Colombian Minister of Environment
- In office 7 August 1998 – 7 August 2002
- President: Andrés Pastrana Arango
- Preceded by: Eduardo Verano de la Rosa
- Succeeded by: Cecilia Rodríguez González-Rubio

Personal details
- Born: 27 May 1952 (age 73) Bogotá, D.C., Colombia
- Spouse: Marcela Nieto Heguy

Juan Mayr Maldonado (born 27 May 1952) is a Colombian photographer and environmentalist who served as Ambassador of Colombia to Germany from 2011 to 2016. From 1993 to 1996, Mayr was elected vice president of the World Conservation Union. In 1998 he became Minister of Environment of Colombia. He has also been president of the United Nations' conference on Biosafety.

== Goldman Prize ==
Mayr was awarded the Goldman Environmental Prize in 1993, for leading a struggle for protecting biodiversity in the Sierra Nevada de Santa Marta. He lived two years with the Kogi, and founded the Fundación Pro-Sierra Nevada de Santa Marta in 1986. In 1994 the Colombian government returned 19,500 hectares of traditional lands to the indigenous peoples of the Sierra Nevada.

== Ambassadorship ==
On 30 August 2011, President Juan Manuel Santos Calderón appointed Mayr Ambassador of Colombia to Germany during a ceremony at the Palace of Nariño; Mayr presented his credentials to President Christian Wulff on 19 October 2011 at the Bellevue Palace.

== Selected works ==
- Mayr Maldonado, Juan (September–October 2008). "The Law of The Mother" (Article). Resurgence (250). ISSN 0034-5970.
