= Lalo railway station =

Railway station in Lalo, Thailand

Lalo ลาโละ
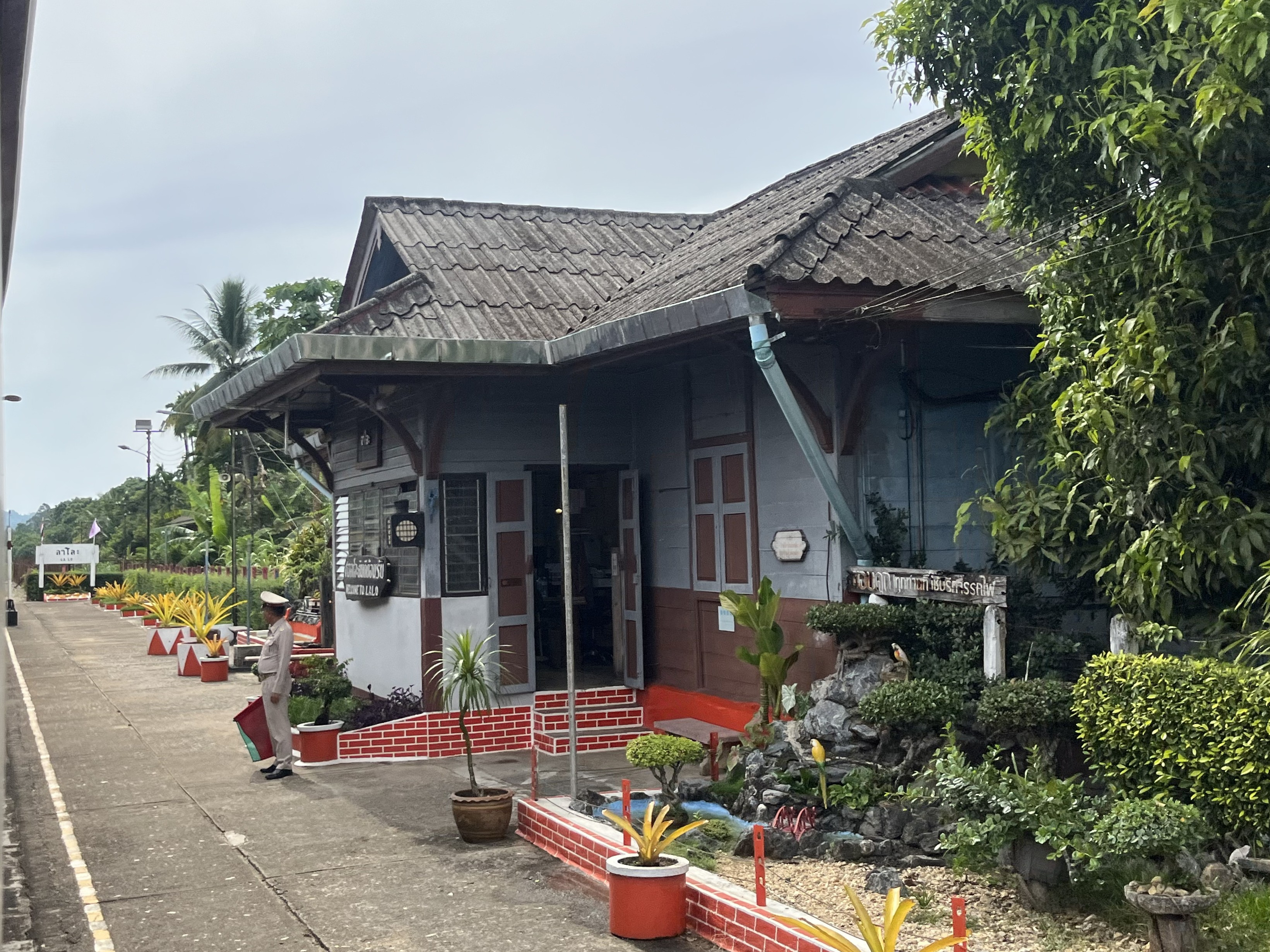

General information
- Location: Mu 5 (Ban Lalo), Lalo Subdistrict, Rueso District, Narathiwat
- Coordinates: 6.3553°N 101.5793°E
- Owner: State Railway of Thailand
- Line: Southern Line
- Platforms: 1
- Tracks: 2

Other information
- Station code: ลล.

Services
| Preceding station | State Railway of Thailand | Following station |
|---|---|---|
| Ban Salo Bukit Yuaerae Halt towards Hua Lamphong or Krung Thep Aphiwat | Southern Line | Maruebo towards Su-ngai Kolok |
Location

Lalo railway station is a railway station located in Lalo Subdistrict, Rueso District, Narathiwat. It is a class 3 railway station located 1,081.779 km (672.2 mi) from Thon Buri railway station.

== Services ==
- Local No. 447/448 Surat Thani-Sungai Kolok-Surat Thani
- Local No. 451/452 Nakhon Si Thammarat-Sungai Kolok-Nakhon Si Thammarat
- Local No. 453/454 Yala-Sungai Kolok-Yala
- Local No. 463/464 Phatthalung-Sungai Kolok-Phatthalung
