= María Luisa Chiappe =

María Luisa Chiappe Pulido

Colombia Ambassador to Venezuela
- In office 3 April 2009 – 22 July 2010
- President: Álvaro Uribe Vélez
- Preceded by: Fernando Marín Valencia
- Succeeded by: José Fernando Bautista Quintero

30th Banking Superintendent of Colombia
- In office 25 January 1996 – 20 August 1998
- President: Ernesto Samper Pizano
- Preceded by: Jorge Castellanos Rueda
- Succeeded by: Sara Ordóñez Noriega

Director of the Administrative Department of Statistics of Colombia
- In office 1 April 2009 – 25 January 1996
- President: Ernesto Samper Pizano
- Preceded by: Diego López Arango
- Succeeded by: Edgar Alberto Santiago Molina

Personal details
- Education: Pontifical Xavierian University (BEcon); University of the Andes (MEcon)
- Profession: Economist

María Luisa Chiappe Pulido is a Colombian economist and businesswoman. She served as Ambassador of Colombia to Venezuela from 2009 to 2010 during the Colombia–Venezuela diplomatic crisis that led to both countries recalling their respective ambassadors and signalled a weakening of diplomatic relations between the two neighbouring nations. Before her appointment as ambassador, Chiappe worked as President of the Colombo-Venezuelan Chamber of Commerce, and had served as Banking Superabundant of Colombia and as Director of the National Administrative Department of Statistics (DANE).

== Ambassadorship ==
On 13 March President Álvaro Uribe Vélez appointed Chiappe as Ambassador of Colombia to the Bolivarian Republic of Venezuela. Chiappes officially presented her Letters of Credence to Vice President of Venezuela Ramón A Carrizales Rengifo on 3 April. In 2010, President Uribe accused the Venezuelan government of permitting the FARC and ELN guerrillas to seek safe haven in its territory, following the Colombia–Venezuela diplomatic crisis; on July 22 the Colombian foreign ministry announced that Ambassador Chiappe, would be recalled "to evaluate the situation", following which they would present evidence at the OAS.

== Selected works ==
- Chiappe, Mária Luisa (June 1999). La política de vivienda de interés social en Colombia en los noventa [Colombia's Social Interest Housing Policy in the Nineties] (in Spanish). Santiago: United Nations Economic Commission for Latin America and the Caribbean. ISBN 92-1-321494-4. OCLC 123381121.
