= Godofredo García =

Godofredo García (born in Lima, Peru, November 8, 1888 - July 16, 1970) was a Peruvian mathematician and engineer. He was the author of more than 80 publications covering mathematics, physics, astronomy, astrophysics, and engineering.

== Background ==
He studied at the Colegio de Lima, under Pedro A. Labarthe. In 1906 he entered the Faculty of Sciences of the National University of San Marcos, where he received a bachelor's degree (1909) and later his doctorate degree in Mathematical Sciences (1912), with his thesis on "Singular points of flat curves" and "Resistance of Columns of reinforced concrete", respectively. Simultaneously, he studied at the School of Engineers of Peru, now called the National University of Engineering (1908-1910), graduating from Civil engineer in 1911.

From 1912, he taught at the Chorrillos Military School, where he was in charge of the courses of Flat, Descriptive and Analytical Geometry, Infinitesimal Calculus, Rational Mechanics and Exterior Ballistics. He was also professor of Rational Mechanics in the Faculty of Sciences of the University of San Marcos beginning in 1919 and later served as dean (1928-1940). He became Rector (1941-1943). He was also a professor at the School of Engineers corresponding with Albert Einstein.

In the 1920s he worked with the Polish mathematician Alfred Rosenblatt in San Marcos. In 1938, together with Rosenblatt and other San Marcos mathematicians, he founded the National Academy of Exact, Physical and Natural Sciences of Peru, an institution that he presided over from 1960 until he died in 1970. He also directed the publication Actas de la Academia".

García was elected to the American Philosophical Society in 1943. He was awarded the national prize for scientific research, in recognition of his contributions in the field of mathematical sciences and his "Exact equations and exact solutions to the movement and stresses of viscous fluids" (1948).

He organized conferences in Lima with the participation of Tullio Levi-Civita, Arthur Compton and Garret Birkhoff, among others. In each conference Godofredo García presented a review of the work of these scientists.

He married Alicia Rendón (Ecuadorian) and fathered four children.

== Bibliography ==
- Lessons of Rational Mechanics, UNMSM; 1937.
- On a New Cosmogonic Theory, 1940.
- Algebraic Analysis, Ed. Sanmarti, 1955.
