= Lalo Barrubia =

Uruguayan writer and artist

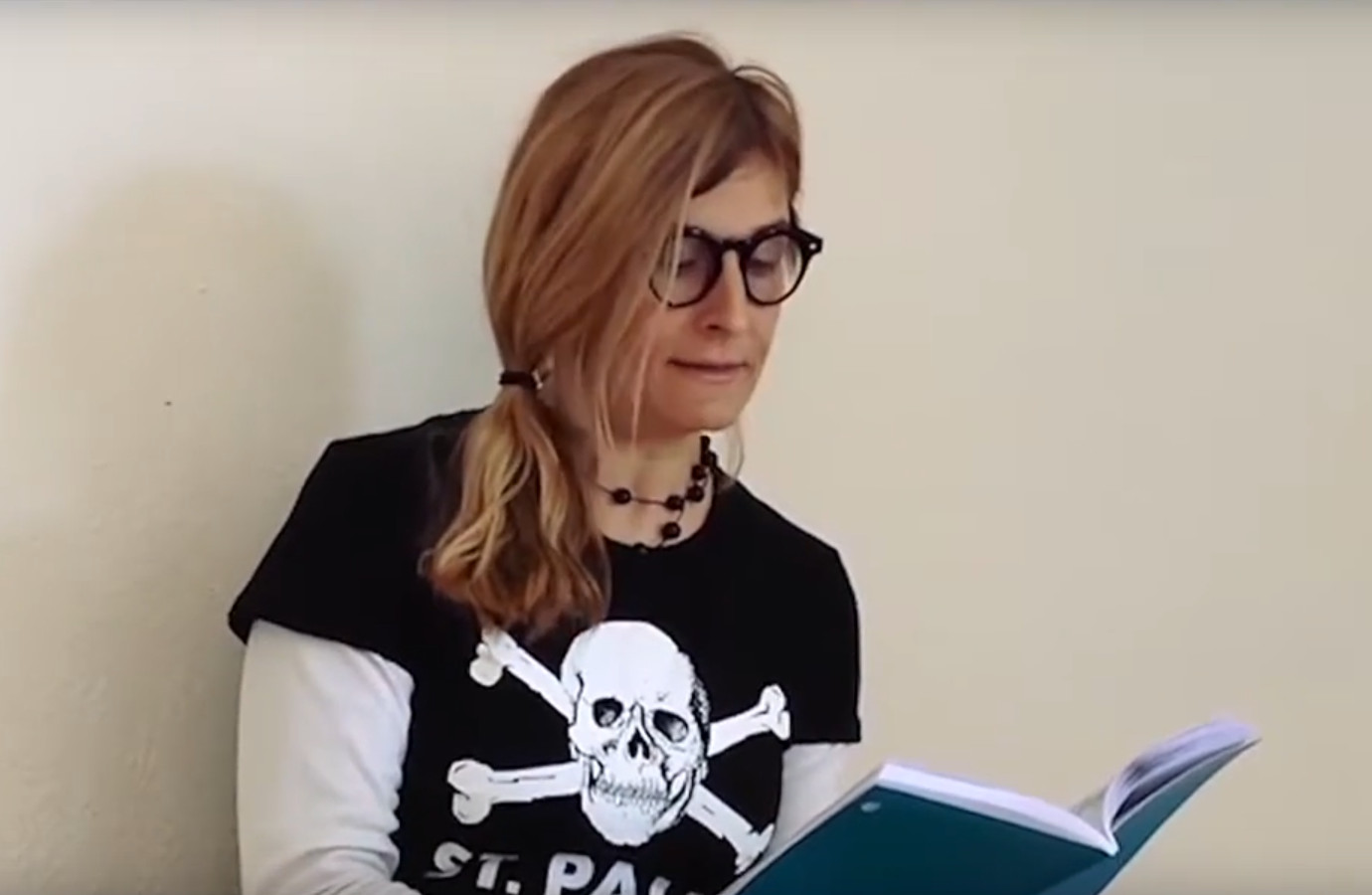
- Reading one of her poems in 2016
- Born: María del Rosario González; 9 April 1967 (age 59); Montevideo, Uruguay
- Occupations: Writer, translator, performer
- Website: www.lalobarrubia.com

María del Rosario González (born 9 April 1967), known as Lalo Barrubia, is a Uruguayan writer, performer, and translator based in Malmö, Sweden.

== Career ==
Lalo Barrubia has published eight books of poetry, several novels, and short story collections. Her texts appear in the anthologies Zur-dos: última poesía latinoamericana (Paradiso, Argentina, 2004) and Porque el país no alcanza: poesía emigrante de la América Latina (EBL, Mexico, 2011), among others. In 2014 she was awarded the National Literature Prize of Uruguay in the Narrative category (published works) for the book Ratas (originally published by Criatura in 2012).

In 2011 she published her first book of poems in bilingual edition in Sweden, Borracha en las ciudades, with translation by Juana Adcock. In 2015 she worked on the project 100 KAVD (100 short and angry everyday poems / Copenhagen – Helsinki) that brings together poetry and performance. She is the editor of the translated poetry series La Piedra Imán (Ediciones Liliputienses, Spain) and teaches poetry and prose workshops.

She has also worked as a cultural producer and project manager for several public and private institutions, including Kulturförvaltningen i Malmö.

In 2020 her short story "L'angelito" was published in translation in Italian literary magazine L'ircocervo.

== Works ==
- Suzuki 400 (poetry, 1989 / 2nd ed. 2017)
- Tabaco (poetry, 1999)
- Arena (novel, 2004 / 2nd ed. 2017)
- Pegame que me gusta (novel, 2009 / 2nd ed. 2014)
- Borracha en las ciudades (poetry, 2011 / 2nd ed. 2013 / 3rd ed. 2016)
- Ratas (tales, 2012)
- Los misterios dolorosos (novel, 2013)

== Performances ==
- La puta madre, 1991
- El Rap de la Pocha, 1999-2000
- Latino for ever (Montevideo – Maldonado – Berlín – Helsinki) 2007–2008
- Parásitos (Malmö – Lund – Helsinki) 2008-2011
- Fronteras/Borderline (Gothenburg – Mexico City – Montevideo) 2013–2014
- 100 KAVD (Copenhagen – Helsinki), 2015

== Awards ==
- Award of the Ministry of Education and Culture of Uruguay (2011) – 3rd Prize in the Narrative category
- Annual Literature Awards (2014) – 1st Prize in the Narrative category (published work: Ratas, 2012)
