= Victoriana Mejía Marulanda =

Colombian diplomat (born 1943)

Colombia Ambassador to Sweden
- Assuming office
- President: Juan Manuel Santos Calderón
- Succeeding: Rafael Nieto Navia

Colombia Ambassador to Germany
- In office 12 March 2003 – 2011
- President: Álvaro Uribe Vélez
- Preceded by: Hernán Beltz Peralta
- Succeeded by: Juan Mayr

Personal details
- Born: María Dora Victoriana Mejía Marulanda; 23 April 1943 (age 83) Pereira, Risaralda, Colombia
- Party: Liberal
- Spouse: John P. R. Kriendler (m. 1937)
- Relations: María Isabel Mejía Marulanda (sister)
- Children: Sara Mejia Kriendler
- Education: University of Michigan (BA, MA)
- Profession: Economist, Diplomat

María Dora Victoriana Mejía Marulanda (born 23 April 1943) is a Colombian diplomat who was the Ambassador of Colombia to Sweden. Prior to her ambassadorship, Mejía served as First Secretary of the Colombian Embassy in Brussels from 1994 to 1997 when she was promoted to the rank of Consul General in that same city and remained in that post until 1998.

== Ambassadorship ==
Mejía was named by President Álvaro Uribe Vélez on 11 October 2002. She was officially appointed Ambassador Extraordinary and Minister Plenipotentiary of the Republic of Colombia to the Federal Republic of Germany on 30 November 2002 and presented her Letters of Credence to German President Johannes Rau on 12 March 2003.

== Personal life ==
Born on 23 April 1943 in Pereira, Risaralda, to Bernardo Mejía Jaramillo and María Dora Marulanda Gutiérrez. She married John P. R. Kriendler on 28 July 1982 in Paris, France, and together had one daughter, Sara (born 1983). Her younger sister, María Isabel is a Liberal party politician who has served as Mayor of Pereira, Governor of Risaralda, and Congresswoman in both the Chamber and the Senate.
