= Evaristo Sourdis Juliao =

Colombian lawyer and diplomat

- Sourdis in 1952 as Chairman of the delegation of Colombia to the 7th Session of the United Nations General Assembly.

23rd Comptroller General of Colombia
- In office August 1967 – February 1969
- President: Carlos Lleras Restrepo
- Preceded by: Reginaldo Mendoza Pantoja
- Succeeded by: Víctor Guillermo Ricardo Piñeros

6th Permanent Representative of Colombia to the United Nations
- In office 5 March 1953 – 13 June 1953
- President: Roberto Urdaneta Arbeláez
- Preceded by: Carlos Echeverri Cortés
- Succeeded by: Francisco José Urrutia Holguín

Minister of Foreign Affairs of Colombia
- In office 13 June 1953 – 19 September 1956
- President: Gustavo Rojas Pinilla
- Preceded by: Guillermo León Valencia Muñoz
- Succeeded by: José Manuel Rivas Sacconi
- In office 2 February 1950 – 7 August 1950
- President: Mariano Ospina Pérez
- Preceded by: Elíseo Arango Ramos
- Succeeded by: Gonzalo Restrepo Jaramillo

Personal details
- Born: 27 March 1905 Sabanalarga, Atlántico, Colombia
- Died: 22 September 1970 (aged 65) Barranquilla, Atlántico, Colombia
- Party: Conservative
- Spouse: Adelaida Nájera del Castillo
- Children: Adelaida Sourdis Nájera; María Teresa Sourdis Nájera; Evaristo Sourdis Nájera
- Education: Free University of Colombia; Externado University
- Profession: Lawyer

Evaristo Sourdis Juliao (27 March 1905 – 22 September 1970) was a lawyer and diplomat who served as 23rd Comptroller General of Colombia, from 1967–69, the sixth Permanent Representative of Colombia to the United Nations in 1953, and as Minister of Foreign Affairs of Colombia first in 1950 and again from 1953–56.

As a politician, he rose from local politics starting as Deputy to the Departmental Assembly of Atlántico, Councilman of Barranquilla, and Secretary of Government of Atlántico, and moving to the national stage first as Member of the Chamber of Representatives of Colombia for Atlántico, and then as Senator of Colombia.

His popularity, career and good bipartisan relations allowed him to run as candidate during Colombian presidential election of 1970 during the last period of the National Front that went to the Conservative party, but at the end lost to Misael Pastrana Borrero. After the election, Sourdis was named Ambassador of Colombia to Venezuela, but died before he could take up his post.

== Personal life ==
Evaristo was born on 27 March 1905 in Sabanalarga, Atlántico to Arístides Sourdis and Raquel Henriquez Juliao Tatis, both of Sephardic Jewish descent. He studied Law in the Free University of Colombia and the Externado University between 1924 and 1929.

He married Adelaida Nájera del Castillo, and together they had three children, Adelaida, María Teresa and Evaristo.

== Links ==
- Profile, uninorte.edu.co; accessed 12 March 2016.
