= Manuel Bartolomé Ferreyros =

Peruvian diplomat, politician and writer (1793–1872)

Manuel Bartolome Ferreyros
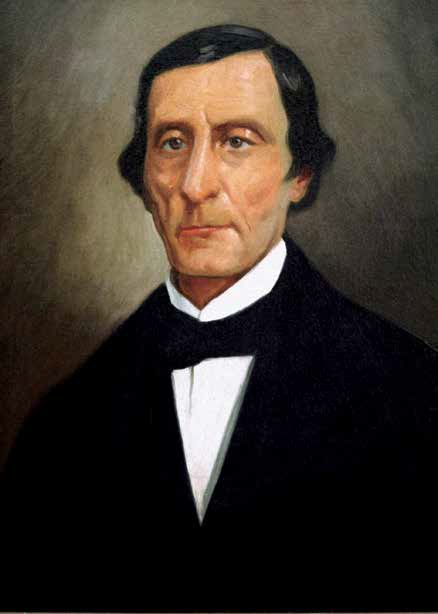

Minister of Government and Foreign Relations
- In office August 25, 1849 – April 20, 1851
- President: Ramón Castilla
- Preceded by: Mariano José Sanz
- Succeeded by: Joaquín José de Osma
- In office November 23, 1839 – July 12, 1841
- President: Agustín Gamarra
- Preceded by: Manuel del Río
- Succeeded by: Manuel Pérez de Tudela
- In office May 20, 1835 – June 24, 1835
- President: Felipe Santiago Salaverry
- Preceded by: Bonifacio Lazarte
- Succeeded by: Ildefonso Zavala

Minister of Finance
- In office July 29, 1839 – January 3, 1841
- Preceded by: Ramón Castilla
- Succeeded by: Manuel del Río
- In office August 24, 1838 – August 24, 1838
- Preceded by: Ramón Castilla
- Succeeded by: Manuel del Río

President of the General Constituent Congress
- In office August 15, 1839 – September 15, 1839
- Succeeded by: Agustín Guillermo Charún

Deputy of the Constituent Congress (for Lima)
- In office August 15, 1839 – July 12, 1840

Deputy of the Constituent Congress (for Cuzco)
- In office September 20, 1822 – March 10, 1825

Commissioner of Peru to Colombia
- In office 1825 – April 1, 1826

Personal details
- Born: August 24, 1793; Lima, Viceroyalty of Peru
- Died: September 24, 1872 (aged 79); Lima, Peru

Manuel Bartolomé Ferreyros de la Mata (August 24, 1793 — September 24, 1872) was a Peruvian politician, diplomat and writer. He was three times Minister of Foreign Affairs in various governments (1835, 1839–1841 and 1849–1851) and twice Minister of Finance (1838 and 1839–1841). He was also entrusted with numerous diplomatic posts. A prominent internationalist, he presided over the first American Congress that met in Lima, in 1847–1848, during the first government of Ramón Castilla. He was also a deputy in various Constituent Congresses of the Republic: that of 1822 (of which he was secretary); that of 1839 (of which he was president) and that of 1860.

== Biography ==
His parents were Manuel Ferreyros y Pérez, Spanish, and María Andrea de la Mata y Ulloa, from Lima. He studied at the Colegio de San Ildefonso. At the age of fifteen he entered the customs accounting service as a meritorious employee, being successively promoted to clerk (1808), third officer (1816) and second officer (1821).

Despite being an employee at the service of the viceregal government, he did not hesitate to join the cause of Independence and signed the declaration act that the people of Lima approved in an open town hall on July 15, 1821. He presented a memorandum to the Patriotic Society on fishing (March 5, 1822).

Elected deputy for Cuzco, he became a member of the first Constituent Congress, of which he was secretary from March 20 to May 20, 1823, and on November 20, 1824. He collaborated in the weekly La Abeja Republicana, defender of the republican ideology against to monarchical ideas (1823). He was part of the commission sent to Gran Colombia to manage the arrival of Bolívar. President José de la Riva Agüero deported him with seven other parliamentarians, but soon after he rejoined Congress.

After the war of independence, the congress sent him to Colombia as plenipotentiary minister, to thank that country for the help provided in the common cause of independence, as well as to make present how important it was for Peru to have the presence of Bolivar (1825). Back in Peru, he was appointed customs administrator (1826). In 1827 he was appointed prefect of Lima, a position he resigned when the coup d'état that deposed President José de La Mar (1829) took place.

He then went to Bolivia as plenipotentiary minister (September 27, 1830), with the mission of negotiating friendship and cooperation treaties between Peru and Bolivia; For this purpose he had several conferences with the Bolivian minister Casimiro Olañeta in the city of Arequipa, until February 9, 1831. He later accompanied President Agustín Gamarra as general secretary, during the campaign on the border with Bolivia.

Back in Lima, he was appointed General Director of Customs (1833). Once the dictatorship of Lieutenant Colonel Felipe Santiago Salaverry was established, he served it as Minister of Government and Foreign Relations, from May 20 to June 24, 1835. After Salaverry's defeat and death, he went to Ecuador, where he wrote the newspaper El Ariete, in whose pages he fought the Peru-Bolivian Confederation (1838).

He returned to Peru with the Restoring Army of Peru, which, allied with the Chileans, attacked the Confederate government. When Gamarra formed his provisional government in Lima, he was appointed Minister of Finance in absentia (August 24, 1838), a position that was filled by another. And although he was again appointed to occupy said portfolio on July 29, 1839, he had to leave it promptly because he was elected deputy to represent Lima in the General Constituent Congress meeting in Huancayo (from August 15 to November 28, 1839). assembly of which he became president.

Gamarra, recognizing his merits as a statesman, appointed him Minister of Government and Foreign Relations, a position he held from November 23, 1839, to July 12, 1841. One of his great achievements was the signing with the representative of Brazil in Lima Mr. Duarte Da Ponte Ribeyro, of a "peace, friendship, trade and navigation treaty". This marked the formal beginning of Peru's relations with said South American power (July 8, 1841). Apart from the navigation and trade agreements, as well as the way in which the corresponding transactions should be carried out, it was agreed with regard to the arrangement of limits "to carry it out as soon as possible according to the uti possidetis of 1821", with the Commitment to make changes or territorial compensation, according to the agreement between the parties. The following day a Postal Convention was signed, with the participation of the same diplomats.

He was director of the Post Office (1841); member of the Council of State (1845–1849), of which he was 2nd vice-president; and delegate of Peru in the American Congress that at that time met in Lima to establish the tranquility and security of the American peoples (1847–48).

With the representatives of Chile and New Granada he negotiated the payment of the debts of the War of Independence, thus honoring the commitment made by Peru in return for the aid provided by the liberating armies, despite the opposition of some voices, who considered that since independence had been a joint continental enterprise and where Peruvians contributed more than any other people with the blood of their children, the government should not pay anything.

At the end of the first government of Castilla, he was again appointed Minister of Foreign Affairs, a position he held from August 25, 1849, to April 20, 1851.

In 1855 he was appointed general director of the Treasury and presided over the operations of consolidation of the internal debt. He was also appointed General Director of Studies and as such guided the reorganization of the educational system carried out by the second government of Castilla. Likewise, he was a member of the Junta designated to agree on the Continental Treaty, whose purpose was to organize a joint front of the South American nations in the face of the interventionist threat of the European powers.

He was accredited as a plenipotentiary minister in Ecuador (1858–1859) and in Bolivia (1859). He was also an honorary member of the Lima Bar Association, a member of the jury for Supreme Court liability cases, president of the fiscal examination board to investigate consolidation fraud, and a member of the National Statistics Council.

== Works ==
As a literary writer, he left a scattered body of work that no historian of Peruvian literature has attempted to analyze. José Toribio Polo included his poetry in Parnaso Peruano (1916); but other critics such as Luis Alberto Sánchez did not give relevance to his poetic creation. In 1916 his poems were published by Ricardo Tizón y Bueno, as well as in 1991, by Dr. Wu Brading.

Ferreyros also produced a prose translation of Lord Byron's Childe Harold, which was published posthumously in the Revista de Lima (1873).

But, apart from his literary attempts, Ferreyros left behind other interesting productions: combat journalism, pamphlets, articles and notes on matters of national interest, such as his defense of Ramón Castilla against the Ecuadorian Pedro Montalvo. They are not works that necessarily have a literary brilliance, but they harbor a solid dialectic and a deep patriotic love.

== Family ==
Married to María Josefa Basilia Senra y Echevarría, he was the father of numerous children. Two of his children stood out:

- Manuel Ferreyros Senra (1833–1876), sailor, one of the "Four Aces of the Peruvian Navy", along with Miguel Grau, Aurelio García y García and Lizardo Montero.
- Carlos Ferreyros Senra (1843–1910), also a sailor, participated in the naval campaign of the War of the Pacific, having an outstanding performance during the naval campaign serving aboard the Pilcomayo gunboat.

Another lesser-known son of his was Eusebio Demetrio Ferreyros Senra (1847–1868), also a sailor, who died during the Arica tsunami of 1868, when the corvette América on which he served ran aground.

== Bibliography ==
- Basadre, Jorge (1998). Historia de la República del Perú, 1822–1933. Tomo I (8th ed.). La República.
- Tauro del Pino, Alberto (2001). Enciclopedia Ilustrada del Perú. Tomo III. FER/GUZ (3rd ed.). PEISA. ISBN 9972-40-156-1.
