= Fernando Marín (businessman) =

Colombian businessman

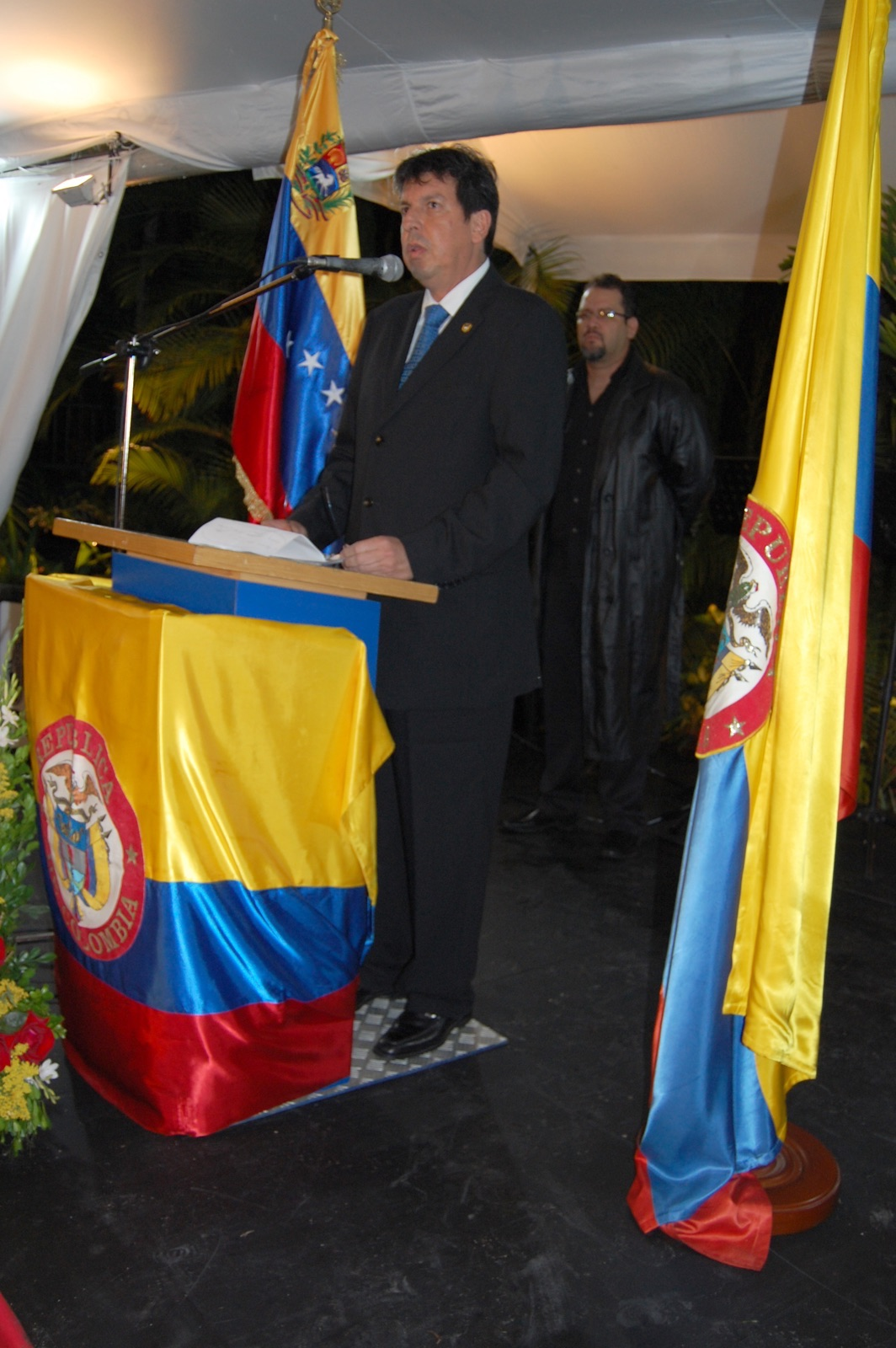
Fernando Marin Valencia

Fernando Marín Valencia is a Colombian businessman and the founder and president of Grama Construction (Grama Construcciones or Grupo Grama). He was born in Colombia in 1955 and studied civil engineering at the Industrial University of Santander (Colombia) graduating with honors in 1978. His entered politics as a Councilor for Floridablanca, a city in Colombia and later became involved during the presidential campaigns for Andres Pastrana and Alvaro Uribe. Last 28 May was captured by the Colombian authorities for being involved in bribery and laundry money.

== Early life ==
From 1998 to 2002 he served as a board member for Ecopetrol, the largest and primary petroleum company in Colombia, as a representative for former President Pastrana and in 2002 he was appointed as Colombian Ambassador to Malaysia, Thailand and Vietnam.

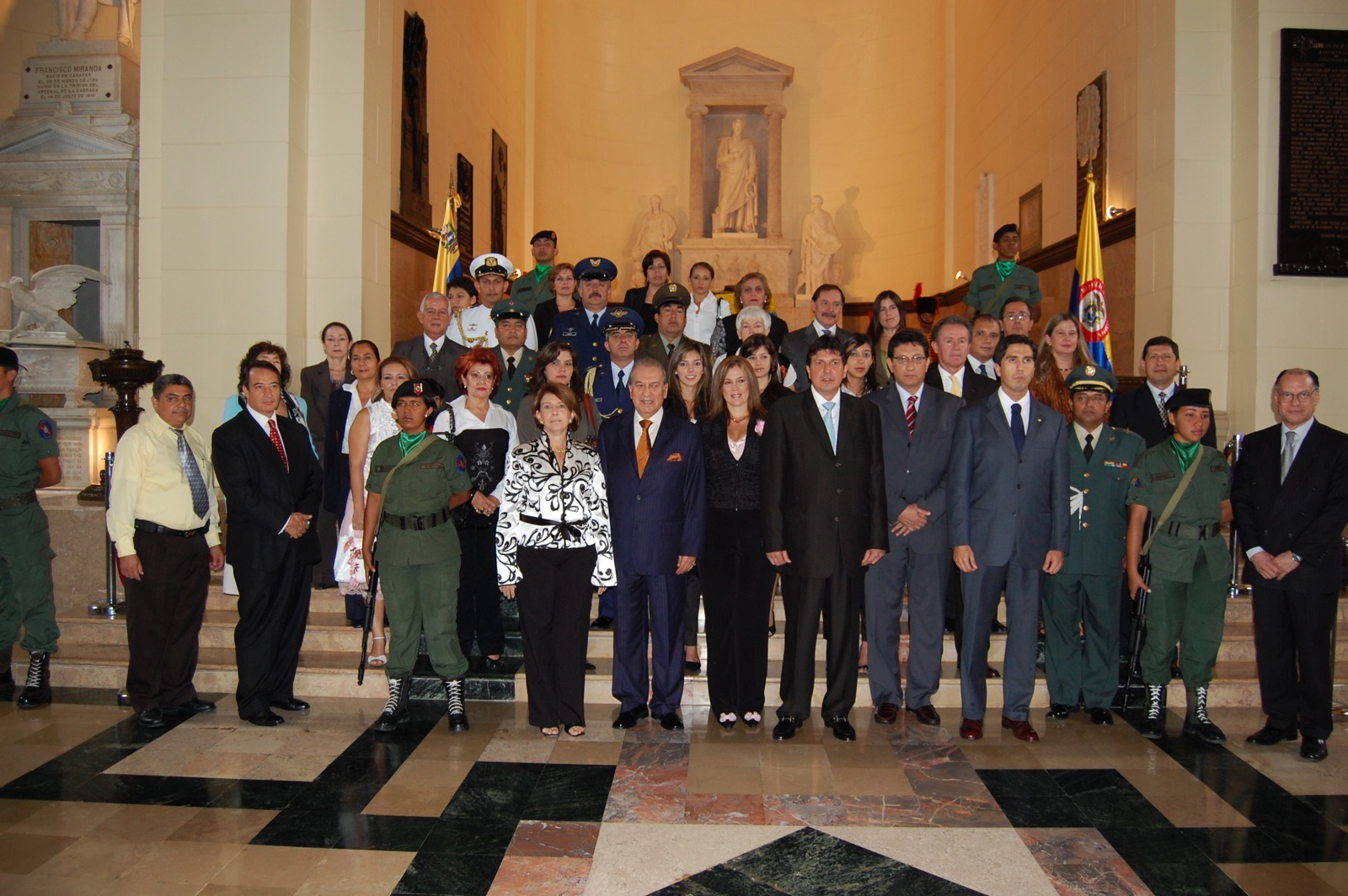
Fernando Marin Valencia in Army

In 2007, he was made Ambassador to Venezuela, Suriname and Guyana during the presidency of Alvaro Uribe.

His career in real estate began in 1976 when he founded Marval Construction S.A. along with his father and brothers and in 2004 he founded Grama.

== Awards and recognition ==
- Honorable Order of the Colombian Congress – Order Cross of the Commander.
- Order of the Meritory Citizen (awarded by the Mayor of Bucaramanga).
- Executive Leadership Golden Award for the development of the Santander region (awarded the Alumni Association of the Industrial University of Santander).
- Plaque of Recognition - FENALCO.
