= Luis Guillermo Vélez =

Colombian politician (1943–2007)

Luis Guillermo Vélez Trujillo

Senator of Colombia
- In office 12 December 1991 – 6 February 2007

Colombia Ambassador to El Salvador
- In office 1983–1985
- President: Belisario Betancur

Colombia Ambassador to Norway
- In office 1980–1983
- President: Julio César Turbay Ayala (1980-1982); Belisario Betancur (1982–1983)

Personal details
- Born: June 17, 1943 Medellín, Antioquia, Colombia
- Died: February 6, 2007 (aged 63) Bogotá, DC, Colombia
- Party: Liberal (1991–2002); Social National Unity (2002–2007)
- Spouse: Lilia Cabrera
- Children: Luis Guillermo, Lilia María, and Juanita
- Education: Pontifical Xavierian University
- Occupation: Politician
- Profession: Lawyer and Economist

Luis Guillermo Vélez Trujillo (June 17, 1943 – February 6, 2007) was a Colombian lawyer, economist, and politician who served as Senator of Colombia, ambassador of Colombia to El Salvador and the Kingdom of Norway, and Minister Plenipotentiary of Colombia to the United States.

== Life ==
Vélez Trujillo was born on June 17, 1943, in Medellín, Antioquia where he also attended primary and secondary school in the Colegio de San Ignacio. He moved to Bogotá to study at the Pontifical Xavierian University where he graduated with a Doctorate in Law and Economics.

He was appointed Ambassador of Colombia to the Kingdom of Norway in 1980 by President Julio César Turbay Ayala, post he occupied until 1983 when he was appointed Ambassador to El Salvador where he participated in the crucial peace talks of the Contadora Group. His diplomatic career reached its highest point as Minister Plenipotentiary to the United States between 1988 and 1990 where he worked closely lobbying the US Congress to advance Colombian interests in passing the Andean Trade Preference Act.

== Death ==
Luis Guillermo Vélez Trujillo died on February 6, 2007, at the Cardio Infantil Clinic in Bogotá after suffering a heart attack. His was body was taken to the Capitolio Nacional and left lying in state in the Senate. Afterwards his body was taken to the Primary Cathedral of Bogotá for a state funeral attended by his family, President Uribe Vélez, Senate President Dilian Francisca Toro, ex President Ernesto Samper and other congressmen and high officials. He was finally taken to the Jardines de Paz cemetery in northern Bogotá where his body was cremated.
