= José Fernando Bautista =

Colombian lawyer and politician (1963–2024)

Colombia Ambassador to Venezuela
- In office 6 December 2010 – 12 May 2011
- President: Juan Manuel Santos
- Preceded by: María Luisa Chiappe
- Succeeded by: Carlos Cure Cure

4th President of the Agrarian Bank of Colombia
- In office 31 August 2006 – 27 July 2007
- President: Álvaro Uribe
- Preceded by: César Pardo
- Succeeded by: David Guerrero

Mayor of Cúcuta
- In office 2 August 1999 – 14 November 2000
- Governor: Jorge Alberto García
- Preceded by: José Gélvez Albarracín
- Succeeded by: Betty Parada Montes

42nd Minister of Communications
- In office 26 August 1997 – 7 August 1998
- Preceded by: Saulo Arboleda Gómez
- Succeeded by: Claudia de Francisco

Personal details
- Born: José Fernando Bautista Quintero; 1963 Cúcuta, North Santander, Colombia
- Died: 8 August 2024 (aged 60–61) Lisbon, Portugal
- Party: Party of the U (2005–2024)
- Other political affiliations: Liberal (until 2005)
- Domestic partner: Ángela Sofía Garzón Caicedo (m. 2007–2012)
- Education: Free University of Colombia (LLB)
- Profession: Lawyer

José Fernando Bautista Quintero (1963 – 8 August 2024) was a Colombian lawyer and politician. Bautista was appointed Ambassador of Colombia to Venezuela by President Juan Manuel Santos Calderón to mend relations with the administration of President Hugo Chávez Frías after the 2010 Colombia–Venezuela diplomatic crisis that had driven the two neighbouring nations to the brink of armed conflict. He also served as the President of the Agrarian Bank of Colombia, Minister of Communications, Mayor of Cúcuta, and Colombian Consul in Pretoria, and São Paulo.

== Minister of Communications ==
In 1996 while serving as General Secretary of the Colombian Liberal Party, President Ernesto Samper Pizano appointed Bautista as Deputy Minister of Communications, officially being sworn in on 27 August 1996. The next year on 26 August 1997, Bautista was appointed Minister of Communications replacing his former boss Saulo Arboleda Gómez.

== Personal life and death ==
Bautista was born in Cúcuta to Jorge Bautista Hernández and Blanca Quintero Mora.

Bautista died in Lisbon on 8 August 2024. He had been in ill health for the last few days of his life and was comatose, having been admitted to hospital in that city after suffering a heart attack whilst en route to Porto.
