= Luis Eladio Pérez =

Colombian politician

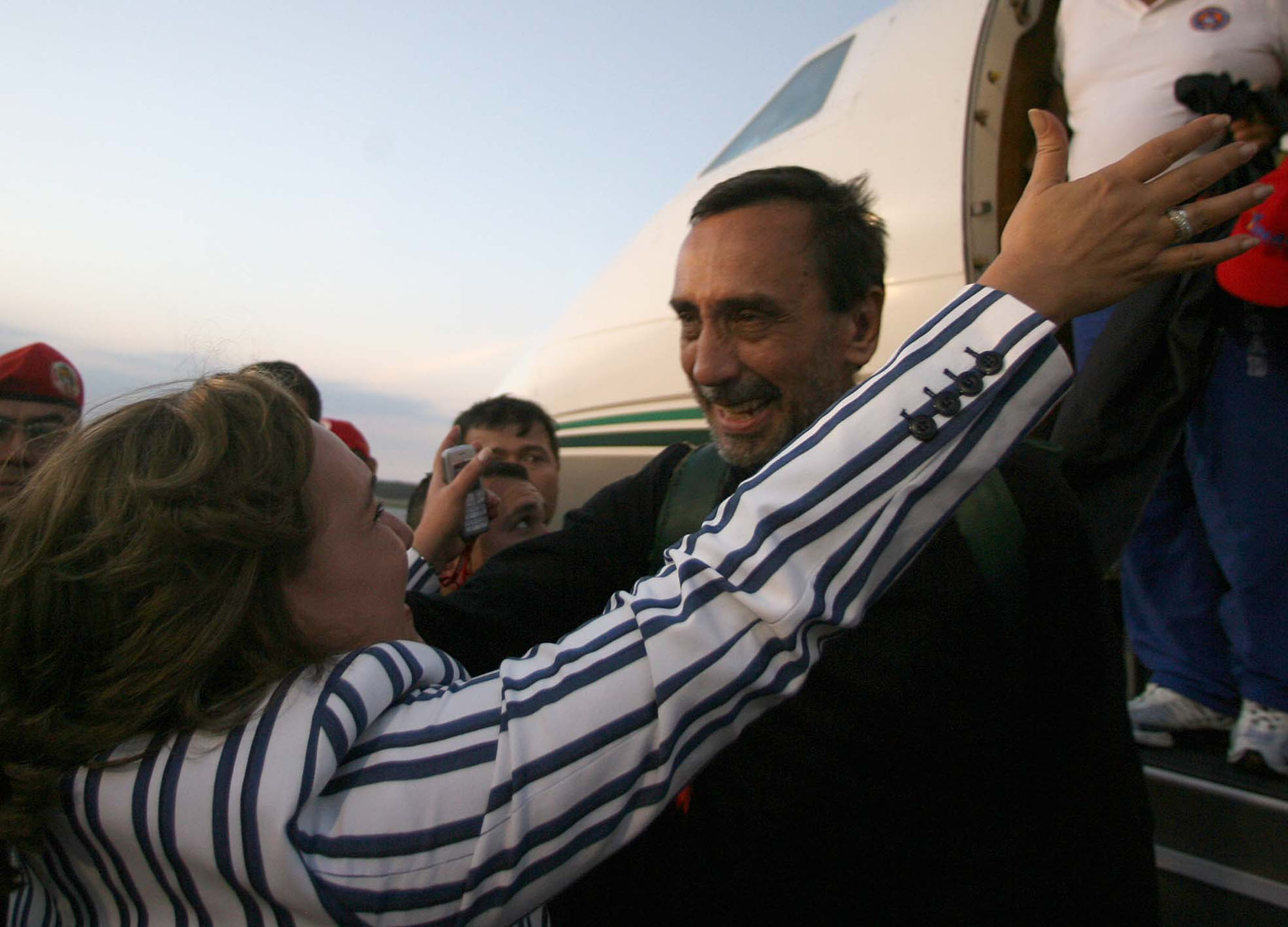
- Occupation: Politician

Luis Eladio Pérez is a Colombian politician. He served as a member of the Senate of Colombia. He was held captive by the FARC for seven years (from 2001 to 2008), four of which were spent alongside fellow politician and captive Ingrid Betancourt.

== See also ==
- List of kidnappings

== Works ==
- Perez, Luis Eladio; Arizmendi, Dario (2009). 7 años secuestrado por las FARC. Doral, Florida: Aguilar. ISBN 9781603963442. OCLC 319873967.
