= Manuel Costas Arce =

Peruvian politician (1820–1883)

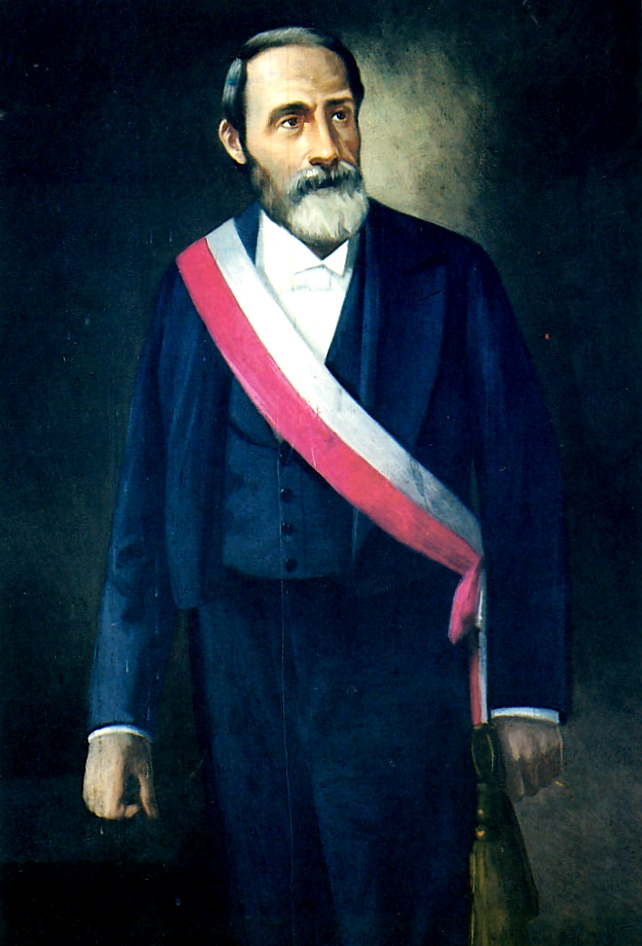

President of the Senate of the Republic of Peru
- In office April 22, 1883 – June 20, 1883
- Succeeded by: Antonio Arenas

First Vice President of Peru
- In office August 2, 1872 – August 2, 1876 Serving with Francisco Garmendia Puértolas
- President: Manuel Pardo
- Preceded by: Mariano Herencia Zevallos
- Succeeded by: Luis La Puerta

Senator of the Republic of Peru
- In office 1868–1872
- Constituency: Puno

President of the Council of Ministers of Peru
- In office August 11, 1864 – October 16, 1864
- President: Juan Antonio Pezet
- Preceded by: Juan Antonio Ribeyro Estrada
- Succeeded by: José Allende

Minister of Government, Police and Public Works
- In office August 11, 1864 – October 16, 1864
- President: Juan Antonio Pezet
- Preceded by: Cipriano Coronel Zegarra
- Succeeded by: Evaristo Gómez Sánchez y Benavides

Personal details
- Born: 1820 Puno, Intendancy of Puno, Kingdom of Peru, Spanish Empire
- Died: 1883 (aged 62–63) Arequipa, Peru
- Party: Civilista Party

Manuel Costas Arce (1820–1883) was a Peruvian politician. He served as the first vice president from 1872 to 1876.

He served as the President of the National convention in 1855, and President of the Senate in 1883.

Preceded by Juan Antonio Ribeyro Estrada	Prime Minister of Peru; August 1864 – April 11, 1865	Succeeded by Manuel Ignacio de Vivanco
