= Madrid Forum =

Right-wing network

- Foro Madrid
- Formation: 26 October 2020
- Type: Anti-communist organization
- Purpose: Ibero-American network of right-wing political parties and organisations
- Headquarters: Madrid, Spain
- Region served: Ibero-America
- Website: foromadrid.org

The Madrid Forum (Spanish: Foro Madrid) is a conservative organization created on 26 October 2020 by the Disenso Foundation, think tank of the far-right Spanish political party Vox.

== Background ==
According to The Rio Times, the aim of the Madrid Forum, an anti-communist international organization with a "permanent structure and an annual action plan", is to be "an alternative" to the "two Latin American leftist platforms, the São Paulo Forum and the Puebla Group. The Sao Paulo Forum "comprises political and social forces, from the Brazilian Workers' Party to the Communist Party of Cuba"; the Puebla Group consists of "a handful of leftist politicians" including Alberto Fernández, Luiz Inácio Lula da Silva, Evo Morales, Rafael Correa, Pepe Mujica, and José Luis Rodríguez Zapatero.

The Madrid Charter is the manifesto of the Madrid Forum; it gathered more than 8,000 signers from throughout the world, with prominent signers Brazilian Eduardo Bolsonaro, Peruvian president Keiko Fujimori and Chilean president Jose Antonio Kast. The Charter alerts that countries “hijacked by communist-inspired totalitarian regimes, supported by drug trafficking, under the umbrella of the Cuban regime" have advanced communism.

Vox introduced the project to the government of then United States president Donald Trump while visiting the United States in February 2019, with Santiago Abascal using his good relations with the administration to build support within the Republican Party and establish ties in America. In March 2019, Abascal tweeted an image of himself wearing a morion similar to a conquistador. Spanish newspaper ABC wrote that this event provided a narrative that "symbolizes in part the expansionist mood of Vox and its ideology far from Spain". On 3 March 2020, Abascal met with Luis Almagro, Secretary General of the Organization of American States, to discuss the creation of the Madrid Forum.

The Madrid Forum was to hold its first event in Madrid in June 2020; it was cancelled due to the COVID-19 pandemic, with the Madrid Charter presented as an online document on 26 October 2020.

== Madrid Charter ==
The Madrid Charter: In Defense of Freedom and Democracy in the Iberosphere (Spanish: Carta de Madrid: en defensa de la libertad y la democracia en la Iberosfera), also known as the Letter from Madrid, was a manifesto created on 26 October 2020 by the Disenso Foundation think tank of Vox. The document denounced left-wing organizations in Ibero-America, said these groups pose a threat to liberal democracy through communism.

With over 8,000 signatories, including over 400 parliamentarians as of 2023, the charter was also signed by conservative and some ultraconservative, and far-right politicians from the Americas and the Iberian Peninsula. Chilean politician José Antonio Kast, one of the document's signatories, proposed in October 2021 that the signatories of the Madrid Charter establish an International Anti-Radical Left Coordination, stating that "what is happening in Colombia is no coincidence. The model of the antisocial outbreak is repeated in Chile."

=== Content ===
In the document, signatories define two entities; the first is an allied Iberosphere of nations holding the same roots to the Iberian Peninsula and the second are left-wing groups, such as the São Paulo Forum and the Puebla Group, which the charter describes as an enemy and threat to freedom. The letter condemns leftist groups as being under the influence of Cuba, stating that they are "under the umbrella of the Cuban regime", describes part of the region as being "kidnapped by totalitarian communist-inspired regimes, supported by drug trafficking", and says that leftist groups hold an "ideological agenda" to destabilize liberal governments. The letter cites respect for the rule of law, separation of powers, and private property. It called for scholars, the media, and other groups to uphold the objectives of the Madrid Charter.

=== Promotion ===
Delegates of Vox travelled throughout Latin America to promote and obtain signatures for the manifesto, meeting with politicians in Ecuador, Mexico, and Peru. While promoting the charter in Ecuador, Vox delegate Hermann Tertsch said that signatures were necessary to counter "narcosocialism", arguing that "[a]ll Latin American countries are threatened by the same totalitarian project funded mainly by Venezuelan oil and drug trafficking", which Tertsch said was guided by Cuba. At the meetings in Ecuador, Guillermo Lasso's recently-nominated Minister of National Defense Fernando Donoso signed the document along with members of the Social Christian Party and SUMA Party.

In Mexico, the visit and signature collection event by Vox caused controversy when National Action Party (PAN) legislators signed the charter. PAN politicians received criticism on social media that resulted with conflicts within the party. Shortly after participating with Vox, PAN politicians distanced themselves from signing the manifesto, while the party's official Twitter deleted an image of PAN members meeting with Vox representatives. Due to Vox's controversial visit, discussions occurred of Mexico possibly enforcing Article 33 of the Constitution of Mexico, which grants the expulsion of foreign individuals for interfering in Mexican political affairs. Andrés Manuel López Obrador, the president of Mexico, declined this option by stating that "Mexico is a free country. I also say this so that if the gentleman of Vox, Abascal, wants to come again, he can do it. The doors of our country are open, they are always welcome. All foreigners, even if they are opponents."

Peruvian investigative journalism website OjoPúblico wrote in an article discussing far-right alliances in the Americas that members of Vox travelled to Peru to obtain signatures, with the parties Go on Country of Hernando de Soto, Popular Force of Keiko Fujimori, and Popular Renewal of Rafael López Aliaga signing the document. Peruvian business executives, including the owner of Willax Televisión, also participated in discussions and signed the charter. Additionally, Vox created an e-participation initiative in Peru to gather signatures from Peruvian citizens.

=== Signatories ===
Origin	Signatories	Source
Argentina	Alberto Asseff; Alejandro Chafuen; Alejandro Fargosi; Alfredo Schiavoni; Carla Piccolomini; David Schlereth; Diego Marías; Francisco Sánchez; Hernán Berisso; Inés Liendo; Javier Milei; José Luis Espert; Juan Aicega; Julio Sahad; Karina Mariani; Luis Rosales; María Zaldívar; Martín Pugliese; Pablo Kleinman; Pablo Torello; Paola Michielotto; Santiago Muzio; Victoria Villarruel; Waldo Wolff	
Bolivia	Arturo Murillo	
Brazil	Bia Kicis; Eduardo Bolsonaro	
Chile	José Antonio Kast; Vanessa Kaiser	
Colombia	John Marulanda; Margarita Restrepo; María Clara Escobar; María Fernanda Cabal; Paloma Valencia; Paola Holguín	
Costa Rica	Dragos Dolanescu Valenciano; Fabricio Alvarado Muñoz; Otto Guevara Guth	
Cuba	Alejandro González Raga; Antonio Rodiles; Dulce Canal Hernández; Ernesto Ortiz; Hilda Molina; Léo Juvier-Hendrickx; Orlando Gutierrez-Boronat; René Bolio; Rosa Maria Payá; Yaxys Cires; Zoé Valdés	
Ecuador	Amparo Medina; André Santos Espinoza; César E. Benítez; Cristina López; Esteban Torres Cobo; Felipe León; Fernando Balda; Gabriela Weber; Guillermo Lasso (alleged); Héctor Yepes; Henry Kronfle; Jairo Darío Lalaleo Valencia; Luis Espinosa Goded; Mario Cuvi; Mario Pazmiño Silva; Martha Cecilia Villafuerte; Max Meitzner; Otto Sonnenholzner; Pedro Pablo Duart	
El Salvador	Alejandrina Castro	
France	Marion Maréchal	
Greece	Emmanouil Fragkos	
Honduras	Mauricio Villeda	
Italy	Giorgia Meloni; Nicola Procaccini	
Mexico	Alejandra Reynoso Sánchez; América Rangel Lorenzana; Carlos Leal; Eduardo Verástegui; Elsa Méndez Álvarez; Fernando Rodríguez Doval; Gina Cruz Blackledge; Guadalupe Murguía Gutiérrez; María Guadalupe Saldaña Cisneros; Indira Rosales San Román; Juan Antonio Martín del Campo; Julen Rementería del Puerto; Marco Antonio Gama; Mario Romo; Minerva Hernández Ramos; Nadia Navarro Acevedo; Pablo Adame; Raúl Torres Guerrero; Roberto Juan Moya Clemente; Sarai Nuñez Cerón; Víctor Oswaldo Fuentes Solís	
Netherlands	Derk Jan Eppink	
Paraguay	Dannia Ríos; Hugo Vera Ojeda; Tito Aranda; Víctor Pavón	
Peru	Adriana Tudela; Aldo Mariategui; Alejandro Muñante; Alfonso Baella; Ángel Guillermo Delgado Silva; Carlos Hamann; Carmen Patricia Juárez; César Combina; Daniel Córdova; Dardo Lopez-Dolz; Diana Seminario; Diego Acuña; Diethell Columbus; Edgar Callo Wong; Elizabeth Du-Bois Curcio; Elizabeth Dulanto de Miró Quesada; Enrique Ghersi Silva; Erasmo Wong Lu; Ernesto Álvarez Miranda; Ernesto Bustamante; Fabiola Morales; Fernando Cálmele del Solar; Fernando Cillóniz; Francisco Tudela; Gustavo Nakamura; Hernando Guerra García; Javier Bedoya Denegri; Javier González-Olaechea; Jorge Montoya Manrique; Jorge Villena; Jorge Zeballos; José Cueto; José Williams; Juan Bosco Hermoza; Juan Carlos Lizarzaburu; Keiko Fujimori; Luis Galarreta; Maricarmen Alva; Miguel Santamaría Dávila; Miguel Yagi Higa; Nelson Roberto Pardo; Nestor Quizpez-Asin; Noelia Rossvith Herrera Medina; Pedro Olaechea; Rafael López Aliaga; Rosangella Barbarán; Vanya Melissa Thais Iriarte; Victor Andrés Ponce; Yorry Warthon	
Portugal	André Ventura	
Spain	Hermann Tertsch; Jorge Buxadé; Rocío Monasterio; Santiago Abascal	
Sweden	Charlie Weimers	
United States	Alberto Fernández; Alejandro Chafuen; Alfonso Aguilar; Terry Schilling; Dan Schneider; Daniel Garza; Daniel Pipes; Grover Norquist; John Fonte; John Pence; Lorenzo Montanari; Matt Schlapp; Mike González; Pablo Kleinman; Roger Noriega	
Uruguay	Pablo Viana; Pedro Isern	
Venezuela	Alberto Franceschi; Alfredo Mago; Álvaro Guerrero; Antonio Ledezma; Aquiles Martini Pietri; Biagio Pilieri; Carlos Bastardo; Carlos Ortega; Carlos Salazar; Dignora Hernández; Diego Arria; Eduardo Flores; Edwin Luzardo; Enrique Aristeguieta Gramcko; Humberto Calderón Berti; Humberto González; Ignacio de León; Jesús Petit DaCosta; Johanna Montenegro; José Luis Pirela; Juan Carlos Bolívar; Juan Pablo García; Luis Barragán; María Corina Machado; Melquiades Pulido; Milos Alcalay; Nafir Morales; Nahem Reyes; Nitu Pérez Osuna; Noel Álvarez; Omar González Moreno; Pedro Urruchurtu; Richard Blanco; Vladimir Petit Medina; Wilfredo Bello	

== Meetings ==
=== 1st Regional Meeting ===
The 1st Regional Meeting of Foro Madrid was held in Bogotá in February 2022. At the meeting, a group of fifty far-left protesters gathered to denounce the Madrid Forum, some chanting "Bogotá will be the tomb of fascism", with some individuals damaging the exterior of the hotel where the event occurred. Police dispersed the protesters and the forum accused leftist presidential candidate Gustavo Petro of organizing the protests. During the event, the forum emphasized the importance of the upcoming 2022 Colombian presidential election and the 2022 Brazilian general election, saying a threat of "narco-communist threat" loomed over Latin America.

=== 2nd Regional Meeting ===
During the 2nd Regional Meeting of Foro Madrid was held in Lima in March 2023 and was virtually attended by Abascal, who described the Sao Paulo Forum and the Puebla Group as "criminal organizations". The forum also called for the ousting of Petro, who became president of Colombia, stating that the 2022 Colombian presidential election was fraudulent, and alleged that he was aligned with drug traffickers and that Russia interfered with social networks to support him. Conservative Peruvian newspaper El Comercio described the meeting as an event "with some radicalisms for the grandstand and no narrative that promises change from the right", while Wayka described it as a "meeting of the fascist extreme right", and cited Elisabeth Dulanto Baquerizo de Miró Quesada of the family that owns El Comercio Group as one of the attenders; her company helped to host the meeting.

=== 3rd meeting ===
The third meeting was held in September 2024 in Buenos Aires, featuring 40 speakers representing 15 countries with a theme to condemn Nicolás Maduro and "support the Venezuelan people and condemn the lukewarm response of the international community, as well as to recover the spaces of freedom taken away by the criminal left and the non-left in the Western world".

== Analysis ==
France 24 describes the Forum as "an alliance of right and far-right Spanish and Latin American lawmakers". The Spanish newspaper El País wrote: "Fundamentalists (Catholics and Evangelicals), neocons and ultra-liberals, right-wing populists and those nostalgic for military dictatorships make up the anti-communist alliance that the Spanish party Vox is weaving in Latin America." Página 12, a Kirchnerist newspaper edited in Buenos Aires, described the initiative as a "cultural war" declared by Vox and "a conservative offensive on what democratic advances that had or have begun in Latin America at the beginning of this century". Political scientist Kathy Zegarra of the Pontifical Catholic University of Peru discussed Keiko Fujimori's participation with Vox's initiative. She said: "It's beneficial for the far-right public. However, it generates liabilities especially for those citizens who have more tolerant ideas; ... it is negative for those citizens who have more progressive values, who have values in favor of human rights." Khemvirg Puente, a political scientist of the National Autonomous University of Mexico, said that the participation of PAN politicians in the charter was a way for Mexican president Andrés Manuel López Obrador to confirm his rhetoric against the party and that this act moved the party to the far right, making it unattractive to voters. In Peru, prominent heads of businesses, especially in the mining industry, supported the Madrid Forum.

== See also ==
- Conservative Manifesto
