= Fanny Casado =

Peruvian chemist

Fanny Lys Casado Peña
- Born: 1980 (age 45–46); Iquitos, Peru
- Education: Pontifical Catholic University of Peru
- Awards: Gold Medal from the Korea Women Invention Association (2024)
- Scientific career
- Workplaces: Pontifical Catholic University of Peru

Fanny Lys Casado Peña (born 1980, Iquitos) is a Peruvian scientist specializing in toxicology and bioengineering. She serves as a principal professor at the Pontifical Catholic University of Peru and is a principal researcher at the Institute of Omic Sciences and Applied Biotechnology at the same university. She has developed a prototype container for sputum sample collection to prevent contamination in the pre-analytical phase of tuberculosis diagnosis.

Casado Peña has also been recognized as a senior member of the Institute of Electrical and Electronics Engineers (IEEE) and has received the Outstanding Professional Award 2023 from the College of Chemists of Peru.

== Biography ==
Fanny Casado Peña was born in Iquitos and completed her early studies in that city. She later moved to Trujillo and subsequently to Lima, where she finished her secondary education. Her interest in science emerged through the influence of her father, a chemical engineer, and a chemistry teacher who encouraged her to explore the subject in greater depth.

She obtained her Doctor of Philosophy in Toxicology from the University of Rochester, United States, where she also completed a Master of Science. Additionally, she holds a Master of Science in Forest Molecular Genetics and Biotechnology from Michigan Technological University. Prior to this, she earned a bachelor's degree in chemistry from the Pontifical Catholic University of Peru.

== Career ==
After completing her doctorate, Casado pursued postdoctoral research in stem cells and cancer at McMaster University in Canada, and at Johannes Gutenberg University Mainz in Germany. She currently leads interdisciplinary projects focused on implementing safe technologies for people and the environment. Her work integrates methodologies for the design, development, and validation of drugs, cell therapies, and medical devices.

Casado has explored the intersection between bioengineering and medicine, developing technologies to improve human health. One of her projects has been the implementation of a negative pressure therapy system designed to accelerate wound healing in patients with chronic injuries, particularly those with diabetes.

Additionally, she has led studies on the impact of nanomaterials on biological systems, evaluating both their toxicity and their applicability in medical devices and innovative therapies. Her work has contributed to the development of new approaches in the fabrication of biomaterials that balance therapeutic efficacy with biological safety.

She has participated in the development of scientific innovations, including Utility Model Patent No. 001995-2022, a "Semi-Solid Sample Container" designed to enhance the diagnostic process for diseases such as tuberculosis. This project was recognized with the "Academic Innovation Award 2023" from the National Society of Industries.

During the COVID-19 pandemic, she was part of the Masi project, which facilitated the manufacture and donation of over 250 mechanical ventilators to MINSA hospitals. As of 2022, she was leading a laboratory producing ventilators and COVID-19 tests.

In February 2025, Casado was elected to the National Academy of Sciences of Peru (ANC) as an associate member.

== Research ==
Casado work combines toxicology, biotechnology, and bioengineering to address pressing challenges in health and life sciences. Her research focuses on the development of medical devices, infectious disease diagnostics, and translational biotechnologies, with an emphasis on ensuring safety and accessibility for both patients and healthcare systems. She integrates omics methods, materials science, and engineering to design, test, and validate technologies that contribute to both clinical practice and public health innovation.

At the Institute of Omic Sciences and Applied Biotechnology (ICOBA-PUCP), she has led initiatives at the intersection of biomedical engineering and artificial intelligence.

One of her major projects is the creation of the first database of ultrasound images of Peruvian patients, developed in collaboration with the Medical Imaging Laboratory (LIM-PUCP), the University of Rochester, and the National Institute of Neoplastic Diseases.

The initiative seeks to generate artificial intelligence algorithms adapted to the Peruvian population, addressing a gap in medical imaging technology that has historically relied on datasets from foreign populations.

In 2025, Casado assumed a role in a pioneering project between the Pontifical Catholic University of Peru (PUCP), the National Institute of Neoplastic Diseases (INEN), and the University of Rochester to advance early detection of breast cancer in Peru. As principal investigator at the Institute of Omic Sciences and Applied Biotechnology (ICOBA-PUCP), she directs the creation of the country's first database of ultrasound images from Peruvian patients. Casado has stressed that developing region-specific databases is essential to ensure that AI solutions serve the populations in which they will be applied.

She also volunteered for IEEE and Society of Toxicology(SOT) in different positions.

== Selected publications ==
- Casado, Fanny L.; Singh, Kameshwar P.; Gasiewicz, Thomas A. (2011-10-01). "Aryl Hydrocarbon Receptor Activation in Hematopoietic Stem/Progenitor Cells Alters Cell Function and Pathway-Specific Gene Modulation Reflecting Changes in Cellular Trafficking and Migration". Molecular Pharmacology. 80 (4): 673–682. doi:10.1124/mol.111.071381. ISSN 0026-895X. PMC 3187533. PMID 21791576.
- Lee, Jong-Hee; Mitchell, Ryan R.; McNicol, Jamie D.; Shapovalova, Zoya; Laronde, Sarah; Tanasijevic, Borko; Milsom, Chloe; Casado, Fanny; Fiebig-Comyn, Aline; Collins, Tony J.; Singh, Karun K.; Bhatia, Mickie (2015-06-09). "Single Transcription Factor Conversion of Human Blood Fate to NPCs with CNS and PNS Developmental Capacity". Cell Reports. 11 (9): 1367–1376. doi:10.1016/j.celrep.2015.04.056. ISSN 2211-1247. PMID 26004181.
- Casado, Fanny L. (2016). "The Aryl Hydrocarbon Receptor Relays Metabolic Signals to Promote Cellular Regeneration". Stem Cells International. 2016 (1) 4389802. doi:10.1155/2016/4389802. ISSN 1687-9678. PMC 4987465. PMID 27563312.
- Naemi, Roozbeh; Romero Gutierrez, Stefano E.; Allan, David; Flores, Gilmer; Ormaechea, Juvenal; Gutierrez, Evelyn; Casado-Pena, Jessica; Anyosa-Zavaleta, Sharon; Juarez, Mauricio; Casado, Fanny; Castaneda Aphan, Benjamin (2022-03-01). "Diabetes Status is Associated With Plantar Soft Tissue Stiffness Measured Using Ultrasound Reverberant Shear Wave Elastography Approach". Journal of Diabetes Science and Technology. 16 (2): 478–490. doi:10.1177/1932296820965259. ISSN 1932-2968. PMC 8861805. PMID 33095039.
- Chang, Javier; Acosta, Augusto; Benavides-Aspiazu, Jorge; Reategui, Jaime; Rojas, Christiam; Cook, Jordi; Nole, Richard; Giampietri, Luigi; Pérez-Buitrago, Sandra; Casado, Fanny L.; Castaneda, Benjamin (2021-04-01). "Masi: A mechanical ventilator based on a manual resuscitator with telemedicine capabilities for patients with ARDS during the COVID-19 crisis". HardwareX. 9 e00187. doi:10.1016/j.ohx.2021.e00187. ISSN 2468-0672. PMC 7925236. PMID 33681539.
- Marin, Laura; Casado, Fanny (2023-06-22). "Prediction of prostate cancer biochemical recurrence by using discretization supports the critical contribution of the extra-cellular matrix genes". Scientific Reports. 13 (1): 10144. Bibcode:2023NatSR..1310144M. doi:10.1038/s41598-023-35821-1. ISSN 2045-2322. PMC 10287745. PMID 37349324.

=== Chapters ===
- Gonzalez, Eduardo; Casado, Fanny L.; Castaneda, Benjamin (2019-11-27). "Chapter 3: Clinical applications of elastographic methods to improve prostate cancer evaluation". In Alam, S. Kaisar; Garra, Brian S. (eds.). Tissue Elasticity Imaging: Volume 2: Clinical Applications. Elsevier. pp. 47–66. ISBN 978-0-12-809684-0.

== Awards ==
- Gold Medal, Korea Women Invention Association (2024)
- Silver Medal, International Exhibition of Inventions of Geneva (2022)
- Academic Innovation Award 2023 - First Place, Peru's National Society of Industries
- Mondialogo Engineering Award – Honorable Mention, awarded by UNESCO and Daimler-Chrysler
- 2019 Research Recognition Award, Pontifical Catholic University of Peru
- 2020 Research Recognition Award, Pontifical Catholic University of Peru
- 2018 University Teaching Innovation Award
