= 1872 Peruvian presidential election =

- May 1872
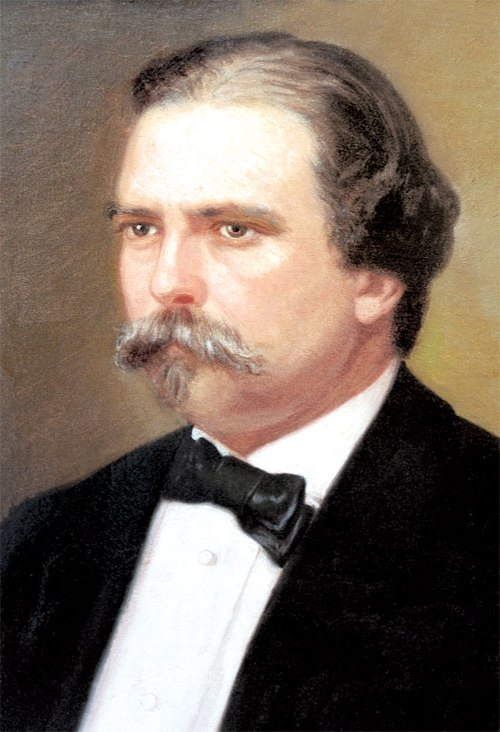

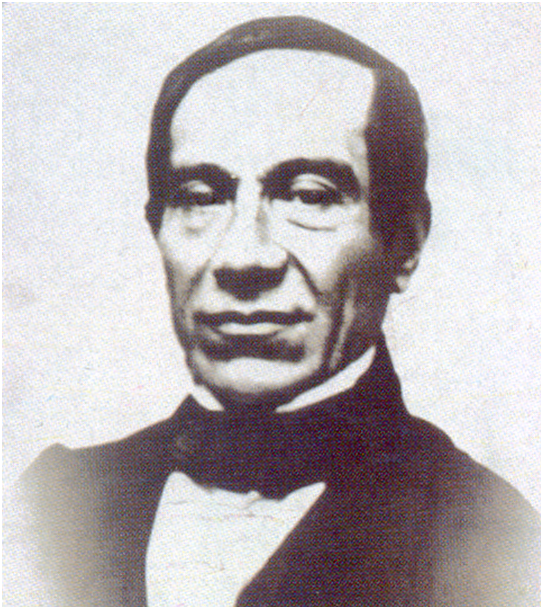

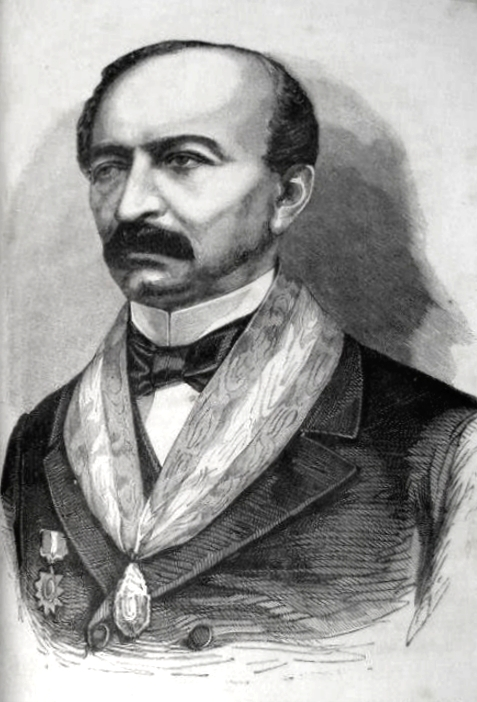
Candidate	Manuel Pardo	Antonio Arenas	Manuel Toribio Ureta
Party	Civilista Party		Civilista Party
Electoral vote	2,706
Percentage	69.35%
President before election
Mariano Herencia Zevallos
Elected President
Manuel Pardo
Civilista Party

Presidential elections were held in Peru in May 1872. Manuel Pardo of the Civilista Party was elected with 69% of the vote, becoming the first civilian to be elected to the presidency and the first opposition candidate to win a presidential election in Peru.

They have been described as the first free and fair elections in Peruvian history.

== Electoral system ==
The elections were indirect, with the president elected by the electoral colleges elected on 15 October 1871.

== Results ==
Candidate	Party	Votes	%
Manuel Pardo	Civilista Party	2,706	69.35
Antonio Arenas		1,196	30.65
Manuel Toribio Ureta	Civilista Party	1,196	30.65
Total		3,902	100.00
Source: Mücke

== Aftermath ==
Following the elections, Congress was to meet in August to ratify the results. Outgoing president José Balta was overthrown on 22 July in a coup led by Tomás Gutiérrez aimed at preventing Pardo from taking office. Both Balta and Gutiérrez were killed four days later. Gutiérrez was succeeded as president by Francisco Diez Canseco, who was in office for only one day before being replaced by Mariano Herencia Zevallos, who served as interim president until Pardo took office on 2 August.
