= Ribeyro =

Ribeyro is a surname. Notable people with the surname include:

- Héctor García Ribeyro (1909–1963), Peruvian politician
- Juan Antonio Ribeyro Estrada (1810–1886), Peruvian politician
- Julio Ramón Ribeyro (1929–1994), Peruvian writer

== See also ==
- Ribeiro
