= National Society of Industries (Peru) =

- Abbreviation: SNI
- Formation: June 12, 1986; 40 years ago
- Type: Employers' organization
- Headquarters: Lima
- President: Jesús Salazar Nishi
- Website: https://sni.org.pe/

The National Society of Industries (Spanish: Sociedad Nacional de Industrias - SNI) is a private organization that brings together the business community of the Peruvian manufacturing industry.

== History ==
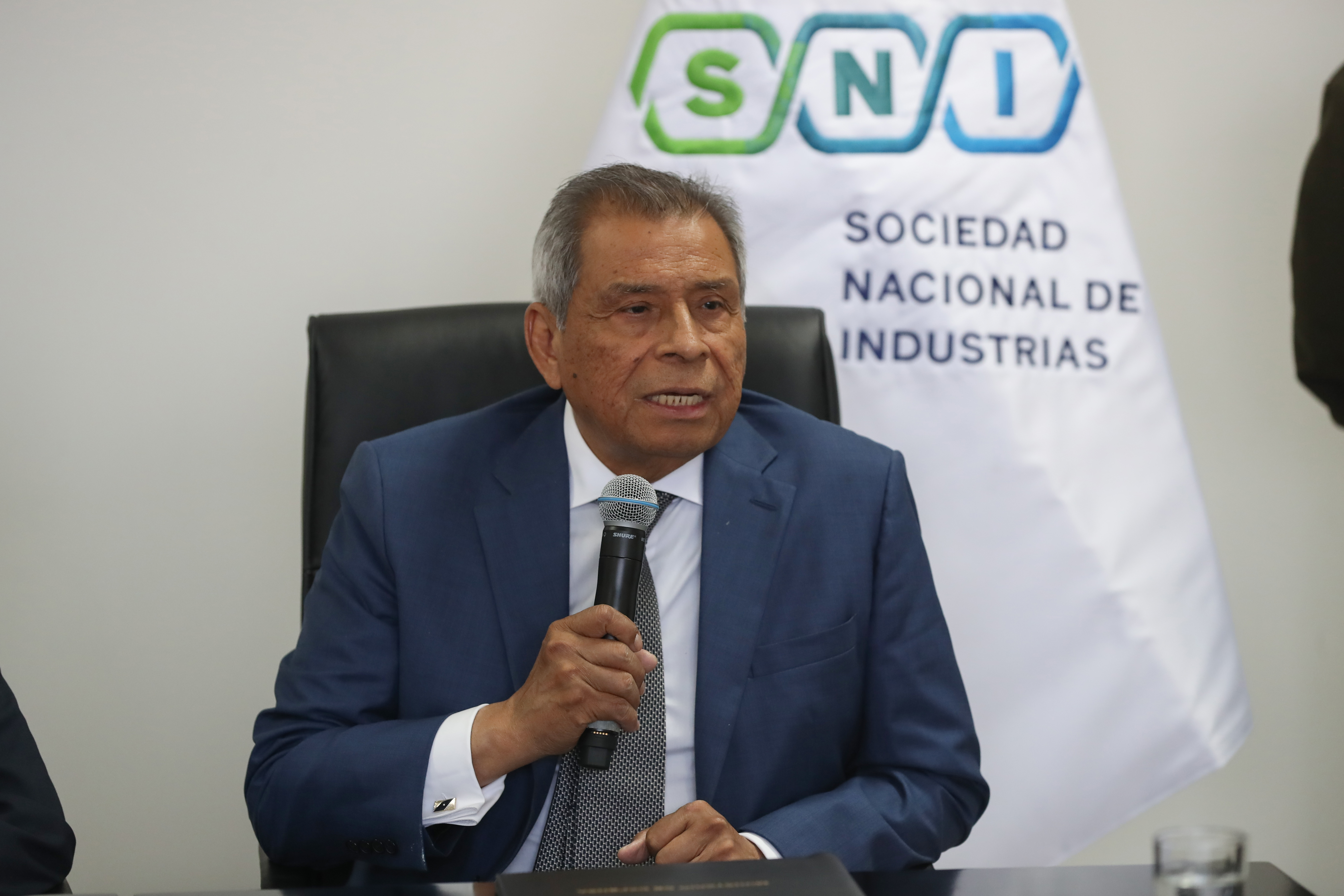
Ricardo Márquez Flores, former president of the SNI

The SNI was promoted by Nicolás de Piérola, President of Peru. It was founded on 13 June 1896. The first president of the society was Juan Revoredo. The SNI is headquartered in Lima and has regional branches in the cities of Arequipa, Trujillo, Huancayo, and Chiclayo.

In September 2021, leaders of the SNI, the Union of Multimodal Transport Guilds of Peru (UGTRANM), political leaders, and other business executives began to meet as the "Brotherhood of Pisco" and planned various actions, including funding transportation strikes in order to destabilize the government of Pedro Castillo and prompt his removal. In October 2021, the website El Foco released recordings revealing a leaked WhatsApp group chat, with Bruno Alecchi of the Permanent Transport Committee of the SNI forwarding messages from UGTRANM leader Geovani Rafael Diez Villegas about a transportation strike organized for 8 November 2021 and shared ideas of support, with the president of the SNI and former Vice President of Peru under Alberto Fujimori, Ricardo Márquez Flores, being mentioned in the chat. Planners were also discussing proposals to pay for protests and the purchase of media to support their effort to remove Castillo from office. El Foco reported that they discovered a Fujimorist named Vanya Thais who created the "Freedom Project" media operation had also been in contact with the group after they planned to fund her project. After the messages were leaked, further leaks showed that members of the group chat warned to leave the group because of media monitoring. The SNI later released a statement that the personal opinions of individuals in their organization did not represent the entity as a whole.

In June 2022, Jesús Salazar Nishi replaced Márquez Flores as president of the SNI.

== Organization ==
The group contains 58 committees that relate to various sectors of the manufacturing industry, including committees related to food and beverage, chemicals, paper, telecommunications, metal, plastic, textile, and footwear, among others.

== Presidents ==
The presidents of the society are elected by its members and have been as follows:

- Juan Revoredo Cruces (1896–1899)
- Federico Pezet y Tirado (1899–1901)
- José Payán y Reyna (1901–1915)
- Gio Batta Isola (1915–1924)
- Ricardo Tizón y Bueno (1924–1925)
- Reginald Ashton (1925–1926)
- Ricardo Tizón y Bueno (1926–1929)
- Jesse Robert Wakeham (1929–1930)
- Agusto Maurer (1930–1949)
- Carlos Díaz-Ufano (1950–1958)
- Alfonso Montero Muelle (1958–1961)
- Pablo Carriquiry Maurer (1961–1963)
- Santiago Gerbolini Isola (1963–1965)
- Jorge Ferrand Inurritegui (1965–1967)
- Gonzalo Raffo Uzátegui (1967–1969)
- Eduardo Dibós Chappuis (1969–1970)
- Alfredo Ostoja Diminich (1970–1972)
- Raymundo Duharte Castre (1972–1973)
- Juan Tudela Bentín (1973–1977)
- José Antonio Aguirre Roca (1977–1979)
- Alfredo Ferrand (1979–1981)
- Ernesto Lanatta Piaggio (1981–1983)
- Carlos Verme Katz (1983–1985)
- Miguel Vega Alvear (1985–1987)
- Gabriel Lanatta Piaggio (1987–1989)
- Salvador Majluf Poza (1989–1991)
- Luis Vega Monteferri (1991–1993)
- Ricardo Márquez Flores (1993–1994)
- Roberto Niesta Brero (1994–1995)
- Eduardo Farah Hayn (1995–1998)
- Emilo Navarro Castañeda (1998–2000)
- Manuel Guillén Yzaga Salazar (2000–2002)
- Roberto Niesta Brero (2002–2004)
- George Schofield Bonello (2004–2006)
- Eduardo Farah Hayn (2006–2009)
- Pedro Carlos Olaechea Álvarez Calderón (2009–2012)
- Luis Salazar Steiger (2012–2015)
- Andreas von Wedemeyer Knigge (2015–2018)
- Ricardo Márquez Flores (2018–2022)
- Jesús Salazar Nishi (2022–2024)

== See also ==
- Confederación General de Trabajadores del Perú (CGTP)
