= Francisco Tudela =

Peruvian politician (born 1955)

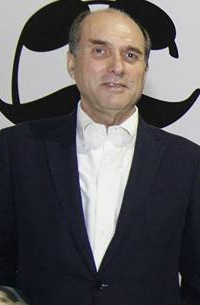
- Tudela in 2015

President of Congress
- Acting; 30 November 2000 – 5 December 2000
- Vice President: 1st Vice President Vacant; 2nd Vice President Vacant; 3rd Vice President Vacant
- Preceded by: Luz Salgado (a.i.)
- Succeeded by: Carlos Ferrero

First Vice President of Peru
- In office 28 July 2000 – 21 November 2000
- President: Alberto Fujimori
- Preceded by: Ricardo Márquez Flores
- Succeeded by: Raúl Diez Canseco (Note: 2001)

Minister of Foreign Affairs
- In office 28 July 1995 – 17 July 1997
- President: Alberto Fujimori
- Preceded by: Efraín Goldenberg
- Succeeded by: Eduardo Ferrero Costa

Permanent Representative of Peru to the United Nations
- In office 1 March 1999 – 1 March 2000
- President: Alberto Fujimori
- Preceded by: Fernando Guillén Salas
- Succeeded by: Jorge Luis Valdez Carrillo

Member of Congress
- In office 26 July 2000 – 26 July 2001
- Constituency: National

Member of the Democratic Constituent Congress
- In office 26 November 1992 – 26 July 1995
- Constituency: National

Personal details
- Born: Francisco Antonio Gregorio Tudela van Breugel-Douglas; 20 July 1955 (age 71) Lima, Peru
- Party: National Renewal
- Other political affiliations: Cambio 90 (non-affiliated member); Peru 2000
- Spouse: Lucila Gutiérrez Murguia
- Children: Adriana Tudela (daughter); Felipe Tudela (son)
- Occupation: Politician
- Profession: Diplomat

Francisco Antonio Gregorio Tudela van Breugel-Douglas (born 20 July 1955) is a Peruvian scholar, diplomat and politician. A former Fujimorist politician and diplomat, he briefly served as the First Vice President of Peru between 28 July 2000 to 21 November 2000, during the brief third term of Alberto Fujimori and also as a Congressman between 2000 and 2001. He also served as Minister of Foreign Affairs during the Fujimori administration and as a member of the Democratic Constituent Congress between 1992 and 1995.

== Early life and education ==
The first of three children, Tudela was born in Lima into an upper class family. His father, Felipe Tudela y Barreda, served as ambassador and his grandfather was a Prime Minister. His mother was jonkvrouw Vera van Breugel Douglas (1929–†), daughter of the baron Casper van Breugel Douglas (1896–1982, member of the Dutch nobility), first Netherlands Ambassador accredited to the Soviet Union. Tudela has Romanian roots on his maternal side.

He studied at Colegio Maristas San Isidro, the Pontifical and Civil Theological Faculty of Lima and the Pontificia Universidad Católica del Perú (PUCP), where he obtained an LL.B. in 1983. Next year, after working briefly at the Institute of Liberty and Democracy, Tudela moved to the University of Navarra (Spain), where he was an assistant professor at the law department (theory of state and constitutional law courses). He obtained an LL.M. in international law and regulation of financial markets from the London School of Economics and Political Science in 1988.

In 1990, he entered the Pontifical Catholic University of Peru. He was professor of international economic law, theory of state and contemporary international relations in the Master in International Law and a founding member of the Institute of International Studies (IDEI). Between 1997 and 1998, Tudela was a visiting scholar at the David Rockefeller Center for Latin American Studies and a fellow of the Weatherhead Center for International Affairs at Harvard.

He was also a lecturer at the Peruvian Naval War College, the Peruvian Army War College and the U.S. Army War College, Carlisle.

== Political career ==
=== Early political career ===
In 1992, Tudela was elected as a member of the Democratic Constituent Congress and served between 1992 and 1995 under the National Renewal party of Rafael Rey.

=== Minister of Foreign Affairs ===
He was one of Alberto Fujimori's foreign ministers during his second term, serving from 1995 until 1997. As Minister of Foreign Affairs, he personally led the peace negotiations with Ecuador, managing to definitively agree with Ecuador, in Quito, on 23 February 1996, the position of that neighboring nation regarding its limits with Peru through the exchange of notes. containing the "remaining impasses" between both countries. It also managed to agree between the parties, in Buenos Aires, on 19 June 1996, the role of the guarantor countries of the Rio de Janeiro Protocol, which would be governed exclusively within the terms of the treaty. On 29 October 1996, in Santiago de Chile, it agreed with Ecuador and the guarantor countries that the talks for the demarcation of the Peruvian-Ecuadorian border would be in accordance with the clauses of the Protocol of Rio de Janeiro of 1942, thus recognizing for the first time since 1952 the full validity of the Peruvian-Ecuadorian boundary treaty. He resigned from the Ministry in July 1997, after the revelation "of an intense activity of telephone espionage to opponents and people of the Government. Among the latter, Tudela himself." Apparently all this was not enough since it did not prevent him from accompanying Fujimori as vice president, on the presidential list for his second re-election in the 2000 elections.

==== Japanese embassy hostage crisis ====
While serving as Foreign Affairs Minister, Tudela was held hostage for 126 days during the 1996–97 Japanese embassy hostage crisis.

=== First Vice President of Peru and Congressman ===
In the 2000 general election, he was elected as First Vice President of Peru in the Peru 2000 ticket of Alberto Fujimori who triumphed in his second re-election with almost 3/4 of the vote amid public discontent and was also elected Congressman at the same time with 840,943 votes, the highest voted congressman of the year, and served as First Vice President of Peru from 28 July 2000 until resigning from the post and breaking with Fujimori in October of that year in protest at the conditions for the holding of the 2001 general elections, which included an amnesty for the military and the return to Peru of the adviser Montesinos.

Tudela's resignation was accepted by Congress in November 2000. Fujimori's resignation had not previously been accepted and he was stripped of the presidency due to moral incapacity and abandonment of office. The fall of Fujimori dragged down his vice presidents.

In November 2000, before the resignation of the vice presidents of Congress, Tudela was in charge of directing the parliament until the election of the new vice presidents, as he was the most voted Congressman of the most voted Party.

=== Permanent Representative to the United Nations ===
In 1999, he was appointed Permanent Representative of Peru to the United Nations, serving in that position and as president of the Latin American Group (GRULA) at the UN until 2000.

=== Later career ===
Tudela is a member of the Madrid Forum, an international alliance organized by Spanish political party Vox that comprises right-wing and far-right individuals.

== Academic career ==
He has been a professor at the Pontifical Catholic University of Peru, in which he has taught International Economic Law, International Relations and Theory of the Contemporary State in master's degrees.

From September 1997 to September 1998, he was a Fellow of the Weatherhead Center for International Affairs at Harvard University.

In 1997, he was appointed Director of the Institute of International Studies of the Pontificia Universidad Católica del Perú, a position he held until 2000.

On 4 September 1997, the National University of Piura conferred on him the degree of Doctor Honoris Causa for the important services rendered to Peru as Minister of Foreign Relations.

In November 1997 he transferred to Harvard University, in Cambridge, Massachusetts, where he was a visiting scholar at the David Rockefeller Center for Latin American Studies. The following year he was appointed Fellow of the Weatherhead Center for International Affairs of the same university. He was also a lecturer at the United States War College, Carlisle Barracks, Pennsylvania.

In 2003, Tudela moved to Santiago de Chile, where he worked as an advisor on the reform of the Diego Portales University. He was also associated with Estudio Ferrada y Coddu.

He served as Professor of International Relations at the University of Development, Security and Defense of the European Union at the University of the Andes and of Public International Law at the Pontificia Universidad Católica de Chile. He was also Director of the Master in Diplomacy at the Finis Terrae University.

He is an honorary member of the Chilean Academy of Political and Moral Sciences.

== Notes ==
Political offices
Preceded by Ricardo Márquez Flores	First Vice President of Peru; July – November 2000	Succeeded by Raúl Diez Canseco
