= Manuel Pardo (politician) =

President of Peru from 1872 to 1876

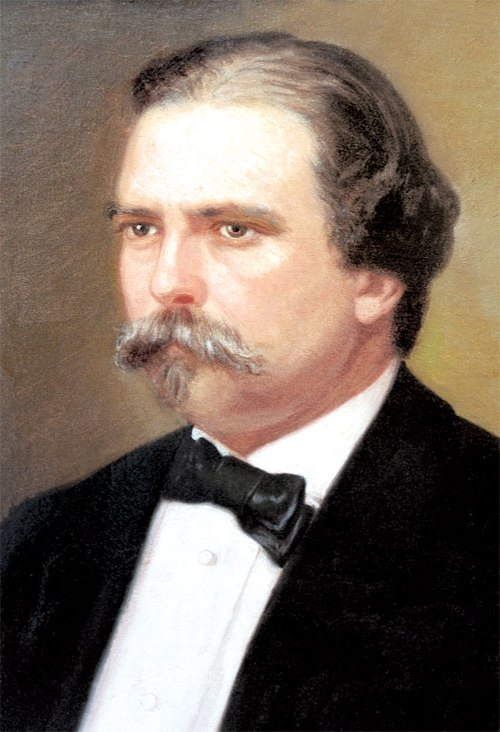

President of Peru
- In office 2 August 1872 – 2 August 1876
- Prime Minister: José Miguel Medina; José Eusebio Sánchez Pedraza; José de la Riva-Agüero y Looz-Corswarem; Nicolás Freire González
- Vice President: Manuel Costas Arce; Francisco Garmendia Puértolas
- Preceded by: Mariano Herencia Zevallos
- Succeeded by: Mariano Ignacio Prado

Personal details
- Born: 9 August 1834
- Died: 16 November 1878 (aged 44)
- Party: Civilista Party
- Profession: Economist

Manuel Justo Pardo y Lavalle (9 August 1834 – 16 November 1878) was a Peruvian politician who served as President of Peru from 1872 to 1876, and was the first civilian president in Peru's history. Prior to his presidency he was Minister of Finance from 1865 to 1867, and mayor of Lima from 1869 to 1870.

Pardo attempted to use guano wealth to fund railroad construction across Peru, but the supply of guano was depleted and an economic crisis broke out in Peru. Pardo was assassinated by a soldier while serving as President of the Senate. His son, José Pardo y Barreda, also served as president.

== Early career ==
Pardo was Minister of Finance from 1865 to 1867. Pardo was director of Public-Benefit Society of Lima in 1868. Pardo became the mayor of Lima with the support of President José Balta and served from 1869 to 1870. Sitting municipal authorities could not be presidential candidates as those officials were tasked with distributing polling cards; Pardo stepped down as mayor in October 1870.

== Presidential election ==
The Sociedad Independencia Electoral, which later became the Civilista Party, was founded by Pardo on 24 April 1871. Electoral clubs supporting Pardo were organised in 156 towns and villages. The SIE had 15,000 members by June 1871. Pardo personally led his campaign across the country and sent 634 letters from 1 May to 5 July, and 381 letters from 12—27 July. Pardo spent 60,000 soles, worth one-tenth of his fortune, on the campaign and two-thirds of this was spent in October 1871 alone.

Printing presses were acquired in major cities to support Pardo's campaign. The city of Cuzco had four printing presses, with three controlled by Pardo's opponents and one that was difficult to rent. Pardo bought a printing press and had it transported to Cuzco by mule.

Voters elected delegates in October 1871, who would then go on to elect congressmen in November, and then the president in May 1872. For the presidential election the delegates met in the capital of their province. Balta opposed Pardo, but Pardo was supported by the majority of Congress. Pardo received 69% of the delegate vote in the election. He received 83% of the vote in the north, 86% in the centre, and 52% in the south. Pardo was the first civilian to serve as president of Peru.

The Gutiérrez brothers, who controlled the 7,000 strong Peruvian army, attempted to overthrow the government and appoint Tomás Gutiérrez as chief of the Republic. Congress, including opponents of Pardo, passed a resolution condemning the coup and calling for the population to fight against it. The Peruvian navy opposed the coup and gave Pardo refuge on a ship. The coup failed on 27 July 1872, after clashes between armed civilians and the army. Pardo was inaugurated on 2 August.

== Presidency ==
The Guardia Nacional, a national police force, was founded by Pardo in November 1872.

Guano produced an economic boom in Peru after its use as a fertilizer was discovered. Pardo wanted to connect the Peruvian interior and coastline via railroads using revenue from guano. Henry Meiggs was hired to construct railroads across the Andes Mountains. Meiggs constructed a railroad from Arequipa to the coast and was then given a $27 million contract to build the 138 mile Central Trans-Andean Railway from Callao to La Oroya. The project went overbudget and the government borrowed against future guano revenue to fund it. Only 87 miles of track were completed by 1875 after the guano reserves were emptied.

Pardo attempted to reduce government expenditures by reducing the military budget and ending subsidies to primary schools, which would now be funded solely by municipalities.

Peru had the second-highest foreign debt in the world by 1875, only behind the Ottoman Empire.

A secret mutual defence treaty was signed between Peru and Bolivia in 1873, and this resulted in Peru being called to fight in the War of the Pacific in 1879.

Pardo wanted the Civilista Party to give its presidential nomination to Mariano Ignacio Prado for the 1876 election, but Lizardo Montero Flores received the nomination instead. However, Prado won the election.

== Later life and legacy ==
In 1877, Pardo was elected President of the Senate. On 16 November 1878, Pardo was assassinated by gunshot. His assassin was a soldier who was afraid that a law currently under debate would prevent him from being promoted.

Prado's son José Pardo y Barreda became president in 1904 after the death of President Serapio Calderón.

== Personal life ==
His sons were José Simón Pardo y Barreda, Prime-Minister and also President of Peru, Felipe Pardo y Barreda, V Marquis of Fuente Hermosa de Miranda, and Juan Pardo y Barreda, President of the Chamber of Deputies of Peru.

== Works cited ==
=== Books ===
- Aguirre, Carlos (2005). The Criminals of Lima and Their Worlds: The Prison Experience, 1850-1935. Duke University Press. ISBN 9780822386438.
- Diamond, Larry; Linz, Juan; Lipset, Seymour, eds. (1989). Democracy In Developing Countries: Latin America. Vol. 4. Lynne Rienner Publishers. ISBN 1555870430.
- Henderson, Peter (2013). The Course of Andean History. University of New Mexico Press. ISBN 9780826353375.
- Vergara, Alberto; Drinot, Paulo, eds. (2025). Modern Peru: A New History. Duke University Press. ISBN 9781478061380.

=== Journals ===
- Mücke, Ulrich (2001). "Elections and Political Participation in Nineteenth-Century Peru: The 1871-72 Presidential Campaign". Journal of Latin American Studies. 33 (2). Cambridge University Press: 311–346. doi:10.2307/3653687. JSTOR 3653687.

Political offices
Preceded by Francisco Rosas Balcázar	President of the Senate of Peru; 1878	Succeeded by José Antonio García y García
Preceded by Mariano Herencia Zevallos	President of Peru; 1872–1876	Succeeded by Mariano Ignacio Prado
