= Francisco Valdivieso y Prada =

Peruvian politician and lawyer (1773–1829)

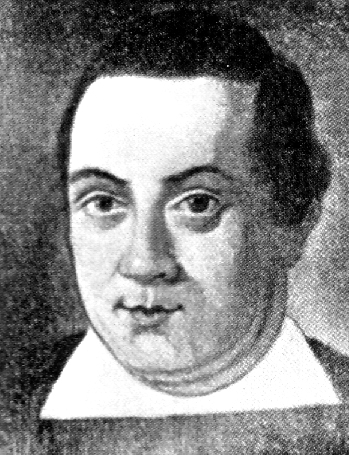

Personal details
- Born: Francisco de Paula Valdivieso y Prada; January 10, 1773 Lima, Peru
- Died: June 9, 1828 (aged 55) Lima, Peru
- Education: University of San Marcos

Francisco de Paula Valdivieso y Prada (10 January 1773, Lima – 9 June 1828 in Lima) was a Peruvian lawyer, magistrate and politician. He was Minister of Government and Foreign Relations from 1822 to 1824, president of the Supreme Court in 1825, and president of the General Constituent Congress in 1827.

== Early life and career ==
Valdivieso was born in Lima to Miguel de Valdivieso y Torrejón, a notable jurist and writer from Lima, and Isabel de Prada y Huidobro. He studied at the Real Convictorio de San Carlos. After opting for the degree of Doctor of Arts and Theology, he went on to practice as Professor of Arts at the University of San Marcos in 1791. He then graduated from San Carlos specializing in Canon law in 1796, where he served as vice-rector and regent for the studies of Philosophy and Theology in 1797. He was received as a lawyer before the Real Audiencia of Lima on October 3, 1797. During his lifetime, he obtained a high reputation for his high knowledge and judgment.

He traveled to Spain in 1807 and returned to Peru in 1811, resuming his functions in the government. He traveled again to Spain in 1813 when one of the two deputies for Lima was elected to the Cortes of Spain, with the other being the Marquis of Torre Tagle. After a discreet performance, he was appointed judge of the Real Audiencia of Santiago in 1815. He embarked in Cádiz in April 1817 and arrived in Callao in September of that year, but could not continue his journey to Chile because of an illness.

With the arrival of the Liberating Expedition commanded by José de San Martín, many upper-class citizens of Lima joined the pro-independence cause. Valdivieso signed the act of Declaration of Independence that the people of Lima approved in a cabildo abierto on July 15, 1821. By order of the protective government of San Martín, he was appointed to the High Chamber of Justice and also became a member of the Junta de Secuestros, responsible for managing the property of royalists who had fled the city. Soon after, he was given sole responsibility for this task and was appointed as the exclusive judge of kidnappings. On January 10, 1822 he was incorporated into the Patriotic Society, in whose bosom he acted as censor, along with Francisco Xavier de Luna Pizarro.

He was appointed Minister of Government and Foreign Affairs of Peru, a position he held from July 22, 1822 to July 17, 1823. On July 25, 1822, he ordered the expulsion of Minister Bernardo de Monteagudo after complaints of his rule in Lima. He temporarily served as Minister of Finance, from September 21, 1822 to April 2, 1823.

After the deposition of President José de la Riva Agüero, he was authorized by the Constituent Congress to exercise the Executive Power temporarily in places unaffected by the war, while Venezuelan General Antonio José de Sucre, lieutenant of Simón Bolívar, exercised military power. This provisional mandate lasted from June 23 until July 17, 1823, when José Bernardo de Tagle assumed the presidency.

After the Peruvian victory in Junín and Ayacucho, Valdivieso was appointed a member of the Supreme Court of Justice whose presidency he came to exercise in 1825. He also integrated a commission to which the drafting of Civil Code and Penal Code projects was entrusted. He was awarded the civic medal with the bust of Bolívar on October 10, 1825. On April 11, 1826, he contributed to the approval of the death sentences handed down against Juan de Berindoaga and Pablo Terón for the alleged crime of treason after secretly negotiating with the royalists during the war against Spain.

In 1827 he was elected deputy for Lima and joined the General Constituent Congress, whose presidency he held from August 4 to October 4, 1827, replacing Francisco Xavier de Luna Pizarro.

He died in Lima on June 9, 1828.

== See also ==
- Peruvian War of Independence

Political offices
Preceded by José de la Riva Agüero	Interim President of Peru; 1823	Succeeded by José Bernardo de Tagle
