= Vice President of Peru =

Second-highest constitutional office in Peru

First Vice President and Second Vice President of the Republic of Peru
- Primer Vicepresidente Constitucional de la República; Segundo Vicepresidente Constitucional de la República
- Great Seal of the State

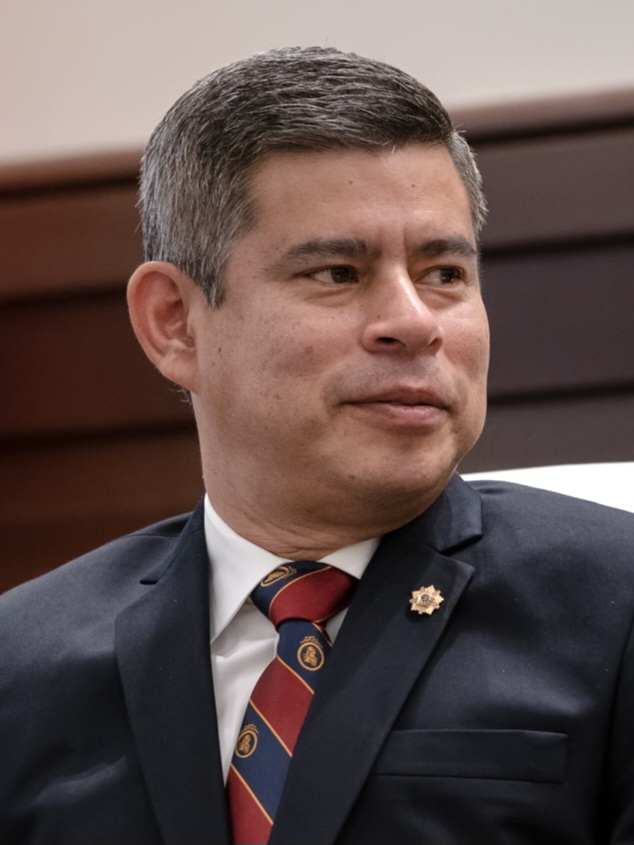
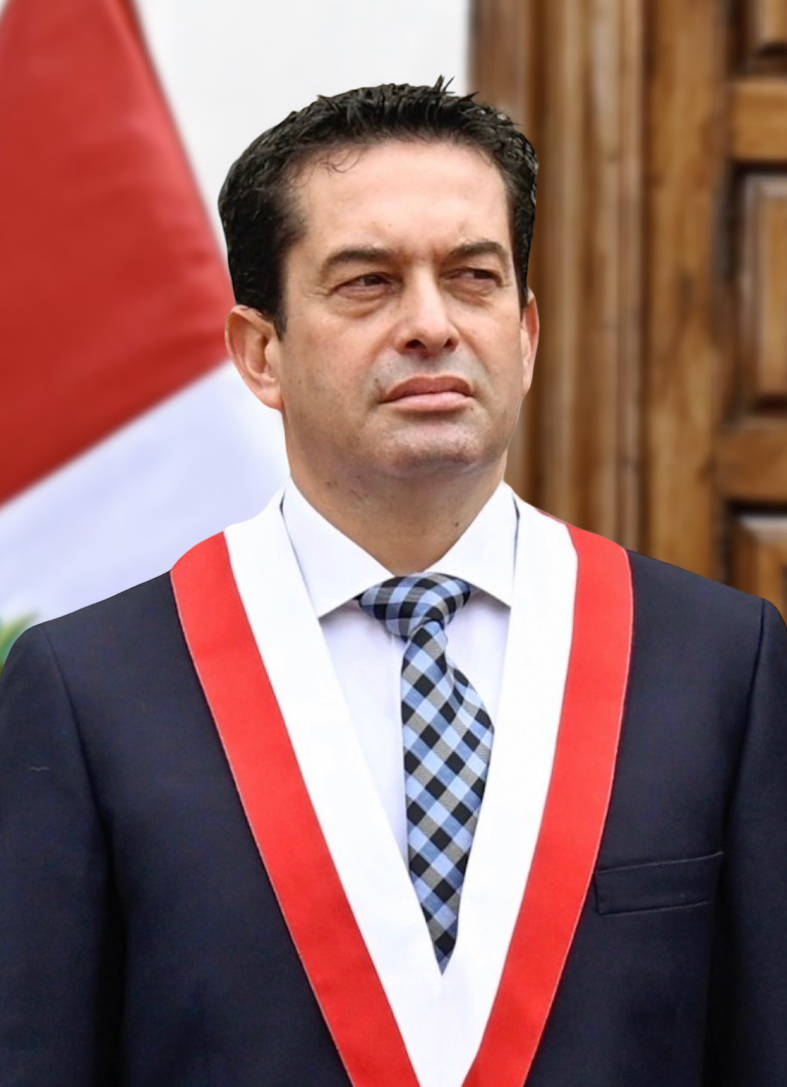
- Incumbent; First Vice President: Luis Galarreta; Second Vice President: Miki Torres since 28 July 2026
- Residence: Government Palace
- Appointer: Only direct popular election
- Term length: Five years, renewable non-consecutively
- Inaugural holder: Diego de Aliaga (1823); Juan Antonio Pezet and Pedro Diez Canseco (1862)
- Formation: 1823 (Vice President); 1862 (First Vice President and Second Vice President)
- Succession: First and Second

The Republic of Peru has two vice presidents, the first vice president and the second vice president, who are elected along with the president in democratic elections. Their only constitutional mission is to replace the president in case of death, permanent or temporary incapacity, resignation, being abroad without the permission of Congress, failure to return from abroad at fixed time, and/or dismissal or removal from office as allowed by the Constitution. (Note: While the Constitution itself does not give the vice presidents any role beyond deputizing the president, according to the Organic Law of the Executive Branch, however, the vice presidents can participate in the sessions and debates of the Council of Ministers "with voice but without vote", can fulfil additional functions that the president entrusts and assigns to them, and are also part of the presidential office's support staff.) They cannot be appointed outside of general elections.

The first and second vice presidents are first and second in the presidential line of succession. The leader of Congress, the president of the Congress, follows the first vice president and the second vice president in the line of succession.

In modern Peruvian history, two vice presidents have acceded to the presidency after the president could no longer serve, Martín Vizcarra and Dina Boluarte. Martín Vizcarra assumed the office of the presidency in 2018 after the graft scandal that led to the resignation of President Pedro Pablo Kuczynski. Dina Boluarte assumed the office of the presidency in 2022 after President Pedro Castillo attempted to dissolve Congress and was impeached and removed from the presidency.

Historically, the position was one of a sole vice president, which was in place in the years 1829–1831 and 1858–1862. The dual positions of first and second vice presidents have been in place since 1862.

The office of the first vice president is currently held by Luis Galareta. The office of the second vice president is currently held by Miki Torres.

== History ==
=== Vice president ===
The position of vice president of Peru appeared for the first time in the Constitution of 1823:

"ARTICLE 76: There will be a Vice President in whom the same qualities concur. He/she will administer and withhold Executive Power in event of the death, resignation, or impeachment of the President, or when the president is unable to control the armed forces." Constitution of 1823

The Constitution of 1828 and the Life Constitution of 1826 also proposed only one vice president, who had to be appointed by the president. In the Constitution of 1834, the office was disbanded until the Magna Carta of 1856, which reinstated the sole vice-presidency.

=== First and second vice presidents ===
The Constitution of 1860 established two vice-presidents, elected jointly with the president.

Article 89: "There will be two Vice Presidents of the Republic, named first and second, who will be elected at the same time, with the same qualities and for the same period as the President. Constitution of 1860

In the Constitution of 1867, the power of vice-presidents was eminently curtailed. However, this constitution held in place for a short period until a successful revolution of that same year restored the Constitution of 1860.

Similarly, the Constitution of 1920 abolished the positions of vice-presidents. The Constitution of 1933 failed to change this, but the office was eventually restored by the second presidency of Óscar R. Benavides, by law on 1 April 1936. In 1939, via plebiscitary consultation, a constitutional amendment was made restoring the office of vice president and second vice president.

The 1993 Constitution and the current constitution in force — put forth by President Alberto Fujimori — recognizes the double vice-presidency in the Executive Branch.

In recent history, there have been two instances where the first vice president has acceded to the presidency after the president could no longer serve. Martín Vizcarra assumed the office of the presidency in 2018 after the graft scandal that led to the resignation of President Pedro Pablo Kuczynski. Dina Boluarte assumed the office of the presidency in 2022 after President Pedro Castillo attempted to dissolve Congress and was impeached and removed from the presidency. No second vice president has recently acceded to the presidency.

== Current officeholders ==
The office of the first vice president is currently vacant. The most recent first vice president is Dina Boluarte, who held the office until 7 December 2022 after President Pedro Castillo's self-coup d'état attempt and removal from the presidency. The office of the second vice president is also currently vacant because Castillo's second running mate, Vladimir Cerrón, was disqualified by the National Jury of Elections to run as second vice president in the 2021 election due to Cerrón having served a prison sentence for corruption since 2019.

The most recent second vice president is Mercedes Aráoz, who held the office until her resignation was accepted by Congress on 7 May 2020. Earlier, on 30 September 2019, the Peruvian Congress had been in the midst of the 2019 Peruvian constitutional crisis and named Aráoz as Acting President after having declared President Martín Vizcarra unfit for office. Given that Congress had itself been dissolved earlier that day by President Vizcarra and that Aráoz supported the Vizcarra's call for new congressional elections, she irrevocably resigned as second vice president on 1 October 2019, to leave Vizcarra as the sole claimant to the presidency. Aráoz's resignation was not accepted until 7 May 2020, by a newly elected Congress.

== List of vice presidents of Peru ==
=== Sole vice president: 1820-1860 ===
Vice President	Term of Office		Election	President
Vice President	Start of Term	End of Term	Election	President
Diego de Aliaga	18 November 1823	10 February 1824	Election of the Congress of the Republic (according to the Constitution of 1823, which created a single vice presidency).	José Bernardo de Tagle
Manuel Salazar y Baquíjano (Note: Salazar was in charge of the Executive Branch from 9 June to 22 August 1827, while the elected president La Mar traveled from Guayaquil to Lima to assume command; and from 13 September 1828, to 7 June 1829, when La Mar assumed command of the Peruvian army after the outbreak of the War against Gran Colombia until the coup d'état promoted by General La Fuente in Lima.)	9 June 1827	7 June 1829	Direct elections	José de La Mar
Antonio Gutiérrez de la Fuente (Note: La Fuente assumed the interim presidency from 21 September to 25 November 1829, due to President Gamarra's trip to negotiate a peace agreement with Gran Colombia; and from 5 September 1830, to 16 April 1831, when Gamarra had to travel south due to unrest on the Bolivian border. He was forced to resign as vice president in the face of a coup led by Gamarra's wife, Francisca Zubiaga y Bernales, the famous "Mariscala.)	1 September 1829	16 April 1831	Election of the Congress of the Republic (according to the Constitution of 1828, which created a single vice presidency).	Agustín Gamarra
Juan Manuel del Mar (Note: Del Mar was in charge of the Executive Branch from 29 September 1859, to 22 March 1860, when President Castilla was absent to take personal command of the army during the Ecuador Campaign. He died days before completing his vice-presidential term, while in the midst of his presidential campaign.)	24 October 1858	16 June 1862	Direct elections (according to the Constitution of 1856, which established a single vice presidency).	Ramón Castilla

=== Dual vice presidents: 1860-1920 ===
Vice Presidents		Term of Office		Party	Election	President
Vice Presidents		Start of term	End of term	Party	Election	President
The Constitution of 1860 established two vice presidencies
1st	Juan Antonio Pezet	24 October 1862	5 August 1863	Military	Indirect elections (according to the Constitution of 1860, which established two vice presidencies).	Miguel de San Román
2nd	Pedro Diez Canseco Corbacho (Note: Pedro Diez Canseco assumed the interim presidency from 9 April to 5 August 1863, due to the death of San Román and the absence of Pezet; He then assumed the effective presidency, replacing the deceased president.)	24 October 1862	5 August 1863	Military	Indirect elections (according to the Constitution of 1860, which established two vice presidencies).	Miguel de San Román
Vice presidencies vacant from 1863 to 1868
1st	Mariano Herencia Zevallos	2 August 1868	27 July 1872	Military	Direct elections	José Balta
2nd	Francisco Diez Canseco (Note: Francisco Diez-Canseco assumed the interim presidency on 27 July 1872, following the assassination of Balta and the absence of Zevallos; he then assumed the Presidency of the Republic in place of the assassinated president.)	2 August 1868	27 July 1872	Military	Direct elections	José Balta
1st	Manuel Costas Arce (Note: Manuel Costas assumed the interim presidency from 28 November 1874, to 16 January 1875, due to the absence of President Pardo, who was campaigning against Piérola's revolution.)	2 August 1872	2 August 1876	Civil Party	Direct elections	Manuel Pardo y Lavalle
2nd	Francisco Garmendia Puértolas	2 August 1872	2 August 1876	Civil Party	Direct elections	Manuel Pardo y Lavalle
1st	Luis La Puerta (Note: After President Prado left for the south to lead the war with Chile, La Puerta assumed the interim presidency from 17 May to 28 November 1879; and then, due to a trip abroad, from 18 to 23 December, before being finally overthrown by Piérola.)	2 August 1876	18 December 1879	Civil Party	Indirect elections	Mariano Ignacio Prado
2nd	José Francisco Canevaro Valega	2 August 1876	18 December 1879		Indirect elections	Mariano Ignacio Prado
Vice presidencies vacant from 1879 to 1881
1st	Lizardo Montero (Note: Due to García-Calderón's arrest, Montero assumed the effective presidency.)	12 March 1881	6 November 1881	Military/Civilista Party	Election by the Extraordinary Congress of Chorrillos, at the request of President García Calderón.	Francisco García Calderón
2nd	Andrés Avelino Cáceres	12 March 1881	6 November 1881	Military	Election by the Extraordinary Congress of Chorrillos, at the request of President García Calderón.	Francisco García Calderón
Vice presidencies vacant from 1881 to 1886
1st	Remigio Morales Bermúdez	3 June 1886	10 August 1890	Constitutional Party	Indirect elections	Andrés Avelino Cáceres
2nd	Aurelio Denegri	3 June 1886	10 August 1890	Constitutional Party	Indirect elections	Andrés Avelino Cáceres
1st	Pedro Alejandrino del Solar	10 August 1890	1 April 1894	Constitutional Party	Indirect elections	Remigio Morales Bermúdez
2nd	Justiniano Borgoño (Note: Following the death of Morales Bermúdez on April 1, 1894, Borgoño assumed the Presidency of the Republic, despite the fact that the latter's position was legally vested in him, as First Vice President. The latter's alleged excuse was alleged.)	10 August 1890	1 April 1894	Constitutional Party	Indirect elections	Remigio Morales Bermúdez
1st	César Canevaro	10 August 1894	20 March 1895	Constitutional Party	Indirect elections	Andrés Avelino Cáceres
2nd	Cesáreo Chacaltana Reyes	10 August 1894	20 March 1895	Constitutional Party	Indirect elections	Andrés Avelino Cáceres
1st	Guillermo Billinghurst	8 September 1895	8 September 1899	Democratic Party	Indirect elections	Nicolás de Piérola
2nd	Augusto Seminario y Váscones	8 September 1895	8 September 1899	Democratic Party	Indirect elections	Nicolás de Piérola
1st	Isaac Alzamora	8 September 1899	8 September 1903	Civil-Democratic Alliance	Direct elections	Eduardo López de Romaña
2nd	Federico Bresani	8 September 1899	8 September 1903	Civil-Democratic Alliance	Direct elections	Eduardo López de Romaña
1st	Lino Alarco Brediñana (Note: Lino Alarco died before being sworn in as vice president, on 13 June 1903. Although the possibility of electing a new first vice president was discussed in Congress, it did not materialize.)	Died before assuming office		Civilista Party	Direct elections	Manuel Candamo
2nd	Serapio Calderón (Note: Following the death of Candamo, Serapio Calderón assumed the Presidency of the Republic on 7 May 1904.)	8 September 1903	7 May 1904	Civilista Party	Direct elections	Manuel Candamo
1st	José Salvador Cavero Ovalle	24 September 1904	24 September 1908	Civilista Party	Direct election. The 2nd Vice President was not elected.	José Pardo y Barreda
1st	Eugenio Larrabure y Unanue	24 September 1908	24 September 1912	Civilista Party	Direct elections	Augusto Leguía
2nd	Belisario Sosa	24 September 1908	24 September 1912	Constitutional Party	Direct elections	Augusto Leguía
1st	Roberto Leguía	24 September 1912	4 February 1914	Civilista Party (Leguiista)	Election by the Congress of the Republic.	Guillermo Billinghurst
2nd	Miguel Echenique	24 September 1912	4 February 1914	Civilista Party (Leguiista)	Election by the Congress of the Republic.	Guillermo Billinghurst
1st	Ricardo Bentín Sánchez	18 August 1915	4 July 1919	Civil-Constitutional-Liberal Alliance	Direct elections.	José Pardo y Barreda
2nd	Melitón Carvajal	18 August 1915	4 July 1919	Military	Direct elections.	José Pardo y Barreda
1st	César Canevaro	12 October 1919	31 October 1922	Constitutional Party	Direct elections, ratified by Congress.	Augusto Leguía
2nd	Agustín de la Torre González (Note: Both did not serve because the Constitution of 1920 abolished the office of vice president, which would be reinstated in 1936.)	12 October 1919	12 October 1924		Direct elections, ratified by Congress.	Augusto Leguía
Abolition of the Vice presidencies (1920–1936)

=== Dual vice presidents: 1936 onwards ===
Vice Presidents		Term of Office		Party	Election	President
Vice Presidents		Start of term	End of term	Party	Election	President
1st	Ernesto Montagne Markholz (Note: Montagne was appointed First Vice President as President of the Council of Ministers in the Benavides government.)	13 April 1936	8 December 1939	Military	Elected by President Benavides, with the approval of the Constitutional Congress.	Óscar Benavides
2nd	Antonio Rodríguez Ramírez (Note: Antonio Rodríguez was appointed 2nd Vice President as Minister of Government in the Benavides administration. While serving in this capacity, he was shot dead while attempting a coup d'état on February 19, 1939.)	13 April 1936	8 December 1939	Military	Elected by President Benavides, with the approval of the Constitutional Congress.	Óscar Benavides
1st	Rafael Larco Herrera	8 December 1939	28 July 1945	Conservative Coalition	1939 general election	Manuel Prado Ugarteche
2nd	Carlos D. Gibson (Note: Both of them never had the opportunity to take over the government on an interim basis, nor in the absence of the president, as it was established that the president always exercised his office, even when he was out of the country.)	8 December 1939	28 July 1945	Conservative Coalition	1939 general election	Manuel Prado Ugarteche
1st	José Gálvez Barrenechea	28 July 1945	29 October 1948	National Democratic Front	1945 general election	José Luis Bustamante y Rivero
2nd	Eduardo Ganoza y Ganoza	28 July 1945	29 October 1948	National Democratic Front	1945 general election	José Luis Bustamante y Rivero
1st	Zenón Noriega (Note: Zenón Noriega assumed the interim presidency of the Military Junta from June 1 to July 28, 1950, after Odría's "descent to the plains" on the occasion of the 1950 general elections.)	29 October 1948	1 June 1950	Military	Invested "de facto" after President Odría's coup d'état, as second in command of the Military Junta.	Manuel Odría
1st	Héctor Boza	28 July 1950	28 July 1956	Odriista National Union	1950 general election	Manuel Odría
2nd	Federico Bolognesi Bolognesi (Note: Both of them never had the opportunity to take over the government on an interim basis, nor in the absence of the president.)	28 July 1950	28 July 1956	Odriista National Union	1950 general election	Manuel Odría
1st	Luis Gallo Porras (Note: Luis Gallo Porras assumed the interim government for several short periods, due to President Prado's absence abroad.)	28 July 1956	18 July 1962	Peruvian Democratic Movement	1956 general election	Manuel Prado Ugarteche
2nd	Carlos Moreyra and Paz Soldán	28 July 1956	18 July 1962	Peruvian Democratic Movement	1956 general election	Manuel Prado Ugarteche
1st	Nicolás Lindley López	18 July 1962	3 March 1963	Military	Invested de facto in his capacity as a member of the Military Junta.	Ricardo Pérez Godoy
1st	Pedro Vargas Prada	3 March 1963	28 July 1963	Military	Invested de facto in his capacity as a member of the Military Junta.	Nicolás Lindley López
1st	Edgardo Seoane Corrales (Note: Edgardo Seoane assumed the interim government in April 1967, due to Belaúnde's attendance at the Conference of American Presidents in Punta del Este, Uruguay.)	28 July 1963	3 October 1968	Popular Action	1963 general election	Fernando Belaúnde Terry
2nd	Mario Polar Ugarteche	28 July 1963	3 October 1968	Christian Democratic Party	1963 general election	Fernando Belaúnde Terry
1st	Edgardo Mercado Jarrín	3 October 1968	30 August 1975	Military	Invested de facto as Prime Minister and Minister of War of the Military Government.	Juan Velasco Alvarado
1st	Pedro Richter Prada	30 August 1975	28 July 1980	Military	Invested de facto in his capacity as a member of the military junta.	Francisco Morales Bermúdez
1st	Fernando Schwalb	28 July 1980	28 July 1985	Popular Action	1980 general election	Fernando Belaúnde Terry
2nd	Javier Alva Orlandini	28 July 1980	28 July 1985	Popular Action	1980 general election	Fernando Belaúnde Terry
1st	Luis Alberto Sánchez	28 July 1985	28 July 1990	Peruvian Aprista Party	1985 general election	Alan García
2nd	Luis Alva Castro	28 July 1985	28 July 1990	Peruvian Aprista Party	1985 general election	Alan García
1st	Máximo San Román (Note: The vice-presidential posts were suspended after the 1992 Peruvian self-coup. First vice president Máximo San Román led a constitutionalist movement that ignored Fujimori's authority and even went so far as to take the oath of office as President of the Republic before the senators and deputies of the dissolved Congress of the Republic, at the Lima Bar Association. However, his act lacked the support of the public, and Fujimori consolidated his hold on power.)	28 July 1990	5 April 1992	Cambio 90	1990 general election	Alberto Fujimori
2nd	Carlos García y García	28 July 1990	5 April 1992	Cambio 90	1990 general election	Alberto Fujimori
Vice presidencies vacant from 1992 to 1993
—	Jaime Yoshiyama (Note: Because San Román and García y García did not recognize Fujimori as President, the Democratic Constituent Congress approved a Constitutional Law establishing that in the event of the temporary or permanent absence or impediment of the President of the Republic, the President of the Democratic Constituent Congress immediately assumes his duties.)	12 January 1993	28 July 1995	Cambio 90	Appointed by the Constitutional Law of January 1993.	Alberto Fujimori
1st	Ricardo Márquez Flores	28 July 1995	28 July 2000	Cambio 90	1995 general election	Alberto Fujimori
2nd	César Paredes Canto	28 July 1995	28 July 2000	New Majority	1995 general election	Alberto Fujimori
1st	Francisco Tudela	28 July 2000	22 November 2000 (Note: Tudela and Márquez were forced to resign before the Congress of the Republic after learning of the flight to Japan of re-elected President Alberto Fujimori and the debate over the presidential vacancy.)	Perú 2000	2000 general election	Alberto Fujimori
2nd	Ricardo Márquez Flores	28 July 2000	22 November 2000	Perú 2000	2000 general election	Alberto Fujimori
1st	Raúl Diez Canseco	28 July 2001	14 December 2004 (Note: Raúl Diez Canseco irrevocably resigned from his position on 30 January 2004, after considering himself the victim of two "politicized" constitutional accusations.)	Perú Possible	2001 general election	Alejandro Toledo
2nd	David Waisman	28 July 2001	28 July 2006	Perú Possible	2001 general election	Alejandro Toledo
1st	Luis Giampietri	28 July 2006	28 July 2011	Peruvian Aprista Party	2006 general election	Alan García
2nd	Lourdes Mendoza del Solar	28 July 2006	28 July 2011	Peruvian Aprista Party	2006 general election	Alan García
1st	Marisol Espinoza	28 July 2011	28 July 2016	Peruvian Nationalist Party	2011 general election	Ollanta Humala
2nd	Omar Chehade	28 July 2011	31 January 2012 (Note: Omar Chehade resigned from his position on 16 January 2012, following a series of scandals sparked by his meetings with members of the police force to take shares in a private company in October 2011.)	Peruvian Nationalist Party	2011 general election	Ollanta Humala
1st	Martín Vizcarra	28 July 2016	23 March 2018	Peruvians for Change	2016 general election	Pedro Pablo Kuczynski
2nd	Mercedes Aráoz	28 July 2016	7 May 2020 (Note: Mercedes Aráoz submitted her resignation on 1 October 2019.)	Peruvians for Change (2018–2020); Independent (2018–2020)	2016 general election	Pedro Pablo Kuczynski
2nd	Mercedes Aráoz	28 July 2016	7 May 2020	Peruvians for Change (2018–2020); Independent (2018–2020)	2016 general election	Martín Vizcarra
1st	Dina Boluarte	28 July 2021	7 December 2022	Free Peru (2021–2022); Independent (Jan–Dec 2022)	2021 general election	Pedro Castillo
2nd	Vladimir Cerrón	Did not take office (Note: The second vice presidency was to be occupied by Vladimir Cerrón, however, he was disqualified by the National Jury of Elections in the middle of the election campaign for serving a prison sentence since 2019.)		Free Peru	2021 general election	Pedro Castillo
Vice presidencies vacant from 2022 to 2026
1st	Luis Galarreta	28 July 2026	Incumbent	Popular Force	2026 general election	Keiko Fujimori
2nd	Miki Torres	28 July 2026	Incumbent	Popular Force	2026 general election	Keiko Fujimori

== See also ==
- List of current vice presidents

== Notes and references ==
Notes
