= Mauricio Villeda =

Honduran politician and attorney

- Born: Mauricio Villeda Bermúdez; 27 April 1948 (age 78); Tegucigalpa, Honduras
- Education: Universidad Nacional Autónoma de Honduras
- Political party: Partido Liberal de Honduras
- Spouse: Gracia del Carmen Zuñiga
- Children: 3
- Parent(s): Ramón Villeda Morales; Alejandrina Bermúdez Milla

Mauricio Villeda Bermúdez (born April 27, 1948) is a Honduran attorney, leader of the Liberal Party of Honduras, and son of the late former president Ramón Villeda Morales. He ran unsuccessfully as a presidential candidate in the 2013 presidential elections.

== Early life ==
Mauricio Villeda Bermúdez was born in the city of Tegucigalpa and is the fourth of six children of the former Honduran president, Ramón Villeda Morales and his wife, Doña Alejandrina Bermúdez Milla de Villeda Morales. His father served as president between 1957 and 1963. His government was characterized by having promoted countless social reforms such as the Agrarian Reform Law, the Labor Code, the Social Security Law, the National Social Welfare Board and countless physical works, which prevented Honduras from falling into the turbulent social situation that took place in the rest of the countries of the region.

President Villeda Morales was overthrown in 1963 by a violent military coup led by General Oswaldo López Arellano, two months before the end of his presidential term and ten days before the presidential elections, due to the prevailing political instability, a product of his lack of leadership in presidential administration. Mauricio accompanied his father into exile in Costa Rica, the country where they lived for almost two years.

== Education ==
He completed his secondary studies in Tegucigalpa, graduated as a Bachelor of Science and Letters from the San Francisco Institute. He studied higher studies at the National Autonomous University of Honduras where he obtained the degree of Bachelor of Legal and Social Sciences; later, the title of Lawyer at the same university. Obtaining a Master's Degree in Bioethics from the University of the Isthmus of Guatemala. He has been a member of the Honduran Bar Association since 1975, where he has been a member of the Commercial Law Commission and the Human Rights Commission on various occasions.

== Politics ==
The Liberal Party chose Villeda as their presidential candidate for the general elections of 2013. He was elected president of the Central Executive Council of the Liberal Party for the period 2014-2017. Mauricio Villeda Bermúdez was elected Deputy Owner of the National Congress of Honduras by the Department of Francisco Morazán, for the periods 2018–2022 and 2022–2026. He is a member of the right-wing and far-right political alliance, the Madrid Forum, which was organized by the Spanish political party Vox.
