= Ricardo Márquez (politician) =

Peruvian businessman and politician

Ricardo Marquez
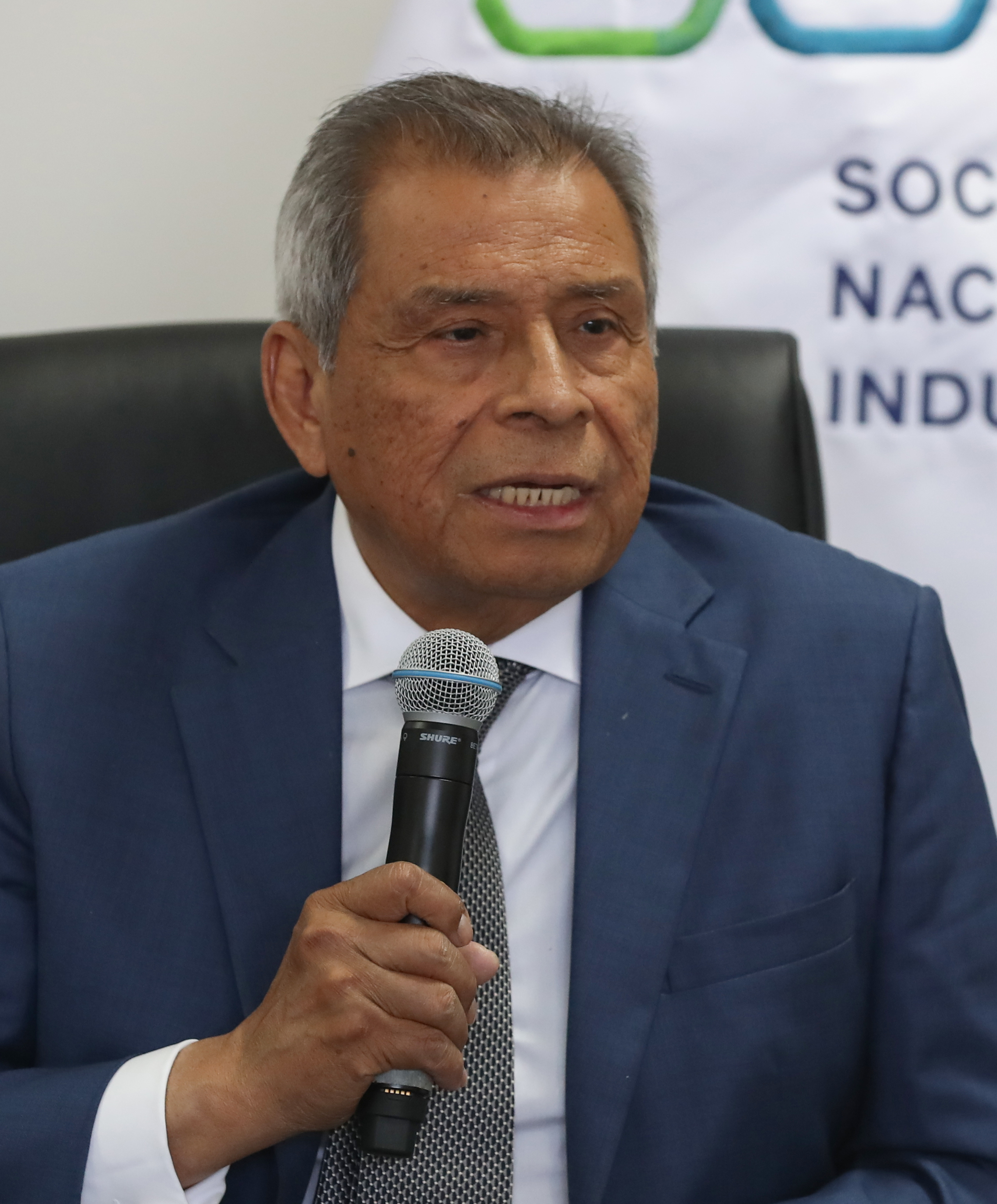

Second Vice President of Peru
- In office 28 July 2000 – 21 November 2000
- President: Alberto Fujimori
- Preceded by: César Paredes Canto
- Succeeded by: David Waisman (2001)

First Vice President of Peru
- In office 28 July 1995 – 28 July 2000
- President: Alberto Fujimori
- Preceded by: Máximo San Román (1992)
- Succeeded by: Francisco Tudela

Personal details
- Born: Ricardo Marquez Flores; 16 June 1943 (age 83) Lima, Peru
- Party: Cambio 90 – New Majority; Peru 2000
- Education: New York University
- Profession: Politician, businessman

Ricardo Marquez Flores (born 16 June 1943) is a Peruvian businessman and former Fujimorist politician. He was First Vice President of Peru during the second term of Alberto Fujimori between 28 July 1995 and 28 July 2000, and later served as Second Vice President of Peru during Fujimori's brief third term from 28 July 2000, until the resignation of Fujimori on 21 November 2000. He served as the president of the National Society of Industries (SNI) on two occasions, from 1993 to 1994 and from 2018 to 2022.

== Early life and career ==
He was born to María Esther Flores Lozano de Marquez. He studied at the Leoncio Prado Military College in the La Perla-Callao district, and later studied Industrial Engineering at New York University.

He was Vice President of the National Confederation of Private Business Institutions (CONFIEP). From 1993 to 1994, he served as the president of the National Society of Industries.

== Political career ==
=== First Vice President (1995–2000) ===
In the 1995 general election, he ran for First Vice President, in the presidential ticket of then-president Alberto Fujimori, who triumphed in his first re-election. Márquez was commissioned to launch a five-year export promotion plan, the goal of which was to turn Peru into a vigorous export economy.

In April 1996, the government created the Export Promotion Commission (Prompex), which was chaired by Márquez.

He was President of the Center for the Promotion of Small and Micro-enterprises (PROMPYME).

=== Second Vice President (July–November 2000) ===
In the 2000 general elections, he switched to the second vice presidency, in the Peru 2000 ticket headed by Fujimori, who again triumphed in his second re-election for a third term, amid discontent among a large part of the population.

When Fujimori resigned, Márquez was next in line for the presidency, since first vice president Francisco Tudela had himself resigned as few days earlier after breaking with Fujimori. However, Congress refused to recognize him as the new president because he was still an ardent Fujimori ally. When it became clear that Márquez would not be allowed to claim the presidency, he submitted his resignation, which was accepted by the Congress on 22 November 2000.

=== Post-vice presidency ===
Márquez did not return to participate in politics and rather focused on forming a business career instead. In 2018, Marquez Flores again assumed the presidency of the National Society of Industries until 2022.
