= César Paredes Canto =

Peruvian academic and politician

Second Vice President of Peru
- In office July 28, 1995 – July 28, 2000
- President: Alberto Fujimori
- Preceded by: Carlos García y García (1992)
- Succeeded by: Ricardo Márquez Flores

Personal details
- Born: César Alipio Paredes Canto; 22 November 1941 Cajamarca, Peru
- Died: 7 May 2018 (aged 76) Cajamarca, Peru
- Party: Cambio 90 – New Majority
- Profession: Academic

César Alipio Paredes Canto (22 November 1941 – 7 May 2018) was a Peruvian academic and Fujimorist politician who served as Second Vice President of Peru between 1995 and 2000 during the second term of Alberto Fujimori.

== Early life and career ==
Parades was born in Cajamarca on 22 November 1941. He was rector of the National University of Cajamarca and served the National Assembly of Rectors as president between 1992 and 1999. Paredes was a member of the Fujimorist Cambio 90 – New Majority alliance and was elected as the Second Vice President of Peru in the 1995 elections and was Second Vice President during the second term of President Alberto Fujimori from 1995 to 2000. After serving for one term as Second Vice President, Paredes Canto didn't run for re-election as Second Vice President. In the 2001 elections, he ran for Congress for a seat under the People's Solution coalition, but was not elected and retired from politics. He died on 7 May 2018 of a heart attack.

Political offices
Preceded by Carlos García y García	Second Vice President of Peru; July 1995 – July 2000	Succeeded by Ricardo Márquez Flores
