= Diego de Aliaga =

Peruvian politician (1784–1825)

Diego de Aliaga OSP

1st Vice President of Peru
- In office November 18, 1823 – February 10, 1824
- Appointed by: Peruvian Congress
- President: José Bernardo de Tagle y Portocarrero, Marquis of Torre Tagle
- Preceded by: Office established
- Succeeded by: Vacant (Manuel Salazar y Baquíjano elected in 1827)

Personal details
- Born: September 9, 1784 Lima, Viceroyalty of Peru
- Died: November 4, 1825 (aged 41) Callao, Peru
- Cause of death: Scurvy
- Spouse: Clara Buendía y Carrillo
- Parent(s): Sebastián de Aliaga; María Santa Cruz
- Occupation: Statesman

Diego de Aliaga Sotomayor y Santa Cruz (September 9, 1784 – November 4, 1825) was a Peruvian politician and aristocrat who served as the first Vice President of Peru, from 1823 to 1824, under the presidency of José Bernardo de Tagle y Portocarrero, Marquis of Torre Tagle, appointed by the Peruvian Congress.

== Early life ==
Aliaga was born on September 9, 1784, in Lima, Peru the son of Sebastian de Aliaga y Colmenares, 6th Marquis of Zelada de la Fuente, and Mercedes de Santa Cruz y Querejazu, 4th Countess of San Juan de Lurigancho. The de Aliaga family was one of the most ancient Spanish families established in Peru as its members were direct descendants of Conquistador Jerónimo de Aliaga.

He began his career as a lieutenant of the regiment of the nobility. In 1810, Viceroy Fernando de Abascal promoted him to Captain of the Guard of Halberdiers and Archers of the Palace of the Viceroy, a post he also occupied under Joaquín de la Pezuela until 1816.

He married the controversial Clara de Buendía y Carrillo de Albornoz, daughter and heiress to the Marquis of Castellón. Buendía was known for being processed by the Inquisition in 1819 and for being remarried twice under suspicious circumstances.

== Politics ==
At the same time, de Aliaga involved himself in commerce and communicated with conspirators who wanted to overthrow the Spanish monarchy from Peru. Gradually his interest for independence began to wane. But when José de San Martín declared Peru an independent state, he became active in the newly independent Peru. He became vice-president of the republic in 1823.

When Royalist forces invaded Peru, he and the president left their jobs and handed dictatorial power to Simon Bolivar. But then he and the president reached a backroom deal with the royalists, who failed to re-capture Peru.

== Death ==
Fearing reprisals of Simon Bolivar, he and the president took refuge in the Real Felipe Fortress, Callao, where he died in 1825. After his death, he was exonerated of treason charges but his assets were taken away.

== Bibliography ==
- Basadre, Jorge: Historia de la República del Perú. 1822 - 1933, vol. 1 (8th edition, corrected and expanded). Edited for the Diario "La República" of Lima and the Universidad "Ricardo Palma". Santiago de Chile, 1998
- Mendiburu, Manuel de: Diccionario histórico-biográfico del Perú. Parte primera que corresponde a la época de la dominación española, vol. I. Lima, 1875
- Tauro del Pino, Alberto: Enciclopedia Ilustrada del Perú, 3rd edition, vol 1: AAA-ANG. Lima, PEISA, 2001. ISBN 9972401502
