= 1876 Peruvian presidential election =

- 7 May 1876
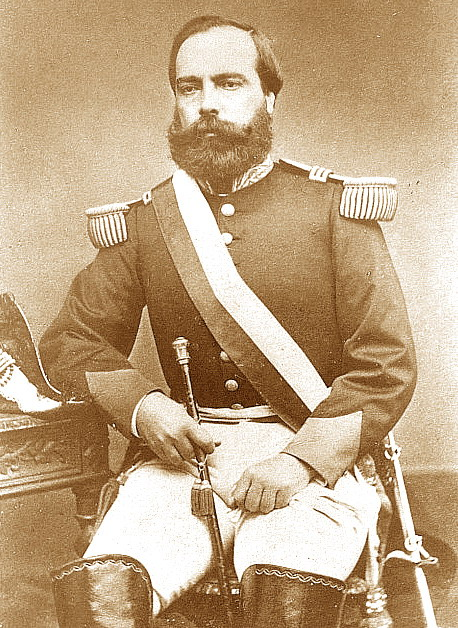

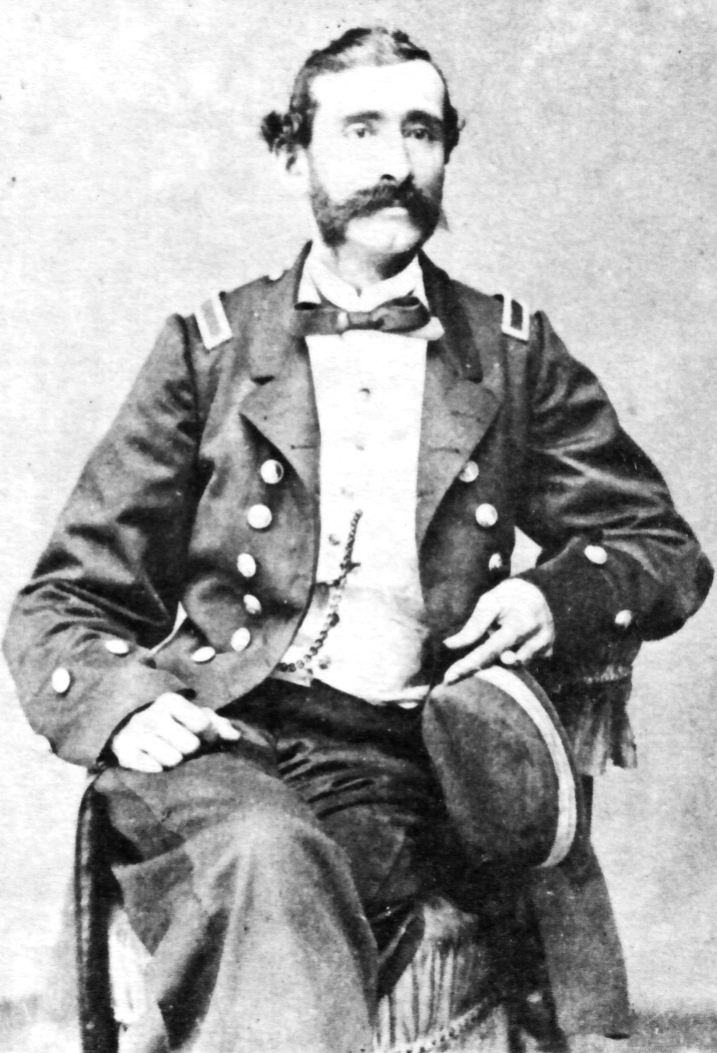
Candidate	Mariano Ignacio Prado	Lizardo Montero Flores
Party	Civilista Party	Independent
Electoral vote	3,418	136
Percentage	96.17%	3.83%
President before election
Manuel Pardo
Civilista Party
Elected President
Mariano Ignacio Prado
Civilista Party

Presidential elections were held in Peru on 7 May 1876. Mariano Ignacio Prado of the Civilista Party was elected with 96% of the vote.

== Background ==
Former army general and president Mariano Ignacio Prado, who had served as Secretary of Finance under outgoing president Manuel Pardo, started his election campaign in May 1875.

The ruling Civilista Party initially nominated José Simeón Tejeda as its presidential candidate. However, Tejeda died shortly before the election campaign was due to begin. The party subsequently adopted Prado as its candidate in January 1876.

Prado was opposed by another military figure, Lizardo Montero Flores, who ran as an independent candidate.

== Electoral system ==
The elections were indirect, with the president elected by the same electoral college elected in October 1875 that elected the Congress.

== Conduct ==
The elections were marked by violence.

== Results ==
Candidate	Party	Votes	%
Mariano Ignacio Prado	Civilista Party	3,418	96.17
Lizardo Montero Flores	Independent	136	3.83
Total		3,554	100.00
Total votes		3,606	–
Registered voters/turnout		5,376	67.08
Source: ONPE, Witt

== Aftermath ==
Prado survived a coup attempt in May 1877 but was removed from office by a successful coup in December 1879, when he was replaced by Nicolás de Piérola.
