= Vanya Thais =

Peruvian political commentator and journalist

- Born: December 4, 1994 (age 31); Lima, Peru
- Education: University of San Martín de Porres

{{subst:cdb}}

Vanya Melissa Thais Iriarte is a Peruvian political commentator and journalist. She gained prominence in Peruvian media for her strong opposition to Pedro Castillo during the 2021 Peruvian general election and her frequent controversial statements in the press.

== Career ==
Thais graduated with a degree in journalism from the University of San Martín de Porres. Following her graduation from University of San Martín de Porres, Thais gained prominence after being the main speaker of the protest against communism in 2021 and interviewed in the New York Times.

Following the election of Pedro Castillo in the 2021 Peruvian general election, Thais defended the possible need for a coup d'état to oust Castillo from office, sharing these thoughts with Alejandro Cavero of the conservative Go on Country according to Ojo Público. In anti-Castillo demonstrations organized by Fujimorists, Thais was presented on the main stage to speak beside Keiko Fujimori, the daughter of the former president of Peru, Alberto Fujimori, who lost to Castillo in the 2021 presidential elections.

Thais travelled to Spain in October 2021 to participate in what La Jornada described as an "indoctrination program" hosted by the Disenso Foundation of the conservative Spanish party Vox. Thais would also sign the Madrid Charter, a document drafted by Vox that describes left-wing groups as enemies of Ibero-America involved in a "criminal project" that are "under the umbrella of the Cuban regime".

== Political views ==
Peruvian media have variably described Thais as having right-wing views and being a Fujimorist, though Thais has constantly described them as cowards and claims only Alberto Fuimori was respectable. According to OjoPúblico, Thais has been known to "promote virulent speeches and disinformation on social networks", with the website writing that she described rights for both minorities and LGBT individuals as "stupid". She says this is nor only false but necessary and claims people is not ready to live "in the truth" Diario Correo described Thais as anti-feminist after she stated "Feminism gives me nausea and it will always give me nausea, ... I believe in the Christian submission of the woman to her husband". She has also defended Alberto Fujimori for his use of Grupo Colina, a death squad that he controlled. Thais has also shared support for President of Brazil Jair Bolsonaro on social media, Viktor Orban, Jose Maria Aznar and Giorgia Melone, though she doesn't approve president Javier Milei.

== Personal life ==
On her social media, Thais refers to herself as "blue mom", sharing that her first son is autistic. She also shares the recipes of the gluten-free food she gives her son to control autism.
