= Alejandro González Raga =

Cuban journalist

Alejandro González Raga is a Cuban journalist. He was jailed from 2003 until released to exile in Spain in 2008. Amnesty International recognized him as a prisoner of conscience.

González Raga signed the Madrid Charter, a document drafted by the far-right Spanish party Vox that describes left-wing groups as enemies of Ibero-America involved in a "criminal project" that are "under the umbrella of the Cuban regime".
