= Carlos García y García =

Peruvian politician and pastor

Interim President of Peru Partial recognition (Note: Interim Presidency de jure partially recognized during the 1992 Peruvian self-coup. García y García was sworn into the interim presidency as Second Vice President, since the first in the line of succession, First Vice President Máximo San Román was in another country during the succession. Due to the lack of military support, he never assumed the interim presidential powers. Alberto Fujimori, who led the self-coup, continued his presidential powers as the President of the Emergency and National Reconstruction Government.)
- In office 5 April 1992 – 20 April 1992; Disputed with Alberto Fujimori
- Vice President: First Vice President; Vacant; Second Vice President; Vacant
- Preceded by: Alberto Fujimori
- Succeeded by: Máximo San Román (Note: Máximo San Román was not in the country at the time of the self-coup on 5 April 1992, nor was he informed about it. García y García was sworn into the interim presidency during San Román’s absence. San Román was sworn into the interim presidency when he had returned to the country.)

Second Vice President of Peru
- In office 28 July 1990 – 5 April 1992
- President: Alberto Fujimori
- Preceded by: Luis Alva Castro
- Succeeded by: César Paredes Canto (Note: Vice presidency was vacated until a new vice president was elected in the 1995 Peruvian general election.)

Member of the Chamber of Deputies
- In office 28 July 1956 – 18 July 1962
- Constituency: Piura

Personal details
- Born: 19 November 1927 Peru
- Died: 10 May 2016 (aged 88) Lima, Peru
- Party: Cambio 90
- Profession: Baptist pastor

Carlos García y García (Spanish pronunciation: [ˈkaɾloz ɣaɾˈsia i ɣaɾˈsia]; 19 November 1927 – 10 May 2016) was a Peruvian former Fujimorist politician and Baptist pastor.

== Political career ==
He served as the Second Vice President of Peru from July 28, 1990, to April 5, 1992, during the presidency of Alberto Fujimori. Though García y García was a member of Fujimori's Cambio 90, he publicly condemned Fujimori's coup and constitutional crisis, which took place on 5 April 1992.

García y García, a Baptist minister, also served as the president of the National Evangelical Council (Concilio Nacional Evangélico). In July 2002, García y García was awarded the Medalla de Honor del Congreso (Grand Officer) for his defense of democracy and the Constitution during the 1992 Peruvian constitutional crisis.

== Death ==
Carlos García y García died on 10 May 2016 at the age of 88. His wake and viewing was held at a church in the Lince District of Lima on 12 May 2016.

== Notes ==
Political offices
Preceded by Luis Alva Castro	Second Vice President of Peru; July 1990 – April 1992	Succeeded by César Paredes Canto
