= Juan Carlos Lizarzaburu =

Peruvian politician (born 1969)

Member of the Congress of the Republic of Peru
- In office July 27, 2021 – July 26, 2026
- Constituency: Peruanos en el extranjero

Personal details
- Born: Juan Carlos Martín Lizarzaburu Lizarzaburu; June 20, 1969 (age 57) Lima, Peru
- Other political affiliations: Alianza para el Progreso
- Education: University of Lima
- Occupation: Bachelor in Social Sciences

Juan Carlos Martín Lizarzaburu Lizarzaburu (born 20 June 1969) is a Peruvian politician. He was elected congressman of the Republic of Peru for overseas citizens for the 2021–2026 parliamentary period representing Popular Force. He is one of two politicians to represent the electoral district.

According to information recorded in his parliamentary résumé, Lizarzaburu holds both Peruvian and Spanish nationality, a status declared before the Congress of the Republic of Peru. He also completed higher education studies related to accounting, auditing, marketing, and telecommunications, as stated in his parliamentary records.

== Political career ==
In the general elections of 2021, Lizarzaburu was elected to the Peruvian Congress for overseas citizens with Popular Force. He garnered 1,773 votes for the parliamentary period 2021–2026.

Lizarzaburu is based in Spain.

The legislative work carried out by his parliamentary office is recorded in the legislative tracking system of the Congress of the Republic, which details the laws approved and enacted during his congressional tenure. Likewise, the bills introduced by his parliamentary office are individually detailed on the official portal of the Congress of the Republic of Peru, where the legislative initiatives promoted during his parliamentary duties are documented.
