= José Bernardo de Tagle y Portocarrero, 4th Marquess of Torre Tagle =

President of Peru from 1823 to 1824

The Marquess of Torre Tagle
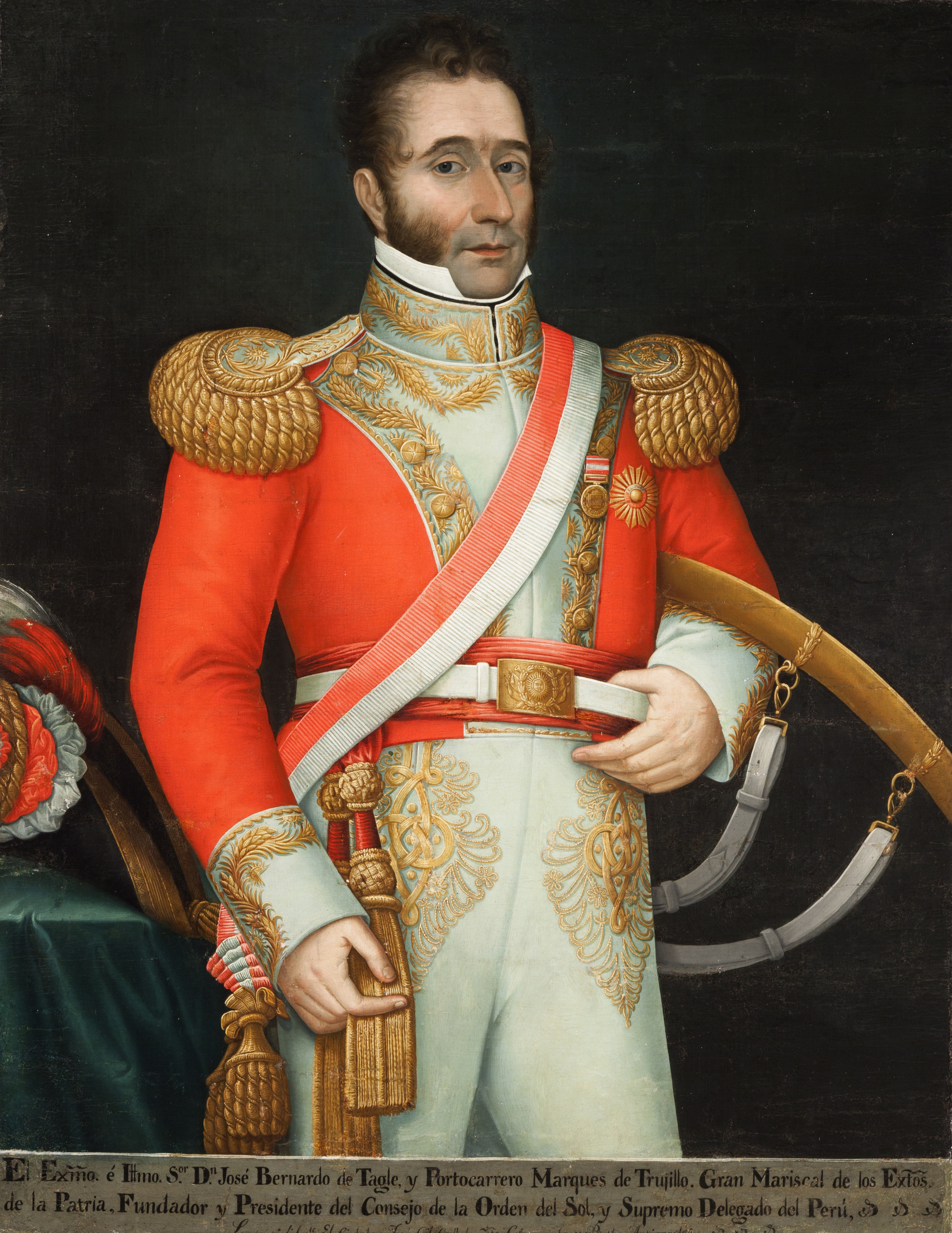
- Portrait by José Gil de Castro, 1823

2nd President of Peru
- In office 17 July 1823 – 17 February 1824
- Vice President: Diego de Aliaga
- Preceded by: Antonio José de Sucre; Francisco Valdivieso y Prada
- Succeeded by: Simón Bolívar

Personal details
- Born: 21 March 1779 Lima, Viceroyalty of Peru, Spanish Empire
- Died: 26 September 1825 (aged 46) El Callao, Peru
- Profession: Soldier

José Bernardo de Tagle y Portocarrero, 4th Marquess of Torre Tagle (21 March 1779 – 26 September 1825), was a Peruvian soldier and politician who served as the Interim President of Peru in 1823 as well as the second President of Peru from 1823 to 1824. He was a supporter of liberalism.

== Biography ==
He was born on 21 March 1779, in Lima, Colonial Peru, into an aristocratic family. His father was José Manuel de Tagle e Isásaga, lieutenant colonel of the Regiment of Dragoons of Lima and heir of the Marquessate of Torre Tagle. His mother was Josefa Portocarrero y Zamudio, a granddaughter of the Count of Monclova and a great-granddaughter of Melchor Portocarrero, Viceroy of Peru. When his grandfather died in 1794, his father succeeded him as the 3rd Marquis of Torre Tagle.

Tagle received a private education. He initiated his military career as cadet of the Regiment of Dragoons of Lima in 1789 when he was just ten years old. In 1800, he married Juana García de la Plata, daughter of an oidor of the Real Audiencia of Lima. The following year, he succeeded his father as Marquis of Torre Tagle (although he only received a provisional confirmation by the king in 1810) and inherited the post of Commissar of War and Navy of the important Fortress of Callao.

His wife, with whom he had no children, died in 1811. Also in 1811, Viceroy Abascal promoted him to sergeant-major. The following year, Tagle was successively appointed lieutenant colonel and colonel of the newly created Regiment of Distinguished Volunteers of the Spanish Concord, a unit which he initially largely funded personally.

In 1819, Marquis remarried to Mariana Echevarría y Santiago de Ulloa.

== Political career ==
In addition to his military promotion, he entered local politics by winning the election for Mayor of Lima for the 1811–12 term. During this time, Tagle entered into contact with some of the liberal nobles of Lima who advocated for reforms and then became conspirators against the viceregal administration like José de la Riva Agüero or the Count de la Vega del Ren. As a consequence, Viceroy Abascal managed his election as Deputy for Lima to the Cortes of Cadiz in March 1813 and Tagle was sent to Spain.

In Cadiz, he ardently defended the independence of America. During this time, Tagle sent a petition to the King requiring his appointment as Intendant of Tarma or Trujillo, but he only obtained a similar post to La Paz, which is why he remained in Spain for some years. In 1815, he was created a Knight of the Order of Santiago and promoted to the rank of brigadier in the army.

On his return to Peru in 1819, Viceroy La Pezuela prevented him from exercising his position as Intendant of La Paz. In return, the viceroy first appointed him his aide-de-camp and then interim Intendant of Lima.

In 1820, he was appointed Intendant of Trujillo and when José de San Martín entered into Peru, he was the first Peruvian officer to hoist the national flag in the north of Peru, and on 24 December 1820, proclaimed Trujillo independent.

After the independence was proclaimed by San Martín in July 1821, Tagle was appointed General Inspector of the Civic Guard and Commander-in-Chief of the Peruvian Legion. One of the closest allies of San Martín, he was designated a member of the Council of State and created a Founder of the Order of the Sun, of whose Grand Council he was vice president.

On 26 July 1822, he was appointed provisional president by San Martin when the latter went to meet Simón Bolívar in Guayaquil. After the departure of San Martin for Chile, on 20 September, Torre Tagle was elected member of the triumvirate under José de La Mar. In January 1823, the congress appointed him president, but a military mutiny deposed him and proclaimed José de la Riva Agüero president on 28 February. After the deposition of Riva Agüero and his retreat to Trujillo, Torre Tagle was appointed president by Antonio José de Sucre on 20 July, and elected by the congress on 16 August, and Bolivar, who on his arrival 1 September had been proclaimed dictator, left him in charge of the government.

During his tenure, the Peruvian flag, which had been established by José de San Martín, was changed due to its complex elaboration. The new flag model proposed by Torre Tagle was composed of a vertical triband with red outer bands and a single white middle band with a sun in the center.

When the garrison of Callao revolted 5 February 1824, for arrears of pay, Torre Tagle failed to provide the necessary means to remunerate them, and the garrison declared loyalty to Spain. Bolívar sent General Mariano Necochea to arrest Torre Tagle, and the congress deposed him on 10 February. Fearing to be shot by order of a court martial, Torre Tagle fled to Callao, where the rebels kept him a prisoner, and on the reoccupation of Lima by the Spaniards, he was offered the place as governor of the capital, but declined, preferring to remain a prisoner of war.

After the beginning of the second siege of Callao, he tried several times to be admitted on board the blockading Chilean fleet, but Admiral Manuel Blanco Encalada refused to receive him except as a prisoner, and he perished with his whole family by the disease that was caused by the famine due to the protracted siege. Although he was not a traitor to his country, as charged by his enemies, he caused great misfortunes by his want of energy and vacillating policy.

Preceded by José de La Mar	Interim President of Peru; 1823	Succeeded by José de la Riva Agüero
Preceded by Antonio José de Sucre; Francisco Valdivieso y Prada	President of Peru "Supreme Delegate"; 1823–1824	Succeeded by Simón Bolívar
