= Francisco Garmendia Puértolas =

Peruvian politician

Francisco Garmendia Puértolas (29 January 1821 – 13 February 1873) was the Vice President of Peru from 1872 to his death in 1873.

== Early life ==
Garmendia was born in Quispicanchi Province to Juan Egidio Garmendia Picoaga and Ildefonsa Raymunda Puértolas Caller.

In 1854, Garmendia married Antonia Nadal Picoaga, by whom he was to have four children. Together they went on a trip to Europe and visited industrial plants there. Having learned about modern accessories and mechanisms used in Europe, Garmendia returned to Peru, and played a significant role in the textile boom of Cusco.

He founded one of the first industrial companies in Cusco, the textile factory Fàbrica de Tejidos Lucre, one of the city's major manufacturing companies.

== Political career and death ==
Garmendia was a member of the Civilista Party of Peru.

He served as prefect and mayor of Cusco from 1851 to 1852 and later as vice president under President Manuel Pardo y Lavalle.

He died in Piacenza, Italy, on 13 February 1873 from hepatitis.
