= Juan Antonio Ribeyro Estrada =

Peruvian politician

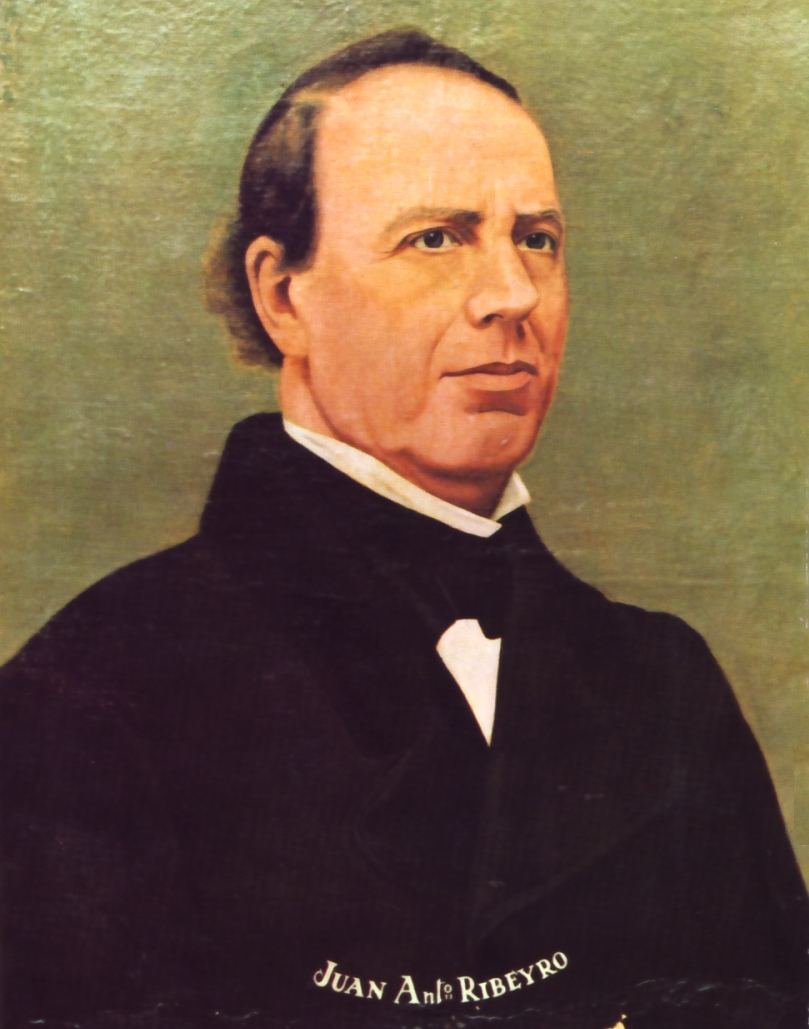

Juan Antonio Ribeyro Estada (1810 – December 16, 1886) was a 19th-century Peruvian politician. He was Prime Minister of Peru (1863 – August 1864). He was President of the Supreme Court of Peru (1858, 1861, 1870, 1877, 1879–1884, 1886). He served in the Chamber of Deputies of Peru.

Family Tree

Preceded by Francisco Javier Mariátegui	President of the Supreme Court of Peru; 1858	Succeeded by Juan Mariano Cossío
Preceded by Luciano Cúneo	President of the Supreme Court of Peru; 1861	Succeeded by Juan Mariano Cossío
Preceded by Juan Antonio Pezet	Prime Minister of Peru; 1863 – August 1864	Succeeded by Manuel Costas Arce
Preceded by Francisco Javier Mariátegui	President of the Supreme Court of Peru; 1870	Succeeded by Juan Mariano Cossío
Preceded by Antonio Arenas	President of the Supreme Court of Peru; 1877	Succeeded by Juan Oviedo
Preceded by Juan Oviedo	President of the Supreme Court of Peru; 1879–1884	Succeeded by Antonio Arenas Merino
Preceded by Antonio Arenas Merino	President of the Supreme Court of Peru; 1886	Succeeded by José Eusebio Sánchez

== Bibliography ==
- Basadre Grohmann, Jorge (1998) Historia de la República del Perú. 1822 - 1933, 8th edition, Volumes 5-7, Editada por el Diario "La República" de Lima y la Universidad "Ricardo Palma". Impreso en Santiago de Chile, ISBN 9789972205668
- Tauro del Pino, Alberto (2001) Enciclopedia ilustrada del Perú : síntesis del conocimiento integral del Perú, desde sus orígenes hasta la actualidad. 3rd edition. Volume 14. Lima: PEISA. ISBN 9789972401497
- Vargas Ugarte, Rubén: Historia General del Perú. Tomo IX. Primera Edición. Editor Carlos Milla Batres. Lima, Perú, 1971.
