= Mariano Herencia Zevallos =

Peruvian Army colonel and politician

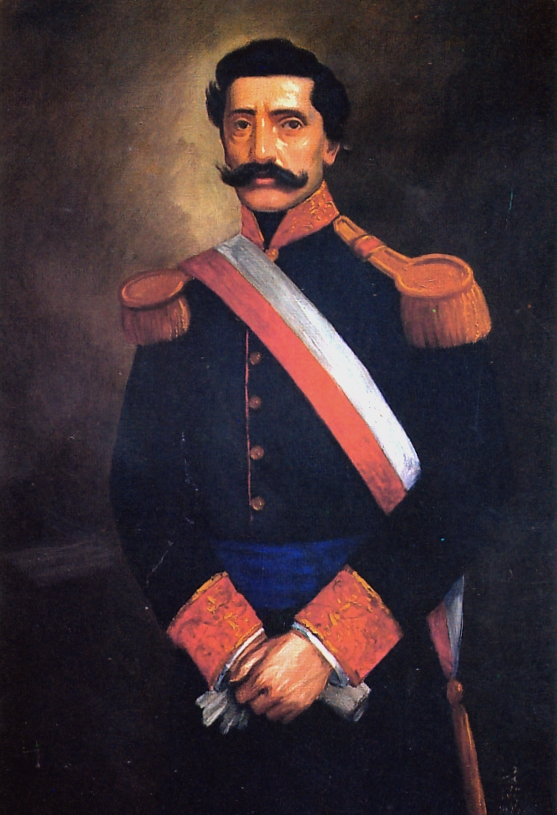
- Herencia Zevallos in 1872

Interim President of Peru
- In office July 26, 1872 – August 2, 1872
- Preceded by: Tomás Gutiérrez
- Succeeded by: Manuel Pardo y Lavalle

First Vice President of Peru
- In office August 2, 1868 – July 27, 1872

Personal details
- Born: October 15, 1820 Supalla, Peru
- Died: February 2, 1873 (aged 52) Lima, Peru

Mariano Herencia Zevallos (October 15, 1820 – February 2, 1873) was a Peruvian Army colonel and politician who briefly served as Interim President of Peru in 1872, following the murder of President José Balta.

After the fall of the Tomás Gutiérrez regime, Herencia Zevallos assumed power in accordance with the 1860 constitution. Herencia completed the last week of Balta's term in office and handed power over to his elected successor, Manuel Pardo.

He served as the President of the Constituent Congress in 1867, and first vice president from 1868 to 1872.

Herencia was assassinated on February 2, 1873.

== See also ==
- List of presidents of Peru
- History of Peru

Political offices
Preceded by Tomás Gutiérrez	Interim President of Peru; 1872	Succeeded by Manuel Pardo
