= OjoPúblico =

- Website type: Online newspaper
- Available in: Spanish
- Founded: 2014
- Headquarters: Lima, {{{location_country}}}
- Website: ojo-publico.com

OjoPúblico is a Peruvian investigative journalism website founded in 2014 by journalists Oscar Castilla Contreras, Nelly Luna Amancio, David Hidalgo and Fabiola Torres, as well as the programmer Antonio Cucho. It investigates issues concerning human rights, corruption, drug trafficking, environment, health and transparency, among others.

== Organization ==
OjoPúblico is a nonprofit journalistic organization based in Lima. The organization holds goals of promoting democracy, transparency, accountability and access to public information. It runs the OjoBiónico fact-checking page. It also promotes investigative journalism and the training for reporters with OjoLab.

== Work ==
OjoPúblico's series on illegal gold mining in South America was translated and reposted by Insight Crime, an online publication on organized crime in South America.

=== Panama Papers ===
OjoPúblico is one of the news organizations participating in the Panama Papers investigation into the data leaked from the Mossack Fonseca law offices.

The news outlet also reported as part of the Panama Papers investigation that Nicolás Lúcar and his wife Frances Crousillat, the producers of the talk show Señora León featuring Mexican actress and singer Laura León, had opened an offshore company to avoid taxes in Peru.

OjoPúblico also discovered as part of the Panama Papers investigation that Mossack Fonseca counted among its clients Ment Dijkhuizen Cáceres Floor, a Peruvian of Dutch descent who had been sentenced to 25 years in prison for money laundering following the seizure of 1.6 tons of cocaine in the Netherlands. Dijkhuizen had already fallen under suspicion and been questioned by the Peruvian drug police, (Dirandro), in connection with 200 kg of cocaine discovered in a 2003 shipment from his asparagus enterprise to a Spanish port. Massack Fonseca helped him to create an elaborate network of shell companies.

== Awards ==
- Best investigation of the year, Data Journalism Awards 2015, organized by the Global Editors Network (GEN)
- Angel Escobar Jurado Journalism and Human Rights Award, presented on December 8, 2015, by the National Human Rights Coordinator (CNDDHH )
- Third Place in 2016 Latin American Awards for Investigative Journalism, granted by Ipys and Transparency International
- 2017 Excellence in Journalism Award by the Inter-American Press Society
