= 1962 Peruvian coup d'état =

- Part of the Moderate civil reformism
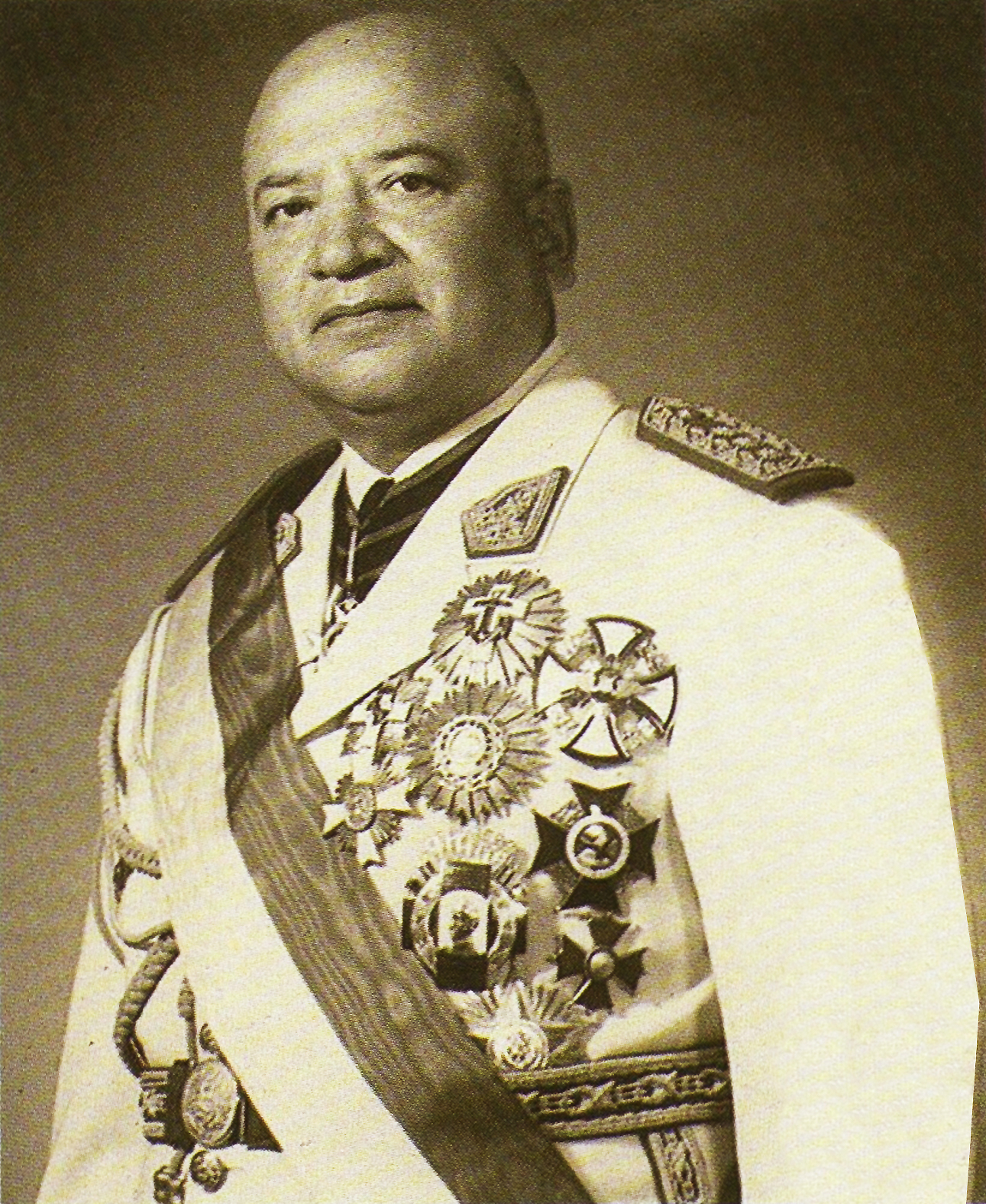
- Ricardo Pérez Godoy, official portrait in 1962
Date	18 July 1962
Location	Palacio de Gobierno, Lima
Result	Overthrow of President Manuel Prado Ugarteche and the Congress of Peru. Ricardo Pérez Godoy becomes President of Peru

Belligerents
Government of Peru	Armed Forces of Peru

Commanders and leaders
Manuel Prado Ugarteche	Ricardo Pérez Godoy

The 1962 Peruvian coup d'état was promoted by the then Chief of the Joint Command of the Peruvian Armed Forces, General Ricardo Pérez Godoy, against the outgoing government of Manuel Prado Ugarteche for alleged irregularities in the electoral process of that year.

== Background ==
The Peruvian Armed Forces had been opposed to the Prado administration as it made reformist measures focused on civilian life, which resulted with the military receiving less support from the traditional elites and the Catholic Church. The military and the aristocrats also viewed the American Popular Revolutionary Alliance as their enemy as they feared constitutional reform, land reform and the political inclusion of the indigenous peoples of Peru.

In the general elections of 1962, called for June 10 by Peruvian president Manuel Prado Ugarteche, were presented as candidates for the presidential chair César Pando Egúsquiza of the National Liberation Front, Luciano Castillo Colonna of the Socialist Party of Peru, Alberto Ruiz Eldredge for the Progressive Social Movement, Héctor Cornejo Chávez of the Christian Democracy, former President Manuel A. Odría of the Odriist National Union, the architect Fernando Belaúnde for Popular Action and Víctor Raúl Haya de la Torre of the Peruvian Aprista Party, these last three being the applicants with the greatest possibilities.

During the electoral process and the counting of the votes, the press and the Armed Forces denounced a series of irregularities before the National Jury of Elections. The newspapers announced that the Prado government and his party, the Peruvian Democratic Movement, favored the Aprista Party, and considered it as the ruling party. On the other hand, the delay in the delivery of the official results, as well as an alleged adulteration of the figures and of duplicate votes.

The result of the vote gave victory to Haya de la Torre, followed by candidate Belaúnde from Popular Action and in third place to Odría from Odriist National Union, but neither could exceed the electoral third (33% of valid votes) required by the 1933 Constitution. As for the National Congress to elect the new president among the three candidates with the highest vote. Given the situation, Haya de la Torre sought Belaúnde's support, but the architect declined pending the JNE's resolution in front of the allegations of fraud. Belaúnde would ultimately support the charges of fraud and would receive backing from the military.

Haya de la Torre was vetoed by the Armed Forces that threatened to rise up if the Aprista leader was chosen as the winner, so he pragmatically agreed with Odría. Both candidates had great parliamentary support, and they made an agreement for the second to assume the Presidency, and for Manuel Seoane Corrales, who was a member of the APRA electoral board, to assume the First Vice Presidency.

The alleged irregularities in the elections, the fears of a government with Aprist representation and the economic and social chaos of 1948, when the revolt of October 3 occurred during the government of José Luis Bustamante y Rivero, made the Armed Forces demand the annulment of the electoral process. On July 17, the National Jury of Elections rejected the request for annulment. In the face of the refusal, the Armed Forces staged the first institutional coup in their history.

== The coup of July 18 ==
On July 18, 1962, just eleven days after the change of government, the Government Palace guard was absent and at 03:20 am, an armored division commanded by Colonel Gonzalo Briceño Zevallos stormed the government headquarters and detained the president. Some sectors of the population, mostly Aprists, came out to demonstrate against the coup.

== Aftermath ==
That same day, a government military junta was formed that annulled the elections and called other new elections for 1963, while deposed president Prado was transported to the Callao naval arsenal and embarked on the BAP Callao (anchored on San Lorenzo Island) where he was kidnapped and detained until the end of his term, on July 28. On August 1, he voluntarily left the country and settled in Paris.

The junta was formed by Ricardo Pérez Godoy, then Chief of the Joint Command of the Armed Forces, and three ministers: Army General Nicolás Lindley as President of the Council of Ministers and Minister of War, Lieutenant General of the Air Force Pedro Vargas Prada, as Minister of Aviation, and Vice Admiral Juan Francisco Torres Matos, as Minister of the Navy.

The new government proposed to organize new elections scheduled for 1963, for which they would guarantee transparency and a fair process. For this, the Board depurated and modernized the Electoral Registry, and promulgated by Decree Law No. 14207 the new Electoral Statute in which the single identification card and the distributing number were introduced for the first time. Likewise, a new National Jury of Elections was set up.

The Kennedy administration in the United States responded to the coup by applying sanctions and refusing to recognise the junta. However, once it became clear that the junta was remaining in control and this policy was out of step with the rest of Latin America, Kennedy acquiesced and normalised relations.
