= History of Peru (1956–1968) =

Period of the history of Peru

Peruvian Republic República Peruana
- 1956–1968
- Flag Coat of arms
- Motto: "Firme y feliz por la unión" (Spanish) "Firm and Happy for the Union"
- Anthem: "Himno Nacional del Perú" (Spanish) "National Anthem of Peru" March: "Marcha de Banderas" (Spanish) "March of Flags"
- Capital: Lima
- Common languages: Spanish (official)
- Religion: Roman Catholicism
- Demonym: Peruvian
- Government: Unitary presidential republic
- President
  - 1956–1962: Manuel Prado
  - 1962–1963: Ricardo Pérez
  - 1963: Nicolás Lindley
  - 1963–1968: Fernando Belaúnde
- Legislature: National Congress
- Historical era: Cold War
  - General elections: 17 June 1956
  - Prado takes office: 28 July 1956
  - General elections: 10 June 1962
  - Coup d'état: 18 July 1962
  - General elections: 9 June 1963
  - Coup d'état: 3 October 1968
- Currency: Sol de oro
Preceded by	Succeeded by
Peru	Peru

The history of Peru between 1956 and 1968 corresponds to the period following the general elections that put an end to the eight-year military dictatorship that ruled the country since 1948, with Manuel Prado Ugarteche taking office for the second time in 1956. Peruvian historiography names this period as that of moderate civil reform (Spanish: reformismo civil moderado), alternatively democratic formality (Spanish: formalidad democrática).

Two major presidencies occupy this period: those of Manuel Prado Ugarteche (1956–1962) and Fernando Belaúnde (1963–1968). These were characterised by a notable economic expansion, development of national infrastructure, state services and the beginning of the migration of indigenous populations from the Andes to Lima and the main cities of the country. These events generated a process of urbanisation at the national level, with social demands that the state could not meet given a moderate growth of the economy.

During these years, there was not enough investment to generate enough jobs, with the consequent shortage of taxes to cover State expenses. Since governments did not have fiscal discipline, they generated an average inflation of 8% annually. The Cuban revolution, perpetrated by communist militants, generated illusions and growing social unrest encouraged by perceived shortcomings, without identifying their causes. This mobilisation generated the political beginning for new faces with the appearance in 1956 of the Christian Democratic Party and Popular Action, founded by Fernando Belaúnde, who was considered a centrist in his time, since he incorporated the people in his works with the motto, "the people did it" (Spanish: el pueblo lo hizo).

== History ==
=== Government of Manuel Prado (1956–1962) ===
Manuel Prado Ugarteche succeeded General Manuel A. Odría after coming first place in the 1956 elections, with the support of the American Popular Revolutionary Alliance (APRA), which gave in on several of its social demands after their failure, during the government of José Luis Bustamante y Rivero, having generated an inflation of 30.8% in 1948 (causing Odría's coup d'état). The economic development during the Odría regime was continued by the efficient economic policy of Pedro Beltrán Espantoso, director of the newspaper La Prensa and Minister of Finance between 1959 and 1961. The agrarian reform was already under discussion in order to massify agricultural production through training and land rationalisation, which had various unresolved problems such as financing. This delay was mistakenly taken as a boycott of the solution to the strong existing social inequalities, when reality indicates that fiscal accounts would not support the amount of credits and training necessary to execute the reform in Peru. In its beginnings, the reform was not planned as a gift to poor peasants, but as the next step to achieve the multiplication of agricultural production throughout Peru.

==== 1962 elections ====
In June 1962, general elections took place, after one of the longest and most eventful campaigns in Peruvian history. None of the 3 contenders, Víctor Raúl Haya de la Torre, leader and founder of APRA, Fernando Belaúnde Terry of Popular Action and General Manuel Odría were able to exceed a third of the votes.

Rumours of fraud in the 1962 elections renewed fears of social chaos that occurred in 1948 and the Peruvian Armed Forces carried out the first institutional coup d'état in its history, evidencing the depth of the debacle that originated during the government of Bustamante y Rivero and that no one wanted to live again. Inflation during the Bustamante y Rivero government in 1948 had reached 30.8%.

=== Military Junta (1962–1963) ===
On July 17, 1962, two weeks after the change of command, a collegiate government was formed made up of the president of the Joint Command and the general commanders of the Armed Forces: Ricardo Pérez Godoy and Nicolás Lindley López, Lieutenant General FAP Pedro Vargas Prada, and Vice Admiral Juan Francisco Torres Matos.

Before the year the junta replaced General Pérez Godoy with General Lindley. It was also characterised by immediately calling elections, for being the first case of an institutional government of the Armed Forces. Prado was transported to the Callao naval arsenal and embarked on the BAP Callao, anchored on San Lorenzo Island, in which he was kidnapped until the end of his term, on July 28. On August 1, he voluntarily left the country and settled in Paris.

A number of progressive reforms were carried out during his tenure, including a minimum wage law, stiff tax evasion penalties, and the establishment of a government housing bank to deal with workers’’ housing, problems of squatter settlements, and slum clearance.

=== Government of Fernando Belaúnde (1963–1968) ===
The Belaúnde regime was characterised by its reformism, with important initiatives such as an agrarian reform project, which was blocked by the surprising alliance in Congress formed by APRA and the conservative followers of Odría who saw a more pronounced fiscal deficit possible and higher inflation as a risk for the future of Peru. Since the fiscal support to train the new owners and finance the new agricultural ventures was not known, the project was stopped.

The reforms did not mature given the lack of continuity of the ministers. The APRA-UNO alliance censored 11 ministerial cabinets (an average of 6 months per minister). This resulted in the halting of reforms and productive stagnation, which contrasted with the increase in social demands in water, drainage, communications and others, given the incessant migration verified since 1950 and the prosperity experienced under the Odría government.

Political instability, together with the blockage of reforms from Congress, slowed the speed of investments in Peru. With less momentum but still growing, inflation became present in 1965. This process ended in protests and guerrilla actions in the department of Cuzco between 1964 and 1965. The lack of resources became evident with inflation of 16% in 1965 and 19%. in 1968. The boycotts of the APRA-UNO alliance generated a delay in investment activity and caused a budget deficit that they thought would be beneficial for the future presidential campaign, without imagining that they generated support for the coup d'état of Juan Velasco Alvarado in 1968.

Numerous public works were carried out under Belaúnde, such as hydroelectric plants, roads, irrigation projects, airports (the Jorge Chávez International Airport, one of the largest in South America, was inaugurated in 1965), multi-family housing, schools and hospitals. The development of education, health and state banking was promoted, but migration had just shown the growing needs and production did not generate enough revenue to develop all of Peru.

==== Crisis ====
Peru's international reserves between 1962 and 1968 averaged 140 million dollars, fluctuating. Exports rose from 555.1 million dollars to 839.8 million dollars, giving an idea of GDP growth in Peru, while inflation and the brakes on reforms prevented attention to all social shortcomings. Which indicates that a growth process should not be truncated just because there are deficiencies at one stage. The union organisations were infiltrated by foreign political ideologies that had as their axis the confrontation with private investment, instead of reconciling productive improvements they only proposed salary improvements at all levels. This confrontation stopped the creation of companies and the stagnation of state revenue.

The greater spending demands and the forced inorganic emission (manufacturing of excess money) generated inflation and monetary devaluation arrived in 1967, and shortly after the wage demands became more acute (due to an inflation produced by stopping investment, given the instability ). In the countryside, budgetary deficiencies in security and police intelligence allowed the illegal seizure of land by radical characters and romantic imitators of Fidel Castro and other communists. The government was overwhelmed due to the large size of the national territory, by the continuous demolition work of the APRA-UNO alliance and by the radical organisations infiltrated in the productive apparatus, who stopped the creation of more companies with ideological confrontations. Apparently all that was missing was a trigger for the military to bring order, just as Odría had done after the debacle of the government led by the Bustamante y Rivero and APRA alliance in 1948 (which left inflation of 30.8% when the average was 6%).

In August 1968, the Belaúnde Administration announced the settlement of a long-standing dispute with a subsidiary of Standard Oil of New Jersey over claims to the rich La Brea y Pariñas oil fields. However, widespread anger about Belaúnde's decision to pay the Standard Oil compensation for handing over the installation to Peru forced his cabinet to resign on October 1. A further cause of anger was that the document of agreement was given by Belaúnde to the press with the final page (page 11) missing and signatures were squeezed at the bottom of page 10. The missing page became a cause célèbre and was later shown on television containing the contribution that Belaúnde had promised to pay.

=== Society and economy ===
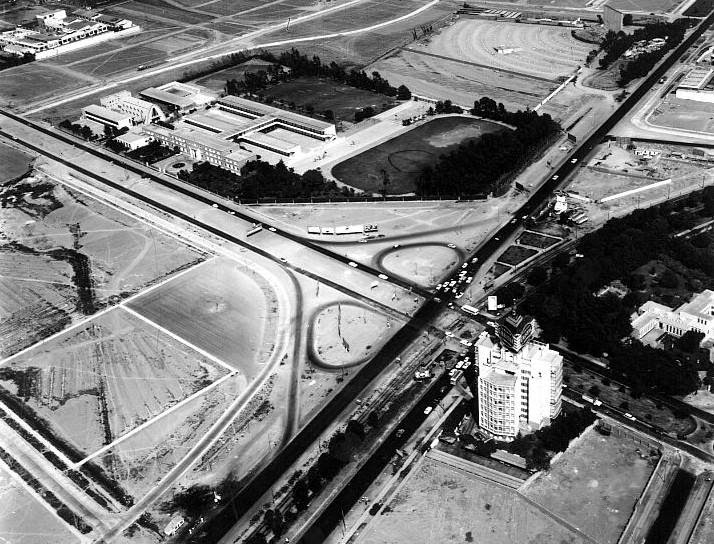
Aerial view of Limatambo Building, San Agustín school and Javier Prado Avenue in the 1960s.

Legal recognition was also given to hundreds of indigenous Indian communities, the hospital network was expanded into uncovered areas, and improvements were made in social security coverage. Migrations to the main cities gave rise to the appearance of the first human settlements in the urban periphery, today converted into districts since the promulgation of the 1993 Constitution of Peru. But initially, the stagnation caused by the lack of investment kept thousands in extreme poverty for several years. Migrants and their descendants would become the majority population of cities, which would lead to significant changes in culture, urban appearance and social coexistence. Between 1940 and 1972 the urban population of Peru would go from being just over 35% to 60% of the population.

The oil scandal, political instability and economic situation (by 1967 the sol had become seriously devalued). eventually led to the coup d'état of Juan Velasco Alvarado in 1968. The now overthrown Belaúnde spent the next decade in the United States, teaching at Harvard, Johns Hopkins and George Washington University. Meanwhile the so-called Revolutionary Government of the Armed Forces was established in Peru, which would rule the country until 1980.

== See also ==
- History of Peru
