= 1963 Peruvian general election =

- 9 June 1963
- Presidential election
- Turnout: 94.38%
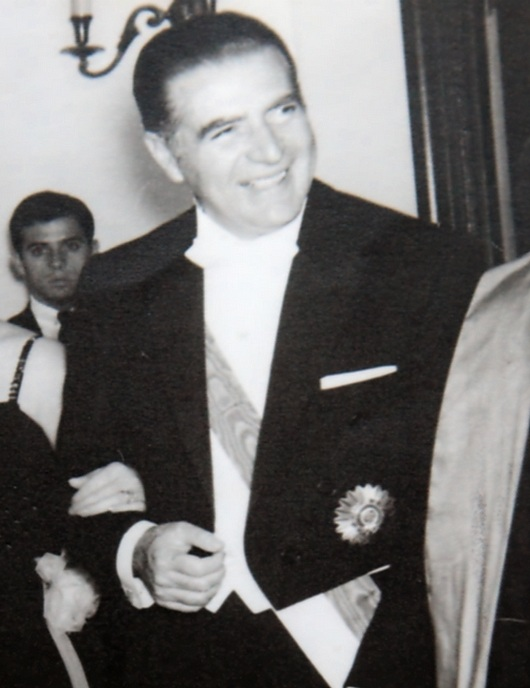

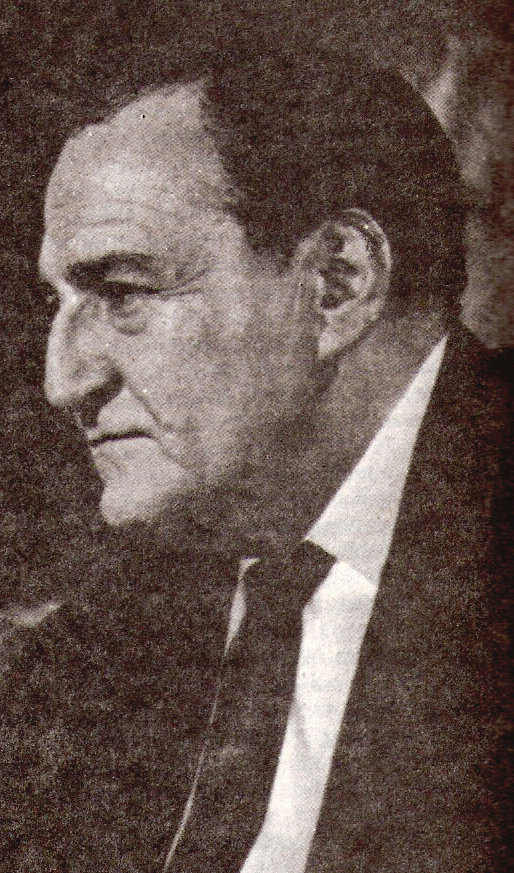
Nominee	Fernando Belaúnde Terry	Victor Raúl Haya de la Torre
Party	Popular Action	APRA
Alliance	AP–PDC
Running mate	Fernando Schwalb López Aldana; Javier Alva Orlandini	None
Popular vote	708,662	623,501
Percentage	39.05%	34.36%
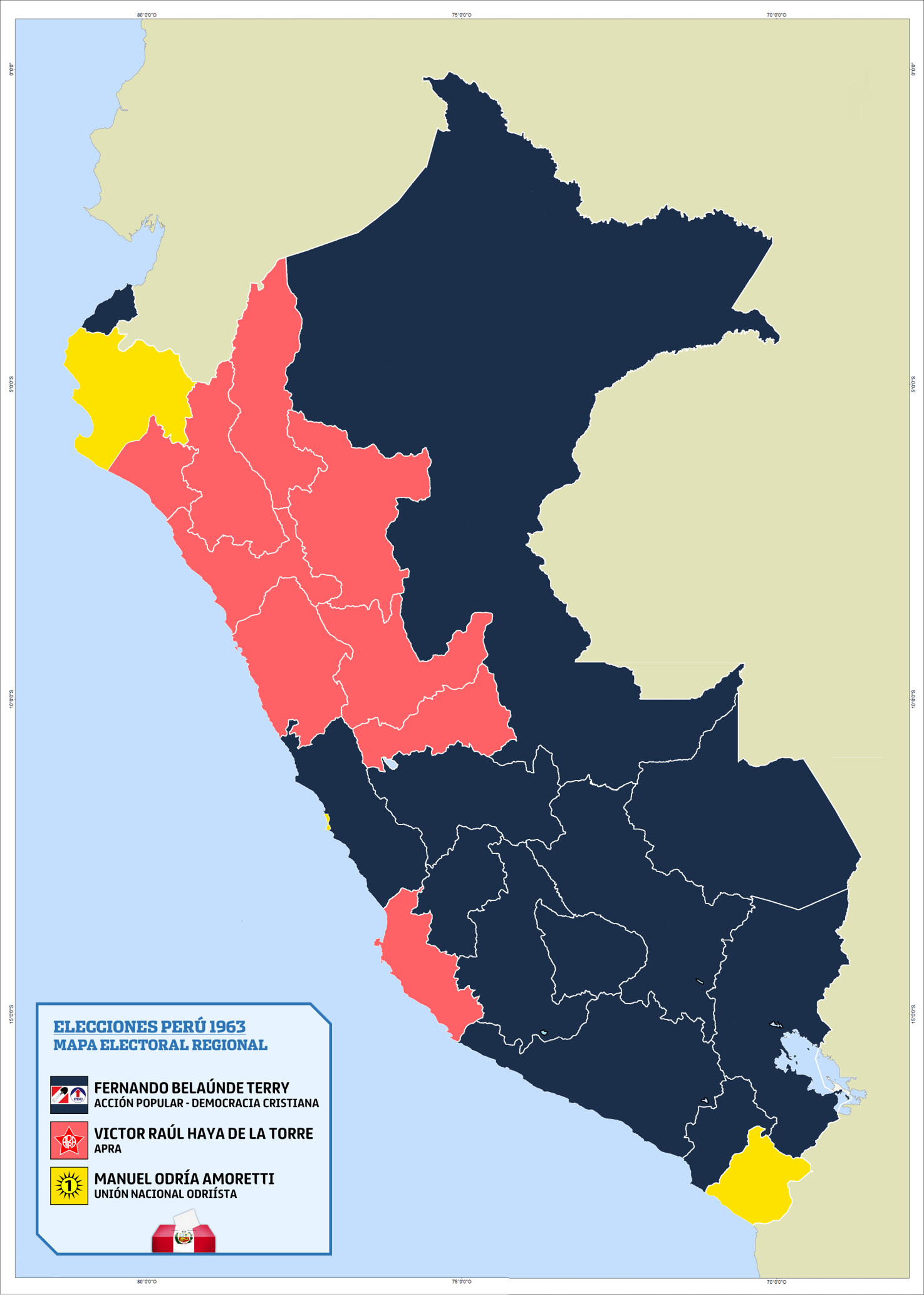
President before election
Nicolás Lindley López
Military Government Junta
Elected President
Fernando Belaúnde Terry
Popular Action

General elections were held in Peru on 9 June 1963 to elect the President and both houses of the Congress after the results of the 1962 elections were annulled following a military coup. The Peruvian Armed Forces, who controlled the nation as a military junta following the coup, largely controlled the electoral process to prevent the election of Víctor Raúl Haya de la Torre. Supported by Popular Action and the Christian Democrat Party, Fernando Belaúnde Terry won the presidential election with 39% of the vote, whilst the American Popular Revolutionary Alliance emerged as the largest party in both houses of Congress.

Following a coup on 3 October 1968, no further elections were held until a Constituent Assembly was elected in 1978.

== Results ==
=== President ===
Candidate	Party	Votes	%
Fernando Belaúnde Terry	Popular Action–Christian Democrat Party	708,662	39.05
Víctor Raúl Haya de la Torre	American Popular Revolutionary Alliance	623,501	34.36
Manuel A. Odría	Odriist National Union	463,085	25.52
Mario Samamé Boggio	Popular Union	19,320	1.06
Total		1,814,568	100.00
Valid votes		1,814,568	92.85
Invalid/blank votes		139,716	7.15
Total votes		1,954,284	100.00
Registered voters/turnout		2,070,718	94.38
Source: Nohlen

=== Senate ===
Party	Seats
American Popular Revolutionary Alliance	18
Popular Action	15
Odriist National Union	7
Christian Democrat Party	5
Total	45
Source: Nohlen

=== Chamber of Deputies ===
Party	Seats
American Popular Revolutionary Alliance	56
Popular Action	39
Odriist National Union	26
Christian Democrat Party	10
United Left	3
Peruvian Democratic Movement	2
Independents	3
Total	139
Source: Nohlen

== Reactions ==
Eight countries in the South America and the United States condemned the elections, saying that the Peruvian Armed Forces interfered with the process. After conciliatory measures by the military junta, the United States would recognize the armed forces as the government.

== Deputies ==
- Rafael Arcangel Avalos Garcia
