= 1962 Peruvian general election =

- 10 June 1962
- Presidential election
- Turnout: 88.66%
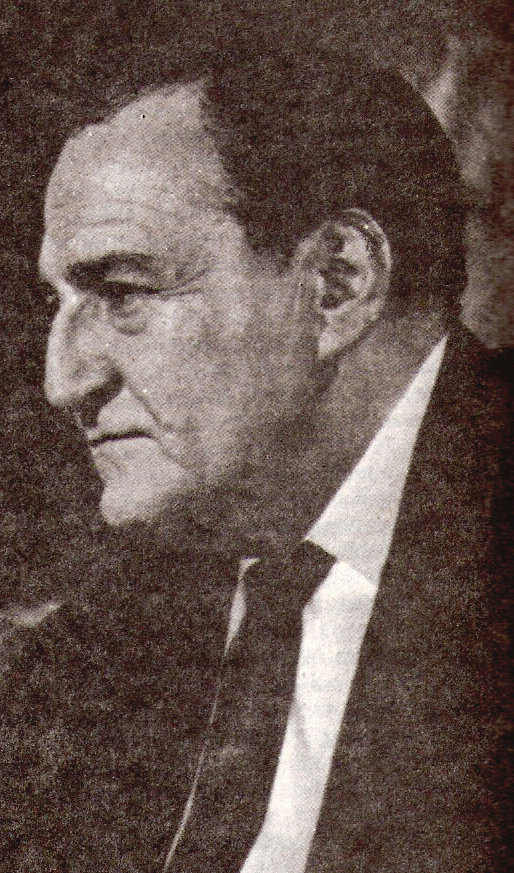

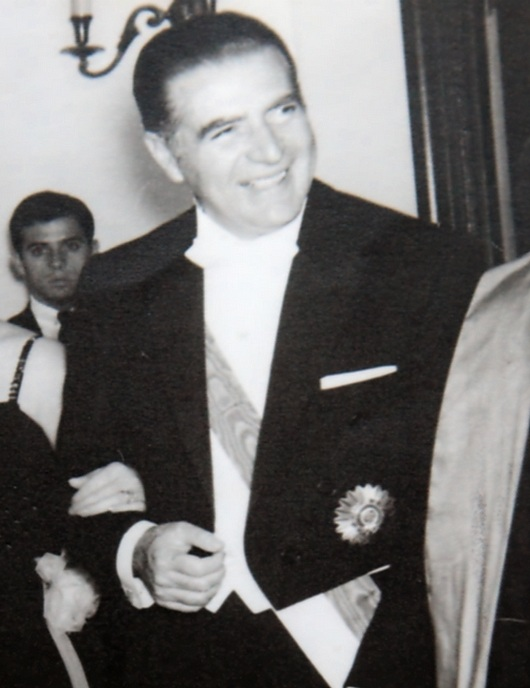

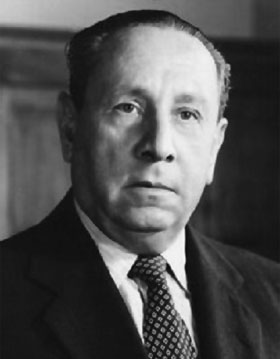
| Nominee | Víctor Raúl Haya de la Torre | Fernando Belaúnde Terry | Manuel A. Odría |
| Party | APRA | Popular Action | UNO |
| Popular vote | 557,007 | 544,180 | 480,378 |
| Percentage | 32.97% | 32.21% | 28.43% |
President before election
Manuel Prado Ugarteche
MDP
Elected President
Election annulled

General elections were held in Peru on 10 June 1962 to elect the President and both houses of Congress. Víctor Raúl Haya de la Torre of the Peruvian Aprista Party won the presidential election with 33% of the vote. However, this was below the constitutional requirement of one-third of the vote.

The military, who were opposed to Haya, claimed that electoral fraud had been carried out in some districts, and the results were later annulled following a military coup on 18 July led by Ricardo Pérez Godoy.

== Results ==
=== President ===
| Candidate | Party | Votes | % |
|---|---|---|---|
| Víctor Raúl Haya de la Torre | American Popular Revolutionary Alliance | 557,007 | 32.97 |
| Fernando Belaúnde Terry | Popular Action | 544,180 | 32.21 |
| Manuel A. Odría | Odriist National Union | 480,378 | 28.43 |
| Héctor Cornejo Chávez | Christian Democrat Party | 48,792 | 2.89 |
| César Pando Egúsquiza | National Liberation Front | 33,341 | 1.97 |
| Luciano Castillo Colonna | Socialist Party | 16,658 | 0.99 |
| Alberto Ruiz Eldredge | Progressive Social Movement | 9,202 | 0.54 |
| Total | | 1,689,558 | 100.00 |
| Valid votes | | 1,689,558 | 85.80 |
| Invalid/blank votes | | 279,730 | 14.20 |
| Total votes | | 1,969,288 | 100.00 |
| Registered voters/turnout | | 2,221,288 | 88.66 |
Source: Nohlen

=== Senate ===
| Party | Seats |
|---|---|
| Democratic Alliance (APRA–MDP) | 25 |
| Popular Action | 16 |
| Odriist National Union | 11 |
| Alcides Spelucín list | 1 |
| Cuzqueñista Union | 1 |
| National Liberation Front | 1 |
| Total | 55 |
Source: JNE

=== Chamber of Deputies ===
| Party | Seats |
|---|---|
| Democratic Alliance (APRA–MDP) | 85 |
| Popular Action | 61 |
| Odriist National Union | 33 |
| Christian Democrat Party | 2 |
| Alcides Spelucín list | 1 |
| Cuzqueñista Union | 1 |
| Huancavelicana Coalition | 1 |
| Moqueguano Independent Movement | 1 |
| Puneñista Parliamentary Union | 1 |
| Total | 186 |
Source: JNE
