= Rafael Arcangel Avalos Garcia =

Peruvian politician

Rafael Arcangel Avalos Garcia is a Peruvian politician leader born in the city of Mala on October 24, 1919, province of Cañete, located in the southern region of the department of Lima. As one of the original members of the Alianza Popular Revolucionaria Americana (APRA) he was elected mayor for the district of Mala from 1945 to 1948. He later became General Secretary for the Federacion Nacional de Campesinos del Peru (FENCAP). On June 9, 1963, after the military coup d'état of 1962, he represented the department of Lima once more during the general elections in Peru. He was elected Diputado and became a congressman for the Congress of the Republic of Peru from 1963 to 1968. He died on a Sunday, March 15, 2020, and was buried in El Parque del Recuerdo, Pachacamac, Peru.
