= Carlos Moreyra y Paz Soldán =

Peruvian engineer and politician

José Carlos Gregorio Moreyra y Paz Soldán, (Lima, Peru, 17 November 1898 – Lima, 16 November 1981) was a Peruvian engineer and politician. He served as Minister of Public Works and Development (1939–1944), Second Vice President of the Republic (1956–1962), Minister of Agriculture and President of the Council of Ministers.

== Early life ==
He was the son of Francisco de Paula Moreyra Riglos and Luisa Paz-Soldán Rouaud. His brother was historian Manuel Moreyra y Paz Soldán (1894–1986).

An agricultural engineer by profession, he was one of those who made the agricultural export sector of the Peruvian coast prosperity. He married Leonor García Sayán in 1933.

During Manuel Prado Ugarteche's first government, he was appointed Minister of Public Works and Development, and was a part of the long-standing cabinet headed by Alfredo Solf y Muro (1939–1944).

Along with his brothers, he inherited the former estate of the Counts of San Isidro, which his great-grandfather, José Gregorio Paz Soldán, acquired in 1853. He was also the owner of the Hacienda Santa Luisa.

He enrolled in the Peruvian Democratic Movement, the same one that launched Manuel Prado's candidacy for the 1956 general elections, called by the Odría dictatorship. He ran as a candidate for the second vice presidency, while Luis Gallo Porras was a candidate for the first vice presidency. In those elections in which the votes of the APRA militants decided Prado's victory, as he had promised to legalize that party. Thus began the so-called "Coexistence" between Pradismo and Aprismo.

In Prado's second government (1956–1962), Moreyra served as an effective liaison agent between the president and Pedro G. Beltrán, who criticized the government in the columns of the La Prensa newspaper. He had a decisive participation in the appointment of Beltrán as president of the Council of Ministers and Minister of Finance. Beltrán carried out fiscal and financial policy, putting finances in order and stabilizing the currency.

When Beltrán resigned in late 1961, Moreyra replaced him as chief of staff, but in the Agriculture Office. His cabinet was the last of President Prado, before the coup of 18 July 1962.
