= National Liberation Front (Peru) =

- Leader: César Pando Egúsquiza
- President: Salomón Bolo Hidalgo
- Secretary: César Pando Egúsquiza
- Founded: 1960
- Ideology: Statism; Indigenism; Progressivism; Egalitarianism; Browderism; Anti-imperialism; Left-wing populism Left-wing nationalism
- Political position: Left-wing

The National Liberation Front (FLN) was a political party in Peru founded in 1960 by Lieutenant General César Pando Egúsquiza, Salomón Bolo Hidalgo, and Genaro Carnero Checa. It participated in the 1962 elections, receiving support from various Marxist groups.

== History ==
=== Background ===
With the intention to participate in the 1962 general elections, the leadership of the Peruvian Communist Party decided to create the National Liberation Front. This was corroborated by Miguel Tauro Lama, who was the general secretary of the Peruvian Communist Youth at that time. During this period, the Communist Party was guided by the Browderist conception which sought the dissolution of the party organization within the popular front, considered as a grouping of individuals rather than social classes.

The National Liberation Front was influenced by Cuba. The objectives of the FLN were closely linked to those maintained by the Cuban revolution. The National Liberation Front was also influenced by the Peruvian Communist Party (PCP). The FLN, like the PCP, considered imperialism as the greatest enemy of Peru. FLN militants believed that the PCP was a patriotic organization that fought for culture and education.

=== National Liberation Front (FLN) ===
Founded on November 4, 1961, its objectives were the defense of national sovereignty against imperialism, a reassessment of agrarian reform, protection of indigenous communities, nationalization of natural resources, free medical care, equal rights for all women, improvement of working conditions, development of sources of employment, combatting oligarchy, holding municipal elections, and opposition to interventionist policy targeted toward the peoples of Latin America.

The FLN was considered to be close to the principles of the Cuban Revolution, the Peruvian Communist Party, as well as Socialism and Progressivism.

== Leaders ==
- César Pando Egúsquiza: Presidential candidate for the National Liberation Front party. Held the rank of Lieutenant Colonel.
- Salomón Bolo Hidalgo: Christian priest, founding member of the National Liberation Front, and president of the same party.
- Genaro Carnero Checa: Director of the magazine "1961" and founding member of the National Liberation Front.

== Election Participation ==
=== 1962 Elections ===
The 1962 Peruvian general election was held on June 10, 1962, to determine the new President of the Republic.

Víctor Raúl Haya de la Torre obtained the highest vote, but as he did not achieve citizen majority, so the Congress had to choose between him, Fernando Belaúnde Terry, and Manuel A. Odría. With César Pando Egúsquiza's candidacy, the National Liberation Front obtained 2.04% nationally.

Region	Number of Participating Lists	% Votes Winning List	% Votes Political Group	Group Place Obtained	Total Seats in Contention	Number of Seats Obtained
NATION	7		2.04%	0	1	0

Source: INFOGOB
