= Christian Democratic Party (Peru) =

Political party in Peru

Christian Democracy Democracia Cristiana (DC)
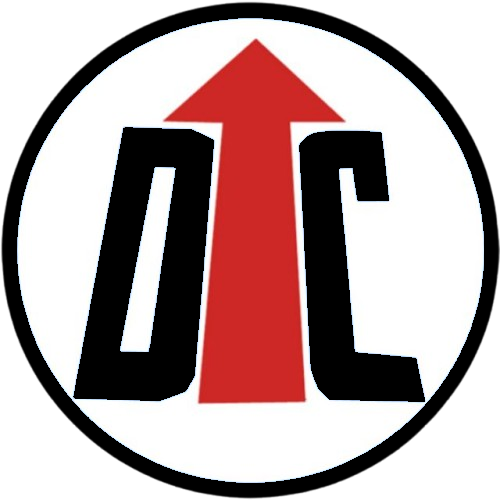
- Abbreviation: DC
- Founder: Héctor Cornejo Chávez
- Founded: 1956
- Ideology: Christian humanism
- Political position: Centre
- Regional affiliation: Christian Democrat Organization of America
- Colours
- Seats in Congress: 0 / 130
- Governorships: 0 / 25
- Regional Councillors: 0 / 274
- Province Mayorships: 0 / 196
- District Mayorships: 0 / 1,874

The Christian Democratic Party (Spanish: Partido Demócrata Cristiano), formerly known as Christian Democracy (Spanish: Democracia Cristiana), is a political party in Peru, founded in 1956 by Héctor Cornejo Chávez.

Not having participated in national politics since 1990, the party is currently not registered at the National Jury of Elections to formally participate in present election cycles.

== Development ==
The DC had its roots in the government of José Bustamante y Rivero who was overthrown in 1948 by Manuel A. Odría although it did not emerge as an organised political party until 1956 when it was one of a number of populist parties formed following Odria's announcement of a new democracy (the other major ones being Popular Action and the Progressive Social Movement).

The new party gained seats in both houses in the 1956 elections and initially they only concentrated their efforts on the Congress rather than running for the Presidency. A change in policy followed in 1962 when Cornejo was a candidate for the Presidency but he only managed 2.88% of the vote and the party was eliminated from Congress.

As a result of this failure and the coup that overthrew Manuel Prado Ugarteche, the DC threw in their lot with the Popular Action and as such returned to Congress in 1963 as junior partners in the coalition supporting new President Fernando Belaúnde Terry. The party returned to government as a junior partner in APRA-led government of Alan García, remaining in office until 1990.

== Ideology and divisions ==
The DC advocated a strong nationalism, a community-minded approach to politics and state interventionism, with a grouping on the left even advocating nationalisation of the oil industry. In the end the right of the party split off in 1966 to set up the Christian People's Party although in the short term at least the majority of the membership remained with the DC.

== Support ==
The DC gained a following in Lima to the extent that the party was able to defeat strong candidates from Popular Action and the Odriist National Union in order to have Luis Bedoya Reyes elected Mayor of Lima. In general, however, the party's prospects were hampered by an anti-clericalism prevalent in Peru and, whilst it gained some support amongst middle class women, it never seriously challenged Popular Action for the centre right vote.

=== Presidential elections ===
Year	Candidate	Party / Coalition	Votes	Percentage	Outcome
1962	Héctor Cornejo Chávez	Christian Democracy	48 828	2.89	4th
1963	Fernando Belaúnde	Popular Action - Christian Democracy Alliance	708 662	39.05	1st
1985	Alan García	Peruvian Aprista Party	3 457 030	53.11	1st
1990	Alfonso Barrantes	Socialist Left	320 108	4.80	4th

== Bibliography ==
- Hugo Neira, "Peru" in JP Bernard et al., Guide to the Political Parties of South America, Harmondsworth: Penguin, 1973
