= Víctor Raúl Haya de la Torre =

Peruvian politician, philosopher and author

Víctor Raúl Haya de la Torre OSP
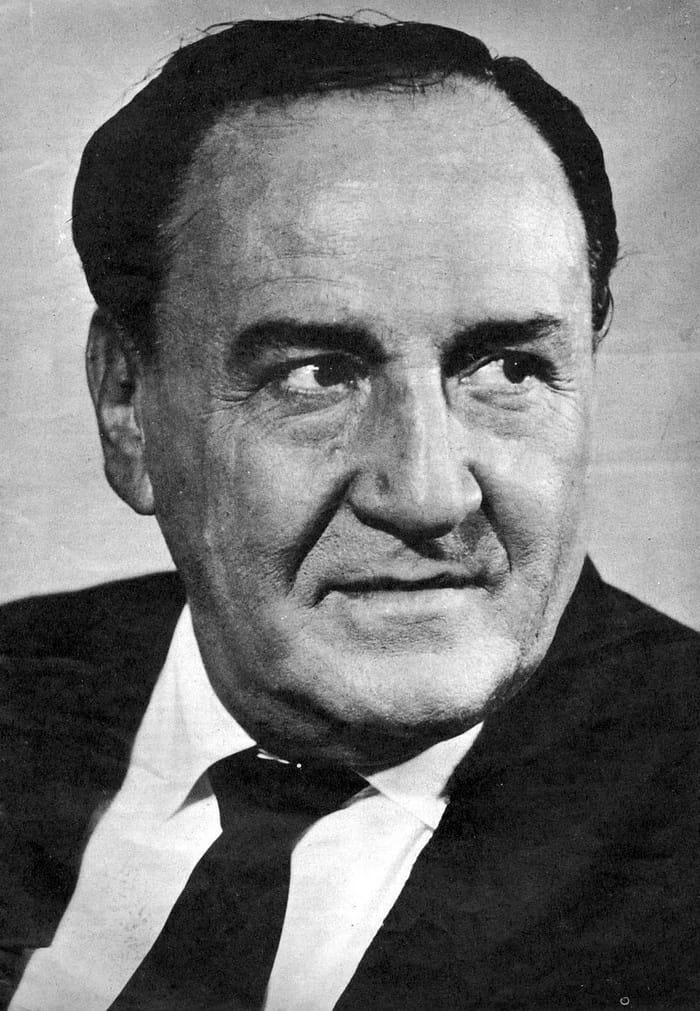

President of the Constituent Assembly
- In office July 28, 1978 – July 13, 1979
- Vice President: Luis Alberto Sánchez; Ernesto Alayza Grundy

Member of Constituent Assembly
- In office July 28, 1978 – July 13, 1979
- Constituency: National

Leader of the Peruvian Aprista Party
- In office September 20, 1930 – August 2, 1979
- Succeeded by: Armando Villanueva

Leader of the American Popular Revolutionary Alliance
- In office May 7, 1924 – August 2, 1979

Personal details
- Born: February 22, 1895 Trujillo, La Libertad, Peru
- Died: August 2, 1979 (aged 84) Lima, Peru
- Cause of death: Lung cancer
- Party: American Popular Revolutionary Alliance (Worldwide); Peruvian Aprista Party (National)
- Education: National University of Trujillo; National University of San Marcos; University of Oxford; London School of Economics
- Occupation: Politician, philosopher, author

Víctor Raúl Haya de la Torre (February 22, 1895 – August 2, 1979) was a Peruvian politician, philosopher, and author who founded the American Popular Revolutionary Alliance (APRA) political movement, the oldest currently existing political party in Peru by the name of the Peruvian Aprista Party (PAP).

Born to an aristocratic family in Trujillo, a city on the north Peruvian coast, he enrolled in the National University of Trujillo and then the School of Law of the National University of San Marcos. He soon stood out as a student leader supporting the working class. He participated in protests against the regime of Augusto B. Leguía, standing out as a vigorous and eloquent speaker, with great power of persuasion due to the depth of his ideas. Banished by Leguía in 1922, he emigrated to Mexico, where in 1924 he founded the APRA, a political movement with continental projection and a social democratic orientation, initially with a clear anti-imperialist position.

Returning to Peru in 1930 after a European and Latin American tour, he established the APRA party in Peru, the Peruvian Aprista Party, on whose political scene he would remain active from then until his death. He suffered imprisonment, exiles and political asylum. He ran for the presidency in the 1931 elections, losing to Luis Miguel Sánchez Cerro. Imprisoned in 1932 by the Sánchez Cerro administration, he was released in 1933, only to be persecuted again, already under the government of Óscar R. Benavides. He remained in hiding until 1945, when his party returned to legality; he supported the National Democratic Front, which elevated José Luis Bustamante y Rivero to the presidency. In 1948, his party was again banned and after the coup d'état by general Manuel A. Odría he was forced to take refuge in the Colombian embassy (1948–1954). In 1956, he contributed to the electoral victory of Manuel Prado Ugarteche, initiating the so-called "coexistence". Once again as presidential nominee, he placed first in the 1962 election, but the Armed Forces issued a veto against him, prompting a military coup that overthrew Prado and prevented his bidding to seal his victory in Congress in favor of Odría.

During the Armed Forces Revolutionary Government, he assembled and instructed a new generation of party leaders, which included his successor and future president of Peru, Alan García. He was overwhelmingly elected to the Constituent Assembly, being elected as the body's president, and leading the drafting of a new Peruvian constitution, which he would sign in his deathbed in July 1979. He died on August 2, 1979, and his remains rest in his hometown of Trujillo. He remains one of the most influential political thinkers in Peruvian history. His legacy is considered fundamental in Peruvian historiography, with his ideology coined as revolutionary by historians.

== Early life and education ==
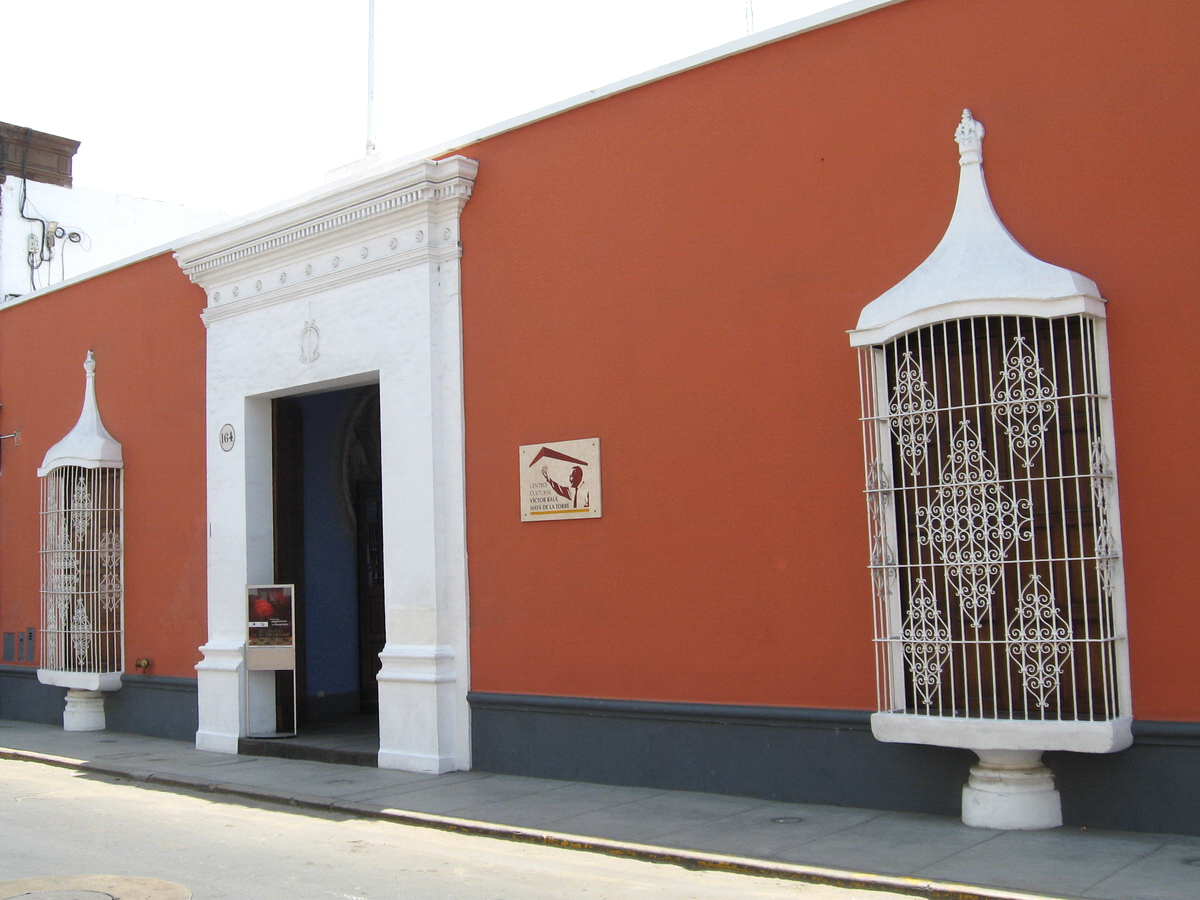
House where Haya de la Torre was born in Trujillo, La Libertad, Peru; currently, it houses the cultural center and museum that bears his name.

Víctor Raúl Haya de la Torre was born in the northern Peruvian city of Trujillo on February 22, 1895. He was the son of Raúl Edmundo Haya y de Cárdenas, also from Trujillo, and Zoila Victoria de la Torre y de Cárdenas, who were also cousins. His birth is commemorated as Fraternity Day every February 22 by the Peruvian Aprista Party.

Haya studied his primary and secondary education at the Seminary of San Carlos School and San Marcelo School of Trujillo. In 1913, he enrolled in the National University of Trujillo to study literature, where he met and forged a solid friendship with the Peruvian poet César Vallejo. Both, along with other students and under the leadership of Antenor Orrego and José Eulogio Garrido, integrated the so-called "Trujillo bohemia", where he was known as "The Prince of Misfortune" among his classmates. This intellectual group was later baptized as the North Group.

Subsequently, he continued his undergraduate education at the National University of San Marcos in Lima, where he pursued a law degree. In 1917, he was introduced to politician and writer Manuel González Prada, whom is cited as his main influence in the capital, developing political concerns derived from the radicalism of said intellectual. In 1918, he was one of those who carried his coffin. Historians have debated over the fact that González Prada is the precursor of Aprismo.

=== Student leader (1919–1923) ===
In January 1919, he joined the college commission that supported the workers' struggle for the establishment of the eight-hour labor reform. Contrary to popular belief, Haya de la Torre did not assume a leading role in the development of the strike, but rather played a small role as a student leader. This episode marked the beginning of Haya's active participation in Peruvian politics. In October of that same year, he was elected president of the Peruvian Student Federation. He was linked with all sectors of society. He led movements in favor of university reform in Peru and labor organizations. He participated in the first National Student Congress, held in Cusco (March 1920), where the project to create the "popular universities" was approved, which in 1922 took shape under the name of "González Prada", night schools for workers, which according to some historians formed the foundation for his party. He was instrumental in bringing the ideas of the Argentine University Reform movement (La Reforma) to San Marcos, and administrative reforms were instituted in 1919. Part of the reform movement was university extension programs, through which the university students hoped to reach the working classes.

He launched numerous protests against the government of Augusto B. Leguía when, around 1923, began to plot his perpetuation in power (this regime would later be known as the Eleven-Year Rule). One of the most significant of these protests was the opposition campaign to the projected official consecration of the country to the Sacred Heart order, promoted by the Archbishop of Lima, Emilio Lisson, to legitimize the dictatorial regime. During the street protest, a student and a worker died (May 23, 1923), which became a symbol of student-worker unity. The consecration ceremony was finally suspended by the archbishop. Later, Haya led the radical student-worker magazine Claridad, in collaboration with José Carlos Mariátegui, as "organ of the free youth of Peru" and of the popular universities.

Haya also taught at the Colegio Anglo-Peruano (now Colegio San Andres), a school operated by the Free Church of Scotland in Lima. He was deeply influenced by the headmaster of the school, John A. Mackay, a Free Church missionary. In October 1923, he was arrested and detained in the El Frontón prison, where he went on a hunger strike; six days after the strike, he was shipped in the small steam train Negada and deported to Panama.

== Exile; Foundation of the APRA ==
Flag of the United States of Indoamerica.

In Panama, Haya stayed for two weeks, before heading to Cuba. From there he went to Mexico, invited by José Vasconcelos, then Secretary of Public Education, to collaborate as his secretary. He arrived in Mexico City on November 16, 1923. He then made contact with the Mexican Revolution, appreciating the socio-economic changes that took place in that country.

He contacted Mexican students to encourage them to develop a continental student and labor fraternity. It was precisely in Mexico City that, on May 7, 1924, he founded the American Popular Revolutionary Alliance. As it can be deduced from its name, Haya de la Torre's initial political option sought to consolidate itself into a project for Latin America, as a pan-Latin American movement.

In a simple ceremony, he presented the students of Mexico with the flag of Indoamerica, on which occasion he said: «This flag that I give you will first fly over the dreamy crowds of the youth that are opening the way, and later they will be the people who shake it in the shuddering tumult of their struggles ». Its doctrinal foundations were presented two years later, in the manifesto entitled What is the APRA?. Initially published in English in the Labour Monthly magazine in London, in December 1926, and later translated into Spanish and reproduced in various Latin American publications. In this document, it exposes the five basic points of the Aprista doctrine:

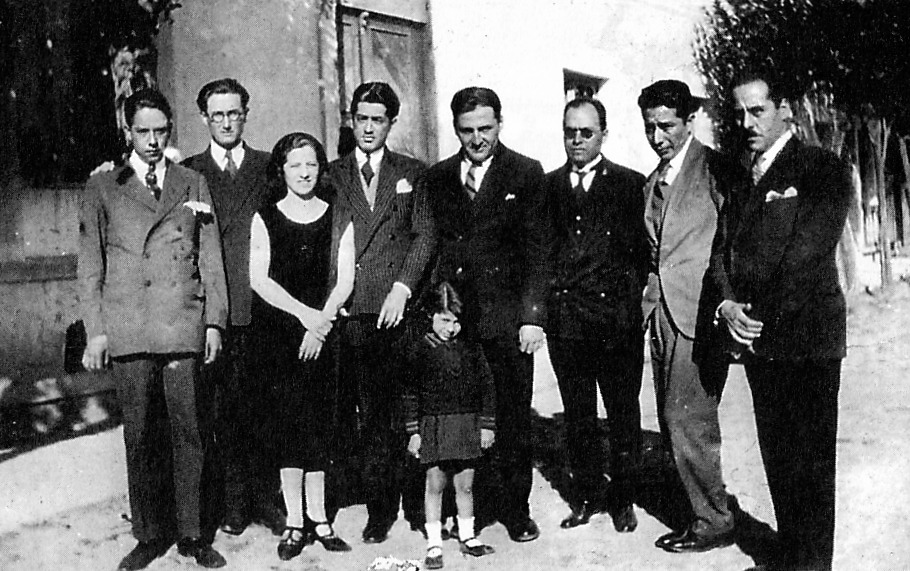
Committee of Exiled Apristas, 1929. From left to right: Pavletich, Carlos Manuel Cox, Magda Portal, Serafín Delmar, Víctor Raúl Haya de la Torre and Enríque Vásquez Díaz.

In September 1924 he traveled to Russia, where he made contact with the Russian Revolution, which served as a source of inspiration for his ideology. He also traveled through Switzerland, Italy and France. In 1925, he settled in England, where, between 1926 and 1927, he studied economics at the London School of Economics and then anthropology at the University of Oxford, where he would later become a professor (in 1964).

Haya devoted himself entirely to forming a great movement that could represent the excluded masses of "Indoamerica". The APRA had its first committee in Paris (founded on January 22, 1927), followed in Buenos Aires, Mexico City, and La Paz. The APRA was born as an eminently anti-oligarchic and anti-imperialist force. It was early linked to Marxism but clearly disagreed with communism, as it considered it a totalitarian political system. In 1927, he published his first book, entitled For the Emancipation of Latin America, where he exposed the Aprista doctrine. In May 1928, he finished writing his book The anti-imperialism and APRA, a work that for economic reasons would not come to light until 1935.

In February 1927, he participated in the First Anti-imperialist Congress in Brussels, in which he raised the difference between APRA and communism. In November of that year he left Europe and returned to America, passing through New York City before returning to Mexico. He then undertook a tour of Guatemala, El Salvador, Costa Rica and, again, Panama, being prevented from landing in the Canal Zone and, rather, was exiled again to Europe on December 16, 1928. He spent some time in Berlin and in other cities until June 1931. In the meantime, the government of Leguía was overthrown by the Peruvian Army led by Luis Miguel Sánchez Cerro on August 25, 1930. Haya returned to Peru and founded the Peruvian Aprista Party (PAP) on September 20, 1930.

== 1931 presidential election ==
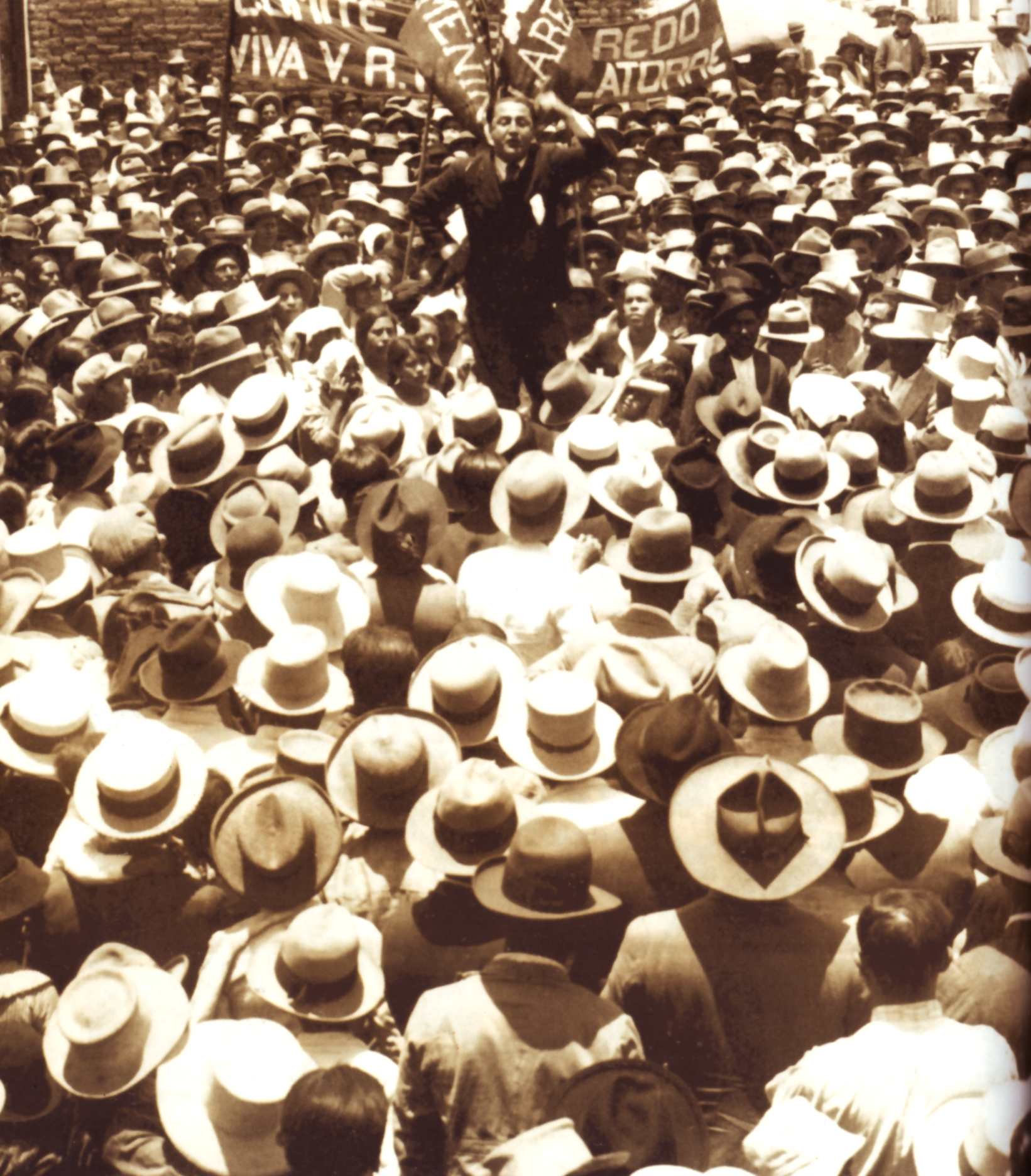
Haya de la Torre speaking to the peasants of the Hacienda Laredo, La Libertad, 1931.

After having lived in exile as a consequence of his fight against the Leguía administration, Haya de la Torre returned to Peru, having been nominated as presidential candidate for the 1931 general election with the newly founded Peruvian Aprista Party. He first arrived in Talara (July 12, 1931), and was received in his hometown (July 25), and finally entered Lima (August 15), where before a huge crowd gathered in Plaza de Acho, he exposed the party's program, in which he emphasized state intervention in the economy (August 23). The APRA campaign introduced means never before seen in the elections in Peru: street graffiti in all the cities of the country; candidates called by name – "Víctor Raúl", "Luis Alberto", etc.—; inclusion of non-voters —JAP (Aprista Youth), CHAP (Aprista Boys) -; own hymn, which superimposed the lyrics to the music of the French Marseillaise – the Aprista Marseillaise; a flag for the party identifying the supporters; supporters called "companions" holding up white scarves, and the famous "SEASAP" ("Only APRA will save Peru"). A kind of cult figure of Haya began in the party, who was at the same time Víctor Raúl, the boss, the guide and the master.

According to the Electoral Jury that directed this election, Haya placed second with 35% of the popular vote, behind Luis Miguel Sánchez Cerro (Revolutionary Union); however, Haya and the APRA as a whole never recognized the official results or the new government.

== Presidency of Luis Miguel Sánchez Cerro and the Great Clandestinity (1931–1945) ==
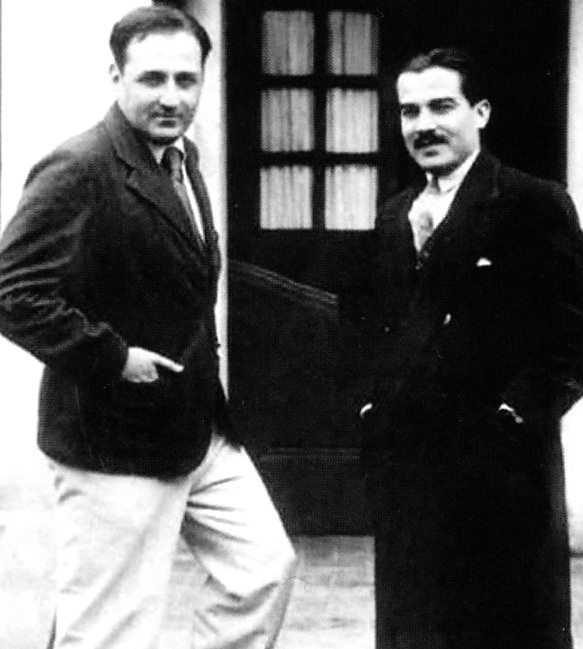
Víctor Raúl Haya de la Torre and Luis Heysen, one day after the former's release from prison. August 11, 1933.

The Sánchez Cerro government was authoritarian and repressive. Haya de la Torre was subsequently arrested, and the APRA congressional representation was ousted in January 1932, prompting popular protests across the country. In the city of Trujillo, a failed APRA armed uprising took place that led to clashes between the APRA members and the Armed Forces of Peru. The insurrection was harshly repressed, hundreds of Apristas were detained, and over 6000 were executed in front of the Peruvian ruins of Chan Chan (on the outskirts of Trujillo). The so-called "Trujillo Revolution", as the Apristas know it, was parallel to other revolutionary movements in various parts of the country (such as Huaraz and Huari).

In spite of the revolution, the Peruvian Congress amended the Constitution, banning all "international" parties. Based on this, and invoking that the nation was in danger, the government declared the Peruvian Aprista Party illegal in 1932. However, president Sánchez Cerro was assassinated with several shots at point-blank range on April 30, 1933, in the Campo de Marte of Lima. The perpetrator of the assassination was an APRA member identified as Alejandro Mendoza Leyva, who was killed on the spot, although the APRA leadership could not be syndicated as the intellectual author of the crime, due to lack of evidence.

After the death of Sánchez Cerro, former president and general Óscar R. Benavides took office, who expressed hope in "peace and harmony" for Peru. Haya was released from prison on August 10, 1933, as other Aprista prisoners were also released from jails and many others returned from exile. But this release would not last long. Following the Aprista conspiracy of El Agustino, in November 1934, the government resumed its anti-Aprista persecution. Thus began, for Haya and his supporters, the stage of "the great clandestinity", which would only conclude, officially, in 1945 (to increase again between 1948 and 1956, under Manuel A. Odría administration).

In the 1936 presidential elections, the Peruvian Aprista Party supported Luis Antonio Eguiguren, who attained the highest number of votes; however, Congress invalidated the election on the grounds that the votes in favor of Eguiguren came from members of an outlawed party, an unheard-of argument, even more so considering that suffrage was secret.

== Presidency of José Luis Bustamante y Rivero (1945–1948) ==
In 1945, the Peruvian Aprista Party returned to legality by participating in the coalition of the National Democratic Front (FDN). Haya de la Torre agreed to launch jurist José Luis Bustamante y Rivero as the presidential nominee for FDN. On May 20, 1945, Haya reappeared in public, after ten years in hiding, on the occasion in which he delivered his "Reencounter Speech", before a massive concentration of his supporters in Plaza San Martín.

Bustamante y Rivero was ultimately elected president. Thanks to their electoral victory, Haya and the party controlled the legislative caucus as a whole. From there, they managed to approve various measures in favor of the Peruvian people, in addition to demanding greater speed for the reforms that Bustamante was trying to stop. They made vigorous pressure to achieve their objectives, provoking the reaction of the conservative elite, which originated a stage of misrule and anarchy that put the regime in check. In view of this, the opposition caucus failed to attend Congress, causing its recess. Uprisings occurred throughout the country, including the Aprista carried out in the port of Callao. Bustamante was forced to govern by decree, and banned the party for a second time while the oligarchy knocked on the door of the military barracks. Finally, all this led to the coup propelled by Manuel A. Odría, former Minister of Government and Police. Subsequently, Haya went into hiding, along with other party leaders.

== Political asylum case and Thirty Years of Aprismo (1948–1954) ==
Haya de la Torre was persecuted and Bustamante deported. Haya took refuge in the Colombian embassy in Lima where he requested political asylum for sixty-three months since the Odría administration refused to grant the safe-conduct to leave the country, a situation that became an important reference case in international law.

In 1954, Haya was authorized to leave Peru thanks to international pressure – he was friends with various figures, such as Albert Einstein - and published an article in Life magazine where he began to outline the "democratic anti-imperialism without empire". According to some historians, Haya abandoned his original ideology and made a conservative turn with "Thirty Years of Aprismo", a reflective work where Haya analyzed the APRA's position and amended its program.

== The Coexistence (1956–1962) ==
In 1956, the three main presidential candidates assured the return to legality of the APRA party; by virtue of this offer, Haya de la Torre initially supported businessman Hernando de Lavalle, and later Manuel Prado Ugarteche, a symbol of economic power, who, thanks to this support, was successful. Peru would oversee a mega-coalition that buttressed the second Pradista government: president Manuel Prado y Ugarteche himself, Haya de la Torre, Manuel A. Odría, Pedro Beltrán, Eudocio Ravines and Julio de la Piedra. It was, therefore, "a regime to which the Peruvian Aprista Party has supported with proven loyalty and determination."

Haya and his party —in its early days clearly anti-oligarchic— thus sustained a clearly oligarchic regime, probably with the hope of coming to power by legal means and already exercising them, to make the appropriate reforms. Years later, consulted by Julio Cotler on the matter, Haya replied that "he had misjudged the situation and thought that the oligarchy had more strength than it really had."

== Final presidential bids and First Presidency of Fernando Belaúnde ==
=== 1962 presidential election ===
In the 1962 general elections, Haya returned to Peru to launch his second presidential bid with the Peruvian Aprista Party nomination under "Democratic Alliance", which grouped his party with the Pradista Democratic Movement – which represented the largest sectors of power economic-. Haya obtained 33% of the popular vote, compared to the 32% for newcomer Fernando Belaúnde of the reformist Popular Action and 29% for former president Manuel A. Odría of the Odriist National Union.

As he did not obtain the necessary percentage to be proclaimed president, the election was to be decided by Congress to be installed on July 28, as established by the 1933 Constitution. Apparently, the Peruvian Armed Forces feared that Haya would come to power and they went to the Palace to report their disappointment; informed of this by president Prado, Haya would have tried to make an alliance with Fernando Belaúnde but they reached a standstill, with which he could only consolidate one with Manuel A. Odría, for which he would yield the Aprista votes to him. The Armed Forces denounced fraud in ten departments and also spoke against the virtual president Odría (and not against Haya, according to the position of the historian Percy Cayo Córdoba). Finally, on July 18, the first institutional coup of the Armed Forces took place, led by General Ricardo Pérez Godoy, who overthrew the government of Manuel Prado Ugarteche, thus declaring the elections void and installed a military junta. The coup would also be backed by Popular Action.

=== 1963 presidential election ===
In 1963, the Military Junta led by Nicolás Lindley López convened new elections for June of that year. The three main presidential nominees from the void 1962 election took over the polls once again. Haya was nominated for a third time to presidency with the Peruvian Aprista Party, while Fernando Belaúnde ran in coalition with Popular Action and the Christian Democrat Party, the latter led by Héctor Cornejo Chávez.

The exit polls gave a sound victory for Fernando Belaúnde with 36% of the popular vote, while Haya attained 33%, placing second. The outcome would propel the alliance between Haya and Manuel A. Odría in Congress with the Peruvian Aprista Party and the Odriist National Union.

=== APRA-UNO Coalition (1963–1968) ===
During the years of the Belaúnde administration, Haya and his party remained in opposition alongside Manuel Odría, forming the APRA-UNO coalition, which by number controlled both houses of Congress and strongly opposed Popular Action. They opposed the measures proposed by the government, causing the first agrarian reform law to have a minimum scope: Congress declared the 'efficient' farms dedicated to export crops unaffected, decided that the damages in the backward areas were supervised by a legislative office, and systematically cut the resources destined to the government bonds of payment for the expropriations; the first Agrarian Reform only expropriated 3% of the expropriable land, and benefited only 13,500 families. Likewise, the coalition censored six cabinets ministers of the Fernando Belaúnde administration, including the entire cabinet presided by Julio Óscar Trelles Montes.

== Later life and Constituent Assembly ==
=== Armed Forces Revolutionary Government ===
After the establishment of the military government of Juan Velasco Alvarado, the political parties – the Peruvian Aprista Party among them – were banned and their popular bases persecuted. However, in 1970, on Fraternity Day, Haya claimed the intellectual paternity of the reforms carried out by the military, protesting that they did not recognize the intellectual debt they owed him: "We must be dissatisfied because it is not the way, quickly and furtively, to carry these ideas forward and to hide them, especially hiding their origin and provenance ".

During this time, Haya established the National Bureau of Conjunctions, a party organ tasked with recruiting the most talented youth of the Peruvian Aprista Party. From this group, future president Alan García would rise as its main representative, alongside Carlos Roca Cáceres and Víctor Polay (the latter defecting from the party and forming the terrorist organization known as the Tupac Amaru Revolutionary Movement in 1982).

=== Constituent Assembly (1978–1979) ===
Haya led the popular pressure exerted against the Francisco Morales-Bermúdez administration for the military to return to their barracks and restore democracy. A Constituent Assembly was ultimately convened on July 28, 1978, after elections on June 18, 1978. The Aprista Party attained 37 seats, including Haya, who was elected with over one million votes nationally. Due for having the highest vote count, he was unanimously elected to preside over the Constituent Assembly on July 28, 1978. In a symbolic act, his salary as president of the Assembly was 1 sol de oro. The same day of the installation of the assembly, Haya marked his clear independence with respect to the military regime:

This Assembly embodies the Constituent Power, and the Constituent Power is the supreme expression of the people as such, and the first Power of the State. This Power does not admit conditions, limitations or parameters; it does not recognize powers above itself because it is the indisputable legitimate fruit of popular sovereignty. On a day like today, 157 years ago, Peru declared its independence based on the general will of the people; on July 28, 1978, based on that same general will of the people, clearly expressed in the June elections, with no other limitations than those that she herself wishes to give herself, she proclaims herself free and autonomous. (...) It is obvious that the search for Harmonies and coincidences that offer a broad consensus to the constitutional text do not mean in any way the abandonment of ideological positions or ideas or programs; moreover, a constituent assembly is a natural arena for the confrontation of positions, a political approach of various paths; a constituent assembly does not legislate for a party or for a sector, but for the entire people. (...) if the defective Constitution of 1933, with an obsolete style and spirit, is the last constitution of the 20th century; what is now dictated should be the first constitution of the 21st century.

The drafting of the new constitution took about a year to complete. Haya was absent in the last months of the Assembly due to his failing health. First Vice President of the Assembly, Luis Alberto Sánchez, took over the presidency pro tempore of the Assembly in Haya's absence. During this period, he was considered a strong contender in the 1980 general election for the presidency.

== Death ==
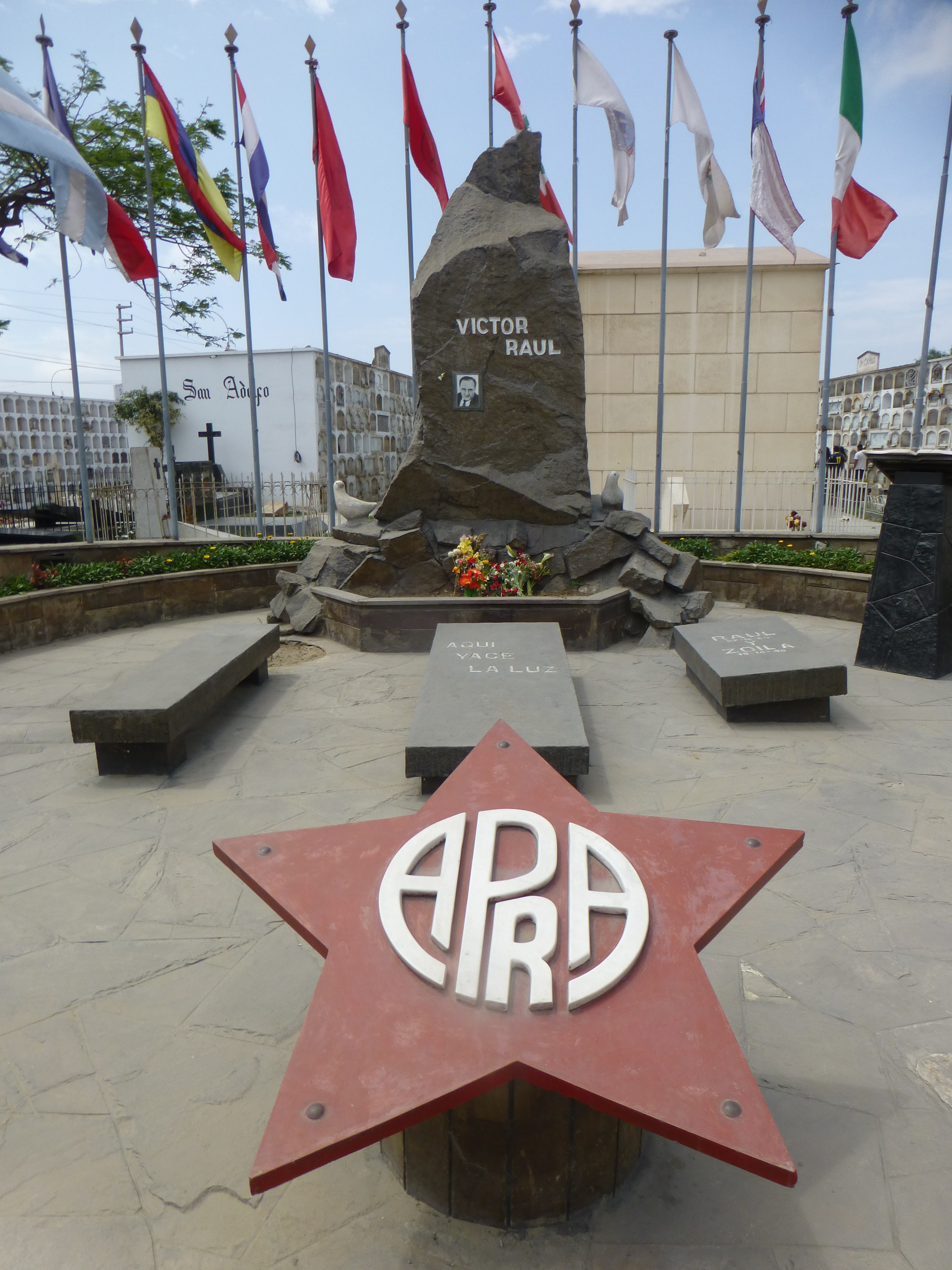
Haya de la Torre tomb in Trujillo, La Libertad.

On July 12, 1979, Haya signed the Constitution on his deathbed. Suffering from lung cancer, Haya died on August 2, 1979, in Mercedes Villa, his home located in the Ate District. On his deathbed he was awarded the Order of the Sun of Peru, in the rank of Grand Cross. At the moment of his death, several party leaders were present, including Luis Alberto Sánchez, Ramiro Prialé, Andrés Townsend, Javier Valle Riestra, Armando Villanueva, Carlos Roca Cáceres and Alan García. Then-president of the United States, Jimmy Carter, sent a letter expressing his condolences to Haya's brother, Edmundo.

His casket was taken to the party headquarters and received by a huge crowd of supporters and followers, who accompanied the transfer of his remains from Lima to his hometown in Trujillo. He was buried in the Miraflores General Cemetery in downtown Trujillo. His coffin rests under a large rock with the phrase "Here lies the light."

The last years of Haya de la Torre's life were spent in his home in Chaclacayo de Villa Mercedes, which became a house of worship for many Peruvians. Later it became known that the house was bought by a drug trafficker, Carlos Langberg, who had financed the Aprista electoral campaign of 1980.

== Legacy ==
Haya de la Torre corresponds to one of the most particular, evolutionary and complex ideological processes in the history of Peru. The set of his writings, pronouncements and positions make him a heterogeneous and even contradictory character, his message has lent itself to different and diverse interpretations. According to general Aprista concepts, Haya applied historical materialism to the revision of the history and objective conditions of Latin America, deducing from it an original theory of political action to lead these societies towards socialism; on the theoretical level, his thought, although close to Marxism at first, will turn out to be different and still contrary to Leninism regarding socialist strategy in colonial or peripheral societies.

Haya postulates that imperialism is the highest expression of capitalism, which is, in turn, the mode of economic production superior to everything the world knew. By virtue of which, he concludes that capitalism is an inevitable phase in the process of contemporary civilization. Capitalism, according to Haya, will not be eternal and has contradictions within itself that will finally end it, but for that to happen, it must evolve completely, that is, exist and mature. He emphasized that the proletariat of the less-developed Latin American countries is too young to make the great revolution that surpasses capitalism.

He goes on to indicate that imperialism is the last phase of capitalism in developed countries, but in underdeveloped countries, such as Peru, it is the first phase. In these countries, it is not a stage of advanced industrialization but rather of exploitation of raw materials, because it is the type of production that the developed world from which the imperialist capitals come from is interested in doing there; not the citizens of these countries. For this reason, he says, its initial development is slow and incomplete. In this way, America's problem is political: how to emancipate yourself from the yoke of imperialism without delaying its progress. As long as it is America and not Europe, as long as it came to capitalism through imperialism, it has to adopt an aptitude for dealing with the problem that is its own.

Haya estimates that it will be the three classes oppressed by imperialism that will advance this stage of society: the young industrial proletariat, the peasantry and the impoverished middle classes. With the alliance of these classes in power, the State will no longer be an instrument of imperialism but a defender of the classes it represents. Thus, they will take from the developed countries what interests them and negotiate with them as equals, not subject, because they need each other. Based on this stance, Haya advocated a system of Latin American (or, to use his preferred term, Indo-American) solutions to Latin American problems. He called upon the region to reject both U.S. imperialism and Soviet communism. With an Americanist vision of doing politics, he believed in what he called "Indoamerica" had to be integrated and fight together to advance. That is why his party has a name that includes the concept of an American alliance. In short, he says that the anti-imperialist resistance in America must be created and given a form of a political organization. This is what Haya considers APRA to be.

Currently, the reinterpretations and analysis of "Hayism" from inside and outside the Peruvian Aprista Party are increasing. Obviously, the most outstanding recent work on the matter corresponds to the authorship of Haya's successor and former president, Alan García. García published The Constructive Revolution of Aprismo: Theory and Practice of Modernity (Lima, 2008); the work outlines an ideological history of the APRA with a view to explaining the current perspective of Aprismo of his time and its governmental expression. The work aims to show a concurrent Haya with a process of intellectual and political maturation; he further explains that during the period 1970–1990, the Apra "turned out to be more ideologically propelled by Juan Velasco Alvarado's legacy than Hayist." García says that his party made a mistake in interpreting the military revolution as the "accomplishment of what the APRA had proposed since 1931. "which would have led them to" adopt as their own nationalizations, the collectivist model in agriculture and the state management of trade in many services and goods ", which were concepts" totally alien to the ideology of Haya and his work dialectically". García's thesis has been contested, or at least disputed, by various Peruvian historians, such as Hugo Neira, Sinesio López, Nelson Manrique and Martín Tanaka.

== Personal life ==
The lack of love interests in Haya de la Torre's life was sometimes remarked upon. Haya de la Torre once stated to APRA members: El APRA es mi mujer y ustedes son mis hijos ("The Apra is my wife and you [the members] are my children"). However, rumours of homosexuality were scattered around the country during and after his life by his political enemies, generally in a crudely homophobic fashion.

Haya de la Torre clearly liked the company of young men. André Coyne, a well-respected French literary critic who happened to be both a good friend of Haya's and the loyal lover and supporter of the Peruvian expatriate poet César Moro, states that Haya sometimes went to "bares de muchachos" (literally "young men's bars") with him, but that he doesn't know whether Haya "ejercía" (i.e., practiced homosexuality). Some personal letters from a close European male friend have also been interpreted as indicating a romantic partnership. In the end, Haya has never been found to have had any sexual partners of either gender. His supporters have sometimes claimed he had female lovers.

There have been claims that Haya de la Torre secretly married his close friend and sympathizer Ana Billinghurst (daughter of former president Guillermo Billinghurst) in 1923, but they seem to have been shown to be unfounded. In the 1950s the APRA leader was forced into asylum by General Odria at the Colombian Embassy in Lima. Ana Billinghurst died while he was under diplomatic protection and he was unable to attend her funeral.

== Published works ==
Haya de la Torre was the author of several works on the Aprista ideology, Peruvian and Latin American affairs. Most of them may be found in the National Library of Peru. His published works include the following:

- 1923 Dos cartas de Haya de la Torre
- 1927 Por la emancipación de América Latina
- 1928 El anti-imperialismo y el APRA
- 1930 Ideario y acción aprista
- 1931 Teoría y táctica del aprismo
- 1932 Impresiones de la Inglaterra imperialista y la Rusia soviética
- 1932 El plan del aprismo
- 1932 Construyendo el aprismo
- 1933 Política aprista
- 1935 ¿A dónde va Indoamérica?
- 1936 Ex-combatientes y desocupados
- 1940 La verdad del aprismo
- 1942 La defensa continental
- 1946 Cartas a los prisioneros apristas
- 1946 ¿Y después de la guerra, qué?
- 1948 Espacio-tiempo-histórico
- 1956 Treinta años de aprismo
- 1956 Mensaje de la Europa nórdica
- 1957 Toynbee frente a los problemas de la Historia

== See also ==
- Asylum (Colombia/Peru)
- Politics of Peru
- List of presidents of Peru

== Bibliography ==
- Robert J. Alexander, "Víctor Raúl Haya de la Torre and 'Indo-America,'" in Prophets of the Revolution: Profiles of Latin American Leaders (New York: Macmillan Company, 1962), 75–108.
- Germán Arciniegas, "The Military vs. Aprismo in Peru," in The State of Latin America (New York: Knopf, 1952), 79–94.
- John A. Mackay, "The APRA Movement," in The Meaning of Life: Christian Truth and Social Change in Latin America ( Eugene, OR: Wipf and Stock, 2014), 177–186.
- John A. Mackay, The Other Spanish Christ (New York: Macmillan, 1932), 193–198.
- Paul E. Sigmund, ed., Models of Political Change in Latin America (New York: Praeger, 1970), 180–187.
- "Víctor Haya de la Torre Is Dead; Elder Statesman of Peru Was 84," Obituary (AP), New York Times, August 4, 1979, 24.

Preceded by None	Leader of the Peruvian Aprista Party; 1930–1979	Succeeded by Armando Villanueva
