= Socialist Party of Peru (1930) =

Socialist Party of Peru (in Spanish: Partido Socialista del Perú) was a political party in Peru. It was founded in 1930 by Luciano Castillo Colonna, through a split in the Peruvian Communist Party. The party dissolved in 1995.
