= Luciano Castillo Colonna =

Peruvian politician (1899–1981)

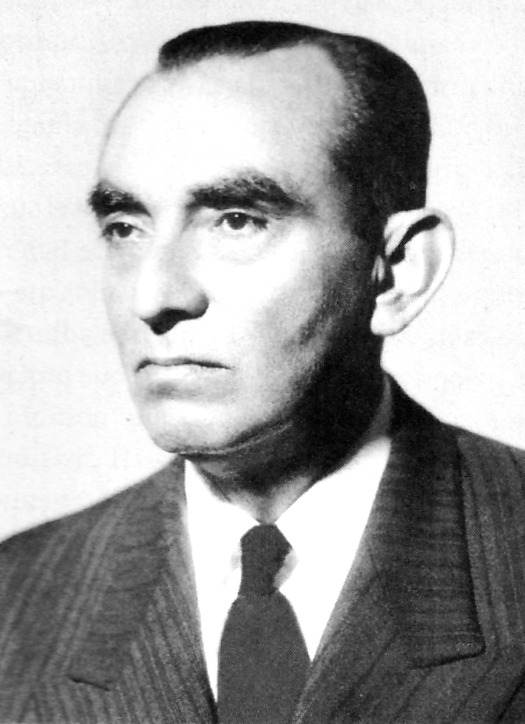
- Born: February 23, 1899
- Died: December 13, 1981 (aged 82)
- Education: National University of Trujillo; National University of San Marcos
- Employer(s): National Autonomous University of Mexico (Professor); National University of Trujillo (Professor)

Luciano Castillo Colonna (23 February 1899 – 13 December 1981) was a Peruvian politician. From 1930 to his death he served as leader of the Socialist Party of Peru. Colonna served in both the upper and lower chambers of Peru's congress. He also ran for president in 1962 and 1980.

He was one of the primary forces behind the creation of the Universidad Nacional de Piura.
