= Nicolás Lindley López =

Peruvian military commander

Nicolás Lindley López LOM, OSP
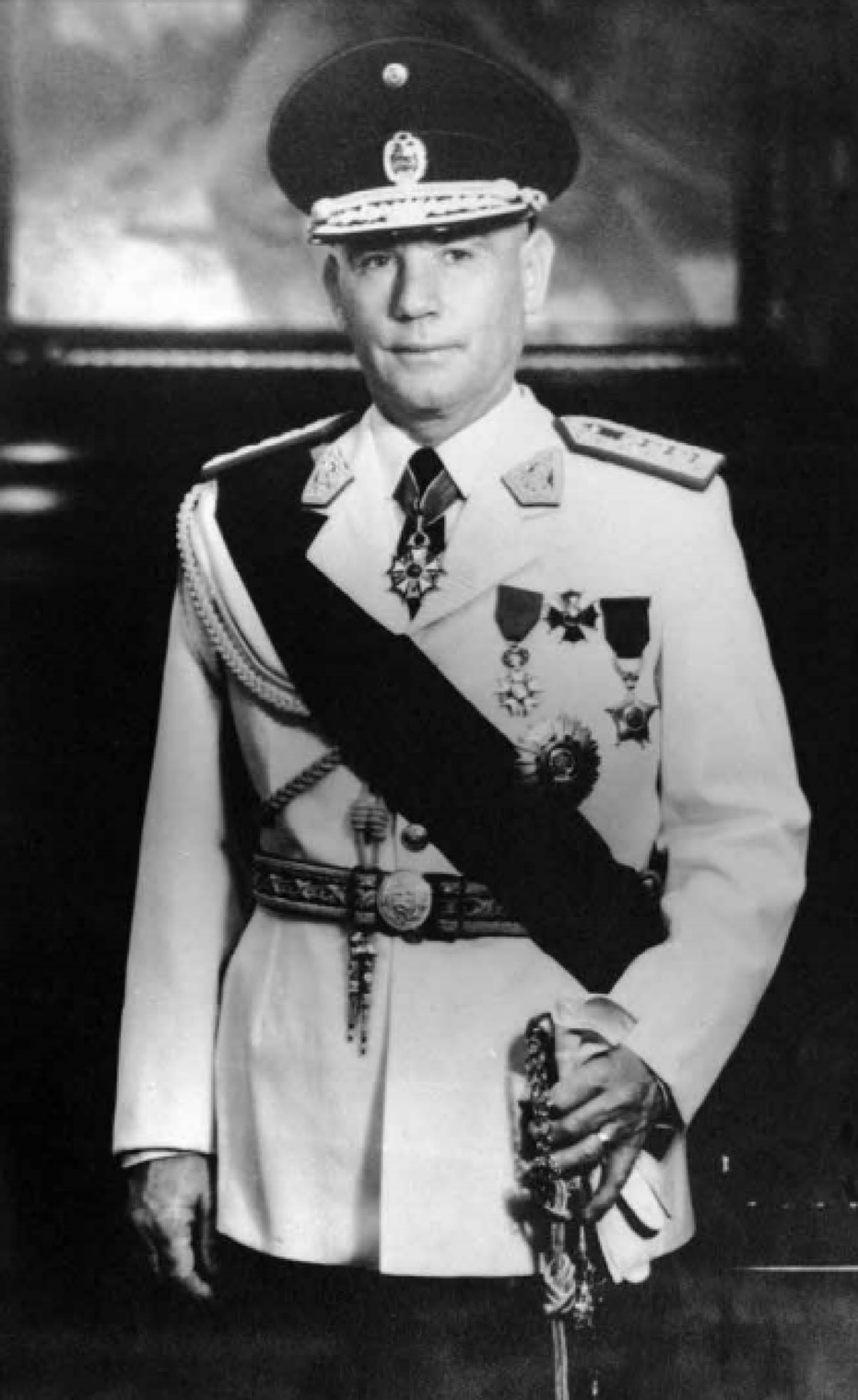

President of Peru
- In office March 3, 1963 – July 28, 1963
- Preceded by: Ricardo Pérez Godoy
- Succeeded by: Fernando Belaúnde (Constitutional President)

Prime Minister of Peru
- In office July 18, 1962 – July 28, 1963
- President: Nicolás Lindley López
- Preceded by: Carlos Moreyra y Paz Soldán
- Succeeded by: Óscar Trelles Montes

Personal details
- Born: November 16, 1908 Lima, Peru
- Died: February 3, 1995 (aged 86) Lima, Peru
- Spouse: María Álvarez del Villar
- Profession: Military officer

Nicolás Eduardo Lindley López (November 16, 1908 – May 3, 1995) was a Peruvian military commander, who headed the military junta in Peru for several months in 1963. He also served as the 48th President of Peru (2nd President of the Military Junta).

== Biography ==
Lindley was born in Lima in 1908 to an upper-class family of English descent, and he studied at the Anglo-Peruvian School (Colegio San Andrés). In 1926, he entered the Chorrillos Military School, where he obtained his doctorate in 1930. Lindley had a successful career within the military, and in 1960 he became general commander of the Peruvian Army.

In October 1961, he was awarded the title of Commander of the Legion of Merit by United States Secretary of Defense, Robert McNamara, for "outstanding professional competence, consistent support of democratic principles, and sincere and imaginative cooperation with military representatives of the Department of the Army."

=== Military junta ===
On July 18 1962, Lindley launched a military coup together with Ricardo Pérez Godoy against the democratically elected President of Peru Manuel Prado, in order to prevent the election of Manuel A. Odría as president by Congress on July 28, 1962, based on his agreement between Víctor Raúl Haya de la Torre, who placed first in the election. The commanders installed a military government, initially headed by Pérez with Lindley as the minister of defense. The United States initially condemned the move beside eight other countries, reversing its position once the government demonstrated control over state functions.

The junta's main goal was to organize new elections and transfer power to a newly elected government. When Pérez showed an inclination to stay in power for longer than originally foreseen, he was overthrown by Lindley on March 3, 1963. Lindley stayed in power until July 28 that year when the election winner Fernando Belaúnde took over the presidency.

=== Post-junta life ===
From 1964 to 1975, Lindley served as the Peruvian ambassador to Spain. He then retired from politics and military life, and later returned to Peru, where he lived until his death at the age of 86.

== Awards and honors ==
Awards and orders	Country	Date	Notes
Commander of the Legion of Merit	United States	31 October 1961	
Grand Master of the Order of the Sun of Peru	Peru	1963	

Military offices
Preceded by Gral. Alejandro Cuadra Rabines	Commander-in-Chief of the Army; August 1960 – July 1962	Succeeded by Gral. Julio Luna Ferrecio
Political offices
Preceded by Carlos Moreyra y Paz Soldán	Prime Minister of Peru; July 18, 1962 – July 28, 1963	Succeeded by Julio Óscar Trelles Montes
Preceded by Ricardo Pérez Godoy	President of Peru (2nd President of the Military Junta); March 3, 1963 – July 28, 1963	Succeeded by Fernando Belaúnde
Diplomatic posts
Preceded by	Peruvian Ambassador to Spain; 1964 – 1975	Succeeded by
