= Pedro Beltrán Espantoso =

Peruvian journalist, economist, and politician

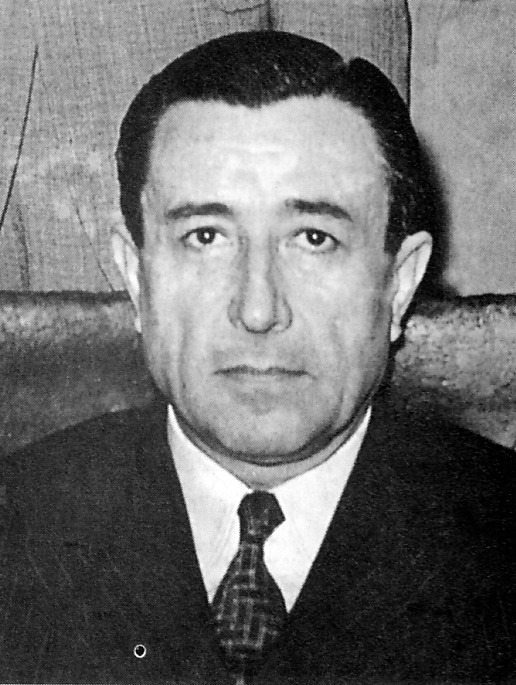
Pedro Beltrán, c. 1938

Pedro Gerardo María Beltrán Espantoso (17 February 1897 – 16 February 1979), was a Peruvian journalist, economist and politician. From 1959 to 1961, he was the Prime Minister and Minister of Finance under Manuel Prado Ugarteche.

Beltrán was a longtime owner and publisher of La Prensa.

Beltrán was the Peruvian Ambassador to the United States from 1944 to 1945. He became president of the Central Reserve Bank in 1948 and served until 1950.

Political offices
Preceded by Luis Gallo Porras	Prime Minister of Peru; 18 July 1959 – 24 November 1961	Succeeded by Carlos Moreyra y Paz Soldán
