= Ricardo Pérez Godoy =

Peruvian army general, junta head, President

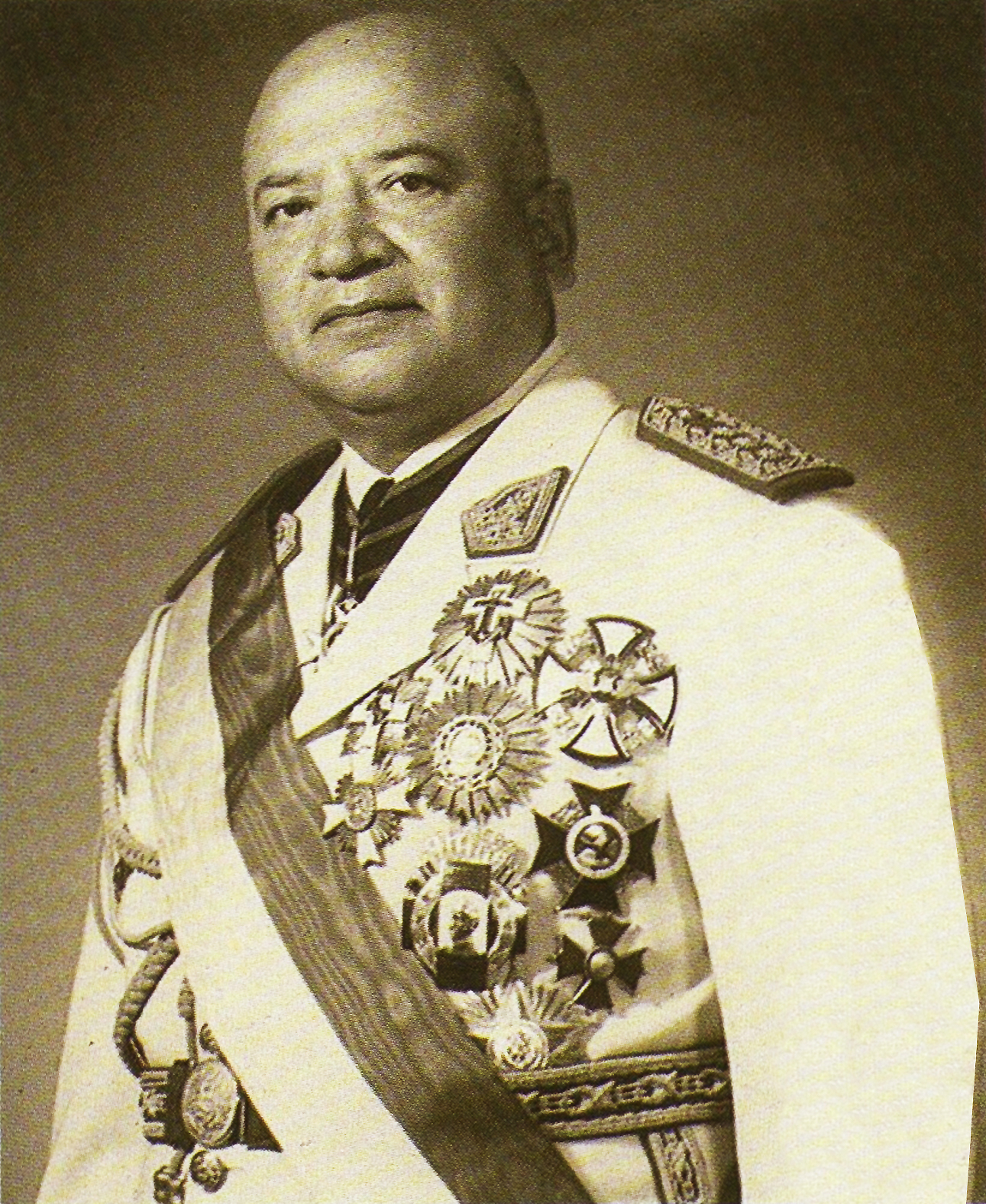

President of the Military Junta of Peru
- In office 19 July 1962 – 3 March 1963
- Prime Minister: Nicolás Lindley López
- Preceded by: Manuel Prado Ugarteche
- Succeeded by: Nicolás Lindley López

Personal details
- Born: 9 June 1905 Lima, Peru
- Died: 26 July 1982 (aged 77) Lima, Peru
- Profession: Military officer

Military service
- Allegiance: Peru
- Branch/service: Peruvian Army
- Rank: General

Ricardo Pío Pérez Godoy (9 June 1905 – 26 July 1982) was a general of the Peruvian army who launched a coup d'état in July 1962, headed a military junta until March 1963 and served as the 47th President of Peru (1st President of the Military Junta).

== Military Junta ==
Three main candidates participated in the Peruvian presidential elections of 10 June 1962: Víctor Raúl Haya de la Torre, founder and leader of the APRA, future president Fernando Belaúnde, and former dictator Manuel A. Odría. Haya de la Torre gained most of the votes according to the official results, one percentage point ahead of Belaúnde.

However, none of the candidates reached the margin of one-third of the votes needed to become president. Therefore, the final decision lay with the Peruvian Congress. Haya de la Torre and Odría formed an alliance in order to install Odría as the new president.

At 3:20 in the morning of 18 July 1962 at the Presidential Palace, one of the thirty tanks stationed outside gunned its engine and rammed through the black wrought-iron gates. Manuel Prado, the constitutional President of Peru, was thrown out of office in a coup, just ten days short of completing his six-year term.

Pérez Godoy, as Chairman of the Joint Chiefs of Staff, headed the military junta formed by high-ranked members of the Peruvian Military Force: General Nicolás Lindley, commander of Peru's army; Vice Admiral Juan Francisco Torres Matos, Admiral of the Navy; and General Pedro Vargas Prada, chief of the air force. Once in the Palace, the four-man junta administered its own swearing-into office. The soldiers then suspended all constitutional guarantees, dissolved Parliament, arrested Electoral Tribunal officials "for trial" and promised "clean and pure elections" scheduled for June 9, 1963. Lindley was subsequently named Prime Minister.

The military coup was condemned throughout the world: the initial reaction abroad was of disgust and dismay, something the military junta had not expected. Nine Latin American countries suspended or broke off diplomatic relations. The United States resumed diplomatic links with the new government after several months.

According to one observer, Godoy was “a soldier of progressive views who was convinced that the army could do a better job than the politicians in tackling the problems with which the country was faced.” Under Godoy, cabinet positions were given to progressive officers while a National Planning Institute was set up to plan for social reform as well as economic development. Promising a "New Peru", Pérez Godoy pushed through a 24% increase in the budget and decreed new taxes to pay for it, including a one dollar-a-ton levy on anchovies that provoked a strike and threatened to close down the thriving fishmeal industry. And when he refused to approve the construction of a new hospital for Vargas Prada's Air Force and six new ships for Torres Matos' national steamship line, the other junta members turned on him.

Politically, Pérez Godoy was generally in favor of carrying out the promised June elections even if they should result in a victory for the leftist-turned-moderate APRA Party of Víctor Raúl Haya de la Torre. However, in early 1963, he showed more of an inclination to deviate from the original plan and to stay in power longer than initially planned.

=== Overthrow ===
Warned that his comrades-in-arms were determined to remove him, Pérez Godoy tried to no avail to rally support among provincial military commanders and civilians working toward the new presidential elections in June.

Air Force Major General Pedro Vargas Prada and Vice Admiral Francisco Torres Matos gave him an ultimatum: resign or be driven out. Pérez Godoy replied: "I refuse to leave. It is too late now to continue this conversation. I am going to retire."

He was deposed by the junta's next man in line, Army General Nicolás Lindley, who swiftly moved into the presidency on March 3. Lindley restored the schedule for democratic elections and turned over the office of president to election winner Fernando Belaúnde.

Military offices
Preceded by Gral. Héctor Bejarano Vallejo	Chairman of the Joint Chiefs of Staff; 1961 – 1962	Succeeded by Gral. Luis Llosa Gonzales Pavón
Political offices
Preceded by Manuel Prado	President of Peru (1st President of the Military Junta); July 1962 – March 1963	Succeeded by Nicolás Lindley
