= Peruvian Democratic Movement =

Peruvian Democratic Movement Movimiento Democrático Peruano
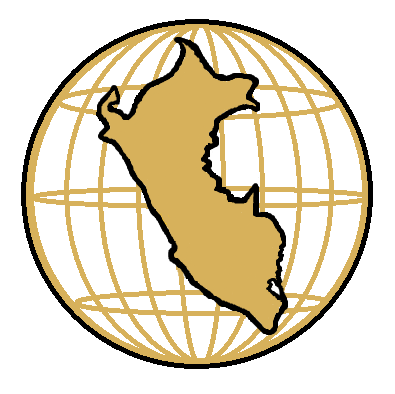
- Leader: Manuel Prado Ugarteche
- Founder: Manuel Cisneros Sánchez
- Founded: 1956
- Dissolved: 1981
- Headquarters: Lima, Peru
- Ideology: Conservative liberalism Populism
- Political position: Centre-right

Peruvian Democratic Movement (Spanish: Movimiento Democrático Peruano, MDP), originally named Pradist Democratic Movement (Spanish: Movimiento Democrático Pradista, MDP), was a political party in Peru in 1956. The founder of the party was Manuel Cisneros Sánchez. Manuel Prado y Ugarteche was the leader of the party, and was elected president in 1956. Later, MDP took the name Movimiento Democrático Peruano. It governed Peru between 1956 and 1962. In the 1962 election, the party supported the candidacy of American Popular Revolutionary Alliance candidate Víctor Raúl Haya de la Torre.

== Social Base ==
The members of the Prado Democratic Movement came from powerful economic sectors such as the large landowners of northern Peru, banking, industry, and companies linked to transnational groups. Some of its leaders also held diplomatic posts. For example, Manuel Cisneros Sánchez was ambassador to Spain and Javier Ortiz de Zevallos to Panama . The latter was also a member of the Constituent Assembly, First Vice President, and senator, in all cases representing the Peruvian Democratic Movement. The support of Carlos Miró Quesada was also important. He was not a member of the party, but he did support Prado's presidential candidacy through the newspaper El Comercio and was a leading figure of conservatism and anti-APRA sentiment at the time.
