= Progressive Social Movement =

Progressive Social Movement (in Spanish: Movimiento Social Progresista) was a political party in Peru founded in 1956. Its leaders included Santiago Agurto Calvo (general secretary), Alberto Ruiz Eldredge and the Salazar Bondy brothers.

== Development ==
Peru went through political upheaval in 1956 when long-serving dictator Manuel A. Odría announced plans for democratic elections, resulting in a raft of political parties, some transient in nature, springing up. Those behind the formation of the MSP had initially been part of one of these groups Popular Action, but split almost immediately to form their own party. They sought support amongst urban professionals by professing an agenda that supported scientific advancement and technocracy as the cures for Peru's ills.

The MSP contested the 1962 elections, presenting Alberto Ruiz Eldredge as their presidential candidate, but struggled for support due to the similarity of their programme to that of Popular Action and their lack of a charismatic leader in the mould of Fernando Belaúnde Terry. Many of their pro-science and technology positions had been co-opted by Belaúnde as the founding ideology of Popular Action.

Torn between two wings, one sympathetic to the Cuban revolution and the other prepared to work with the new Belaúnde government, the MSP disappeared from the political scene soon after the 1962 elections as its leading members drifted to other groups including both Popular Action and opposition groups to the left. The 1968 coup that brought leftist General Juan Velasco Alvarado to power saw a number of MSP leaders return to influence even though the party had long disappeared by then.

== Bibliography ==
- Hugo Neira, "Peru" in JP Bernard et al., Guide to the Political Parties of South America, Harmondsworth: Penguin, 1973
