= Héctor Cornejo Chávez =

Peruvian politician, jurist and writer

Hector Cornejo Chavez (November 15, 1918 in Arequipa – July 11, 2012 in Lima) was a Peruvian politician, jurist and writer. He was also an attorney, family law expert, and founder of the Christian Democrat Party in Peru.

== See also ==
- Luis Bedoya Reyes

== Bibliography ==
- Hugo Neira, "Peru" in JP Bernard et al., Guide to the Political Parties of South America, Harmondsworth: Penguin, 1973
