= Odriist National Union =

Odriist National Union Unión Nacional Odriista
- Leader: Manuel A. Odría
- General Secretary: Napoleón Tello
- Founded: 1961
- Dissolved: 1968 (original party)
- Ideology: Personalismo; Right-wing socialism Authoritarian populism Authoritarian conservatism Authoritarian capitalism Social justice Political Catholicism; Anti-democracy
- Political position: Right-wing to far-right
- Religion: Catholic Church

The Odriist National Union (Spanish: Unión Nacional Odriista or UNO), was a political party in Peru founded in 1961 by former President General Manuel A. Odría. The party had Julio de la Piedra amongst its leaders.

== Development ==
The party had its origins in Odría's military regime, which ended in 1956 when he left the country. Odría's popularity grew after he left office, largely due to the high level of public works that his administration had brought in. His spending policies, however, had left a high level of public debt and it fell to the government of Manuel Prado Ugarteche to cope with this. The result was the creation of a myth that Odría's rule had been one of prosperity in contrast to Prado's (although much of the problems were due to a fall in demand for raw materials following the end of the Korean War). As a consequence Odría was able to return and set up UNO in 1961, and the party quickly became the country's third biggest behind American Popular Revolutionary Alliance and Popular Action.

Although dominated by its leader the party did have a wider structure which included a national executive, a consultative committee and a series of locally based shop and area committees. Julio de la Piedra was the leading figure behind Odría, serving as chairman of the party as well as their leader in the Chamber of Deputies.

== Support ==
In elections support for the UNO came mainly from three sources. These were:

- Inhabitants of the barriadas particularly in Lima where Odría topped the polls in the annulled 1962 Peruvian general election. He scored highly even in traditionally left wing areas of the city such as La Victoria.
- UNO generally came off third best in the country's regions except in the Piura Region, the Tacna Region and the Callao Region. These areas had been main beneficiaries of investment schemes during Odría's rule (notably irrigation schemes) and as such his support held up.
- Supporters of the Partido Restaurador del Peru, the name given to the official party of state that Odría had set up in 1948. This included key people he had placed in the trade unions and middle class groups, as well as people from poor backgrounds who had been given jobs and health care by his government.

== Programme ==
The party represented the far right of politics in Peru. However whilst it had some highly conservative principles, notably to do with the special status of the Roman Catholic Church and investment capitalism, it followed the line of the main parties with regards to development and social justice. Napoleón Tello, the general secretary of the UNO, described the party's ideology as "right-wing socialism". The party was critical of democracy and espoused authoritarianism, feeling that the competitive party system led to inefficiency and stopped important decisions from being made. Above all however, the driving force behind the UNO was the cult of personality built up around Odría and the achievements of his government.

== Disappearance and return ==
The 1968 coup which saw Juan Velasco Alvarado brought to power also saw UNO disappear from the political scene. De la Piedra meanwhile broke away, and formed his Nationalist Social Democrat Party the same year.

The UNO name was revived first in the 1989 Lima mayoral election when they put up Italian-born panettone entrepreneur Angelo Rovegno for mayor of Lima; he and others lost to Ricardo Belmont Cassinelli. In the subsequent 1990 Peruvian presidential election, lawyer Dora Narrea de Castillo ran under the party name, being the first woman ever to run for President of Peru. However, by this time Odría was long dead and his government a distant memory and so only 0.3% of the vote was secured in an election which brought Alberto Fujimori to power. Enrique Odría Sotomayor, his nephew, has registered "Alternancia Perú UNO" as a political party.

== Bibliography ==
- Hugo Neira, "Peru" in JP Bernard et al., Guide to the Political Parties of South America, Harmondsworth: Penguin, 1973
- Cobas Corrales, Efraín (August 2014). "Las elecciones y el golpe de estado de 1962". Revista de Sociología (24). Lima: Universidad Nacional Mayor de San Marcos: 317–402. ISSN 1605-8933.
