= Manuel Prado Ugarteche =

President of Peru 1939–1945, 1956–1962

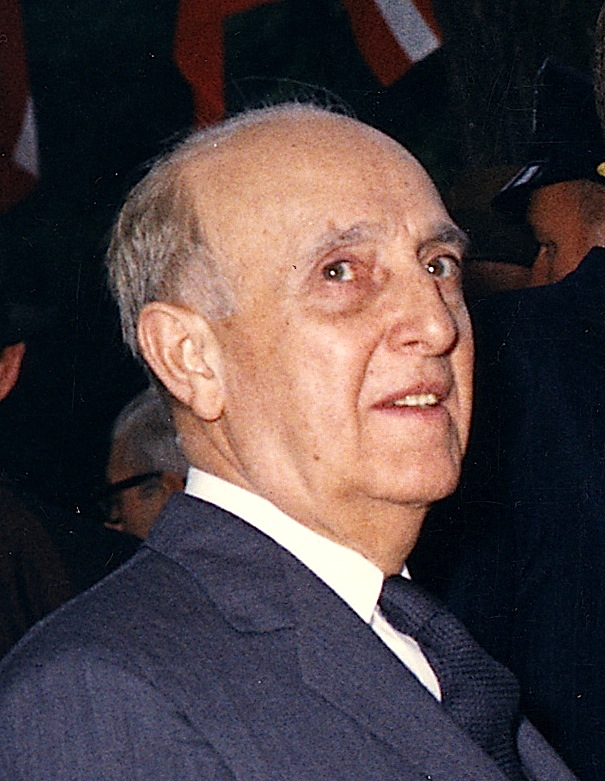
- Ugarteche in 1961

President of Peru
- In office 28 July 1956 – 18 July 1962
- Prime Minister: Manuel Cisneros Sánchez; Luis Gallo Porras; Pedro Beltrán Espantoso; Carlos Moreyra y Paz Soldán
- Vice President: Luis Gallo Porras; Carlos Moreyra y Paz Soldán
- Preceded by: Manuel A. Odría
- Succeeded by: Ricardo Pérez Godoy
- In office 8 December 1939 – 28 July 1945
- Prime Minister: Alfredo Solf y Muro; Manuel Cisneros Sánchez
- Vice President: Rafael Larco Herrera; Carlos D. Gibson
- Preceded by: Oscar R. Benavides
- Succeeded by: José Bustamante y Rivero

Personal details
- Born: 21 April 1889 Lima, Peru
- Died: 15 August 1967 (aged 78) Paris, France
- Cause of death: Myocardial infarction
- Party: Pradist Democratic Movement
- Spouse(s): Enriqueta Garland Higginson; Clorinda Málaga de Prado
- Children: 2
- Parent(s): Mariano Ignacio Prado; María Magdalena Ugarteche Gutiérrez de Cossío
- Profession: Banker

Manuel Carlos Prado y Ugarteche (21 April 1889 – 15 August 1967) was a Peruvian politician and banker who served twice as president of Peru, in 1939–1945 and 1956–1962. Son of former President Mariano Ignacio Prado, his brother, Leoncio Prado Gutiérrez, was a soldier who died in 1883, six years before Manuel Prado was born.

Prado was born in Lima in 1889 as the son of Mariano Ignacio Prado. He went to college and became a banker. In 1914, Prado, along with General Benavides, overthrew Guillermo Billinghurst and his government during the First World War, in which Peru remained neutral. Benavides became the president of the Junta. Later imprisoned, Prado was deported to Chile and went into exile in France. He returned in 1932, and upon his return he was chairman of the board of the Peruvian Vapores Company and general manager and president of the Central Reserve Bank of Peru, which he served from 1934 to 1939. He ran and won the 1939 elections. Under his first administration, Peru came out victorious against Ecuador in the Ecuadorian-Peruvian War, and also became the first country in South America to break relations with the Axis, as Peru declared war on the Axis. After the end of his administration in 1945, he went to Paris, and eventually came back. He defeated Belaunde in the elections in 1956, as his second administration came to power. He sided with the United States in the Cold War, but was deposed in a coup, led by Ricardo Perez Godoy in 1962. He went into exile for one last time to Paris, where he died in 1967.

== Early life ==
Born into a prominent political family, he was the youngest son of General Mariano Ignacio Prado and his wife, María Magdalena Ugarteche Gutiérrez de Cossío. His father was various times head of government of Peru and was President of the Republic when the war with Chile broke out in 1879. He left the country in the midst of the war and was later deposed by a coup d'état.

Prado had several siblings who distinguished themselves in politics, finances and diplomacy. His paternal half-brother Leoncio was a war hero who died executed by the Chileans in 1883. His eldest brother Mariano Ignacio was a prominent banker who founded the so-called Prado Empire, the main economic group in Peru during the first half of 20th Century. Other brothers included Javier, once Prime Minister and intellectual figure, and Jorge, also a Prime Minister.

Manuel studied at Lycée Saint-Louis-de-Gonzague, in Paris, and Inmaculada School in Lima. He then attended the faculties of Sciences and Political Sciences of the University of San Marcos, where he received a bachelor's degree in 1907 and a doctor's degree in 1910. He also studied at the National School of Engineers (now the National University of Engineering), graduating as a Civil Engineer in 1911.

Elected by both the student bodies of the National School of Engineers and University of San Marcos, he was a student delegate to the 1st Congress of American Students in Montevideo in 1908. As a undergraduate student, he received military education in the Military School of Chorrillos attaining the ranks of sergeant and cavalry ensign. He later joined the army with this commission and was stationed in Lambayeque when a war with Ecuador was imminent in 1911.

Incorporated into San Marcos in 1912, he was assistant professor and then full professor of the infinitesimal Analysis course in the Faculty of Sciences.

== Early political career ==
Joined to the Civil Party, he and his brothers Javier and Jorge supported the civil-military coup d'etat which overthrew President Guillermo Billinghurst in February 1914. The coup was organized by members of both the Civil Party and the Congress who wanted to anticipate the dissolution of the latter by Billinghurst. The Prado brothers took an active role in the capture of the Government Palace and once Billinghurst was arrested urged him to resign. The deposed Billinghurst later said that the Prado brothers stated that they were obliged "to vindicate the name of his father". Manuel Prado was then promoted to lieutenant by the Congress.

In 1915, he was elected member of the Council of the City of Lima. In the Council, he was an inspector of Works and as such designed some of the plans of the urban reordering of the city.

In 1919, Prado was elected a member of the National Assembly called by Augusto Leguía to promulgate a new Constitution. Early that year, Leguía had overthrew the Civilist President Pardo y Barreda and called an assembly to rewrite a Constitution convenient to him. Prado among other Civilists decisively opposed the new regime and despite being elected a senator later was deported by Leguía in 1921. He and his brothers settled down in Paris and London, respectively.

Prado returned to Peru after a military coup overthrew Leguía in 1930. In 1932, he was elected a member of the board of directors of the Central Reserve Bank of Peru and, shortly afterwards, general manager of the Bank. In 1934, he was appointed chairman (Governor) of the Bank, a post he occupied until 1939 with the general manager office.

=== 1939 election ===
For the 1939 general election, President Oscar R. Benavides chose Prado as his presidential candidate. Against this official candidacy, José Quesada Larrea, a young lawyer, a native of Trujillo, Peru, who for his campaign acquired the newspaper La Prensa, from where he fought for electoral freedom, for the obvious purpose of the government to manipulate the results.

The APRA party, which was the most important party in the country, was outlawed. Another important political force, the Sanchecerrista Revolutionary Union, was also annulled when its leader, Luis A. Flores, was banished. At the electoral juncture, both Prado and Quesada requested the support of the apristas (Members and supporters of the APRA) but they decided not to take sides. Prado ran as a candidate for a concentration of small parties.

Before the election, the government shut down La Prensa. When the counts were made, Prado appeared as the victor, with enormous advantage. There was talk of mass fraud

== First government (1939–1945) ==
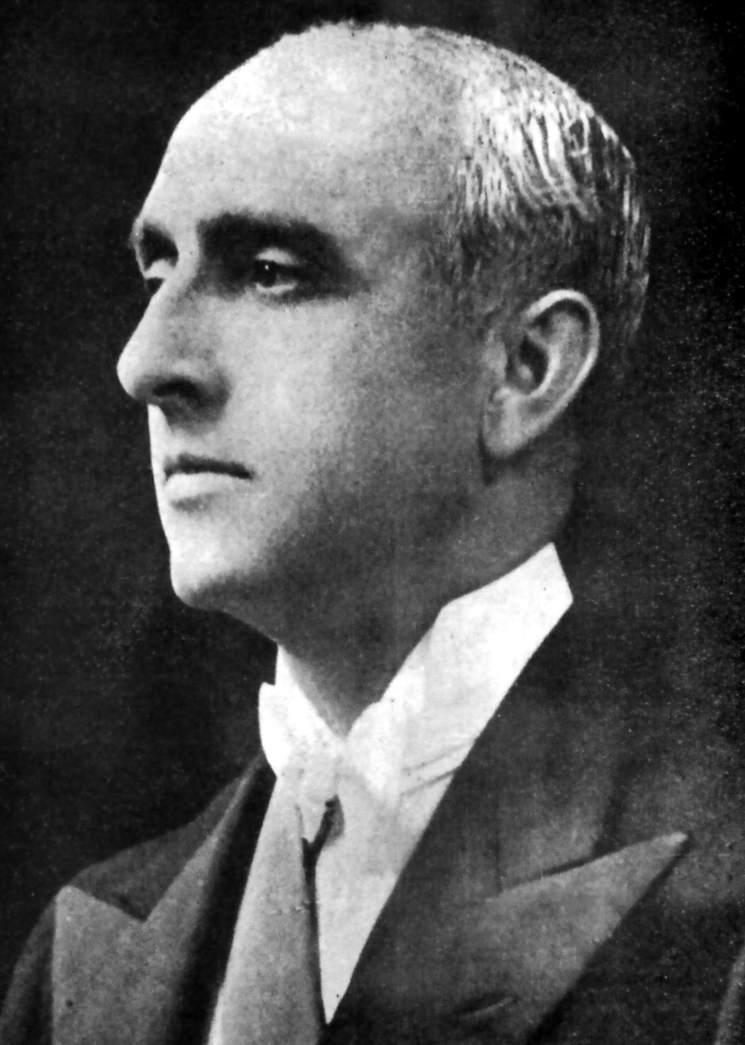
Manuel Prado in 1939

Manuel Prado assumed the presidency on 8 December 1939. Politician until then almost unknown, he predicted that he would not last long in office, but deployed a combination of tactical cunning, strategic flexibility and personal charm that made him one of Peru's most effective politicians of the 20th century. His government largely continued the work done by General Benavides and was of relative democracy. It suffered the consequences of the Second World War, which had a strong impact on trade. Imports fell sharply but export products such as sugar, cotton, metals and rubber increased. The shortage of import products for domestic consumption brought about new industries that successfully replaced foreign products. The war made numerous "new rich" appear.

In the international order, Prado had two notable successes:

The first was the victorious war against Ecuador and the subscription of the Rio de Janeiro Protocol guaranteed by the United States, Brazil, Chile and Argentina, which sought to settle the old boundary lawsuit that for more than a century had kept the attention of the Peruvian chancellery. The problem was revived again some time later, following Ecuador's withdrawal of recognition of the Protocol.

The second was the policy of continental solidarity and support for the United States and democracies faced by the Axis powers, Germany, Italy and Japan, during World War II. Peru was the first country in Latin America to break relations with the Axis powers, and during an extraordinary meeting of chancellors held in Rio de Janeiro in early 1942, it was the Peruvian attitude that inclined representatives of other American countries to support the United States. This pro-Americanism brought with it some excesses, such as allowing the United States to set up an air base in Talara, northern Peru, and the mass internment of German and Japanese residents. In the domestic order, despite being considered a democratic government, Prado kept the Aprista Party outlawed; only in the last year of his government, on the occasion of the general election, did he legalize the participation of APRA, which on that occasion was part of the National Democratic Front under the name "People's Party". In contrast, many communists supported Prado, following the international context, as the Soviet Union belonged to the Allied bloc.

=== Important events ===
In addition to the victorious war against Ecuador, with the subsequent signing of the Rio de Janeiro Protocol, as well as support for Western democracies in World War II, the following works were carried out in Prado's first government:

- An "import substitution" policy was planned in the face of a shortage of imported products because of world war. In this sense, significant progress was made in the country's industrialization process.
- The Peruvian Amazon Corporation was founded to boost the rubber industry, in the face of its demand for world war.
- The Peruvian Commercial Aviation Corporation(CORPAC), responsible for the proper functioning of airports, was created. For this purpose, Limatambo Airport was opened.
- The agreement with the United States for agricultural development was signed through the intervention of the Inter-American Cooperative
- Food Production Service (SCIPA).
- The asphalt of the Peruvian stretch of the Pan American Highway was completed.
- The Central Road to Aguaytia and Pucallpa was completed, in themiddle of the jungle.
- The department of Tumbes (Law No. 9667 of 25 November 1942)and the department of Pasco (Law No. 10.030 of 27 November 1944) were created.
- The 1940 General Census was held, which yielded a population of 6,207,966. Some 577,000 inhabitants were concentrated in Lima.
- The organic Law on Public Education was given accompanied by an aggressive national literacy plan, in the face of the large number of illiterate people that the census unveiled (1943).
- It gave access to technical education, with the best implementation and equipment of art schools and crafts.
- The Worker's Hospital (present-day Guillermo Almenara Hospital) was inaugurated.
- The Worker's Hospital of Huacho (present-day Gustavo Lanatta Luján Hospital) was inaugurated.
- The Maternity Hospital of Lima was inaugurated.
- Mass vaccination campaigns began.
- The fourth Working Quarter was built on the Rimac.
- The Yavarí District was created in the Mariscal Ramón Castilla Province in the Department of Loreto
- The boost to tourism continued.
- Popular canteens were created, which subsisted efficiently for several decades.
- In this period there were two misfortunes of magnitude: the Lima and Callao Earthquake of 24 May 1940, and the fire of the National Library of Peru that occurred on 11 May 1943. The reconstruction of the latter was commissioned by the historian Jorge Basadre.

In the 1945 general election Prado sponsored the candidacy of General Eloy Ureta, the victor in the war against Ecuador in 1941. But the most popular candidacy was that of the jurist José Luis Bustamante y Rivero, representing a front or alliance of parties including the APRA: the National Democratic Front, which proved triumphant.

After his tenure, Prado traveled and settled in Paris where he owned a residence on the elegant Avenida Foch. In Lima, he was the owner of the Edificio Rímac from 1939 to 1945.

=== Position on the Jewish Holocaust ===
Faced with the systematic extermination of millions of Jews in Europe, Manuel Prado Ugarteche, through his Chancellor Alfredo Solf de Muro, implemented a strict policy of denying visas to Jews who asked for entry to Peru, even though they desperately sought to escape certain death.

Very notorious is the case of "the negative response of the Prado government to the request of the "World Jewish Congress" so that Peru, like many countries in the world, would agree to admit Jewish children orphaned by war that were to be maintained and educated on 20 Jews residing in Peru. The Peruvian government, through Chancellor Solf de Muro, refused in 1944 the request to admit 200 Jewish children aged 4 to 10, who later were murdered at Auschwitz.

Another case that exemplifies his position is that of Peruvian diplomat José María Barreto, who worked for the Peruvian embassy in Switzerland during the Holocaust. Barreto was moved by Nazi brutality against the Jews, and decided to issue Peruvian passports to save 58 Jews, including 14 children. The Peruvian chancellery nullified the passports upon learning about this, closed the embassy in Geneva, and fired José María Barreto, ruining his political career.

During Prado's second presidency (1956–1962), the only significant proscribed party was the APRA (American Popular Revolutionary Alliance), which was thrown out of power and outlawed in 1948 by President Manuel Odría. Prado announced that he would submit to the newly elected Congress a bill to legalize APRA once again. The bill was later passed and the APRA's famed founder, Víctor Raúl Haya de la Torre, returned from foreign exile.

=== Foreign policy of first government ===
In foreign policy, Prado – whose greatest pride was that as President in 1942 he made Peru the first of the South American nations to break off relations with the Axis powers– was expected to side firmly with the U.S. There is documentary evidence that shows that Prado's enthusiastic support of the deportation of Peruvians of Japanese descent to the United States during World War II was motivated by a desire to rid Peru of all of its Japanese-descended residents—a charge which some historians have argued amounted to a campaign of ethnic cleansing.

== Second government (1956–1962) ==
Elections were held on 17 June 1956. The official results were as follows: Manuel Prado Ugarteche, 568,134 votes (45.5%); Fernando Belaunde Terry, 457,638 votes (36.7%) and Hernando de Lavalle, 222,323 votes (17.8%).

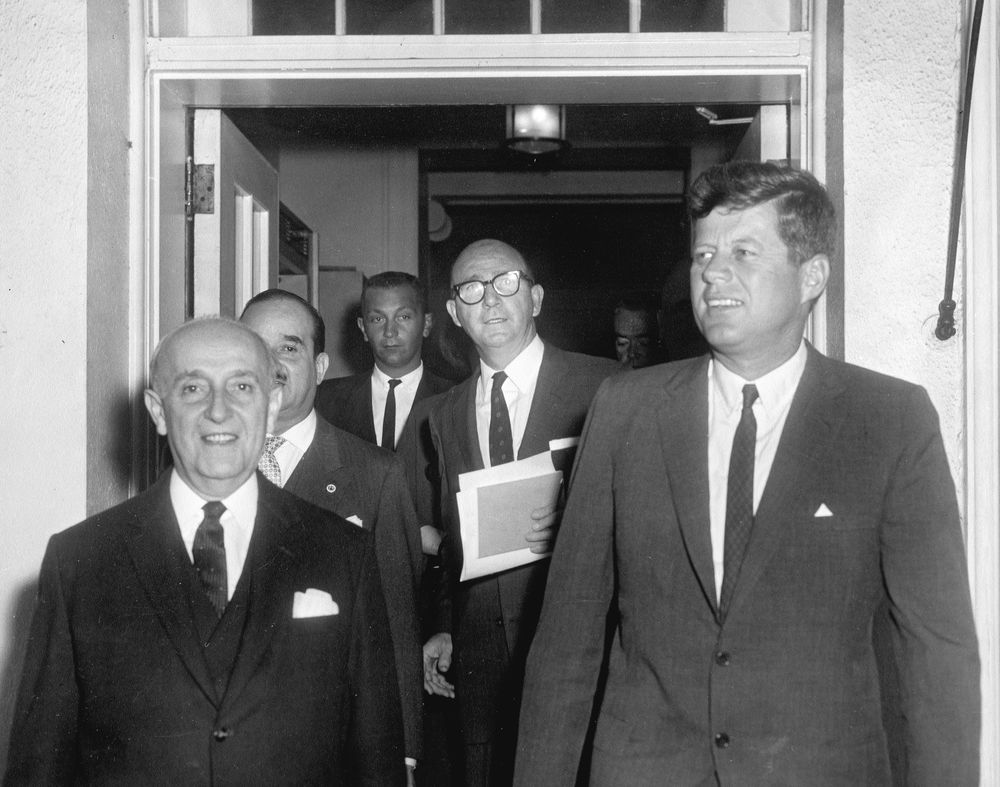
Prado with John F Kennedy in September 1961

During Prado's second presidency (1956–1962), the only significant proscribed party was the APRA (American Popular Revolutionary Alliance), which was thrown out of power and outlawed in 1948 by President Manuel Odría. Prado announced that he would submit to the newly elected Congress a bill to legalize APRA once again. The bill was later passed and the APRA's famed founder, Víctor Raúl Haya de la Torre, returned from foreign exile.

This government developed in a climate of turmoil motivated by the economic crisis that presented itself with increasingly alarming characteristics; because of the turmoil that arose in the countryside in favor of the realization of land reform and a vigorous campaign of national scope for the recovery of the oil fields of La Brea and Pariñas that illegally continued to operate the American company International Petroleum Company. The leadership of the opposition was assumed by the architect Belaunde, who organized a new mass party: People's Action, which was preparing for the next general election, where he would have prominence. The newspapers El Comercio y La Prensa also made opposition, which could not counter La Crónica, a newspaper owned by the Prado family, because it was more oriented to sports and police issues. In the economic order, the biggest problem was budgetary in nature, which had as its origin the recession produced in the United States in 1957. Export products were significantly depreciated and dollars were scarce, so the Peruvian currency was devalued. Pedro G. Beltrán, the director of the newspaper La Prensa, then went on to support the government (1959) was appointed as Minister of Finance and President of the Council of Ministers. The mission was to put finance in order, balance the budget and stabilize the currency, which was achieved, not without first adopting anti-popular measures such as rising gasoline, cutting food subsidies and increasing the tax burden. It was a liberal policy.

In those years the migrations of the mountains developed a lot and the slums around Lima increased, to the point of talking about the "belt of misery" that was beginning to surround the capital. Overall, Prado did not do much to improve the situation and condition of the national majority that continued to live in terrible conditions.

As the end of government approached, popular discontent was undeniable. The strikes were slashed and boisterous and even violent protests were made in the streets. In addition to economic policy, the president's own personality, pompous and frivolous in difficult times, was criticized.

On a personal level, Prado managed in 1958 to get the Catholic Church to annul his marriage to Enriqueta Garland so he could marry the Limeña lady Clorinda Málaga, which caused little scandal among the conservative sector of Limegna society. In 1961 he was the first foreign head of state to visit Japan after World War II.

=== Important works and facts ===
The main facts of this government include:

- The Industrial Promotion Act was given, which promoted the country's still fledgling industrial development.
- The National Fund for Economic Development was created in each department for the execution of public works as a manifestation of administrative decentralization.
- A steel plant was installed in the port of Chimbote, with which the country intended to emulate the industrialization efforts of other Latin American nations. Chimbote was also already the most important fishing port and its explosive growth was one of the most jumping social phenomena of that time.
- He began taking off from the fishmeal industry, until he made Peru the first fishing power on the planet, a credit that was due to the talented Peruvian businessman Luis Banchero Rossi.
- Peru's strong rights defense was made in the face of Ecuador's campaign in America to ignore the Rio de Janeiro Protocol of 1942.
- Faced with the peasant demand for land reform, Prado limited himself to the creation of an Institute of Agrarian Reform and Colonization (IRAC), with the "immediate purpose of studying, proposing and, where possible, implementing the necessary measures to increase the cultivated area by colonizing the forest, spreading small and medium-sized property and preferentially seeking the establishment of family farms", whose studies were resumed by the following governments.
- The new BAP cruisers Almirante Grau and BAP Coronel Bolognesi were acquired and came to replace the first cruisers of similar names that had been acquired 50 years ago, in the first government of José Pardo and Barreda. They would provide services until the early 1980s.
- The creation of the Joint Command of the Armed Forces, an institution that groups the commandos of the three defensive weapons of the Republic: Army, Navy and Aviation.
- The reform of secondary education being divided into Letters and Sciences from the fourth year. Technical secondary education was improved but primary education was neglected.
- Diplomatic relations with Cuba were broken after the triumph of the Communist Revolution and its orientation towards the Soviet bloc.
- Peru's integration into the Alliance for Progress that then-U.S. President John F. Kennedy led to as a means of developing Latin America.
- An agreement was signed with Bolivia for the use of the waters of Lake Titicaca for irrigation works in areas surrounding and common to both countries.
- During the summer of 1958–59 the Puno Region was the scene of a disastrous drought that devastated the population. For this purpose, the 'Southern Plan' was developed to revitalize this area.
- Television was established in Peru, armed by the Industrial Promotion Act (1958). Soon after, the first television stations emerged.

=== Removal by coup d'état ===
At the end of his government Prado called elections, with the main candidates being:

- Victor Raul Haya de la Torre, by the Aprista Party.
- The architect Fernando Belaunde Terry, for the Popular Action party.
- The general and former president Manuel A. Odría, for his national Odrist Union party.

The elections were held on 10 June 1962. At the end of the count no candidate had obtained the one-third of the votes as required by the Political Constitution at the time, necessitating that Congress choose among those who had obtained the most votes, which were the three mentioned above. The situation required a pact between at least two of these three main opponents. Unusually for some, the pact was made between the two staunch enemies, Hague and Odría, remembering that the latter would assume the presidency of the republic. But the government was accused of having committed fraud in some departments, so the Joint Command of the Armed Forces presided over by General Ricardo Pérez Godoy demanded that the government annul the elections.

The Peruvian Armed Forces had been opposed to the Prado administration as it made reformist measures focused on civilian life, which resulted with the military receiving less support from the traditional elites and the Catholic Church. On 18 July 1962, the guard of the Government Palace was absent and at 3:20 am, an armored division commanded by Colonel Gonzalo Briceño Zevallos stormed the palace and arrested the president and his companions, who foresaw a possible coup d'état. On the same day Prado was transported to Callao's naval arsenal and embarked on the Callao BAP (anchored on San Lorenzo Island) where he was detained until the end of his term on 28 July. On 1 August he voluntarily left the country and settled in Paris.

A military governing board was formed that overturned the elections and convened new ones. It has been said that the real motive of this institutional coup of the Armed Forces was the anti-aprism still deeply rooted among the military, who did not want the APRA to rule, even in co-government.

== Later life ==
Prado left Peru and settled again in Paris. He made a brief visit to his homeland as he commemorated the centenary of the Battle of Callao (2 May 1966), when he was paid a tribute for being the son of President Mariano Ignacio Prado, who drove to Peru during the last stage of the conflict with Spain in 1865–66. He died in the French capital the following year. He was buried in the Presbítero Maestro Cemetery, next to his father.

== Gallery ==
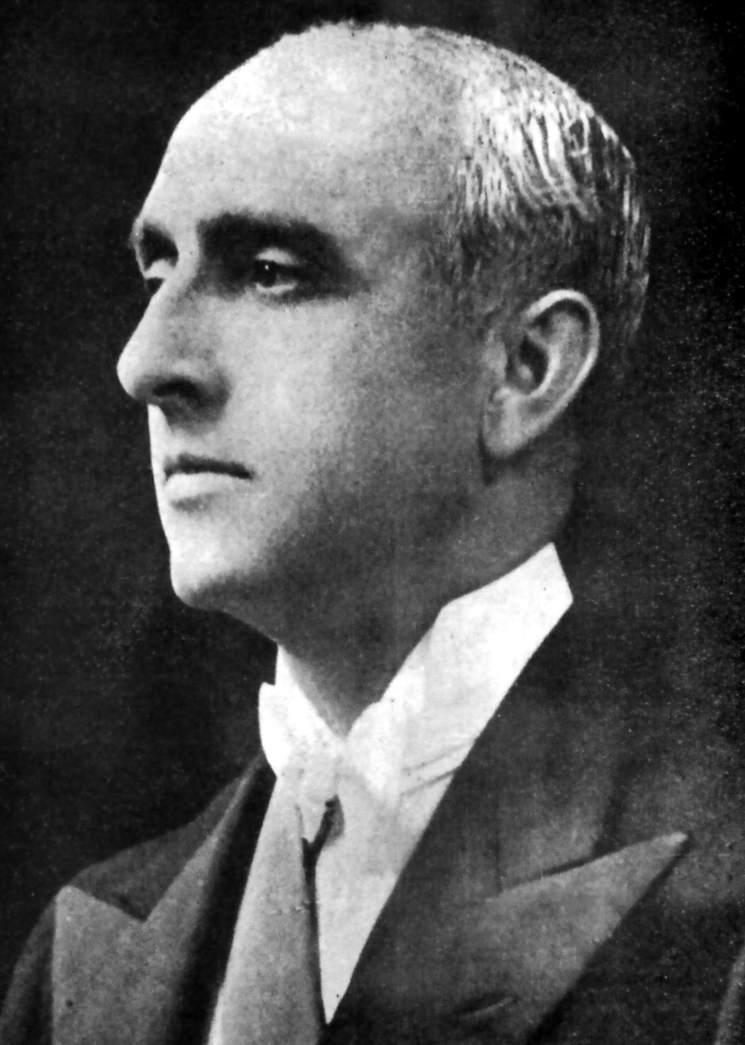
Prado in his early years

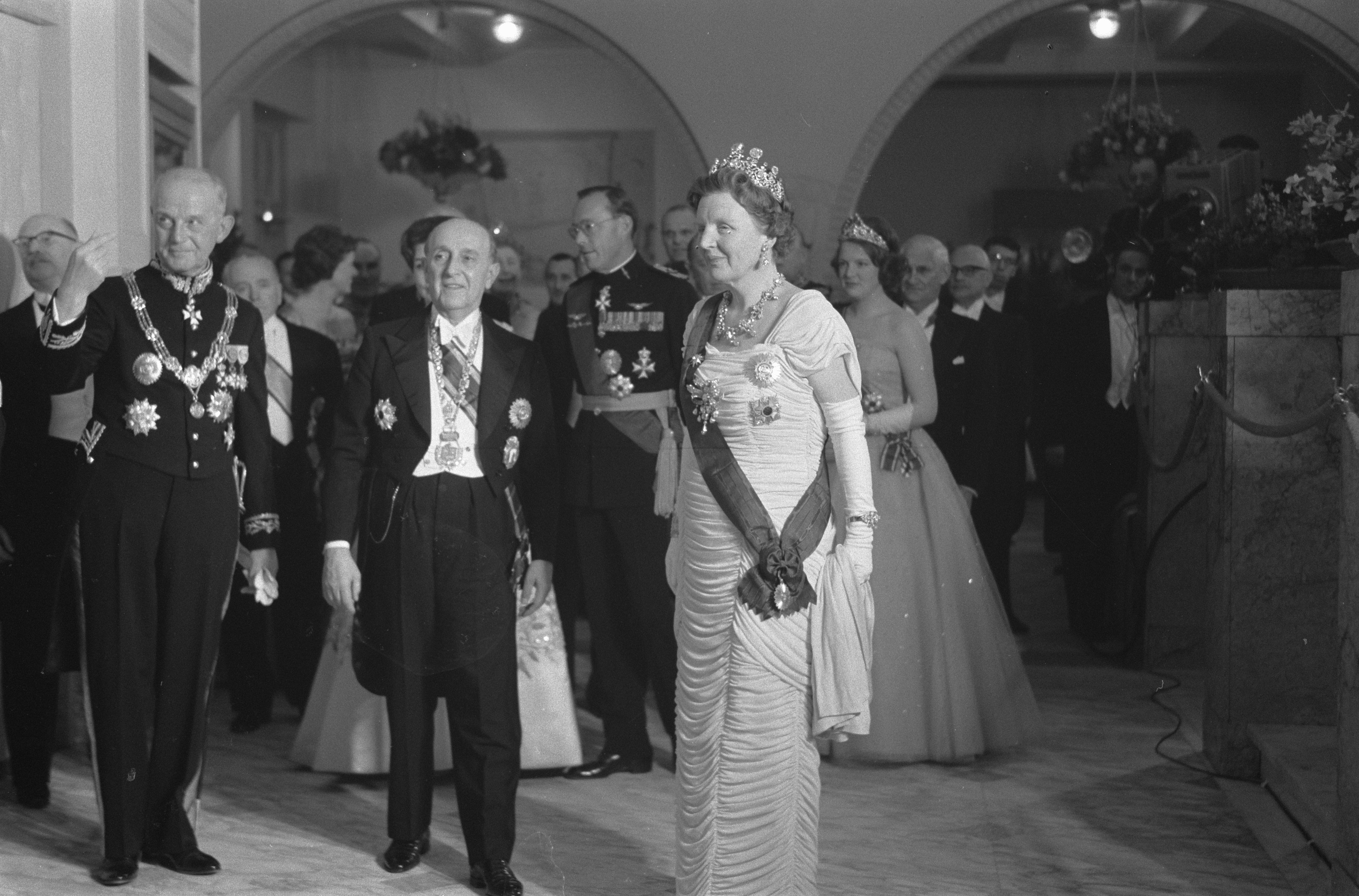
Prado with Queen Juliana in a state visit.

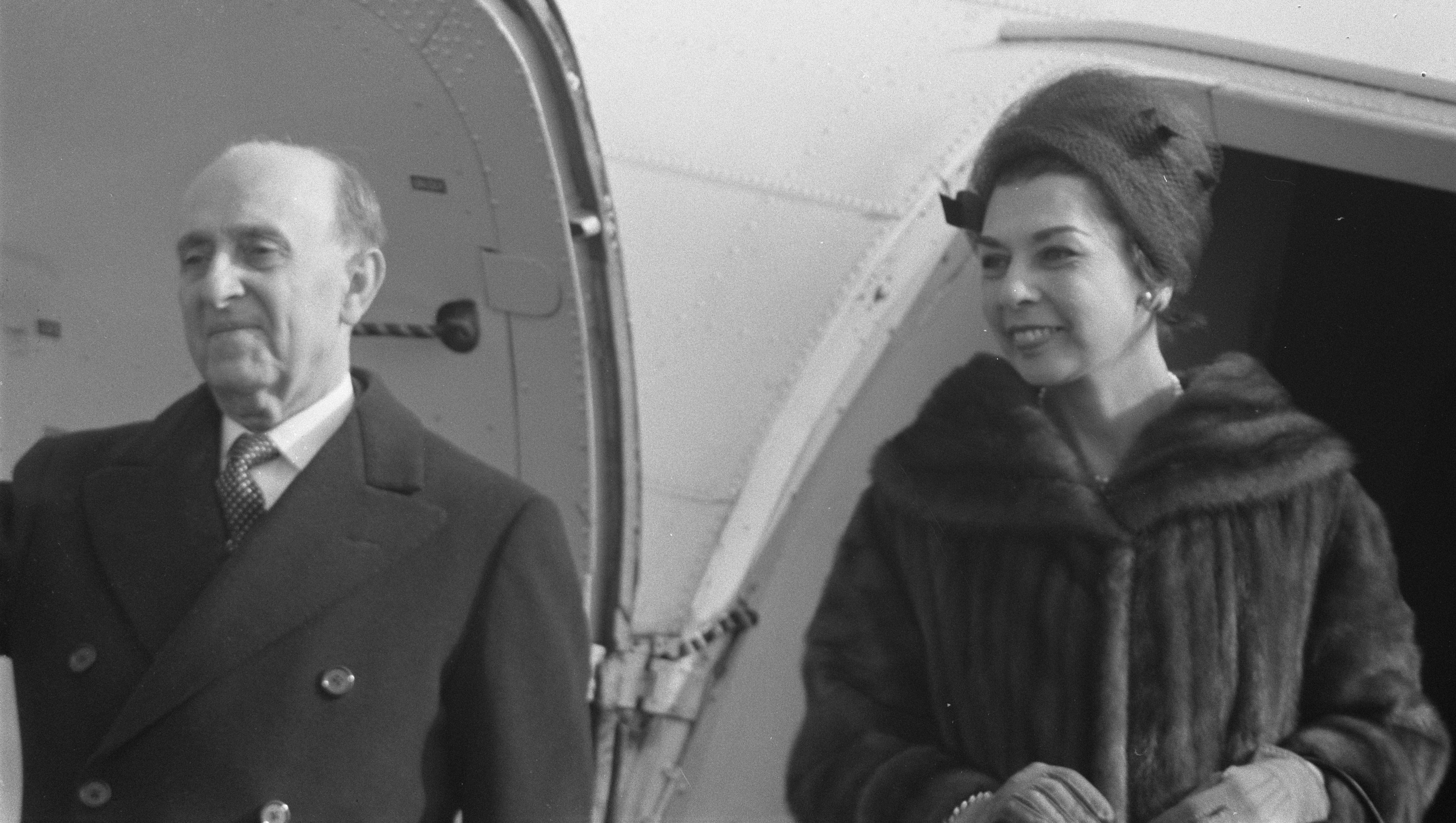
Prado with his wife

Coat of Arms

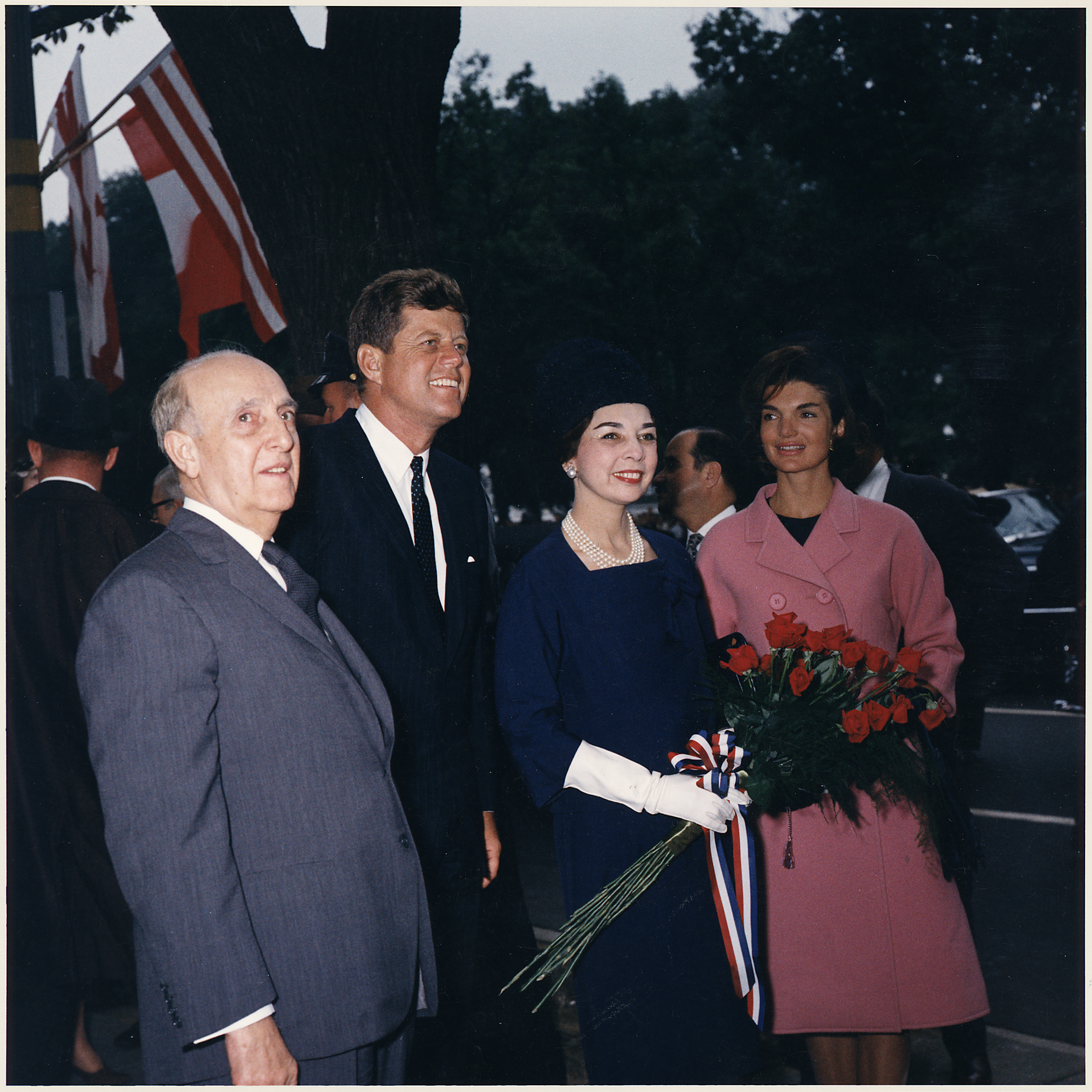
Prado with his wife, President John F. Kennedy, and Kennedy's wife

== See also ==
- Ecuadorian–Peruvian War

Political offices
Preceded by Óscar Benavides	President of Peru; 1939–1945	Succeeded by José Bustamante
Preceded by Manuel Odría	President of Peru; 1956–1962	Succeeded by Ricardo Pérez Godoy
