= History of Peru (1948–1956) =

Period of the history of Peru, 1948–1956

Peruvian Republic República Peruana
- 1948–1956
- Flag (after 1950) Coat of arms
- Motto: "Firme y feliz por la unión" (Spanish) "Firm and Happy for the Union"
- Anthem: "Himno Nacional del Perú" (Spanish) "National Anthem of Peru" March: "Marcha de Banderas" (Spanish) "March of Flags"
- Capital: Lima
- Common languages: Spanish
- Religion: Roman Catholicism
- Demonym: Peruvian
- Government: Unitary presidential republic under a military dictatorship
- President
  - 1948–1956: Manuel A. Odría
- Legislature: National Congress
- Historical era: Cold War
  - Coup d'état: 27–29 October 1948
  - Faux election: 2 July 1950
  - Odría takes office: 28 July 1950
  - New elections: 17 June 1956
  - Prado takes office: 28 July 1956
- Currency: Sol de oro
Preceded by	Succeeded by
Peru	Peru

The history of Peru between 1948 and 1956 corresponds to the presidency of General Manuel A. Odría, who overthrew José Luis Bustamante y Rivero through a coup d'état on October 29, 1948. The period's name in Spanish comes from the 8-year length of Odría's presidency (Spanish: Ochenio de Odría). It was a period that for Peru meant the return to militarism, liberal economic policies, repression and persecution of APRA leaders, and manipulative populism over the urban popular classes.

The regime was divided into two phases:

- The Military Government Junta (1948–1950): a de facto phase born from the successful coup d'état that overthrew the constitutional government of José Luis Bustamante y Rivero, contrary to the country's 1933 constitution.
- The "constitutional" government of Odría (1950–1956): following the general election organised by an Odriist-ran National Jury of Elections, where he was the only candidate, subsequently proclaiming himself President of Peru.

== Background ==
In 1945, with the victory of the candidacy of José Luis Bustamante y Rivero of the National Democratic Front, the country leant towards an alternative that embodied the aspiration for reconciliation and national progress. The negotiations beginning in January 1945 between Manuel Prado Ugarteche, Víctor Raúl Haya de la Torre and Óscar R. Benavides, respective representatives of the oligarchy, APRA and the Army, would result in said victory. It seemed that for Peru the time for democratisation and moderate changes had begun under the sign of conciliation and understanding. However, it would be this alliance with APRA that would distort his government since a government was installed where the APRAs had participation in several ministries as well as control in Congress.

The APRA parliamentary cell began to make unbridled opposition to the government, endangering governability. The most exalted APRA militants committed terrorist acts throughout the country. On January 7, 1947, Francisco Graña Garland, president of the board of directors of the newspaper La Prensa, was assassinated, an event that was blamed on the Apristas, since said newspaper was the standard bearer of anti-APRAism. This event produced a serious political crisis. Bustamante then decided to completely renew his Council of Ministers, leaving out the Apristas. He then swore in another ministerial cabinet made up mostly of military personnel, among whom was General Manuel A. Odría as Minister of Government and Police. Odría represented the radically anti-APRA tendency of the Army and was allied with the agro-mining export sector, opposed to Bustamante's exchange control policy that affected his economic interests.

The oligarchy had always been at odds with Bustamante's reformist tendencies and his willingness or, in any case, his intention to cooperate with the APRAs, a fact that caused considerable bitterness among its members. When the policies applied by Bustamante failed in their purpose of stabilising the country, those members of the National Alliance led by Pedro Beltrán Espantoso (AN) began to conspire with the Armed Forces. The overthrow of Bustamante and the elimination of APRA from the political life of the republic were its objectives, and once again the oligarchy would use military sectors to achieve them.

In his capacity as minister, Odría insisted Bustamante to outlaw APRA. As the president refused this demand, the entire cabinet resigned. Thus the political crisis was raised, between the government and the military. These, instigated by the agro-mining export sector, plotted a coup d'état. For their part, the APRAs planned a coup of their own. Elements of the APRA left wing went ahead and encouraged the rebellion of the sailors in Callao, which was bloodily crushed by the army on October 3, 1948. Immediately after the revolt, Bustamante declared the APRA illegal, but the Army and the oligarchy believed that party members should be actively persecuted. Bustamante was not willing to apply widespread repression; However, it was already too late, the failed revolt of October 3 gave them the necessary excuse to carry out the conspiracy. The military led by Odría hastened his coup d'état.

=== Coup d'état ===
On October 27, 1948, Odría mutinied in the city of Arequipa, and after two days of struggle he won the support of the Armed Forces and overthrew President Bustamante. A manifesto was proclaimed from Arequipa, a city where historically revolts had begun and where, eighteen years ago, Luis Miguel Sánchez Cerro had proclaimed his own September Manifesto. Odría, at the head of the Arequipa garrison, rose up against the constitutional government of Bustamante and Rivero. The express justification of the movement, which significantly calls itself "restorative revolution," is anti-aprismo or the "defense of the country against aprismo." It was precisely this radical anti-aprism that allowed Odría to have the support of a more nationalist sector of the army and less inclined to an alliance with the oligarchy. Odría read a Manifesto to the Nation through Radio Continental, in which he declared the following:

The revolution that broke out in Arequipa is for a just, noble and patriotic cause: saving the armed institutes that are the basis of national defense; rebuild democratic life, reestablish the rule of the Constitution and, finally, end the period of misery and hunger that overwhelms our people.

— Manuel A. Odría

His words were no different from those of previous leaders: it was necessary for Peru to obtain new leadership, since the current president was leading the country to ruin with his indecision. However, behind General Odría's coup was the National Alliance, that is, the oligarchy commanded by the exporters and especially by Pedro Beltrán, who was immediately named president of the Central Reserve Bank of Peru. Odría and the military would be well-compensated but docile instruments. After finishing his arguments in favor of a revolt, Odría ended his manifesto with an ironic cry of "Long live Democracy!"

The other garrisons in the country, such as those in Cuzco and in the north, hesitated to join the movement initiated in Arequipa, but its triumph was decided when the Lima garrison, under the command of General Zenón Noriega, joined the coup. President Bustamante y Rivero was forcibly put on a plane at Limatambo International Airport, bound for Buenos Aires, on October 29. The coup d'état thus ended successfully. General Zenón Noriega temporarily assumed the presidency, until the arrival of Odría, from the south.

== History ==
=== First phase ===
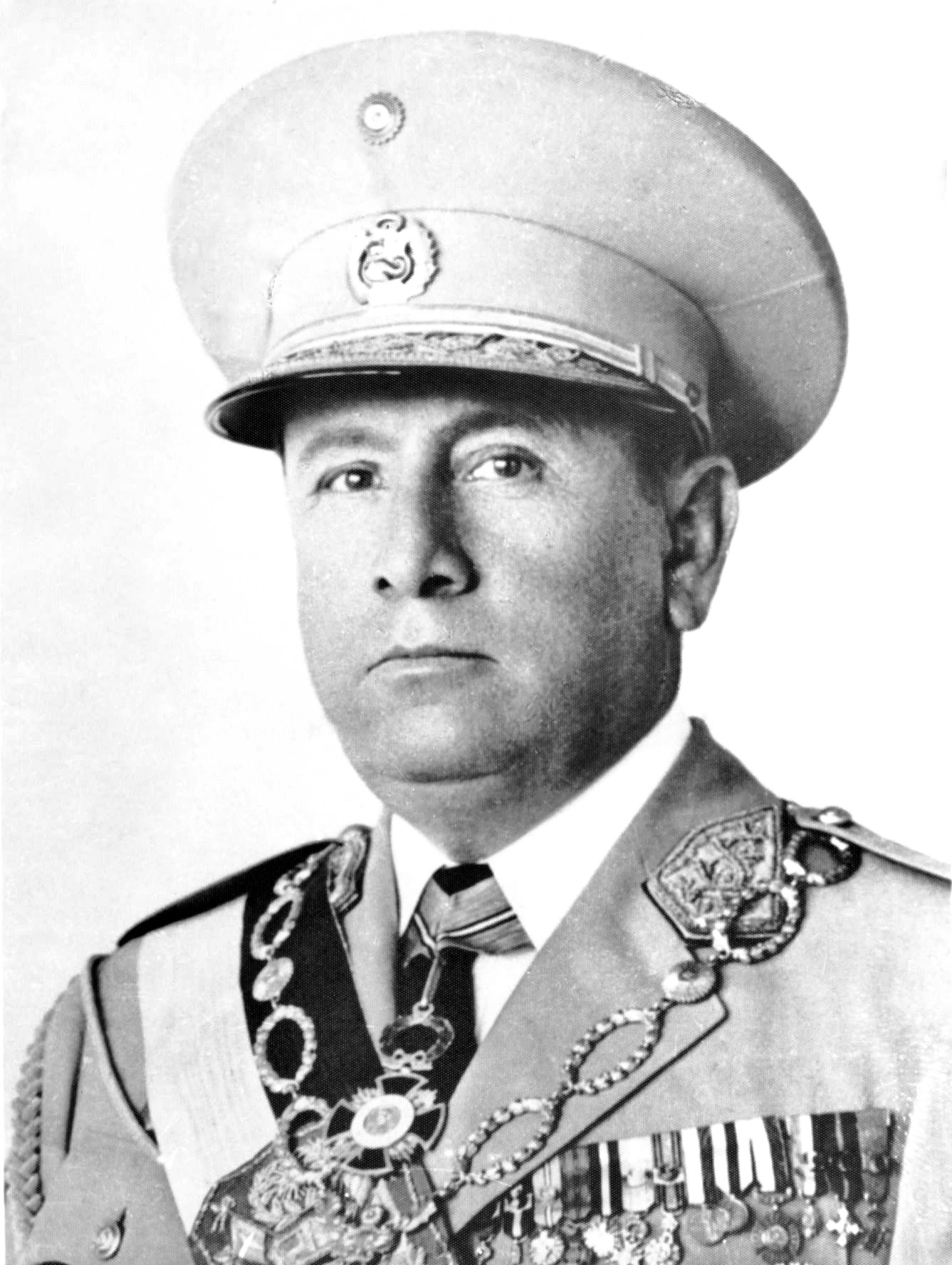
- Presidency of Manuel A. Odría; President of the Military Government Junta; 1 November 1948 – 1 June 1950
- Cabinet: See list
- Party: Odriist National Union
- Standard of the President

On October 31, Odría was sworn in as president of the Military Government Junta. The rest of the members of this junta were the following: Generals Zenón Noriega (Minister of War) and José Villanueva Pinillos (Aeronautics); Colonels Emilio Pereyra (Treasury), Luis Ramírez Ortiz, Juan Mendoza Rodríguez (Public Education), Alberto López (Public Health), Marcial Romero Pardo (Justice) and Carlos Miñano (Agriculture); Lieutenant Colonels Augusto Villacorta (Government and Police) and Alfonso Llosa G.P. (Promotion); and Rear Admirals Federico Díaz Dulanto (Foreign Relations) and Roque A. Saldías (Navy). Eduardo Rivera Schreiber was appointed secretary of the Junta.

After becoming provisional president two days after the coup, Odría wasted little time in applying a series of severe measures aimed at restoring public order. The first of these was the ban on those "international parties" that, according to those in power, had been responsible for the crisis that warranted the intervention of the Armed Forces. From the beginning this government was violently imposed with the suppression of individual guarantees, which was enshrined indefinitely with an arbitrary Internal Security Law (Decree Law No. 11049 of July 1, 1949), which established the crimes considered against security and public tranquility that had political or social purposes. It also established crimes against the organisation and internal peace of the Republic.

The economy underwent a shift towards liberalism, although without falling into extremes. They wanted to modernise the economy, for which the North American mission chaired by Julius Klein was hired, which recommended the free market system. Odría attended to the main recommendations of this mission: elimination of subsidies, free trade, disappearance of controls and budget balance. The economic crisis could thus be contained. In the labour sphere, the Military Government Junta combined repression with political patronage, the Confederation of Workers of Peru (CTP) was banned and its main union leaders persecuted or killed. On the other hand, the Junta granted social benefits to workers, created a National Education Fund destined exclusively for school construction, and a National Health Fund. Thus the first steps of a vast work were taken that would be fully developed under the constitutional government of Odría.

Fear was used as a tool to obtain the consent of Peruvians: the death penalty was restored in cases of political unrest, censorship was imposed, and the right of assembly was prohibited. Although effective in the short term, Odría was aware that he could not govern the country indefinitely in this way. It was necessary to create the impression of some constitutional order. Odría announced that free and competitive elections would be held in May 1950. Given the atmosphere of repression and the existence of the Internal Security Law, most Peruvians believed that the elections would take place, but not in a free or competitive manner.

Regarding changes in the executive, on April 30, 1949, Decree Law 11009 was promulgated. With its promulgation, the Ministry of Labour and Indigenous Affairs was created, which was separated from the Ministry of Justice and Labour. An organising body for the new office was formed. This was chaired by the head of Justice and Labour, Lieutenant Colonel Marcial Merino. In addition, it was made up of the director of Labour, the director of Indigenous Affairs and, as secretary, the head of the Legislation Division of the General Directorate of Labour.

On May 31, General Armando Artola del Pozo was appointed as the first head of the Ministry of Labour and Indigenous Affairs. He directed the sector for five years, two months and twenty-two days, one of the longest in institutional history. He ceased to hold office on August 9, 1954. On October 29, 1949, the Military Government Junta appointed Colonel Augusto Romero Lovo as head of Justice and Worship, who took office on November 9. The members of the Junta were all military personnel, whose promotions corresponded to their merits and services, registered in a general War and Navy rank.

==== 1950 Elections ====
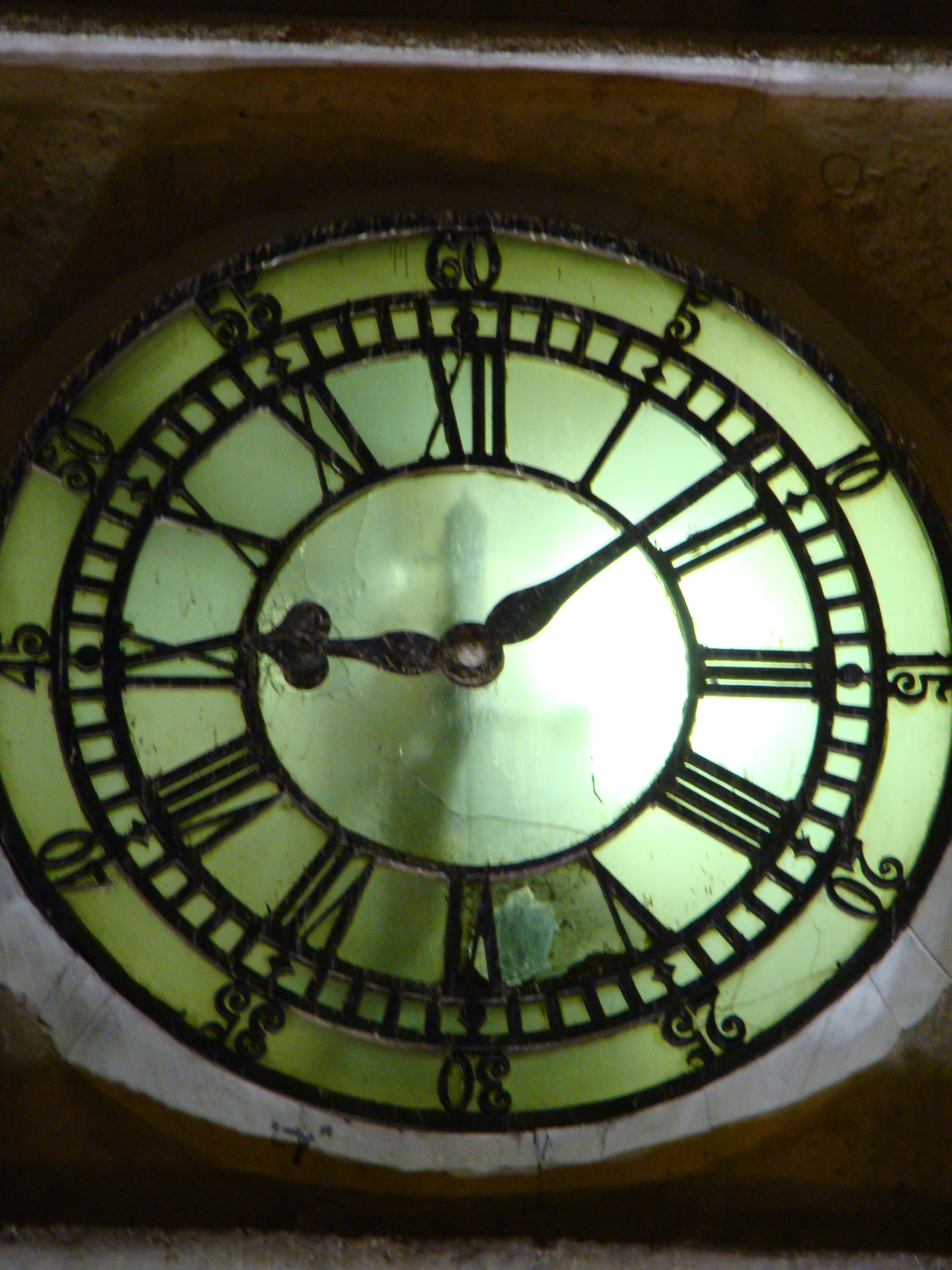
Bullet hole at the Cathedral of Arequipa dating back to the 1950 revolt.

To legitimise himself in power, Odría decided to call presidential elections in which he himself would be the candidate. But there was a formal problem: according to the 1933 Constitution, the citizen who aspired to the presidency did not have to simultaneously exercise power, which he had to renounce at least six months before the elections. Odría solved the problem in his own way: with just three months left before the elections, he left power, entrusting the presidency of the Junta to General Zenón Noriega on June 1, 1950. This act is known as the "descent to the plain" (Spanish: bajada al llano). Odría formed the National Restoration Party and began his presidential campaign, knowing that with the Internal Security Law active he would enjoy easy elections, that is, without the presence of annoying competitors.

Within the oligarchy they realised that General Odría was a person that was "difficult to handle". The new appreciation they had developed for the democratic process stemmed from a fear of Odría's economic policies and the hope that the oligarchy could directly govern the country. Faced with doubt and the small division of the oligarchy, the National Democratic League was formed, which was made up of people with different ideological points of view, including several members of the Front, and the search immediately began for a candidate of "unity." national". In this way, retired general Ernesto Montagne Markholz, former president of the Council of Ministers during the second government of Óscar R. Benavides, was elected, under the logic that another representative of the Army would have more possibilities to confront Odría.

The National Jury of Elections disqualified Montagne, claiming that the signatures presented by his party were false. This action led to a limited revolt in the city of Arequipa that was quickly crushed. Among the revolutionaries were some visible elements of the National Democratic League. This was sufficient reason for the candidate Montagne to be arrested, accused of conspiring with APRA and exiled. In this way, without a political challenger, Odría participated unopposed during the election process on July 2, 1950, with an electoral card that only had his name on it.

=== Second phase ===
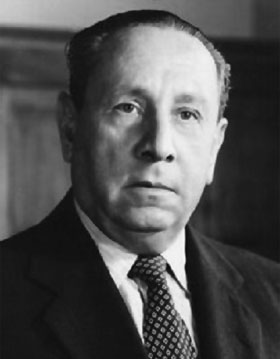
- Presidency of Manuel A. Odría; Constitutional President of the Republic; 28 July 1950 – 28 July 1956
- Cabinet: See list
- Party: Odriist National Union
- Election: 1950
- Standard of the President

Odría was sworn in as Constitutional President on July 28, 1950, before a Parliament also elected by popular vote. Politically, he kept the Internal Security Law in force, which severely repressed opponents of the regime, mainly APRA and communists. In general terms, he continued the work laid out during the period of the Military Junta. His government was also characterised by populism, serving as the continuation of the Junta. Immediately after taking office, the Ministerial Cabinet was formed, whose leadership was handed over to General Zenón Noriega, as well as the Ministry of War.

The following people made up the Cabinet: Zenón Noriega, Manuel Gallagher Canaval (Foreign Relations), Ricardo de la Puente y Ganoza (Government and Police), Alberto Freundt Rosell (Justice and Worship), Andrés F. Dasso (Treasury and Commerce), the Lieutenant Colonel José Cabrejo Mejía (Public Development and Works), Rear Admiral Roque A. Saldías (Navy), Colonel Juan Mendoza Rodríguez (Public Education), Edgardo Rebagliati (Health and Social Assistance), C.A.P. General José C. Villanueva, Luis Dibos Dammert (Agriculture) and Armando Artola (Labour and Indigenous Affairs). In this Cabinet, only six, out of a total of twelve supreme offices, were directed by the military.

More than 28 foreign delegations were present for the transfer of command ceremony. Among them were the Argentine Foreign Minister Hipólito Jesús Paz and Virgilio Díaz Ordóñez of the Dominican Republic.

==== Repression policy ====
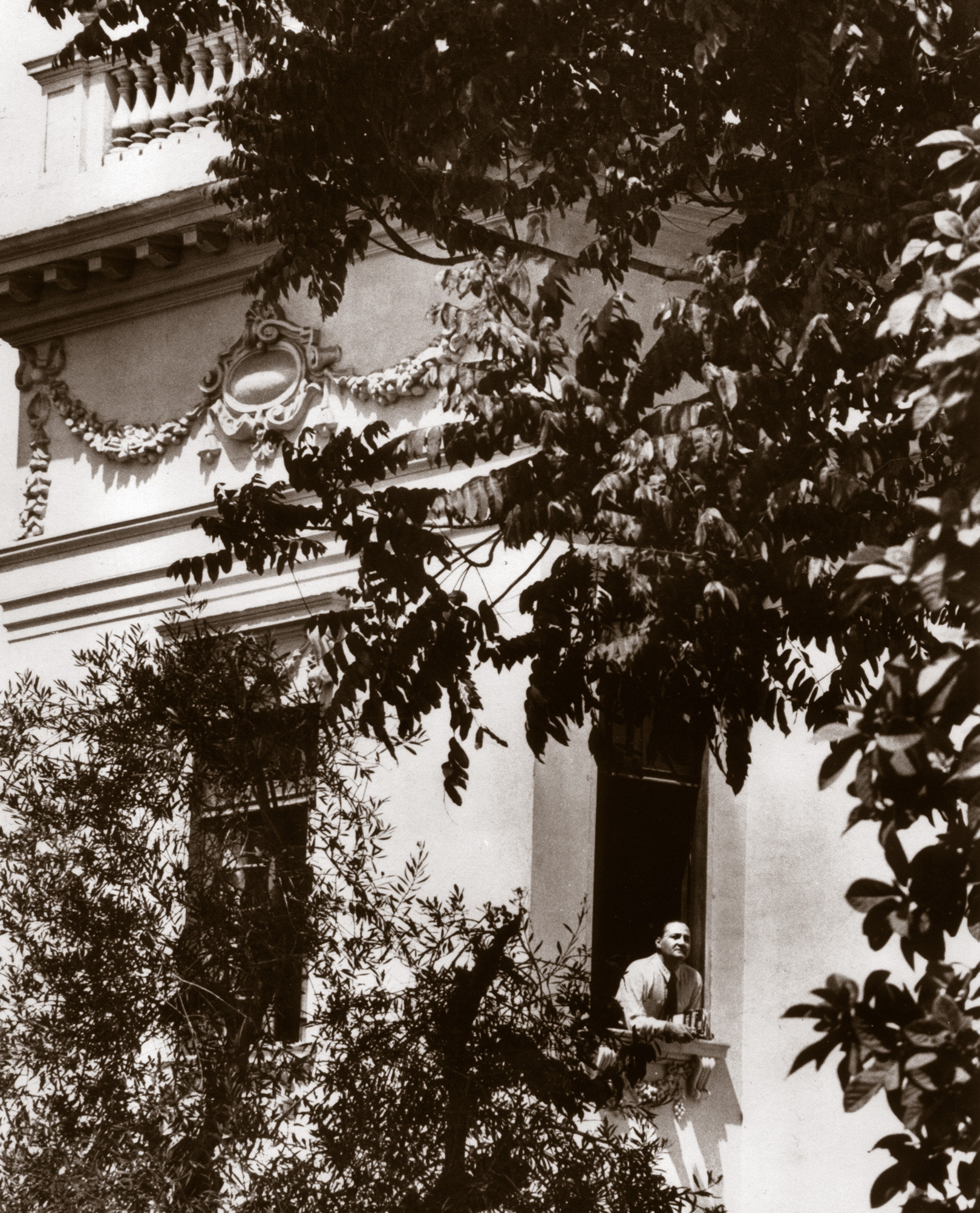
Víctor Raúl Haya de la Torre remained at the Colombian embassy from 1949 to 1954.

The regime was characterised by authoritarianism and repression of all forms of political opposition. Political repression was embodied in the figure of the director and later Minister of Government, Alejandro Esparza Zañartu. Thousands of opponents were arrested and tortured and hundreds of them were exiled. Corruption was rampant in all sectors of the State due to the lack of rigorous oversight.

The efforts made by the regime during its first days against the Aprista Party proved successful as the nation's prisons began to be filled with its members. At the beginning of 1949, Haya de la Torre sought asylum at the Colombian Embassy, assuming that the regime would have no alternative but to grant him the safe passage necessary for his departure.

Haya was a very controversial figure who generated discomfort among members of the Armed Forces and the oligarchy, who refused to accept him as a legitimate actor in Peruvian political life. These characters advised Odría to deny any request from the Colombian government. In this way, the Peruvian authorities argued that Haya de la Torre was not a politically persecuted person, but rather a common criminal and, therefore, the privilege of asylum could not be extended to him. The matter was brought before the International Court of Justice. Finally, the Peruvian government allowed Haya de la Torre to leave the embassy, immediately sending him into exile. The incident discredited the government internationally, since the image that Haya de la Torre projected was that of a persecuted politician, exiled for his leftist ideas.

=== Economy ===
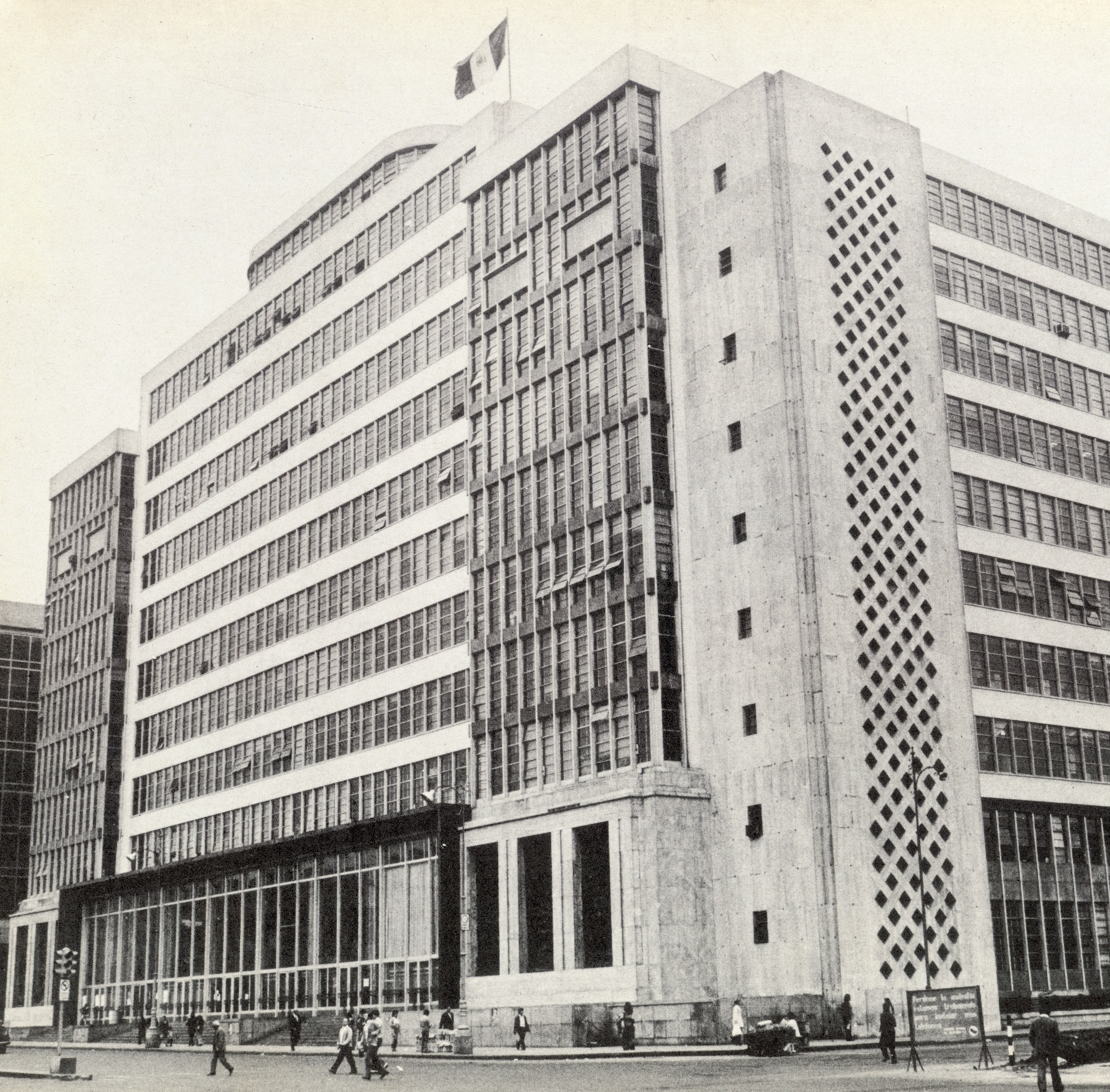
Building of the Ministry of Finance (1954).

The priority of the Odría regime in the economic aspect was to end the financial crisis that had affected Peru since the end of the Second World War. The first step was to hire an American mission led by economist Julius Klein. As expected, the entity's report recommended that it was necessary to further liberalise the economy. In this way, special emphasis was placed on the elimination of exchange controls imposed by previous administrations, a recommendation that Odría followed to the letter. He in turn opted for a liberal economic policy and the promotion of exports; in part, due to the pact that the dictator had established with some figures from the oligarchic right, who had financed and helped organise the 1948 coup d'état.

Once this was done, the value of the sol fell and as a consequence, exports rose to the delight of the oligarchy, especially those with interests in the cotton and sugar sectors. The liberation of the economy not only benefited domestic exporters, but also presented new opportunities for foreign companies, especially Americans, whose presence in Peruvian territory reached levels not seen since the days of the Leguía regime.

However, the government's measures were at some distance from the exporters' claims. Odría did not give in to pressure from his allies and sponsors because he was afraid that immediate deregulation would lead to inflation and impoverishment of workers, which could cost him the power in which he had just been asserting himself. Furthermore, the government's desire not to be identified as an instrument of the oligarchy must be taken into account.

A sign of how dependent the Peruvian economy had become on the North American market came with the Korean War. Due to U.S. demand, the value of Peruvian exports increased dramatically. This fact brought greater state revenue for Peru, which was used to finance public works that increased the population's support for Odría. Thus, Odría and his team began to show a populist streak, which was disturbing for the oligarchy. The president believed that an unconditional concession to exporters that would lead to his own policy with problematic results was not advisable, since it could cost him power.

==== Public works ====
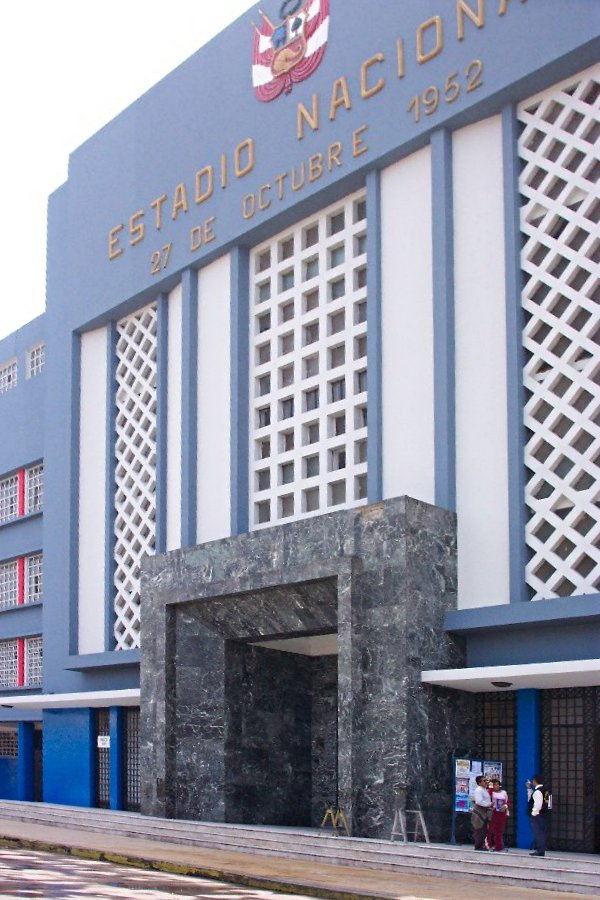
The National Stadium, built in 1952.

The boom in economic activity allowed Odría to develop a vast public works plan. His government motto was precisely: "Deeds and not words" (Spanish: Hechos y no palabras). Investments, which in 1948 reached 126,000,000 soles, increased to 1,000,000,000 in 1953. Likewise, work opportunities and health care were provided through the execution of public works.

- A strong area of public works was directed towards the construction of the "Large School Units" (G.U.E.) both in Lima and in the main cities of the country, as well as hospitals, ministries, hotels, etc. Many of these works were destined for Odría's hometown, Tarma, and Tacna. An emblematic work was the construction of the National Stadium of Lima, considered at the time as a colossal work and which would be remodelled much later, in 2011.
- Important irrigation works were carried out, the main one being the diversion of the Quiroz River to the Piura Valley, initiated by the previous government; Likewise, the work to divert water from Lake Choclococha to the Ica River was activated, the international canal in the Zarumilla River was enabled, in coordination with Ecuador, and other small irrigation in the departments of Cajamarca and La Libertad.
- An important road construction plan was carried out, improving existing roads and opening others towards the interior of the country.
- Oil exploitation was promoted by the promulgation of the organic oil law of March 18, 1952.
- The industrialisation process continued. For the benefit of large industry, electrification projects were formulated.
- To encourage mining investment, a Mining Code was enacted in 1950. The most important investments were made by foreign companies (particularly U.S. companies). The exploitation of the Toquepala and Quellaveco copper deposits, and the Marcona iron deposits, began. The mining boom was also due to international needs derived from the Korean War.

==== National defence ====
The Odría government strengthened the Peruvian Army, whose services were improved.

- By Law No. 11432, the Army was reorganised, giving them new regulations according to the advances in military technique. Successful legal provisions were given such as the *Organic Law of the Army, the Military Promotions Law, and the Code of Military Justice.
- The installation of machinery for the Navy Industrial Service (SIMA) began, with the capacity to manufacture large capacity ships.
- The dock and the submarine base were expanded.
- The Naval Medical Centre and Central Military Hospital in Lima came into operation.
- Destroyers, submarines and river gunboats were acquired for the service of the Amazon River.
- The Air Force was reorganised. Pilot training for jet aircraft began in the United States.
- The army participated in literacy campaigns and in carrying out road works.
- A special income was established for the Air Force, the Pisco air base facilities were completed and jet aircraft were acquired.
- The Center for Higher National Studies (CAEM) was created, a higher training center for officers of the Armed Forces, which led to studies of a political-social nature as part of national defence.

=== Society ===
Many things had changed in relation to Peru at the beginning of the 20th century, socially, the country began a true demographic explosion in the 1940s, where the infant mortality rate would begin to reduce and a relatively high birth rate would be maintained. The country's population doubled in thirty years: from six and a half million in 1940, it reached nine million nine hundred thousand in the 1961 census and up to thirteen and a half million in the 1972 census. This population demanded increasing health services, housing and education, which has since meant fertile ground for populism of any tendency.

Odría decided to follow in the footsteps of Juan Domingo Perón, starting a regime that was both conservative and populist, which was able to maintain itself due to the rise of the Peruvian economy. He tried to attract people from the marginal towns of Lima, with the help of his wife María Delgado Romero, who also followed in the footsteps of Eva Perón and managed to increase the social bases of the Odría government. She presided over the Social Assistance Center, founded in 1951 and where care was provided to women and children. She also reformed the electoral system, when on September 7, 1955, she allowed, for the first time in Republican history, the female vote.

==== Barriadas ====
Throughout his time as governor, Odría sought to foster "an authoritarian pattern of informal, paternalistic ties that tended to obscure class identification." This approach to elite-mass relations went well with the more general strategy to limit pluralism in Peruvian society. The popular support that APRA and the unions had at that time constitutes an important background to understand the importance that Odría—just as Sánchez Cerro and Benavides had done—gave to obtaining the support of the popular sectors.

This led him to provide extensive support for the construction of barriadas. Instead, he received political support from the new inhabitants of those parts of Lima that served to legitimise his mandate. The fact that even after Odría had left the presidency there were demonstrations of support demonstrates the strong identification of the residents with the president who had helped them establish themselves and that the Odriist strategy of making the poor believe in a special relationship with him had given fruit.

The paternalistic aspect of their barriada policies is expressed in the non-granting of titles, clientelism, the promotion of associations of residents without political demands and large-scale aid programs. Between 1945 and 1948 there was a considerable increase in the size of the invasions. Odría's policies strongly influenced the subsequent development of the political management of the neighbourhoods: this new urban political sector had to be taken into account by the future leaders of the country.

=== Education ===
The development of national education was focused through three programmes:

- The National Education Fund, to finance infrastructure works.
- The National Education Plan, aimed at extending education to the entire country.
- The School Book Fund.

The highest budget percentage of the 20th century was allocated to education, with then Colonel Juan Mendoza Rodríguez being the main minister in that branch. A curricular reform was implemented, teacher training was attended to, and a vast plan for the construction of premises was executed: large school units (G.U.E.), primary schools, pedagogical institutes, throughout the country. Apart from their good infrastructure, these schools also had a high-quality educational staff.

The Ministry of Education was equipped with a modern building located in front of the University Park, currently the headquarters of judicial bodies. The implementation of July 6 as "Teacher's Day" also dates from this time. Technical and rural education was the subject of substantial reforms. Various industrial schools in Lima and the provinces were provided with teaching materials. The number of pre-vocational schools, industrial institutes for women and agricultural education centers increased.

=== Healthcare ===
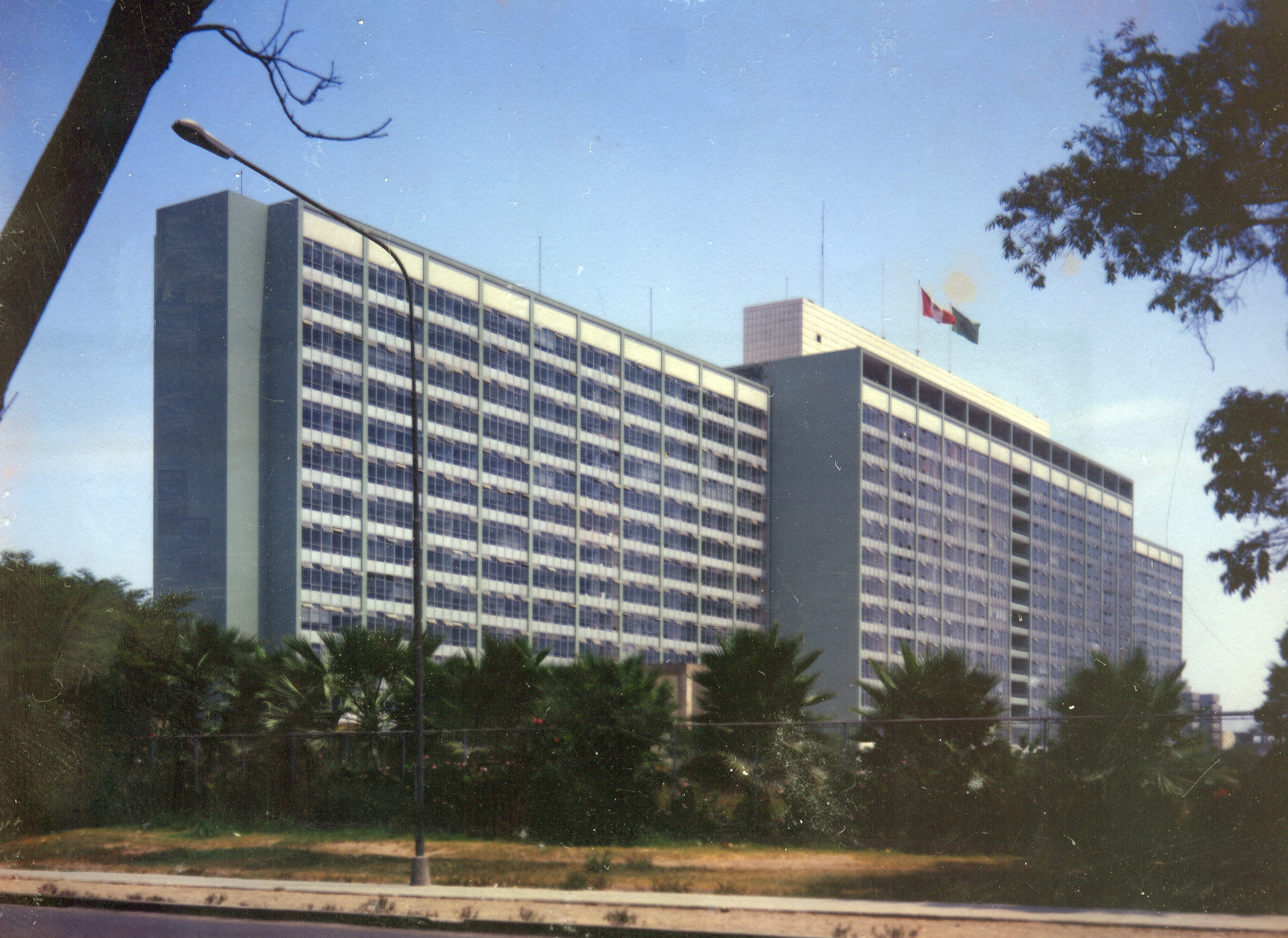
Hospital of the Employee (1952).

- A National Health Fund was created.
- Work was made to public health services. The Hospital of the Employee was built in Lima, conveniently equipped, as did hospitals elsewhere in the country.
- Intense environmental sanitation works and campaigns against endemic and epidemic diseases were carried out.
- To improve the nutrition of schoolchildren, workers and employees, restaurants and school cafeterias were built.

=== Labour ===
- The Ministry of Labour and Indigenous Affairs was created to channel workers' claims (1949). Its first officeholder was Armando Artola del Pozo.
- The increase in compensation for work accidents by 70% was decreed.
- Social security became mandatory for public and private employees.
- The compensation regime for length of service was consolidated.
- Bonuses for national holidays and Christmas were established, as well as the Sunday salary.
- A commission was appointed to prepare the Yanaconaje Law.
- Salaries were raised for workers in the civil construction industry in Lima, Callao and seaside resorts, as well as stevedores at the port of Callao.
- The amount of pensions for retirees was raised.
- An ambitious policy was carried out to build popular housing for workers and employees throughout the country. The housing units of Matute, Santa Marina and La Perla, in Lima and Callao, date from then. The Huampaní Vacation Centre was also built for family recreation.

=== Indigenous affairs ===
- The indigenous communities received technical and credit aid for the development of their agricultural activities.
- With the support of Food and Agriculture Organization, UNESCO and World Health Organization, a rehabilitation programme was developed for the Puno region, then affected by a terrible drought.

=== Foreign affairs ===
- Due to the emphatic anti-communism of the military regime, as well as its liberal economic policies, the consequence was the registration of the Peruvian government on the United States' side of the Cold War. This happened given that, for the military government to be accepted by the United States, the Odría government had to orient its economy towards free trade and the promotion of exports.
- American direct investment skyrocketed under two mechanisms. On the one hand, the Mining Code of 1950, which allowed the emergence of North American mining enclaves in Toquepala and Marcona, increasing foreign control of mining. On the other hand, the Petroleum Law of 1952 allowed the International Petroleum Company to search for new oil fields in the Sechura Desert.
- Incidents occurred on the border with Ecuador, because the milestones had not yet been placed in Lagartococha and in the areas adjacent to the Zamora and Santiago rivers. The government remained unwavering in the face of Ecuadorian claims that sought to redefine the dividing line in said area, violating the Rio Protocol signed in 1942.
- On August 18, 1952, representatives of Peru, Chile and Ecuador signed the "Santiago Declaration" in Santiago de Chile, protecting the ichthyological wealth within the space of 200 nautical miles, in the face of the threat of depredations by foreign fleets. Subsequently, in December 1955, the plenipotentiaries of the same countries signed the protocol of dccession to said declaration in Quito.
- Economic and cultural collaboration agreements were signed with Brazil, as well as with Chile and Ecuador.
- Peru hosted the Pan-American Highway and Inter-American Tourism Congress, the II Ibero-American Social Security Congress and the II Conference on conservation and exploitation of the maritime wealth of the Pacific.
- The state of war with West Germany and Japan was ended, whose delegations acquired the rank of embassies, and diplomatic relations with Cuba and Colombia were resumed.

=== Justice ===
- The Sepa Penal Agricultural Colony was inaugurated in Loreto.
- A commission was appointed to reform the organic law of the judiciary.
- The Women's Reeducation Center, Workshop and School was inaugurated in Chorrillos, replacing the old Lima Women's Penitentiary and Departmental Prison.
- The judicial career was established.
- New chambers were created in the superior courts of Arequipa, Lambayeque, Ica and Huánuco and the Second Correctional Court of Arequipa.
- The prisons of Pampas, La Oroya, Huanta, Recuay, Lampa, Yauri and Jumbilla were built.

=== End ===
==== Arequipa revolt ====
By 1954 there were already signs of the decomposition of the regime. Accused of being a conspirator, General Zenón Noriega, president of the Council of Ministers, considered the number two of the regime, was exiled to the United States. In exchange, in August 1954, Rear Admiral Roque Augusto Saldías Maninat was appointed, who became head of the Cabinet for the second time. On July 20, 1955, the editors of the newspaper La Prensa prepared a statement in which they demanded the repeal of the Internal Security Law, electoral reform and general political amnesty. This document served as the starting point for the founding of the National Coalition, headed by Pedro Roselló, Manuel Mujica Gallo and Pedro G. Beltrán.

A meeting of the Coalition, held in the Municipal theatre of Arequipa, was attacked by thugs in the service of the government, starting a protest similar to that of 1950. The city declared a general strike and called for the dismissal of the Government Minister, Alejandro Esparza Zañartu, who was also former director of that institution. This is due to the fact that his figure generated rejection due to the abuses committed against the regime's detractors, including persecutions and kidnappings. Unlike what happened in 1950, this time Odría did not want to send military troops to suppress the revolt and Esparza had to resign at the end of December 1955, going into exile. This episode marked the beginning of the end of the Odriísta regime. At the same time, former president José Luis Bustamante y Rivero and the most important APRA leaders, such as Armando Villanueva and Ramiro Prialé, returned from exile. In the long run, the National Coalition did not take root popularly and other political movements emerged for the 1956 elections.

==== New elections ====
People were afraid that the regime would last forever, which is why Odría's decision to call general elections in 1956 and his announcement not to present himself as a candidate was surprising. The truth was that the regime was already very worn out. Odría himself was physically handicapped as a result of a fracture in his hip and another in his femur. Three candidates presented themselves:

- Dr. Hernando de Lavalle y García, who had the initial support of the government, which had purposely formed its own political party, the Restoration Party, which would later be baptised as the Odriist National Union. He was also supported by the recently founded Christian Democratic Party.
- Former president Manuel Prado Ugarteche, for the Peruvian Democratic Movement. Belonging to a family of important social influence and great economic power, Prado was the owner of the newspaper La Crónica and a series of companies, including Banco de Crédito.
- The architect Fernando Belaúnde Terry, launched by the Democratic Youth Front, whose registration was imposed on the National Jury of Elections after a memorable protest that Belaunde made in the center of Lima, known as the manguerazo. This Front was the origin of the Popular Action party.

A mass party like APRA was prevented from participating in the elections and therefore the votes of its members would be decisive in the contest. The APRA leaders decided to negotiate their votes, in exchange for the best offer that the candidates made. Lavalle offered a party statute that would grant legality to APRA on an undetermined date, which for the APRAs was not enough. It was Prado who had the ability to win the support of the APRAs, whom he promised to lift the ban on the first day he took power, repealing the famous Internal Security Law. Later, Odría himself would support Prado's candidacy, to the detriment of Lavalle.

In this context, the Iquitos garrison, headed by General Marcial Merino, revolted against Odría on February 16, 1956. The newspaper La Prensa published the manifesto of the rebels, for which its director, Pedro G. Beltrán, was arrested. and sent to El Frontón prison along with a group of his workers, while the newspaper stopped being published. The uprising did not spread to the rest of the department, and faced with Odría's threat to bomb Iquitos, the rebels surrendered on February 26, while Marcial Merino had to flee to Colombia.

The elections were held on June 17, 1956. The official results were the following: Manuel Prado Ugarteche, 568,134 votes (45.5%); Fernando Belaúnde Terry, 457,638 votes (36.7%) and Hernando de Lavalle, 222,323 votes (17.8%).

==== Pact of Monterrico ====
One of Odría's main concerns was to get his successor to commit to not investigating corruption and political crimes of his government. Although Odría's legal income during the eight-year period totaled around 300,000 soles, he had accumulated properties worth 3,000,000 in the department of Lima alone. Other members of his family and ministers of the regime had also become rich.

Apparently, when Prado's electoral victory seemed likely, an agreement was reached between Prado and Odría, ensuring that the issue of corruption would not be opened by the new regime. Thus, no investigation was carried out in the following years, despite the fact that the corrupt practices of the Odría regime were publicly denounced in great detail by opposition leaders such as Héctor Cornejo Chávez. The parliamentary list headed by José Gálvez and made up of Raúl Porras Barrenechea—supported by APRA—did not rule on the case of mismanagement of public finances in the Odría government.

On July 28, 1956, Manuel Prado y Ugarteche wore the presidential sash, which he received from the president of the Senate, José Gálvez Barrenechea. Thus, the eight-year regime was put to an end.

== Cabinet ==
Ministry	Ministers	Period	
Ministry	Ministers	Term start	Term end
Presidency of the Council of Ministers	Zenón Noriega Agüero	July 28, 1950	August 9, 1954
Presidency of the Council of Ministers	Roque Augusto Saldías Maninat	August 9, 1954	July 1956
Presidency of the Council of Ministers	Juan Mendoza Rodríguez	July 1956	July 28, 1956
Foreign Affairs	Federico Díaz Dulanto	October 31, 1948	June 2, 1949
Foreign Affairs	Ernesto Rodríguez Ventocilla	June 2, 1949	July 28, 1950
Foreign Affairs	Manuel Gallagher Canaval	July 28, 1950	August 4, 1952
Foreign Affairs	Ricardo Rivera Schreiber	August 4, 1952	August 11, 1954
Foreign Affairs	David Aguilar Cornejo	August 11, 1954	December 2, 1955
Foreign Affairs	Fernando Gamio Palacio	December 2, 1955	December 24, 1955
Foreign Affairs	Luis Edgardo Llosa	December 24, 1955	June 29, 1956
Foreign Affairs	Félix Huamán Izquierdo	June 29, 1956	July 28, 1956
Agriculture and Food	Carlos Miñano Mendocilla	December 2, 1948	May 31, 1949
Agriculture and Food	Alberto León Díaz	May 31, 1949	June 26, 1950
Agriculture and Food	Luis Dibós Dammert	June 26, 1950	August 4, 1952
Agriculture and Food	José Alberto León Fontenoy	August 5, 1952	August 9, 1954
Agriculture and Food	Jaime Miranda Sousa	August 9, 1954	December 3, 1955
Agriculture and Food	Emilio Foley Gatjens	December 5, 1955	December 25, 1955
Agriculture and Food	Carlos Siles Beroni	December 26, 1955	July 28, 1956
Labour and Indian Affairs	Armando Artola del Pozo	May 31, 1949	August 9, 1954
Labour and Indian Affairs	Víctor Casagrande Velezmoro	August 9, 1954	September 15, 1955
Labour and Indian Affairs	Carlos D'Ugard Murgado	September 15, 1955	December 24, 1955
Labour and Indian Affairs	Augusto Romero Lovo	December 24, 1955	July 28, 1956
Public Health and Social Assistance	Alberto Flores López	May 31, 1949	July 28, 1950
Public Health and Social Assistance	Edgardo Rebagliati Martins	July 28, 1950	August 4, 1952
Public Health and Social Assistance	Luis N. Sáenz	August 5, 1952	August 9, 1954
Public Health and Social Assistance	Armando Montes de Peralta	August 9, 1954	September 14, 1955
Public Health and Social Assistance	Jorge de Romaña Plazolles	September 15, 1955	December 5, 1955
Public Health and Social Assistance	Alberto López Flores	December 5, 1955	July 28, 1956
Finance and Commerce	Luis Ramírez Ortiz	October 27, 1948	October 27, 1949
Finance and Commerce	Emilio Pereyra Marquina	October 27, 1949	July 28, 1950
Finance and Commerce	Andrés F. Dasso	July 28, 1950	September 1, 1952
Finance and Commerce	Emilio Romero Padilla	September 1, 1952	February 2, 1954
Finance and Commerce	Emilio Guimoye	February 2, 1954	December 9, 1955
Finance and Commerce	Jaime Miranda Sousa	December 9, 1955	December 24, 1955
Finance and Commerce	Roque Augusto Saldías Maninat	December 24, 1955	July 28, 1956
Justice and Worship	Marcial Merino	October 31, 1948	June 13, 1949
Justice and Worship	Armando Artola del Pozo	June 13, 1949	October 29, 1949
Justice and Worship	Augusto Romero Lovo	October 29, 1949	July 28, 1950
Justice and Worship	Alberto Freundt Rosell	July 28, 1950	August 5, 1952
Justice and Worship	Alejandro Freundt Rosell	August 5, 1952	December 24, 1955
Justice and Worship	Félix Huamán Izquierdo	December 24, 1955	July 28, 1956
Public Education	Juan Mendoza Rodríguez	November 1, 1948	December 18, 1952
Public Education	Alfonso Balaguer Regalado	December 18, 1952	January 29, 1954
Public Education	Carlos González Iglesias	January 29, 1954	September 15, 1955
Public Education	Carlos Rodríguez Pastor	September 15, 1955	December 2, 1955
Public Education	Mariano Iberico Rodríguez	December 2, 1955	December 24, 1955
Public Education	Juan Mendoza Rodríguez	December 24, 1955	July 28, 1956
Development and Public Works	Alfonso Llosa	November 3, 1948	July 28, 1950
Development and Public Works	José Cabrejo Mejía	July 28, 1950	1951
Development and Public Works	Carlos Salazar Southwell	1951	August 4, 1952
Development and Public Works	Eduardo Miranda Sousa	August 5, 1952	July 26, 1954
Development and Public Works	Fernando Noriega Calmet	July 26, 1954	December 24, 1955
Development and Public Works	Roberto Dianderas	December 24, 1955	July 28, 1956
Government and Police	Augusto Villacorta Álvarez	November 3, 1948	July 28, 1950
Government and Police	Ricardo de la Puente y Ganoza	July 28, 1950	March 20, 1952
Government and Police	Augusto Romero Lovo	March 20, 1952	September 16, 1955
Government and Police	Alejandro Esparza Zañartu	September 16, 1955	December 24, 1955
Government and Police	Augusto Villacorta Álvarez	December 24, 1955	July 28, 1956
Aeronautics	Ergasto Silva Guillén	February 27, 1947	June 1, 1949
Aeronautics	José Villanueva Pinillos	June 1, 1949	July 25, 1951
Aeronautics	Mario Saona	July 25, 1951	February 1, 1954
Aeronautics	Enrique Bernales Bedoya	February 1, 1954	January 1, 1956
Aeronautics	Manuel Polidoro García Mejía	January 1, 1956	July 28, 1956
Navy	Roque Augusto Saldías Maninat	November 2, 1948	December 24, 1955
Navy	Alfredo Sousa Almandoz	December 24, 1955	July 28, 1956
War	Zenón Noriega Agüero	November 2, 1948	August 9, 1954
War	Carlos Miñano Mendocilla	August 10, 1954	September 15, 1955
War	Enrique Indacochea Galarreta	September 15, 1955	July 28, 1956

== See also ==
- History of Peru
- Centralism (Peru)
- Women's suffrage in Peru

== Bibliography ==
- Chirinos Soto, Enrique (1985). Historia de la República. 1930–1985 (in Spanish). Vol. II. Desde Sánchez Cerro hasta Alan García. Lima: AFA Editores.
- Collier, David (1978). Barriadas y élites: de Odría a Velasco (in Spanish). Lima: Instituto de Estudios Peruanos.
- General Manuel A. Odría. Soldado y Gobernante (in Spanish). Lima: Imprenta Editora Popular, Comisión Nacional del Centenario del Nacimiento del expresidente Constitucional de la República General de División Manuel A. Odría. 1996.
- Contreras, Carlos; Cueto, Marcos (2004). Historia del Perú contemporáneo (in Spanish) (3rd ed.). Lima: Instituto de Estudios Peruanos.
- Guerra, Margarita (1984). Historia General del Perú (in Spanish). Vol. XII. La República Contemporánea (1919-1950) (1st ed.). Lima: Editorial Milla Batres. ISBN 84-499-4818-5.
- López Martínez, Héctor (2010). Historia del Perú. Vol. XII: La República Contemporánea (1933-2010). Empresa Editora El Comercio S.A. ISBN 978-612-4069-98-7.
- Pease, Henry; Romero, Gonzalo (2013). La política en el Perú del Siglo XX (1st ed.). Lima: Fondo Editorial de la Pontificia Universidad Católica del Perú.
- Portocarrero, Gonzalo (1983). De Bustamante a Odría. El fracaso del Frente Democrático Nacional (1st ed.). Lima: Mosca Azul editores.
- Portocarrero Grados, Ricardo (2000). Historia del Perú. Vol. El Perú Contemporáneo. Lima: Lexus Editores. ISBN 9972-625-35-4.
- Rivera Serna, Raúl (1975). Historia del Perú. República 1822-1968 (2nd ed.). Lima: Editorial Jurídica.
- Rodríguez Beruff, Jorge (1983). Los militares y el poder. Un ensayo sobre la doctrina militar en el Perú: 1948–1968. Translated by de Arregui, Patricia. Lima: Mosca Azul Editores.
- Tauro del Pino, Alberto (2001). Enciclopedia Ilustrada del Perú. Vol. 11. MEN/OJE (3rd ed.). Lima: PEISA. ISBN 9972401499.
- Castañeda Murga, Juan (2000). Grandes Forjadores del Perú. Lima: Lexus Editores. ISBN 9972-625-50-8.
