= Women's suffrage in Peru =

Women's suffrage in Peru was introduced on communal level in 1932 and on national level on 7 September 1955. It was the second to last country in South America to introduce women's suffrage.

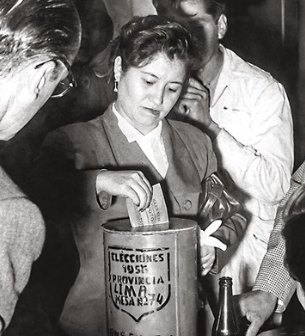
A Peruvian woman voting in 1956.

The issue was first suggested by senator Celso Bambaren Ramírez in 1867. In the early 20th century, the issue was beginning to be raised in public debate by pioneering women's activists such as Maria Jesus Alvarado, Zoila Aurora Cáceres, Adela Montesinos, Elvira Garcia y Garcia and Magda Portal, and Maria Jesus Alvarado was the first Peruvian woman to support women's suffrage in public in 1911.

The Parliament first took up the issue in 1931–1932, a debate which ended in a compromise, in which communal suffrage was introduced. Women's suffrage on a national level was introduced by the government of Manuel A. Odría in 1955. The reason was reportedly that he wished the support of women voters in the upcoming election of 1956.

== The first Peruvian women parliamentarians ==
The 1956 elections concluded with the election of Manuel Prado Ugarteche as President of the Republic and the election of one hundred and eighty-two deputies, eight of whom were women, and fifty-three senators, one of whom was a woman, Irene Silva de Santolalla. For these elections, 28 female candidates ran for Deputy and two for Senator.

The first parliamentary body of women in Peru was the following:

•Irene Silva de Santolalla - Senator for Cajamarca.

•Lola Blanco Montesinos - Deputy for Áncash.

•Alicia Blanco Montesinos - Deputy for Junín.

•María Eleonora Silva y Silva - Deputy for Junín.

•María M. Colina Lozano - Deputy for La Libertad.

•Manuela C. Billinghurst López - Deputy for Lima.

•Matilde Pérez Palacio Carranza - Deputy for Lima.

•Juana M. Ubilluz de Palacios - Deputy for Loreto.

•Carlota Ramos de Santolaya - Deputy for Piura.
