= Frente Democrático Nacional =

Frente Democrático Nacional may refer to:

- National Democratic Front (Mexico)
- National Democratic Front (Peru)
