= Ernesto Montagne Markholz =

Peruvian politician and military officer

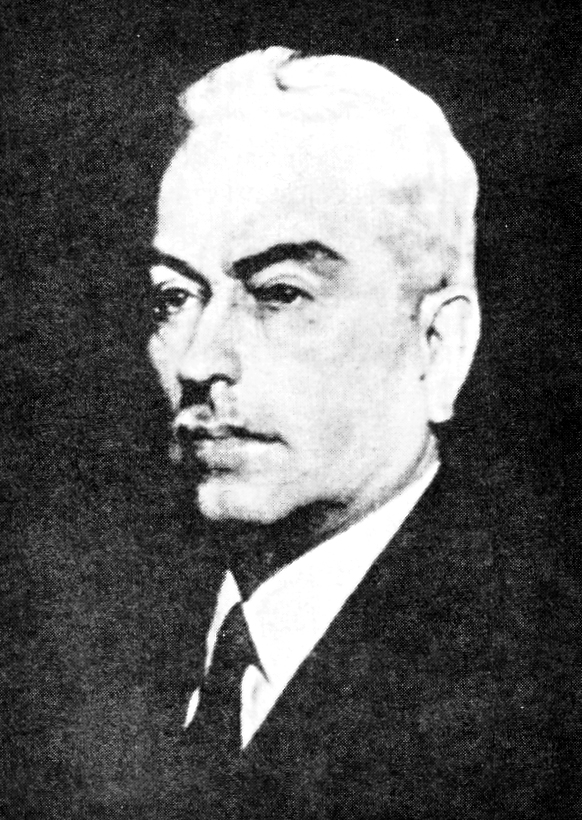
Ernesto Montagne Markholz

Ernesto Montagne Markholz (May 3, 1885 – August 27, 1954) was a Peruvian military officer, diplomat, and politician. He was Minister of Foreign Affairs in the cabinet of Lieutenant Colonel Luis Sánchez Cerro (1930–1931). In the second government of Óscar R. Benavides, he served as Minister of Justice, Instruction, Worship and Charity (1934–1935), Minister of Public Education (1935–1939) and President of the Council of Ministers (1936–1939). He was also a senator of the Republic (1939–1948) and President of the Senate (1939–1941).

In 1950, Ernesto wanted to compete against General Manuel A. Odría in the presidential election, but he was arrested and exiled. He was the father of Ernesto Montagne Sánchez, who, like his father, was also a military officer and politician, who became Prime Minister of Peru in the government of General Juan Velasco Alvarado.

== Biography ==
He was born to Adhemar Montagne Crepin, who was of French descent and María Eugenia Markholz Walsh, who was of German descent. He studied at the Licentico cientifico, at the Colegio Aleman, Colegio San José de Cluny (1889) and then at the Technical School of Commerce (1900).

He entered the Military School of Chorrillos in 1902 and obtained the sword of honor after his graduation and the rank of ensign in 1905. He specialized in Topography (1906–1908). After being promoted to lieutenant in 1908, he became a professor of Topography at the Military School (1908–1911). While serving as a captain, he entered the Superior War College (1911–1912). Due to his merits, he was sent to the Paris Higher War College (1913–1914) but returned at the outbreak of the First World War.

In 1909, in the chapel of the House of Armies, he married Raquel Sánchez-Benavides La Rosa, with whom he had seven children, including General Ernesto Montagne Sánchez.

Promoted to sergeant major in 1915, he was assigned as an adjunct to the Infantry and Shooting Inspectorate. In 1918, he was promoted to the rank of lieutenant colonel and was appointed head of a section in the General Staff of the Army; but shortly afterwards he was transferred to the Military School to take charge of his subdirectorate.

When the coup d'état of Augusto Leguía took place on July 4, 1919, he requested to be withdrawn. But soon he accepted appointment at the General Directorate of National Shooting, and then, the headquarters of the Infantry Regiment No. 15 which was organized in Sicuani . Ernesto was noted for the vigour he demonstrated while serving these posts.

He returned to Lima in 1922 as deputy to General Wilhelm Faupel, a German officer who had been appointed Inspector General of the Army. Promoted to colonel in 1928, he was again appointed deputy director of the Military School in 1929. When Leguía was overthrown, he did not recognize the cabinet formed in Lima headed by General Ponce, on August 24, 1930, and rather supported the putsch led in Arequipa by Lieutenant Colonel Luis Miguel Sánchez Cerro. Cerro immediately moved to Lima on the 27th of August and organized a new Government Junta, in which Ernesto Montagne was appointed as Minister of Foreign Relations. He held that position until February of the following year and later went to serve as the Comptroller General of the Army.

When the conflict with Colombia broke out as a result of the occupation of Leticia by a group of Peruvians who were discontent with the Solomon-Lozano Treaty, Montagne was transferred to Iquitos as chief of staff of the Army foe Operations of the North-East in 1933. He remained there for two years and returned to Lima in 1935.

At that time, General Oscar R. Benavides was ruling the country. Ernesto was appointed Minister of Justice and Worship on 21 May 1935 and then became head of the newly created portfolio of Education in October 1935. Following the resignation of President of the Council of Ministers Manuel E. Rodriguez, he replaced him as prime minister from April 13, 1936 to April 12, 1939). He simultaneously held the first vice presidency of the Republic. He was promoted to brigadier general on June 3, 1936. During the period, general elections were held on October 11, 1936, which were annulled, and Benavides' mandate was extended for another three years.

Initially, his cabinet was predominantly filled with Army officers, Later, from October 1937, important civilian figures joined him, such as Dr. Carlos Concha (Foreign Relations), Benjamín Roca (Finance and Commerce) and Rafael Escardó (Public Health, Works and Social Welfare). In December 1938, Manuel Ugarteche replaced Roca, and Dr. Guillermo Almenara replaced Escardó.

After the coup attempt by General Antonio Ramirez Rodríguez (who was a government minister) and the government's subsequent announcement to call general elections, the Montagne cabinet resigned on March 29, 1939, but his resignation was not accepted. He again requested it in April and then President Benavides oversaw the formation of another cabinet, headed by Manuel Ugarteche Jiménez, what was the last government of Benavides era.

Montagne was elected senator from Loreto (1939–1945), and became President of the Senate for two terms (1939–1941). While serving in the post, he had to receive the presidential sash from the hands of Benavides and place it on the new president, Manuel Prado Ugarteche, at the ceremony of handover of presidency on December 8, 1939.

Once again elected senator from Loreto in 1945, he supported President José Luis Bustamante y Rivero and, together with lawmakers of the National Democratic Front, tried to contain and mitigate the opposition, APRA.

The Bustamante government was overthrown after the coup d'état of General Manuel A. Odría on October 27, 1948, who formed a Military Junta and called for presidential elections in 1950. Odría would be the candidate, but there was a problem: according to the constitution, an incumbent president can not be candidate in presidential elections, for which he had to resign at least six months prior to the elections. Odría then implemented his famous "descent to the plain": with barely a month to go before the elections, he left power to General Zenón Noriega (June 1950). The opposition, united into the National Democratic League, in turn nominated General Ernesto Montagne as the candidate. But the National Electoral court rejected his registration on June 11, 1950; the next day the deadly Arequipa rebellion broke out. The government blamed the National Democratic League for the revolt and Montagne was arrested under various pretexts, although he was released after two weeks. The Military Junta then decided to deport General Montagne to Argentina, asking him to request it in writing, a request that they did not obtain. So the alleged extradition was never carried out. Odría as the sole candidate in that election, which was regarded as a farce.

Retired to private life, General Montagne died a few years later, in 1954.

== Bibliography ==
- El Mariscal Benavides, su vida y su obra. Volume II. Lima, Editorial Atlántida, 1981.
- Basadre, Jorge: Historia de la República del Perú. 1822 – 1933, Eifhth Edition, amended and expanded. Volume 12. Edited by the newspaper "La República" of Lima and the University of "Ricardo Palma". Published in Santiago, Chile, 1998.
- Guerra, Margarita: Historia General del Perú. Voulne XII. La República Contemporánea (1919–1950). First Edition. Editorial Milla Batres. Lima, Perú, 1984.
- Tauro del Pino, Alberto: Enciclopedia Ilustrada del Perú. Third Edition. Volume 11, MEN/OJE. Lima, PEISA, 2001. ISBN 9972-40-160-9
