= 1948 Peruvian coup d'état =

1948 coup d'état in Peru

- Part of the presidency of Manuel Odría
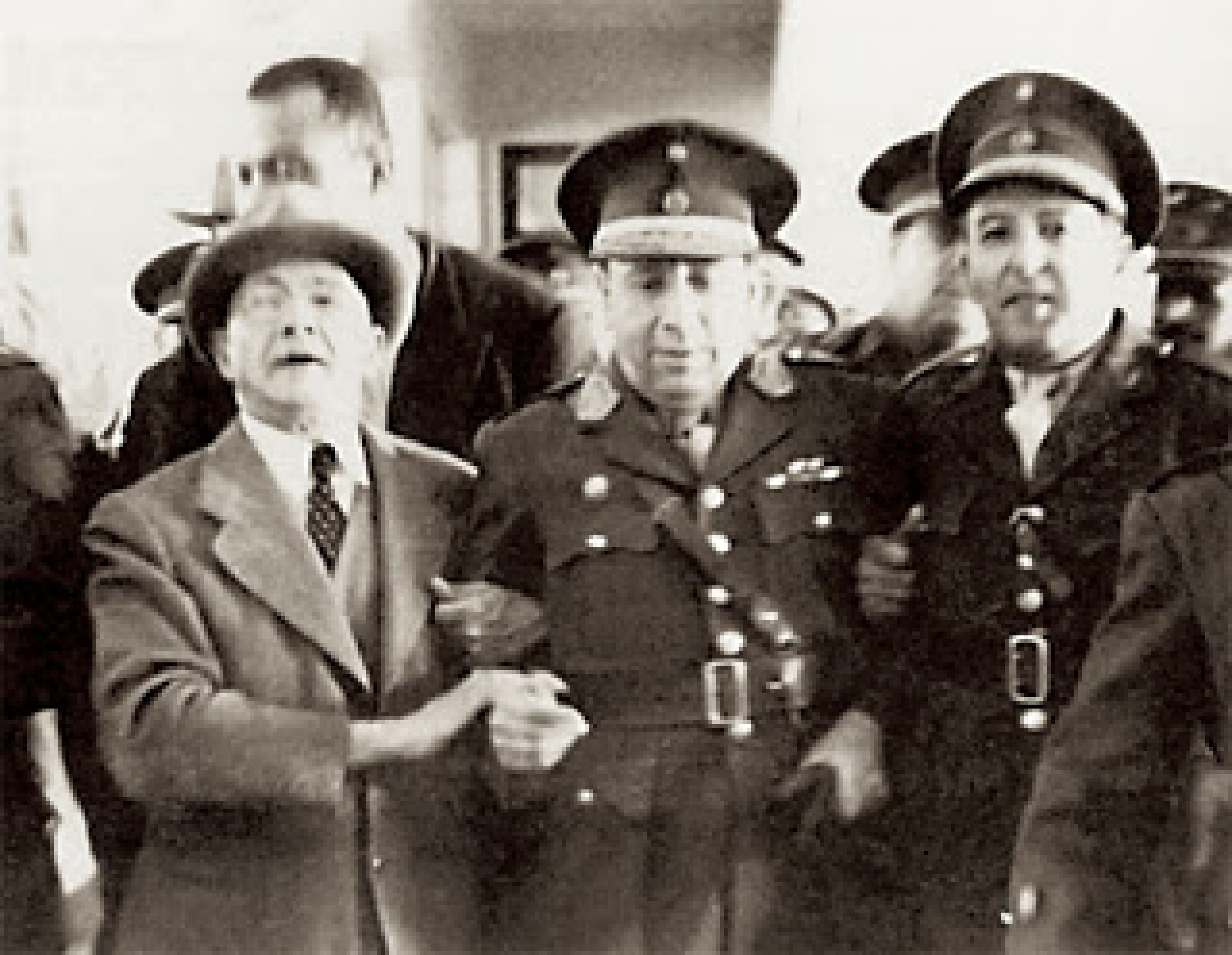
- Odría after the coup
Date	27 October 1948
Location	Arequipa and Lima, Peru
Result	Army victory: Overthrow of Bustamante; Manuel A. Odría becomes president

Belligerents
Government of Peru	Peruvian Army

Commanders and leaders
José L. Bustamante	Manuel A. Odría; Zenón Noriega

The 1948 Peruvian coup d'état took place on October 27, 1948, headed by general Manuel A. Odría in Arequipa, referred to by him as the "Restorative Revolution" (Spanish: Revolución Restauradora), against the government of José Luis Bustamante y Rivero. Odría seized power.

The military coup gave way to a period of almost twenty months in which the deposed president was prosecuted, a state of emergency was declared throughout the country, and the national congress was dissolved.

== Background ==
José Luis Bustamante y Rivero became the president of Peru in the 1945 elections with the support of the National Democratic Front, an alliance of parties including APRA (under the name "People's Party"), the Peruvian Communist Party, and other democratic and left-leaning parties. He also had the support of unionists and the popular classes.

Bustamante's government had to face difficult political and social situations, such as the predominance of APRA in Congress and the subsequent confrontation between executive and legislative, and the murder allegedly at the hands of Apristas of the director of the newspaper La Prensa, Francisco Graña Garland. The disagreements between the conservative and military sectors with the government due to the refusal to distance itself from APRA caused the crisis to escalate until the resignation of the cabinet chaired by Julio Ernesto Portugal.

The turning point for the export oligarchy and the anti-APRA sectors to begin the path to taking power through a coup d'état occurred on October 3, 1948, with the uprising of the sailors in Callao, encouraged by the APRA and related soldiers.

== Coup ==
On October 27, 1948, Manuel A. Odría, who had been Minister of Government and Police in the Bustamante y Rivero government, revolted at the head of the Arequipa garrison. He called his subversive act the "Restorative Revolution." A visibly nervous Odría read his Manifesto to the Nation on Radio Continental, in which he declared the following:

The revolution that broke out in Arequipa is for a just, noble and patriotic cause: to save the armed institutes that are the basis of national defence; rebuild democratic life, reestablish the rule of the Constitution and, finally, end the period of misery and hunger that overwhelms our people.

— Manuel A. Odría

The other garrisons in the country, such as Cuzco and those in the north of the country, hesitated to join the movement initiated in Arequipa, but its triumph was decided when the garrison at Lima, under the command of General Zenón Noriega, joined Odría. The coup d'état culminated successfully with the deportation of President Bustamante to Buenos Aires. Noriega assumed interim power, as President of the Military Junta, until the arrival of Odría on October 29, 1948.

== See also ==
- History of Peru (1948–1956)
