= 1956 Peruvian general election =

- 17 June 1956
- Presidential election
- Turnout: 84.04%
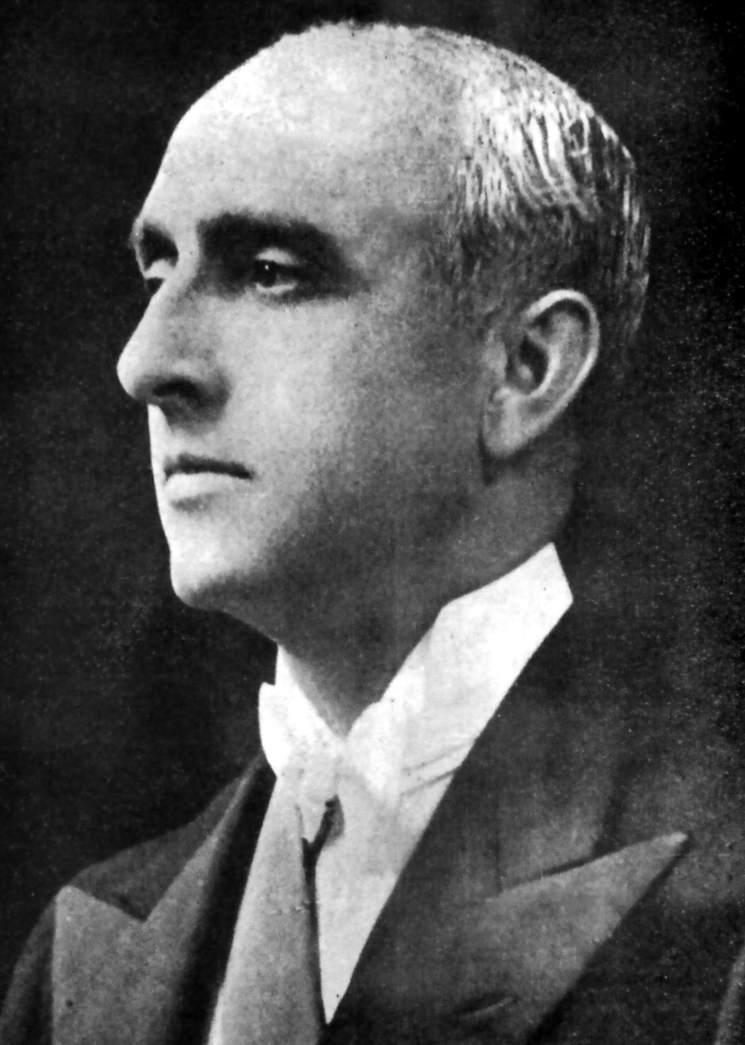

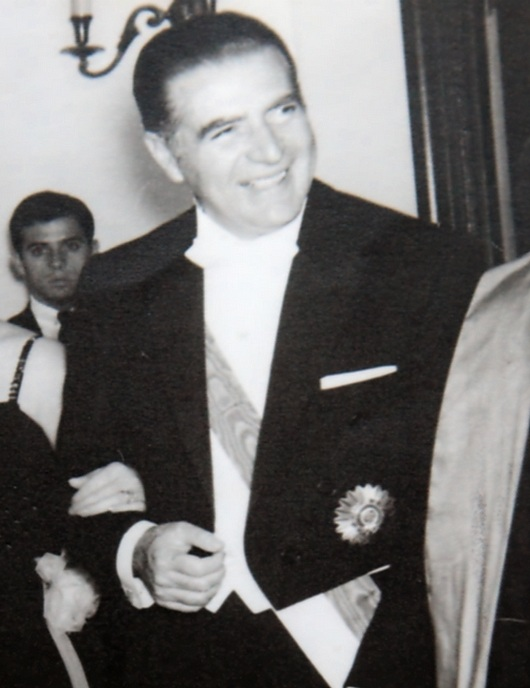

| Nominee | Manuel Prado Ugarteche | Fernando Belaúnde Terry | Hernando de Lavalle y García |
| Party | MDP | FJD | UN–CD |
| Popular vote | 567,713 | 457,966 | 222,619 |
| Percentage | 45.48% | 36.69% | 17.83% |
President before election
Manuel A. Odría
Restoration Party
Elected President
Manuel Prado Ugarteche
MDP

General elections were held in Peru on 17 June 1956 to elect the President and both houses of the Congress. Incumbent President Manuel A. Odría, who had seized dictatorial powers, was pressured to call the 1956 elections.

Manuel Prado Ugarteche of the Pradist Democratic Movement won the presidential election with 45.5% of the vote. They were the first elections in Peru in which women could vote, and nine women were elected to Congress; Manuela Billinghurst, Alicia Blanco Montesinos, Lola Blanco Montesinos, María Colina Lozano, Matilde Pérez Palacio, Carlota Ramos de Santolaya, María Eleonora Silva Silva and Juana Ubilluz de Palacios were elected to the Chamber of Deputies, while Irene Silva de Santolalla became the first woman elected to the Senate.

Incumbent President Odría favored Hernando de Lavalle y Garcia.

== Results ==
=== President ===
| Candidate | Party | Votes | % |
|---|---|---|---|
| Manuel Prado Ugarteche | Pradist Democratic Movement | 567,713 | 45.48 |
| Fernando Belaúnde Terry | Democratic Youth Front | 457,966 | 36.69 |
| Hernando de Lavalle y García | National Unity–Democratic Concordance | 222,619 | 17.83 |
| Total | | 1,248,298 | 100.00 |
| Valid votes | | 1,248,298 | 94.27 |
| Invalid/blank votes | | 75,931 | 5.73 |
| Total votes | | 1,324,229 | 100.00 |
| Registered voters/turnout | | 1,575,741 | 84.04 |
Source: Nohlen

=== Senate ===
| Party | Seats |
|---|---|
| Pradist Democratic Movement | 24 |
| National Unification | 8 |
| José Gálvez list | 6 |
| Democratic Youth Front | 5 |
| Augusto Guzmán list | 2 |
| Rodrigo Alonso list | 2 |
| Luis González list | 2 |
| Christian Democrat Party | 2 |
| Wilson Sologuren list | 1 |
| Edgardo Portaro list | 1 |
| Total | 53 |
Source: JNE

=== Chamber of Deputies ===
| Party | Seats |
|---|---|
| Pradist Democratic Movement | 64 |
| National Unification | 41 |
| Democratic Youth Front | 21 |
| José Gálvez list | 15 |
| Augusto Guzmán list | 12 |
| Rodrigo Alonso list | 8 |
| Luis González list | 8 |
| Christian Democrat Party | 5 |
| Wilson Sologuren list | 3 |
| Edgardo Portaro list | 1 |
| Cuzqueña Democratic Alliance | 1 |
| Ayacuchano Electoral Front | 1 |
| Juan Lozno list | 1 |
| Independent Civic Union | 1 |
| Total | 182 |
Source: JNE
