= 1945 Peruvian general election =

- 10 June 1945
- Presidential election
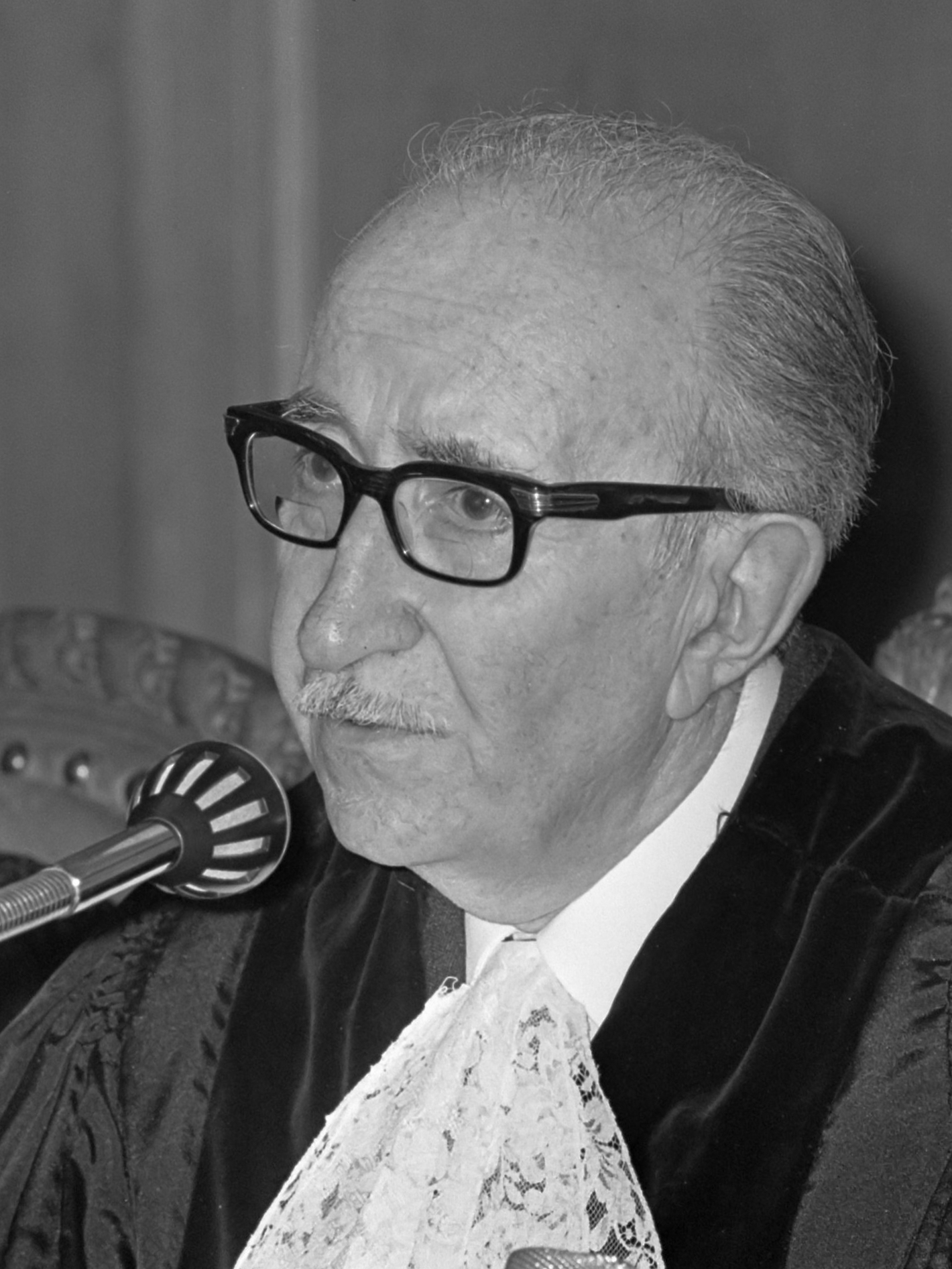

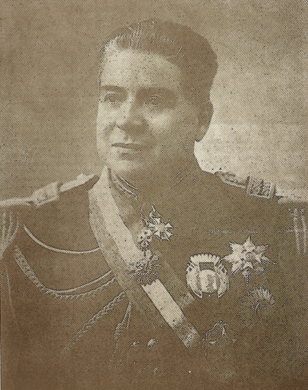
| Nominee | José Luis Bustamante y Rivero | Eloy G. Ureta |
| Party | FDN | Revolutionary Union |
| Popular vote | 305,590 | 150,720 |
| Percentage | 66.97% | 33.03% |
President before election
Manuel Prado Ugarteche
Concentración Nacional
Elected President
José Luis Bustamante y Rivero
FDN

General elections were held in Peru on 10 June 1945 to elect the President and both houses of Congress. In the presidential elections the result was a victory for José Luis Bustamante y Rivero of the National Democratic Front (FDN), who received 67% of the vote. The FDN also emerged as the largest party in both houses of Congress, winning 35 of the 49 seats in the Senate and 73 of the 153 seats in the Chamber of Deputies.

== Results ==
=== President ===
| Candidate | Party | Votes | % |
|---|---|---|---|
| José Luis Bustamante y Rivero | National Democratic Front | 305,590 | 66.97 |
| Eloy G. Ureta | Revolutionary Union | 150,720 | 33.03 |
| Total | | 456,310 | 100.00 |
| Registered voters/turnout | | 776,572 | – |
Source: Nohlen

=== Senate ===
| Party | Seats | +/– |
|---|---|---|
| National Democratic Front | 35 | New |
| Revolutionary Union | 4 | +4 |
| Socialist Party of Peru | 4 | New |
| Unidentified | 5 | – |
| Independents | 1 | New |
| Total | 49 | +1 |
Source: JNE

=== Chamber of Deputies ===
| Party | Seats | +/– |
|---|---|---|
| National Democratic Front | 73 | New |
| Revolutionary Union | 29 | +28 |
| Socialist Party of Peru | 3 | New |
| Unidentified | 9 | – |
| Independents | 39 | +34 |
| Total | 153 | +13 |
Source: JNE
