= Roque Augusto Saldías Maninat =

Venezuelan-born Peruvian admiral and politician

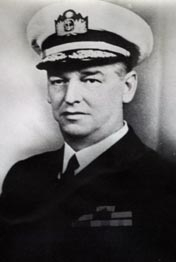

Roque Augusto Saldías Maninat (May 5, 1892 – May 17, 1974) was a Venezuelan-born Peruvian admiral and politician. He was born in Valencia, Carabobo, Venezuela. He returned to Peru with his family in 1895. In 1908, he enrolled at the Naval Academy of Peru and graduated in 1912. He went to France on the cruiser Comandante Aguirre and returned to Peru in 1915. He later served on the cruiser Almirante Grau. He was minister of health (1936–1937), navy and aviation (1937–1939), navy (1948–1955) and economy and finance (February–June 1948) in the Government of Peru. He served under Presidents Óscar Benavides, José Bustamante y Rivero and Manuel A. Odría. He eventually rose to the rank of vice admiral in the Peruvian Navy.

Preceded by Fortunato Quesada Larrea	Minister of Health of Peru; October 23, 1936 – October 29, 1937	Succeeded by Rafael Escardó
Preceded by Héctor F. Mercado Silva	Minister of Navy and Aviation; October 29, 1937 – December 8, 1939	Succeeded by Federico Díaz Dulanto
Preceded by José R. Alzamora Freundt	Prime Minister of Peru; February 27–June 17, 1948	Succeeded by Armando Revoredo Iglesias
Preceded by Mariano H. Melgar Conde	Minister of Navy of Peru; 1948–1955	Succeeded by Alfredo Souza Almandoz
Preceded by Luis Echecopar García	Minister of Economy and Finance; February 27–June 17, 1948	Succeeded by Manuel B. Llosa
Preceded by Zenón Noriega Agüero	Prime Minister of Peru; August 9, 1954 – July 28, 1956	Succeeded by Manuel Cisneros Sánchez
