= Edgardo Rebagliati =

Peruvian lawyer and journalist (1895–1958)

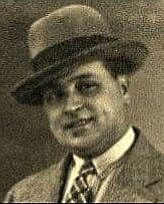
- Rebagliati in 1927

Minister of Public Health and Social Assistance
- In office July 28, 1950 – August 4, 1952
- President: Manuel A. Odría
- Preceded by: Alberto Flores López
- Succeeded by: Luis N. Sáenz

Personal details
- Born: Edgardo Rebagliati Martins; 1895 Huánuco, Peru
- Died: February 18, 1958 (aged 62–63) Lima, Peru

Edgardo Rebagliati Martins (1895 – February 18, 1958) was a Peruvian lawyer and journalist who was Minister of Public Health and Social Assistance during the government of Manuel A. Odría (1950–52). He is considered the inspirer and achiever of social security in his country. In his memory, the former Employee Hospital in Lima was renamed after him.
