= Óscar R. Benavides =

President of Peru from 1933 to 1939

Óscar Raymundo Benavides Larrea
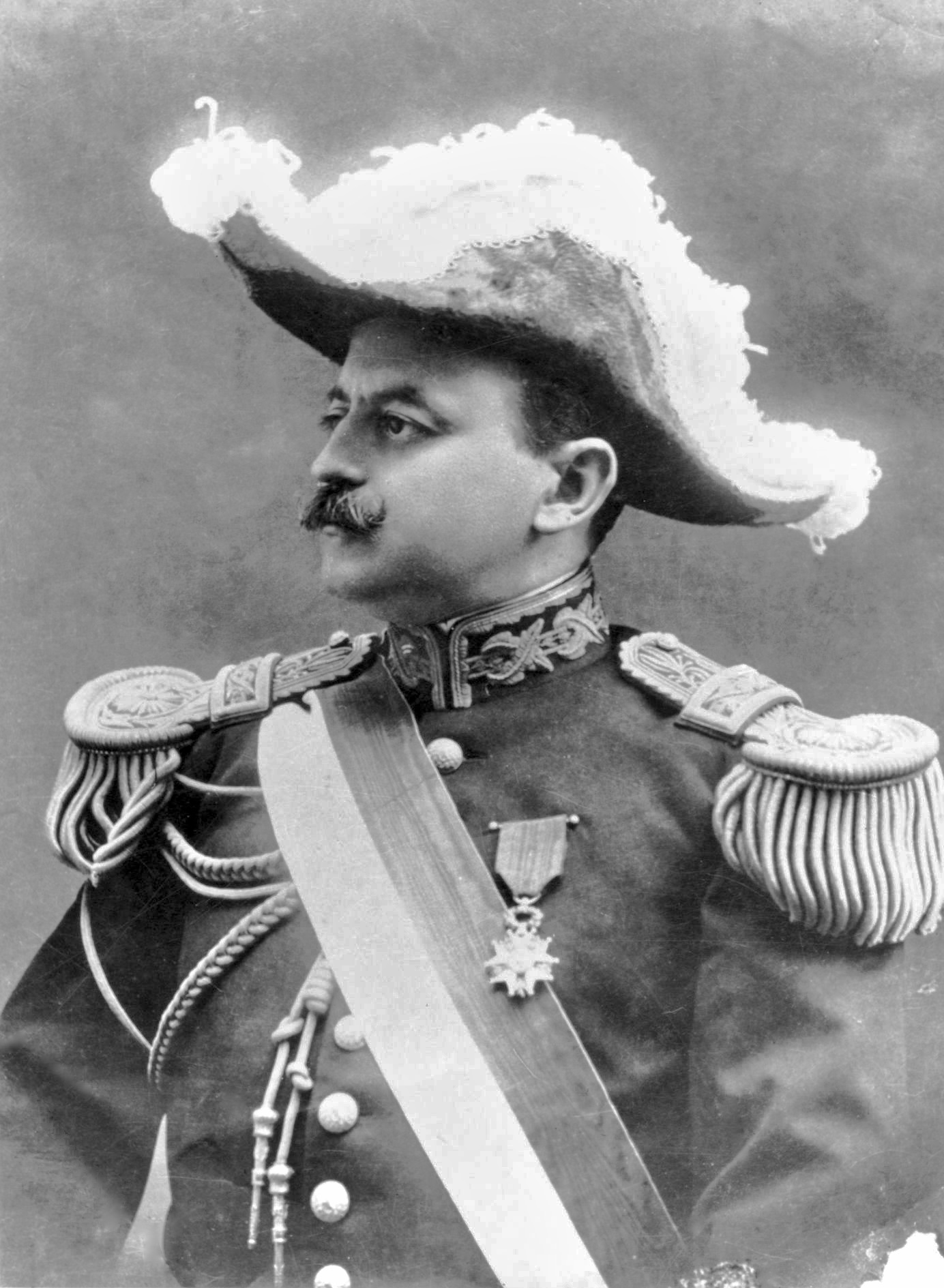
- Benavides in 1933

President of Peru
- In office April 30, 1933 – December 8, 1939
- Prime Minister: See list: José Matías Manzanilla; Jorge Prado y Ugarteche; José de la Riva-Agüero; Alberto Rey de Castro; Carlos Arenas y Loayza; Manuel E. Rodríguez; Ernesto Montagne Markholz
- Vice President: Ernesto Montagne Markholz; Antonio Rodríguez Ramírez
- Preceded by: Luis Miguel Sánchez Cerro
- Succeeded by: Manuel Prado Ugarteche

President of the Government Junta of Peru
- In office February 4, 1914 – August 18, 1915
- Prime Minister: See list: Pedro Muñiz Sevilla; Melitón Carvajal; Aurelio Sousa Matute; Germán Schreiber
- Preceded by: Guillermo Billinghurst
- Succeeded by: José Pardo y Barreda

Personal details
- Born: March 15, 1876 Lima, Peru
- Died: July 2, 1945 (aged 69) Lima, Peru
- Party: National Democratic Front
- Spouse: Francisca Benavides Diez Canseco

Military service
- Allegiance: Peru
- Branch/service: Peruvian Army
- Years of service: 1894–1939
- Rank: Grand marshal

Óscar Raymundo Benavides Larrea (March 15, 1876 – July 2, 1945) was a Peruvian field marshal, diplomat, and politician who served as the 38th (via a coup d'état) and 42nd President of Peru, with his latter term (1933–1939) being a period of authoritarianism.

In 1911, he commanded Peruvian forces in the Battle of La Pedrera against Colombia where Peru was victorious. Later, during his second presidency, he annulled the 1936 Peruvian general election, where his favored candidate Jorge Prado y Ugarteche appeared to be losing, and subsequently stayed on as president.

== Early life ==
He was born in Lima on March 15, 1876, son of Miguel Benavides y Gallegos, Sergeant Major of the National Guard, and Erfilia Larrea, Peruvian socialite. After attending the College of Our Lady of Guadalupe in Lima, Benavides entered the Military School of Lima and in 1894 the Dos de Mayo Artillery Brigade. In 1901, he was promoted to captain. In 1906, at age 30, he graduated with top grades as Sergeant Major at the Military Academy in Lima, directed by the French Military Mission. Benavides went to France to complete his military training, after which the French Republic distinguished him with the Cross of the Legion of Honor.

== Military career ==
=== Caquetá River campaign ===
Upon returning to Peru in December 1910, Benavides was designated commanding officer of Infantry Battalion N° 9, garrisoned in Chiclayo, on the Northern Pacific Coast of Peru. In February 1911, the Peruvian Government ordered Benavides to lead Battalion Nº 9 to the Northeastern border with Colombia in the Peruvian Amazon. Colombia had established a fortified post at La Pedrera on the southern bank of the Caquetá River, which, according to the Porras-Tanco Argáez Treaty of 1909, was within Peruvian territory.

Battalion N° 9 had to travel more than 2,000 kilometers, passing over the roadless Andean range at Cajamarca and Chachapoyas to the Amazonian jungle. At Balsapuerto, at the headwaters of the Huallaga River, the expedition prepared rafts and obtained canoes, traveling downstream to Yurimaguas on the Huallaga, and thence by boat to Iquitos on the Amazon River. The naval expedition, consisting of one gunboat and four boats, set out from Iquitos on June 29, 1911, four months after departing Chiclayo. On July 10 it faced La Pedrera with blazing flags. After an exchange of notes in which the Colombian Commander refused to vacate the position, Commander Benavides initiated the attack. The triumph of the Peruvian forces was complete. But on July 24, to his dismay, Commander Benavides was informed that the Peruvian and Colombian Governments had signed a treaty whereby the Peruvian forces were to abandon the Caquetá and to withdraw to the Putumayo River.

On July 28, 1911, the Peruvian forces still at La Pedrera celebrated Independence Day. But they lacked equipment to protect themselves from the climate, diseases, and infections endemic to the region. On July 29, the troops underwent a terrible epidemic of yellow fever and beriberi. Lacking medicines, the troops were cruelly decimated.

On August 4, Commander Benavides returned to Iquitos. He was promoted to the rank of Infantry Colonel; but Benavides wrote in his diary: "I have suffered so much that the victory obtained and the ovations and promotion conferred on me have not gratified me in the way many assume, as they would have without so much misfortune".

The Government sent Benavides to Europe for treatment of beriberi. When he returned to Peru on April 8, 1912, he was received as a national hero, and in his honor a parade took place in Lima, along the Jirón de la Unión to the Plaza de Armas. On this occasion, he met his distant cousin Francisca Benavides Diez Canseco, whom he married a few months later. Benavides was appointed to the position of General Commander of the Third Region in Arequipa. In November 1913, Benavides was designated Head of the Army General Staff in Lima.

On July 16, 1913, he was shot in the arm in a bandit attack on his troops. He was shot again on the same day by an ally's stray bullet. Neither of the wounds were fatal (or even near fatal), but they did diminish his fighting abilities.

== First presidency (1914–1915) and after ==
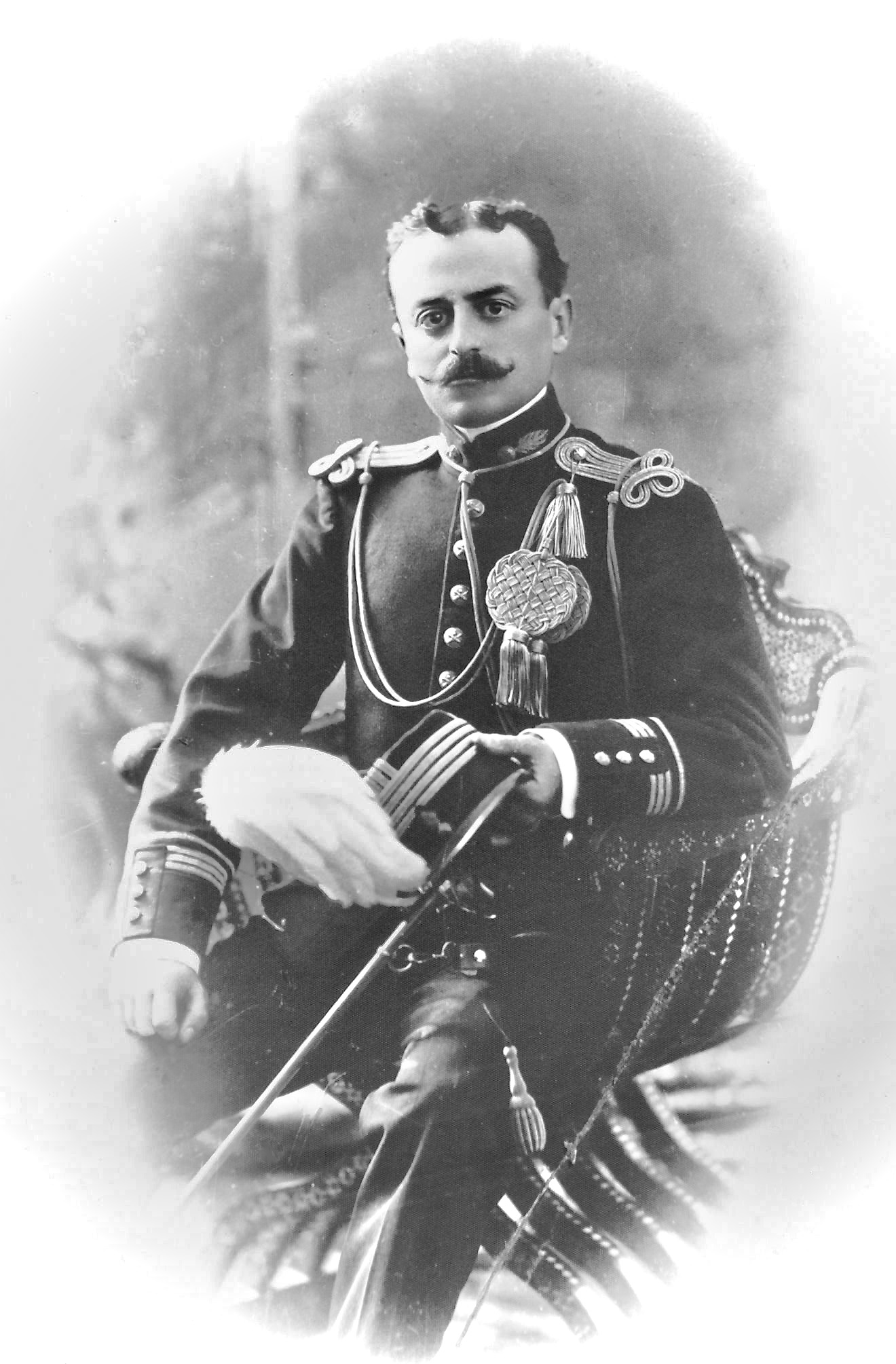
Benavides in 1914

In 1913, the President of Peru was Guillermo Billinghurst, who had been elected in 1912 with the backing of workers' movements. Faced with the opposition of a significant sector of Congress, Billinghurst planned to dissolve Congress. Some Congressmen conspired to depose the President, and obtained the backing of Lieutenant Colonel José Urdanivia Ginés, head of a section of the Army General Staff. Billinghurst attempted to arm the population to fight the Armed Forces. The conspirators approached Colonel Benavides, who agreed to back them, both to defend the Constitutional order and to avoid a division of the Armed Forces (Basadre, p. 3733–3734). On February 4, 1914, the Army, under the command of Benavides, obtained from President Billinghurst a statement of willingness to negotiate. Billinghurst was deposed and exiled to Chile, where he died the following year.

As Chief of Staff, Benavides was appointed by the conspirers to preside over a Government Council. On May 15, the National Congress designated him as Provisional President. On December 17, Benavides ascended to General of Brigade (Tauro, p. 285). During the 18 months of his government, Benavides restored political order and stability. Regarding his cabinets, Basadre (p. 3772) writes: "General Benavides's choice of collaborators was cautious and balanced". Benavides called general presidential elections which were won by José Pardo y Barreda, who governed from August 18, 1915.

President Pardo sent Benavides to Paris (1916) as an observer of World War I; he was a witness at the Battle of Verdun. Subsequently (1917), Pardo sent him to Italy as Extraordinary Emissary and Plenipotentiary Minister. On July 4, 1919, Augusto B. Leguía became President of Peru as the result of a coup d'état against Pardo. In December 1920, Benavides resigned from the post in Rome and returned to Lima.

Leguía feared that Benavides would organize a revolt, and had him arrested on May 3, 1921. Benavides and twenty-five other citizens were boarded as prisoners on the Paita steamship destined to Sydney, Australia. A revolt, commanded by Benavides, captured the ship's captain and officers, and changed the route to Costa Rica. From Costa Rica. Benavides moved to Panama and thence to Guayaquil (Ecuador) where he renewed contacts with elements opposing Leguia. In November 1927, he moved to France.

On August 22, 1930, Lieutenant Colonel Luis Miguel Sánchez Cerro initiated a coup in Arequipa, and Leguía resigned from the Presidency. Sánchez Cerro was invested with the rank of Provisional President. On October 3, Benavides was appointed to the post of Extraordinary Emissary and Plenipotentiary Minister in Spain and, in February 1932, in England. The Government recalled Benavides and appointed him General-in-Chief of the Council of National Defense (March 27, 1932), in charge of the Peruvian forces in view of a renewed armed conflict with Colombia. On March 31, he was promoted to the rank of Division General.

Sánchez Cerro was assassinated on April 30, 1933. To restrain ensuing turmoil, the Constituent Assembly proclaimed Benavides Constitutional President of the Republic for the completion of the period initiated by Sánchez Cerro. Benavides signed the new Peruvian Constitution, which replaced that of 1920 (which had been in effect since the administration of Augusto B. Leguía). The 1933 Constitution lasted until 1979.

== Second presidency (1933–1939) ==
Benavides oversaw an authoritarian regime, was sympathetic towards fascism and built a strong relationship with wealthy Peruvian business owners. The primary concerns of the new Government were: to resolve the conflict with Colombia (peace was negotiated in May 1934); and to resolve internal political agitation (Tauro, vol 1, p. 266; Orrego, p. 894) for which purpose, Benavides outlawed the Alianza Popular Revolucionaria Americana (APRA), arguing that it was an international party, prohibited by the Peruvian Constitution, and repressed the Communist Party for the same reason. Benavides called presidential elections in 1936; but the results were annulled as they favored the investment of Luis Antonio Eguiguren who, according to the Government, had the vote of the APRA.

Benavides obtained the extension of his mandate for three more years in 1936 after enacting authoritarian measures to maintain power. During this extension, he governed under the motto "Order, Peace, and Work." He strengthened the Armed Forces and purchased modern armaments. The Navy Dock and Ship Dry Dock of Callao were built; the Pan-American Highway was completed from Ecuador to Chile along the Peruvian coast, as was the Central Highway crossing the Andes east from Lima to the Amazonian Forest, as far as Tingo María. Road and bridge tolls were abolished, thus implementing freedom of the highways.

The Government instituted Workers' Social Security, built living quarters and dining halls for workers and their families, and a new Civil Code. Tourism was encouraged and Tourist Hotels were planned for Peru's principal cities. The National Census was planned and organized, but was only effected in 1940, by the following Government. During Benavides' term in office, the second phase of remodeling the Government Palace of Peru was initiated, as well as the Palacio de Justicia ("Palace of Justice"). In addition, a Supreme Resolution of February 1937 charged the labor authorities (as noted by one study) “to formulate a general plan for industrial hygiene and safety.”

On December 8, 1939, Benavides handed over the presidential mandate to Manuel Prado y Ugarteche, the winner of the General Elections of that year. On December 19, Prado honored Benavides with the title of Grand Marshal of Peru.

== Later life ==
Benavides served as Peruvian Ambassador in Madrid (1940), and in Buenos Aires (1941–1944). He returned to Peru on July 17, 1944, and was among the founders of the Frente Democrático Nacional (FDN) (National Democratic Front). Benavides died in Lima on July 2, 1945, after the confirmation of the triumph of the FDN Presidential Candidate, José Luis Bustamante y Rivero.

The quote "For my friends, everything; for my enemies, the law." (Spanish: Para mis amigos, todo; para mis enemigos, la ley) is often attributed to Benavides, although other sources also attribute it to other Latin American heads of state, such as Benito Juárez, Juan Perón, Getulio Vargas, or Juscelino Kubitschek.

== See also ==
- Third Militarism

Political offices
Preceded by Guillermo Billinghurst	President of Peru; 1914–1915	Succeeded by José Pardo y Barreda
Preceded by Luis Miguel Sánchez Cerro	President of Peru; 1933–1939	Succeeded by Manuel Prado y Ugarteche
