= 1950 Peruvian general election =

- 2 July 1950
- Presidential election
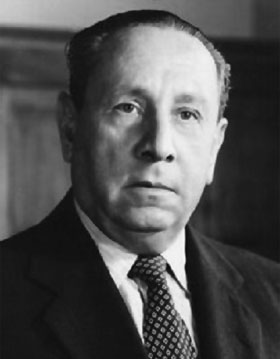
Nominee	Manuel A. Odría
Party	Restoration Party
Popular vote	550,779
Percentage	100%
President before election
Zenón Noriega Agüero
Military Junta
Elected President
Manuel Odría
Restoration Party

General elections were held in Peru on 2 July 1950 to elect the President and both houses of Congress. Manuel A. Odría was the only presidential candidate after the Junta Nacional Electoral invalidated Ernesto Montagne's (Democratic League) candidacy. He was elected unopposed.

In the Congressional elections, lists supporting Odría won 38 of the 47 seats in the Senate and 139 of the 156 seats in the Chamber of Deputies.

== Results ==
=== President ===
Candidate	Party	Votes	%
Manuel A. Odría	Restoration Party	550,779	100.00
Total		550,779	100.00
Source: Nohlen

=== Senate ===
Only 45 of the 47 seats in the Senate were filled as only one list of candidates was registered in Ancash and Puno, resulting in their minority seats being unfilled.

Party	Seats	+/–
Odriist lists	38	New
Socialist lists	1	–3
Independent lists	6	+5
Vacant	2	–
Total	47	–2
Source: JNE

=== Chamber of Deputies ===
Only 154 of the 156 seats in the Chamber were filled as only one list of candidates was registered in Ancash and Puno, resulting in their minority seats being unfilled.

Party	Seats	+/–
Odriist lists	139	New
Socialist lists	3	0
Independent lists	12	+6
Vacant	2	–
Total	156	+3
Source: JNE
