= Edgardo Rebagliati Martins National Hospital =

Hospital in Peru

Coordinates: 12.0781°S 77.0403°W

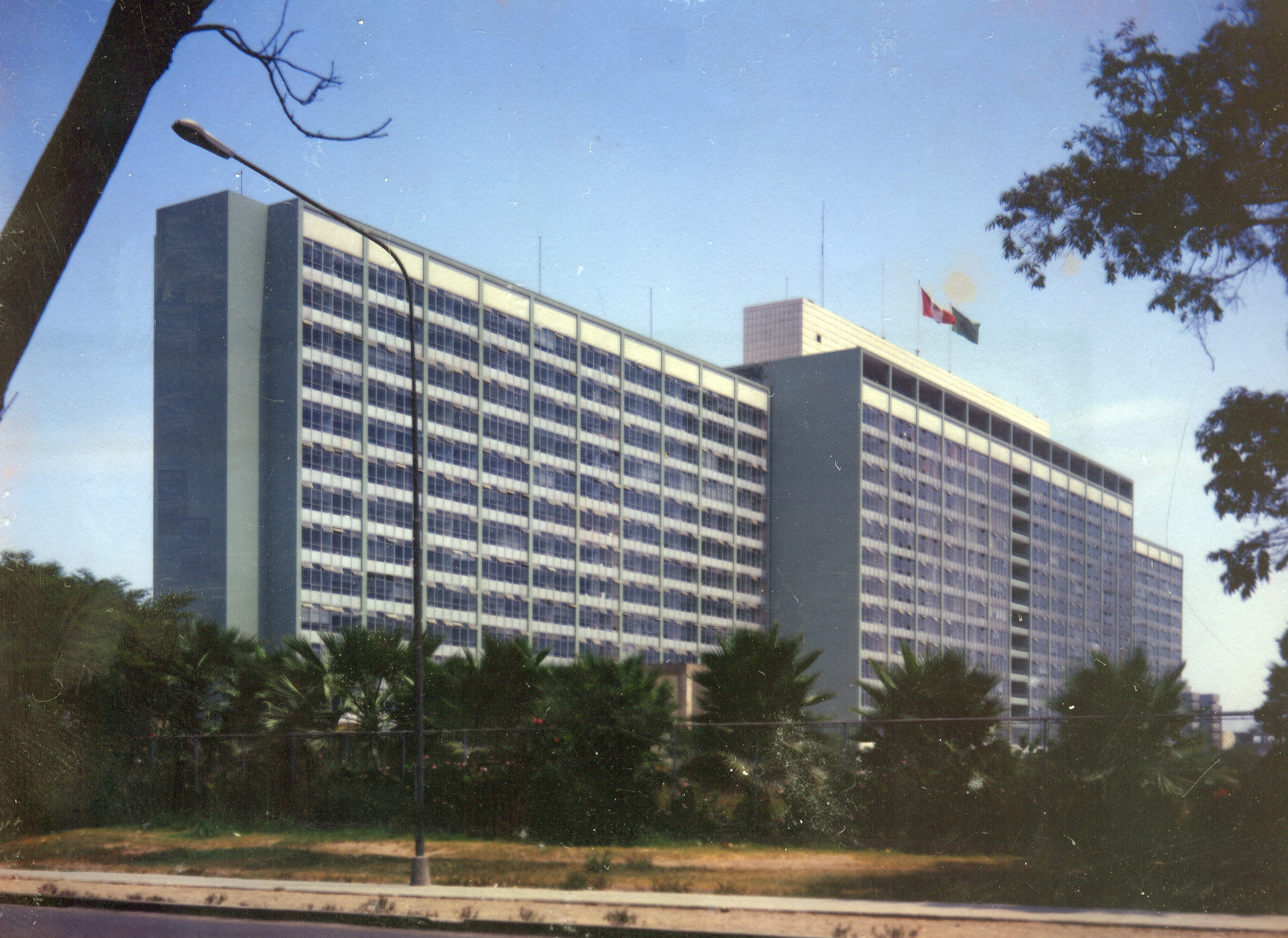

Geography
- Location: Jesús María District, Lima

Organisation
- Care system: EsSalud
- Type: Public hospital

Services
- Beds: 1,600

History
- Former names: Central Hospital, Employee Hospital
- Opened: November 3, 1958

Links
- Website: www.gob.pe/hnrebagliati

Edgardo Rebagliati Martins National Hospital (Spanish: Hospital Nacional Edgardo Rebagliati Martins), formerly known as the Central Hospital of Lima (Spanish: Hospital Central de Lima) and as the Employee Hospital (Spanish: Hospital del Empleado) is a Level IV (category III-1) public hospital in Jesús María District, Lima, Peru. Named after its promoter, Edgardo Rebagliati, it is the most important social security hospital complex in Peru.

== History ==
The construction project was born together with the creation of the Social Security of the Employee (Spanish: Seguro Social del Empleado) in 1948, under the government of General Manuel A. Odría. Its construction began in 1951, on land that had previously belonged to the University of San Marcos. Its original name was Employee Hospital. The work was promoted by Dr. Edgardo Rebagliati Martins, Minister of Public Health and Social Assistance, lawyer and great promoter of social security in his country.

The project was entrusted to the American architects Edward Durell Stone and Alfred Lewis Aydelott. More than 7,000 tons of iron, 800,000 bags of cement, 102,000 linear metres of pipe, 960,000 linear metres of wire and 25,400 units of light fixtures were used. The area it covered was 127,000 m^{2}.

Odría greatly appreciated this work and considered it one of the most representative of his government, so, even though it was not yet fully equipped, he organized an inauguration ceremony on July 24, 1956, four days before the end of his presidency.

The work was finally completed in 1958, already under the second government of Manuel Prado Ugarteche. On November 3 of that year, it was definitively inaugurated in a ceremony presided over by the Minister of Health, Francisco Sánchez Moreno. It then had 466 operational beds. Its first director was Dr. Guillermo Kaelin de la Puente (until 1968).

In 1975, it changed its name and was renamed Edgardo Rebagliati Martins, in homage to its promoter.

== See also ==
- Edgardo Rebagliati
- List of hospitals in Peru
