= Carlota Ramos de Santolaya =

Peruvian poet and politician

Member of the Chamber of Deputies
- In office 1956–1962
- Constituency: Piura

Personal details
- Born: 1910; Piura, Peru
- Died: 1994

Carlota Ramos de Santolaya (1910–1994) was a Peruvian poet and politician. In 1956 she was among the first group of women elected to Congress, serving until 1962.

== Biography ==
Ramos was born in Piura in 1910. She became a poet and entertainer, and was the first president of the Piura Artistic Literary Group.

After women gained the right to vote and stand as candidates, she contested the 1956 Chamber of Deputies elections as a Pradist Democratic Movement candidate in Piura, and was one of nine women elected to Congress. After entering parliament, she sat on the Social Assistance commission, the Women and Minors commission and the Worship commission. She remained a member of Congress until 1962 and later became mayor of Piura in 1976. She died in 1994.
