= Manuela Billinghurst =

Peruvian politician

Member of the Chamber of Deputies
- In office 1956–1962
- Constituency: Lima

Personal details
- Born: 1919; Lima, Peru
- Died: 5 May 1967; Lima, Peru

Manuela Candelaria Billinghurst López (1919 – 5 May 1967) was a Peruvian politician. In 1956 she was among the first group of women elected to Congress, serving until 1962.

== Biography ==
Billinghurst was born in Lima in 1919, the daughter of Guillermo Billinghurst Rodríguez-Prieto and Resurrección López Rincón, a singer. Her grandfather was Guillermo Billinghurst, who had served as president from 1912 to 1914. She studied at the Pontifical Catholic University of Peru, earning a bachelor's degree.

After women gained the right to vote and stand as candidates, she contested the 1956 Chamber of Deputies elections as an independent in Lima and was one of nine women elected to Congress. After being elected, she served on the Decentralisation Commission and the Women and Minors Commission.

After leaving Congress in 1962 she lived in the United States from 1964 to 1967. She died in Lima in 1967.
