= María Eleonora Silva Silva =

Peruvian politician (1930–2016)

Member of the Chamber of Deputies
- In office 1956–1962
- Constituency: Junín

Personal details
- Born: 27 October 1930; Jauja, Peru
- Died: 16 March 2016 (aged 85); Lima, Peru

María Eleonora Silva y Silva (27 October 1930 – 16 March 2016) was a Peruvian politician. In 1956 she was among the first group of women elected to Congress, serving until 1962.

== Biography ==
Silva was born in Jauja in 1930, the daughter of José Benigno Silva and María Ricardina de Silva. She was educated at the Colegio de Nuestra Señora del Carmen de Jauja, before studying law at the Catholic University. She married Luis Mayor, and had a son Luis Iván.

When women gained the right to vote and stand as candidates, she contested the 1956 Chamber of Deputies elections as an independent candidate in Junín, and was one of nine women elected to Congress. At the age of 25, she was the youngest of the nine. She sat on the Indigenous Affairs commission and the Tourism commission.

After leaving Congress in 1962, she worked at the Ministry of Industry and Commerce as Director of Fairs, promoting the export of Peruvian products. She died in 2016.
