= Juana Ubilluz de Palacios =

Peruvian educator and politician

Member of the Chamber of Deputies
- In office 1956–1962
- Constituency: Loreto

Juana Magdalena Ubilluz de Palacios was a Peruvian educator and politician. In 1956 she was among the first group of women elected to Congress, serving until 1962.

== Biography ==
Ubilluz worked as a kindergarten teacher in Iquitos.

When women gained the right to vote and stand as candidates, she contested the 1956 Chamber of Deputies elections as candidate of the Pradist Democratic Movement in Loreto, and was one of nine women elected to Congress. She sat on the Fine Art commission and the Mother and Child commission, remaining a member of Congress until 1962.
