= Alicia Blanco Montesinos =

Peruvian educator and politician

Member of the Chamber of Deputies
- In office 1956–1962
- Constituency: Junín

Alicia Leontina Felipa Blanco Montesinos de Salinas was a Peruvian educator and politician. In 1956 she was among the first group of women elected to Congress, serving until 1962.

== Biography ==
Blanco was born to Emilio Blanco and Margarita Montesinos. She was educated at the Colegio del Corazón de Jesús y los Sagrados Corazones, before attending the National University of San Marcos, where she earned a teaching degree. She later obtained a law degree from the Catholic University. She became headmistress of national colleges in Ayacucho and Huancayo.

After women gained the right to vote and stand as candidates, she contested the 1956 Chamber of Deputies elections as an independent in Junín, and was one of nine women elected to Congress alongside her sister Lola, who was elected in Ancash. After entering parliament, she sat on the Fine Arts commission, the "B" Justice commission and the National Archives commission. During a debate on 25 November 1960 she was insulted by Carlos Balarezo Delta, after which she hit him with her briefcase.
