= Matilde Pérez Palacio =

Peruvian educator, journalist and politician

Member of the Chamber of Deputies
- In office 1956–1962
- In office 1963–1968
- Constituency: Lima

Personal details
- Born: 8 September 1913; Lima, Peru
- Died: 16 August 1992 (aged 78)

Matilde Pérez Palacio Carranza (8 September 1913 – 16 August 1992) was a Peruvian educator, journalist and politician. In 1956 she was among the first group of women elected to Congress, serving until 1962, and again between 1963 and 1968.

== Biography ==
Pérez was born in Lima in 1913, the daughter of Matilde Carranza Valdez and Enrique Pérez Palacio, and a granddaughter of Luis Carranza Ayarza, a Congressman from the 1860s to 1890s. She attended the Colegio Sagrados Corazones Belén and earned a commercial accountancy diploma. She later attended the Catholic University, graduating in 1934 with a bachelor's degree in philosophy, history and letters.

She subsequently studied for a doctorate in history and geography, graduating in 1936, after which she worked as a professor of History and Geography at the Colegio de Belén. In 1939 she earned a Bachelor of Laws and qualified as a lawyer in 1941. The following year she became a doctor of pedagogy. From 1941 until 1970 she served as director of the Women's Institute of Higher Studies of the Catholic University, and in 1945 founded the university's School of Journalism, serving as its director until 1972, and was a correspondent for several national and overseas newspapers.

In 1956 Pérez was among the founders of Popular Action. She was a candidate in the 1956 Chamber of Deputies elections for the party and was one of first group of nine women elected to Congress. After entering parliament, she sat on the Press and Publications commission, the Social Assistance commission and the Women and Minors commission. She was elected to the Senate in the annulled 1962 elections, but returned to Congress as a deputy following the 1963 elections, serving until the 1968 coup. During her second term she chaired the Women and Minors Legislation Commission.

After leaving Congress she became a director of the Association of Journalists of Peru, the Human Rights Commission of the Lima Bar Association and a UNESCO representative, and was awarded the Order of the Sun of Peru. She died in 1992.
