= María Colina Lozano =

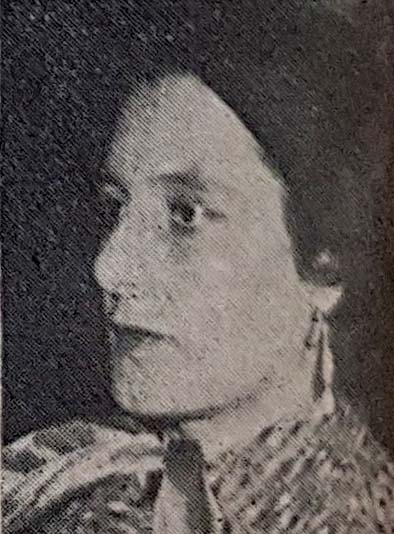

Member of the Chamber of Deputies
- In office 1956–1962
- In office 1963–1968
- Constituency: La Libertad

Personal details
- Born: 21 December 1921 Tayabamba, Peru
- Died: 28 July 2012 (aged 90) Lima, Peru

María Mercedes Colina Lozano de Gotuzzo (21 December 1921 – 28 July 2012) was a Peruvian politician. In 1956, she was among the first group of women elected to Congress, serving until 1962, and again between 1963 and 1968.

== Biography ==
Colina was born in Tayabamba in 1921, the daughter of Luis Colina and Celia Lozano. She attended school in Lima and then studied law at the National University of San Marcos. She married Luis Gotuzzo Romero, a lawyer and professor at the university. The couple had two children, Luis and Víctor Manuel.

After women gained the right to vote and stand as candidates, she contested the 1956 Chamber of Deputies elections for the American Popular Revolutionary Alliance in La Libertad, and was one of nine women elected to Congress. After entering parliament, she sat on the Mother and Child commission, the Municipalities commission and the Worship commission, and presented a bill for free universal education.

Although she lost her seat in the 1962 elections, she returned to Congress following the 1963 elections, serving until the 1968 coup. She died in Lima in 2012.
