= Mariano Iberico =

Peruvian philosopher and politician

Mariano Iberico Rodríguez (* Cajamarca, 1892 - died Lima, 1974) was a Peruvian philosopher.

== Life and education ==
He was born in Cajamarca, Peru on April 11, 1892 and received his higher education at the National University of San Marcos in Lima. In 1919 he was awarded doctorates in Literature, Political Science and Administration, and Jurisprudence. After completing his training, he became a professor in the School of Arts at the University of San Marcos, the same center of Lima where he had completed his studies. Throughout his career he would teach History of Modern Philosophy, Subjective Philosophy, History of Ancient Philosophy, Aesthetics and Contemporary Philosophers. From 1952-1955 he served as rector of the University and for a short period of time (December 1955), was Minister of Education.

== Philosophy and impact ==
There are two main areas in which Dr. Iberico focused: the relationship between aesthetics and metaphysics and dialectics of being and appearing. In his treatment of aesthetics he was very influenced by the ideas of Henri Bergson. His theory of symbolic knowledge summarized the relationship between aesthetic experience and metaphysics (the "feeling of cosmic life"), considering the latter a transcendental improvement on the former.

Considering his theory of the relationship between being and appearing, his most original contribution to philosophy, Dr. Iberico said that being ceases to be, in and of itself, when being appears mirrored before the conscience, which synthesizes being and appearance. Thus a dialectic of being is created that is reflected in appearance and appearance acquires the status of being.

The library of The National University of Cajamarca bears his name.

== Writings ==
Among his most important writings are:

- An Aesthetic Philosophy (Spanish: Una filosofía estética) (1920)
- The New Absolute (Spanish: El nuevo absoluto) (1926)
- The Journey of the Spirit (Spanish: El viaje del espíritu) (1929)
- The Divided Unity (Spanish: La unidad dividida) (1932)
- Notes on the Landscapes of the Sierra (Spanish: Notas sobre el paisaje de la sierra) (1937)
- The Sense of Cosmic Life (Spanish: El sentimiento de la vida cósmica) (1939)
- The Apparition: an essay on being and appearing (Spanish: La aparición: Ensayo sobre el ser y el aparecer) (1950).
- Psychology (Spanish: Psicología) (1958, co-written with Honorio Delgado).

Academic offices
Preceded by Pedro Dulanto	Rector de la Universidad de San Marcos 1952–1955	Succeeded by Fortunato Carranza

Government offices
Preceded by Carlos Rodríguez-Pastor Sr.	Peruvian Minister of Education December 1955	Succeeded by Juan Mendoza Rodríguez
