= Lola Blanco Montesinos =

Peruvian educator and politician

Member of the Chamber of Deputies
- In office 1956–1962
- Constituency: Ancash

Personal details
- Born: 1 July 1907; Lima, Peru
- Died: 30 July 1997 (aged 90)

Lola Blanco Montesinos de La Rosa Sánchez (1 July 1907 – 30 July 1997) was a Peruvian educator and politician. In 1956 she was among the first group of women elected to Congress, serving until 1962.

== Biography ==
Blanco was born in Lima in 1907 to Emilio Blanco and Margarita Montesinos. She was educated at the Colegio del Corazón de Jesús y los Sagrados Corazones, before attending the National University of San Marcos, where she earned a teaching degree. She subsequently taught at several private schools in Lim. She obtained a law degree from the Catholic University in 1937, and in the same year, became head of the National College of Women in Huaraz. She married Juan Francisco La Rosa Sánchez y Rodríguez in July 1937, and was still head of the National College of Women when Huarez was hit by a landslide in December 1941. Although the college's buildings were destroyed, all the students were saved.

After women gained the right to vote and stand as candidates, she contested the 1956 Chamber of Deputies elections in Ancash, and was one of nine women elected to Congress alongside her sister Alicia, who was elected in Junín. After entering parliament, she sat on the Mother and Children commission, the National Libraries and Museums commission and the Special Legislation commission. She remained a member of Congress until 1962 and died in 1997.
