= Zenón Noriega Agüero =

Peruvian army general (1900–1957)

Zenón Noriega
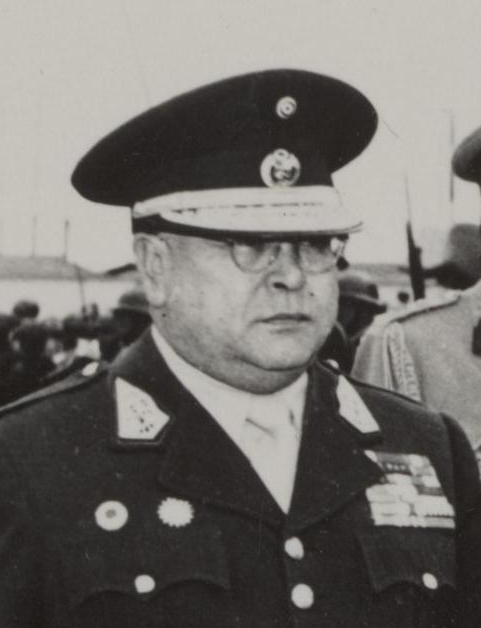

Interim President of the Government Junta of Peru
- In office June 1, 1950 – July 28, 1950
- Preceded by: Manuel A. Odría (President of the Government Junta)
- Succeeded by: Manuel A. Odría (Constitutional President)
- In office 29 October 1948 – 1 November 1948
- Preceded by: Manuel A. Odría (President of the Government Junta)
- Succeeded by: Manuel A. Odría (President of the Government Junta)

Personal details
- Born: July 12, 1900 Cajamarca, Peru
- Died: May 7, 1957 (aged 56) Lima, Peru

Zenón Noriega Agüero (July 12, 1900 – May 7, 1957) was a Peruvian army general who briefly served as the interim president of Peru through a military junta for two months in 1950.

== Biography ==
Noriega was born in Cajamarca in 1900 as the son of Wenceslao Noriega and María del Carmen Agüero. He served as Manuel A. Odría's deputy since Odría took power in a military coup in 1948. On June 1, 1950, Odría formally stepped down as president in order to pursue his candidacy in a presidential election in which he would be the only candidate. Noriega became president of the junta until July 28, when Odría resumed power. Political historians concede that Noriega did not rule on his own, but followed Odría's commands. He was immediately appointed prime minister by Odría, and served in that position until August 1954.

Already enshrined as constitutional president Odría after a questionable election, Noriega continued to serve as minister of war and president of the Council of Ministers. He was promoted to major general in 1953. In August 1954, he organized an abortive coup against Odría, for which he was sent into exile aboard one of the navy ships. It was said the conspiracy involved important people, being a symptom of the degree of decomposition in the Odriist regime.

Noriega went to Argentina, where he was received by President Juan Domingo Perón. Two years later he returned to Peru and retired to private life. He died in 1957.

Political offices
Preceded by Manuel A. Odría	Interim President of Peru; 1950	Succeeded by Manuel A. Odría
Preceded by Armando Revoredo Iglesias	Prime Minister of Peru; 1950 – 1954	Succeeded by Roque Augusto Saldías Maninat
