= National Democratic Front (Peru) =

National Democratic Front Frente Democrático Nacional
- Abbreviation: FREDENA
- Leader: José Luis Bustamante y Rivero
- Founded: 3 June 1944
- Dissolved: 27 October 1948

National Democratic Front (in Spanish: Frente Democrático Nacional) was a political coalition in Peru that was founded in 1944 in order to launch the presidencial campaign of José Luis Bustamante y Rivero for the 1945 general election.

The coalition comprised APRA and other parties like the Socialist Party of Peru and the fascist Revolutionary Union party. Within the coalition, APRA ran under the banner of the People's Party.

Upon Manuel Odría's successful coup d'état in October 1948 against Bustamante's presidency, the coalition ceased to exist.
