= Irene Silva de Santolalla =

Irene Silva de Santolalla

Irene Silva de Santolalla (May 10, 1902 – July 30, 1992) was a Peruvian writer, educator and politician. She was the first woman to be elected to the Senate of Peru.

The daughter of Oscar Silva Burga and Susana Linares de Silva, she was born Irene Silva Linares in Cajamarca. She was educated at Liceo del Carmen there and at the Colegio Sagrados Corazones in Lima.

She contributed an article to the Argentinian child psychology magazine Hijo mío…! in 1938. This led to further contributions to that magazine, as well as other similar publications such as Margarita in Chile and Personalidad y cultura mental in Cuba. In 1940, she published a collection of these articles Por la felicidad de nuestros hijos ("For our children's happiness"). In 1943, she published Hacia un mundo mejor ("Towards a better world"), a book of advice for parents.

De Santolalla attended conferences on issues related to women and children. In 1949, she taught family education at the Pontifical Catholic University of Peru. In 1952, she opened a school in Lima El Instituto de Orientación Matrimonial y Familiar ("School of Preparation for Marital and Family Life").

She served in the Senate from 1956 to 1962. In 1957, she was author of a law on family education. She also helped establish government-sponsored teacher training institutes.

She served as an advisor to UNICEF and UNESCO.

De Santolalla was named to the Order of the Sun of Peru. She was named Woman of the Americas by the Unión de Mujeres Americanas in 1956.

In 1922, she married Fausto Santolalla Bernal, an engineer; the couple had four children.

She died at home in Lima at the age of 90 after a long illness.
