= José Luis Bustamante y Rivero =

President of Peru from 1945 to 1948

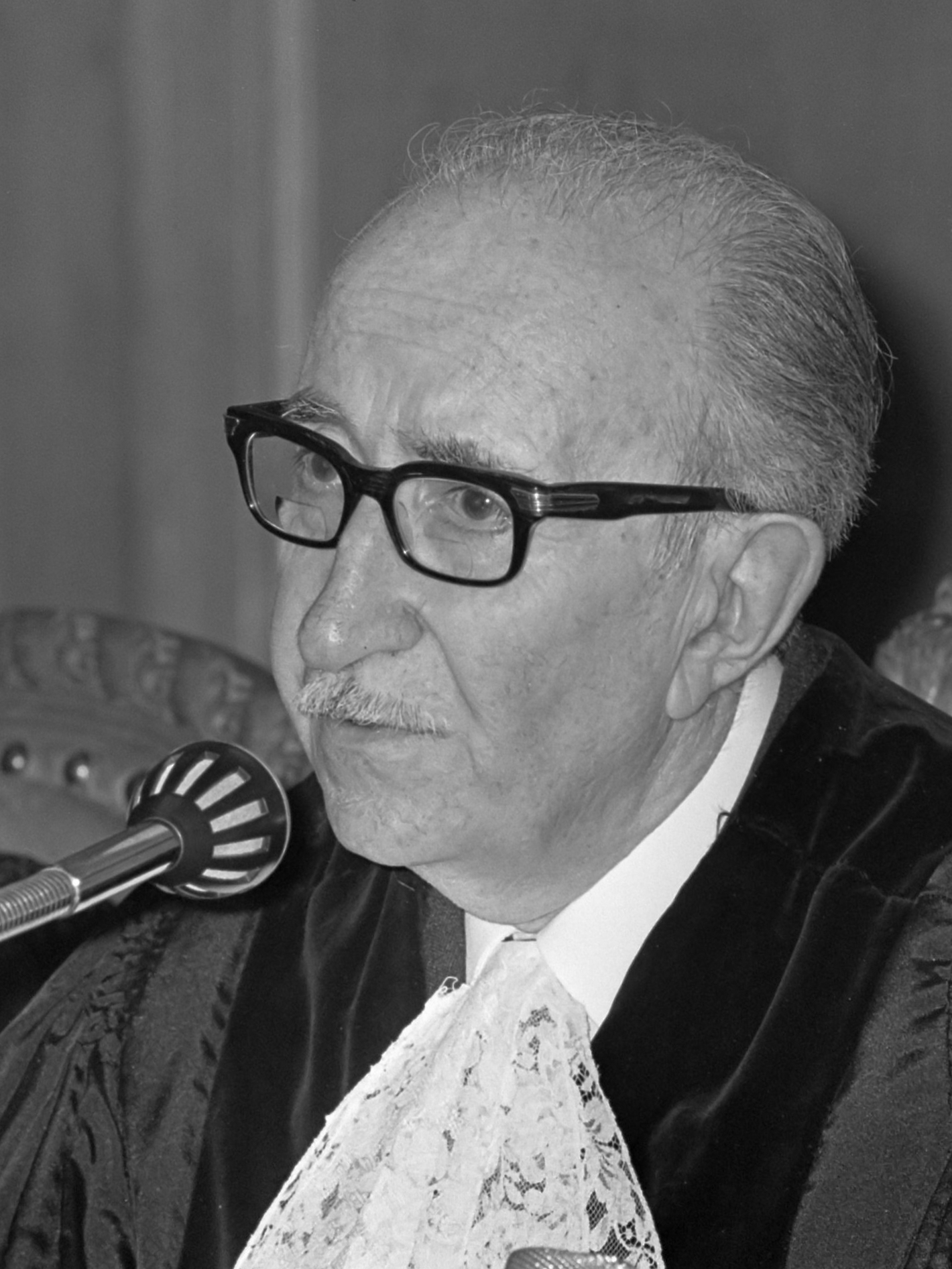
- Bustamante in 1968

44th President of Peru
- In office 28 July 1945 – 29 October 1948
- Prime Minister: Rafael Belaúnde Diez Canseco; Julio Ernesto Portugal Escobedo; José R. Alzamora Freundt; Roque Augusto Saldías Maninat; Armando Revoredo Iglesias
- Vice President: José Gálvez Barrenechea; Eduardo Ganoza y Ganoza
- Preceded by: Manuel Prado Ugarteche
- Succeeded by: Manuel A. Odría

Senator for Life Former President of the Republic
- In office 26 July 1980 – 11 January 1989

President of the International Court of Justice
- In office 5 February 1967 – 5 February 1970
- Preceded by: Percy Spender
- Succeeded by: Muhammad Zafarullah Khan

Minister of Justice, Instruction and Worship
- In office 24 November 1930 – 31 January 1931
- President: Luis Miguel Sánchez Cerro
- Preceded by: Armando Sologuren
- Succeeded by: Elías Lozada Benavente

Personal details
- Born: 15 January 1894 Arequipa, Peru
- Died: 11 January 1989 (aged 94) Lima, Peru
- Party: Frente Democrático Nacional
- Spouse: María Jesús Rivera
- Children: 2

José Luis Bustamante y Rivero (15 January 1894 – 11 January 1989) was a Peruvian lawyer, writer, politician, and diplomat who served as President of Peru from 1945 until his overthrow in 1948. He also served as the president of the International Court of Justice from 1967 to 1970.

== Early years ==
José Bustamante was born in Arequipa. His parents were Manuel Bustamante y Barreda, a lawyer and district attorney in Arequipa, and Victoria de Rivero y Romero. José married María Jesús Rivera in 1923. He received his early education in Arequipa at Colegio San José and obtained his law degree from the Universidad Nacional San Agustín de Arequipa in his native city and his Ph.D. from the Universidad Nacional San Antonio Abad in Cusco. After a distinguished career as a professor and legal scholar, Bustamante became interested in politics.

== Coup against Leguía ==
Bustamante reached political maturity as the author of the manifesto which launched the 1930 coup that ousted President Augusto B. Leguía. He soon earned the trust of Leguía's successor, Luis Miguel Sánchez Cerro, and began his new career in 1934 by serving as a diplomat, representing Peru as Peruvian Minister to Bolivia (1934–1938, 1942–1945) and Uruguay (1939–1942).

He ran for president in 1945 as a candidate for the Frente Democrático Nacional, a moderate, left-of-center party that aligned itself with Víctor Raúl Haya de la Torre's APRA and the Peruvian Communist Party. Opposing him was the Legión Patriótica Independiente candidate, Gen. Eloy G. Ureta. Bustamante comfortably won the election, the cleanest Peru had held in decades.

== Presidency ==
During his first seven days as president, Bustamante restored press freedom and full civil rights and freed all political prisoners. He also purged the military, cancelled gambling licenses and took control of the expenditures of the national treasury. One of his important international agreements was to establish that Peruvian sovereignty extended 200 miles out to sea, a doctrine that was widely accepted in international law. A number of progressive reforms were also carried out during the course of his presidency.

As president, Bustamante hoped to create a more democratic government by limiting the power of the military and the oligarchy. Conflict soon arose, however, between the president and Haya de la Torre. Without the support of the APRA party Bustamante found his presidency severely limited.

The murder of the ultraconservative editor Francisco Graña Garland, a prominent member of the Peruvian elite (and bitter editorial enemy of the APRA Party), sparked a political crisis that was blamed immediately on the APRA's influence on the Government. President Bustamante y Rivero was forced to name a military cabinet to tide over the crisis.

In October 1948, rebel sailors and officers seized five warships, locked up or shot their commanders, sent landing parties ashore under cover of a ragged bombardment. Shore-based sailors took over the Naval Academy, the Naval Armory, and the Real Felipe Fortress. After troops loyal to the government crushed the revolt, President Bustamante suspended all civil rights.

The insurrection, he declared, had been the work of the APRA Party. Under the President's orders, government troops occupied the APRA headquarters, seized the plant of its newspaper, La Tribuna, and arrested several prominent Apristas. But for the military cabinet, those moves were not enough. Postwar economic problems and strife caused by strong labor unions led to a military coup on October 29, 1948, which led General Manuel A. Odría to become the new president. Bustamante went into exile on the same day and was taken to Argentina.

== Post-presidency ==
While in exile, Bustamante resided in Buenos Aires, Madrid and Paris. On February 9, 1956, while Odría still in power, Bustamante returned to Peru, causing Peruvians great surprise. In 1960 he was elected a member of the International Court of Justice in The Hague and served as its president from 1967 to 1969.

In 1969, due to his recognition as an international jurist, the Organization of American States designated Bustamante as a mediator in the border conflict between El Salvador and Honduras known as the Football War, which ended peacefully after a peace treaty was signed on October 30, 1980, in Lima, Peru.

As a former president of Peru, Bustamante was ultimately elected senator for life from 1980 to 1989, as established by the Peruvian Constitution of 1979.

He died in Lima in 1989, aged 94, four days before his 95th birthday.

== Published works ==
José Bustamante was the author of several judicial and other related works currently in the National Library of Peru. His published works include the following:

- Arequipa (1947)
- Tres años de lucha por la democracia en el Perú (1949)
- Panamericanismo e iberoamericanismo (1951)
- Artesanía textil en el Perú (1952)
- Mensaje al Perú: Perú, estructura social (1960)
- La Corte Internacional de justicia (1964)
- Una visión del Perú (1972)
- Derecho del mar (1972)

Political offices
Preceded by Manuel Prado	President of Peru; July 1945 – October 1948	Succeeded by Manuel Odría
Preceded by Percy Spender	President of the International Court of Justice; 1967 – 1969	Succeeded by Muhammad Zafarullah Khan
