= Manuel A. Odría =

President of Peru (1897–1974)

Manuel A. Odría OESP
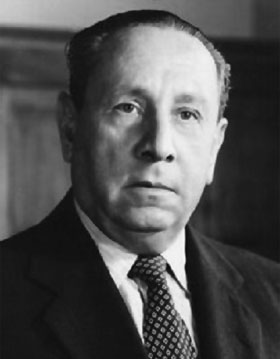

President of Peru
- In office 28 July 1950 – 28 July 1956
- Prime Minister: Zenón Noriega Agüero; Roque Saldías Maninat; Armando Revoredo Iglesias
- Vice President: Héctor Boza; Federico Bolognesi
- Preceded by: Zenón Noriega Agüero
- Succeeded by: Manuel Prado Ugarteche

President of the Government Junta of Peru
- In office 1 November 1948 – 1 June 1950
- Preceded by: Zenón Noriega Agüero
- Succeeded by: Zenón Noriega Agüero

Minister of Government and Police
- In office 12 January 1947 – 17 June 1948
- President: José Bustamante y Rivero
- Preceded by: Rafael Belaúnde Diez-Canseco
- Succeeded by: Julio César Villegas Cerro

Personal details
- Born: 26 November 1896 Tarma, Junín, Peru
- Died: 18 February 1974 (aged 77) Lima, Peru
- Party: Odriíst National Union
- Spouse: María Delgado Romero
- Children: 2
- Profession: Military officer

Military service
- Allegiance: Peru
- Rank: General
- Battles/wars: Ecuadorian–Peruvian War: Battle of Zarumilla

Manuel Arturo Odría Amoretti (26 November 1896 – 18 February 1974) was a military officer who served as the 45th President of Peru. He ousted President José Luis Bustamante y Rivero in the 1948 Peruvian coup d'état and seized power. He prevented other candidates from contesting the 1950 Peruvian general election, which he won with 100% of the vote as the sole candidate.

He ruled as a dictator, repressing the political opposition. He faced several coup attempts. He sought to distance himself from the coup plotters who brought him to power and to govern as a populist. Amid pressure, he was forced to call general elections for 1956, where the presidential elections were won by Manuel Prado Ugarteche.

== Biography ==
=== Early life and military career ===
Manuel Odría was born in 1896 in Tarma, a city in the central Andes just east of Lima. He graduated first in his class from the Chorillos Military Academy in 1915. He joined the army and as a Lieutenant Colonel was a war hero in the 1941 Ecuadorian–Peruvian War. He soon achieved the rank of Major General.

=== 1948 Peruvian coup d’etat and Presidency ===
In 1945, José Bustamante had attained the presidency with the help of the American Popular Revolutionary Alliance (APRA). Soon, major disagreements arose between Víctor Raúl Haya de la Torre, the founder of APRA, and President Bustamante. The President disbanded his Aprista cabinet and replaced it with a mostly military one. Odría, a fierce opponent of APRA, was appointed Minister of Government and Police. In 1948, Odría and other right-wing elements urged Bustamante to ban APRA. When the President refused, Odría resigned his post. On October 27, 1948, he led a successful military coup against the government and took over as president. After two years, he resigned and had one of his colleagues, Zenón Noriega, take office as a puppet president so he could run for president as a civilian. He was duly elected a month later as the only candidate.

Odría came down hard on APRA, momentarily pleasing the oligarchy and all others on the right. Like Juan Perón, he followed a populist course that won him great favor with the poor and lower classes. A thriving economy allowed him to indulge in expensive but crowd-pleasing social policies. These included an expansion of social security, extra fringe benefits for workers, food price subsidies, and the building of new schools, hospitals, and housing estates. At the same time, however, civil rights in the nation were severely restricted and corruption was rampant throughout his régime. People feared that his dictatorship would run indefinitely; they were surprised when Odría legalized opposition parties in 1956 and called fresh elections. He did not run for office. He favored Hernando de Lavalle y Garcia in the election. He was succeeded by a former president, Manuel Prado.

=== 1962 and 1963 general elections ===
When national elections were held again in 1962, Odría ran as a right-wing candidate for the Unión Nacional Odriista party. None of the three major candidates - Odría, Haya de la Torre and Fernando Belaúnde - received the required one third of the vote to win with a plurality. It appeared that Odría would win the Presidency in Congress, after having made a deal with Haya de la Torre, but a military coup removed President Prado from office a few days before his term ended. Elections were held again in 1963, with the same three major candidates. This time Belaúnde won with 39% of the vote.

During the Belaúnde administration, Odría made an alliance with Haya de la Torre to create a single opposition block in Parliament, which became known as the APRA-UNO Coalition. As a political force, they managed to create strong parliamentary opposition to President Belaúnde, who was forced to make important concessions to the Coalition in order to get most of his party-sponsored legislation enacted. The Coalition suffered a setback after losing the elections for mayor in the capital, Lima.

=== Later life and death ===
After the military coup that overthrew Belaúnde in 1968, Odría kept a low profile in Peruvian politics until his death in 1974.

== Personal life ==
Odría has descendants currently active in Peruvian politics. They are Enrique Odría Sotomayor and Brenda Odria Loayza,

== Notes ==
Political offices
Preceded by José Bustamante	President of Peru; 1948–1950	Succeeded by Zenón Noriega
Preceded by Zenón Noriega	President of Peru; 1950–1956	Succeeded by Manuel Prado
