= Cabeza de Vaca (disambiguation) =

Álvar Núñez Cabeza de Vaca was a Spanish explorer.

Cabeza de Vaca may also refer to:

- Cabeza de Vaca (film), a 1991 Mexican film
- Cabeza de Vaca, Tumbes, a Peruvian archaeological site
- Diego Cabeza de Vaca (d. 1625), Spanish Roman Catholic prelate
- Francisco Javier García Cabeza de Vaca (b. 1967), Mexican politician
- Francisco Vera Cabeza de Vaca (1637–1700), Spanish painter
- Luis Cabeza de Vaca (d. 1550), Bishop of Palencia, Spain
- Martín Cabeza de Vaca, (d. 1534), Spanish Roman Catholic prelate
- The Marquess of Portago family, including:
  - Alfonso de Portago (1928-1957), Spanish aristocrat and sportsperson
  - Vicente Cabeza de Vaca y Fernández de Córdoba, Marquis of Portago (1865–1921), Spanish politician
- Rafael Benjumea Cabeza de Vaca (1939–2021), Spanish aristocrat and engineer
- Vicente Sartorius y Cabeza de Vaca (1931–2002), Spanish nobleman and Olympic bobsledder

== See also ==
- Esteban Cabeza de Baca (b. 1985), American artist
- Ezequiel Cabeza De Baca (1864–1917), the first Hispano elected for office as lieutenant governor in New Mexico
- Fabiola Cabeza de Baca Gilbert (1894–1991), American educator
- Luis CdeBaca (b. 1967), American politician
