= Alfonso López Chau =

Peruvian economist and politician (born 1950)

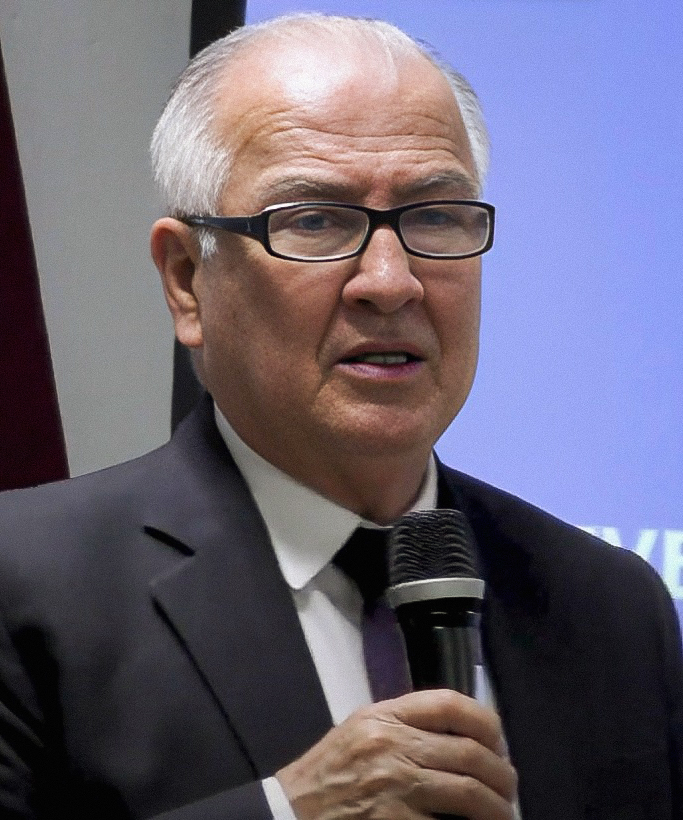
- López-Chau in 2023

Member of Senate
- Incumbent
- Assumed office 26 July 2026
- Constituency: Nationwide
Academic offices
Rector of the National University of Engineering
In office 28 September 2021 – 7 May 2025
| Preceded by | Pedro Canales García |
| Succeeded by | Shirley Chilet Cama |
Director of the Central Reserve Bank of Peru
In office 23 November 2006 – 23 December 2012
| President | Julio Velarde |

Personal details
- Born: Pablo Alfonso López Chau Nava; 17 July 1950 (age 76) Lima, Peru
- Party: AN (since 2023)
- Other political affiliations: APRA (1965–1969); IU (1980–1995); UPP (2006–2012)
- Education: National University of Callao (BEc); National Autonomous University of Mexico (MEc, Doctorate)

Pablo Alfonso López Chau Nava (born 17 July 1950) is a Peruvian economist, academic and politician, who served as rector of the National University of Engineering from 2021 to 2025. López-Chau also was one of the directors of the Central Reserve Bank of Peru, chaired by Julio Velarde, having been appointed by the Congress of Peru for the period from 2006 to 2012.

He is the founder and leader of the Now Nation political party and ran in the 2026 presidential election as the party's candidate.

== Early life and education ==
Pablo Alfonso López Chau Nava was born in Lima and grew up in the Barrio Obrero Frigorífico neighborhood in Callao. He is of partial Chinese descent. In 1976, he graduated with a degree in economics from the National University of Callao. In 1985, he obtained a master's degree in Economics from the National Autonomous University of Mexico.

According to his own account, he was an Aprista between the ages of 15 and 19, leaving the APRA party during his university studies, and helping to organize the United Left congress. Furthermore, according to his statements, he was a political prisoner twice during the military government of Juan Velasco Alvarado and was later pardoned. An opinion column by López Chau was published in 1989 in Cambio magazine, the unofficial publication of the Túpac Amaru Revolutionary Movement (MRTA) far-left guerrilla group. In it, he described Víctor Polay Campos, the MRTA leader then imprisoned, as "a man whose program I don't entirely share, but I believe he is not only a social fighter, but also a political fighter", mentioning his childhood friendship with Polay, and saying that Polay was not "a common criminal." During his later political career, the piece went viral due to conflicting opinions on the history of the MRTA. When discussing the topic, López-Chau reaffirmed his condemnation of terrorism and said those criticizing his opinion were engaged in terruqueo attacks against him. Days later, in interviews and in a column in the newspaper La República, he recounted his condemnation of the insurgent terrorist groups during the 1980-2000 internal armed conflict, contextualizing his personal relationship with Polay from their time in the APRA youth movement; though he did describe his 1989 text to be "lenient."

Over the decades, he gained experience as a senior professor in the areas of macroeconomics, economic policy, development theories, and political economy at the Faculty of Economic Engineering, Statistics, and Social Sciences of the National University of Engineering (FIEECS UNI). He served as acting dean (2001), director of the Professional School of Economics, and director of postgraduate studies (1998) at that faculty. He obtained a doctorate in Economics from the National Autonomous University of Mexico in 2005. He won a competition for a professorship as an associate professor in the Political Economy and Macroeconomics courses at the Universidad Autónoma Metropolitana of Mexico. He has also served as a professor in the doctoral program at the National University of San Marcos and the Center for Higher National Studies (CAEN), having been awarded as a distinguished professor.

== Political career ==
=== Early political career ===
In the 1995 general election, he unsuccessfully ran for Congress for the socialist party Apertura para el Desarrollo Nacional, obtaining 1019 votes. López Chau temporarily joined Union for Peru in 2010. He was elected by Congress to serve as a director of the Central Reserve Bank of Peru (BCRP) under chairman Julio Velarde for the period of 2006–2013.

=== Rector of the National University of Engineering ===
On 28 September 2021 Rector López Chau, was named rector of the National University of Engineering, one of the largest universities in Peru. During the widespread protests against Dina Boluarte in 2022 and 2023 that resulted in more than 50 people killed, López Chau granted refuge to some demonstrators attempting to avoid protest violence. He agreed to host delegations of university students protesting during the Toma of Lima marches at the university facilities.

In late January 2023, the youth protesters from southern Peru began to promote a possible presidential candidacy for López Chau. In February 2023, in the context of discussions about possible snap congressional election, there were suggestions that López-Chau would become the Purple Party's presidential candidate; a few days later, he confirmed dialogue and negotiations with the party, but made it clear that he would not be the organization's candidate in order to continue to adhere to his own democratic principles. On 19 July 2023, he participated in the Third Toma of Lima.

In July 2025, the Public Ministry of Peru opened investigations on López Chau for alleged collusion and incompatible negotiation. He faced investigations regarding allegedly appointing Sonia Anapan Ulloa as general secretary, despite her not meeting the requirements of the university statutes and simultaneously holding a position at SINEACE (National System for Evaluation, Accreditation, and Certification of Educational Quality), which would violate public service regulations. Furthermore, her appointment was reportedly not approved by the university council. The Ministry also pointed to a salary increase granted to Anapan in less than three months, considered a possible case of undue favoritism. For these acts, a sentence of five years' imprisonment, a fine, and a twelve-year disqualification from holding public office was requested for both.

=== Presidential candidacy ===
In early September 2023, López Chau began the process of registering the political party Ahora Nación with the National Jury of Elections (JNE). In June 2024, he officially announced his presidential aspirations and stated that he sought to contribute to the creation of a broader coalition of different political parties for the upcoming 2026 general election. He declared that his electoral campaign will be conducted in Spanish and in indigenous languages such as Quechua, Aymara, and Asháninka.

On Sunday, 1 February 2026, he began his presidential campaign in the city of Juliaca, holding a political rally in the city's main square.

== Political positions ==
López Chau defines himself as a centre-left politician. He promises to promote the creation of sovereign wealth funds (SWFs) so that Peru can invest state resources more profitably. In the fields of industry and engineering, he proposes that the country adopt as a state policy the promotion of the transformation of the productive matrix through the green hydrogen (H2) industry.

He also considers it viable and timely to change the current Constitution of Peru, with the exception of the economic model. He has declared himself a supporter of the 1979 Constitution and proposes updating it while maintaining the social market economy of the 1993 Constitution.

== Publications ==
López Chau has published research on alternative development strategies; growth, inflation, and the external sector; as well as international economic policy. He founded and directed the journal Apertura (1992–1996) and has numerous publications and opinion columns in national newspapers and magazines such as El Comercio, La República, Gestión, and Hildebrandt en sus Trece. He has also published in journals and books promoted by the National Autonomous University of Mexico (UNAM).

=== Books ===
- La mejor forma de estabilizar. Invertir-invertir e invertir más
- Proyecto de nación: liberalismo social o socialismo liberal (2019)
- Estrategia de desarrollo alternativo para la economía peruana (2020)
- Unidad, justicia y libertad (2023)
- Modernidad para todos (2025)
