= Flag Square =

Flag Square may refer to:

- Flag's Square, Vlorë, Albania
- Flag Square of Santo Domingo, Dominican Republic
- Flag Square, Lima, Lima, Peru
- State Flag Square, Baku, Azerbaijan
- State Flag Square and Museum of Nakhchivan, Nakchivan, Azerbaijan
- State Flag Square, Minsk, Belarus
