= Peruvian libra =

Former currency of Peru

Peruvian gold pound
libra peruana de oro (Spanish)
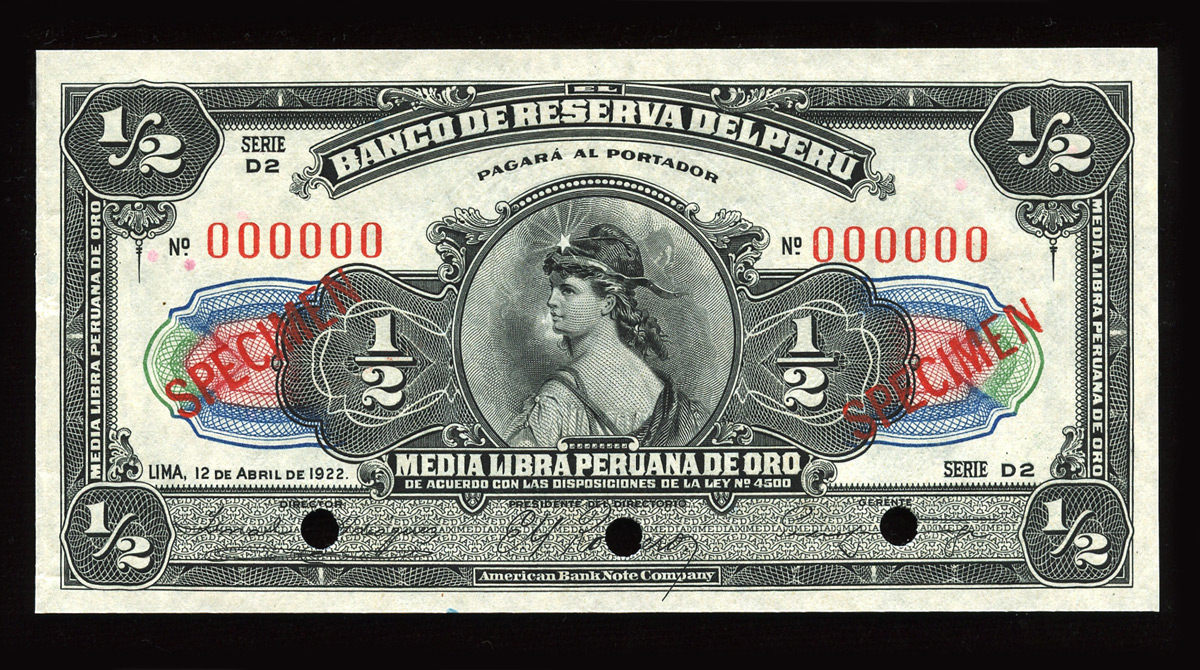
- Lp. 1/2 banknote (1922)

Unit
- Symbol: Lp.

Denominations
- Banknotes: Lp. 1/2, Lp.1, Lp. 5, Lp. 10
- Coins: Lp. 1/5, Lp. 1/2, Lp. 1

Demographics
- Date of introduction: 1898
- Date of withdrawal: 1931
- User(s): Peru

Issuance
- Central bank: Reserve Bank of Peru (1922–1931)

Valuation
- Value: Lp. 1 = S/. 10
- This infobox shows the latest status before this currency was rendered obsolete.

The Peruvian gold pound (Spanish: libra peruana de oro; abbreviation: Lp.), was a unit of currency issued in Peru between 1898 and 1931. It was fixed in value to 10 soles de plata and was issued in the form of gold coins and banknotes, which circulated alongside coins denominated in centavos, dineros and soles. The gold pound was equal to the British sovereign.

== History ==
The first pound coins were minted in 1898, to the same standard as the British sovereign (113 grains of pure gold). In 1901, Peru adopted a gold standard based on the pound worth 10 soles. The gold standard was maintained until 1932 (see Peruvian sol for more details). Coins were issued until 1930, banknotes until 1933.

== Coins ==
Three denominations were minted. The Lp. 1 was for issued circulation between 1898 and 1930, the Lp.1/2 between 1902 and 1913, and the Lp. 1/5 between 1905 and 1930.

== Banknotes ==
Between 1914 and 1918, Cheques Circulares were issued redeemable by six banks for Lp. 1/2, Lp. 1, Lp. 5 and Lp. 10. The Reserve Bank of Peru took over the production of paper money in 1922, introducing notes for the same denominations as the earlier cheques. In 1933, some of these notes, together with unissued notes dated 1926, were overstamped by the Central Reserve Bank of Peru with their values in soles.
