= Wealth and Pride of Peru coinage =

Serie numismática riqueza y orgullo del Perú (Spanish)
- Peru
- Value: 1 Peruvian nuevo sol/sol
- Mass: 7.32 g
- Diameter: 25.5 mm
- Composition: Alpaca silver
- Mintage: 10,000,000 coins for each theme

Obverse

Reverse
- Design: Coat of arms of Peru

The numismatic series Wealth and Pride of Peru ("Riqueza y Orgullo del Perú" in Spanish) were minted by the Central Reserve Bank of Peru with the aim of promoting a numismatic culture and disseminate the cultural heritage of Peru. Each coin depicts a department of Peru, showing a tourist attraction in the region.

All coins in the series have the denomination of One Nuevo Sol/Sol and are legal tender throughout the country. Ten million units of each of the following coins have been minted:

Order	Obverse	Reverse	Issued date	Theme	Region
1			March 2010	Tumi de Oro	Lambayeque
2			July 2010	Karajía Sarcophagi	Amazonas
3			November 2010	Raimondi Stela	Ancash
4			February 2011	Chullpas de Sillustani	Puno
5			May 2011	Santa Catalina Monastery	Arequipa
6			July 2011	Machu Picchu	Cusco
7			November 2011	Citadel of Gran Pajatén	San Martin
8			March 2012	The Saywite Stone	Apurimac
9			July 2012	Real Felipe Fortress	Callao
10			October 2012	Archaeological Complex of Vilcashuamán	Ayacucho
11			December 2012	Kuntur Wasi (House of the Condor)	Cajamarca
12			March 2013	Inca Temple of Huaytará	Huancavelica
13			May 2013	Temple of the Crossed Hands of Kotosh	Huanuco
14			September 2013	Paracas textile	Ica
15			November 2013	Archaeological Site of Tunanmarca	Junin
16			April 2014	Sacred City of Caral	Lima Province
17			August 2014	Huaca de la Luna	La Libertad
18			December 2014	Old Hotel Palace	Loreto
19			January 2015	Cathedral of Lima	Lima
20			March 2015	Petroglyphs of Pusharo	Madre de Dios
21			June 2015	Moqueguan architecture	Moquegua
22			November 2015	Warawtampu	Pasco
23			December 2015	Vicus pottery	Piura
24			April 2016	Cabeza de Vaca	Tumbes
25			July 2016	Shipibo-Conibo pottery	Ucayali
26			September 2016	Tacna Parabolic Arch	Tacna

== See also ==
- Peruvian sol
- Numismatic series Natural Resources of Peru
