= Old Hotel Palace =

Building in Iquitos, Peru

Coordinates: 3.750688°S 73.243716°W

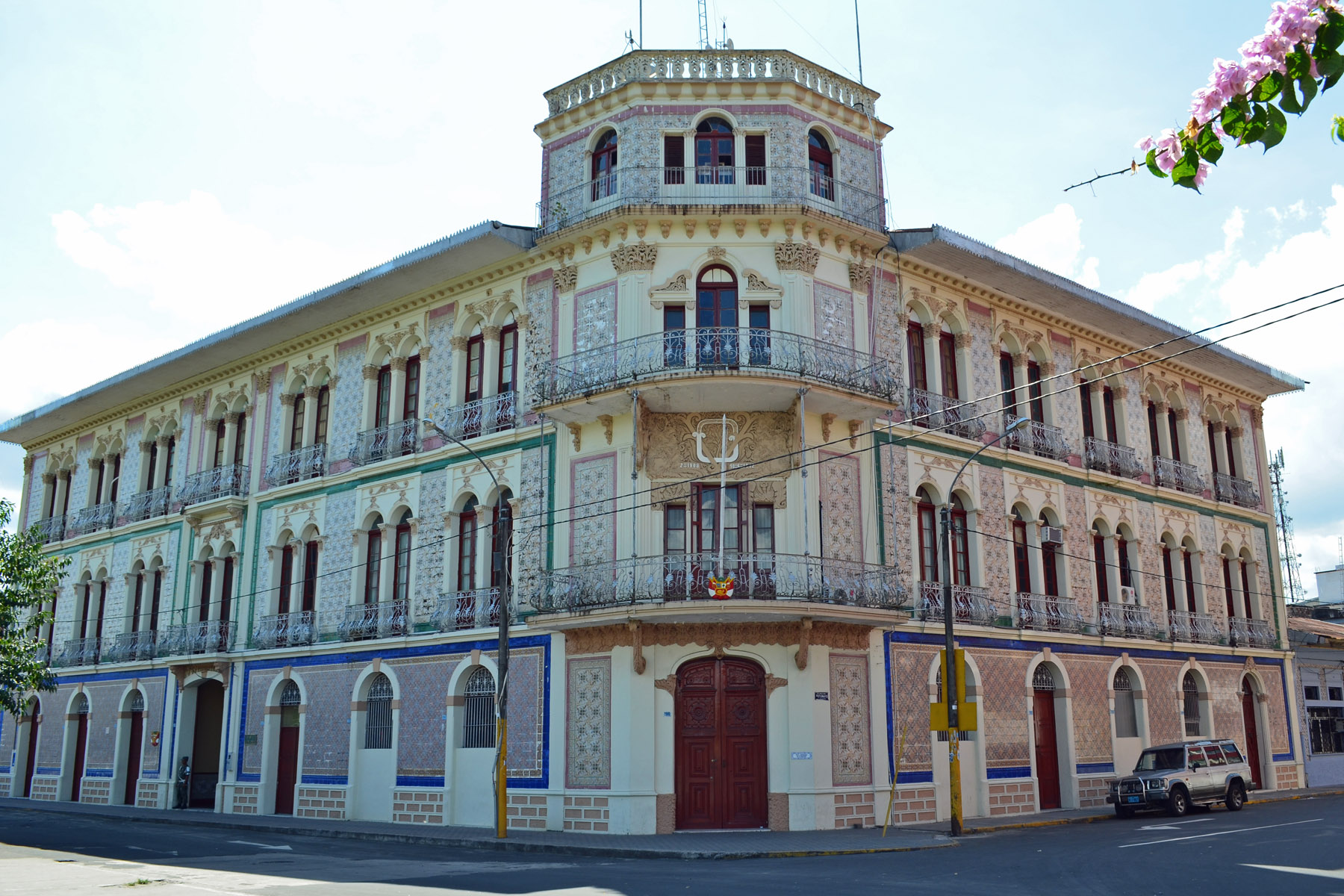
- Interactive map of the Old Hotel Palace area

General information
- Architectural style: Modernist
- Location: Iquitos, Peru
- Construction started: 1908

Design and construction
- Architect: José Altamira y Motta
- Engineer: Samuel Young Mass

Old Hotel Palace is a modernist building in Iquitos, Loreto, Peru. It was a hotel and was built between 1908 and 1912. It is located on the Malecón Tarapacá, Historic Centre of Iquitos. The hotel is located one blocks from the Plaza de Armas. The Old Hotel Palace was built by engineer Samuel Young Mass and Spanish architect José Altamira y Motta for Otoniel Vela Llerena. The hotel was an important luxury hotel during the era Amazon rubber boom. Currently serves as the office of the Fifth Military Region of Peru.

Its image was used on a commemorative 1 Sol coin in 2014, to represent the Loreto Region, part of a series titled "Wealth and Pride of Peru".

All the elements for building were transported across the Atlantic. The tiles were brought from Malaga, with "reminiscences of Antoni Gaudí's architecture", it contains Gothic and neoclassical elements. The building conspicuously includes a complex design, wrought iron with plant shapes on the balconies, metalwork and tall portals.
