= Peruvian Motherland =

National personification of Peru

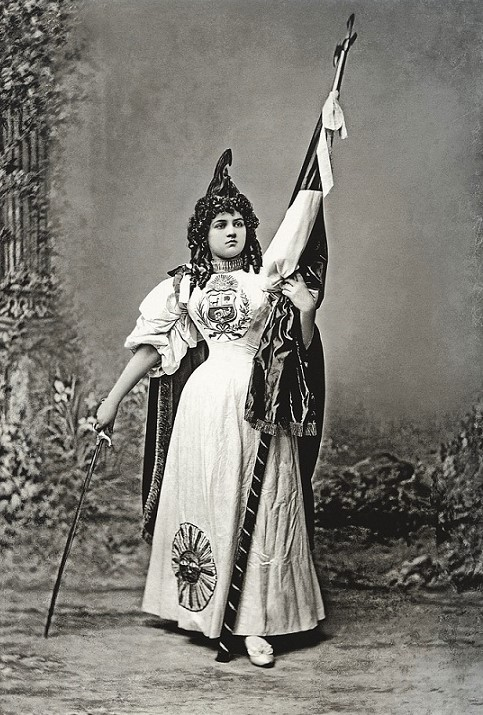
Patria, by Eugenio Courret (1915).

The Motherland (Spanish: Madre patria) is the national personification of Peru.

== Appearance ==
The figure, first introduced during the Peruvian War of Independence, generally has the appearance of a (generally) seated female with a Greek profile wearing a laurel wreath and a white tunic. Official usage included her appearance on banknotes and coins formerly issued by the Peruvian government, as well as in statues, such as the one in Flag Square or in the Plaza San Martín of central Lima.

== Gallery ==
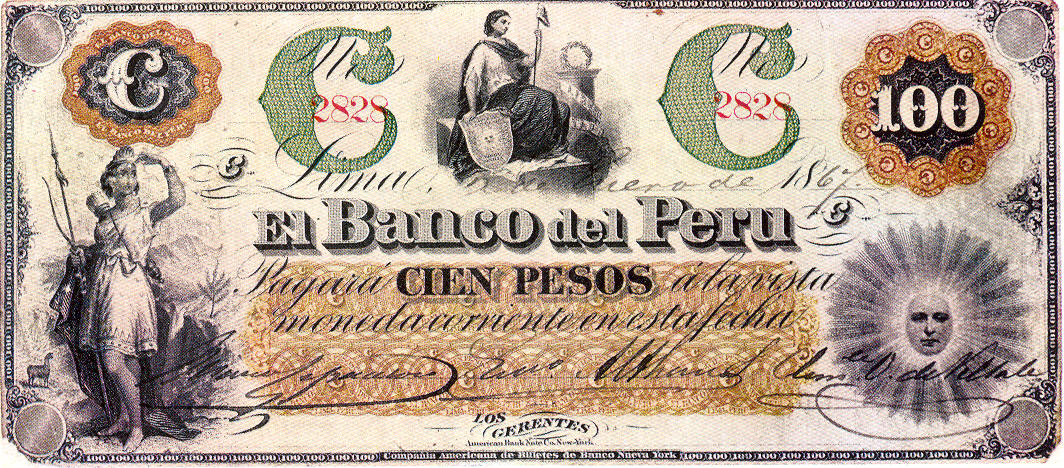
Rs. 100 banknote with the figure in the centre

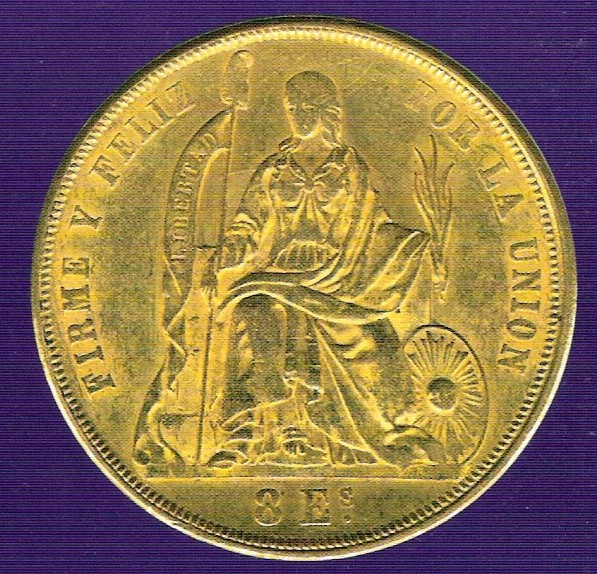
1863 coin showing the figure

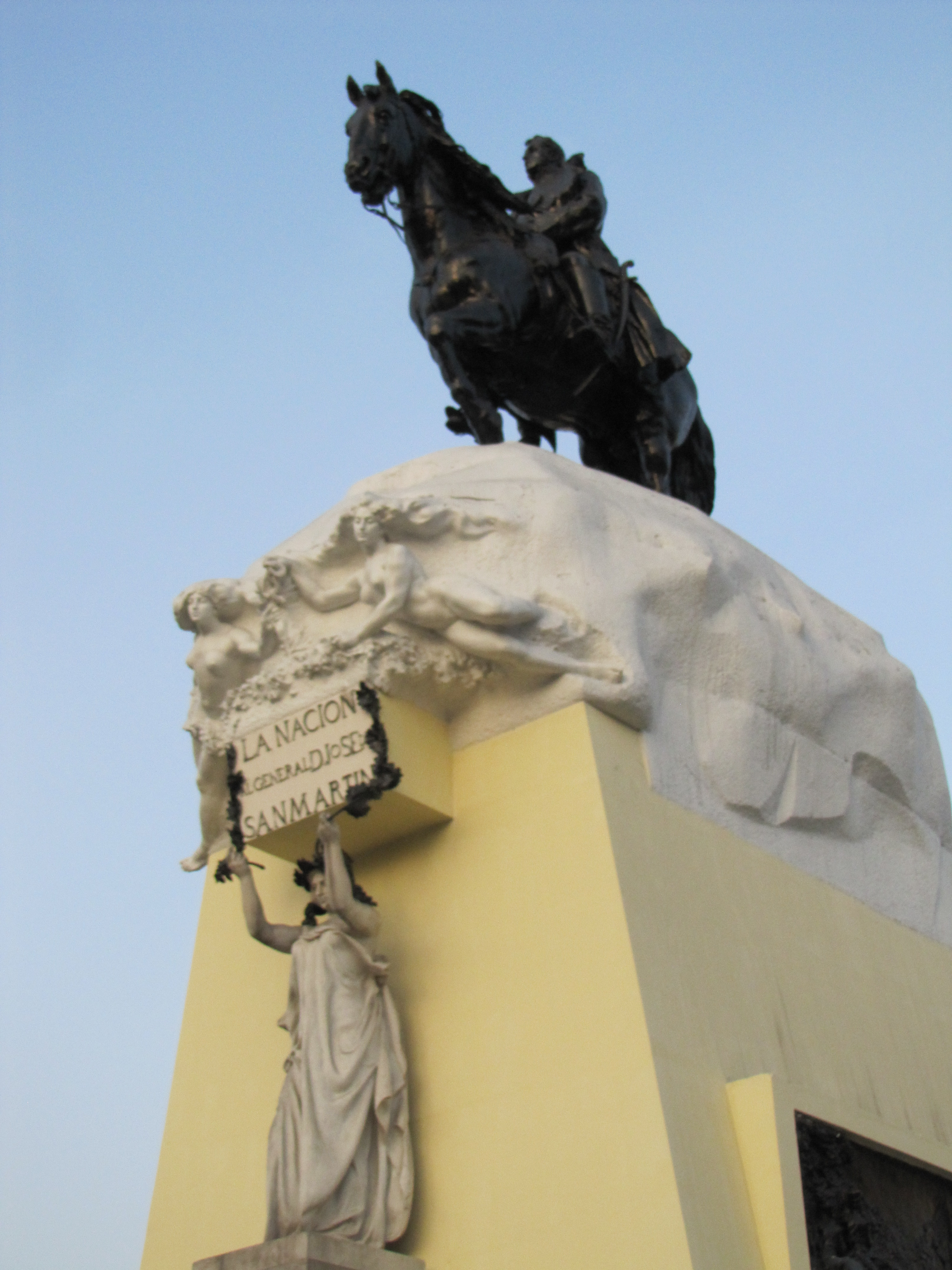
The statue in the Plaza San Martín

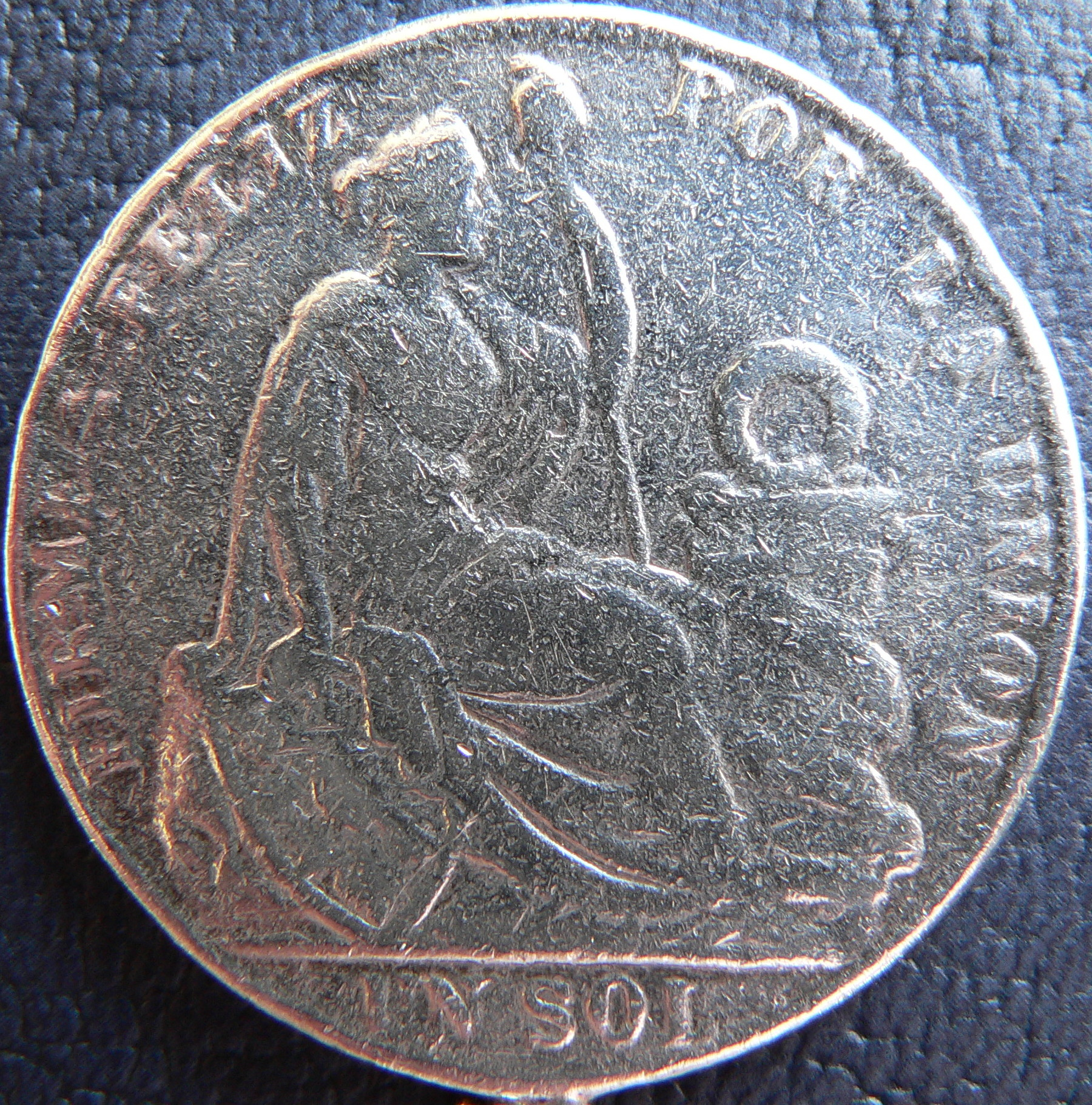
S/. 1 coin showing the figure

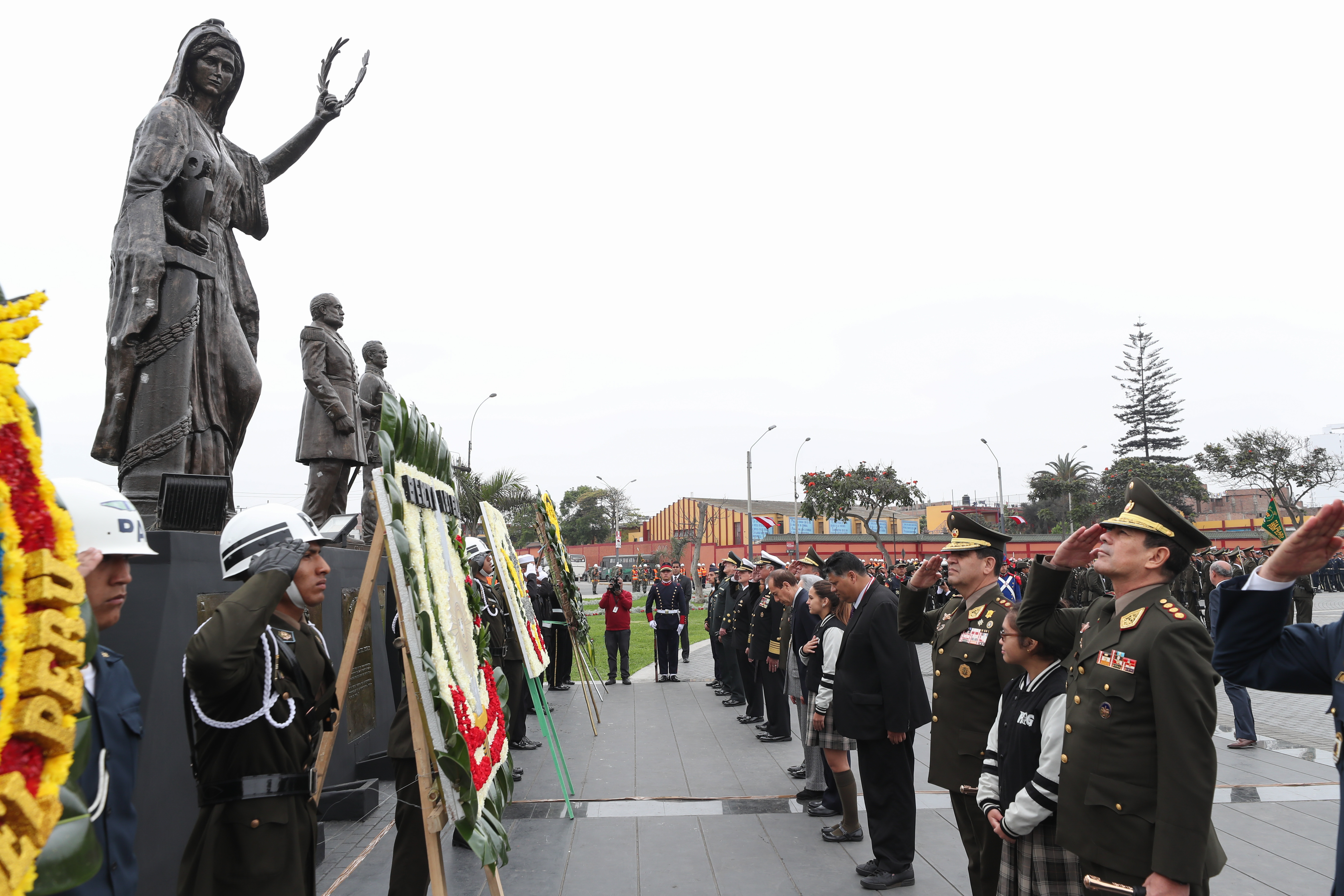
The statue in Flag Square

== See also ==
- Hispania (personification)
- El Perú Libre
