= Natural Resources of Peru coinage =

Recursos Naturales del Perú (Spanish)
- Peru
- Value: 1 Peruvian Nuevo Sol
- Mass: 7.32 g
- Diameter: 25.5 mm
- Composition: Alpaca silver
- Mintage: 10.000.000 each theme

Obverse
- Design: Quinoa
- Design date: 2013

Reverse
- Design: Coat of arms of Peru

The numismatic series Natural Resources of Peru ("Recursos naturales del Perú" in Spanish) is a series of coins minted by the Central Reserve Bank of Peru with the aim of both promoting a numismatic culture and highlighting the natural wealth of Peru.

All coins in the series have the denomination of 1 Nuevo Sol and are legal tender throughout the country. Ten million units of each of the following coins have been minted:

Order	Obverse	Reverse	Issued date	Theme
1			July 2013	The anchovy
2			July 2013	Cacao
3			July 2013	Quinoa

== See also ==
- Peruvian nuevo sol
- Numismatic series Wealth and Pride of Peru
