= Peseta =

Peseta may refer to:

- Catalan peseta, a former currency of Catalonia
- Equatorial Guinean peseta, a former currency of Equatorial Guinea
- Peruvian peseta, a former currency of Peru
- Sahrawi peseta, the de jure currency of the Sahrawi Arab Democratic Republic
- Spanish peseta, a former currency of Spain
  - Banknotes of the Spanish peseta
  - La Peseta, Madrid, a residential area
    - La Peseta (Madrid Metro), Madrid Metro station

== See also ==
- Gatoloai Peseta Sio, Western Samoan chief, musician, writer and politician
- Peseta Vaifou Tevaga, Samoan politician
