= Peruvian inca =

Peruvian currency from 1881 to 1882

inca peruana (Spanish)

Denominations
- Subunit
- 1/10: real de inca
- 1/100: centavo de inca

Demographics
- Date of introduction: 1881
- Date of withdrawal: 1882
- User(s): Peru

Valuation
- Value: 1 inca = 10 soles
- This infobox shows the latest status before this currency was rendered obsolete.

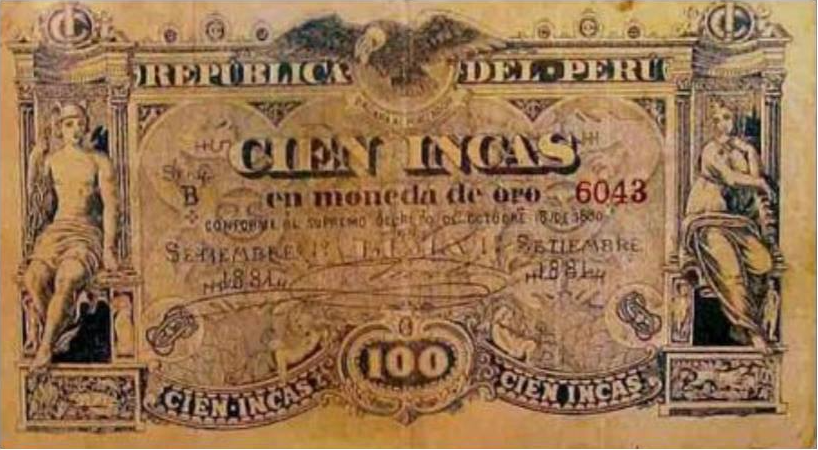
Counterside of 100 Inca Bill

The inca was a unit of currency in Peru between 1881 and 1882. The inca was issued in banknote form only and was subdivided into 10 reales de inca or 100 centavos de inca. It was replaced by the Peruvian sol at a rate of 1 inca = 10 soles. The banknotes were withdrawn in 1882.

== Banknotes ==
The inca appeared on two series of banknotes, one consisting of overprints on earlier notes, the other a regular issue. The overprinted denominations were 1 real de inca, surcharged on old 1 sol notes, 5 reales de inca, stamped on old 5 soles notes, and 100 centavos de inca (i.e., 1 inca), surcharged on old 100 soles notes. The regular issue of notes was in denominations of 1, 5 and 100 incas. Some of the regular issue 5 and 10 inca notes were later surcharged with their value in soles.
