= Peruvian inti =

Former currency of Peru

inti peruano (Spanish)
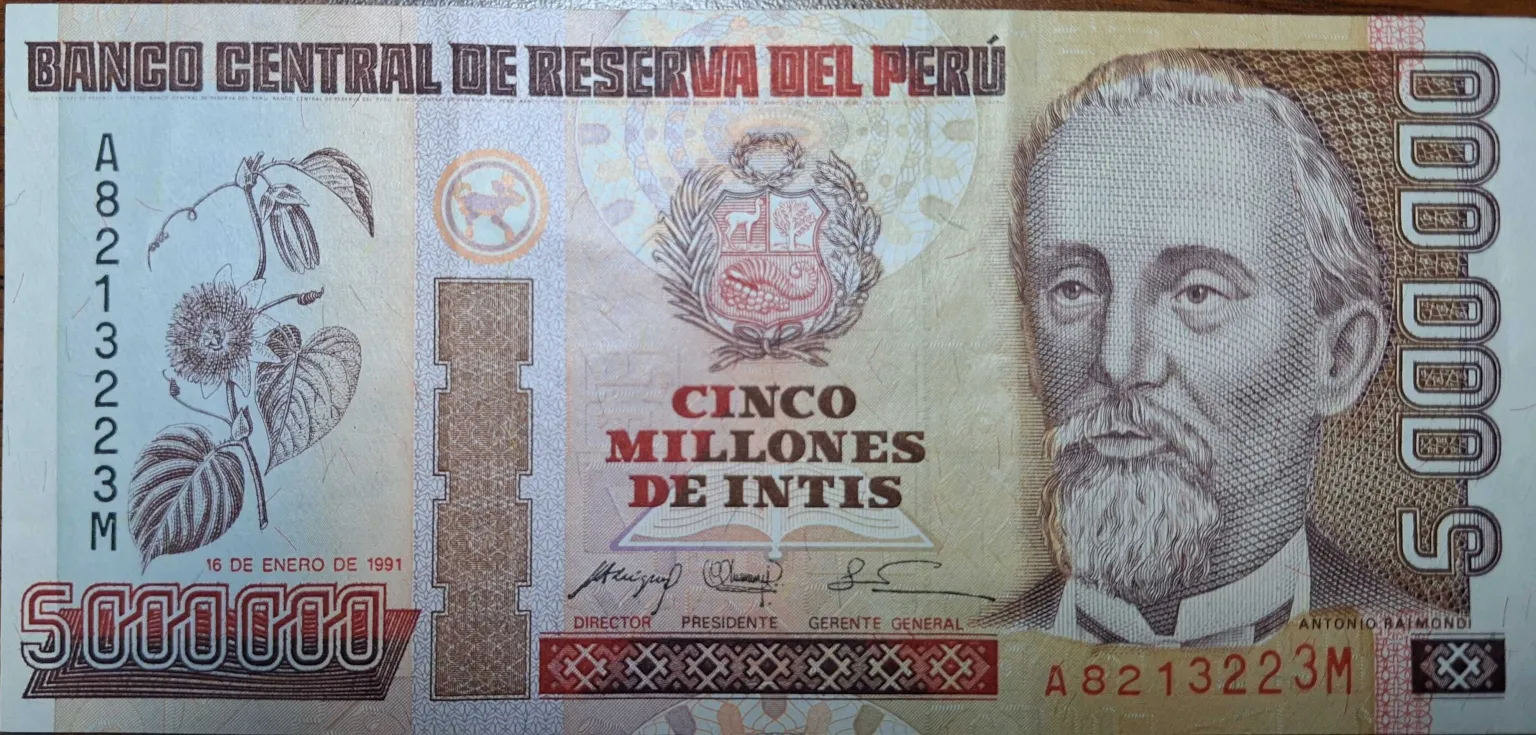
- 5.000.000 Intis note(1991), highest denonimation note of the Inti

ISO 4217
- Code: PEI

Unit
- Plural: intis
- Symbol: I/.

Denominations
- Superunit
- 1,000,000: inti millón (I/m.)
- Subunit
- 1/100: céntimo
- Banknotes: I/.10, I/.50, I/.100, I/.500, I/.1,000, I/.5,000, I/.10,000, I/.50,000, I/.100,000, I/.500,000, I/.1,000,000, I/.5,000,000
- Coins: 1, 5, 10, 20, 50 céntimos, I/.1, I/.5

Demographics
- Date of introduction: 1 February 1985
- Replaced: Peruvian sol
- Date of withdrawal: 1991
- Replaced by: Peruvian nuevo sol
- User(s): Peru

Issuance
- Central bank: Central Reserve Bank of Peru
- Website: www.bcrp.gob.pe

Valuation
- Inflation: >12,000%
- Value: 1000000 PEI = 1 PEN
- This infobox shows the latest status before this currency was rendered obsolete.

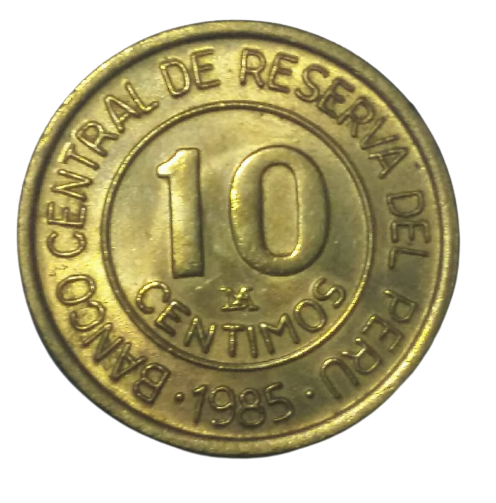
10 centimos coin 1985

500 intis with a portrait of Túpac Amaru II.

The inti was the currency of Peru between 1985 and 1991. Its ISO 4217 code was PEI and its abbreviation was I/. The inti was divided into 100 céntimos. The inti replaced the inflation-stricken sol. The new currency was named after Inti, the Inca sun god.

== History ==
The inti was introduced on 1 February 1985, replacing the sol de oro which had suffered from high inflation. One inti was equivalent to 1,000 soles de oro. Coins denominated in the new unit were put into circulation from May 1985 and banknotes followed in June of that year.

By 1990, the inti had itself suffered from high inflation. As an interim measure, from January to July 1991, the "inti millón" (I/m.) was used as a unit of account. One inti millón was equal to 1,000,000 intis and hence to one new sol. The nuevo sol ("new sol") was adopted on 1 July 1991, replacing the inti at an exchange rate of a million to one. Thus 1 new sol = 1,000,000 intis = 1,000,000,000 soles de oro.

With the introduction of the new sol, inti banknotes with a face value of 10,000 intis or more remained legal tender until 1992. Inti notes and coins are no longer legal tender in Peru, nor can they be exchanged for notes and coins denominated in the current nuevo sol.

=== Inti millón ===
The inti millón (I/m.) was a unit of account adopted on 1 January 1991, by the Supreme Decree n.º 326-90-EF accepted on 16 December 1990. This unit was in force until 1 July 1991, when it was replaced by the new sol at par. Both prices and accounting records were expressed in millions of Intis with all the zeros removed.

For example: I/. 12453734 = I/.m. 12,45

== Coins ==
Coins were introduced in 1985 in denominations of 1, 5, 10, 20, and 50 centimos (designs were taken from the previous 10, 50, 100, and 500 soles de oro coins), plus 1 and 5 intis. The 1 céntimo coin was issued only in 1985. The 5 céntimo coins were issued until 1986. All the other denominations were issued until 1988. All coins featured Navy Admiral Miguel Grau: cent coins on the reverse, Inti coins on the obverse.

== Banknotes ==
In June 1985, notes were introduced in denominations of I/.10, I/.50 (taken from previous 10,000 and 50,000 soles de oro notes) and I/.100, followed by I/.500 in December of the same year. The next year, I/.1,000 notes were added, followed by I/.5,000 in 1988. I/.10,000, I/.50,000 and I/.100,000 notes were added in 1989. I/.500,000 denominations were added early in 1990, I/.1,000,000 denominations were added in mid-1990, and I/.5,000,000 in August 1990. The last ever Inti note was a second variation of the I./5.000.000 note with overprint over the place of watermark and was printed and issued in 1991, which by the time of printing and issuing was officially I./.m. 5.00. The obverses featured:

- I/.10 - Ricardo Palma, writer
- I/.50 - Nicolás de Piérola, President, finance minister
- I/.100 - Ramón Castilla, President, Army Marshal
- I/.500 - Túpac Amaru II, revolutionary leader
- I/.1,000 - Andrés Avelino Cáceres, President, Army Marshal
- I/.5,000 - Miguel Grau, Navy admiral
- I/.10,000 - César Vallejo, writer
- I/.50,000 - Víctor Raúl Haya de la Torre, politician
- I/.100,000 - Francisco Bolognesi, Army colonel
- I/.500,000 - Ricardo Palma, writer
- I/.1,000,000 - Hipólito Unanue, medical doctor, nationalist
- I/.5,000,000 - Antonio Raimondi, scientist

Banknotes of the Peruvian Inti
Image		Value	Printed	Withdrawn
Obverse	Reverse	Value	Printed	Withdrawn
Ricardo Palma		10 Intis	3 April 1985 (printed by De La Rue) 17 January 1986 (printed by De La Rue) 26 June 1987 (printed by Istituto Poligrafico e Zecca dello Stato)	Late 1991
Nicolás de Piérola		50 Intis	3 April 1985 (printed by De La Rue) 6 March 1986 (printed by De La Rue) 26 June 1987 (printed by Casa da Moeda do Brasil)	Late 1991
Ramón Castilla		100 Intis	1 February 1985 (printed by Casa da Moeda do Brasil) 1 March 1985 (printed by Casa da Moeda do Brasil) 6 March 1986 (printed by Casa da Moeda do Brasil) 26 June 1987 (printed by Bundesdruckerei)	Late 1991
Túpac Amaru II		500 Intis	1 March 1985 (printed by Bundesdruckerei) 6 March 1986 (printed by Fábrica Nacional de Moneda y Timbre) 26 June 1987 (printed by Bundesdruckerei)	Late 1991
Andrés Avelino Cáceres		1,000 Intis	6 March 1986 (printed by De La Rue) 26 June 1987 (printed by De La Rue) 28 June 1988 (printed by De La Rue)	Late 1991
Miguel Grau		5,000 Intis	28 June 1988 (printed by Giesecke & Devrient and Istituto Poligrafico e Zecca dello Stato) 9 September 1988 (printed by De La Rue)	Late 1991
César Vallejo		10,000 Intis	28 June 1988 (first variant, printed by De La Rue) 28 June 1988 (second variant, printed by Istituto Poligrafico e Zecca dello Stato)	mid to late 1992
Víctor Raúl Haya de la Torre		50,000 Intis	28 June 1988 (first variant, printed by De La Rue) 28 June 1988 (second variant, printed by Istituto Poligrafico e Zecca dello Stato)	mid to late 1992
Francisco Bolognesi		100,000 Intis	21 November 1988 (printed by De La Rue) 21 December 1988 (printed by De La Rue) 21 December 1989 (printed by the Bank of Mexico)	mid to late 1992
Ricardo Palma		500,000 Intis	21 November 1988 (printed by De La Rue) 21 December 1988 (printed by De La Rue) 21 December 1989 (printed by the Bank of Mexico)	mid to late 1992
Hipólito Unanue		1,000,000 Intis	5 January 1990 (printed by De La Rue)	mid to late 1992
Antonio Raimondi		5,000,000 Intis	5 January 1990 (printed by the Bank of Mexico)	mid to late 1992
Antonio Raimondi		5,000,000 Intis	16 January 1991 (printed by Istituto Poligrafico e Zecca dello Stato)	mid to late 1992

All banknotes were made by foreign companies and ordered by the Central Reserve Bank of Peru. The name of the printers are seen on the backside of the note on the left side or right side of the down corner of the banknote. The last banknote of the Inti was the 5,000,000 Intis banknote which was first released in 1990, then a second variant(with imprint replacing the watermark) were printed in January 1991 which was the last ever Inti note issued. By 1 July 1991, when the Nuevos Sol was introduced, the majority of the banknotes were worthless, even though they had no worth they were in still circulation and this was mentioned in a document in July 1991, that the banknotes would be still in circulation up until they would be replaced. Banknotes from 10,000 Intis (worth 0,01 Sol) to 5,000,000 Intis (5,00 Soles) were kept in circulation until it was discontinued in 1992, during the government of Alberto Fujimori. Inti notes were last mentioned on 10 July 1992, when the exchange of 100.000, 500.000 and 1.000.000 Intis notes were allowed to be exchanged free of charge as "damaged" up until 31 July 1992. There are no exact dates about the withdrawal of each banknotes, since there are still no documents saying the official withdrawal of the banknotes, the only date is the date of last use, or mention of the banknotes. It is likely that similarly to the Chilean Pesos in 1975, the Peruvian Inti wasn't withdrawn by law officially due to lack of confirming the withdrawal of banknotes.

== See also ==
- Economy of Peru
