= Cabeza de Vaca, Tumbes =

Archaeological site in Peru

Cabeza de Vaca
- Location within Peru
- 3°36′3″S 80°29′30″W
- Location: Peru, Tumbes Region, Tumbes Province

Site notes
- Material: adobe

Cabeza de Vaca is an archaeological site in Peru. It is located in the Tumbes Region, Tumbes Province, Corrales District. Cabeza de Vaca was occupied by Incas. The ruins consisting of buildings, temples, canals and trail. The site is 5 kilometres from Tumbes, Peru.

Its image was used on a commemorative 1 Sol coin in 2016, to represent the Tumbes Region, part of a series titled "Wealth and Pride of Peru".
