= Peruvian sol (1863–1985) =

Former currency of Peru

Sol
sol de oro (Spanish)
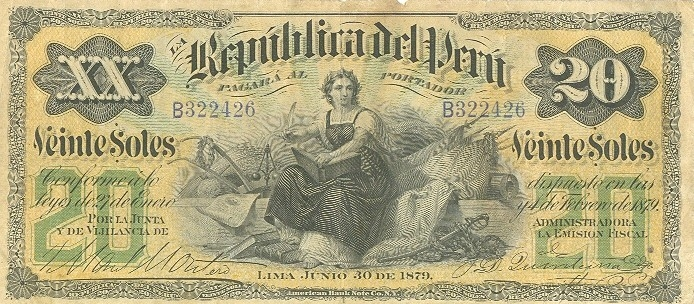
S/. 20 banknote obverse
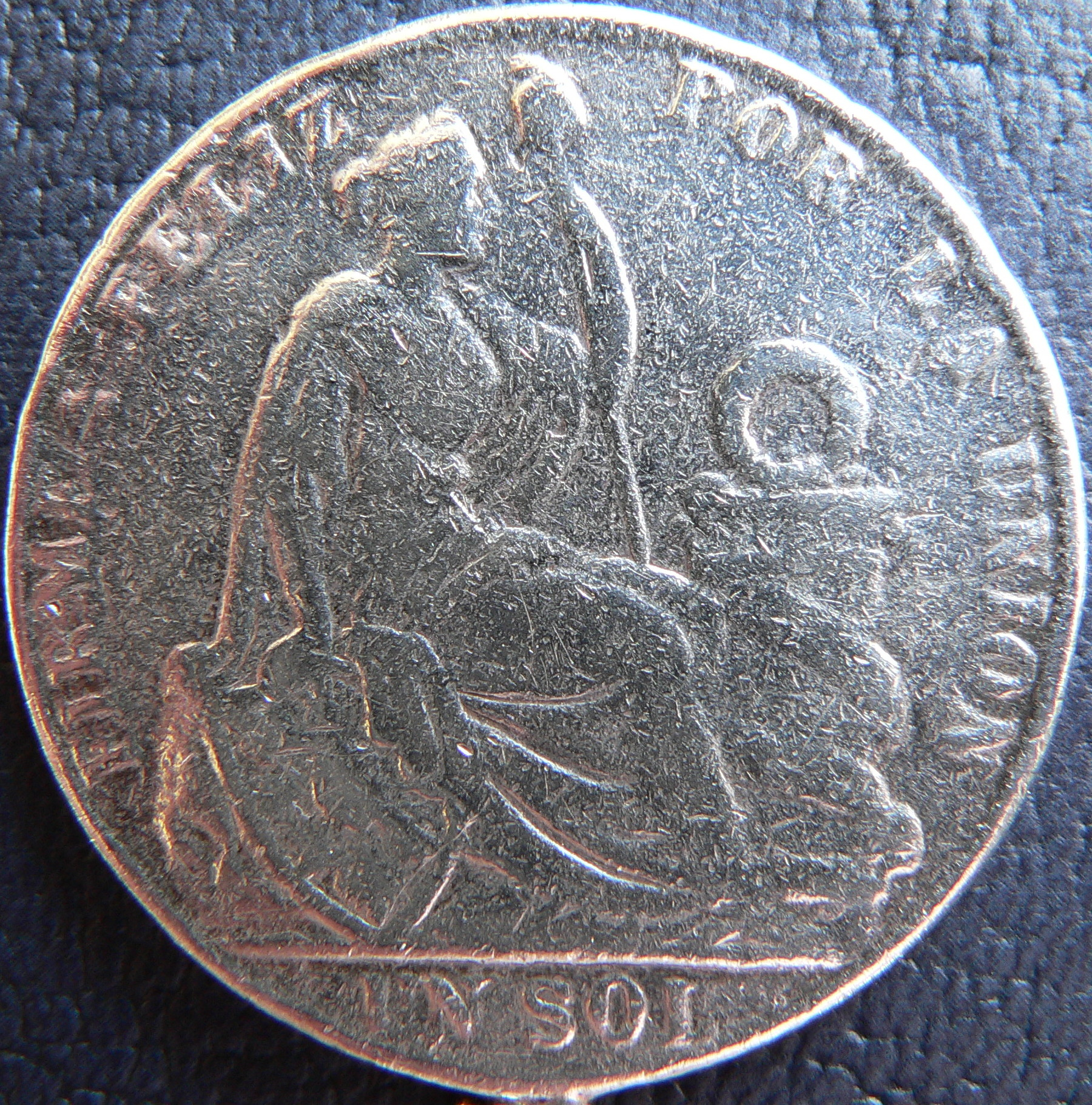
S/. 1 coin reverse

ISO 4217
- Code: PES

Units of account
- Plural: soles
- Symbol: ʃ/. (1863–1898); S/. (1898–1931); S/o (1931–1985)
- Superunit
- 10: inca (1881–1882) pound (1898–1931)
- Subunit
- 1/5: peseta (1880–1882)
- 1/10: dinero
- 1/100: centavo

Denominations
- Banknotes: S/o 1, S/o 2, S/o 5, S/o 10, S/o 20, S/o 50, S/o 100, S/o 200, S/o 500, S/o 1,000, S/o 5,000, S/o 10,000, S/o 50,000
- Coins: 5, 10, 25 centavos, S/o 1/2, S/o 1, S/o 5, S/o 10, S/o 20, S/o 50, S/o 100, S/o 500

Demographics
- Date of introduction: 1863
- Replaced: Peruvian real
- Date of withdrawal: 1985
- Replaced by: Peruvian inti
- User(s): Peru

Issuance
- Central bank: Central Reserve Bank of Peru
- Website: www.bcrp.gob.pe

Valuation
- Pegged with: French franc (1863–1901); Sterling (1901–1930); United States dollar (1930–1985)
- Value: 1000 PES = 1 PEI
- This infobox shows the latest status before this currency was rendered obsolete.

The sol, later sol de oro (English: gold sol), was the currency of Peru between 1863 and 1985. It had the ISO 4217 currency code PES. It was subdivided into 10 dineros or 100 centavos. It also had two different superunits over its circulation life, the inca (1881–1882) and later the gold pound (1898–1931, abbreviated Lp.), both worth 10 soles.

== History ==
The sol was introduced in 1863 when Peru completed its decimalization, replacing the real at a rate of 1 sol = 10 reales. The sol also replaced the Bolivian peso at par, which had circulated in southern Peru. Between 1858 and 1863, coins had been issued denominated in reales, centavos and escudos. The sol was initially pegged to the French franc at a rate of 1 sol = 5 francs (S/. 5.25 to £1 and S/. 1.08 to US$1).

In 1880 and 1881, silver coins denominated in pesetas, were issued, worth 20 centavos to the peseta. In 1881, the inca, worth ten soles, was introduced for use on banknotes. The peg to the franc was replaced in 1901 by a link to sterling at a rate of 10 soles = 1 pound, with gold coins and banknotes issued denominated in pounds (libra in Spanish). This peg was maintained until 1930 when Peru left the gold standard and established an official rate of S/o 2.5 = US$1, a rate which remained until 1946. In 1933, banknotes were issued once more denominated in soles, now called soles de oro. This name also appeared from 1935 on coins, when silver was replaced by base metal.

Fixed exchange rate to the U.S. dollar
| Period | Value of US$1 in soles |
|---|---|
| 1930–1946 | S/o 2.5 |
| 1946–1949 | S/o 2.75 |
| 1949 | S/o 3.5 |
| 1950 | S/o 5 |
| 1951–1953 | S/o 10 |
| 1953–1958 | S/o 19 |
| 1958 | S/o 24.56 |
| 1959 | S/o 27.71 |
| 1960 | S/o 26.76 |
| 1961 | S/o 26.81 |
| 1962–1967 | S/o 26.82 |
| 1967–1975 | S/o 38.7 |

Since 1975, multiple rates to the US dollar have been used.

Due to the chronic inflation that occurred in Peru during the second presidency of Fernando Belaúnde Terry, the sol was replaced in 1985 by the inti at a rate of 1,000 soles = 1 inti. The nuevo sol replaced the inti in 1991, during the administration of Alberto Fujimori, at the rate of 1 million to one (or 1 billion (10^{9}) old sols to 1 nuevo sol).

Sol notes and coins are no longer legal tender in Peru, nor can they be exchanged for notes and coins denominated in the current nuevo sol.

== Coins ==
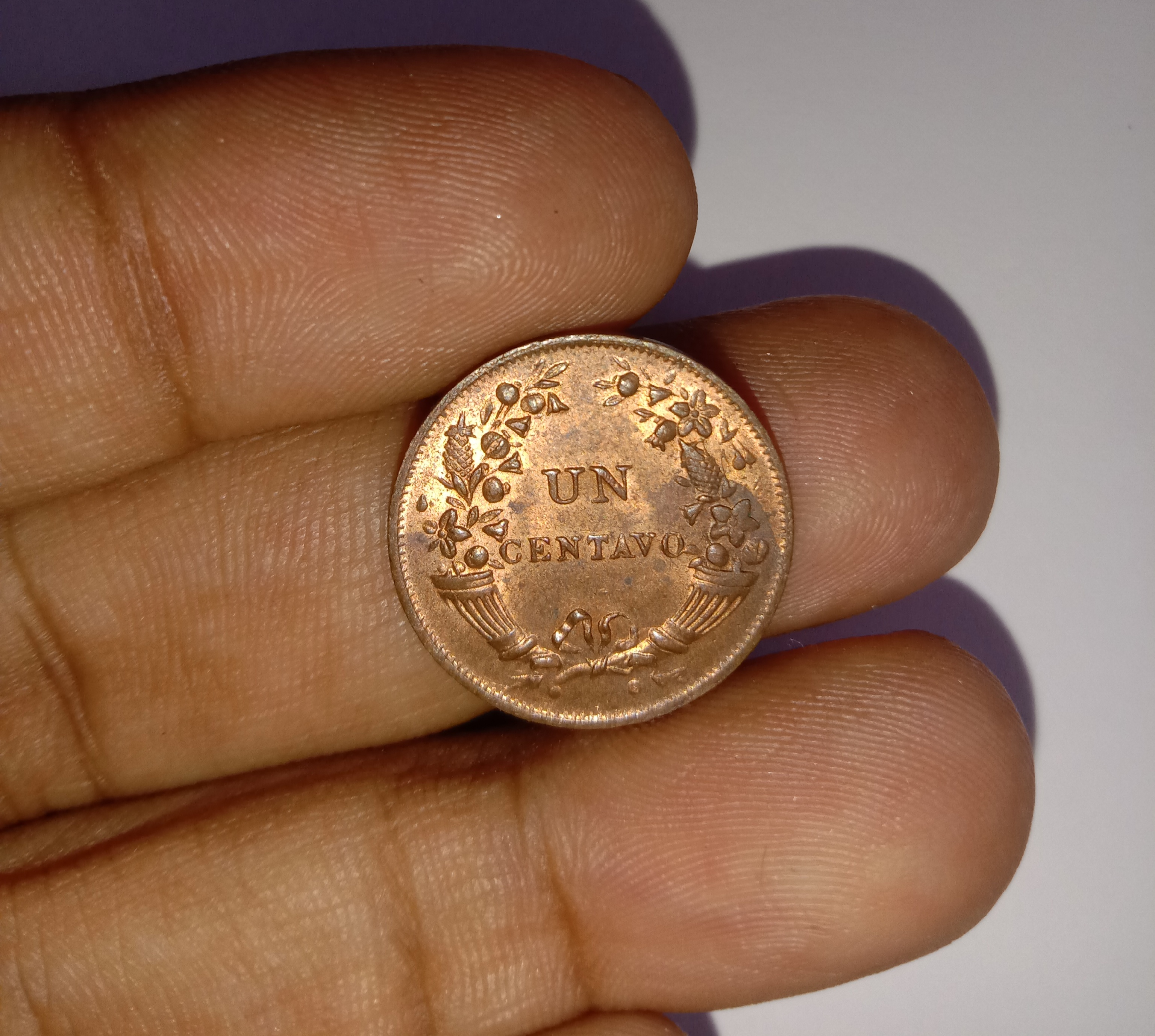
1 Centavo (UN CENTAVO) coin of Republic of Peru (REPUBLICA PERUANA) reverse side. The coin is made of bronze, minted in 1944.

In 1863, cupro-nickel coins for 1 and 2 centavos and .900 silver coins for 1/2 and 1 dinero and 1/5 sol were introduced, followed by .900 silver 1/2 and 1 sol in 1864. Gold 5, 10, and 20 soles were issued only in 1863. In 1875 and 1876, bronze replaced cupro-nickel. In 1879 and 1880, provisional coins were struck in cupro-nickel in denominations of 5, 10, and 20 centavos for replacing the banknotes with coins. In 1898, gold coins for 1 pound (Lp. 1 = 10 soles) were introduced, followed by Lp. 1/2 (5 soles) in 1902 and Lp. 1/5 (2 soles) in 1905. These were issued for circulation until 1930.

In 1918, cupro-nickel 5, 10 and 20 centavos coins were introduced, followed, in 1922 with S/. 1/2 and S/. 1 coins in .500 fineness silver. The silver 1/2, and 1 sol were replaced by brass coins in 1935. Brass 5, 10, and 20 centavos followed in 1942. In 1950, zinc 1 and 2 centavo coins were introduced which were issued until 1958. In 1965, 25 centavo coins were introduced, followed, in 1969, by cupro-nickel S/o 5 and S/o 10.

Production of 5 and 25 centavos ceased in 1975, followed by 10 and 20 centavos in 1976, and 50 centavos in 1977. In 1978, brass replaced cupro-nickel in the S/o 5 and S/o 10 whilst aluminium-bronze S/o 50 and cupro-nickel S/o 100 coins were introduced in 1979 and 1980. The last S/o 1 and S/o 5 coins were issued in 1982 and 1983. In 1984, brass S/o 10, S/o 50, S/o 100 and S/o 500 coins were issued. The last of these pieces was minted in 1985.

== Banknotes ==
The first banknotes were introduced by the private banks. In 1864, Banco La Providencia introduced notes for 5, 20, 40, 80, and 200 soles, with all but the S/. 5 also denominated in pesos (25, 50, 100, and 250 pesos). Later issues of this bank included denominations of 1/2, 1, 2, 4, 5, 8, 10, 20, 50, 100, 500, and 1,000 soles.

Other private banks which issued notes in Peru were:

| Bank | Dates |
|---|---|
| Banco Anglo-Peruana | 1873–1877 |
| Banco de Arequipa | 1871–1874 |
| Banco de la Compañía General del Perú | 1873 |
| Banco de Emisión del Cerro | 1872 |
| Banco Garantizador | 1872–1876 |
| Banco de Lima | 1870–1878 |
| Banco de Londres, Mexico y Sud America | 1866–1875 |
| Banco Nacional del Perú | 1873–1877 |
| Banco del Perú | 1864–1878 |
| Banco de Piura | 1873–1878 |
| Banco de Tacna | 1870s |
| Banco de Trujillo | 1871–1876 |
| Bancodel Valle de Chicama | 1870s |
| Compañia de Obras Públicas y Fomento del Perú | 1876 |
| Monte de Piedad de Lima | 1870s |

Additional denominations to those issued by the Banco La Providencia included 10, 20 and 40 centavos, S/. 25 and S/. 400.

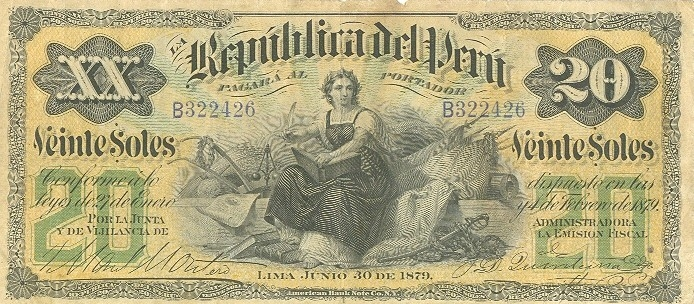
S/. 20 banknote, 1879

In 1879, the government introduced notes for 1, 2, 5, 10, 20, 50, 100, and 500 soles. In 1881, 5 and 100 inca notes were overprinted with the denominations 50 and 1,000 soles. In 1914, bearer cheques were introduced for Lp. 1/2, Lp. 1, Lp. 5, and Lp. 10 (S/. 5, S/. 10, S/. 50 and S/. 100). 1 sol cheques were issued in 1918 whilst, in 1917, gold certificates for 5 and 50 centavos and 1 sol were issued. In 1922, the Reserve Bank of Peru took over paper money production, issuing a final series of pound notes.

In 1933, the Reserve Bank began issuing notes denominated in soles. The first issues were libra notes overprinted with the new denominations of S/o 5, S/o 10, S/o 50 and S/o 100. Regular issues followed in denominations of S/o 1/2, S/o 1, S/o 2, S/o 5, S/o 10, S/o 20, S/o 50 and S/o 100. 50 centavos and S/o 1 were only issued until 1935. S/o 500 notes were introduced in 1946, followed by S/o 200 and S/o 1,000 in 1968. The S/o 5 note was last produced in 1974, with the S/o 10 and S/o 50 being last issued in 1976 and 1977 respectively. That same year, S/o 5,000 notes were introduced. In 1979, S/o 10,000 notes were added, followed by S/o 50,000 in 1981.

== See also ==
- Economy of Peru
