= State Flag Square and Museum of Nakhchivan =

Museum and square in Nakhchivan, Azerbaijan

Coordinates: 39°13′18″N 45°24′04″E

The State Flag Square and Museum of Nakhchivan
- Naxçıvan Bayraq Meydanı Muzeyi
- Established: August 22, 2014
- Location: Nakhchivan, Azerbaijan
- Type: flag and national iconography museum
- Website: bayraqmuzeyi.nmr.az

The State Flag Square and Museum of Nakhchivan (Naxçıvan Bayraq Meydanı Muzeyi) is a museum and square in the city of Nakhchivan of the Nakhchivan Autonomous Republic of Azerbaijan.

== History ==
The museum was established by the decree of the Chairman of the Supreme Parliament of the Nakhchivan Autonomous Republic dated August 22, 2014. The museum has been open to the public since November 17, 2014.

== Architecture and design ==
The museum is located in the highest point of the city of Nakhchivan. The museum, designed around a flagpole, has an octagonal shape. The length of the national flag waving on the square is 20 meters, the width is 10 meters, and the height of the flagpole is 57 meters.

The museum presents a copy of the decree "On State Symbols of the Nakhchivan Autonomous Republic", adopted by the supreme legislative body of the Nakhchivan Autonomous Republic on November 17, 1990, at the initiative of Heydar Aliyev as well as photographs related to that date. Restored flags, coats of arms and administrative maps of historical states, as well as the Nakhichevan Khanate, flags issued to the cavalry units of the Nakhichevan Khanate, military uniforms, constitutions of the Nakhichevan Autonomous Republic adopted in different years, old banknotes, as well as coins minted in Nakhchivan are exhibited in the museum.

== Controversies ==
According to the investigation of Caucasus Heritage Watch, the hill on which the museum is located was an Armenian cemetery that had been destroyed at some point between 1997 and 2005.

The New Armenian Cemetery of Nakhchivan contained between 1000 and 1020 tombstones in the late Soviet period. The tombstones of the cemetery dated to the 18th to 20th centuries. Approximately 400-410 tombstones in the cemetery bore Armenian inscriptions.
