= Francisco Vera Cabeza de Vaca =

Spanish portrait painter

Francisco Vera Cabeza de Vaca (1637 in Calatayud–1700) was a Spanish portrait painter, pupil of J. Martinez and page to Don John of Austria.
