= Peruvian peseta =

Former currency of Peru (1880–82)

peseta peruana (Spanish)
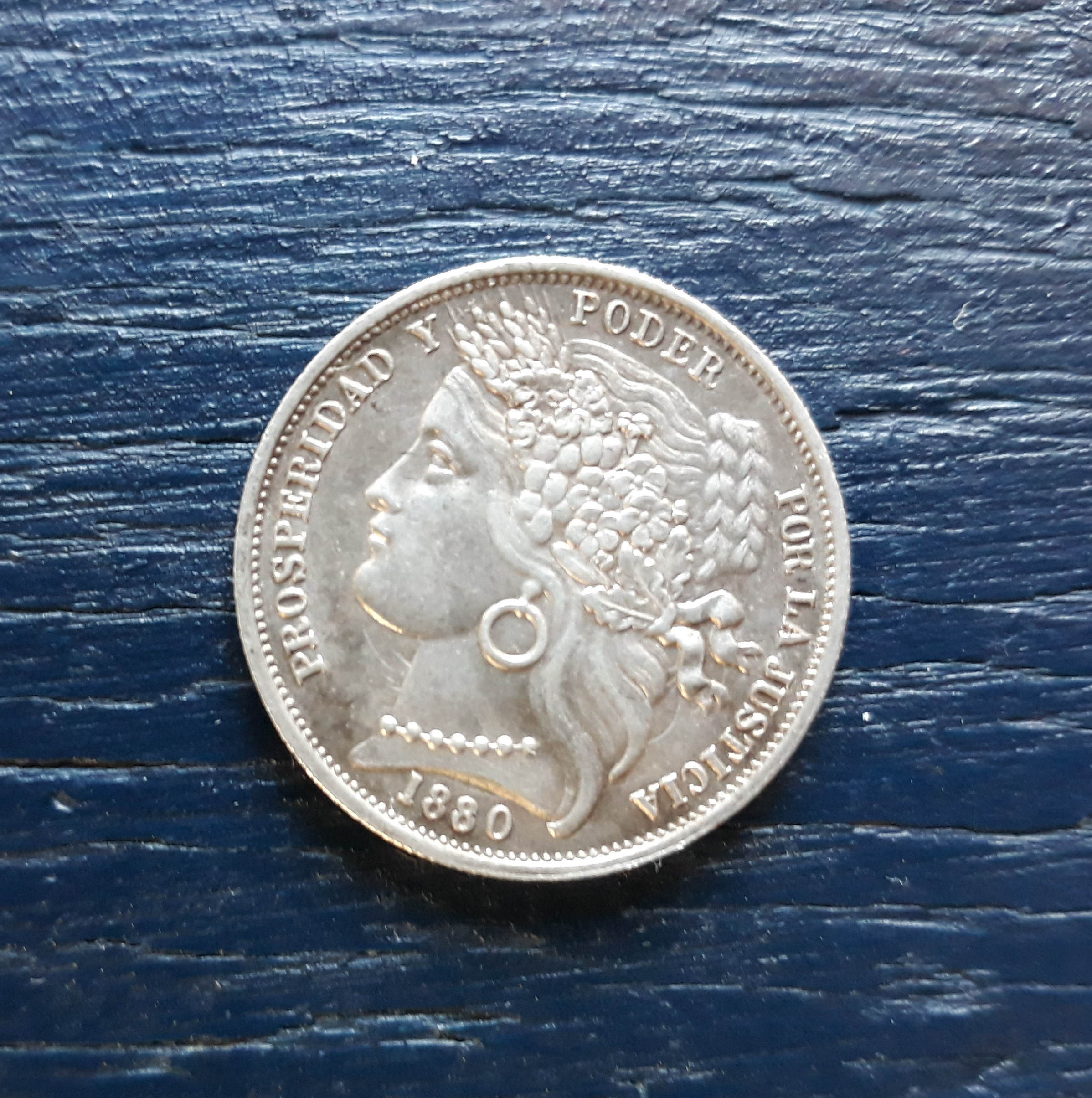

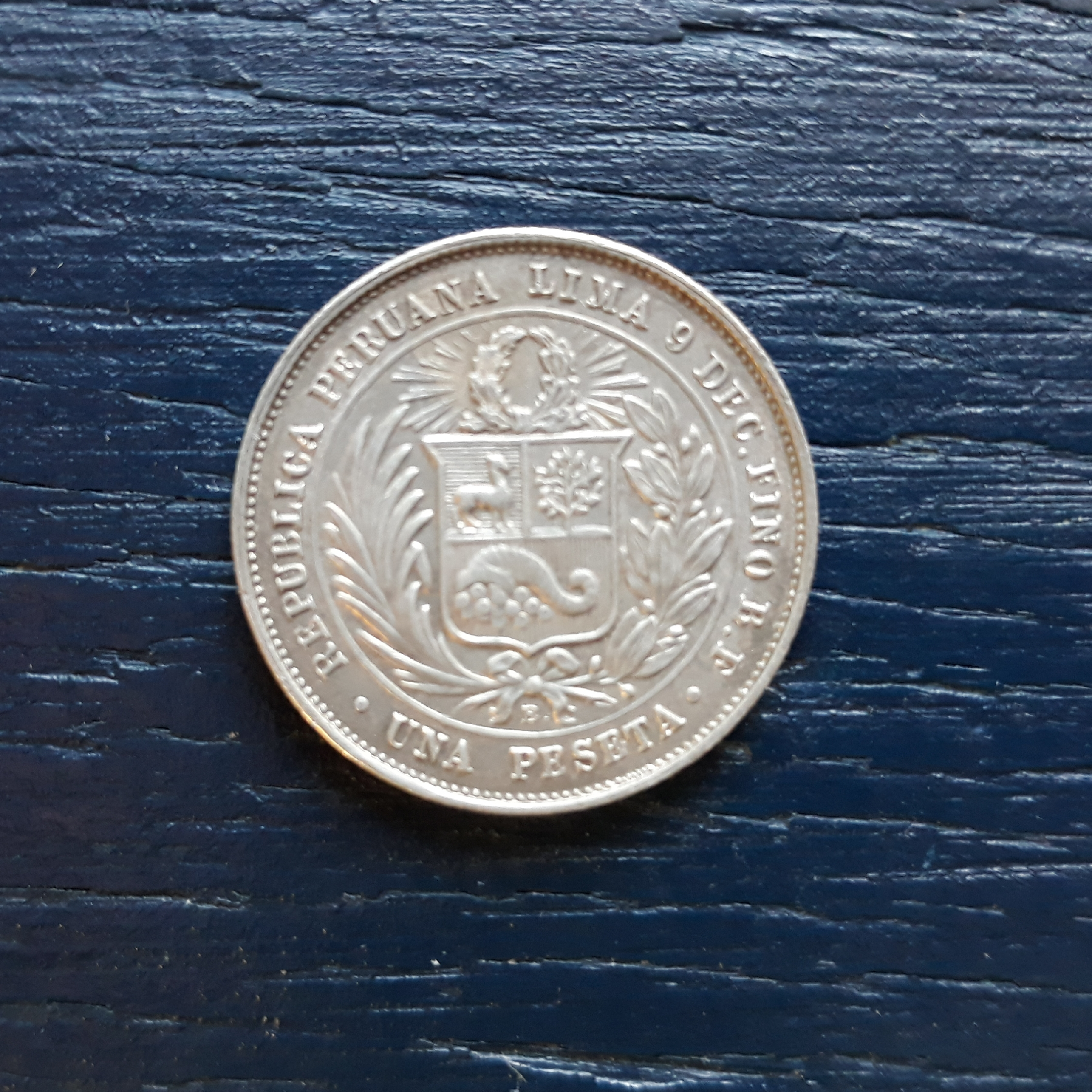

Denominations
- Superunit
- 5: sol
- Subunit
- 1/2: real

Demographics
- Date of introduction: 1880
- Date of withdrawal: 1882
- User(s): Peru

Valuation
- Value: 5 pesetas = 1 sol
- This infobox shows the latest status before this currency was rendered obsolete.

The peseta was a short-lived denomination issued by Peru between 1880 and 1882. The peseta was subdivided into 2 reales, with 5 pesetas equal to 1 sol. The sol continued to be produced during this period and was not replaced by the peseta.

== Coins ==
Silver coins were issued by the Lima mint in 1880 for 1 and 5 pesetas, with further issues of 5 pesetas made in 1881 and 1882 by the Ayacucho mint. A small number of 1/2 real coins was minted in 1882, also at the Ayacucho mint.
