= Peruvian real =

Currency of Peru until 1863

real peruano (Spanish)
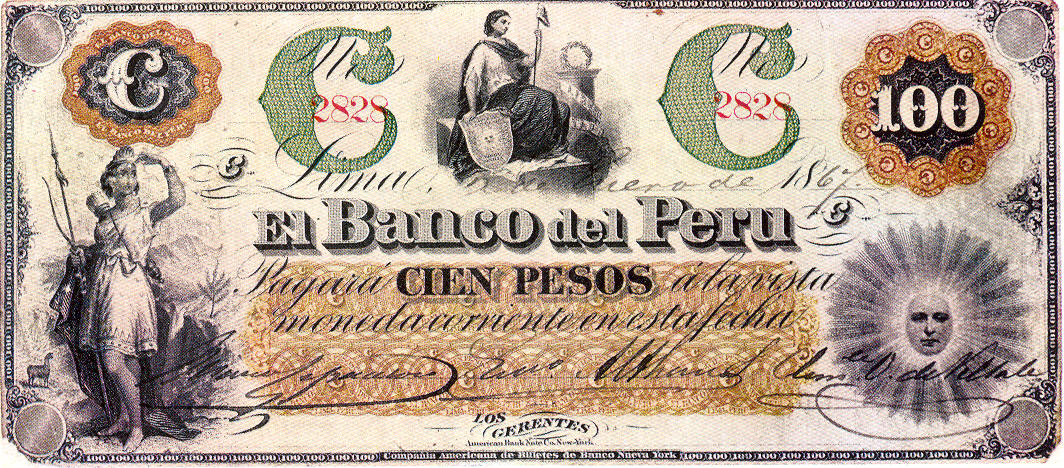
100-peso banknote obverse (1867)
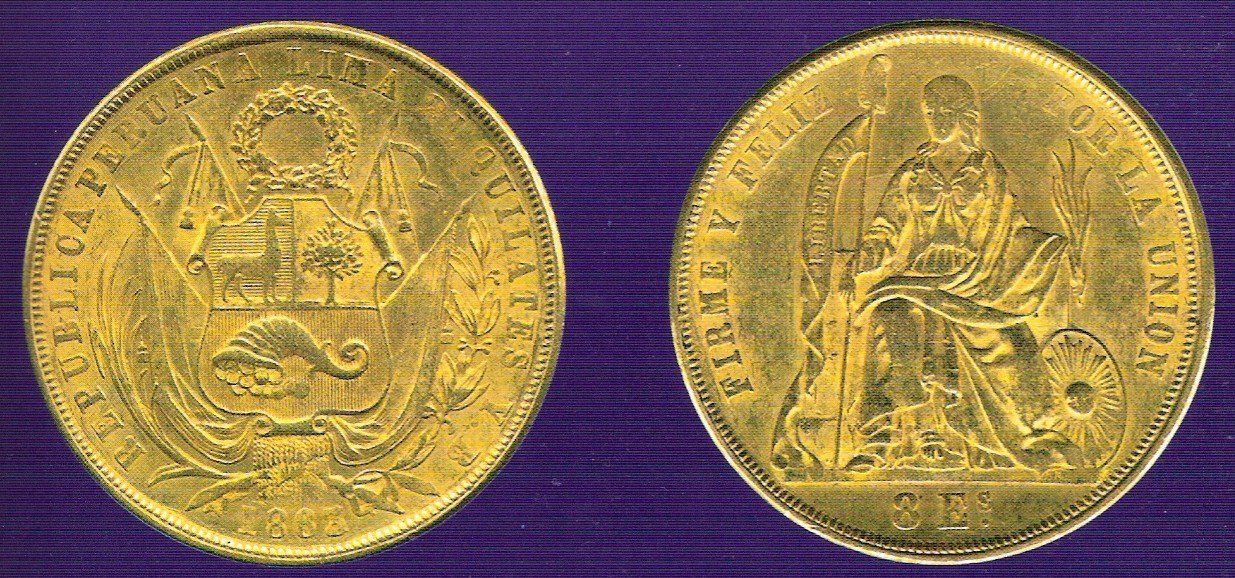
8-escudo coin (1863)

Unit
- Plural: reales

Denominations
- Superunit
- 16: escudo
- 8: peso

Demographics
- Date of withdrawal: 1863
- Replaced by: Peruvian sol
- User(s): Peru

Valuation
- Value: 10 reales = 1 sol
- This infobox shows the latest status before this currency was rendered obsolete.

The real was the currency of Peru until 1863. Sixteen silver reales equalled one gold escudo. The silver coin of 8 reales was also known as the peso.

== History ==
Initially, the Spanish colonial real was minted. This was replaced by Peruvian currency following liberation in 1826, although the first issues of the Peruvian Republic were made in 1822. The real was replaced in 1863 by the sol at a rate of 1 sol = 10 reales.

== Coins ==
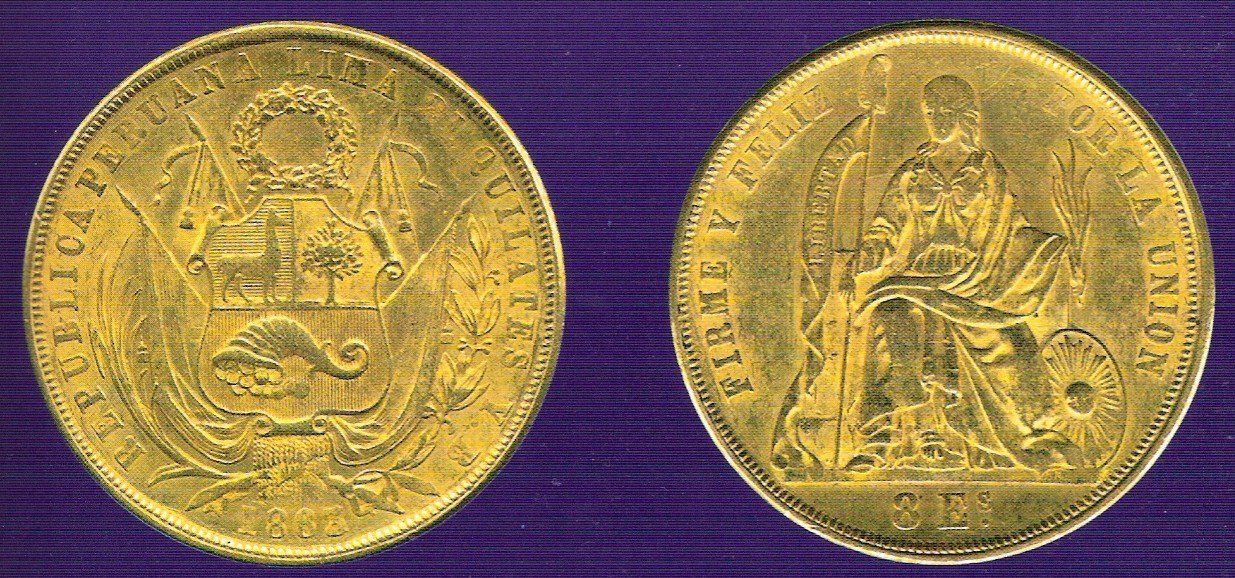
Gold 8 escudos. Left: Reverse with the coat of arms of Peru. Right: Obverse with a woman over the denomination 8E.

During the colonial period, silver coins were minted in denominations of 1/4, 1/2, 1, 2, 4 and 8 reales, with gold coins for 1/2, 1, 2, 4 and 8 escudos. In 1822, a provisional coinage was issued in the name of the Republic of Peru in denominations of 1/4 real, 1/8 and 1/4 peso (equal to 1 and 2 reales) and 8 reales. Except for the silver 8 reales, these coins were minted in copper. From 1826, a regular coinage was issued which consisted of the same silver and gold denominations as had been issued during the colonial period.

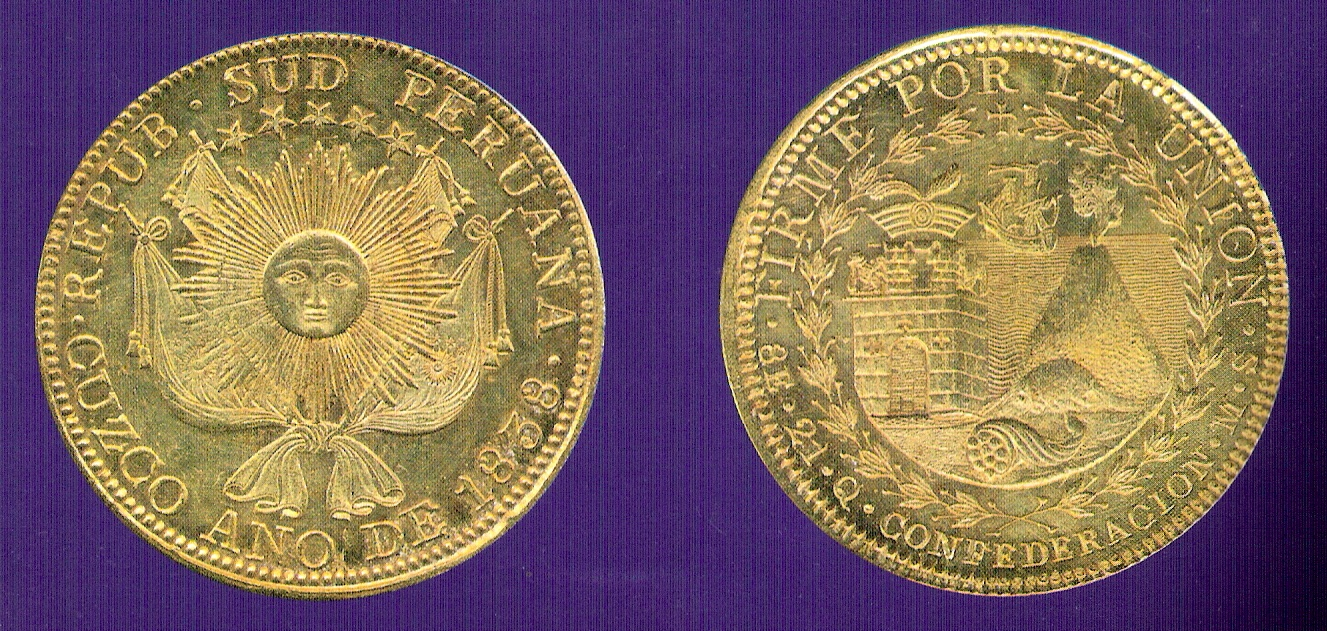
Gold 8 escudos from South Peru. Left: Reverse with coat of arms of the Peru-Bolivian Confederation. Right: Obverse with the image of Sacsayhuamán, the denomination 8E and the state motto: "Firme por la Unión".

During the period 1836-1839, when Peru was part of the Peru-Bolivian Confederation, the States and then Republics of North and South Peru issued their own coins. North Peru issued 1/2, 1, and 8 reales, 1/2, 1, 2, 4 and 8 escudos whilst South Peru issued 1/2, 2, 4 and 8 reales, 1/2, 1 and 8 escudos.

In 1856, production of all coins ceased. Smaller 1/2 and 1 real coins were introduced in 1858 and 1859, respectively, along with 50 centimos in 1858 and then 25 and 50 centavos in 1859. Redesigned 4 and 8 reales coins were minted in 1862 and 1863. This transitional phase of coinage was replaced by a fully decimalized system in 1863.

== Banknotes ==
=== Auxiliary Bank of Paper Money ===
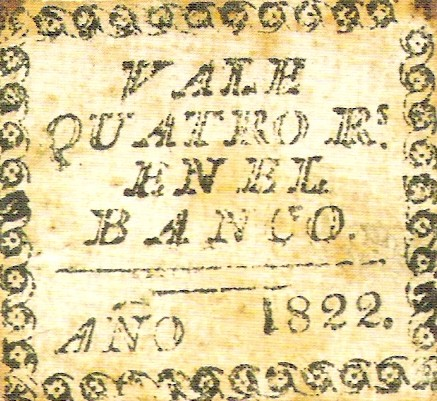
Banknote for 4 reales (Quatro R^{s}) of 1822.

Under the Protectoral Decree of General José de San Martín on December 14, 1821, the Emisión Bank was created, better known as the Bank of Emancipation (Banco de la Emancipación). It started to operate on February 7, 1822 but was closed by a decree of President José de la Riva Agüero on June 4, 1823, with public burning of the bills. The bank issued notes for 2 and 4 reales and 1 peso (8 reales).

=== Private Banks ===
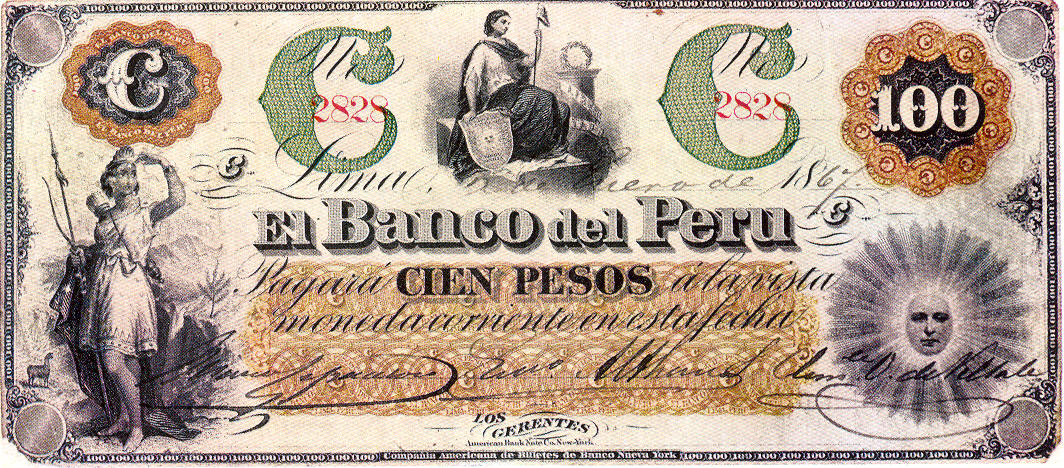
100 pesos note of the Bank of Peru, put into circulation in 1863 and recalled in 1864.

The first private bank founded in Peru was the Banco La Providencia in September 1862. Between July 1863 and 1866, notes were issued for 5, 10, 25, 50, 100, 200 and 500 pesos. After 1867, the notes for 25 and 100 pesos were exchanged for 20 and 80 soles respectively.

The Banco del Perú (Bank of Peru) was established on May 23, 1863 and from August of the same year issued notes for 5, 10, 100 and 500 pesos. Since 1867, this bank has issued notes denominated in soles.

The London and South American Bank (later the London Bank of Mexico and South America) was a British bank founded in London in 1863 which opened its first subsidiary in August 1863 in Lima. It became the principal bank in South America and issued notes for 5, 25, 100 and 1000 pesos.
