= Flag Square, Lima =

Public square in Lima, Peru

Coordinates: 12.0675°S 77.0612°W

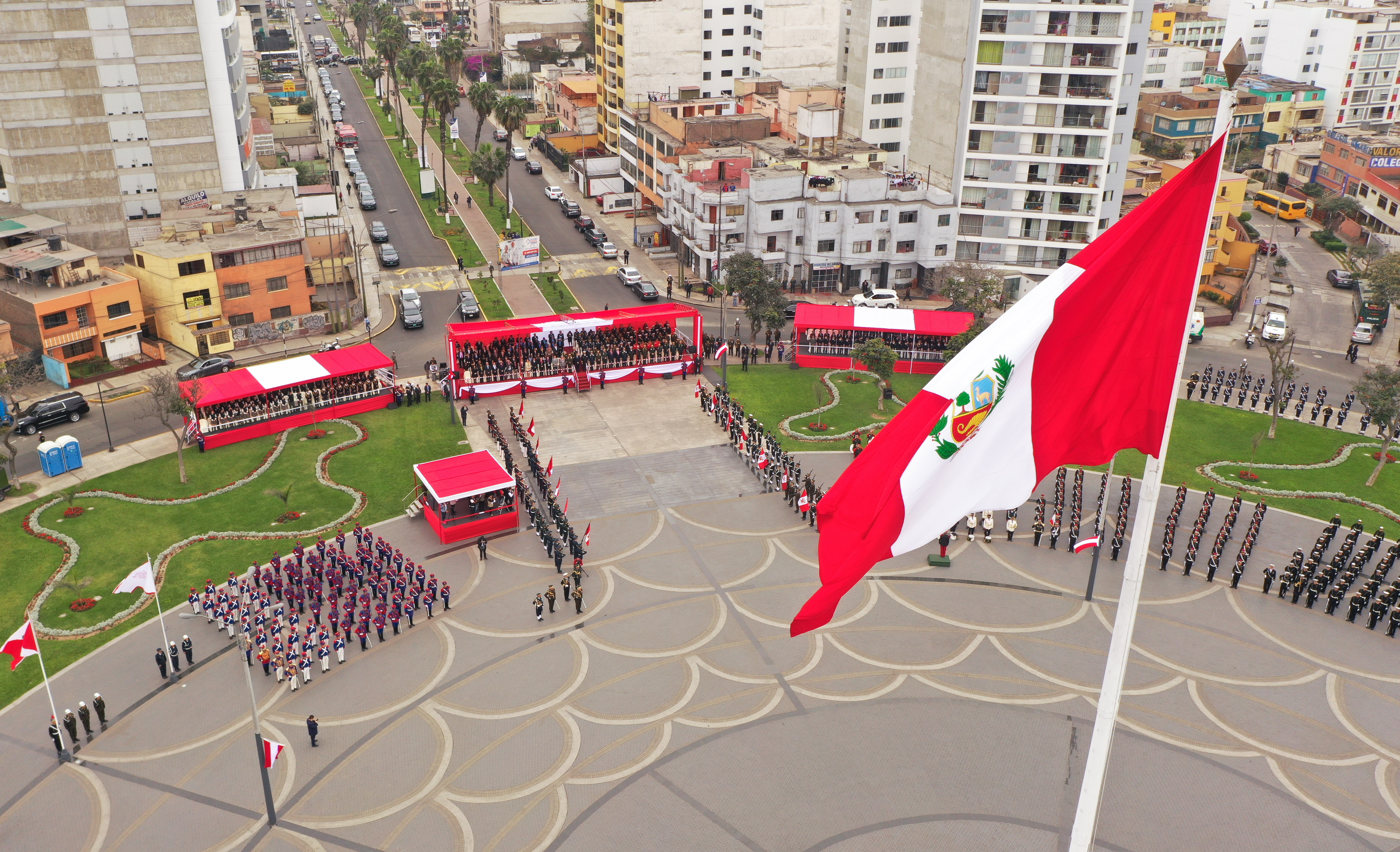
Celebrations at the square in 2020.

The Flag Square (Spanish: Plaza de la Bandera) is a public square in Lima, Peru. It is located next to the Mateo Salado Huaca at the intersection of Breña, Lima and Pueblo Libre districts.

== History ==
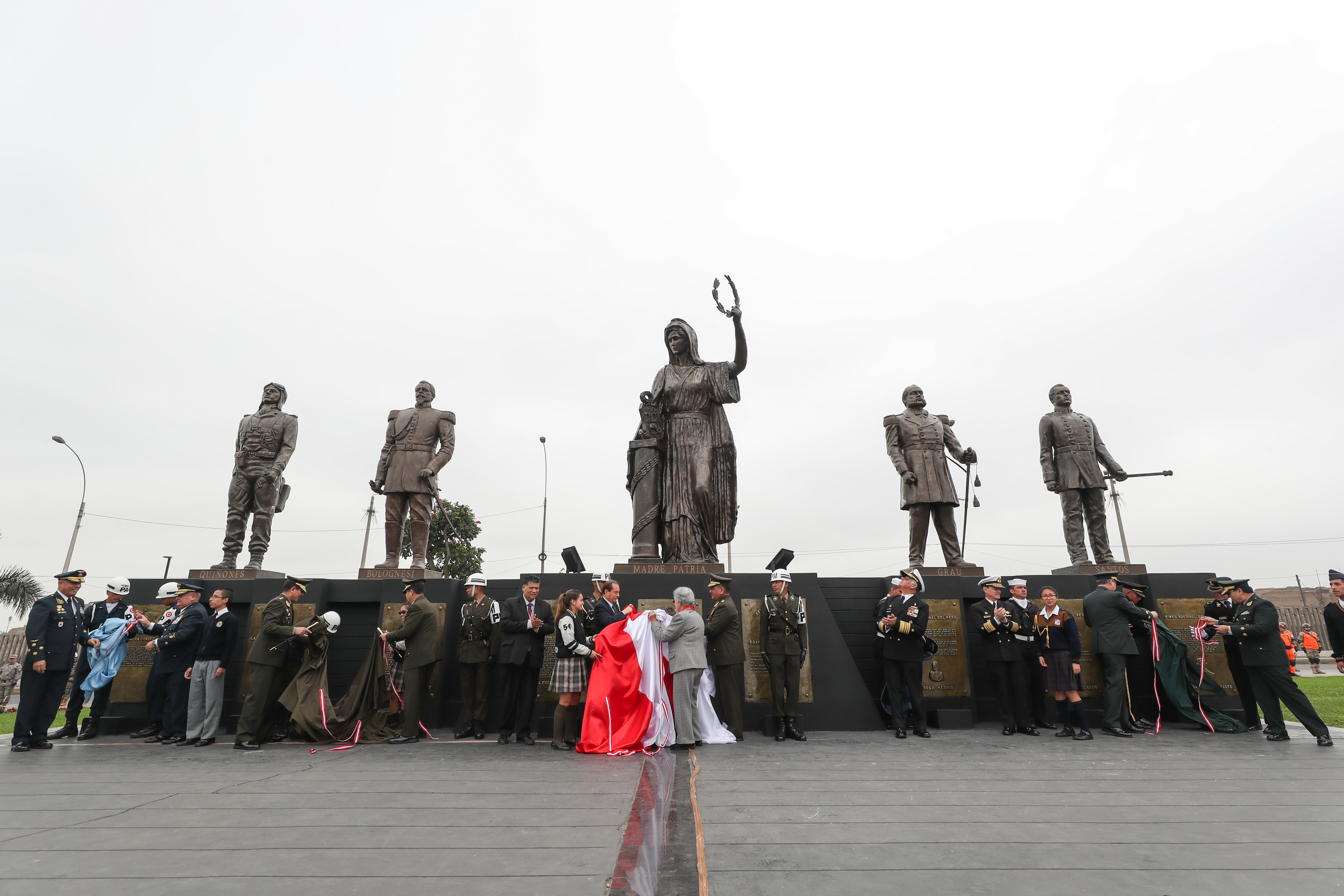
Effigies at the square.

The works for the construction of the space began in 1978, with the participation of the residents of the Parque San Martín urbanization in Pueblo Libre headed by Catalina Ciccia Ciccia de Chávez. It was inaugurated coincidentally on the day of creation of the first flag of Peru on October 21, 1980, with the presence of then president Fernando Belaúnde Terry. Prior to the works, the area was occupied by a market.

The oval-shaped square was remodelled by the Municipality of Lima in 2017, with the earthen slopes being replaced by a flatter area with gardens, concrete steps and a central flagpole. In 2019, during the ceremony of the 199th anniversary of the first flag of Peru, an effigy of the Peruvian Motherland and statues of the heroes of the four branches of the Armed Forces of Peru were unveiled: Francisco Bolognesi (Army), Miguel Grau (Navy), José Quiñones (Air Force) and Mariano Santos Mateo (Police).

The square has been the scene of various official civic events since 1980. One of them is the daily raising, from Monday to Saturday, of a large national flag. On Sundays, larger national flag is raised by the Peruvian Armed Forces, on a 40 m high flagpole.

== See also ==
- Flag of Peru
