= Julio Velarde =

Peruvian banker

Julio Velarde OSP
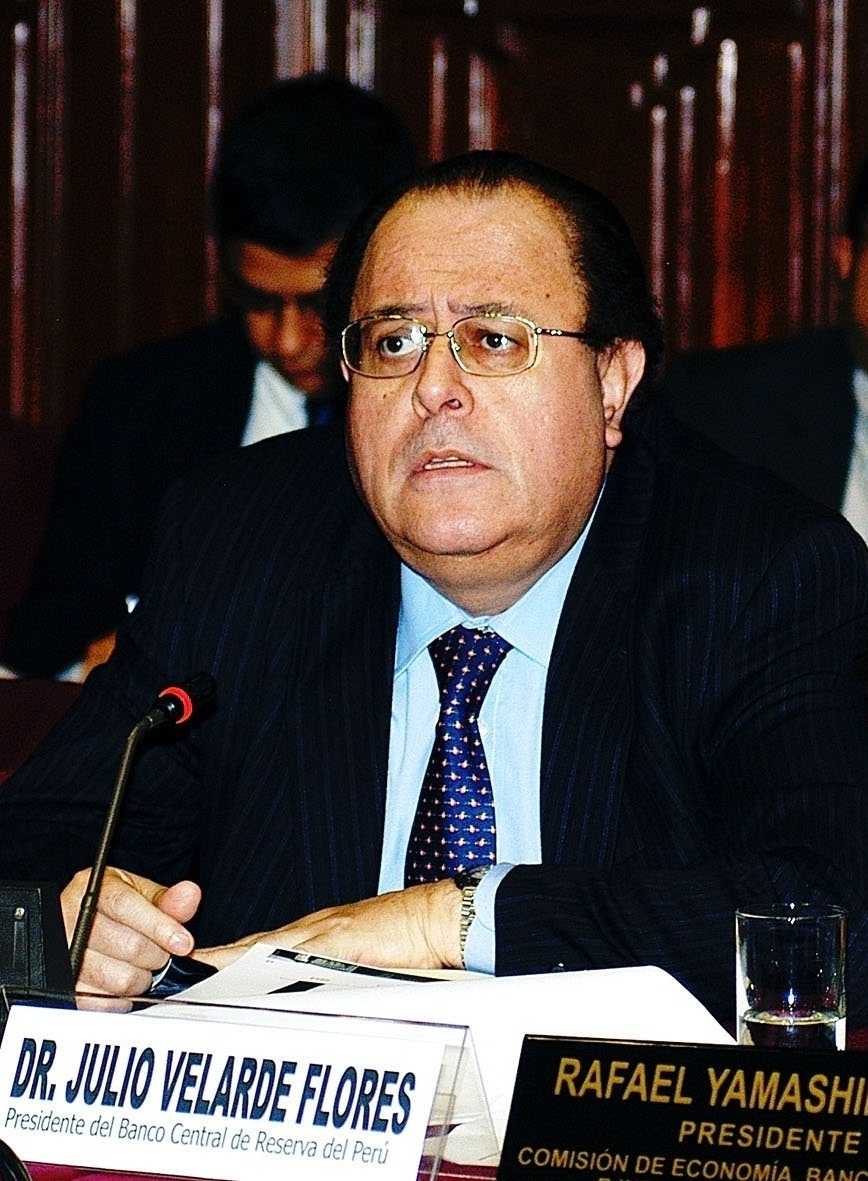
- Velarde in 2010

31st President of the Central Reserve Bank of Peru
- Incumbent
- Assumed office 7 September 2006
- President: See list: Alan García; Ollanta Humala; Pedro Pablo Kuczynski; Martín Vizcarra; Manuel Merino; Francisco Sagasti; Pedro Castillo; Dina Boluarte; José Jerí; José María Balcázar; Keiko Fujimori
- Preceded by: Óscar Dancourt

Member of the Central Reserve Bank of Peru Board of Directors
- In office 22 August 2001 – 2 March 2004
- Appointed by: Alejandro Toledo
- Succeeded by: Luis Carranza
- In office 6 September 1990 – 25 April 1992
- Appointed by: Peruvian Senate

Personal details
- Born: Julio Emilio Velarde Flores; 30 June 1952 (age 74) Lima, Peru
- Party: Christian People's Party
- Education: Universidad del Pacífico (BA); Brown University (MA)
- Occupation: Banker

Julio Emilio Velarde Flores (born 30 June 1952) is a Peruvian banker who has been the President of the Central Reserve Bank of Peru since 7 September 2006.

== Biography ==
Velarde attended Universidad del Pacífico, where he gained a B.A. in economics graduating first of his class in 1974. He obtained an M.A. from Brown University in 1977 and is a PhD candidate from the same university. Later, he made advanced studies of economics at the Kiel Institute for the World Economy in 1990.

Between 1978 and 1983 Velarde worked as researcher and associate professor of economics at Universidad del Pacífico. In the 1980s he served successively as Manager of the Bank of Industry, Economic Advisor to the Minister of Industry and Financial Manager of the Central Mortgage Bank of Peru. In 1990 he was appointed member of the Board of Governors of the Central Reserve Bank and Advisor to the Minister of Finance and from 1993 to 1999 he held senior positions at the National Institute for the Defense of Free Competition and the Protection of Intellectual Property, Financing Bank and Bank of Commerce.

Since 1986 he was a senior researcher and professor at Universidad del Pacífico. Head of the Department of Economics from 1994 to 1997, he was briefly Dean of the Faculty of Economics in 2003. Velarde was again member of the Board of Governors of the Central Reserve Bank between 2001 and 2003. This year he was named Executive President of the Latin American Reserve Fund, a post he held until 2006.

Associated with the Christian Popular Party (PPC), he was head of the government planning committee for the Lourdes Flores presidential campaign in the 2006 general election. Although his party lost the election, Velarde was nominated by the government to replace Óscar Dancourt as President of the Central Reserve Bank and elected by Congress on 7 September 2006. He has been ratified in office to exercise new terms after the elections of 2011, 2016 and 2021.

He has been named Central Banker of the Year 2015 by The Banker, Central Bank Governor of the Year 2016 by LatinFinance, Best Central Banker of 2015 and 2016 by Global Finance and Central Banker of the Year 2020 for the Americas by The Banker. He was appointed Knight Grand Cross of the Order of the Sun of Peru on 26 July 2011.
