= Peruvian sol =

Currency of Peru

Sol Peruano (Spanish)
- series 2021

ISO 4217
- Code: PEN (numeric: 604) before: PEH, PEI, PES
- Subunit: 0.01

Units of account
- Plural: soles
- Symbol: S/
- Subunit
- 1/100: céntimo
- Plural
- céntimo: céntimos

Denominations
- Banknotes
- Freq. used: S/10, S/20, S/50, S/100
- Rarely used: S/200
- Coins
- Freq. used: 10, 20, 50 céntimos, S/1, S/2, S/5

Demographics
- Date of introduction: July 1, 1991
- Replaced: Peruvian inti
- User(s): Peru, Bolivia (unofficial)

Issuance
- Central bank: Central Reserve Bank of Peru
- Website: www.bcrp.gob.pe
- Printer: Perum Peruri
- Website: www.peruri.co.id
- Mint: National Mint (Casa Nacional de Moneda)

Valuation
- Inflation: 1.9%
- Source: January 2014

The sol (Spanish pronunciation: [sol]; plural: soles; currency sign: S/) is the currency of Peru; it is subdivided into 100 céntimos ("cents"). The ISO 4217 currency code is PEN.

The sol replaced the Peruvian inti in 1991 and the name is a return to that of Peru's historic currency, as the previous incarnation of sol was in use from 1863 to 1985. Although sol in this usage is derived from the Latin solidus (lit. 'solid'), the word also means "sun" in Spanish. There is thus a continuity with the old Peruvian inti, which was named after Inti, the Sun God of the Incas.

At its introduction in 1991, the currency was officially called nuevo sol ("new sol"), until November 13, 2015, when Peru's Congress voted to rename the currency simply sol.

== History ==
Currencies in use before the current Peruvian sol include:

- The Spanish colonial real from the 16th to 19th centuries, with 8 reales equal to 1 peso.
- The Peruvian real from 1822 to 1863. Initially worth 1/8 peso, reales worth 1/10 peso were introduced in 1858 in their transition to a decimal currency system.
- The sol or sol de oro from 1863 to 1985, at 1 sol = 10 reales.
- The inti from 1985 to 1991, at 1 inti = 1,000 soles de oro.

Due to the bad state of economy and hyperinflation in the late 1980s, the government was forced to abandon the inti and introduce the sol as the country's new currency. The new currency was put into use on July 1, 1991, by Law No. 25,295, to replace the inti at a rate of 1 sol to 1,000,000 intis, or one inti millón. All inti coins and banknotes with a face value below 10,000 intis were demonetized. Coins denominated in the new unit were introduced on October 1, 1991, and the first banknotes on November 13, 1991. The remaining banknotes denominated in intis ceased to be legal tender after 1992. Since that time, the sol has retained an inflation rate of 1.5%, the lowest ever in either South America or Latin America as a whole. Since the new currency was put into effect, it has managed to maintain an exchange rate between S/2.2 and S/4.13 per US dollar.

== Coins ==
Coin were introduced in 1991 in denominations of 1, 5, 10, 20, and 50 céntimos and S/1. Coins for S/2 and S/5 were added in 1994. The one-céntimo and five-céntimo coins fell out of use and the one-céntimo was removed from circulation on May 1, 2011, followed by the five-céntimos on January 1, 2019. (For cash transactions retailers must round down to the nearest ten céntimos or up to the nearest five. Electronic transactions continue to be processed at the exact amount.)

All coins show the coat of arms of Peru surrounded by the text Banco Central de Reserva del Perú ("Central Reserve Bank of Peru") on the obverse; the reverse of each coin shows its denomination. Included in the designs of the bimetallic S/2 and S/5 coins are the hummingbird and condor figures from the Nazca Lines.

Image	Value	Diameter (mm)	Thickness (mm)	Mass (g)	Composition	Edge
	10 céntimos	20.5	1.26	3.50	Brass	Smooth
	20 céntimos	23	1.26	4.40	Brass	Smooth
	50 céntimos	22	1.65	5.45	Cu–Zn–Ni	Reeded
	S/1	25.5	1.65	7.32	Cu–Zn–Ni	Reeded
	S/2	22.2	2.07	5.62	Bimetallic; Outside ring: Steel; Centre: Cu–Zn–Ni	Smooth
	S/5	24.3	2.13	6.67	Bimetallic; Outside ring: Steel; Centre: Cu–Zn–Ni	Reeded (since 2009)

== Banknotes ==
Banknotes for S/10, S/20, S/50, and S/100 were introduced in 1991. The banknote for S/200 was introduced in August 1995. All notes are of the same size (140 × 65 mm) and contain the portrait of a well-known historic Peruvian on the obverse.

A new series of banknotes was issued starting in 2021, beginning with the S/10 and S/100 notes in July 2021 and followed by the S/20 and S/50 notes in July 2022. A S/200 note was released in December 2023.

During the currency's 30 year past, several series of banknotes were introduced:

The first one being the first Nuevos Sol series first introduced in November 1991 with the 10 and 20 Nuevos Soles banknotes in parallel with coins while higher denonimation banknotes were introduced gradually (50 Nuevos Soles on 22 April 1992, 100 Nuevos Soles on 22 July 1992 and finally 200 Nuevos Soles on 29 August 1997):

First Nuevos Sol Series(1991–2006)
Images		Value	Printed by	Year(date)	Changes
Obverse	Reverse	Value	Printed by	Year(date)	Changes
José Abelardo Quiñones Gonzáles	Image of an inverted flight featured by Quiñones	10 Nuevos Soles	De La Rue	1 February 1991	First banknote introduced on 13 November 1991.
José Abelardo Quiñones Gonzáles	Image of an inverted flight featured by Quiñones	10 Nuevos Soles	Istituto Poligrafico e Zecca dello Stato	10 September 1992	No changes.
José Abelardo Quiñones Gonzáles	Image of an inverted flight featured by Quiñones	10 Nuevos Soles	De La Rue	16 June 1994	No changes.
José Abelardo Quiñones Gonzáles	Image of an inverted flight featured by Quiñones	10 Nuevos Soles	Giesecke+Devrient	20 April 1995	No changes.
José Abelardo Quiñones Gonzáles	Image of an inverted flight featured by Quiñones	10 Nuevos Soles	Istituto Poligrafico e Zecca dello Stato	25 April 1996	No changes.
José Abelardo Quiñones Gonzáles	Image of an inverted flight featured by Quiñones	10 Nuevos Soles	American Banknote Corporation	11 June 1997	Color changing circles sprinkled all over the note to prevent counterfeiting.
José Abelardo Quiñones Gonzáles	Image of an inverted flight featured by Quiñones	10 Nuevos Soles	American Banknote Corporation	6 August 1998	Color changing circles sprinkled all over the note to prevent counterfeiting.
José Abelardo Quiñones Gonzáles	Image of an inverted flight featured by Quiñones	10 Nuevos Soles	American Banknote Corporation	20 May 1999	Color changing circles sprinkled all over the note to prevent counterfeiting.
José Abelardo Quiñones Gonzáles	Image of an inverted flight featured by Quiñones	10 Nuevos Soles	Oberthur Fiduciaire	1 March 2001	Color changing denonimation on the right side.
José Abelardo Quiñones Gonzáles	Image of an inverted flight featured by Quiñones	10 Nuevos Soles	De La Rue	27 September 2001	Color changing denonimation on the right side.
José Abelardo Quiñones Gonzáles	Image of an inverted flight featured by Quiñones	10 Nuevos Soles	Oberthur Fiduciaire	11 August 2005	Slightly improved color changing denonimation on the right side.
José Abelardo Quiñones Gonzáles	Image of an inverted flight featured by Quiñones	10 Nuevos Soles	Oberthur Fiduciaire	21 December 2006	Slightly improved color changing denonimation on the right side.
San Marcos University, Raül Porras Barrenechea	Palacio de Torre Tagle	20 Nuevos Soles	De La Rue	1 February 1991	First banknote introduced on 13 November 1991.
San Marcos University, Raül Porras Barrenechea	Palacio de Torre Tagle	20 Nuevos Soles	Istituto Poligrafico e Zecca dello Stato	25 June 1992	No changes.
San Marcos University, Raül Porras Barrenechea	Palacio de Torre Tagle	20 Nuevos Soles	De La Rue	16 June 1994	No changes.
San Marcos University, Raül Porras Barrenechea	Palacio de Torre Tagle	20 Nuevos Soles	Giesecke+Devrient	20 April 1995	No changes.
San Marcos University, Raül Porras Barrenechea	Palacio de Torre Tagle	20 Nuevos Soles	Istituto Poligrafico e Zecca dello Stato	25 April 1996	No changes.
San Marcos University, Raül Porras Barrenechea	Palacio de Torre Tagle	20 Nuevos Soles	Istituto Poligrafico e Zecca dello Stato	11 June 1997	Color changing circles sprinkled all over the note to prevent counterfeiting.
San Marcos University, Raül Porras Barrenechea	Palacio de Torre Tagle	20 Nuevos Soles	British American Bank Note	6 August 1998	Color changing denonimation on the right side.
San Marcos University, Raül Porras Barrenechea	Palacio de Torre Tagle	20 Nuevos Soles	Fabrica Nacional de Moneda y Timbre	20 May 1999	Color changing denonimation on the right side.
San Marcos University, Raül Porras Barrenechea	Palacio de Torre Tagle	20 Nuevos Soles	British American Bank Note	12 October 2000	Color changing denonimation on the right side.
San Marcos University, Raül Porras Barrenechea	Palacio de Torre Tagle	20 Nuevos Soles	Oberthur Fiduciaire	27 September 2001	Slightly improved color changing denonimation on the right.
San Marcos University, Raül Porras Barrenechea	Palacio de Torre Tagle	20 Nuevos Soles	Oberthur Fiduciaire	28 October 2004	Slightly improved color changing denonimation on the right.
San Marcos University, Raül Porras Barrenechea	Palacio de Torre Tagle	20 Nuevos Soles	Oberthur Fiduciaire	21 December 2006	Slightly improved color changing denonimation on the right.
Abraham Valdelomar Pinto	Huacachina lagoon	50 Nuevos Soles	Istituto Poligrafico e Zecca dello Stato	1 February 1991	Introduced on 22 April 1992
Abraham Valdelomar Pinto	Huacachina lagoon	50 Nuevos Soles	Istituto Poligrafico e Zecca dello Stato	25 June 1992	Introduced on 22 April 1992
Abraham Valdelomar Pinto	Huacachina lagoon	50 Nuevos Soles	Istituto Poligrafico e Zecca dello Stato	16 June 1994	Color changing denonimation on the right side.
Abraham Valdelomar Pinto	Huacachina lagoon	50 Nuevos Soles	Istituto Poligrafico e Zecca dello Stato	20 April 1995	Color changing denonimation on the right side.
Abraham Valdelomar Pinto	Huacachina lagoon	50 Nuevos Soles	Istituto Poligrafico e Zecca dello Stato	11 June 1997	Color changing circles sprinkled all over the note to prevent counterfeiting.
Abraham Valdelomar Pinto	Huacachina lagoon	50 Nuevos Soles	British American Bank Note	6 August 1998	Color changing circles sprinkled all over the note to prevent counterfeiting.
Abraham Valdelomar Pinto	Huacachina lagoon	50 Nuevos Soles	De La Rue	20 May 1999	Color changing circles sprinkled all over the note to prevent counterfeiting.
Abraham Valdelomar Pinto	Huacachina lagoon	50 Nuevos Soles	Royal Joh. Enschedé	27 September 2001	No changes.
Abraham Valdelomar Pinto	Huacachina lagoon	50 Nuevos Soles	Bundesdruckerei	11 August 2005	Slightly improved color changing denonimation on the right. New segmented security foil on the middle.
Abraham Valdelomar Pinto	Huacachina lagoon	50 Nuevos Soles	Oberthur Fiduciaire	21 December 2006	Slightly improved color changing denonimation on the right. New segmented security foil on the middle.
Jorge Bassadre	National Library	100 Nuevos Soles	Istituto Poligrafico e Zecca dello Stato	1 February 1991	Introduced on 22 July 1992. Color changing circles sprinkled all over the note to prevent counterfeiting.
Jorge Bassadre	National Library	100 Nuevos Soles	Istituto Poligrafico e Zecca dello Stato	25 June 1992	Introduced on 22 July 1992. Color changing circles sprinkled all over the note to prevent counterfeiting.
Jorge Bassadre	National Library	100 Nuevos Soles	Istituto Poligrafico e Zecca dello Stato	10 September 1992	Name under portrait edited to "Jorge Basadre Grohmann"
Jorge Bassadre	National Library	100 Nuevos Soles	Istituto Poligrafico e Zecca dello Stato	20 April 1995	Color changing denonimation on the right side. The color of the 100 on the left changed to pink.
Jorge Bassadre	National Library	100 Nuevos Soles	British American Bank Note	20 May 1999	Color changing denonimation on the right side. The color of the 100 on the left changed to pink.
Jorge Bassadre	National Library	100 Nuevos Soles	Giesecke+Devrient	27 September 2001	No changes.
Jorge Bassadre	National Library	100 Nuevos Soles	Giesecke+Devrient	28 October 2004	Slightly improved color changing denonimation on the right. New segmented security foil on the middle.
Jorge Bassadre	National Library	100 Nuevos Soles	Oberthur Fiduciaire	21 December 2006	Slightly improved color changing denonimation on the right. New segmented security foil on the middle.
Isabel Flores de Oliva, Saint Rose of Lima	Basilica and Convent of Santo Domingo	200 Nuevos Soles	Istituto Poligrafico e Zecca dello Stato	20 April 1995	Introduced on 29 August 1997. Color changing circles sprinkled all over the note to prevent counterfeiting, color changing denonimation on the right.

The printers of the banknotes were written on the reverse of the banknotes on the left down corner. These would be eventually removed from the next series.

From the late 2000s a new series of redesigned notes was introduced. The portraits of the banknotes were kept from the previous series but the reverses were changed by adding diverse buildings. These banknotes included even more improved security features compared to its predecessor. Throughout the circulation of the series, the name of the currency was also changed from Nuevos Sol to just Sol. The printers of the banknotes were no longer mentioned.

Second Series of the Nuevos Sol/Sol(2009–2018)
Images		Value	Printed by	Year	Changes
Obverse	Reverse	Value	Printed by	Year	Changes
José Abelardo Quiñones Gonzáles	Machu Picchu	10 Nuevos Soles	Oberthur Fiduciaire	13 August 2009	New, detailed security thread.
José Abelardo Quiñones Gonzáles	Machu Picchu	10 Nuevos Soles	Crane Currency	17 January 2013	New, detailed security thread.
José Abelardo Quiñones Gonzáles	Machu Picchu	10 Soles	Oberthur Fiduciaire	10 March 2016	Currency renamed from Nuevos Sol to Sol.
José Abelardo Quiñones Gonzáles	Machu Picchu	10 Soles	Oberthur Fiduciaire	5 July 2018	Currency renamed from Nuevos Sol to Sol.
San Marcos University, Raül Porras Barrenechea	Wall of the Citadel of Chan-Chan in Trujillo	20 Nuevos Soles	De La Rue	13 August 2009	New, detailed security thread.
San Marcos University, Raül Porras Barrenechea	Wall of the Citadel of Chan-Chan in Trujillo	20 Nuevos Soles	De La Rue	17 January 2013	New, detailed security thread.
San Marcos University, Raül Porras Barrenechea	Wall of the Citadel of Chan-Chan in Trujillo	20 Soles	(Not mentioned)	10 March 2016	Currency renamed from Nuevos Sol to Sol.
San Marcos University, Raül Porras Barrenechea	Wall of the Citadel of Chan-Chan in Trujillo	20 Soles	(Not mentioned)	5 July 2018	Currency renamed from Nuevos Sol to Sol.
Abraham Valdelomar Pinto	"El Castillo", Chavín de Huántar	50 Nuevos Soles	De La Rue	13 August 2009	New, detailed security thread.
Abraham Valdelomar Pinto	"El Castillo", Chavín de Huántar	50 Nuevos Soles	Korea Minting and Security Printing Corporation	22 March 2012	New, detailed security thread.
Abraham Valdelomar Pinto	"El Castillo", Chavín de Huántar	50 Soles	(Not mentioned)	5 July 2018	Currency renamed from Nuevos Sol to Sol.
Jorge Basadre Grohmann	Gran Pajatén	100 Nuevos Soles	De La Rue	13 August 2009	New, detailed security thread. New hologram thread and better color changing denonimation the centre.
Jorge Basadre Grohmann	Gran Pajatén	100 Nuevos Soles	Oberthur Fiduciaire	22 March 2012	New, detailed security thread. New hologram thread and better color changing denonimation the centre.
Jorge Basadre Grohmann	Gran Pajatén	100 Soles	Crane Currency	19 February 2015	Currency renamed from Nuevos Sol to Sol.
Isabel Flores de Oliva, Saint Rose of Lima	Sacred City of Caral-Supe	200 Nuevos Soles	Giesecke+Devrient	13 August 2009	New, detailed security thread and new hologram thread.
Isabel Flores de Oliva, Saint Rose of Lima	Sacred City of Caral-Supe	200 Nuevos Soles	Oberthur Fiduciaire	22 March 2012	Better color changing denonimation(SPARK).

From 2019, a total redesign of the banknotes with totally different portraits was issued from 2021 replacing older banknotes. Some of the notes were printed in 2019 but they were initially released after 2–3 years after printing from time to time starting from the smallest and ending in the highest denonimation.

Third Series of the Sol(2021-)
Images		Value	Printed by	Year(date)	Changes
Obverse	Reverse	Value	Printed by	Year(date)	Changes
María Isabel Granda y Larco	Vicuña, Ismene amancaes	10 Soles	Perum Peruri	21 March 2019	New hologram thread and color changing features on the right.
María Isabel Granda y Larco	Vicuña, Ismene amancaes	10 Soles	Perum Peruri	15 December 2022	New hologram thread and color changing features on the right.
José María Arguedas Altamirano	Andean Condor, Cantuta	20 Soles	Perum Peruri	21 March 2019	New hologram thread and color changing features on the right.
José María Arguedas Altamirano	Andean Condor, Cantuta	20 Soles	Perum Peruri	15 December 2022	New hologram thread and color changing features on the right.
María Rostworowski	Jaguar, Puya raimondii	50 Soles	Perum Peruri	21 March 2019	New hologram thread and color changing features on the right.
María Rostworowski	Jaguar, Puya raimondii	50 Soles	Perum Peruri	16 December 2021	New hologram thread and color changing features on the right.
Pedro Paulet	Marvelous spatuletail, Phragmipedium kovachii	100 Soles	De La Rue	21 March 2019	New hologram thread and color changing features on the right.
Pedro Paulet	Marvelous spatuletail, Phragmipedium kovachii	100 Soles	De La Rue	16 December 2021	New hologram thread and color changing features on the right.
Tilsa Tsuchiya	Andean cock-of-the-rock, Flor Bella Abanquina	200 Soles	Polish Security Printing Works	16 December 2021	New hologram thread and color changing features on the right.
Tilsa Tsuchiya	Andean cock-of-the-rock, Flor Bella Abanquina	200 Soles	Polish Security Printing Works	3 October 2024	New hologram thread and color changing features on the right.

Current PEN exchange rates
From Google Finance:	AUD CAD CHF CNY EUR GBP HKD JPY USD BRL EUR JPY
From Yahoo! Finance:	AUD CAD CHF CNY EUR GBP HKD JPY USD BRL EUR JPY
From XE.com:	AUD CAD CHF CNY EUR GBP HKD JPY USD BRL EUR JPY
From OANDA:	AUD CAD CHF CNY EUR GBP HKD JPY USD BRL EUR JPY

== See also ==
- Numismatic series Wealth and Pride of Peru
- Numismatic series Natural Resources of Peru
- Economy of Peru
- Peruvian inti
