= Central Reserve Bank of Peru =

Central Bank of Peru

Central Reserve Bank of Peru Banco Central de Reserva del Perú
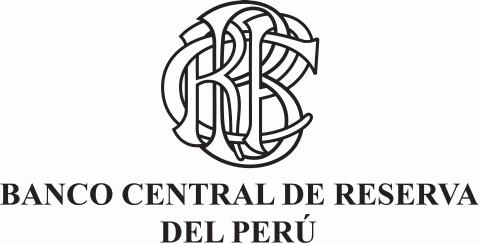

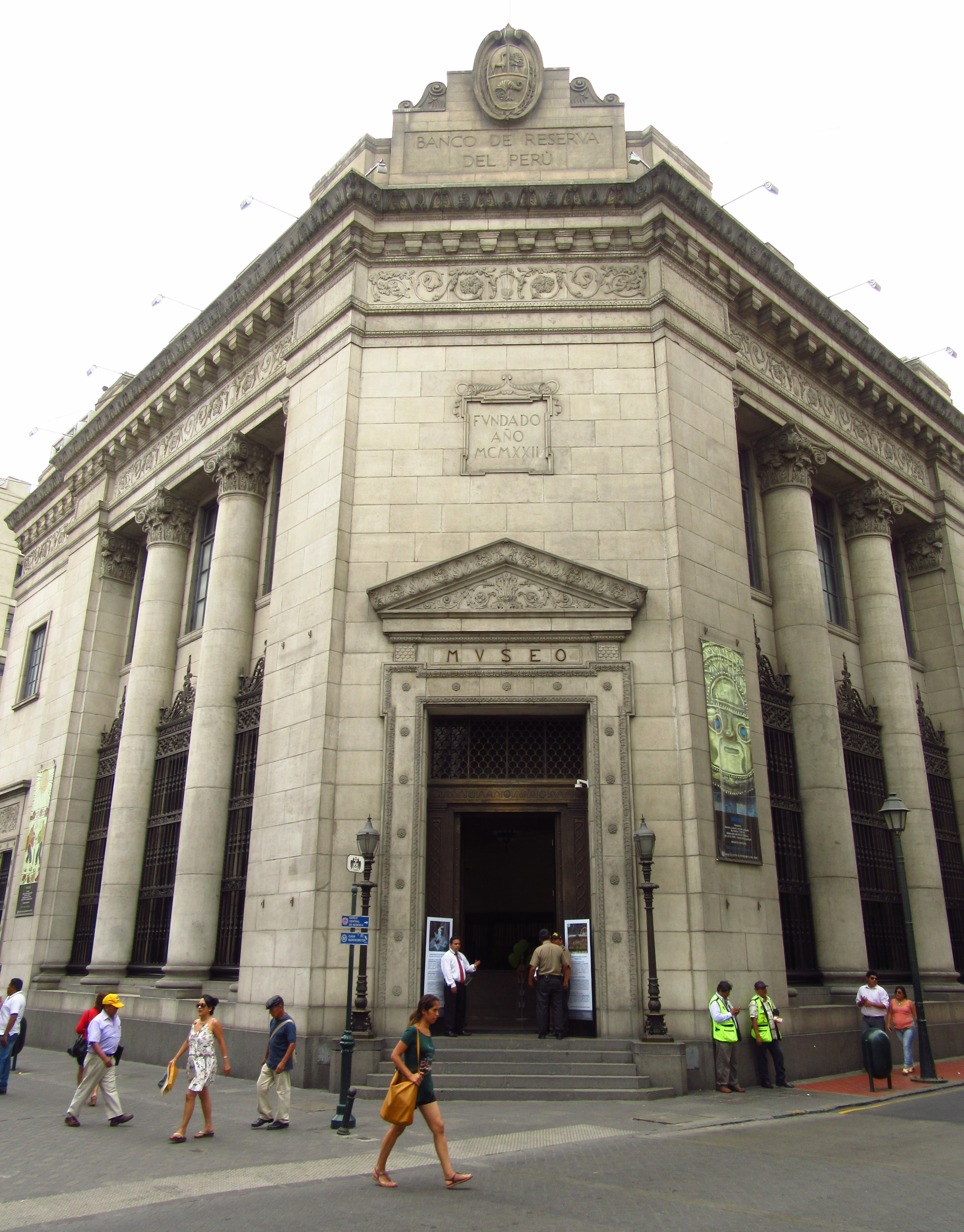
- Central Reserve Bank Building
- Headquarters: Jr. Santa Rosa de Lima, 441–445; 15001 Lima
- Coordinates: 12.048162°S 77.030141°W
- Established: March 9, 1922 (103 years ago)
- Ownership: 100% state ownership
- President: Julio Velarde Flores
- Central bank of: Peru
- Currency: Peruvian sol PEN (ISO 4217)
- Reserves: 59 400 million USD
- Bank rate: 7.17%
- Interest rate target: 2.75%
- Website: www.bcrp.gob.pe

The Central Reserve Bank of Peru (Spanish: Banco Central de Reserva del Perú; BCRP) is the Peruvian central bank. It mints and issues metal and paper money, the sol.

Its branch in Arequipa was established in 1871, and it served the city by issuing money as well as maintaining a good reputation for savings accounts in Southern Peru. It is the equivalent of the Federal Reserve of the United States or the European Central Bank in Europe.

The Constitution states that the purpose of the Central Reserve Bank is to preserve monetary stability. The Central Reserve Bank's target annual inflation is 2.0 percent, with a tolerance of one percentage point upward and downward; its policies are aimed at achieving that goal.

The Constitution also assigns the following functions to the Central Reserve Bank: regulating currency and credit of the financial system, administering the international reserves in its care, issuing banknotes and coins, reporting regularly to the country on national finances, and managing the profitability of funds.

== Presidents ==
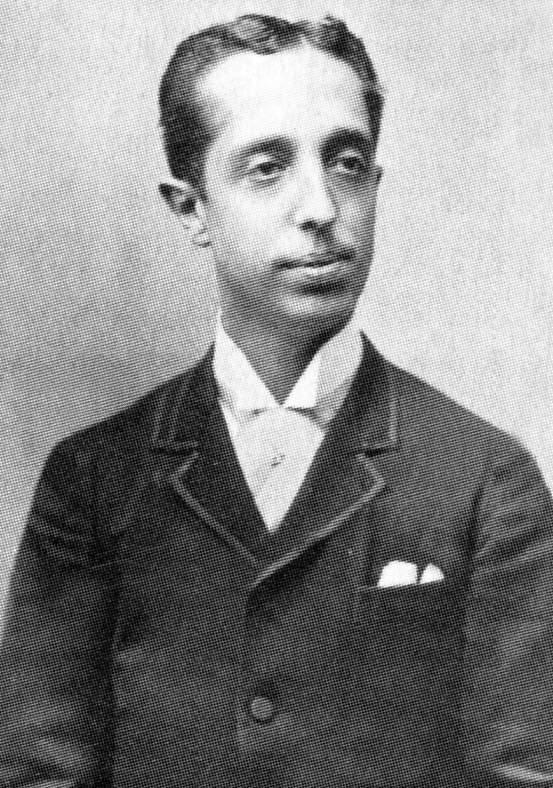
First president, Eulogio Romero Salcedo

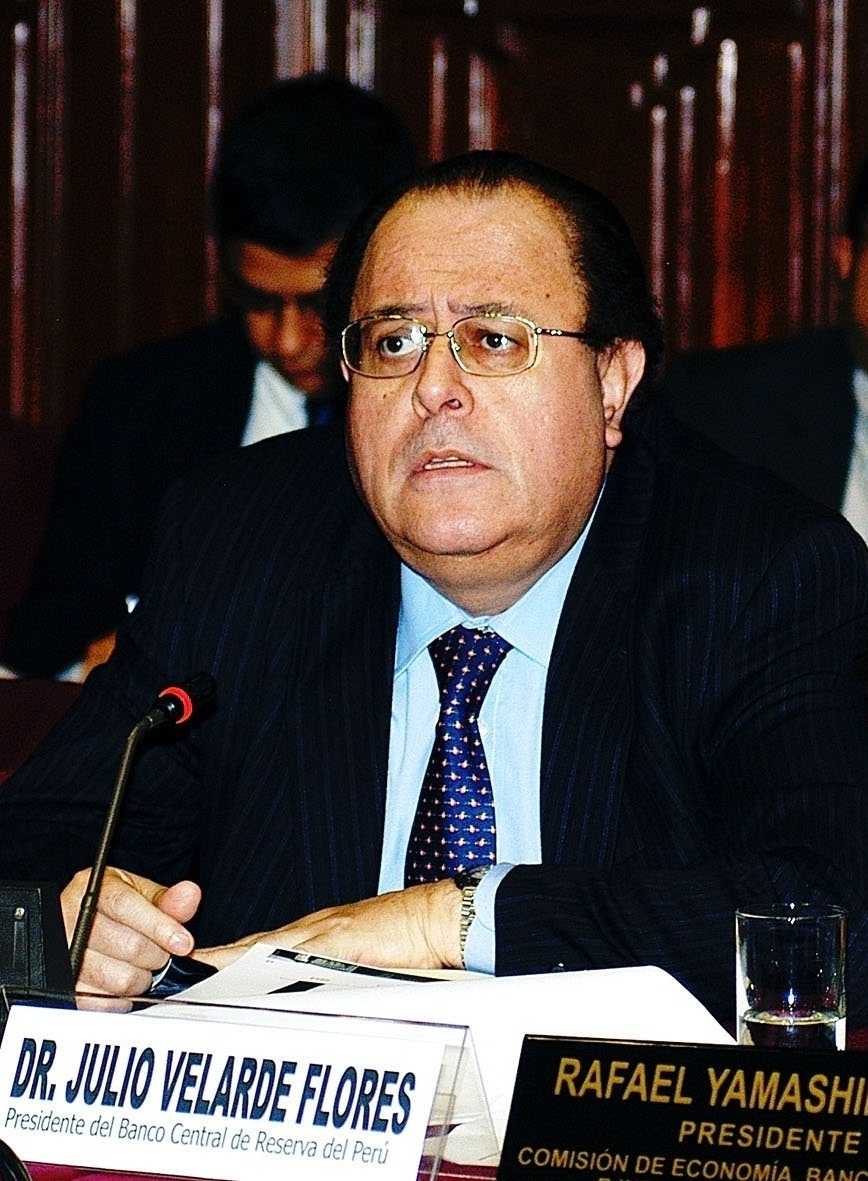
Current president, Julio Velarde Flores

- Eulogio Romero Salcedo, 1922-1925
- Agustín de la Torre González, 1926-1927
- Eulogio Romero Salcedo, 1928-1929
- Enrique Ferreyros, 1930-1931
- Manuel Augusto Olaechea, 1931-1934
- Manuel Prado Ugarteche, 1934-1939
- Fernando Gazzani, 1939-1945
- Francisco Tudela y Varela, 1945-1948
- Pedro Beltrán Espantoso, 1948-1950
- Clemente de Althaus Dartnell, 1950-1952
- Daniel Olaechea, 1952
- Andrés F. Dasso, 1952-1958
- Enrique Bellido, 1959-1964
- Alfredo C. Ferreyros, 1964-1966
- Fernando Schwalb, 1966-1968
- José Morales Urresti, 1968
- Carlos Vidal, 1968
- Alfredo Rodríguez Martínez, 1968-1969
- Emilio G. Barreto, 1969-1975
- Carlos Santisteban de Noriega, 1975-1977
- Germán de la Melena Guzmán, 1977-1978
- Manuel Moreyra Loredo, 1978-1980
- Richard Webb Duarte, 1980-1985
- Leonel Figueroa Ramírez, 1985-1987
- Pedro Coronado Labó, 1987-1990
- Jorge Chávez Álvarez, 1990-1992
- Germán Suárez Chávez, 1992-2001
- Richard Webb Duarte, 2001-2003
- Javier Silva Ruete, 2003-2004
- Óscar Dancourt Masías, 2004-2006
- Julio Velarde Flores, 2006-

== See also ==
- Economy of Peru
- List of Jesuit sites
- Peruvian inti
- Peruvian sol
- List of central banks
