= 1996 24 Hours of Daytona =

Previous: 1995	Next: 1997
Index: Races | Winners

Track map of Daytona International Speedway

The 1996 Rolex 24 at Daytona was a 24-hour endurance sports car race held on February 3–4, 1996 at the Daytona International Speedway road course. The race served as the opening round of the 1996 IMSA GT Championship.

Victory overall and in the WSC class went to the No. 4 Doyle Racing Riley & Scott Mk III driven by Wayne Taylor, Scott Sharp, and Jim Pace. Victory in the GTS-1 class went to the No. 01 Brix Racing Oldsmobile Aurora driven by Rob Morgan, Charles Morgan, Joe Pezza, Jon Gooding, and Irv Hoerr. The GTS-2 class was won by the No. 55 Stadler Motorsport Porsche 911 Carrera RSR driven by Enzo Calderari, Lilian Bryner, and Ulli Richter.

== Race results ==
Class winners in bold.

Pos	Class	No	Team	Drivers	Car	Tire	Laps
1	**WSC**	**4**	(United States) **Doyle Racing**	(South Africa) **Wayne Taylor** (United States) **Scott Sharp** (United States) **Jim Pace**	**Riley & Scott Mk III**	**P**	**697**
2	WSC	30	(Italy) Momo Corse	(Italy) Giampiero Moretti (France) Bob Wollek (Belgium) Didier Theys (Italy) Max Papis	Ferrari 333 SP	**Y**	697
3	WSC	63	(United States) Downing/Atlanta Racing	(United States) Tim McAdam (United States) Barry Waddell (United States) Butch Hamlet (United States) Jim Downing	Kudzu DLM	**G**	649
4	**GTS-2**	**55**	(Switzerland) **Stadler Motorsport**	(Switzerland) **Enzo Calderari** (Switzerland) **Lilian Bryner** (Germany) **Ulli Richter**	Porsche 911 Carrera RSR	**P**	**649**
5	WSC	43	(United States) Payne Racing	(Canada) Ross Bentley (France) Franck Fréon (United States) Lee Payne	Riley & Scott Mk III	**G**	645
6	GTS-2	78	(United States) Team A.R.E.	(United States) Cort Wagner (United States) Steve Dente (United States) Mike Doolin (United States) Richard Raimist	Porsche 964 Carrera RSR	**Y**	641
7	**GTS-1**	**5**	(United States) **Brix Racing**	(United States) **Rob Morgan** (United States) **Charles Morgan** (United States) **Joe Pezza** (United States) **Jon Gooding** (United States) **Irv Hoerr**	**Oldsmobile Aurora**	?	**641**
8	GTS-1	6	(Peru) Juan Dibos	(Peru) Eduardo Dibós Chappuis (United States) Boris Said (United States) Johnny O'Connell (Peru) Juan Dibos (Peru) Raúl Orlandini (Peru) Jorge Koechlin	Ford Mustang	**Y**	639
9	GTS-2	06	(United States) Prototype Technology Group, Inc.	(United States) John Paul Jr. (Costa Rica) Javier Quiros (United States) David Donohue (United States) Pete Halsmer	BMW M3 E36	**Y**	638
10	GTS-2	41	(Belgium) AD Sport	(Belgium) Kurt Dujardyn (Belgium) Franco la Rosa (Belgium) Michel Neugarten (Belgium) Kurt Thiers	Porsche 911 Carrera RSR	?	608
11	GTS-2	45	(Canada) Doug Trott	(Canada) Rick Bye (Canada) Doug Trott (United States) John Ruther (United States) Philip Kubik (United States) Grady Willingham	Porsche 993	?	604
12	GTS-2	99	(United States) Rohr Corp.	(United States) Andy Pilgrim (United States) Larry Schumacher (Germany) Harald Grohs (United States) Will Pace	Porsche 911 Carrera RSR	**P**	603
13	GTS-1	00	(United Kingdom) Agusta Racing	(Italy) Almo Coppelli (Italy) Rocky Agusta (United States) Brian Simo	Callaway Corvette	**D**	602
14	GTS-2	24	(United States) Alex Job Racing	(United States) Joe Cogbill (United States) Ron Finger (United States) Johnny Rutherford (United States) Monte Shelton	Porsche 911	**G**	599
15	GTS-2	86	(United States) G&W Motorsports	(United States) Steve Marshall (United Kingdom) Martyn Konig (United Kingdom) Peter Chambers (United States) Danny Marshall	Porsche 964 Carrera RSR	?	598
16	GTS-2	73	(United States) Jack Lewis Enterprises Ltd.	(United States) Jack Lewis (Puerto Rico) Edison Lluch (United States) Kevin Buckler (United States) Vic Rice	Porsche 993 Carrera RSR	?	591
17 DNF	GTS-2	03	(United States) Alan Friedman	(United States) Dirk Layer (United States) Larry Galbo (United States) Jim McCarthy (United States) Kelly Collins	Porsche 911 Carrera RSR	?	577
18	GTS-1	35	(United States) Bill McDill	(United States) Richard McDill (United States) Tom Juckette (United States) Bill McDill	Chevrolet Camaro	?	562
19	GTS-2	54	(Belgium) Peka Racing	(Belgium) Jean-François Hemroulle (Belgium) Stéphane Cohen (Belgium) Paul Kumpen (Belgium) Albert Vanierschot	Porsche 993	?	560
20	WSC	20	(United States) Dyson Racing	(United States) Butch Leitzinger (United Kingdom) Andy Wallace (United States) Rob Dyson (United Kingdom) James Weaver	Riley & Scott Mk III	**G**	555
21	GTS-2	75	(United States) Cameron Worth	(United States) Cameron Worth (Italy) Roberto Tonetti (United States) Rodger Bogusz (Germany) Hartmut Haussecker	Mazda RX-7	?	554
22	GTS-2	42	(United States) Jarett Freeman	(United States) Jarett Freeman (United States) Simon Gregg (United States) Max Schmidt	Porsche 993	**P**	546
23	GTS-2	26	(United States) Alex Job Racing	(United States) Charles Slater (United States) Richard Spenard (United States) Tom Hessert Jr.	Porsche 911	?	539
24	WSC	51	(United States) Fantasy Junction	(United States) Bruce Trenery (United Kingdom) Grahame Bryant (United Kingdom) Nigel Smith (United Kingdom) Jeffrey Pattinson	Cannibal	?	531
25	GTS-2	68	(United States) Tim Vargo	(United States) Peter Uria (United States) Brady Refenning (United States) John Maffucci (United States) Jack Refenning (United States) Tim Vargo	Porsche 911 Carrera	?	526
26	GTS-1	47	(France) Larbre Compétition	(Germany) Jürgen Barth (Spain) Jesús Pareja (France) Jean-Luc Chéreau (Brazil) Régis Schuch (France) Jack Leconte	Porsche 911 GT2	**M**	518
27	GTS-1	92	(United States) Hoyt Overbagh	(Italy) Mauro Casadei (Canada) Keith Minkhorst (Italy) Andrea Garbagnati (Italy) Francesco Ciani (Italy) Stefano Bucci	Chevrolet Camaro	?	477
28	GTS-2	65	(United States) GT Racing Team	(United States) Sam Brown (United States) Kurt Thiel (Italy) Vincenzo Polli (Italy) Renato Mastropietro	Porsche 911 Carrera	?	477
29	GTS-1	98	(United States) Canaska/Southwind	(United States) Price Cobb (United States) Tommy Archer (United States) Shawn Hendricks (United States) Mark Dismore (Canada) Victor Sifton	Dodge Viper GTS-R	**M**	472
30 DNF	WSC	8	(United States) Support Net Racing	(United States) Henry Camferdam (United States) Roger Mandeville (United States) Bill Auberlen (United States) Tony Kester	Hawk C-8	?	466
31	GTS-1	21	(United States) Kent Racing	(Italy) Mauro Barella (Germany) Willie Beck (United Kingdom) Alistair Davidson (United Kingdom) Huw Bolle-Jones (United States) Kent Painter	Chevrolet Monte Carlo	?	451
32 DNF	GTS-1	79	(New Zealand) Parr Motorsport/New Hardware	(New Zealand) Bill Farmer (United Kingdom) Robert Nearn (New Zealand) Greg Murphy (Monaco) Stéphane Ortelli (United States) Alex Tradd	Porsche 911 GT2	**P**	437
33 DNF	GTS-2	61	(United States) Mark Alan	(United States) Mark Mehalic (United States) Chris Cervelli (United States) Phillip Collin (United States) Gragg Tracy (United States) Spencer Sharpe	Porsche 911 Carrera	?	428
34	GTS-2	58	(United States) Pro Technik Racing	(United States) Sam Shalala (United States) Matt Turner (United States) Robby McGehee (United States) Mark Hillestad (United States) Jim Matthews	Porsche 993	**G**	420
35	GTS-1	10	(United States) Puleo Racing	(United States) Anthony Puleo (Germany) Ernst Gschwender (United States) Don Kitch Jr. (United States) Mark Kennedy (United States) Craig Conway	Chevrolet Camaro	?	391
36 DNF	GTS-1	15	Team Argentina	(Argentina) Facundo Gilbicella (Argentina) Luis Delconte (Argentina) Edgardo Raul Petrich (Argentina) Eduardo Lavari	Oldsmobile Cutlass Supreme	?	377
37	GTS-2	25	(United States) Alex Job Racing	(United States) Anthony Lazzaro (United States) Gerry Jackson (United States) Peter Faucetta (Italy) Angelo Cilli	Porsche 911	?	359
38	GTS-2	57	(United States) Kryderacing	(United States) Reed Kryder (France) Christian Heinkélé (France) Guy Kuster (Austria) Manfred Jurasz (United States) Frank Del Veccio	Nissan 240SX	?	358
39 DNF	GTS-2	52	(United States) Andy Strasser	(United States) Andy Strasser (United States) Kevin Wheeler (United States) Dave Russell (United States) Rick Peplin (United States) Alan Ludwig	Porsche 911 Carrera RSR	?	341
40 DNF	GTS-1	64	(United States) Mel A. Butt	(United States) Mel Butt (United States) Jim Higgs (United States) Dave McTureous (United States) Ronald Zitza	Chevrolet Camaro	?	321
41 DNF	GTS-1	91	(United States) Rock Valley Oil & Chemical Co.	(United States) Stu Hayner (United States) John Heinricy (United States) Roger Schramm (United States) Ron Nelson	Chevrolet Camaro	?	306
42 DNF	GTS-2	88	(United States) Douglas Campbell	(United States) Douglas Campbell (United States) Carlos Fronti (United States) Ralph Thomas (United States) Amos Johnson	Mazda RX-7	?	300
43 DNF	GTS-1	01	(United States) Rohr Corp.	(United States) Hurley Haywood (Canada) Scott Goodyear (United States) John O'Steen (United States) David Murry	Porsche 911 GT2	?	284
44 DNF	GTS-1	09	(Austria) Konrad Motorsport	(Germany) Bernd Netzeband (Brazil) Andre Lara-Resende (Germany) André Ahrlé (Czech Republic) Karel Dolejší	Porsche 911 GT2	?	281
45 DNF	GTS-1	49	(United States) Don Shaver	(United States) Don Shaver (United States) Stanton Barrett (United States) Jack Willes	Chevrolet Camaro	?	272
46 DNF	GTS-1	89	(United Kingdom) Lister Racing	(United Kingdom) Geoff Lees (United Kingdom) Kenny Acheson (United Kingdom) Tiff Needell	Lister Storm GTS	**M**	254
47 DNF	GTS-2	70	(Germany) Heico Motorsport	(Germany) Dirk Ebeling (Germany) Karl-Heinz Wlazik (Germany) Markus Oestreich (Germany) Ulli Richter	Porsche 993	?	231
48 DNF	GTS-2	46	(United States) Rob Collings	(United States) James Nelson (United States) Mark Greenberg (United States) Nort Northam (United States) John Drew (United States) Rob Collings	Porsche 911 Carrera RSR	?	231
49 DNF	WSC	36	(United States) Wheel Works Racing	(Belgium) Eric van de Poele (United States) Rick Sutherland (Belgium) Jean-Paul Libert (United States) Steve Fossett	Courage C41	?	209
50 DNF	GTS-1	1	(United States) Brix Racing	(United States) Irv Hoerr (United States) Brian Cunningham (United States) Mike Borkowski (United States) Darin Brassfield	Oldsmobile Aurora	**G**	207
51 DNF	GTS-1	90	(United States) Riggins Competition	(United States) Andy Petery (United States) Les Delano (United States) Tommy Riggins (United States) Craig Carter	Oldsmobile Cutlass Supreme	?	204
52 DNF	GTS-1	84	(United States) Team Viper	(Belgium) José Close (France) Bertrand Balas (France) Thierry Lecerf (Italy) Marco Spinelli (United States) Bob Hebert	Dodge Viper RT/10	**M**	203
53 DNF	GTS-2	07	(United States) Prototype Technology Group, Inc.	(Austria) Dieter Quester (Germany) Manfred Wollgarten (United States) Pete Halsmer	BMW M3 E36	?	198
54 DNF	GTS-1	74	(United States) Champion Porsche	(Germany) Hans-Joachim Stuck (Belgium) Thierry Boutsen (Canada) Bill Adam	Porsche 911 GT2	?	181
55 DNF	WSC	2	(United States) Screaming Eagles Racing	(United States) Johnny O'Connell (United States) Craig T. Nelson (United States) Dan Clark (United States) Case Montgomery	Riley & Scott Mk III	?	180
56 DNF	GTS-2	66	(United States) GT Racing Team	(Germany) Jürgen von Gartzen (Switzerland) Bruno Michelotti (Italy) Gualtiero Garibaldi (Italy) Luigino Pagotto	Porsche 993 Carrera RSR	?	174
57 DNF	WSC	7	(United States) Bobby Brown Motorsports	(United States) Elliott Forbes-Robinson (United States) John Schneider (United States) Don Bell (United States) Lon Bender	Spice HC94	?	159
58 DNF	GTS-1	97	(United States) Canaska/Southwind	(United States) George Robinson (Belgium) Éric Bachelart (Canada) Trevor Seibert (Canada) Victor Sifton	Dodge Viper GTS-R	**M**	157
59 DNF	GTS-1	05	Monaco Racing	(France) Olivier Grouillard (United States) Derek Hill (Monaco) Gildo Pallanca Pastor	Bugatti EB 110	**M**	154
60 DNF	GTS-2	67	(United States) Hendricks Porsche	(United States) Jeff Purner (United States) Dave White (United States) Karl Singer (United States) Charles Coker	Porsche 964 Carrera RSR	?	123
61 DNF	WSC	33	(United States) Fab Factory Motorsports	(United States) John Mirro (United States) Rick Fairbanks	Kudzu DG-2	?	109
62 DNF	WSC	3	(United States) Scandia Engineering	(Italy) Mauro Baldi (Italy) Michele Alboreto (Spain) Fermín Vélez	Ferrari 333 SP	?	106
63 DNF	GTS-1	02	(United States) Rohr Corp.	(Germany) Jochen Rohr (Germany) Herbert Schuerg (Germany) Axel Rohr (Sweden) Carl Rosenblad	Porsche 911 Turbo	?	105
64 DNF	GTS-1	08	(Austria) Konrad Motorsport	(Germany) Wido Rössler (Brazil) Antônio Hermann (Austria) Franz Konrad	Porsche 911 GT2	?	105
65 DNF	GTS-1	77	(United States) Tim Banks	(United States) Tim Banks (United States) Mark Montgomery (United States) Bob Hundredmark (United States) Steve Goldin (France) Pascal Dro	Oldsmobile Cutlass Supreme	?	96
66 DNF	GTS-1	56	(United States) Martin Snow	(United States) Martin Snow (United States) Dennis Aase (Costa Rica) Jorge Trejos (United States) P. J. Jones	Porsche 911 GT2	**P**	91
67 DNF	WSC	38	(United States) Pegasus Racing	(United States) Jon Field (Chile) Juan Carlos Carbonell (United States) Jim Briody	Pegasus NPTI	?	86
68 DNF	GTS-2	27	(United States) Tim Vargo	(United States) Jack Refenning (United States) Tim Vargo	Porsche 993 Carrera RSR	?	75
69 DNF	GTS-1	72	(United States) Champion Porsche	(United Kingdom) Derek Bell (United States) John Fergus (United States) Dorsey Schroeder	Porsche 964 Turbo	?	71
70 DNF	GTS-1	40	(Germany) Freisinger Motorsport	(Germany) Wolfgang Kaufmann (Japan) Yukihiro Hane (Germany) Edgar Dören (Germany) Klaus Scheer	Porsche 993 Carrera RSR	?	48
71 DNF	WSC	22	(Italy) Target 24	(Italy) Guido Daccò (Italy) Alex Caffi (Italy) Fabio Montani (Italy) Gabrio Rosa	Chevron B73	?	48
72 DNF	WSC	16	(United States) Dyson Racing	(United Kingdom) Andy Wallace (United States) Rob Dyson	Riley & Scott Mk III	**G**	43
73 DNF	GTS-1	62	(United States) Tom Curren	(United States) Billy Bies (United States) Dave Perelle (United States) Tom Curren (United States) Jimmy Hildock	Oldsmobile Cutlass	?	39
74 DNF	GTS-2	93	Ecuador Mobil 1 Racing	(Ecuador) Henry Taleb (Ecuador) Jean-Pierre Michelet (Ecuador) Wilson Amador (New Zealand) Rob Wilson (United States) Daniel Urrutia	Nissan 240SX	?	28
75 DNF	GTS-1	87	(United States) John Annis	(United States) John Annis (United States) David Donavon (United States) Jerry Gillis (United States) David LaCroix (United States) Gary Tiller (United States) Dana Webster	Chevrolet Camaro	?	8
76 DNF	WSC	9	(United States) Auto Toy Store, Inc.	(United Kingdom) Justin Bell (Sweden) Stanley Dickens (United States) John Shapiro (United States) Morris Shirazi (Germany) Gustl Sprent	Spice SE90	?	7
DNS	WSC	31	(Italy) Momo Corse	(United States) Bill Auberlen (United States) Tim Hubman (United States) John Morton (Italy) Max Papis (Italy) Giampiero Moretti	Ferrari 333 SP	**Y**	-
DNS	WSC	37	(United States) Pegasus Racing	(Chile) Giuseppe Bacigalupe (Chile) Juan Gac (Chile) Maurício Perrot (United States) Tim Richardson	Pegasus NPTI	**G**	-
DNS	GTS-1	44	(United States) Jacobs Motorsports	(United States) Michael Jacobs (United States) Brent Cross (United States) Michael Duffy (United States) Pat Sessions	Pontiac Firebird	?	-
DNS	WSC	94	(United States) Butch Brickell	(United States) Jim Guthrie	Banshee LNI-1	?	-
