= Raúl Orlandini =

Peruvian race car driver

Raúl Orlandini Dibós
- Born: May 26, 1952 Lima, Peru
- Died: November 15, 2006 (aged 54) Lima, Peru
- Relatives: Chachi Dibós (uncle)
- Years active: 1972–2006
- Wins: 5

Championship titles
- 2005 (Note: Also previously 1992, 1993, 1994, and 2003): Caminos del Inca Rally

Raúl Orlandini Dibós (1952–2006) was a Peruvian race car driver. He won the National Road Grand Prix "Caminos del Inca" five times (1992, 1993, 1994, 2003 and 2005), first with a Nissan Silvia and then a Mitsubishi Lancer Evo.

== Biography ==
Orlandini, also known as "El Colorado", was born in Lima on May 26, 1952, the son of Oscar Orlandini Toscani and Ivonne Dibós Chappuis. Through his mother, he was the nephew of Eduardo Dibós Dammert and Eduardo "Chachi" Dibós. He studied at the Colegio Maristas of San Isidro, later studying at the University of the Pacific but being removed six months later due to poor assistance. He then studied at the University of Lima, where he concluded his business administration studies. He married Kary Griswold in 1981, with whom he had three children: Kary, Raúl and Rafael.

From the age of five, Orlandini would go with his mother to watch his uncle Chachi's car races, later serving as his auxiliary. In 1972, alongside Jose Del Solar, he had his first experience in the Lima-Arequipa-Lima race in a Fiat 125, which was wrecked. He was sidelined for quite some time until 1975, when he returned to racing in the Peruvian Army Prize (Huancayo-Ayacucho-Pisco), finishing first with Eduardo Malachowski.

In 1976, Orlandini bought a Hillman and raced the Caminos del Inca Rally with Gianni Galleti (a school friend), finishing in the First Stage at Puente Verruga. He would later win the race five different times (1992, 1993, 1994, 2003, and 2005). After living in Ecuador for some years due to his family's business, he returned to Peru in 1981.

In May 2006, Orlandini participated in the Gran Premio Presidente de la República, finishing second in the Open Class category. He died on November 15, 2006, after a long battle with cancer; his remains were cremated the following day, and his ashes were given to his family.

== See also ==
- Jorge Koechlin
- Thomas Hearne (racing driver)
