= Canseco =

Canseco may refer to:

- Canseco (surname)
- The Cansecos, Canadian electronic band

== See also ==
- Conseco, Inc., an American insurance company now known as CNO Financial Group
- Diez Canseco, Peruvian surname
- San Martín de los Cansecos
