= Arturo Cavero =

Arturo Cavero may refer to:

- Arturo "Zambo" Cavero, Afro-Peruvian singer
- Arturo Cavero Calisto, Peruvian politician
