= Thomas Hearne (racing driver) =

Argentine racing driver

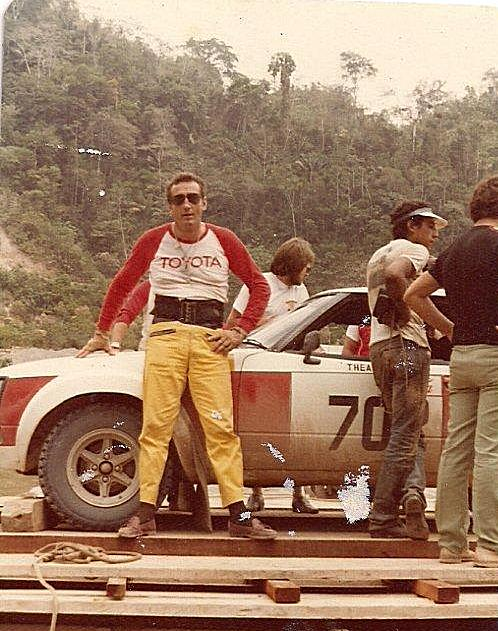
- Hearne in 1983
- Born: January 6, 1940 (age 86) Buenos Aires, Argentina
- Retired: 1987
- Years active: 1966–1987

Thomas Edward Hearne Massey (born January 6, 1940) is an Argentine former racing driver based in Peru. He is a two-time winner of the Peruvian Automobile Club's titular rally and a five-time winner of the Premio Presidente de la República (1978, 1979, 1981, 1984 and 1986).

== Early life ==
Hearne was born in Buenos Aires in 1940. His grandfather arrived to Argentina in 1850, purchasing farmland in Chivilcoy and later moving to Colón, where the family set up the Los Barriles ranch. Hearne studied at the city's Colegio Cardenal Newman, permanently moving to Lima at age 26 due to a General Motors internship.

== Career ==
In Lima, he participated in the 1966 edition of the Las 6 horas peruanas, an annual race held that year at the Campo de Marte park, located in Jesús María. He then became an active participant in the country's major races, most of them organised by the Peruvian Automobile Club, until his retirement at age 47. He was a participant of the Caminos del Inca Rally and of the 1988 Premio Bolivariano 88 of Venezuela's Touring and Automobile Club.

He also served, alongside Pablo Araneta Ramos and Gustavo Reategui Ostolaza, as an executive director of Toyota Hearne S.A., an important Toyota subsidiary in the country, then located in Lima's San Borja District. The dealership was sold in the 2000s alongside two others, and its terrain was eventually replaced by the Torre Tale Primavera skyscraper.

== See also ==
- Jorge Koechlin
- Raúl Orlandini
