= USS Shoveler =

Minesweeper of the United States Navy

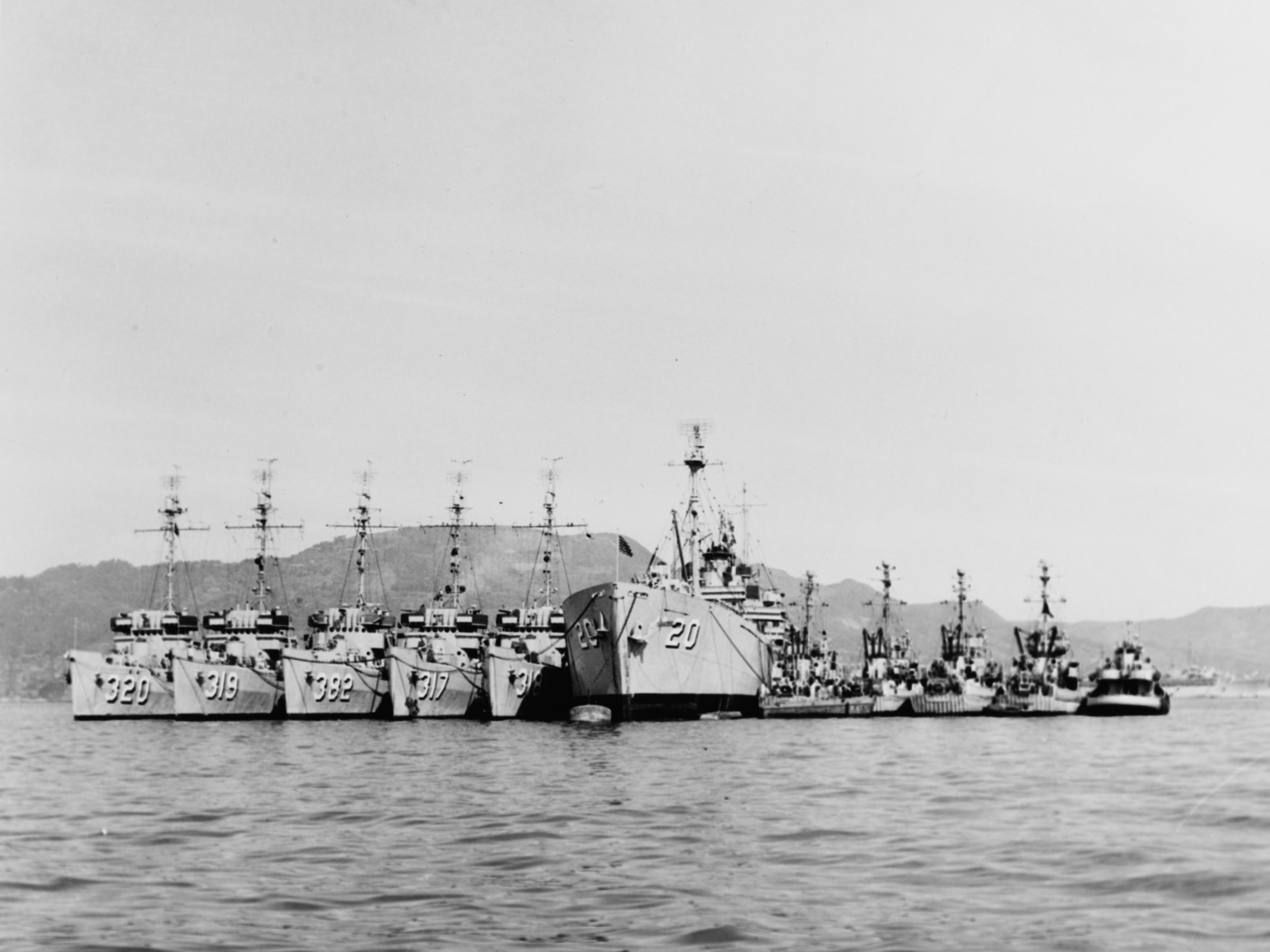
- USS Shoveler (third ship from left) at Sasebo, Japan, 1952

History

United States
- Name: USS Shoveler
- Namesake: Shoveler duck
- Builder: Gulf Shipbuilding Corp., Chickasaw, Alabama
- Laid down: 1 April 1944
- Launched: 10 December 1944
- Sponsored by: Mrs. William G. Burkhart
- Commissioned: 22 May 1945
- Decommissioned: 5 November 1946
- Recommissioned: 24 July 1951
- Reclassified: MSF-382, 7 February 1955
- Decommissioned: 28 September 1956 at San Diego, California
- Stricken: 17 May 1974
- Honors and awards: one battle star for World War II service and one for service in the Korean War
- Fate: Transferred to Peru, 1 November 1960

History

Peru
- Name: BAP Diez Canseco
- Namesake: Diez Canseco
- Acquired: 1 November 1960
- Fate: Stricken 1981

General characteristics
- Class & type: Auk-class minesweeper
- Displacement: 890 tons
- Length: 221 ft 1 in (67.39 m)
- Beam: 32 ft 2 in (9.80 m)
- Draft: 10 ft 9 in (3.28 m)
- Propulsion: two 3,532shp General Motors 12-278A diesel electric drive engines, Westinghouse single reduction gear, two shafts.
- Speed: 18.1 knots
- Complement: 117 officers and enlisted
- Armament: one 3 in (76 mm) dual purpose gun mount; two single 40 mm gun mounts; six single 20 mm gun mounts; one depth charge thrower (Hedgehogs), four depth charge projectiles (k-guns), two depth charge tracks

USS Shoveler (AM-382) was an Auk-class minesweeper acquired by the U.S. Navy for the dangerous task of removing mines from minefields laid in the water to prevent ships from passing.

== Construction history ==
Shoveler was laid down on 1 April 1944 by Gulf Shipbuilding Corp., Chickasaw, Alabama; launched on 10 December 1944; sponsored by Mrs. William G. Burkhart; and commissioned on 22 May 1945.

== World War II service ==
Shoveler was fitted out at New Orleans, Louisiana, and then reported to the Mine Warfare Base, Little Creek, Virginia, on 15 June for shakedown training. On 5 August, the minesweeper cleared that port en route to the west coast for assignment to Mine Force, Pacific Fleet. The ship arrived at San Pedro, California, on 23 August and conducted further trials. On 30 August, Shoveler stood out of San Pedro, California, underway for Eniwetok, Marshall Islands, via Pearl Harbor.

Shoveler arrived at Eniwetok on 18 September and was routed to Okinawa. Upon her arrival there, on 26 September, she was ordered to sail at once for Bungo Suido, Japan. She was back at Okinawa on 1 October to join the main task force which sailed for Sasebo on 18 October. Shoveler swept the Klondike mine field there during the period 26 October-2 November. The ship returned to Okinawa on 6 December 1945 and operated from there until returning to Sasebo on 20 January 1946. Shoveler swept mines from the areas around Kikai Shima, Miyako Jima, Amami Ōshima, Nagasaki, and Kagoshima.

Shoveler sailed from Japan on 12 April en route to San Pedro, California, via Eniwetok and Pearl Harbor. She entered the Todd Shipyard there on 27 June and prepared for inactivation. The minesweeper was placed out of commission, in reserve, on 5 November 1946.

== Korean War service ==
Shoveler was recommissioned on 24 July 1951 and assigned to Mine Squadron 5. After refresher training and fleet exercises off Santa Rosa, California, she entered the yard of the Harbor Boat Co., Long Beach, California, for alterations and repairs on 5 November 1951. When the work was completed on 7 January 1952, the ship moved down the coast of San Diego and acted as a mine warfare schoolship for three months.

On 20 March, Shoveler was ordered to the Far East. After port calls at Pearl Harbor and Guam, and minesweeping exercises in the Bonin Islands, she arrived at Sasebo, Japan, on 20 May. A week later, she got underway for the Korean War zone.

Shoveler arrived at Wonsan Harbor on 28 May to assist the United Nations forces. During the next four and one-half months, the minesweeper operated along the Korean coast from Musu Dan in the north to Kosong in the south. In addition to sweeping mines, she destroyed nine sampans with gunfire and bombarded the coast when afforded the opportunity. On 17 June, she was fired on by an enemy shore battery on Mayang Do but received no hits.

Shoveler returned to Sasebo in mid-October; and, on the 20th, she cleared that port for Long Beach, California. The minesweeper arrived there on 20 November 1952 and, for the next two years, operated along the coast of California as a unit of Mine Division 72.

Shoveler was again deployed to the Far East on 21 October 1954 and operated out of Sasebo, Japan. On 21 November 1954, she commenced a series of patrols along the east coast of Korea. She steamed from Sasebo to Keelung, Taiwan, on 1 February 1955 and five days later departed that port for the Tachen Islands to assist in the evacuation there. The minesweeper swept channels during the days and ran antitorpedo boat patrols during the nights until 14 February when she returned to Sasebo. Shoveler's hull classification was changed from AM-382 to MSF-382 on 7 February. She departed the Far East on 9 May and arrived at Long Beach, California, on 1 June 1955.

== Decommissioning and disposal ==
The minesweeper operated from that port for the next year. Shoveler moved to San Diego, California, on 29 June 1956 for inactivation and was placed out of commission, in reserve, on 28 September 1956.

== Peruvian service ==
Shoveler was loaned to Peru on 1 November 1960 under the Foreign Military Assistance Program and was renamed BAP Diez Canseco.

== Awards and honors ==
Shoveler received one battle star for World War II service and one for service in the Korean War.
