= Albizuri =

Albizuri is a Basque surname. Notable people with the surname include:

- Beñat Albizuri (born 1981), Spanish cyclist
- Luis Albizuri (1851–1933), Peruvian politician

== See also ==
- Claudio Albizuris (born 1981), Guatemalan footballer
