= List of mayors of Lima =

Mayor of Lima
- Coat of arms of Lima

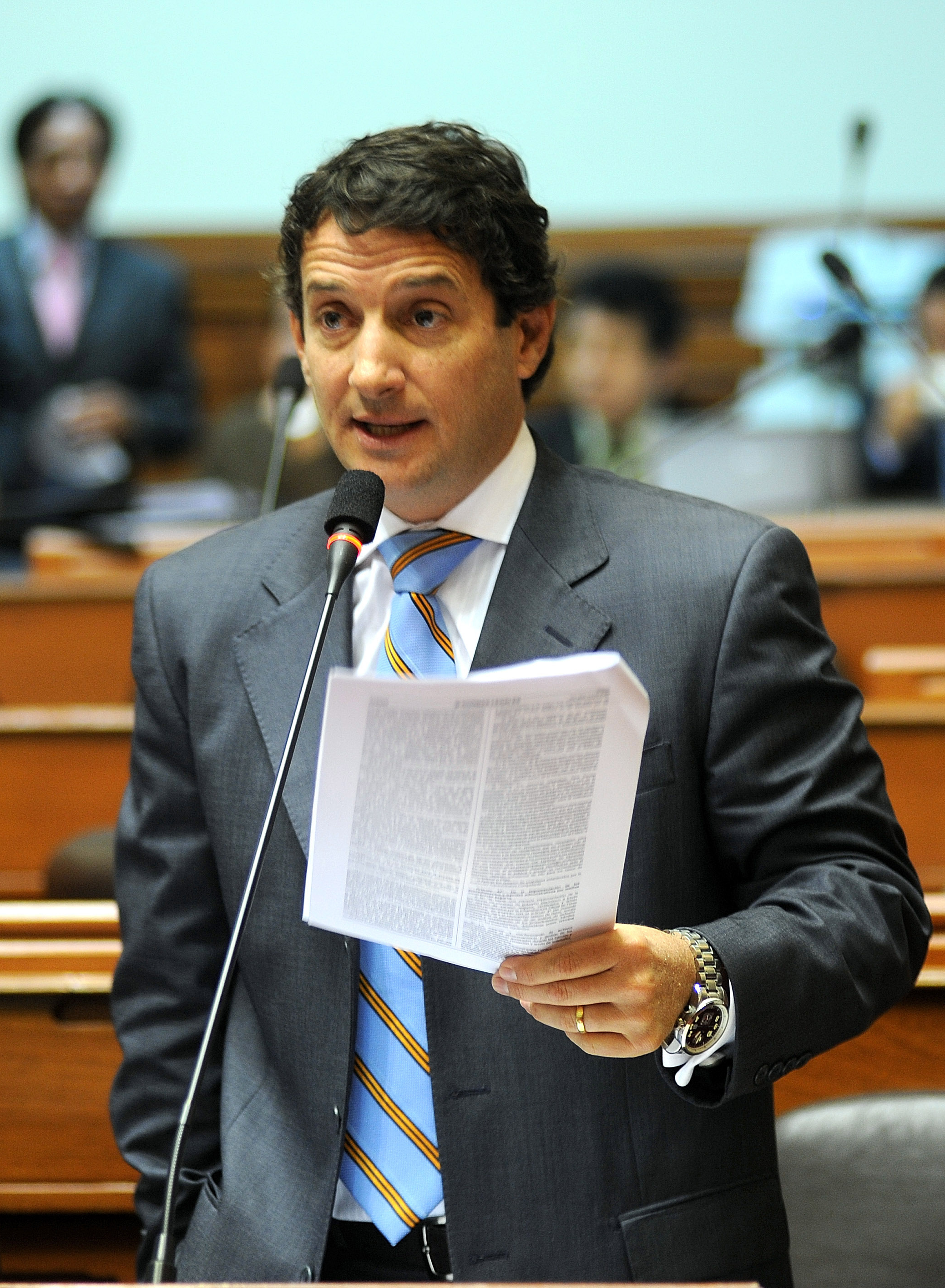
- Incumbent; Renzo Reggiardo since October 13, 2025
- Seat: Municipal Palace
- Inaugural holder: Nicolás de Ribera; Juan Tello de Guzmán
- Formation: January 22, 1535
- Website: Official site

The following is a list of mayors (alcaldes) of Lima since the city's foundation in 1535.

Under Spanish rule, the city's cabildo was headed by an Alcalde ordinario. (Note: Under this system, the mayorship was shared by an alcalde de primer voto (roughly "first mayor") and an alcalde de segundo (roughly "second mayor")) Currently, the city's local government is under the jurisdiction of the Metropolitan Municipality of Lima, which administers the province as a whole, equal in status to a regional government.

The aforementioned current system of government dates back to 1963, with the creation of the local government system under the first presidency of Fernando Belaúnde. From its creation until 1998, with an exemption between 1968 and 1980 due to military rule, the term of office was three years. Mayors have since been elected every four years.

== List of mayors ==
Name		Office started	Office ended	Party affiliation
First vote	Second vote	Office started	Office ended	Party affiliation
Nicolás de Ribera (El Viejo)	Juan Tello de Guzmán	January 22, 1535	December 1535	—
Francisco de Godoy	Juan Mogrovejo de Quiñones (Note: From June 1 until the end of the year, Hernán Gonzales replaced Mogrovejo due to his absence.)	January 1, 1536	December 1536	—
Sebastián de Torres	Francisco Dávalos	December 29, 1536	December 1537	—
Juan de Barbarán	Hernando de Montenegro (Note: Hernán Gonzales replaced the absent Montenegro until September 27.)	January 1, 1538	December 1538	—
Domingo de la Presa (Note: Replaced on June 6 by Francisco Núñez de Bonilla.)	Francisco Herrera	January 1, 1539	1539	—
Martín Pizarro	Juan Fernández	1540	1540	—
Juan de Barrios (absent)	Alonso Palomino (absent)	1541	1541	—
Alonso Martín de Don Benito	Ruy-Barba-Cabeza de Baca	1541	1541	—
Francisco de Godoy	Francisco Rodríguez	1542	1542	—
Juan de Barbarán	Pedro Navarrete	1543	1543	—
Francisco Ampuero	Alonso Palomino	1544	1544 (Note: Ampuero resigned on January 21, being replaced by Nicolás de Ribera (El Viejo). Palomino's absence then led to the appointment of Antonio de Ribera on September 27. The tenure of both ended with the cabildo's session on October 8.)	—
Antonio de Ribera	Pedro Martín de Sicilia	September 27, 1545	1545	—
Antonio de Ribera	Nicolás de Ribera (El Viejo)	January 1546	1546 (Note: Whether both served the entire year cannot be ascertained.)	—
Martín Pizarro	Juan Fernández	1547	1547	—
Andrés de Cianca	Gregorio de Silva	1548	1548 (Note: Silva is recorded as mayor starting on October 11, while Ciancas is recorded as having replaced Captain Lorenzo de Aldana as Justicia mayor of Lima on November 19.)	—
Pedro de Portocarrero (Note: Regidor Francisco de Ampuero was appointed as his replacement during his absence. Not having shown up by March 1st, new elections were held and Nicolás de Ribera was elected instead.)	Ruy-Barba-Cabeza de Baca	January 1, 1549	1549	—
Francisco de Talavera	Sebastián Gonzáles de Merlo	January 1, 1550	1550	—
Jerónimo de Silva	Alonso Martín de Don Benito	January 1, 1551	1551	—
Antonio de León	Martín Pizarro (Note: Pizarro received the same number of votes as Pedro de Zárate, with the Viceroy choosing the former.)	January 1, 1552	1552	—
Francisco Velásquez de Talavera	Pedro de Zárate (Note: Zárate received the same number of votes as Martín Pizarro, with the Viceroy choosing the former.)	January 1, 1553	1553	—
Nicolás de Ribera (El Viejo)	Diego Pizarro de Olmos	January 1, 1554	1554	—
Rodrigo Niño	Jerónimo de Silva	January 1, 1555	1555	—
Hernando de Montenegro	Ruy-Barba-Cabeza de Baca	January 1, 1556	1556	—
Muñoz Dávila	Jerónimo de Silva	January 1, 1557	1557	—
Vasco de Guevara (Note: Guevara's absence led to the Viceroy's appointment of Martín Pizarro until the former's incorporation on February 16.)	Rodrigo Niño (Note: Niño's absence led to his replacement by Francisco Velasquez de Talavera from July 8 to October 26, when he replaced Guevara.)	January 2, 1558	1558	—
Jerónimo de Silva	Diego Pizarro de Olmos	January 1, 1559	1559	—
Sebastián Sánchez de Merlo (Note: Replaced by Francisco de Ampuero during the cabildo's September 24 meeting due to both mayors' absence.)	Gómez Carabantes de Mazuelas	January 1, 1560	1560	—
Lorenzo Estupiñán de Figueroa (Note: His absence led to the conclusion of his term by Francisco de Ampuero from November 14 onwards.)	Álvaro de Torres	January 1, 1561	1561	—
Francisco Velásquez de Talavera	García de León	January 1, 1562	1562	—
Muñoz Dávila	Antonio de Ribera	January 1, 1563	1563	—
Gómez Carabantes de Mazuelas	Lorenzo Estupiñán de Figueroa	1564	1564	—
Ordoño de Valencia	Álvaro de Torres	January 1, 1565	1565	—
Francisco Velásquez de Talavera	Juan de Cadahalso Salazar (Note: Replaced by Francisco de Ampuero due to his absence on January 14.)	January 1, 1566	1566	—
Gómez Carabantes de Mazuelas	Bernardo Ruiz	January 1, 1567	1567	—
Álvaro de Torres	Martín Ruiz de Marchena (Note: Chosen by the Viceroy after receiving the same number of votes as Diego de Lopez.)	January 1, 1568	1568	—
Antonio de Rivera	Francisco de Zárate	1569	1569	—
Juan de Cadahalso Salazar	Juan de la Rinaga	1570	1570	—
Francisco de Ampuero	Juan Ruiz	January 1, 1571	1571	—
Álvaro de Torres	Diego Porras Sagredo (Note: Did not take office: replaced by Juan Ruiz for one month and by Lope de Pila for the remainder of his term.)	January 1, 1572	1572	—
Agustín Ramírez de Molina	Pedro de Vega	January 1, 1573	1573	—
Sancho de Ribera (Note: Replaced by Lope de Pila from June 25 to July 19 due to his poor health at the time.)	Francisco de Ampuero	January 1, 1574	1574	—
Antonio Navarro	Diego de Porras Sagredo	January 1, 1575	1575	—
Diego de Carvajal y Vargas	Juan de la Rinaga	January 1, 1576	1576	—
Juan Maldonado de Buendía	Agustín Ramírez de la Molina	January 1, 1577	1577	—
Juan de Caldahaso Salazar	Garci Pérez de Salinas	January 1, 1578	1578	—
Pedro de Zarate	Antonio de Meneses (Note: Appointment annulled by the Viceroy on January 1 and replaced on the same day by Melchor de Cadahalso Salazar.)	January 1, 1579	1579	—
Juan de Cadahalso Salazar	Diego Porras Sagredo	January 1, 1580	1580	—
Juan Maldonado de Buendía (Note: Replaced from November 10 onwards by Martín de Ampuero due to his absence.)	Francisco de Aliaga de los Ríos	January 1, 1581	1581	—
José de Ribera y Dávalos	Garci Pérez de Salinas	January 1, 1582	1582	—
Juan de Cadahalso Salazar	Martín Alonso de Ampuero	January 1, 1583 (Note: Elected on New Year's Eve.)	1583	—
Jerónimo de Guevara	Garci-Barba Cabeza de Baca	January 1, 1584	1584	—
Juan Fernández	Domingo de Garro	January 1, 1585	1585	—
Francisco de Quiñones (Note: The Corregidor was appointed president of the Ayuntamiento, during which period the post of mayor was suspended by Viceroy Fernando Torres de Portugal until the royal decree of February 23, 1589, which revoked this suspension, was executed.)		1586	October 21, 1589	—
Juan de Barrios	Pedro de Santillán	October 24, 1589	1590	—
Francisco de Mendoza Manrique	Melchor de Cadahalso Salazar (Note: Took office on January 6th, having been replaced by Diego de Agüero beforehand.)	January 1, 1591	1591	—
Jerónimo de Guevara (Note: From June 5 until the end of his term, Diego de Agüero replaced the absent Guevara, who was sent to Spain by the Ayuntamiento.)	Damián de Meneses	January 1, 1592	1592	—
Pedro de Zárate	Juan Fernández de Ulloa	January 1, 1593	1593	—
Juan Bayon de Campomanes (Note: Replaced by Diego de Agüero during his absence from January 1 to March 2.)	Domingo de Garro	1594	1594	—
Francisco de Cárdenas (Note: Replaced by Diego de Agüero during his absence from September 25 to October 23.)	Martín Alonso de Ampuero	January 1, 1595	1595	—
Juan de Cadahalso Salazar (Note: Appointed by the Viceroy after receiving the same number of votes as Juan Fernandez de Heredia.)	Domingo de Garro	January 1, 1596	December 1596	—
Fernando Niño de Guzmán	Antonio Dávalos	December 31, 1596	1597	—
Alonso de Vegas Carvajal	Lope de Mendoza	1598	1598	—
Domingo de Garro	José de Ribera y Dávalos (Note: Replaced by Diego de Agüero from August 20 onwards due to his absence in Chile.)	January 1, 1599	1599	—
Juan Dávalos de Ribera (Note: Member of the Order of Calatrava)	José de Agüero	1600	1600	—
Francisco de la Cueva	Fernando de Córdova y Figueroa	January 1, 1601	1601	—
Diego de Carvajal-Vargas y Marroquín	Domingo de Garro	January 1, 1602	1602	—
Francisco de Quiñones	Juan Dávalos de Ribera (Note: Replaced from January 7 onwards by Fernando Niño de Guzman.)	January 1, 1603	1603	—
Fernando de Córdova	Figueroa y Pedro de Zárate	January 1, 1604	1604	—
Domingo de Garro	Rodrigo de Guzmán y Tobar	January 1, 1605	1605	—
Diego de Portugal	Lope de Mendoza	January 1, 1606	1606	—
José de Ribera y Dávalos	Luis Castilla Altamirano	January 1, 1607	1607	—
Juan de la Cueva Villavicencio	Antonio de Monroy	January 1, 1608	1608	—
Juan Dávalos de Ribera	Fernando de Córdova y Figueroa	January 1, 1609	1609	—
José de Ribera y Dávalos	Lope de Mendoza (Note: His death led to the appointment of Diego de Agüero as his replacement from November 15 onwards.)	January 1, 1610	December 1610	—
José de Ribera y Dávalos	Pedro Gutiérrez de Mendoza	1610 & 1611 (Note: Gutiérrez de Mendoza was appointed on January 1, 1611. Despite Ribera's reelection not being allowed, the works undertaken under his tenure—which included the completion of the city bridge—led to a request being made by the Cabildo to the Viceroy on December 3, 1610, who approved and verified it on the same day.)	1611	—
Luis de Larrinaga y Salazar	Bartolomé de Osmayo y Velasco	January 1, 1612	1612	—
Juan de Zárate	Francisco de Sosa y Martínez de Rengifo	January 1, 1613	1613	—
Alonso de Mendoza Hinojosa (Note: His death led to the appointment of Diego de Agüero as his replacement from June 27 onwards.)	Antonio Ulloa Contreras	January 1, 1614	1614	—
Fernando de Córdova y Figueroa	Juan Arévalo de Espinosa	January 1, 1615	1615	—
Enrique de Castillo Fajardo	Juan de la Cueva Villavicencio	January 1, 1616	1616	—
Juan Arévalo de Espinosa	Diego de Carvajal	January 1, 1617	1617	—
Juan de Zárate	Diego de Ayala y Contreras	January 1, 1618	1618	—
José de Ribera y Dávalos	Diego de Carvajal	January 1, 1619	1619	—
Pedro de Bedoya y Guevara	Luis Fernández de Córdova	January 1, 1620	1620	—
José de Ribera y Dávalos	Juan Arévalo de Espinosa (Note: Took office on January 3 due to being ill on the day of his appointment.)	January 1, 1621	1621	—
Leandro de Larrinaga Salazar	Jerónimo de Aliaga de los Ríos (Note: His absence led to his replacement by Gonzalo Prieto de Abreu from January 1 to 22.)	January 1, 1622	1622	—
Luis Fernández de Córdova	Antonio de Morga	January 1, 1623	1623	—
Juan de los Ríos y Berriz	Pedro Bedoya y Guevara	January 1, 1624	1624	—
Antonio de Ulloa y Contreras	Francisco Gutiérrez Flores	January 1, 1625	1625	—
Pedro de Aliaga Sotomayor	Juan de la Cueva Villavicencio (Note: His resignation led to his replacement by Captain Gabriel de Acuña Verdugo from February 4 onwards.)	January 1, 1626	1626	—
Luis de Mendoza y Rivera	Juan de la Cueva (El Mozo)	January 1, 1627	1627	—
Juan de Guzmán Luna	Juan de la Serna Montalvo	January 1, 1628	1628	—
José de Ribera y Dávalos	Pedro Aliaga de Sotomayor	January 1, 1629	1629	—
Juan de los Ríos y Berriz	Pedro de Vedota y Guevara	January 1, 1630	1631	—
Gabriel de Acuña Verdugo	Luis de Mendoza y Rivera	January 1, 1632; January 1, 1633	1632; 1633	—
Juan de Mendoza y Castilla	García de Ijar Mendoza	January 1, 1634	1634	—
Juan de Mendoza y Castilla	Fernando de Castilla Altamirano	January 1, 1634	1634	—
Pedro de Vega	Antonio Gedler Calatayud	January 1, 1635	1635	—
Pedro de Vega	Antonio de la Daga y Vargas	January 1, 1635	1635	—
Luis de Carvajal-Vargas Marroquí	Pedro de la Cueva	January 1, 1636	1636	—
Luis de Carvajal-Vargas Marroquí	Juan de Valencia	January 1, 1636	1636	—
Iñigo López de Zúñiga	Domingo de Olea	January 1, 1637	1638	—
Pedro José de Castro Isagasa	Diego Fajardo Campoverde	1639	1639	—
Alonso Paredes	Juan de los Ríos y Berriz	January 1, 1640	1640	—
Rodrigo de Vargas Carvajal	Felipe Espinosa y Mieses	January 1, 1641	1641	—
José Delgadillo de Sotomayor	Fernando de Castilla Altamirano	January 1, 1642	1642	—
Pedro Lescano de Centeno	Tomas de Avendaño	January 1, 1643	1643	—
Bartolomé de Hazaña	Álvaro de los Ríos Villafuerte	January 1, 1644	1644	—
Gabriel de Castilla y Lugo	Juan de Figueroa	January 2, 1645	1645	—
Nicolás Flores y Aguilar	Luis de Carbajal Marroquí	January 1, 1646	1646	—
Pedro Bedoya de Guevara (Note: Both were replaced by Julian de Lorca from March 7 to April 4 due to illness.)	Francisco Arce de Sevilla	January 1, 1647	1647	—
Ordoño de Zamudio y Medina	Álvaro de los Ríos y Berriz	January 1, 1648	1648	—
Luis Mendoza de Carvajal	José de Mendoza y Castilla	January 1, 1649	1649	—
Pedro de la Cueva	Gabriel de Castilla y Lugo (Note: Due to an illness, he was replaced by Fernando Arias de Ugarte from March 11 to August 23.)	January 1, 1650	1651	—
Francisco de la Cueva y Guzmán	José Delgadillo de Sotomayor	January 1, 1652	1653	—
Pedro José de Castro Isagasa	Bartolomé de la Hazaña	January 1, 1654	1654	—
Felipe de Espinosa y Mieses	Iñigo López de Zúñiga	January 1, 1655	1655	—
Juan Ochoa Salmerón	Luis de Sandoval y Guzmán	January 1, 1656	1656	—
Nicolás F. de Villavicencio	Diego Bermudes de la Torre	January 1, 1657	1657	—
Gabriel de Vega y Rinaga	Antonio Bravo Lagunas	January 1, 1658	1659	—
José Delgadillo de Sotomayor	Gabriel de Castilla y Lugo	January 1, 1660	1660	—
Alonso de la Cueva Mesía (Note: Both were replaced by Fernando Arias de Ugarte and Tomás de Avendaño until June 4 due to illness.)	Sebastián Navarrete	January 1, 1661	1661	—
Fernando de Castilla Altamirano	José de Vega y Rinaga	January 1, 1662	1662	—
José de Torres y Padilla (El Viejo)	Francisco Sarmiento de Pastrana	January 1, 1663	1663	—
Amador de Cabrera Ulloa (Note: Replaced by Juan Bravo de la Maza from October 29 to 31.)	Bartolomé de la Hazaña	January 1, 1664	1664	—
Juan de la Celda Verdugo	Tomas Barreto de Castro	January 1, 1665	1665	—
Gabriel de Castilla y Lugo (Note: Replaced by Alférez José Ventura Zúñiga y Abellaneda from March 17 to April 16 due to an illness.)	José de Méndez y Castilla	January 1, 1666	1666	—
Juan de la Presa y de la Cueva	José de Torres y Zúñiga	January 1, 1667	1667	—
Bartolomé de Hazaña	Iñigo de Torres y Zúñiga	January 1, 1668	1668	—
Diego de Carvajal y Vargas	Álvaro de los Ríos Villafuerte	January 1, 1669	January 9, 1670	—
Martín de Zavala y de la Maza	Francisco Mejía Ramón	January 9, 1670	1670	—
García de Ijar y Mendoza	Antonio de Campos Marín de Benavides	January 1, 1671	1671	—
Alonso Lazo de Vega	José de Vega y Rinaga	January 1, 1672	1672	—
Fernando de Córdova y Sande	Francisco de la Cueva y Guzmán	January 1, 1673 (Note: Guzmán was appointed the following day due to being absent the day prior.)	1673	—
Gil de Cabrera y Dávalos	Juan de Castilla y Alarcón	January 1, 1674	1674	—
García de Ijar y Mendoza	Pedro Lascano Zenteno de Baldes	January 1, 1675	1675	—
Luis Antonio Bejarano Fernández de Córdova	José de Castro Isasaga	January 1, 1676	1676	—
José de Agüero y Añasco	Nicolás Dávalos de Ribera y Ribera	January 1, 1677	1677	—
Gabriel de Castilla y Lugo	Francisco Delgadillo de Sotomayor (Note: An illness led to his replacement by Pedro Lascano Centeno de Baldes from May 24 to July 29.)	January 1, 1678	1678	—
Juan de la Presa y Cueva (Note: An illness led to his replacement by Pedro Lascano Centeno de Baldes from July 11 to October 6.)	Juan de Urdanegui y López de Inoso	January 1, 1679	1679	—
Juan Nicolás Roldán Dávila	Fernando Perales y Saavedra	January 1, 1680	1680	—
Ordoño de Zamudio y Medina	Melchor Malo de Molina y Aliaga	January 1, 1681	1681	—
Sancho de Castro	Melchor Malo de Molina y Aliaga	January 1, 1682	1682	—
Alonso Lazo de Vega	Diego Manrique de Lara (Note: An illness led to his replacement by Alférez Gaspar de Ahumada from May 11 to April 27.)	January 1, 1683	1683	—
Nicolás Dávalos de Ribera y Ribera	Juan de Celda Verdugo Barba	January 1, 1684	1684	—
Rodrigo Vilella y Esquivel	Fernando de Espinoza y Pastrana	January 1, 1685	1685	—
Iñigo de Torres y Zúñiga	Diego Manrique de Lara	January 1, 1686	1686	—
José de Agüero y Añasco	Pedro Zegarra de Guzmán	January 1, 1687 (Note: The events of October 20 led to the additional appointment of Diego Tebes Montalvo Manrique de Lara and Fernando de Espinoza y Pastrana to better service the city.)	1687	—
José de Agüero y Añasco	Juan de Celda Verdugo Barba	January 1, 1687	1687	—
Diego Hurtado de Mendoza	Rodrigo de Mendoza y Ladrón de Guevara	January 1, 1688	1688	—
Diego de Carbajal Marroquí (Note: Carbajal was appointed after receiving the same number of votes as Martín de Zamudio. A fatal illness led to his replacement by Pedro Lascano Centeno y Baldes from May 13 onwards.)	Pedro de Hazaña Solís y Palacio	January 1, 1689	1689	—
Pedro de Llano Zapata	Francisco Delgadillo de Sotomayor	January 1, 1690	1690	—
Gaspar de Perales y Saavedra	Antonio de Aguirre	January 1, 1691	1691	—
Juan de la Cueva y Mendoza	Pedro Baltasar Merino de Heredia	January 1, 1692	1692	—
Luis de Sotomayor y Pimentel (Note: Member of the Order of Santiago)	Martín Zamudio de las Infantas	January 1, 1693	1693	—
Gaspar de Perales y Saavedra	Antonio de Aguirre	January 1, 1694	1694	—
Luis Sandoval y Guzmán	Francisco de Zavala y Villela	January 1, 1695	1695	—
Juan Sáenz Cascante (Note: Replaced at some point by Pedro Lascano Zenteno Baldes, who concluded the year.)	Esteban de Urritia Oyanguren	January 1, 1696	1696	—
Pedro Villagómez la Raspuru	Manuel Francisco Clerque	January 1, 1697	1697	—
Nicolás de Mancilla y Villavicencio	Lucas de Vergara y Pardo (Note: Replaced by Pedro Lascano Zenteno y Baldés from June 6 (1699) onwards due to his appointment as Justicia Mayor of Jauja Province.)	January 1, 1698	1699	—
Pedro Romero de Camaño	Pedro de Castilla Altamirano	January 1, 1700	1700	—
Francisco Vásquez de Acuña y Zorrilla	Andrés de Zavala y Vilella	January 1, 1701	1701	—
Pedro Fernández de Avaito	Juan de Murga	January 1, 1702	1702	—
Martín José Mudarra de la Serna	Miguel de Mendoza y Dávalos	January 1, 1703	1703	—
Pedro Lascano de Zenteno y Baldés	Pedro Cavero (Note: Replacing José de Villalta due to José Terrones being ineligible as regidor perpétuo.)	January 1, 1704	1704	—
Cristóbal Mesía de Valenzuela	Manuel Francisco Clerque	January 1, 1705	1705	—
Luis de Vega y Celda	Francisco de Mendoza y Dávalos	January 1, 1706	1706	—
Gerónimo de Agüero y Añasco	Francisco Bravo de Lagunas y Castilla (Note: Replaced by Pedro Lascano Centeno y Valdés after being named Governor of Guayaquil.)	January 1, 1707	1707	—
Pedro de Llano de Zapata	Francisco Antonio de los Santos	January 1, 1708	1708	—
Francisco Álvarez Gato	Lucas de Vergara y Pardo	January 1, 1709	1710	—
Juan de Giles Cerbera y Lara	Martín José Mudarra de la Serna	January 1, 1711	1711	—
Juan de Sandoval y Guzmán	Baltasar de Castro Isásaga	January 1, 1712	1712	—
Juan José de Inclán	Enrique Jiménez de Lobaton y Azaña	January 1, 1713	1713	—
José Sarmiento de Sotomayor y los Ríos	Sebastián Palomino Rendón	January 1, 1714	1715	—
Carlos Pérez Manrique de Lara y Camberos	Ignacio de Morales y Aramburú	January 1, 1716	1716	—
García de Ijar	José de Velaochaga	January 1, 1717	1717	—
Sebastián de Palomino Rendón	José Sarmiento de Sotomayor y los Ríos	January 1, 1718	1718	—
Francisco Adrián de Oyagüe y Beingolea	Juan Bautista Palacios	January 1, 1719	1720	—
José Sarmiento de Sotomayor y los Ríos	Ignacio Morales de Aramburu	January 1, 1721	1721	—
Pablo de Segura y Zárate	Blas Reaño	January 1, 1722	1722	—
Melchor Malo de Molina y Espínola	Juan José de Aliaga y Sotomayor Oyague	January 1, 1723	1723	—
Pedro de la Fuente y Rojas	Tiburcio de Mendoza Ladrón de Guevara y Del Campo	1724	1724	—
Pedro de la Fuente y Rojas	Martín Zamudio de las Infantas	1724	1724	—
Tiburcio de Mendoza Ladrón de Guevara y Del Campo	Fernando Carrillo de Córdova	1725	1725	—
Martín Zamudio de las Infantas	José de Santa Cruz y Centeno	1726	1727	—
Luis Carrillo de Córdova y Garcés de Marcilla	Manuel Negrón y Luna	1728	1729	—
Francisco Agüero y de los Santos	Gregorio Matheu Villamayor	1730	1731	—
Agustín de Echevarría Zuloaga	Martín Zamudio de las Infantas	January 1, 1732	1732	—
Antonio Sancho Dávila y Bermúdez	Francisco Paredes Clerque	1733	1734	—
Jerónimo Boza de Lima y Solís	Diego Miguel (de la Presa) Carillo de Albornoz	January 1, 1735	1736	—
Carlos Fernando de Torres Messia y Pérez Manrique	Fernando Carrillo de Córdova	January 1, 1737	1738	—
Juan José de Aliaga y Sotomayor Oyague	Francisco de Robles Maldonado	January 1, 1739	1740	—
José Félix Vásquez de Velasco	Miguel José Muñoz Mudarra y Roldán	January 1, 1741	1742	—
José Cayetano Hurtado Dávila (Note: Member of the Order of Santiago; replaced by Joaquín Negrón Colmenares)	Miguel José Muñoz Mudarra y Roldán	January 1, 1743	1744	—
Bentura Jiménez Lobatón y Azaña	Fernando de la Fuente e Ijar	January 1, 1745	1745	—
Bentura Jiménez Lobatón y Azaña	Fernando de Carrillo Córdova	1746	1746	—
Vitorino Montero	Agustín de Salazar y Muñatones	January 1, 1747	1747	—
Gaspar de Velarde	Pedro Ortiz de Foronda	January 1, 1747	1747	—
Benito Rodríguez Altamirano y Tovar	Domingo de Chávez y Messía y Herrera	January 1, 1748	1748	—
José Javier de Buendía y Soto Puente	Juan Sancho Dávila y Castro	January 1, 1749	1749	—
Bentura Jiménez Lobáton y Azaña	Fermín Francisco de Carvajal-Vargas	January 1, 1750	1750	—
Alfonso José de los Ríos y Berriz y Miranda	Tadeo Martín de Zavala y Vásquez de Velasco (Note: Replaced by Francisco Lazcano de Baldes y Mendejar at the end of the year.)	January 1, 1751	1751	—
Alfonso José de los Ríos y Berriz y Miranda	Pedro de Boza y Guerra de la Daga	January 1, 1752	1752	—
José Bravo de Castilla	Joaquín de Mendoza Ladrón de Guevara y Fernández Maldonado	January 1, 1753	1753	—
José Félix Vásquez de Velasco y Peralta	Carlos Fernando de Torres Messía y Pérez Manrique	January 1, 1754	1754	—
Lucas de Vergara y Pardo	Agustín de Landaburu y Ribera	January 1, 1755	1755	—
José Rafael de Salazar y Traslaviña (Note: Replaced due to his absence by Alférez Francisco Lazcano from October 14 to December 7.)	Juan Manuel de Elcobarrutia	January 1, 1756	1756	—
Justino de Solórzano y Amuseo	Joaquín de Lama y Zúñiga	January 1, 1757	1757	—
Francisco Hurtado de Mendoza	Carlos de Angulo y Cabrera	January 1, 1758	1758	—
Alfonso Santa y Ortega	Juan de Palomares y Córdova (Note: Replaced by Francisco Centeno from around July 9 to October 1.)	January 1, 1759	1759	—
Manuel Antonio Jiménez de Lobatón y Costilla	Manuel Antonio Fernández de Paredes	January 1, 1760	1760	—
Pablo Vásquez de Velasco y Bernaldo-Quirós	Nicolás de Tagle-Bracho y Sánchez de Tagle	January 1, 1761	1761	—
Lorenzo de Zárate Agüero y Verdugo	Manuel Román de Aulestia	January 1, 1762	1763	—
Félix Morales de Aramburú	José de Antonio Borda Orozco y Peralta	January 1, 1764	1764	—
José Cavero Vásquez de Acuña	José de Seguroña	January 1, 1765	1765	—
Agustín de Landaburu y Ribera	Fernando Carrillo de Albornoz y Lagunas	January 1, 1766	1766	—
Manuel Fausto Gallegos y Dávalos	José Antonio de Salazar y Breña	January 1, 1767	1767	—
Juan José Vásquez de Acuña	Ignacio de los Santos Morales	January 1, 1768	1768	—
Pedro José de Zárate y Navia Bolaño	Nicolás Manrique de Lara y Carrillo de Albornoz	January 1, 1769	1770	—
Francisco Fernando Carrillo de Córdova y Sancho-Dávila	José Manuel de Tagle e Isásaga	January 1, 1771	1771	—
Tomás Muñoz Oyague	José de Querejazu y Santiago-Concha	January 1, 1772	1772	—
Domingo Muñoz y Oyague	Lorenzo de la Puente y Castro	January 1, 1773	1773	—
Juan Ortiz de Foronda	Francisco de Rosas y Zegarra	January 1, 1774	1774	—
Sebastián de Aliaga y Colmenares	Juan Agustín Baquíjano y Carrillo de Córdova	January 1, 1775	1775	—
Juan Estaban de la Puente Castro	José Quijano-Velarde y Tagle	January 1, 1776	1776	—
Felipe Sancho-Dávila y Salazar	Francisco José de la Puente y Sandoval	January 1, 1777	1777	—
Francisco Castrillón y Arango	Ignacio Cabero Vásquez de Acuña	January 1, 1778	1778	—
Isidro de Abarca	José Antonio de Lavalle y Cortés	January 1, 1779	1779	—
Francisco Ortiz de Foronda	Francisco de Ocharán y Mollinedo	January 1, 1780	1780	—
Fernando Rojas y Marres	Gaspar Remírez de Laredo y Calvo de Encalada	January 1, 1781	1781	—
Juan José de Belzunce y Salazar (Note: Replaced due to his absence by Juan Manuel de Buendía, Marquis of Castellon, from November 11 to 29.)	José Gonzáles Gutiérrez	January 1, 1782	1782	—
Joaquín de Abarca (Note: Replaced due to his absence by Juan Manuel de Buendía, Marquis of Castellon, from September 2 to 25.)	Francisco Calatayud y Borda	January 1, 1783	1783	—
Andrés Francisco de Maldonado y Salazar Robles	Manuel Lorenzo de León y Encalada	January 1, 1784	1784	—
Nicolás Sarmiento de Sotomayor del Campo	Juan Félix de Encalada Tello de Guzmán y Torres-Messía	January 1, 1785	1785	—
Juan Félix de Encalada Tello de Guzmán y Torres-Messía	Antonio de Boza y Garcés	January 1, 1786	1786	—
Antonio de Boza y Garcés	Antonio de Elizalde	January 1, 1787	1787	—
Antonio de Elizalde	José de Santiago Concha y Traslaviña	January 1, 1788	1788	—
José de Santiago Concha y Traslaviña	Francisco Arias de Saavedra y Santa Cruz	January 1, 1789	1789	—
Francisco Arias de Saavedra y Santa Cruz	Gaspar Carrillo de Albornoz y Vega	January 1, 1790	1790	—
Gaspar Carrillo de Albornoz y Vega	Matías Vásquez de Acuña Menacho y Aulestia	January 1, 1791	1791	—
Matías Vásquez de Acuña Menacho y Aulestia	Matías de la Torre Tagle y Quiroz	January 1, 1792	1792	—
Matías de la Torre Tagle y Quiroz	Miguel de Oyagüe y Sarmiento de Sotomayor	1793	1793	—
Miguel de Oyagüe y Sarmiento de Sotomayor	José María de la Fuente y Carrillo de Albornoz	January 1, 1794	1794	—
José María de la Fuente y Carrillo de Albornoz (Note: Replaced at some point by Juan Manuel de Buendía y Santa Cruz, Marquis of Castellon)	Tomas Muñoz y Lobatón	January 1, 1795	1795	—
Tomás Muñoz y Lobatón	Gaspar de Cevallos y Calderón	January 1, 1796	1796	—
Gaspar de Cevallos y Calderón	José Manuel González de la Fuente	January 1, 1797	1797	—
José Manuel González de la Fuente	Antonio José de Boza y Eslava	January 1, 1798	1798	—
Antonio José de Boza y Eslava	Fernando Carrillo de Córdova Mudarra	January 1, 1799	1799	—
Fernando Carrillo Mudarra	José Mariano de Sánchez-Boquete y Román de Aulestia	January 1, 1800	1801	—
José Mariano de Sánchez-Boquete y Román de Aulestia	Ignacio de Orúe y Mirones	January 1, 1801	1801	—
Tiburcio de Mendoza y los Ríos	Manuel de Agustín de la Torre Tagle	January 1, 1802	1802	—
Luis de Albo y Cabada	Andrés de Salazar y Muñatones	January 1, 1803	1803	—
José Álvaro Cabero y Taboada	José Ignacio Francisco Javier Palacios Aguirre	January 1, 1804	1804	—
Francisco de Alvarado y Vásquez de Velasco	José Antonio de Errea	January 1, 1805	1805	—
Manuel de Villar	Domingo de Orúe y Mirones	January 1, 1806	1806	—
Gaspar de Cevallos y Calderón	Antonio Álvarez Villar	January 1, 1807	1809	—
Fernando Carrillo de Albornoz y Salazar	José Matías Vásquez de Acuña Menacho y Ribera	January 1, 1810	1810	—
Andrés de Salazar y Muñatones	José Bernardo de Tagle y Portocarrero	January 1, 1811	December 13, 1812	—
José Cabero y Salazar	José Ignacio Francisco Javier Palacios Aguirre	December 13, 1812	1813	—
Juan Bautista de Lavalle y Zugasti	José María Sancho-Dávila y Salazar	January 1, 1814	December 31, 1814	—
José Antonio de Errea	Francisco Moreyra y Matute	December 31, 1814	1816	—
Isidro de Cortázar y Abarca	Manuel de la Puente y Querejazu	January 1, 1817	1818	—
José Manuel Blanco de Azcona	Tomás de la Casa y Piedra	January 1, 1819	December 1820	—
Isidro de Cortázar y Abarca	José María Galdeano y Mendoza	December 8, 1820	1821 (Note: José de San Martín declared the Spanish Constitution abolished through a decree on August 9, 1821, during the Peruvian War of Independence.)	—
Felipe Antonio Alvarado Toledo y Pimentel	Francisco Carrillo y Mudarra	January 1, 1822	1822	—
Juan de Echevarria y Ulloa	Francisco de Mendoza Ríos y Caballero	January 8, 1823	1823	—
Francisco de Mendoza Ríos y Caballero (Note: Replaced by Juan de Echevarría y Ulloa on March 11, themselves replaced on December 3 by José María Galdiano and Francisco de Mendoza Ríos y Caballero.)	Manuel Carrión	January 1, 1824	1824	—
José María Galdeano y Mendoza	Francisco de Mendoza Ríos y Caballero	1824	June 7, 1825	—
Manuel de Salazar y Vicuña	Pascual Antonio de Gárate y Milicua	June 7, 1825	1828	—
Mariano Gárate	Julián Piñeyro	January 1, 1829	1829	—
Julián Piñeyro	Martín Magan	January 14, 1830	1830	—
Martín Magan	Mariano Manfarres y Muchotrigo	January 1, 1831	1831	—
Mariano Manfarres y Muchotrigo	Francisco de Mendoza Ríos y Caballero	January 1, 1832	1832	—
Francisco de Mendoza Ríos y Caballero	Pascual Antonio de Gárate y Milicua	January 1, 1833	1833	—
Pascual Antonio de Gárate y Milicua	José Valerio Gassols	1834	February 22, 1835	—
Pedro Reyna	Manuel Menéndez Gorozabel	February 22, 1835	February 1, 1836	—
1836–1838: Recess in functions
Pedro Reyna	Manuel Menéndez Gorozabel	August 22, 1838	October 13, 1838	—N/a
1838–1839: Recess in functions
Pedro Reyna	Manuel Menéndez Gorozabel	February 18, 1839	November 22, 1839	—N/a
1839–1857: Municipalities replaced by Municipal Intendancies
Francisco González de Prada Marrón y Lombrera (Note: Periodically replaced by Deputy Mayor Miguel Pardo Iraola, and later Juan José Moreyra.)		May 15, 1857	1858	—N/a
Julián de Zaracondegui (Note: Did not take office: replaced by Deputy Mayor Miguel Pardo Iraola and then Estanislao Correa y Garay until his formal election as Mayor.)		1859	January 24, 1860	—N/a
Estanislao Correa y Garay		January 24, 1860	August 27, 1861	—N/a
Miguel Pardo Iraola		August 27, 1861	March 18, 1863	—N/a
Antonio Gutiérrez de la Fuente		March 18, 1863	January 8, 1866	—N/a
Antonio de Salinas-Varona y Castañeda (Note: Replaced in 1867 by Pablo de Vivero and José Bresani, successively.)		January 8, 1866	January 8, 1868	—N/a
Antonio Gutiérrez de la Fuente (Note: Replaced by José María de la Puente-Arnao y Oyague and José Maria Sancho-Dávila y Mendoza during the 1868–1869 period.)		January 8, 1868	1868	—N/a
José María de la Puente-Arnao y Oyague		1868	1868	—N/a
José Maria Sancho-Dávila y Mendoza		1868	1868	—N/a
José María de la Puente-Arnao y Oyague		1869	March 27, 1869	—N/a
Manuel Pardo y Lavalle		March 27, 1869	December 8, 1870	—N/a
Nemecio de Orbegoso y Martínez de Pinillos		December 8, 1870	August 2, 1872	—N/a
José Antonio García y García (Note: Did not take office.)		August 2, 1872	August 2, 1872	Civil Party
Federico Marriot y Rivero (Note: Replaced by Gaspar de la Fuente from November 15 to 25, 1872, and from January 26 to May 6, 1873.)		August 2, 1872	April 9, 1873	Civil Party
José Simeón Tejeda Mares		April 9, 1873	August 23, 1873	Civil Party
Aurelio Denegri Valega		August 24, 1873	March 4, 1875	Civil Party
Francisco Rosas Balcázar (Note: Replaced in his absence by Manuel Marcos Salazar.)		March 4, 1875	January 17, 1876	Civil Party
Ignacio de Osma y Ramírez de Arellano		January 17, 1876	October 1876	Civil Party
Manuel Candamo e Iriarte (interim)		October 1876	December 1876	Civil Party
Aurelio García y García		December 30, 1876	March 13, 1878	Civil Party
Pedro José Saavedra		March 13, 1878	January 4, 1879	—N/a
Francisco de Paula Secada Benavides		January 8, 1879	March 8, 1879	—N/a
Lizardo Montero Flores		March 8, 1879	1879	Civil Party
Manuel María del Valle (Note: Replaced in his absence by Pedro Correa y Santiago and later Guillermo A. Seoane.)		1879	January 14, 1880	—N/a
Melitón Porras Díaz		January 14, 1880	April 6, 1880	—N/a
Rufino Torrico de Mendiburu		April 6, 1880	March 31, 1881	—N/a
César Canevaro y Valega		April 1, 1881	December 9, 1881	—N/a
1881–1883: Recess in functions (Note: The dissolution of the Provincial Council of Lima, then occupied by the Chilean Army, was ordered by Patricio Lynch on December 9, 1881. It resumed functions on October 23, 1883, then under the government of Miguel Iglesias.)
Rufino Torrico de Mendiburu		October 6, 1883	1884	—N/a
Luis Roca y Boloña		January 26, 1884	October 29, 1884	—N/a
Ignacio de Osma y Ramírez de Arellano		October 29, 1884	May 23, 1886	—N/a
César Canevaro y Valega		May 23, 1886	1890	Constitutional Party
Juan Revoredo		1890	1893	Constitutional Party
Enrique Barreda y Osma		1894	1894	Civil Party
César Canevaro y Valega		1894	1895	Constitutional Party
Rufino Torrico de Mendiburu		1895	1895	—N/a
Manuel Olaechea Guerrero		1895	1895	Democratic Party
Ántero Aspíllaga Barrera		1896	1897	Civil Party
Juan Martín Echenique y Tristán		1898	1900	Democratic Party
Benjamín Boza Filiberto		1900	1900	Democratic Party
Federico Elguera Seminario		1901	1908	—N/a
Guillermo Billinghurst Angulo (Note: Billinghurst concluded his term in 1912 after being elected to the presidency.)		1909	1912	Democratic Party
Nicanor Carmona Vílchez		1912	1913	Constitutional Party
Elías Malpartida Franco		1914	1914	Democratic Party
Nicanor Carmona Vílchez		1915	1915	Constitutional Party
Luis Miró Quesada de la Guerra		1916	1918	Civil Party
Manuel Yrigoyen Diez Canseco		1919	1919	Civil Party
Ricardo Espinoza Medina		1920	1920	Civil Party
Pedro Mujica Carassa		1920	1921	—N/a
Pedro José Rada y Gamio		1922	1925	—N/a
Andrés Dasso Hoke		1926	1929	—N/a
Luis Albizuri Elejalde		1930	1930	—N/a
Luis A. Eguiguren		1930	1931	Social Democratic Party
José de la Riva-Agüero y Osma		1931	1932	Revolutionary Union
José Manuel García Bedoya		1932	1933	Revolutionary Union
Luis Gallo Porras		1934	1937	MDP
Eduardo Dibós Dammert		1938	1940	Revolutionary Union
Luis Gallo Porras		1941	1945	MDP
Augusto Benavides Diez Canseco		1946	1947	—N/a
Luis Gallo Porras		1948	1949	MDP
Pedro Pablo Martínez		1949	1950	—N/a
Eduardo Dibós Dammert		1950	1952	—N/a
Luis T. Larco Ferrari		1953	1955	—N/a
Héctor García Ribeyro		1956	1962	—N/a
José Jacinto Rada		1962	1963	—N/a
Ana Fernandini Clotet		March 14, 1963	December 31, 1963	—N/a
Luis Bedoya Reyes		January 1, 1964	December 31, 1969	Christian Democracy - PPC
Eduardo Dibós Chappuis		January 1, 1970	January 15, 1973	—N/a
Lizardo Alzamora Porras		January 1, 1973	December 31, 1975	—N/a
Arturo Cavero Calisto		1975	1977	—N/a
Enrique Falconí Mejía		1977	1978	—N/a
Roberto Carrión Pollit		1978	1979	—N/a
Piero Pierantoni Cámpora		January 2, 1980	December 31, 1980	PPC
Eduardo Orrego Villacorta		January 1, 1981	December 31, 1983	Popular Action
Alfonso Barrantes Lingán		January 1, 1984	December 31, 1986	United Left
Jorge del Castillo Gálvez		January 1, 1987	December 31, 1989	APRA
Ricardo Belmont Cassinelli		January 1, 1990	December 31, 1995	OBRAS
Alberto Andrade Carmona		January 1, 1996	December 31, 2002	We Are Lima
Luis Castañeda Lossio		January 1, 2003	October 11, 2010	National Solidarity
Marco Parra Sánchez (interim)		October 11, 2010	December 31, 2010	National Solidarity
Susana Villarán de la Puente		January 1, 2011	December 31, 2014	Social Force
Luis Castañeda Lossio		January 1, 2015	December 31, 2018	National Solidarity
Jorge Muñoz Wells		January 1, 2019	May 4, 2022	Popular Action
Miguel Romero Sotelo		May 9, 2022	December 31, 2022	Popular Action
Rafael López Aliaga		January 1, 2023	October 13, 2025	Popular Renewal
Renzo Reggiardo		October 13, 2025	Incumbent	Popular Renewal

== See also ==
- Taulichusco
- Timeline of Lima
- Metropolitan Municipality of Lima
