= Tristán del Pozo House =

House in Arequipa, Peru

Casa Tristán del Pozo
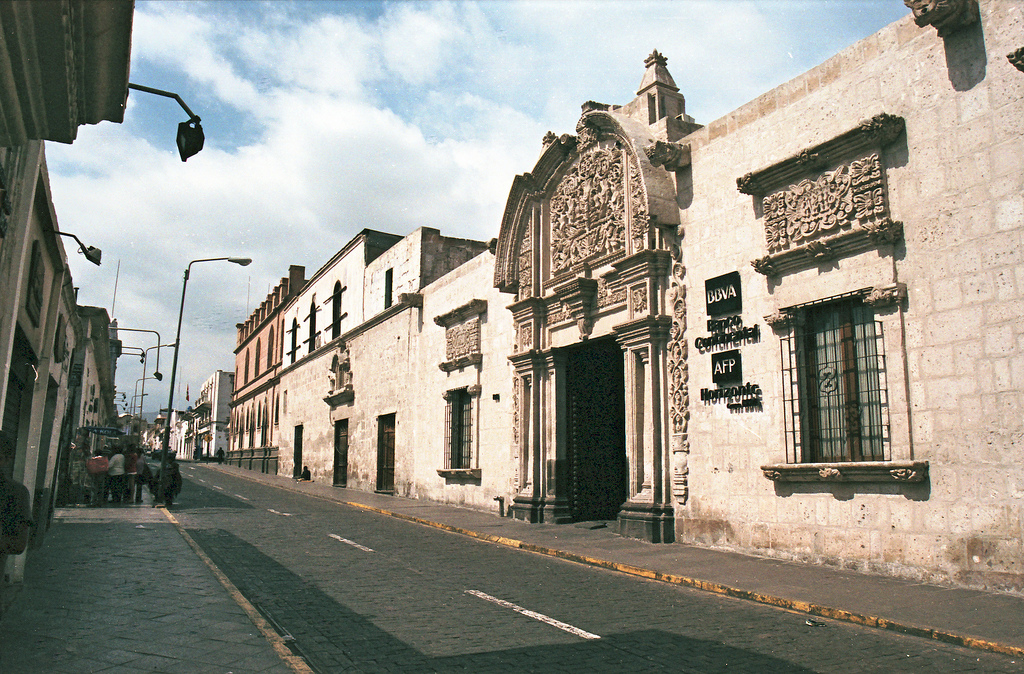
- The building in 2008
- Interactive map of the Casa Tristán del Pozo area
- Alternative names: Casa Ricketts

General information
- Location: Arequipa, Peru
- Construction started: 1738
- Owner: BBVA Perú (since 1974)

Technical details
- Floor count: 1

The Tristán del Pozo House, later the Ricketts House, is a Spanish-era andean baroque house in Arequipa, Peru. The house began construction in 1738 after being commissioned by its first owner, Domingo Carlos Tristán del Pozo, and has gone through several owners, being owned by BBVA Perú since 1974.

== History ==
The house was commissioned in 1738 to be the residence of its first owners, Domingo Carlos Tristán del Pozo and his wife Ana María Carazas, this period of the house's ownership was described by another member of the Tristán family, Flora Tristan. The couple acquired the solar where the Andrés de Rosas and brothers House stood on June 24, 1736. Since then, the house has been owned by people such as José Joaquín Tristán; Camillian Bishop Manuel Abad Yllana, as well as Colonel Antonio Gutiérrez de Otero y Santayana, Pío de Tristán, etc.

The house was acquired by BBVA Perú in 1974, and by 2014 hosted the bank's offices, an art gallery inaugurated in 2009, and a small museum.

== Description ==
The house is located in San Francisco street, close to the Plaza de Armas of the city. It features an andean baroque style, arched structures and courtyards on the inside, and is one of the few buildings from the Spanish-era that have preserved all the different decorations and features that have adorned the place since its inception.

The art gallery inside the building features works by artists, such as Carlos Baca-Flor, Jorge Vinatea Reinoso and Teodoro Núñez Ureta.

== See also ==
- Tristán family:
  - Pío de Tristán
  - Domingo Tristán
  - Flora Tristán
  - Victoria Tristán, wife of President of Peru José Rufino Echenique
