= Juan Martín Echenique =

Peruvian politician

- Juan Martín Echenique y Tristán
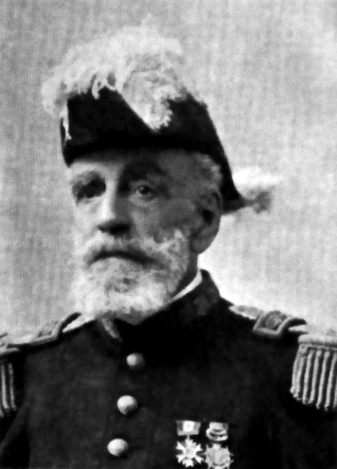

Mayor of Lima
- In office 1898–1899
- Preceded by: Antero Aspíllaga
- Succeeded by: Benjamín Boza

Personal details
- Born: 1841 Lima, Peru
- Died: May 26, 1912 Lima, Peru
- Party: Democratic
- Parents: José Rufino Echenique (father); Victoria Tristán (mother)

Juan Martín Echenique y Tristán (1841 – May 26, 1912) was a Peruvian politician and soldier who served as the Mayor of Lima from 1898 to 1899. He was the son of José Rufino Echenique, who served as President of Peru and Victoria Tristán. During his military career, Juan fought for Peru during the Chincha Islands War against Spain.

== Biography ==
Echenique was born in 1841 in Lima, Peru to José Rufino Echenique and Victoria Tristán de Echenique, the daughter of the last Viceroy of Peru, Pío de Tristán. He began his military training as a cadet in 1851. In 1853, he entered the Chorrillos Military School, where he studied until November 1854. In 1855, he was forced into exile in the United States with his father due to the Liberal Revolution of 1854.
