= Luis T. Larco =

Peruvian politician

Luis T. Larco was a Peruvian politician in the early 1950s. He was the mayor of Lima from 1953 to 1955.

Preceded by Eduardo Dibós Dammert	Mayor of Lima; 1953–1955	Succeeded by Héctor García Ribeyro
