= Andrés F. Dasso =

Peruvian politician

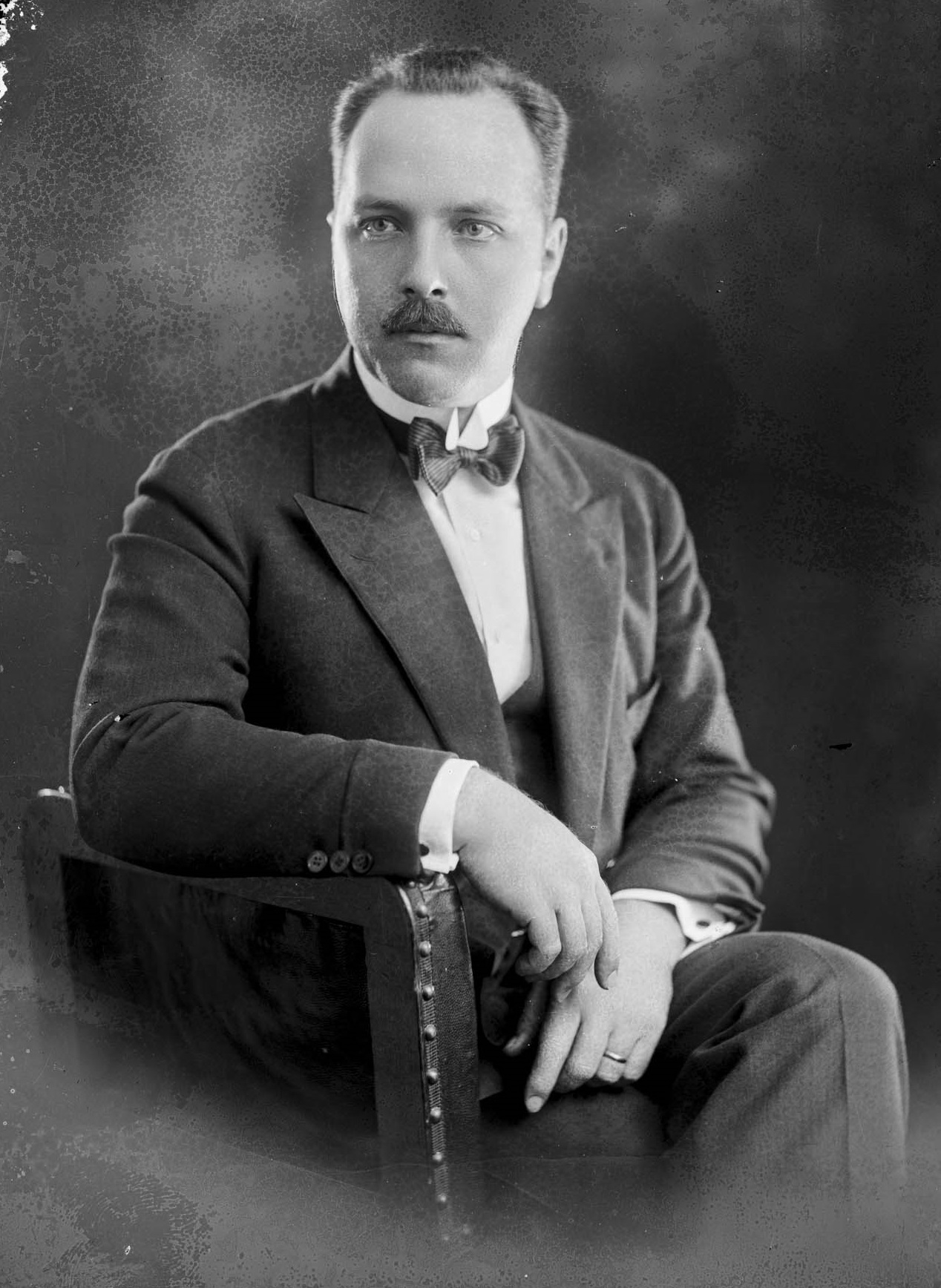
Andrés F. Dasso

Andrés Fernando Dasso Hoke (16 June 1893 in Lima – 1958), was a Peruvian politician.

Born the fourth of 11 children to Andrea and María Josefina (Hoke) Dasso.

His father, Andrea Dasso, had emigrated to Argentina in 1870 and in 1875 emigrated to Peru. In 1900 Andrea created a partnership with Luigi Sanguineti that operated as "Sanguineti & Dasso." The business was involved in the urban expansion of Lima and in the provision of electrical services to the city in the new sub-urban centers.

Andrés F. Dasso was educated at the "Colegio Italiano de Lima" (Italian School of Lima) also known as "Instituto Humberto I." In 1919, he married María Luisa Valle (the daughter of Tomás and Cristina (Valle) Valle; and had 4 children: Lilly, Andrés T., Rosa, and Tomás.

He became the mayor of Lima from 1926 to 1929. In 1930 he became a Senator and later Minister of Economy and Finance in 1950. He became president of the Central Reserve Bank in 1952 and served until 1958.

Preceded by Pedro José Rada y Gamio	Mayor of Lima; 1926–1929	Succeeded by Luis Albizuri
