= Lizardo Alzamora Porras =

Peruvian politician (1928–2021)

Jose Lizardo Aristides Antonio Alzamora Porras (30 December 1928 – 27 August 2021) was a Peruvian politician in the early 1970s. He was the mayor of Lima from 1973 to 1975. Alzamora Porras died on 27 August 2021, at the age of 92.

Preceded by Eduardo Dibós Chappuis	Mayor of Lima; 1973–1975	Succeeded by Arturo Cavero Calisto
