= Pedro Mujica Carassa =

Peruvian politician (1875–1933)

Pedro Mujica Carassa (29 June 1875 – 21 July 1933) was a Peruvian politician in the early 20th century, who served as the mayor of Lima from 1920 to 1921. His father, Elías Mujica y Trasmonte, was a senator, and a major commercial figure who founded the Banco Internacional del Perú in 1897. Before she became mayor, she ventured a bit into agriculture for cotton and food.

| Preceded by Ricardo Espinoza | Mayor of Lima; 1920–1921 | Succeeded by Pedro José Rada |
