= Benjamín Boza =

Peruvian politician

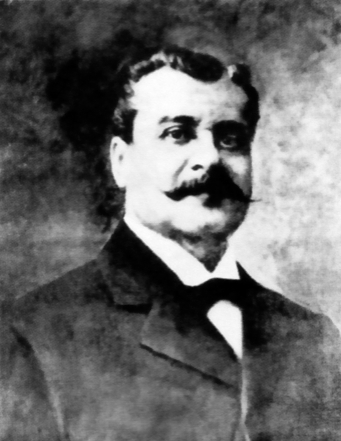
Benjamín Boza

Benjamín Boza (1846 - 1921) was a Peruvian politician in the early 20th century. Boza served as the President of the Senate from 1899 to 1900. He was the mayor of Lima from 1900 to 1901.

Preceded by Juan Martín Echenique	Mayor of Lima; 1900–1901	Succeeded by Federico Elguera
