= Federico Elguera =

Peruvian politician

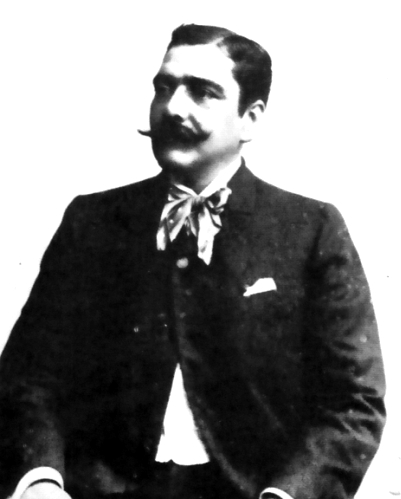
Federico Elguera, was a Peruvian politician in the early 20th century.

Federico Elguera Seminario (1860–1928) was a Peruvian politician in the early 20th century. Elguera was born in Lima on 1 June 1860. He was the mayor of Lima from 1901 to 1908 and Ambassador to Bolivia from 1911 to 1912.

Elguera died on 19 November 1928.

Preceded by Benjamín Boza	Mayor of Lima; 1901–1908	Succeeded by Guillermo Billinghurst Angulo
