= Ramón Herrera =

Ramón Herrera may refer to:

- Ramón Herrera y Rodado (1799–1882), Chilean soldier
- Ramón Herrera (footballer) (1907–1960), Spanish footballer
- Mike Herrera (baseball) (1892–1978), Cuban baseball player
