= Roberto Carrión Pollit =

Peruvian politician

Roberto Carrión Pollit (7 November 1929 – 17 April 2007) was a Peruvian politician in the late 1970s. He was the mayor of Lima from 1978 to 1979.

Preceded by Enrique Falconí Mejía	Mayor of Lima; 1978–1979	Succeeded by Piero Pierantoni Cámpora
