= Luis Miró Quesada =

Peruvian politician, diplomat and journalist (1880–1976)

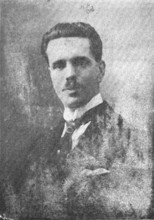
- Born: 5 December 1880; Lima
- Died: 24 March 1976 (aged 95)
- Family: Miró Quesada family

Luis Joaquín Miró-Quesada de la Guerra (1880–1976) was a Peruvian journalist and politician in the early 20th century. He was the mayor of Lima from 1916 to 1918 and the Minister of Foreign Affairs in 1931. He was also the director and editor of the influential newspaper El Comercio.

He studied at Universidad Mayor de San Marcos.

== Biography ==
His father was José Antonio Miró Quesada, owner of the daily newspaper El Comercio, and his mother was Matilde de la Guerra Gorostide.

Preceded by Nicanor Carmona	Mayor of Lima; 1916–1918	Succeeded by Manuel Yrigoyen
