= Luis Gallo Porras =

Peruvian politician (1894–1972)

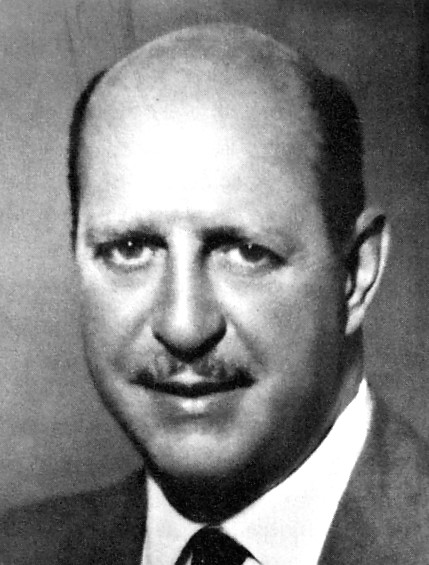
Luis Gallo Porras

Luis Gallo Porras (9 November 1894 – 22 June 1972), was a Peruvian politician from the early 1930s to the late 1950s. He was the mayor of Lima three times, first from 1934 to 1937, second from 1941 to 1945, and third from 1948 to 1949. From 1958 to 1959 he served as Prime Minister of Peru under Manuel Prado Ugarteche. He was minister of economy and finance from 1958 to 1959. He served as the first vice president from 1956 to 1962. He was President of the National Club from 1946 to 1948.

Political offices
Preceded by José Manuel García Bedoya	Mayor of Lima; 1934–1937	Succeeded by Eduardo Dibós Dammert
Preceded by Eduardo Dibós Dammert	Mayor of Lima; 1941–1945	Succeeded by Augusto Benavides Canseco
Preceded by Augusto Benavides Canseco	Mayor of Lima; 1948–1949	Succeeded by Pedro Pablo Martínez
Preceded by Manuel Cisneros Sánchez	Prime Minister of Peru; 1958–1959	Succeeded by Pedro Beltrán Espantoso
