= Pedro Pablo Martínez =

Peruvian politician

Pedro Pablo Martínez Ledesma was a Peruvian politician in the late 1940s. He was the mayor of Lima from 1949 to 1950.

Preceded by Luis Gallo Porras	Mayor of Lima; 1949–1950	Succeeded by Eduardo Dibós Dammert
