= Enrique Falconí Mejía =

Peruvian politician

Enrique Falconí Mejía was a Peruvian politician in the late 1970s. He was the mayor of Lima from 1977 to 1978.

Preceded by Arturo Cavero Calisto	Mayor of Lima; 1977–1978	Succeeded by Roberto Carrión Pollit
