= Canseco (surname) =

Canseco is a surname. Notable people with the surname include:

- Ana Maria Canseco (born 1967), Mexican television personality
- Augusto Benavides Canseco, Peruvian politician
- Carlos Canseco (1921–2009), Mexican physician and philanthropist
- George Canseco (1934–2004), Filipino songwriter
- Javier Díez Canseco (born 1948), Peruvian politician
- Jose Canseco (born 1964), Cuban-American baseball player and manager
- Ozzie Canseco (born 1964), Cuban-American baseball player, twin brother of Jose
- Pedro Diez Canseco (1815–1893), Peruvian soldier, politician, and interim President of Peru
- Quico Canseco (born 1949), American politician
