= Ricardo Espinoza =

Peruvian politician

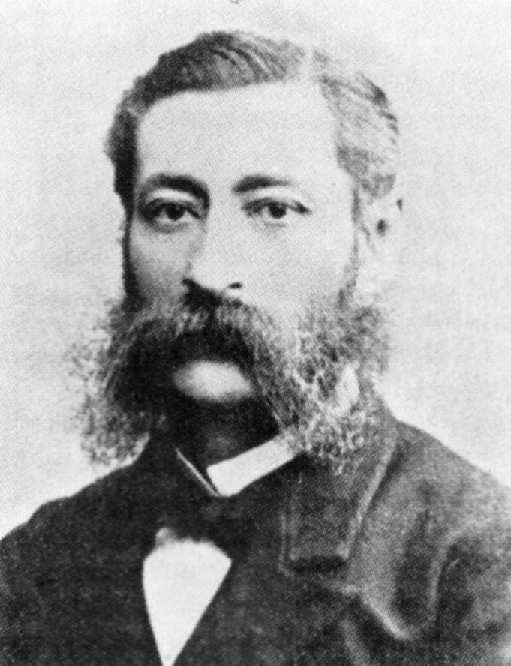

Ricardo Espinoza was a Peruvian politician in the early 20th century. He was the mayor of Lima in 1920.

Preceded by Manuel Yrigoyen Diez Canseco	Mayor of Lima; 1920	Succeeded by Pedro Mujica Carassa
