= Piero Pierantoni Cámpora =

Peruvian politician

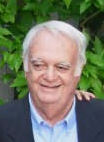
Piero Pierantoni Cámpora

Piero Pierantoni Cámpora (24 October 1932 in Genoa – 10 September 2009 in Lima) was a Peruvian politician in the early 1980s. He was the Mayor of Lima in 1980.

Preceded by Roberto Carrión	Mayor of Lima; 1980	Succeeded by Eduardo Orrego
