= Pío de Tristán =

18/19th-century Peruvian Royalist politician and military leader

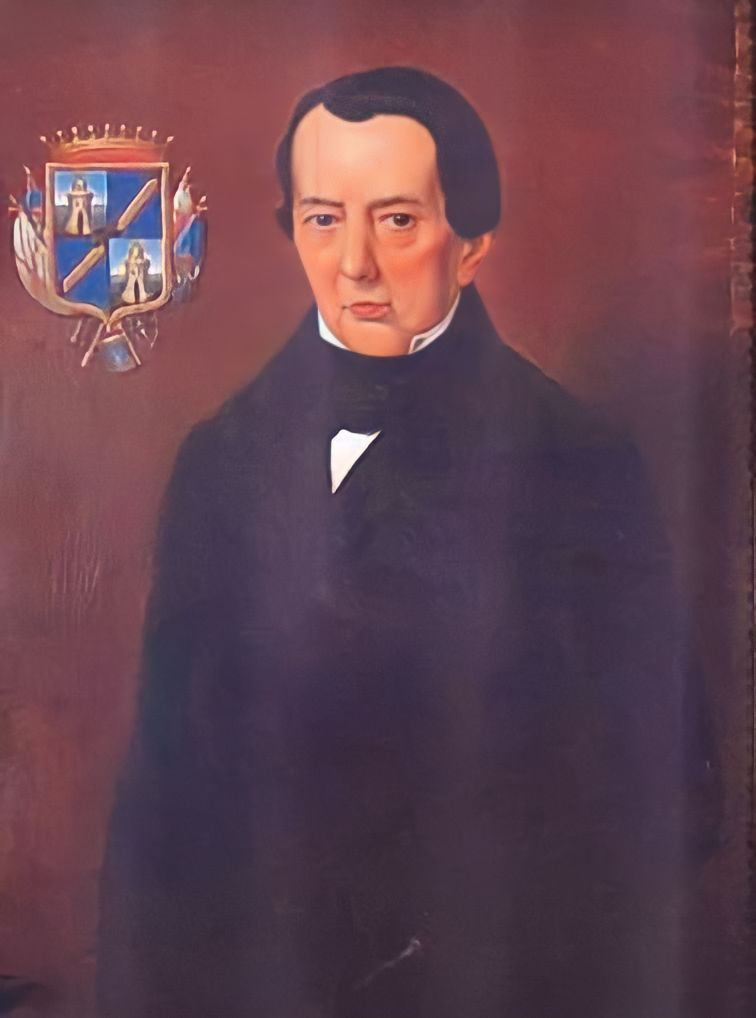
- Pío de Tristán, the last Viceroy of Peru

Interim Protectorate of the Peru-Bolivian Confederation
- In office January 24, 1837 – April 10, 1837
- Preceded by: Andrés de Santa Cruz
- Succeeded by: Andrés de Santa Cruz

Interim Viceroy of Peru
- In office December 9, 1824 – December 30, 1824
- Monarch: Ferdinand VII
- Preceded by: José de la Serna
- Succeeded by: Position abolished

2nd President of South Peru
- In office October 12, 1838 – February 23, 1839
- Preceded by: Ramón Herrera y Rodado
- Succeeded by: Position abolished

Personal details
- Born: July 11, 1773 Arequipa, Peru
- Died: August 24, 1859 (aged 86) Lima, Peru
- Resting place: General Cemetery of Lima
- Relatives: Flora Tristan, niece
- Occupation: Politician, general
- Known for: Last Spanish viceroy of Peru, last president of South Peru

Military service
- Allegiance: Spain
- Years of service: c. 1780–1824
- Rank: Field marshal
- Battles/wars: Rebellion of Túpac Amaru II War of the Pyrenees; Chuquisaca Revolution; Latin American Wars of Independence: Bolivian War of Independence; Battle of Huaqui; Argentine War of Independence; Battle of Tucumán; Battle of Salta (POW); Peruvian War of Independence; Cuzco Rebellion of 1814: Battle of Apacheta

Juan Pío Camilo de Tristán y Moscoso (July 11, 1773, Arequipa – August 24, 1859, Lima) was a Peruvian general and politician who served as the second President of South Peru from October 12, 1838 to February 23, 1839. He was nominally the last viceroy of Peru, serving in that capacity from December 9 to December 30, 1824, but not exercising power.

== Biography ==
=== Early career ===
Tristán was born in Arequipa to a wealthy family descended from the House of Borgia, something which he felt proud of. Later in life, Tristán y Moscoso went to Spain, where he fought the French in the War of the Convention (1793–1795). On his return to Peru he was elected alcalde (mayor) of Arequipa (1808). He was a general in the Royalist army in Peru. In June 1811 he fought as part of the victorious Royalist forces in the Battle of Guaqui.

=== Battle of Salta ===
He led a Royalist force into the territory of present-day Argentina after the Battle of Guaqui. He was defeated at Tucumán and again at Salta, by one of his classmates at Salamanca, rebel General Manuel Belgrano. The Battle of Salta took place on February 20, 1813. Belgrano had been sent by the Second Triumvirate (of insurgents in Buenos Aires) to attack the city, at the northern extremity of the old Viceroyalty of Rio de la Plata. This he did, completely defeating the troops of Tristán. It was the first military victory achieved under the flag of Argentina.

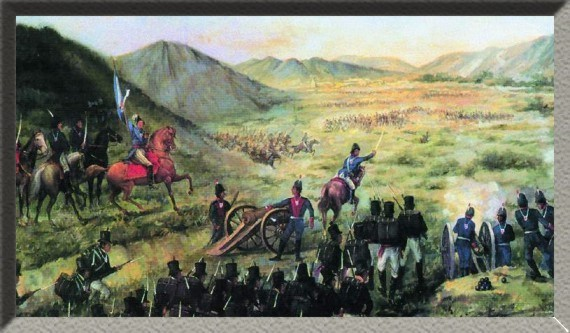
The Battle of Salta, 1813

After his defeat, Tristán signed a 40-day truce and returned to Peru. The defeat of the Royalists at Salta gave the insurgents domination over the northern part of the old viceroyalty and also led to revolts against the Spanish in Charcas, Potosí and, later, Cochabamba, Upper Peru (now Bolivia). At the expiration of the truce, General Belgrano followed Tristán into Upper Peru, entering the territory of Charcas on May 7, 1813. However, Belgrano was defeated at Vilcapugio on November 1, and again at Ayohuma on November 14.

=== Political career ===
The December 1824 defeat of Viceroy José de la Serna in the Battle of Ayacucho effectively ended Spanish power in Peru. Tristán was the most senior Spanish military officer in the colony, and as such he assumed the office of provisional viceroy, solely for the purpose of transferring power to the nationalists.

After this, he chose to stay in Peru, and was active in Peruvian politics. He exercised the functions of prefect and commander in Arequipa. Then he was Peruvian minister of war and marine. He was Minister of Finance of Peru in 1836. He participated in the creation of the Peruvian-Bolivian Confederation and served as its foreign minister. From October 12, 1838 to February 23, 1839 he was president of the state of South Peru within the Confederation. He died in Lima in 1859.

He later lived in the Tristán del Pozo House, formerly owned by some relatives, and is described, by his niece, Flora Tristan, in her travel book Pérégrinations d'une paria (Peregrinations of a Pariah, 1838). Flora Tristan was a feminist and socialist writer, and, incidentally, the maternal grandmother of French painter Paul Gauguin.

== See also ==
- Tristán family:
  - Domingo Tristán
  - Flora Tristán
  - Victoria Tristán, wife of President of Peru José Rufino Echenique

Government offices
Preceded by José de la Serna	Viceroy of Peru; 1824–1826	Succeeded by none (post abolished)
Preceded by Ramón Herrera y Rodado	President of South Peru; 1838–1839	Succeeded by none (post abolished)
