= Victoria Tristán =

Victoria Tristán de Echenique

First Lady of Peru
- In office April 20, 1851 – January 5, 1855
- President: José Rufino Echenique
- Preceded by: Micaela de Echevarría
- Succeeded by: María Josefa Pinillos y Cacho

Personal details
- Born: Leandra Josefa Victoria Tristán y Flores del Campo; 13 January 1823 Arequipa, Peru
- Died: 31 May 1864 (aged 41) Lima, Peru
- Relations: Flora Tristán (cousin); Clemente Althaus (cousin)
- Children: 9, including José María and Juan Martín
- Parent(s): Pío de Tristán; María Joaquina Flores del Campo y Tristán
- Nickname: Doña Victoria de Echenique

Leandra Josefa Victoria Tristán y Flores del Campo (January 13, 1823 – May 31, 1864) was the First Lady of Peru from 1851 to 1855, during her marriage to the President of Peru, José Rufino Echenique. The district of La Victoria in Lima was named in her honor.

== Biography ==
Tristán was the daughter of Juan Pío de Tristán y Moscoso, who was appointed interim viceroy of Peru after the capitulation of Ayacucho, and of María Joaquina Flores del Campo y Tristán, both from Arequipa. Her family was one of the wealthiest families in Peru during the 19th century. She was the first cousin of Flora Tristán and the writer Clemente Althaus.

On January 8, 1838, at the Sagrario Church, 14-year-old Victoria married General José Rufino Echenique, with whom she had nine children. Among her descendants would be General Juan Martín Echenique y Tristán, the banker Francisco Echenique Bryce and writer Alfredo Bryce Echenique.

She was the owner of vast estates located in what is now the Park of the Exhibition in the district of La Victoria, which would be later named in her honor. A lavish party was held there on Saturday, October 15, 1853, attended by ministers of state, the diplomatic corps, members of the Supreme Court and other select authorities and personalities of Lima. The party was described by Ricardo Palma in his book, Peruvian Traditions. According to Palma, the party had so much resonance throughout the country that, as a consequence of it, due to the waste and excess of luxury shown, which appeared as an insult to the general poverty of the country, civil war broke out.

In May 1864, she made her will in the presence of Marshal Antonio Gutiérrez de la Fuente. She died at 41 and was buried in the Presbítero Maestro Cemetery. Her death caused her husband great grief, but he was able to serve in the congress, where he had been recently elected.

== See also ==
- Tristán family:
  - Pío de Tristán
  - Domingo Tristán
  - Flora Tristán
