= Eduardo Dibós Dammert =

Peruvian politician

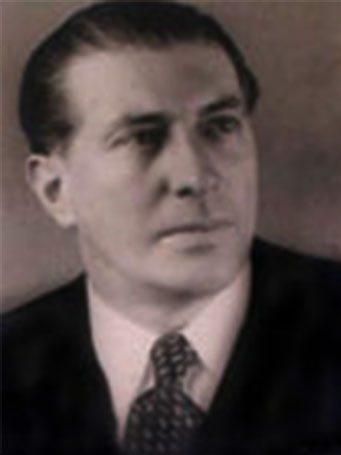
Eduardo Dibós Dammert

Eduardo Dibós Dammert (1898 – 1987, Lima) was a Peruvian politician from the late 1930s to the early 1950s. He was the mayor of Lima twice: first, from 1938 to 1940 and second, from 1950 to 1952.

The arena Coliseo Eduardo Dibos in San Borja District is named after him.

His son Eduardo "Chachi" Dibós Chappuis was also Mayor of Lima from 1970 to 1973.

Preceded by Luis Gallo Porras	Mayor of Lima; 1938–1940	Succeeded by Luis Gallo Porras
Preceded by Pedro Pablo Martínez	Mayor of Lima; 1950–1952	Succeeded by Luis T. Larco
