= Caminos del Inca Rally =

Off-road rally event

- Category: Rally
- Region: Peru
- Inaugural season: 1966
- Drivers' champion: (Peru) André Martinez (Argentina) Matias Aranguren

The Caminos del Inca Rally (Spanish: Rally Caminos del Inca) or simply "Caminos del Inca", formerly known as the Gran Premio Nacional de Carreteras (lit. 'Grand National Highways Award'), is an annual multi-stage rally race organised by the Peruvian Automobile Club (ACP) since 1966. It is considered the country's most important racing event, and its route—which crosses central and southern Peru—covers a total distance of 2,695 kilometres (1,675 mi).

== History ==
The first rally took place in 1966, divided into three categories for different car sizes. It concluded on November 6, with the arrival of Henry Bradley Unzueta's Volvo Amazon, then car number 302. Its Lima–Huancayo route originally covered a distance of 306 kilometres (190 mi), after which it was shortened to 267 kilometres (166 mi). It surged in popularity following its 1970 edition and, since 1971, it is part of the international calendar of the Fédération Internationale de l'Automobile (FIA).

The event did not take place from 2020 to 2021 due to the then ongoing COVID-19 pandemic, returning only in 2022 with a symbolic start at Magdalena del Mar District's Costa Verde road.

== Route ==
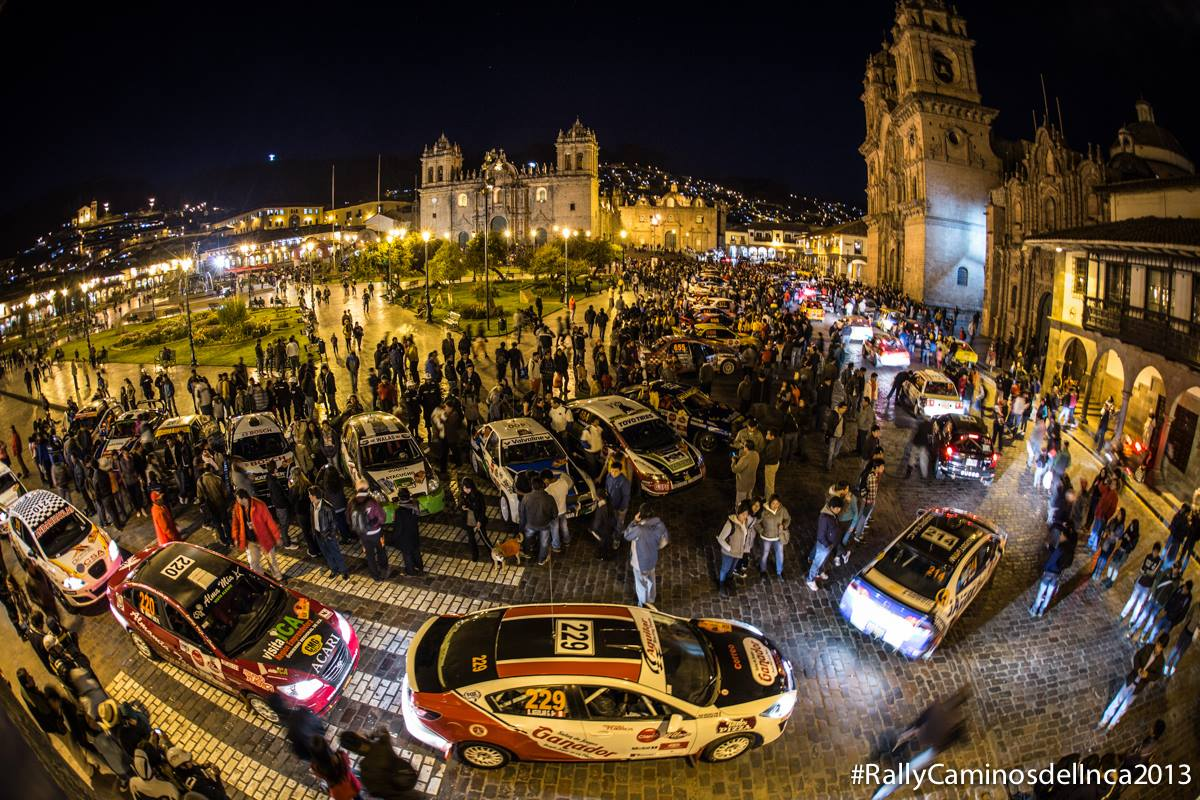
Start of the 2013 race in Cuzco.

The 2,695 kilometres (1,675 mi) race starts in Lima, and its route travels through Huancayo, Ayacucho, Cuzco, and Arequipa, returning to the country's capital. It has also previously included Bolivian territory. The race's 2013 edition inverted the route's regular path, a change proposed several times before by former participants, such as Thomas Hearne in the 1970s, and Ernesto "Neto" Jochamowitz in 1998.

The country's geography presents the foremost danger, and has taken the lives of a number of pilots, including Esteban Quispitupa, Emilio Fort, "Kike" Zúñiga, Pepe Llona and Abraham Ortega, among others.

== Winners ==
As of 2026, the most recent winner is 2025's André Martinez and Matias Aranguren. The following is a list of previous winners:

Year	Crew	Country	Car
1966	Henry Bradley - César Vidaurre	(Peru) (Peru)	Volvo Amazon
1967	Arnaldo Alvarado - Enrique Alvarado C.	(Peru) (Peru)	Ford Mustang
1968	Henry Bradley - César Vidaurre	(Peru) (Peru)	Mercedes-Benz
1969	Tony Fall - Gunnar Palm	(England) (Sweden)	Ford Escort
1970	Henry Bradley - César Vidaurre	(Peru) (Peru)	Ford Escort
1971	Teodoro Yangali - Elías Yangali	(Peru) (Peru)	Shelby GT 350 H
1972	Teodoro Yangali - Elías Yangali	(Peru) (Peru)	Shelby GT 350 H
1973	Bratzo Vicich - Luis del Solar	(Peru) (Peru)	Shelby GT 350 R
1974–1975: Government ban
1976	Henry Bradley - César Vidaurre	(Peru) (Peru)	Toyota Corona (Avensis)
1977	Dieter Hubner - Alfredo Méndez	(Bolivia) (Bolivia)	Ford Escort
1978	Herbert Grimm - Tater Ledgard	(Peru) (Peru)	Datsun 160J
1979	Henry Bradley - César Vidaurre	(Peru) (Peru)	Toyota Corona (Avensis)
1980	Henry Bradley - Eduardo Capamadjian	(Peru) (Peru)	Toyota Corona (Avensis)
1981	Julio Cesar de las Casas - Francesco Galletti	(Peru) (Peru)	Ford Escort
1982–1984: Cancelled due to the ongoing conflict
1985	Jorge Koechlin - Miguel Tudela	(Peru) (Peru)	Nissan Silvia
1986	Ricardo Dasso - Carlos Rey	(Peru) (Peru)	Toyota Celica
1987	Pedro Roca - Santiago Echecopar	(Peru) (Peru)	Toyota Corona (Avensis)
1988	Henry Bradley - Miguel Baca	(Peru) (Peru)	Toyota Celica
1989	José Camacho - Juan Calizaya	(Bolivia) (Bolivia)	Toyota Corolla
1990	Luis Alayza de Losada - Ive Bromberg	(Peru) (Peru)	Nissan Silvia
1991	Ricardo Flores - Ricardo Alayza	(Peru) (Peru)	Toyota Celica
1992	Raúl Orlandini Dibós - Oscar Dávila	(Peru) (Peru)	Nissan Silvia
1993	Raúl Orlandini Dibós - Oscar Dávila	(Peru) (Peru)	Nissan Silvia
1994	Raúl Orlandini Dibós - Oscar Dávila	(Peru) (Peru)	Nissan Silvia
1995	Luis Alayza de Losada - Ive Bromberg	(Peru) (Peru)	Nissan Silvia
1996	Oscar Dufour - Ricardo Tovar	(Peru) (Peru)	Suzuki Vitara
1997	Ramón Ferreyros - Gonzalo Sáenz	(Peru) (Peru)	Peugeot 306
1998	Ernesto Jochamowitz - Luis Miguel Soto	(Peru) (Peru)	Ford Escort Gr A
1999	Ernesto Jochamowitz - Luis Miguel Soto	(Peru) (Peru)	Ford Escort WRC
2000	Eduardo Dibós Silva - Gustavo Medina	(Peru) (Peru)	Toyota Celica
2001	Eduardo Dibós Silva - Gustavo Medina	(Peru) (Peru)	Toyota Celica
2002	Eduardo Dibós Silva - Ive Bromberg	(Peru) (Peru)	Toyota Celica
2003	Raúl Orlandini Dibós - Juan Pedro Cilloniz	(Peru) (Peru)	Mitsubishi Lancer
2004	Luis Alayza de Losada - Luis Alayza Freundt	(Peru) (Peru)	Subaru Forester
2005	Raúl Orlandini Dibós - Ive Bromberg	(Peru) (Peru)	Mitsubishi Lancer
2006	César Cataño - José Luis Tommasini	(Peru) (Peru)	Mitsubishi Lancer
2007	Ernesto Jochamowitz - Gustavo Medina	(Peru) (Peru)	Mitsubishi Outlander
2008	Roberto Pardo - Giampier Giachetti	(Peru) (Peru)	Subaru Impreza
2009	Nicolás Fuchs - Juan Pedro Cilloniz	(Peru) (Peru)	Mitsubishi Lancer Evolution IX
2010	Raúl Orlandini Griswold - Diego Zuloaga	(Peru) (Peru)	Mitsubishi Lancer Evolution IX
2011	Raúl Orlandini Griswold - Juan Pedro Cilloniz	(Peru) (Peru)	Mitsubishi Lancer Evolution IX
2012	Nicolás Fuchs - Ive Bromberg	(Peru) (Peru)	Mitsubishi Lancer Evolution IX
2013	Richard Palomino - José María Rodríguez	(Peru) (Argentina)	Mitsubishi Lancer Evolution IX
2014	José Luis Tommasini - Juan Pedro Cilloniz	(Peru) (Peru)	Mitsubishi Lancer Evolution IX
2015	José Luis Tommasini - Juan Pedro Cilloniz	(Peru) (Peru)	Mitsubishi Lancer Evolution IX
2016	John Navarro G. - Raúl Orlandini Griswold	(Peru) (Peru)	Mitsubishi Lancer Evolution IX
2017	Raúl Orlandini Griswold - John Navarro G.	(Peru) (Peru)	Mitsubishi Lancer Evolution IX
2018	Richard Palomino - Augusto Larrea	(Peru) (Ecuador)	Mitsubishi Evo X
2019	Luis Alayza Freundt - Carlos Ganoza	(Peru) (Peru)	Toyota GT86
2020–2021: Cancelled due to the ongoing pandemic
2022	Ronmel Palomino - Guillermo Sierra	(Peru) (Peru)	Toyota Yaris N5
2023	Nicolás Fuchs - Fernando Mussano	(Peru) (Argentina)	Ford Fiesta Rally3
2024	Eduardo Castro - Diego Vallejo	(Peru) (Spain)	Ford Fiesta Rally3
2025	André Martinez - Matias Aranguren	(Peru) (Argentina)	Ford Fiesta Rally3

== See also ==
- 2019 Dakar Rally
