= Nicolás de Ribera =

Spanish conquistador (1487–1563)

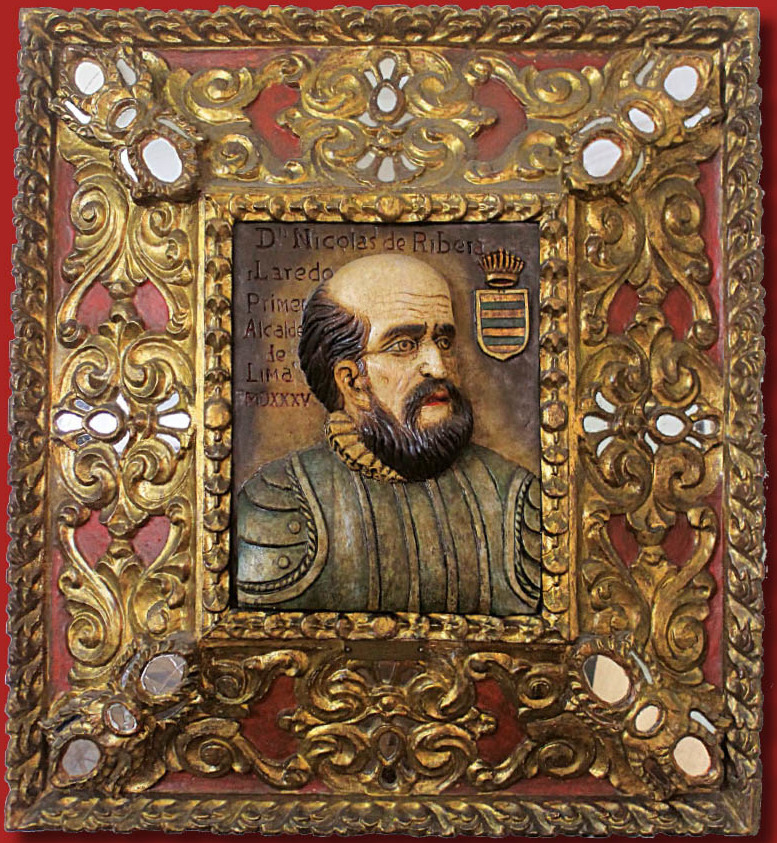
Nicolás de Ribera

Nicolás de Ribera, El Viejo (Olvera, Spain, 1487 – Lima, 1563) was a Spanish conquistador and the first mayor of Lima.

== See also ==
Famous Thirteen
