= Arturo Cavero Calisto =

Peruvian politician

Arturo Cavero Calisto was a Peruvian politician in the late 1970s. He was the mayor of Lima from 1975 to 1977. He was a strong advocate of women's rights.

Preceded by Lizardo Alzamora Porras	Mayor of Lima; 1975–1977	Succeeded by Enrique Falconí Mejía
