= Luis Albizuri =

Peruvian politician

Luis Albizuri was a Peruvian politician in the early 20th century. He was the mayor of Lima in 1930.

Preceded by Andrés F. Dasso	Mayor of Lima; 1930	Succeeded by Luis A. Eguiguren
