= Eduardo Dibós Chappuis =

Peruvian racing driver and politician

Eduardo Dibós Chappuis (22 June 1927 – 15 October 1973), called "Chachi", was a Peruvian racing driver and politician in the early 1970s. He was the mayor of Lima from 1970 to 1973. He was son of Eduardo Dibós Dammert.

Dibós raced in the 1959 Daytona 500, the inaugural edition of the race. He owned a very important Ferrari motorcar from 1961 until Jan 1965 - A 250 SWB Berlinetta Serial number 03175, believed to be the 250 GTO Prototipo vehicle. He raced this car in many races, including the 1964 24 Hours of Daytona finishing 10th in Class, to the likes of Pedro Rodriguez, Phil Hill & David Piper all driving superior 250 GTO machines.

== Early life and education ==
Dibós was born on June 22, 1927 to Eduardo Dibós Dammert and Rina Chappuis Castagnino. His father became a mayor of Lima, Peru. At an early age, he became interested in racing. He studied engineering at the Massachusetts Institute of Technology (MIT) in 1947.

== Racing career ==
=== NASCAR ===
In 1959, Dibós, alongside fellow Peruvian driver Raul Cilloniz, traveled to Florida to compete in the inaugural running of the Daytona 500. Driving the No. 37 Thunderbird for team owner Van Acker, he finished fifth in the 40-lap qualifying race, and started ninth on the day of the race. However, he fell out of the race early with a suspension issue and finished 48th. He returned later that year to compete in the inaugural Firecracker 250. He qualified third and finished fifth in what would be his final Cup race.

=== Peruvian circuit ===
As President of the Peruvian Automobile Club (ACP), Dibós was the manager of the Caminos del Inca racing competition in 1966.

== Political career ==
On December 16, 1969, Dibós was appointed mayor of Lima. He initiated several infrastructure projects including restoring the municipal theater and constructing roads connecting to the Costa Verde.

== Personal life ==
Dibós married Betty Silva. They had ten children, including Juan Antonio Dibós, ACP president Eduardo 'Chachito' Dibós, and actress Denisse Dibós. His brother, Iván Dibós, is an honorary member of the International Olympic Committee and former Lieutenant Mayor of Lima under Ricardo Belmont.

== Death and legacy ==
Dibós died suddenly in Munich, Germany on October 15, 1973, at the age of 46. The cause of death was a heart attack, which cut short his mayoral term.

On December 17, 2022, a monument and commemorative plaque dedicated to him were inaugurated in the Miraflores District in Lima.

Preceded by Luis Bedoya Reyes	Mayor of Lima; 1970–1973	Succeeded by Lizardo Alzamora Porras
