= Diez Canseco =

Diez Canseco is the last name/surname of several Peruvian politicians.

- Ana Elena Townsend Diez Canseco, Congresswoman from 2001 to 2006
- Francisco Diez Canseco, President of Peru in 1872
- Javier Diez Canseco, Peruvian Congressman and presidential candidate in the 2006 elections
- Manuel Yrigoyen Diez Canseco, Mayor of Lima from 1919 to 1920
- Pedro Diez Canseco, President of Peru in 1863, 1865, and 1868
- Raúl Diez Canseco, Vice President of Peru from 2001 to 2004

== See also ==
- Alfredo Pareja Diezcanseco
