= Jorge Koechlin =

Peruvian politician and former racing driver

Personal details
- Born: February 12, 1950 (age 76) Huacho, Peru
- Party: Christian People's Party; National Solidarity (2006–2017)
- Relatives: Pedro Koechlin (brother)
- Education: Colegio de la Inmaculada; University of Lima

Jorge Koechlin von Stein (German pronunciation: [kˌoːɛçlˈiːn fˈɔn ʃtˈa͡ɪn]; born February 12, 1950) is a Peruvian former racing driver, magazine publisher and politician. Since 2003, he is the conductor of Automundo, a TV programme dedicated to automobiles.

== Biography ==
Koechlin began racing professionally in Formula Ford Merlyn Mk20A, and then in a works Elden Mk8C making his debut on a self built car F3 Elden at Thruxton 1974 in the British F3 Championship, European Formula Renault Europe in 1975 in a works Lola run by Mader Racing out of Switzerland, racing against Didier Pironi, René Arnoux, Jean-Louis Schlesser, then made starts in various European Formula Three series in 1977 with little success around the top-ten. In 1982, he was one of only ten competitors in the struggling British Formula One Championship, also known as the Aurora Formula One Championship and finished tied for fourth in points for his own Amazon Motorsports Team Peru that fielded a retired Williams FW07 getting the pole at his home track of Brands Hatch and finished second in debut at Donington Park behind Jim Crawford. The following year, he was named to a Teddy Yip Theodore Racing entry for the Indianapolis 500 but the car never appeared. He later returned to make one CART Championship Car start at Laguna Seca Raceway driving an Eagle Cosworth, but was knocked out by a broken gearbox after qualifying 26th and running as high as eighth.

Koechlin later purchased Automundo Magazine which would become one of the most successful Spanish language Hispanic/Latino auto consumer magazines in the United States. Later for 10 years, he broadcast car races for ESPN International under 'el hermano peruano' (the Peruvian brother), moniker in use up to today calling the Grand Am Rolex Championship for Canal Speed, a Fox television channel. His company AutoMundo Productions, Inc. produced 2 weekly television shows for ESPN, weekly news segments for Univision News, and has finished a 52 half-hour episodes for Fox Latin American Channels (FLAC). 2011 he produced 26 original concept one hour TV Show 'La Escuderia' for FLAC dedicated to Latin up and coming drivers in International fields. He went on to drive a Mitsubishi WRC EVO-IX in his home Gran Premio Nacional de Carreteras los Caminos del Inca which he won in 1985, winning again on his return in his Class N4L and 4th. Overall. The Caminos del Inca 'reality show' a 4 One Hour each episodes was broadcast over 80 hours during January to April 2012. Currently is producing 4 weekly television weekly shows, 3 in Peru, and 1 in DirecTV US and hosting several weekly auto car reviews for MSN Latino as their main TV Auto Test content provider in Spanish.

== See also ==
- Raúl Orlandini
- Thomas Hearne (racing driver)
