= Manuel Yrigoyen Diez Canseco =

Peruvian politician (1873–1933)

Manuel Yrigoyen Diez-Canseco (1873 in Lima, Peru – 25 May 1933 in Lima) was a Peruvian politician in the early 20th century. He was the mayor of Lima from 1919 to 1920, succeeding Luis Miró Quesada and preceding Ricardo Espinoza. He was also a congressman and president of the National Club.

He was son of the former prime minister Manuel Yrigoyen Arias and Mercedes Diez-Canseco Olazabal. On 3 October 1900, he married Angelica Puente in Lima. On 6 June 1910 at 8:30 P.M., their daughter Adelina Yrigoyen Puente was born in Lima.

== See also ==
- Pedro de Yrigoyen y Loyola, his grandfather
