= Augusto Benavides Diez Canseco =

Peruvian politician

Augusto Benavides

Mayor of Lima
- In office 1946–1947
- Preceded by: Luis Gallo Porras
- Succeeded by: Luis Gallo Porras

Personal details
- Born: September 14, 1889 Lima, Peru
- Died: 1975 (aged 85–86) Lima, Peru
- Spouse: Luisa Revett Montero
- Children: 3
- Relatives: Pedro Diez Canseco; Francisco Diez Canseco; Alfredo Benavides
- Occupation: Architect, politician

César Augusto Víctor Benavides Díez-Canseco (1889 – 1975) was a Peruvian architect and politician in the late 1940s who served as the Mayor of Lima from 1946 to 1947.

== Early life ==
Benavides was born in Lima in 1889, the son of Alfredo Benavides Cornejo and María Diez-Canseco Coloma. The latter was the daughter a niece of former presidents Pedro and Francisco Diez-Canseco y Corbacho. His siblings were Alfredo (1881–1967), who worked as a diplomat and government worker, Alberto (1891–1949), who worked as a lawyer and judicial officer, and Francisca, who married Óscar R. Benavides, a distant relative. Benavides himself married Luisa Revett Montero, with whom he had three daughters: Luisa, Juana and Augusta.

== Political career ==
Unlike his brothers, Benavides stayed out of politics and did not belong to a political party. Nevertheless, he developed a friendship with Víctor Raúl Haya de la Torre, founder of the American Popular Revolutionary Alliance (APRA), who sought refuge at his house during the 1930s. In 1933, shortly before the assassination of Luis Miguel Sánchez Cerro, he reportedly served as a liaison between the then-imprisoned Haya de la Torre and general Benavides, with both parties reaching an understanding despite their political inclinations. He served as mayor of Lima from 1946 to 1947.

== Architectural career ==
Benavides had a style considered ahead of its time, defined as "Andean" or "Serrano", related to the Neo-Colonial Style. He designed a number of houses, including one called "La Tapada," in Los Cóndores, a neighbourhood of Chaclacayo whose project—in which his nephew Alfredo Benavides Barreda assisted—began in 1942 and took 10 years to complete.

Benavides also designed Leguía Avenue, Miraflores Central Park and the Malecón de la Reserva.

== See also ==
- Óscar R. Benavides

Preceded by Luis Gallo Porras	Mayor of Lima; 1946–1947	Succeeded by Luis Gallo Porras
