= Peruvian Automobile Club =

Peruvian racing association

- Automóvil Club Peruano
- Abbreviation: ACP
- Formation: April 16, 1942; 84 years ago
- Founded at: Lima, Peru
- Type: Nonprofit
- Headquarters: Lima, Peru
- President: Eduardo Espino Carrillo
- Website: www.automovilclubperuano.com

The Peruvian Automobile Club (Spanish: Automóvil Club Peruano; ACP) is a Peruvian non-profit automobile racing club. It organises rally racing events, notably the Caminos del Inca and Rally ACP events, considered symbolic to the country's racing industry.

== History ==
The club was founded in 1942 by a group composed of Luis Mannarelli, Francisco Agüero, Augusto Malachowski, Francisco Santa Cruz, Enrique Forno, Henry Bradley Barnett, Eduardo Martinez, Guillermo Piccone, Julio Maschi, Francisco Camino, Luis Salvi, Luis Barestein, Carlos Stein, José Delfín, Julio Huasasquiche and siblings Ernesto and Alfonso Peyón. Its first organised event was the 1948 South American Grand Prix, and it was officially recognised by the Peruvian government on July 7, 1949. Its foremost race, the Gran Premio Nacional de Carreteras, later known as the Caminos del Inca, first took place on November 6, 1966.

== Organisation ==
=== Events ===
The ACP is in charge of the following rally racing events:

- Caminos del Inca: considered the country's most representative race.
- Baja Inka: a rally raid event. In 2016, its participants gained access to the following year's Dakar Rally.
- ACP Rally: with five annual stages, the best known are the Premio Gobierno Regional de Lima, the Premio Presidente de la República (since 1939), and other stages (including Asia, Huaral, Huaura, Chilca, Cañete, and Norte Chico).

=== Leadership ===
The club is headed by a president. The president for the 2026–2027 period is Eduardo Espino Carrillo.

1. Luis Mannarelli Forcelledo (1942–1949)
2. Pedro De Las Casas Frayssinet (1950–1951)
3. Alfredo Bryce Lostaunau (1952–1953)
4. Eduardo Cillóniz Oberti (1954)
5. Santiago Poppe Yesup (1955)
6. Pedro De Las Casas Frayssinet (1956)
7. Eduardo Dibós Chappuis (1957–1959)
8. Augusto Blacker Murrieta (1961)
9. Sandro Montalbetti Catanzaro (1962–1965)
10. Eduardo Dibós Chappuis (1965–1971)
11. Evans Tapia Escobedo (1971)
12. Miguel Navarro Grau (1972–1974)
13. Guillermo Arteaga Ralston (1974–1976)
14. Tomás Nadramia Lale (1976–1981)
15. Carlos Lorca Collantes (1982–1983)
16. Luis Rizo Patrón Pásara (1983–1984)
17. Tomás Nadramia Lale (1985–1990)
18. Eduardo Dibós Silva (1990–1991)
19. Alfredo Muro Souza Ferreyra (1991–1992)
20. Luis Alayza de Losada (1993)
21. Ricardo Flores Chipoco (1994–1996)
22. Sandro Montalbetti Catanzaro (1997)
23. Fernando Falcón De Las Casas (1998)
24. Javier Rodríguez Cuadros (1999)
25. Ricardo Flores Chipoco (2000–2007)
26. Eduardo Dibós Silva (2008–2015)
27. Luis Alayza de Losada (2016–2019)
28. Javier Rodríguez Cuadros (2020–2021)
29. Luis Alayza Freundt (2022–2025)
30. Eduardo Espino Carrillo (2026–2027)

== Participation ==
- 2012 Dakar Rally
- 2013 Dakar Rally
- 2013 NACAM Rally Championship

== See also ==
- Touring and Automobile Club of Peru
