= Geography of Peru =

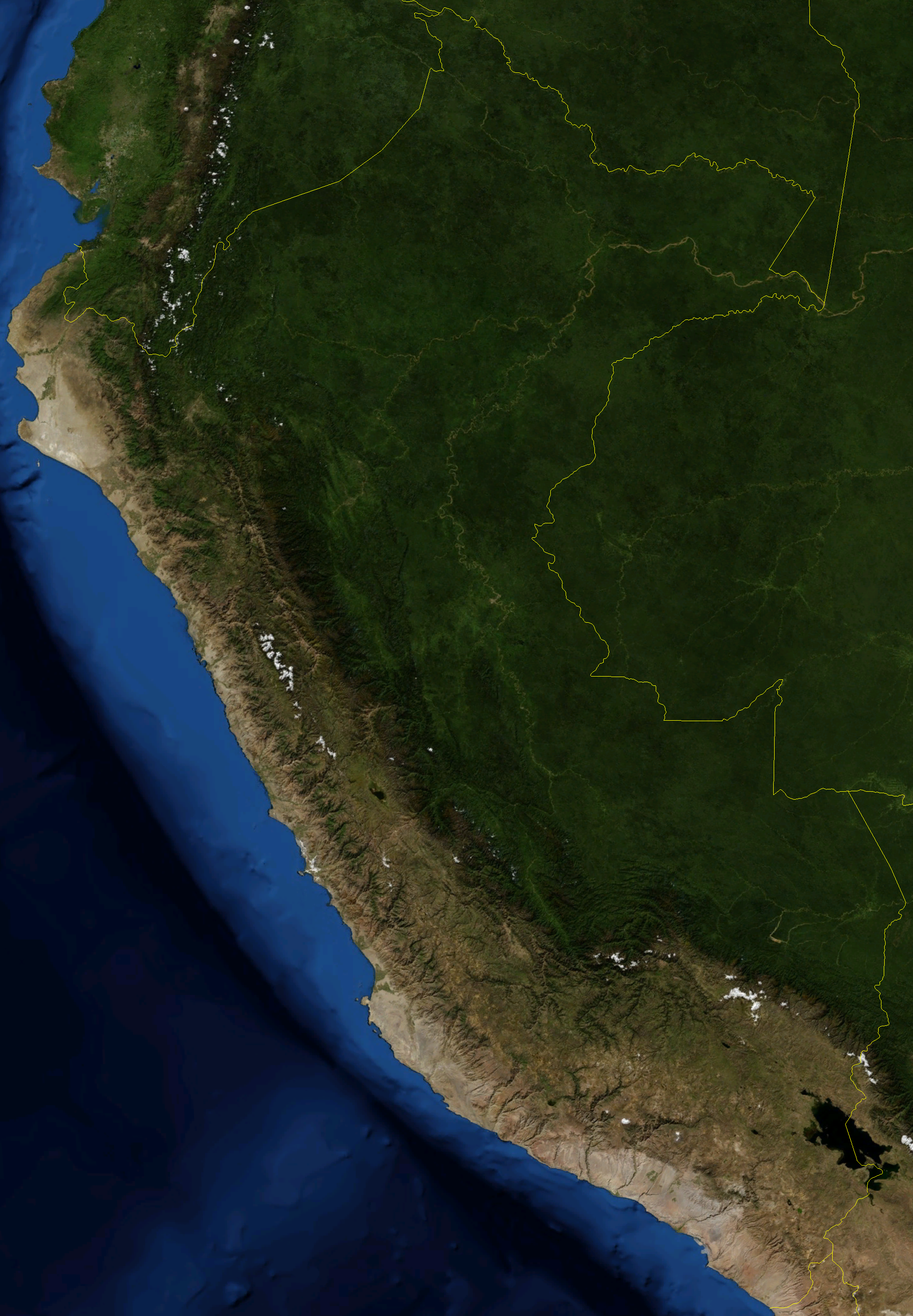
- Satellite image of Peru
- Continent: South America
- Coordinates: 10°00′S 76°00′W
- Area: Ranked 20th
  - Total: 1,285,215.6 km^{2} (496,224.5 sq mi)
  - Land: 99.6%
  - Water: 0.4%
- Coastline: 3,080 km (1,910 mi)
- Borders: Total land borders: 7,461 km Bolivia: 1,075 km Brazil: 2,995 km Chile: 171 km Colombia: 1,800 km Ecuador: 1,420 km
- Highest point: Huascarán Sur, 6,768 metres (22,205 ft)
- Lowest point: Bayóvar Depression, −34 metres (−112 ft)
- Largest lake: Lake Titicaca
- Exclusive economic zone: 906,454 km^{2} (349,984 mi^{2})

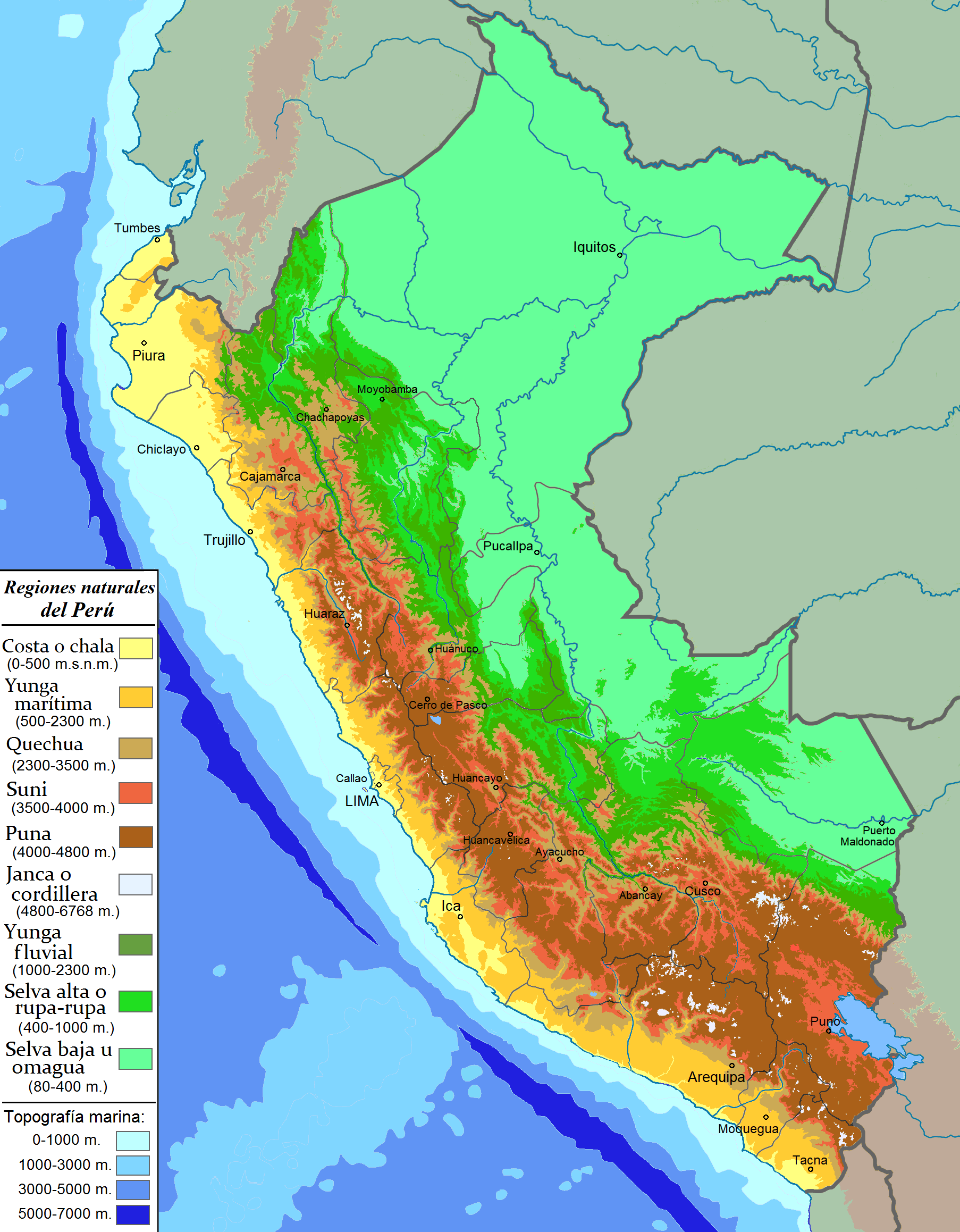
Peruvian natural regions according to Javier Pulgar Vidal.

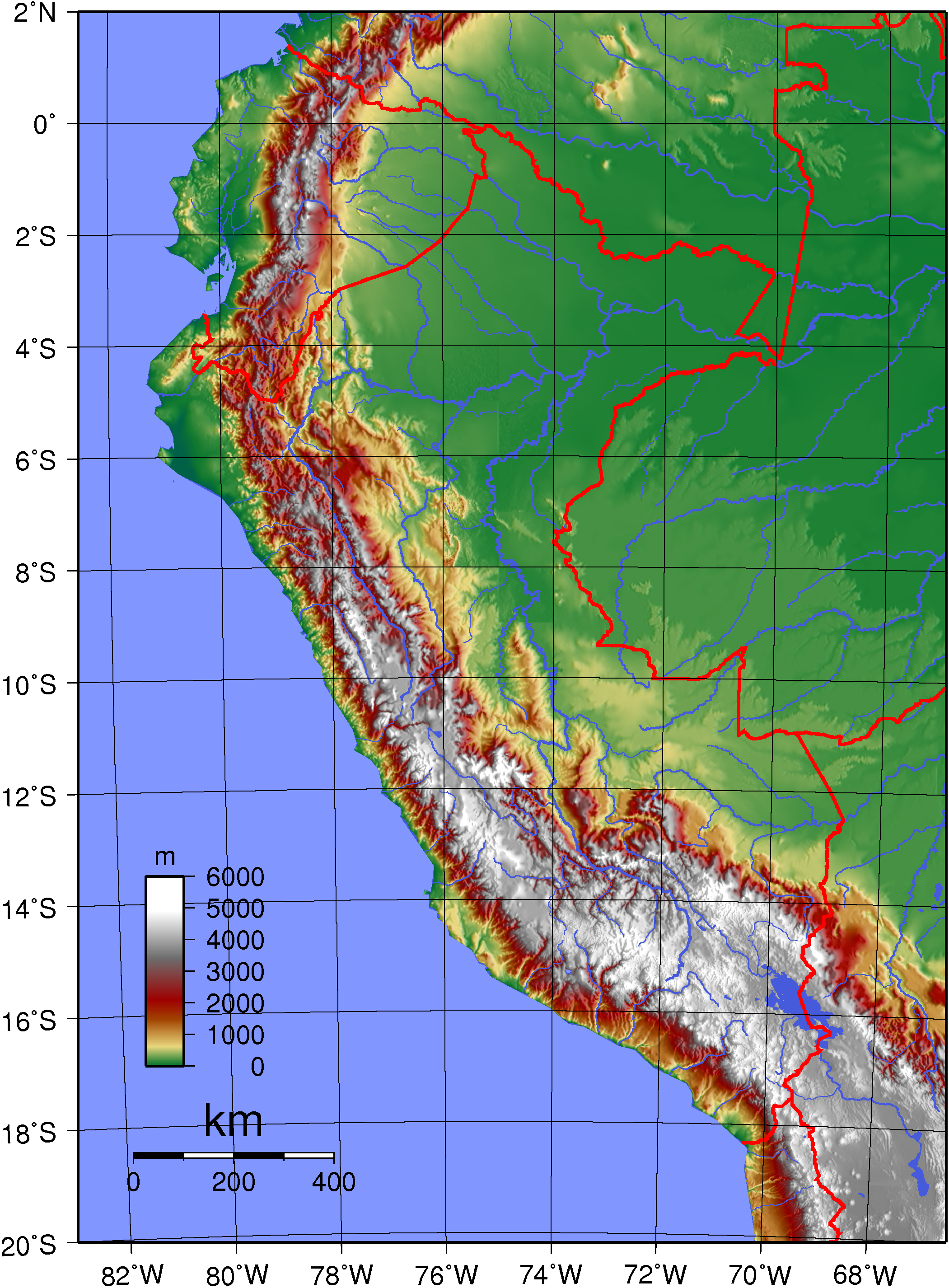
Topographic map of Peru

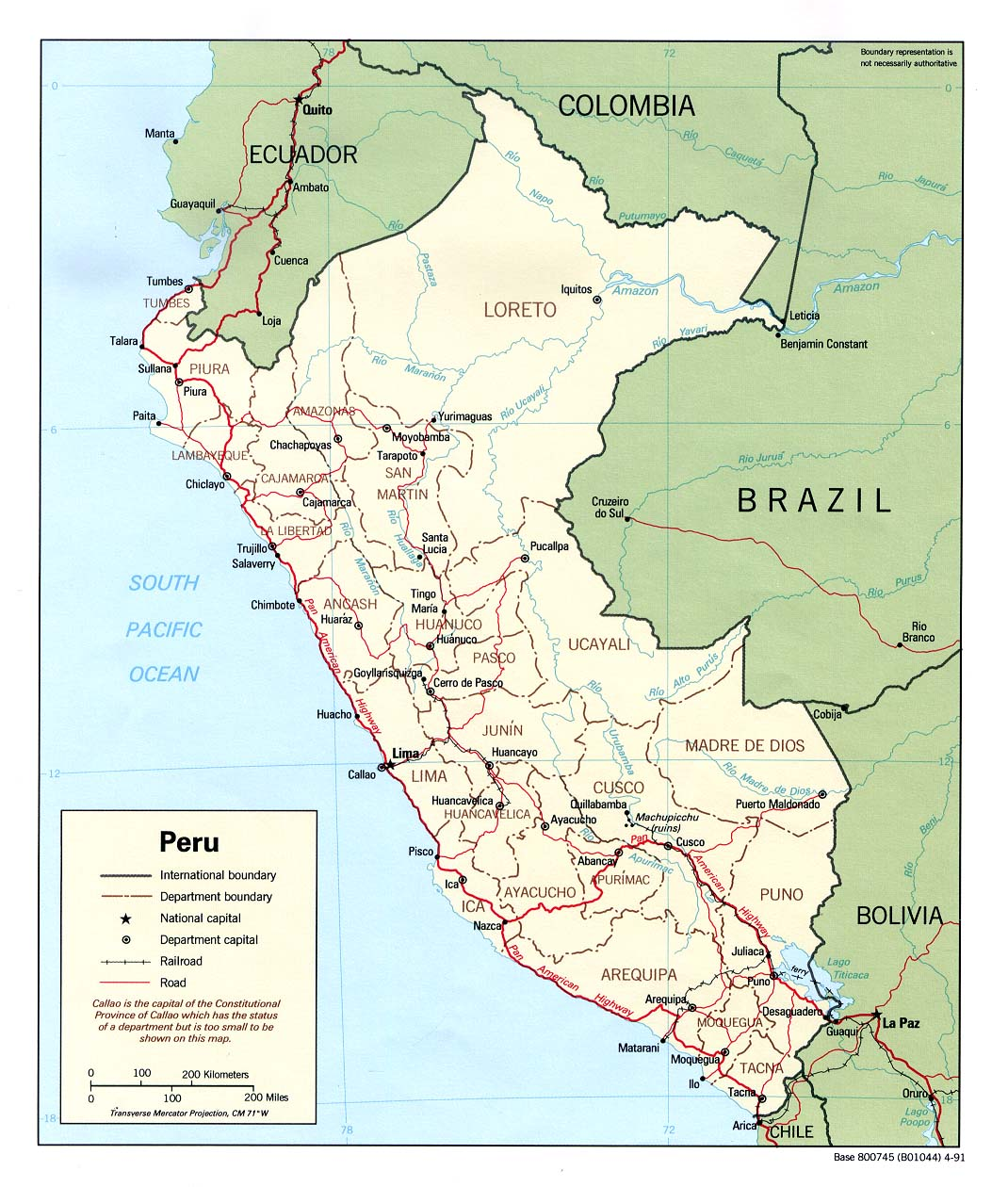
Political map of Peru

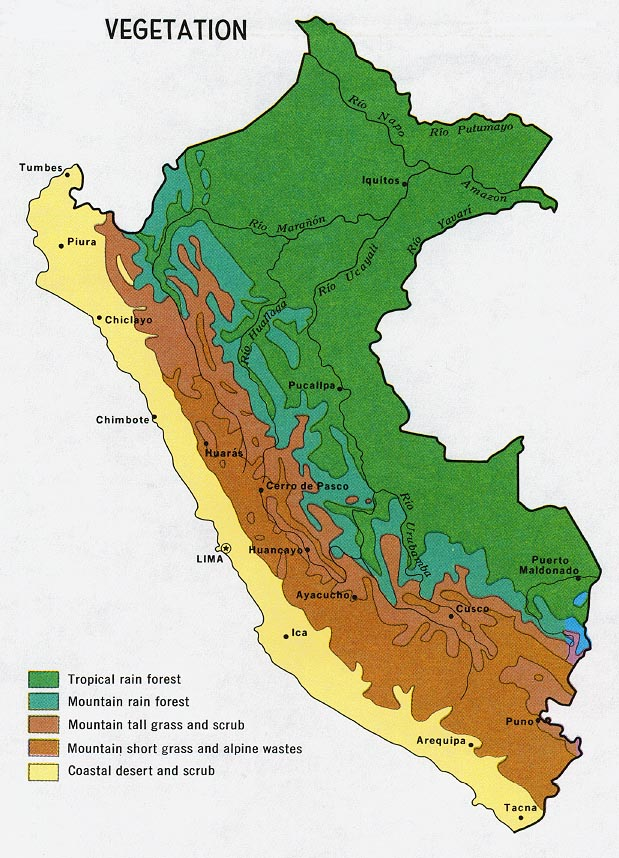
Vegetation of Peru

Peru is a country on the central western coast of South America facing the Pacific Ocean. It lies wholly in the Southern Hemisphere, its northernmost extreme reaching to 1.8 minutes of latitude or about 3.3 kilometres (2.1 mi) south of the equator. Peru shares land borders with Ecuador, Colombia, Brazil, Bolivia, and Chile, with its longest land border shared with Brazil.

== Natural Regions ==
Despite the great diversity of Peruvian territory, the Spanish divided it into three main regions for political rather than geographical reasons: the Coast, adjacent to the Pacific Ocean; the Highlands, located in the Andean mountains; and the Amazon Jungle. This division, despite its evident limitations, lasted until 1941, when the third General Assembly of the Pan American Institute of Geography and History approved the creation of eight natural regions, proposed by the geographer Javier Pulgar Vidal, to establish a physiographic map more adjusted to the biogeographical reality of the territory. Thus conceived, the Peruvian map comprises the following regions:

- La Chala or Coast: This region is found in the western lands, which are relatively flat and extend along the coast from sea level up to 500 meters in elevation. In this region, carob trees, palo verde, salt grass, mangroves, reeds, and wild canes grow along the rivers, and amancaes, wild tomatoes, mito, tara, and others grow on the hillsides. The coastal fauna includes sea lions, anchovies, and seabirds.
- La Yunga: A region of fertile valleys and ravines where lúcumo, cherimoya, guava, avocado, citrus fruits, and sugar cane are cultivated, along with picturesque river canyons. Between 500 and 2300 meters on the western slope, it is known as Maritime Yunga, and between 1000 and 2300 meters on the eastern slope, it is called Fluvial Yunga. Fluvial Yunga has a warm climate with seasonal rains, while a desert climate predominates in Maritime Yunga. The flora includes molle, white agave, pitahaya, and chuná, and the fauna includes birds such as the chaucato and taurigaray.
- Quechua: A region of temperate lands that extend across both Andean slopes between 2300 and 3500 meters in altitude. The landscape alternates between valleys and watersheds feeding into the same basin, with limited summer rains. The flora includes alder, lambran or rambash, gongapa, and arracacha, and maize, squash, passion fruit, papaya, wheat, and peach are cultivated. The fauna includes birds such as the gray thrush or chihuanco.
- Suni or Jalca: Lands with a cold and dry climate, with abundant summer rains, located between 3500 and 4100 meters, characterized by glacial valleys and slightly undulating bottoms. The landscape is covered by grasses and shrubs like taya-taya, quishuar, and cantuta (sacred flower of the Incas). Despite the climate, quinoa, cañigua, broad beans, olluco, and other crops thrive. The fauna includes the black thrush and guinea pig.
- La Puna: Covers the high plateaus and Andean cliffs between 4100 and 4800 meters, where a cold climate prevails. During the day, temperatures are positive, but they drop below 0 °C at night. The typical vegetation includes cacti and, in lakes and swampy areas, totoras. The most common crops are barley, potato, and maca. The characteristic fauna includes llama, alpaca, vicuña, guanaco, condor, huallata, flamingo, duck, and other aquatic birds.
- La Janca: Corresponds to the high frozen peaks, encompassing the domains of the condor, where the climate is glacial and vegetation is very scarce, reduced almost to yareta or yarita.
- La Rupa Rupa or High Jungle: Forested foothills located between 400 and 1000 meters on the eastern slope of the Andes, characterized by narrow, elongated valleys and river canyons or pongos. The warm, humid, and rainy climate favors a diverse tropical flora and fauna, including the tapir, peccary, and jaguar.
- Omagua, The Amazon or Low Jungle: A jungle plain that extends between 80 and 400 meters on the eastern Andean slope, through which the rivers of the Amazon basin flow, forming meanders, swamps, and lagoons. The flora includes trees like chonta, cedar, palms, shapaja, and shebo, and plants like orchids. The fauna includes capybara, giant armadillo, otter, and red deer, birds like toucan, hoatzin, jabiru, and macaw, as well as fish like paiche and other aquatic animals like the manatee and pipa toad.

== Statistics ==
Peru has a total land area of 1,285,220 km^{2} and a total water area of 5,000 km^{2}. In terms of maritime area, the country claims a continental shelf of 200 nmi (370.4 km; 230.2 mi), a territorial sea of 200 nmi (370.4 km; 230.2 mi) and an Exclusive economic zone of 857,000 km^{2} (331,000 mi^{2}).

Only 3% of Peru's land is arable, with 0.5% being suitable for permanent crops. Permanent pastureland accounts for 21% of Peru's land use, and forests and woodland accounting for 66% of the landscape. Approximately 9.5% (1993 est.) of Peruvian land is attributed to population centers, coastal regions, and other space.

Natural hazards that Peru experiences include earthquakes, tsunamis, flooding, landslides, and mild volcanic activity. The geographic positioning of Peru adjacent to the adjoining Nazca and South American tectonic plates - converging in the Peru–Chile Trench off the Pacific coast - serves as the catalyst to many of Peru's natural hazards.

Peru's environmental issues include deforestation (some the result of illegal logging); overgrazing of the slopes of the coast and sierra leading to soil erosion; desertification; air pollution in Lima; pollution of rivers and coastal waters from municipal and mining wastes.

Peru is a party to the following international environmental agreements:
Antarctic Treaty, Antarctic-Environmental Protocol, Biodiversity, Climate Change, Desertification, Endangered Species, Hazardous Wastes, Nuclear Test Ban, Ozone Layer Protection, Ship Pollution, Tropical Timber 83, Tropical Timber 94, Wetlands, Whaling. Furthermore, the country has signed, but not ratified, the Climate Change-Kyoto Protocol.

Peru shares control of Lake Titicaca, the world's highest navigable lake, with Bolivia.

== Urbanization ==
The most populated city in the country is Lima, the capital of Peru. Lima's metropolitan area has a population of over 10 million. The country's second and third largest cities, Callao and Arequipa, have around 1.3 and 1.2 million people, respectively. Peru's developed urban cities are found in coastal regions and to the north. There are 32.1 million people who live in Peru. The percentage of urbanization in Peru is 79.2%, and holds a yearly increase of 1.57%. Lima forms part of the largest cities in the Americas, and holds 31.7% of the country's population. The dense concentration of the population size of Peru is 25 people/km^{2} or 57/mi^{2}. Lima is a pull factor that draws millions of Peruvians from the suburbs to the capital. This urban inland migration is the result of sprawling around Lima. These sprawling places are known as “Pueblos Jóvenes”. The young towns and Lima make up the metropolitan area that extend 200 km (125 mi).

The urban growth brings issues to the metropolitan area and the environment. Lima is the most polluted city in Latin America. The overcrowding and growth of urbanization has caused Peruvians to use its green spaces for garbage disposal. This leads to the pollution of the river Rimac that supplies water to the metropolitan area.

The rise of urbanization forgets the historic sites, ruins or “huacas”, which are being replaced for buildings, roads, etc. Lima is home of 400 sites of 46,000 in the country, the country itself only preserves 1%.

Approximately 1.3 million Venezuelans have emigrated to Peru in search of residency. This international migration is caused by various social, environmental and economic crises in their home country. This push factor migration has brought to Peru sustenance problems like instability and food shortage.

== Climate ==
Peru map of Köppen climate classification zones

The combination of tropical latitude, mountain ranges, topography variations and two ocean currents (Humboldt and El Niño) gives Peru a large diversity of climates. Peru has a tropical climate with a wet and dry season.

=== Amazon Basin or Low Amazon ===
The eastern portions of Peru include the Amazon Basin or selva baja, a region that is larger in the north than in the south. Representing roughly 60% of Peru's national territory, this area includes the Amazon, Marañón, Huallaga and Ucayali Rivers.

Almost 60% of the country's area is located within this region, (700,000 km^{2} or 270,000 sq mi) giving Peru the fourth largest area of tropical forest in the world after Brazil, Congo and Indonesia.

=== Andean mountain ranges ===
The Andes shelter the very largest variety of climates in the country. The climate is semi-arid in the valleys and moist in higher elevations and towards the eastern flanks. Rainfall varies from 200 to 1,500 mm (7.9 to 59.1 in) per year. The monsoonal period starts in October and ends in April. The rainiest months are January through March where travel can be sometimes affected.

The western slopes are arid to semi-arid and receive rainfall only between January and March. Below the 2,500 m (8,202 ft) mark, the temperatures vary between 5 and 15 °C (41 and 59 °F) in the night versus 18 to 25 °C (64.4 to 77.0 °F) in the day.

Between 2,500 and 3,500 meters (8,202 and 11,483 ft), the temperatures vary from 0 to 12 °C (32.0 to 53.6 °F) in the night and from 15 to 25 °C (59 to 77 °F) during the day. At higher elevations from 3,500 to 4,500 meters (11,483 to 14,764 ft), the Puna ecoregion, the temperature varies from −10 to 8 °C (14.0 to 46.4 °F) during the night versus 15 °C (59 °F) during the day.

The northernmost regions of the Andes around Cajamarca and Piura regions have Páramo climates.

=== Coast ===
The Peruvian coast is a microclimatic region. The region is affected by the cold Humboldt Current, the El Niño Southern Oscillation, tropical latitude, and the Andes mountain range.

The central and southern coast consists mainly of a subtropical desert climate composed of sandy or rocky shores and inland cutting valleys. Days alternate between overcast skies with occasional fog in the winter and sunny skies with occasional haze in the summer, with the only precipitation being an occasional light-to-moderate drizzle that is known locally as garúa. These regions are usually characterized by mildly cold lows (14 °C or 57.2 °F) and also mild highs (29 °C or 84 °F). Temperatures rarely fall below 12 °C (53.6 °F) and do not go over 29 °C (84 °F). An exception is the southern coast, where it does get a bit warmer and drier for most of the year during daytime, and where it can also get much colder during winter nights (8 to 9 °C or 46.4 to 48.2 °F).

The northern coast, on the contrary, has a curious tropical-dry climate, generally referred to as tropical savanna. This region is a lot warmer and can be unbearable during summer months, where rainfall is also present. The region differs from the southern coast by the presence of shrubs, equatorial dry forests (Tumbes–Piura dry forests ecoregion), mangrove forests, tropical valleys near rivers such as the Chira and the Tumbes. The average temperature is 25 °C (77 °F).

==== Central and southern coast ====
The central and southern coast have a subtropical desert climate, despite this region being located in the tropics. The Humboldt Current, serving as one cause of climatic differentiation, is 7 to 8 °C (13 to 14 °F) colder than normal tropical seas at 14 to 19 °C (57 to 66 °F), thus preventing high tropical temperatures from appearing. Additionally, due to the height of the Andes cordillera, there is no passage of hot clouds from the Amazon to the coast, the climate is cooler than that of similar tropical latitudes. This can create a great deal of humidity and fog during winter months.

Moreover, the Andes mountains are very close to the coast, a geographic factor that prevents cumulus or cumulonimbus clouds from appearing. Therefore, a shade effect is created, causing very low annual rainfall in this region.

Rainfall averages 5 mm (0.2 in) per year near the Chilean border to 200 mm (7.9 in) per year on the northern coast and nearer the Andes.

The central coast is composed of regions including La Libertad, Ancash and Lima, which have a spring-like climate for most of the year. Foggy and sunny days intermingle around the humid sand dunes during most of the year.

Most summers (February–April) have pleasant temperatures ranging from 19 to 21 °C (66 to 70 °F) during the night to about 28 to 29 °C (82 to 84 °F) during the daytime. Winters (August–October) are very humid, and range from 12 to 15 °C (54 to 59 °F) during the nights to around the 17 to 18 °C (63 to 64 °F) during the day. The spring (November–January) and autumn (May–July) months have a pleasant climate that ranges from 23 °C (73 °F) during the day to around 17 °C (63 °F) during the night. Moving inland into the Yunga valleys, the climate tends to be ~3 °C (5.4 °F) drier and warmer during any given month.

The southern coast, composed of the Ica, Arequipa, Moquegua and Tacna regions, has a drier and warmer climate during the day for all seasons, although colder in winter. There are regions famous for their sand dunes and impressive deserts that are, in part, caused by the drier and hotter climate. Temperatures in this region can reach up to 36 °C (97 °F) in the Nazca region while inland regions can fall to 8 or 9 °C (46 or 48 °F) during the winter months. During the day, temperatures rarely go below the 22 or 23 °C (72 or 73 °F) for all months of the year. This purports the idea that the southern coast has a more desert-like climate, although daily temperature variations exist as they do in other regions within tropical latitudes. Clear skies are often present in desert areas and, although less common, near the coastal cliffs as well, which are home to a variety of fish and marine mammals.

==== Northern coast ====
The northern coast consists of the eastern region of Lambayeque, the Piura Region and the Tumbes Region. They are characterized by having different climate and geography from the rest of the coast. Right between the 3-hour drive on the Sechura Desert, which is located north of the Lambayeque Region and south of the Piura Region, is the evidence of climate change from the common subtropical desert found on the south to visible tropicalization effects of the tropical dry climate or tropical savanna. Examples of this are the tropical dry forests that begin to appear. They are composed of shrubs, thorny trees, carob trees, faique trees, guayacan trees, hualtaco trees, palo santo trees, ceibo trees and on the coast mangrove forests. It is also a biodiverse area where typical wildlife can be observed such as crocodiles, reptiles, iguanas, boas, pava aliblanca, anteater, bear, sloth (bearh) and many more.

This climatic change is caused by the presence of the warm El Niño Current during the summer months (December to April), the eventual El Niño Phenomenon and the passing of Amazon Jungles clouds due to mountain openings and lower altitudes of the Andes Chain. These are the causes for a climate change in a short two- or three-hour trajectory that is visible between the Lambayeque Region and the Sechura Province, where not only geography changes but a temperature rise of 6 °C (10.8 °F) or more depending on the month. It is directly off the shores of the Sechura Region where the cold Humboldt current and warm El Niño current meet, at about 5° to 6° south of the equator. From this point, warm temperatures are most common, and there are no true winters. Average temperatures range between 24.5–27 °C (76.1–80.6 °F).

Summer (December through March) is more humid and very hot, with average temperatures that vary from 25 °C (77 °F) during the night to around 34 °C (93.2 °F) during the day, although north of Lambayeque it can reach the 40 °C (104 °F). Winters (June–September) are cooler during the nights; around 16 °C (60.8 °F) during the night, to around 27 °C (80.6 °F) during the daytime.

There are protected areas in Tumbes and Piura such as the Coto de Caza El Angolo and the Cerros de Amotape National Park, with tropical dry forests that extend to the south of Ecuador. The eastern areas of Lambayeque also have tropical dry forests, where the Chaparrí Private Conservation Area is located in Chongoyape. These forests have the particularity of connecting with the Amazon basin through the Marañón pass (an area where there are also tropical dry forests).

Mangrove forests are located in four specific areas from Sechura to Tumbes. In these regions, the mangrove forests are at the ending strips of the Piura River in the Sechura Province (the southernmost mangroves in the Pacific Ocean). To the north, the ending strips of the Chira River, Tumbes River, and Zarumilla River also have mangrove forests that flow into the ocean.

Terrain: western coastal plain (costa), high and rugged Andes in center (sierra), eastern lowland jungle of Amazon Basin (selva).

Natural resources: copper, silver, gold, petroleum, timber, fish, iron ore, coal, phosphate, potash, hydropower.

== Extreme points ==
This is a list of the extreme points of Peru, the points that are farther north, south, east or west than any other location.

- Northernmost point: Putumayo River (00°02′21.42096″S 75°11′33.909″W) in the Teniente Manuel Clavero District, Putumayo Province, Loreto Region
- Southernmost point: Pacific shore (18°21′00.41832″S 70°22′34.7538″W) in the La Yarada-Los Palos District, Tacna Province, Tacna Region
- Westernmost point: either Punta Pariñas (04°40′45″S 81°19′35″W) in the La Brea District, Talara Province, Piura Region or Pacific shore (1.27 kilometers (1 mi) south of Punta Pariñas) (04°40′56.6238″S 81°19′41.64924″W) in the La Brea District, Talara Province, Piura Region
- Easternmost point: Mouth of the Heath River (12°30′09.20916″S 68°39′11.07468″W) in the Tambopata District, Tambopata Province, Madre de Dios Region

== Agriculture ==
Peru's agricultural lands make up 18.5% of Peru's total surface area, a substantially lower percentage compared to its neighbors who average at around 22% agricultural land. Common crops include, but are not limited to root vegetables like potatoes and cassava; peppers including chilies and paprika; vegetables like asparagus, tomatoes; quinoa; kiwicha; and fruits like mangoes, passion fruit, citrus, and bananas. Levels of undernourished citizens and children who suffer from undernourishment has dramatically decreased from just under six million to just over two million between 2000 and 2017, while food availability has increased from an energy percentage of 105 to 117 between 2000 and 2017.

=== Environmental degradation ===
As food production in Peru increases, farmers saturate the soil with nutrients with nitrogen and phosphorus bases. Oversaturation of nutrients leads to eutrophication in nearby water bodies, resulting in dead zones. Carbon emissions due to manufacturing and food processing leads to reduced air quality which contributes to the global warming that increases severity of natural disasters and acidifies the ocean, leading to mass bleaching in coral reefs, which in turn tends to destroy oceanic ecosystems.

== Bibliography ==
- Aduni Institute (2003). Compendio académico de Geografía [Academic Compendium of Geography] (in Spanish). Lumbreras.
- Baca Zuta, Davis (2019). Las regiones geográficas del Perú, clasificación y teorías diversas [The Geographical Regions of Peru: Classification and Diverse Theories] (in Spanish).
- Benavides Estrada, Juan (1999). Geografía del Perú 2do año de Secuandaria [Geography of Peru for 2nd Grade of Secondary School] (in Spanish). Escuela Nueva.
- Pulgar Vidal, Javier (1987). Geografía del Perú [Geography of Peru (9th ed.)] (in Spanish). PEISA. ISBN 84-599-6883-9.
- National Geographic Institute (1989). Atlas del Perú [Atlas of Peru] (in Spanish).
