= Mancora =

Mancora may refer to:

- Máncora, a beach town in Peru
- Máncora District in Peru
- Mancora (2008), a Peruvian film
