= Calle canal =

Street type in South America

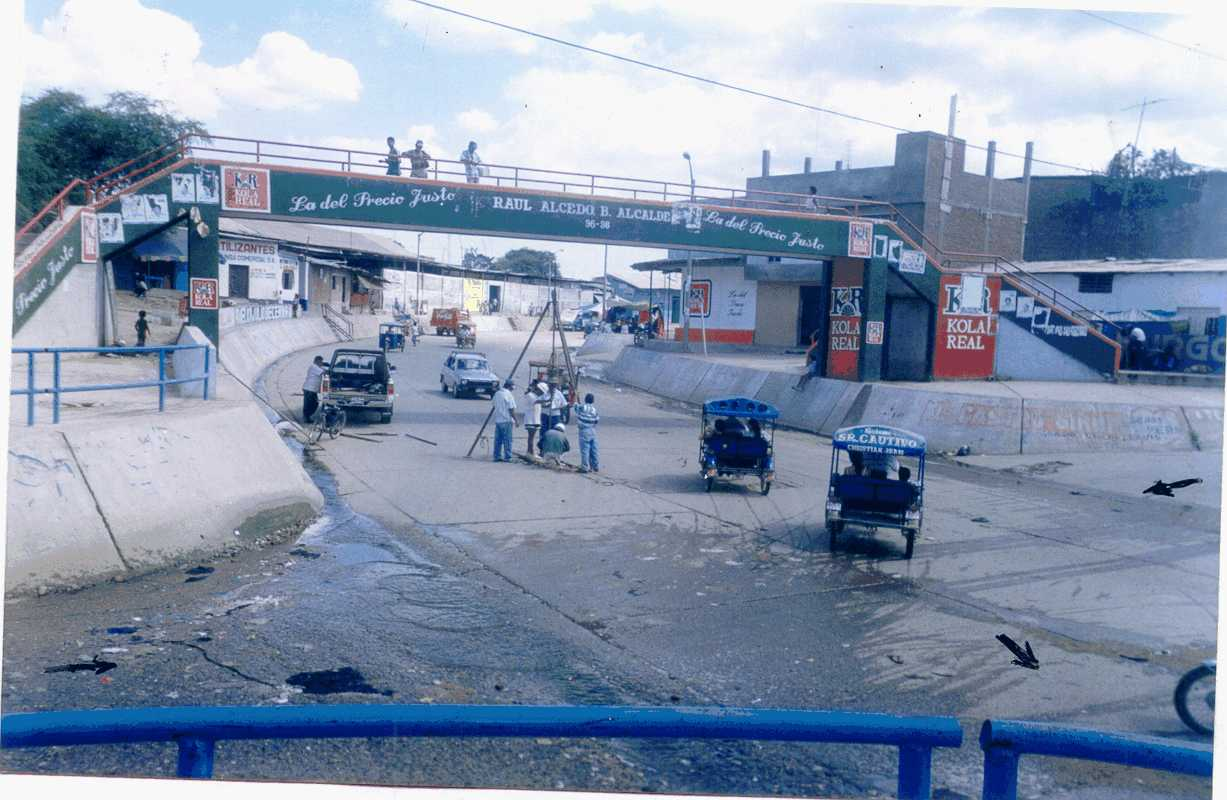
The Canal Vía of Sullana being used by motorists.

A calle canal or vía canal is a street type in northern Peru and Ecuador located in the urban area of cities expressly designed to function exceptionally and for short periods (i.e. few hours) as canals to evacuate water and mud from intense and infrequent rains.

This type of solution, used in the northern Peruvian cities of Piura, Catacaos, Los Órganos and Sullana, from the period of reconstruction of the damaged infrastructures during the El Niño phenomenon of the years 1997–1998, can be used whenever, due to the topographic conditions, as long as a free flow of rain outside of the city via a slope is guaranteed. Otherwise, water can accumulate and pool in certain parts.

In Sullana, the Canal Vía is a known street of this type. Mismanagement of the canal led to flooding of several parts and the establishment of unlicensed businesses set up by street merchants.
