= List of lighthouses in Peru =

This is a list of lighthouses in Peru. It includes those maritime lighthouses that are located on the islands and the Pacific coastline of the country, which are named landfall lights, or have a range of at least fifteen nautical miles. Peru also has a number of lighthouses on the western side of Lake Titicaca, these are listed separately.

== Maritime lighthouses ==
Name	Location (coordinates)	Year built	Tower height (in metres)	Focal height (in metres)	Range (in nautical miles)	Admiralty no.
Ancon Lighthouse	Ancón District	1986	18	172	17	G2063.60
Bayovar Lighthouse	Port of Bayóvar	1977	18	184	19	G2127
Boca del Rio Lighthouse	Tacna	1982	12	51	19	G2000.40
Cabo Blanco Lighthouse	Cabo Blanco	1978	12	39	16	G2153
Caleta Planchada Lighthouse	Camaná province	1976	10	96	16	G2016
Contralmirante Villar Lighthouse	Zorritos	1975	18	64	19	G2180
Eten Lighthouse		1975	10	16	16	G2117
Gran Almirante Grau Lighthouse	San Lorenzo Island	1973	16	309	20	G2049
Infiernillos Lighthouse		1961	8	40	15	G2030
Isla Chilca Lighthouse		1974	10	110	19	G2043
Isla Chincha Lighthouse		1975	18	93	17	G2033.5
Isla Foca Lighthouse		1931	5	60	15	G2132
Isla Mazorca Lighthouse		1928	8	127	15	G2068
Islas Lobos De Afuera Lighthouse		1975	18	86	27	G2112
Isla San Gallán Lighthouse	San Gallan Island			385	10	G2033
La Marina Lighthouse	Miraflores	1973	22	108	18	G2046
La Punta de Callao Lighthouse		1973	41	41	19	G2059
Mancora Lighthouse		1978	12	57	18	G2158
Morro Carretas Lighthouse	Salaverry District	1974	17	126	21	G2089
Paita Lighthouse		1974	19	72	18	G2132.8
Punta Atico Lighthouse	Arequipa Department	1929	18	101	17	G2018
Punta Cabeza Lagarto Lighthouse		1981	7	74	16	G2076
Punta Coles Lighthouse		1973	15	36	19	G2002
Punta Huacho Lighthouse		1973	10	81	19	G2071
Punta Islay Lighthouse	Islay District	1930	13	65	19	G2010
Punta Pacasmayo Lighthouse		1967	11	24	15	G2106
Punta Pariñas Lighthouse	Pariñas District	1974	18	73	15	G2138
Punta San Juan Lighthouse		1974	12	95	17	G2028
Punta Talara Lighthouse	Pariñas District	1942	8	61	19	G2140
Punta Thomas Lighthouse		1995	18	61	17	G2074
Quilca Lighthouse		1997	6	96	15	G2014
San Nicolas Lighthouse		1959	18	46	26	G2029.40

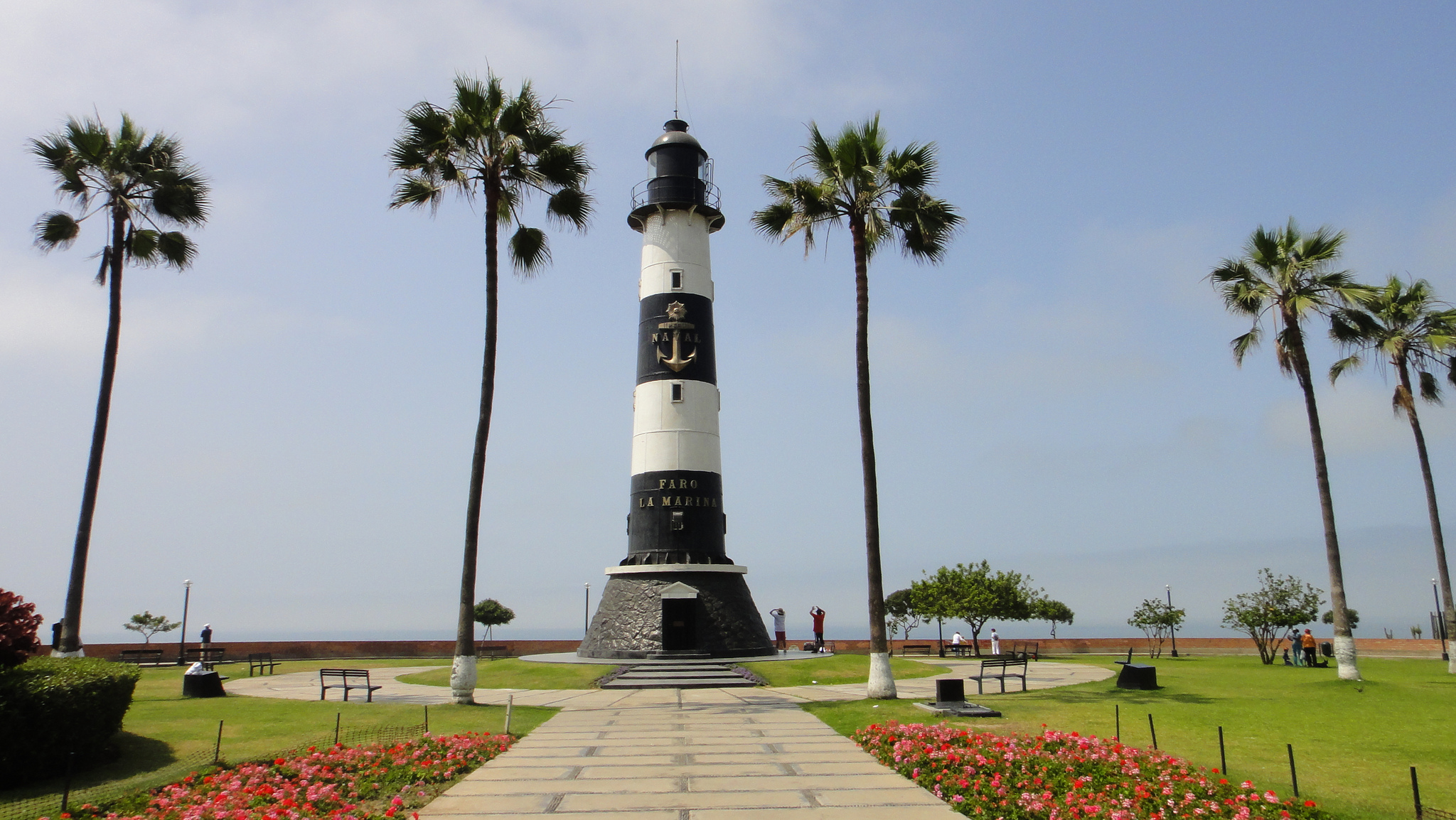
La Marina Lighthouse in Miraflores

== Lake Titicaca lights ==
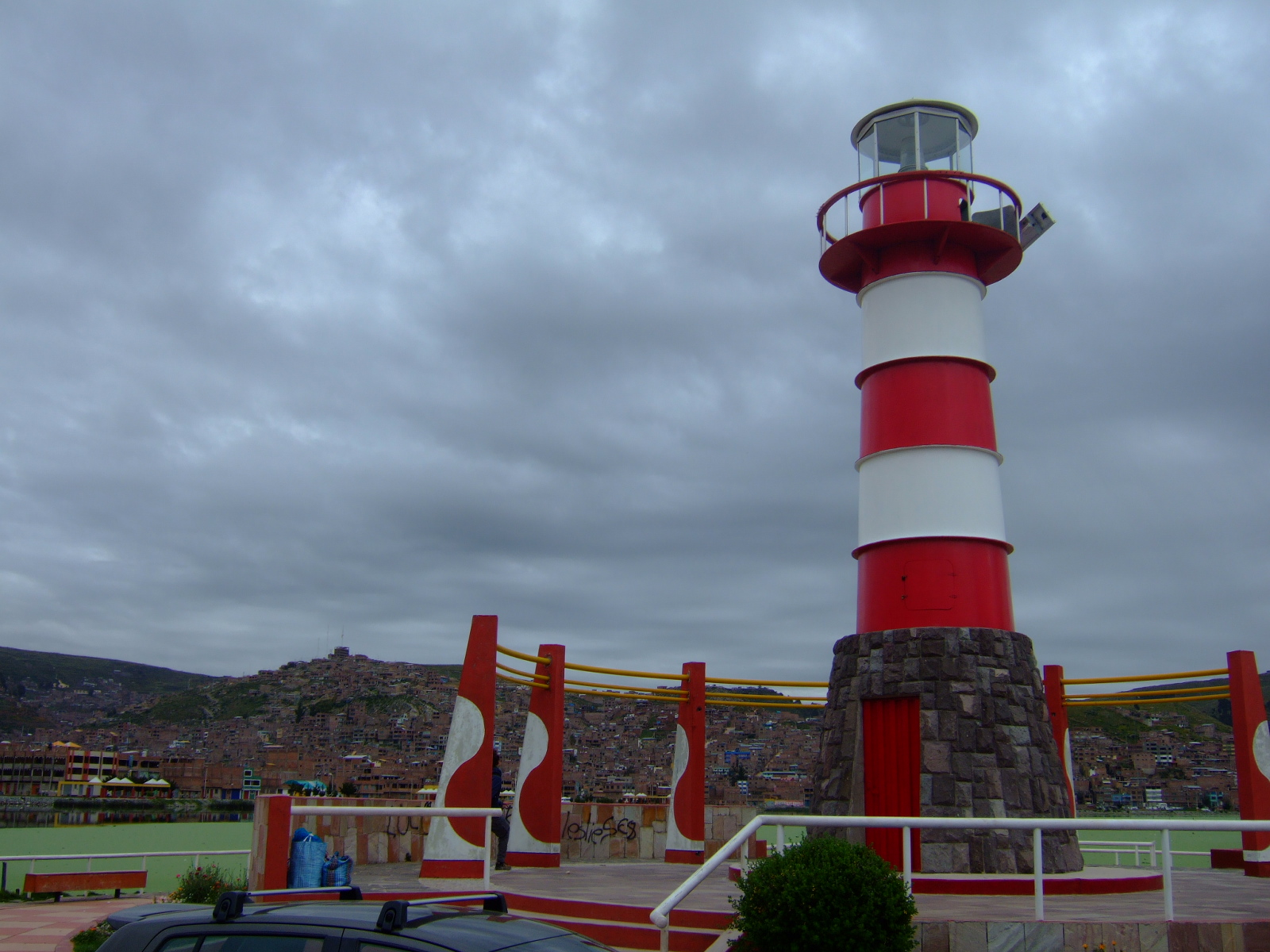
Puno Lighthouse on the shore of Lake Titicaca

There are six Peruvian lighthouses that aid navigation on the lake.

Name	Location	Coordinates
Isla Anapia Lighthouse	Anapia Island	
Isla Suana Lighthouse	Suana Island	
Punta Chino Lighthouse	Tiquillaca District	
Punta Pomata Lighthouse	Pomata District	
Puno Lighthouse	Puno	
Taquile Island Lighthouse	Taquile Island	

== See also ==
- Lists of lighthouses and lightvessels
