= Punta Arenas (disambiguation) =

Punta Arenas is a city in the far south of Chile.

Punta Arenas may also refer to:

- Punta Arenas, Peru
- Playa Punta Arenas, a beach on Margarita Island, Venezuela
- Point Arena, California, United States, formerly Punta Arenas
- Punta Arenas, a sand spit partially sheltering the waterfront of Bahía de los Ángeles in Mexico

== See also ==
- Puntarenas, a city in Costa Rica
