= Vladimir Lysenko =

Russian academic and world traveler (born 1955)

Vladimir Ivanovich Lysenko
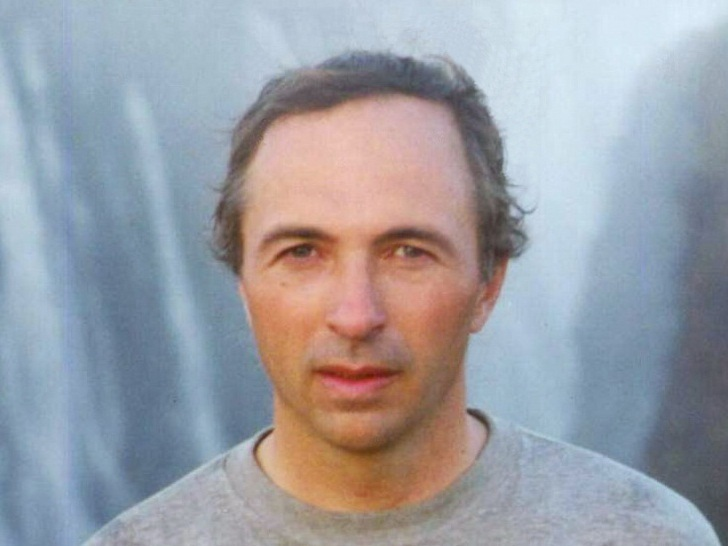
- Born: January 1, 1955 (age 71); Kharkov, Ukrainian SSR, Soviet Union (now Kharkiv, Ukraine)
- Occupation: Scientist
- Years active: 1990–present
- Employer(s): Institute of Mechanics, Russian Academy of Sciences
- Known for: World travel
- Notable work: Stability and Transition of High-Speed Boundary Layers and Wakes
- Title: President, Union of Russian Around-the-World Travellers; Doctor of Philosophy, Fluid Mechanics
- Board member of: Himalayan Club of Russian Rafters & Kayakers (Chairman)

Vladimir Ivanovich Lysenko (Russian: Владимир Лысенко; born 1 January 1955) is a Russian academic and world traveler. He set several Guinness World Records related to high-altitude river rafting.

== Biography ==
Lysenko was born in Kharkov, USSR on 1 January 1955 in the family of pilot Ivan Lysenko and engineer-designer Galina Lysenko (Korotkova). He had graduated from the Kharkov Aviation University (aircraft construction faculty) with honors and the postgraduate course of the Siberian Branch of the Russian Academy of Sciences (in the specialty "mechanics of fluid, gas and plasma").

Vladimir has three children: Victor (birthday 27.10.80), after graduating from Novosibirsk State University (Faculty of Economics) who moved from Novosibirsk to Krasnodar; Svetlana (28.10.83), after graduating from the Novosibirsk State University (Faculty of Economics) moved to Moscow, now lives in the Netherlands in Zuid-Scharwoude; and Slaviya (8.10.16).

== Education ==
Lysenko holds a Doctorate of Philosophy (Ph.D.) in fluid mechanics. He is a leading fellow at the Institute of Mechanics of the Russian Academy of Sciences in Novosibirsk. He authored the book Stability and Transition of High-Speed Boundary Layers and Wakes, as well as over 200 scientific papers.

== Traveling ==
=== Rafting ===
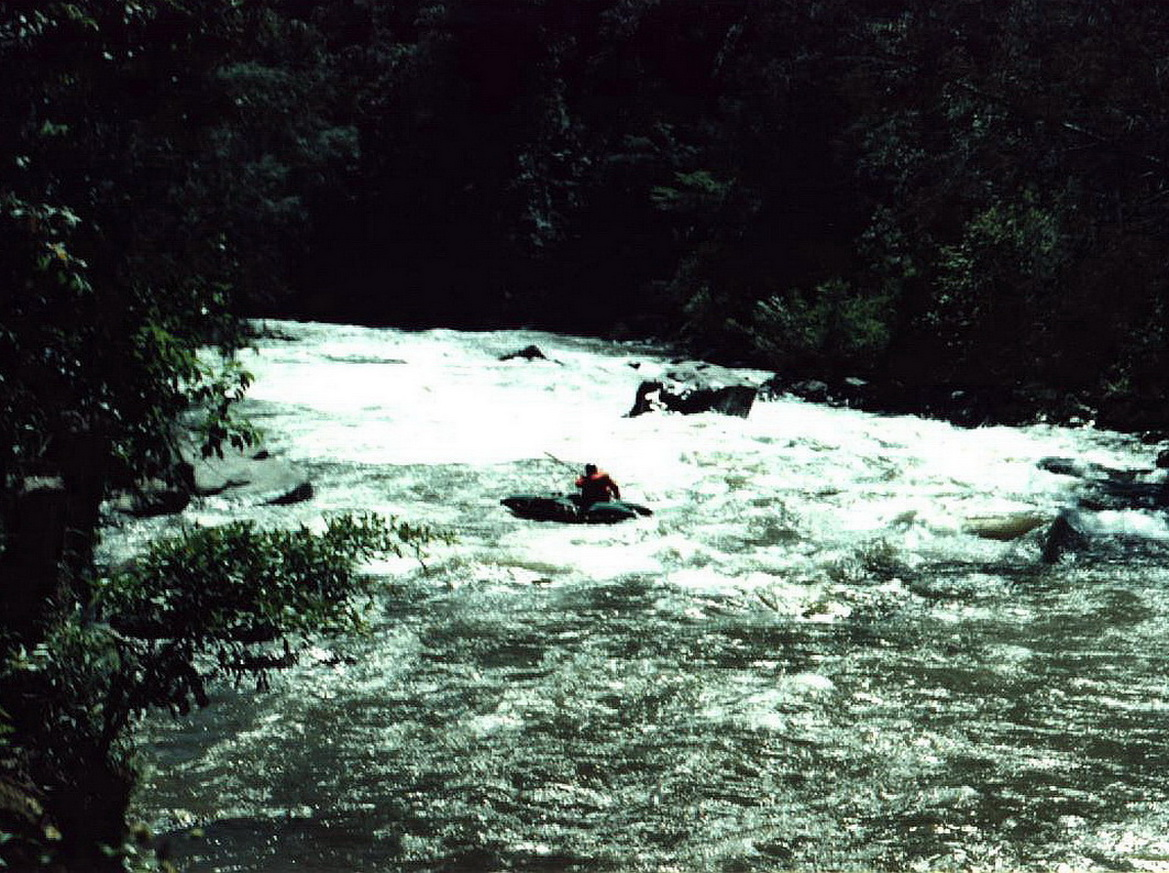
Vladimir on Kemabu River, New Guinea

Between 1991 and 1992, Lysenko became the first man to raft on rivers flowing down all of the world's eight-thousanders—the 14 mountains with peaks higher than 8,000 meters (26,000 ft) above sea level.

In 1996, Lysenko became the first man to raft down the highest peak of every continent (except the Antarctic), as well as the highest peak of Oceania.

While rafting down Mount Everest in Nepal in April and May 1991, Lysenko set the Guinness World Record for the greatest altitude difference travelled in a rafting trip: a descent of 4,500 meters (14,800 ft) from Dughla on the Khumbu Glacier (4,600 metres or 15,100 feet above sea level) to Chatara (100 metres or 330 feet above sea level). In September 1996, he set the Guinness World Record for high-altitude rafting with a 5,600 meters (18,400 ft) start on the Eastern Rong Chu River on Mount Everest; the previous record of 5,334 meters (17,500 ft) had been set in September 1976 by the Mike-Jones team of England.

Vladimir rafted also on mountain sources of Amazon River and the Nile, kayaked on Yukon River. He rafted in 100 countries (including Nepal, China, Pakistan, India, Afghanistan, etc.).

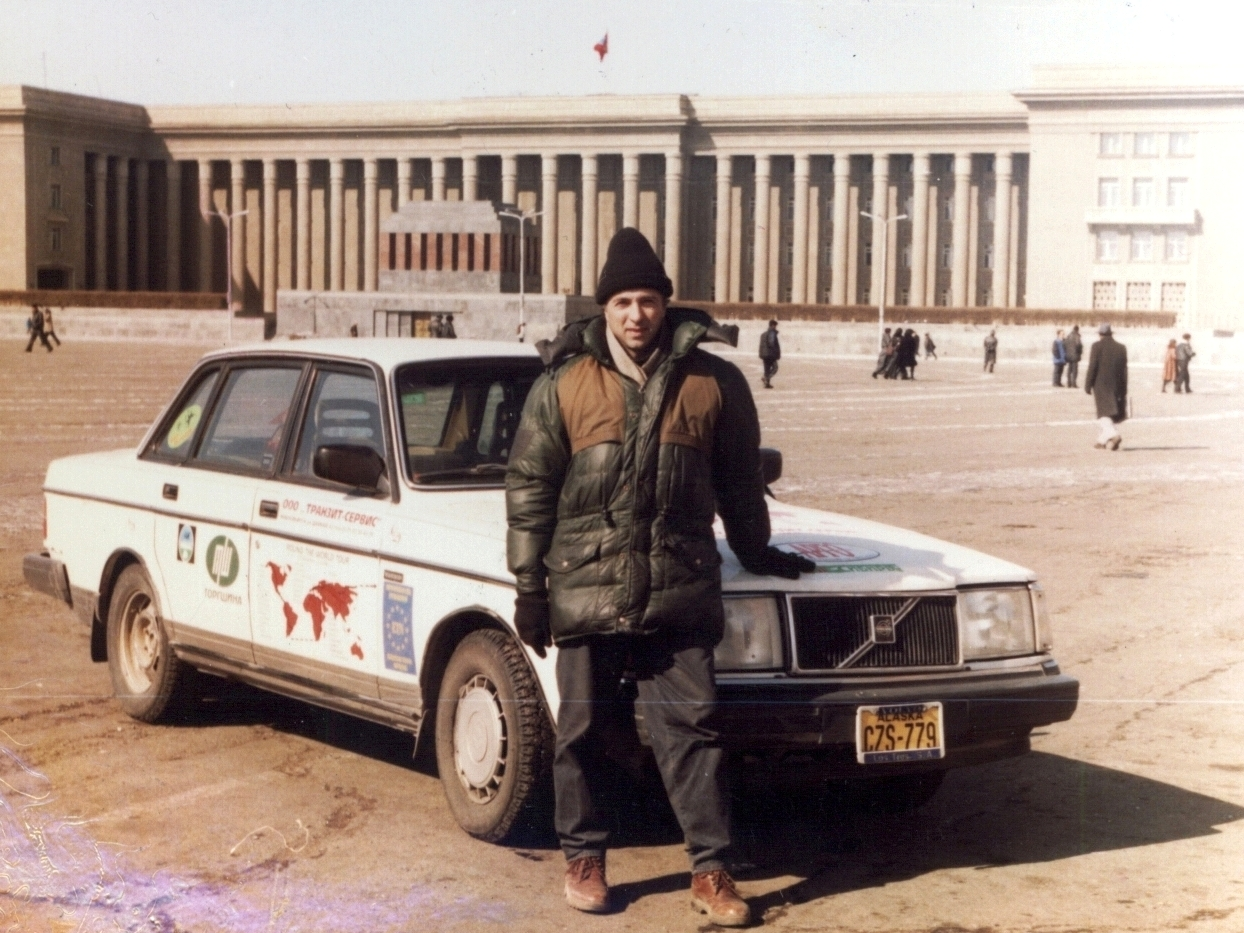
Vladimir Lysenko in Ulan Bator; Mongolia

=== Circumnavigation in a car ===
Between September 1997 and 2002, Lysenko crossed 62 countries by car. He crossed each continent (other than Antarctica) twice, traveling between the most distant points of each continent in both latitude and longitude. He crossed the Americas from Prudhoe Bay, Alaska to Tierra del Fuego in Argentina; from Punta Pariñas, Peru to Cape Cabo Branko, Brazil; and from Anchor Bay, Alaska to St. John's, Newfoundland and Labrador, Canada. His routes across Africa took him from Cape Agulhas, South Africa to Ras-Angela Cape, Tunisia; and from Somali to Dakar. Crossing Europe and Asia, he travelled from Cabo da Roca, Portugal to Galimiy and Magadan in Russia; and from Tanjung Piai in Peninsular Malaysia to North Cape, Norway. Australia was crossed from Cape Byron to Steep Point and from Cape York Peninsula to South Point. These travels totaled 160,000 kilometers (99,000 mi). For the trip departing from Anchorage, the limited finances of Lysenko's team lead them to buy a used Volvo 240 with 300,000 miles (480,000 km) on the odometer for US$2,500.

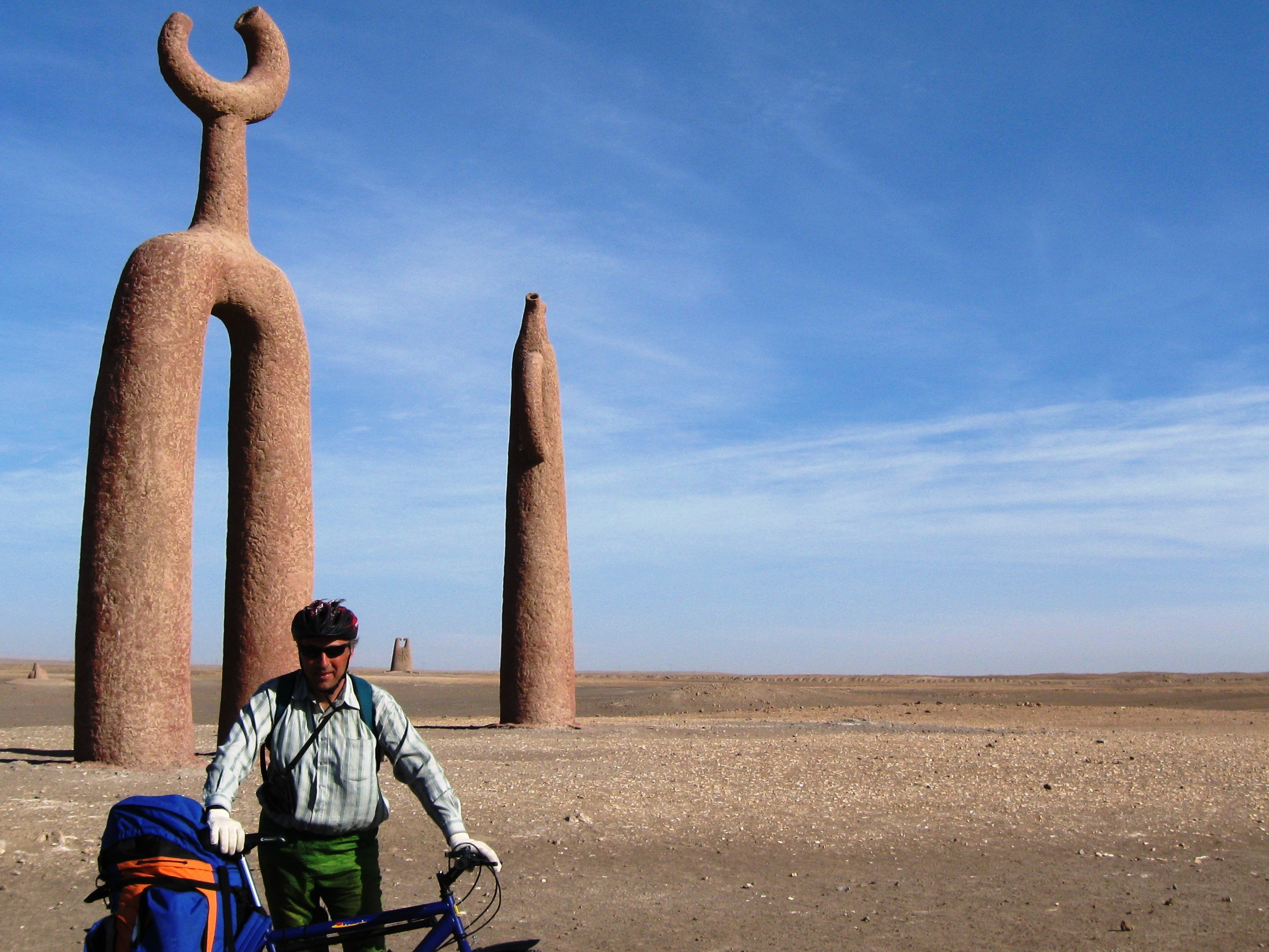
V.Lysenko in Deidades Tutelares, Chile

=== Circumnavigation on a bicycle ===
The start was in Vladivostok, Russia in 2006. Lysenko has ridden 41,800 kilometers (26,000 mi) on a bicycle. He has cycled via 29 countries - Russia, Mongolia, Kazakhstan, Ukraine, Slovakia, Austria, Germany, Liechtenstein, Switzerland, Italy, France, Spain, Morocco (and Western Sahara), São Tomé and Príncipe, Argentina, Chile, Peru, Ecuador, El Salvador, Guatemala, Belize, Mexico, the United States, Kiribati, Nauru, New Zealand, Australia, Indonesia, North Korea.

=== The path of Gold Rush ===
In 2003, Lysenko duplicated the path of the Klondike Gold Rush of 1897–1898, travelling by foot and kayak.

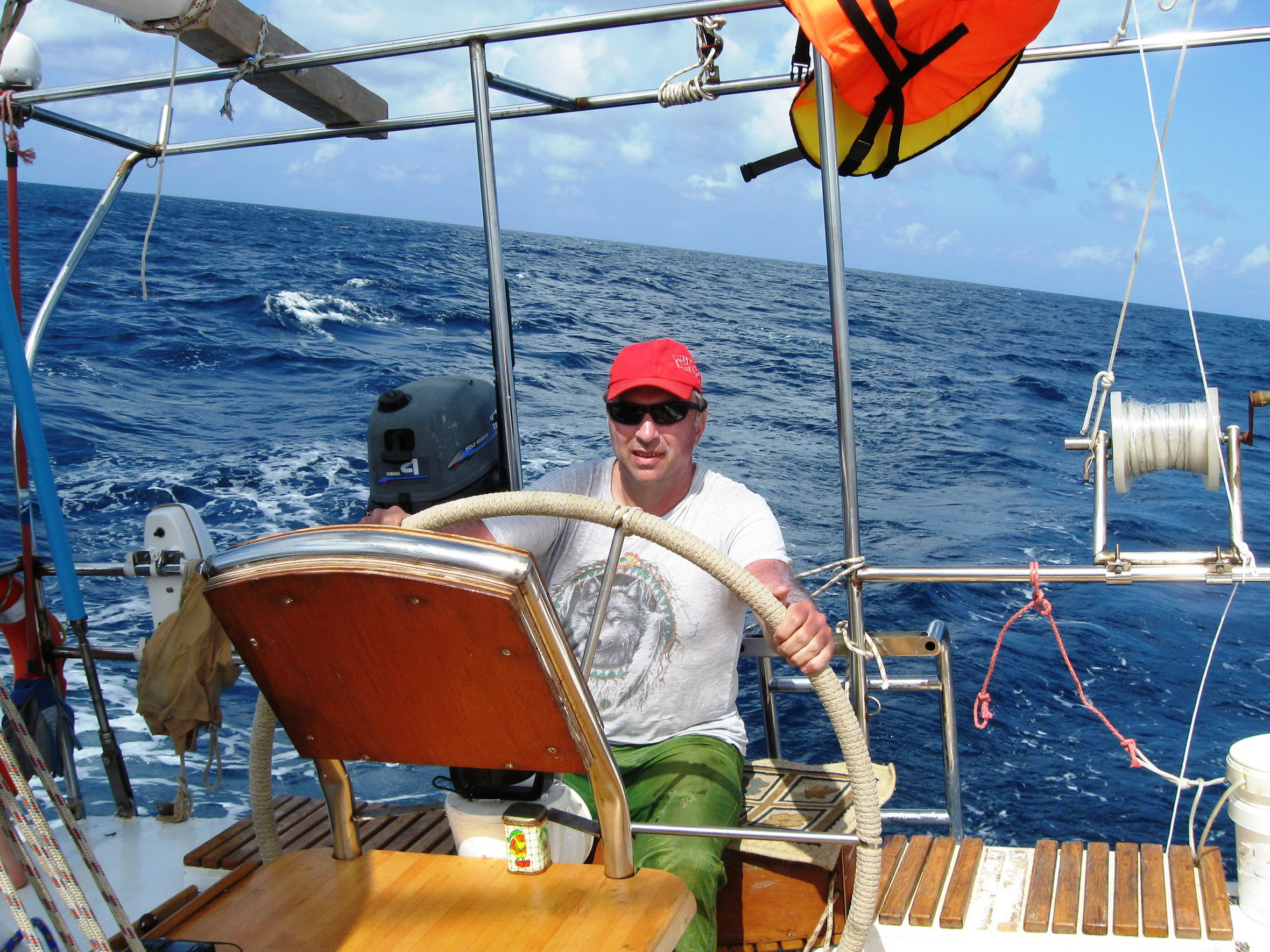
V.Lysenko in a yacht in Indian Ocean

=== Circumnavigation along the equator ===
Lysenko had circumnavigated the globe from west to east, straying no more than two degrees of latitude from the Equator. Starting in Libreville (Gabon), Vladimir had successfully crossed (in a car, a motor boat, a yacht, a ship, a kayak, a bicycle, and by foot) Africa (from Libreville (Gabon) to Kiunga (Kenya) through Gabon, Republic of Congo, Democratic Republic of the Congo, Uganda and Kenya), Indian Ocean, Indonesia (from Padang to Biak), Pacific Ocean, South America (from Pedernales (Ecuador) to Macapa (Brazil) through Ecuador, Colombia and Brazil) and Atlantic Ocean with finish in Libreville in 2012.

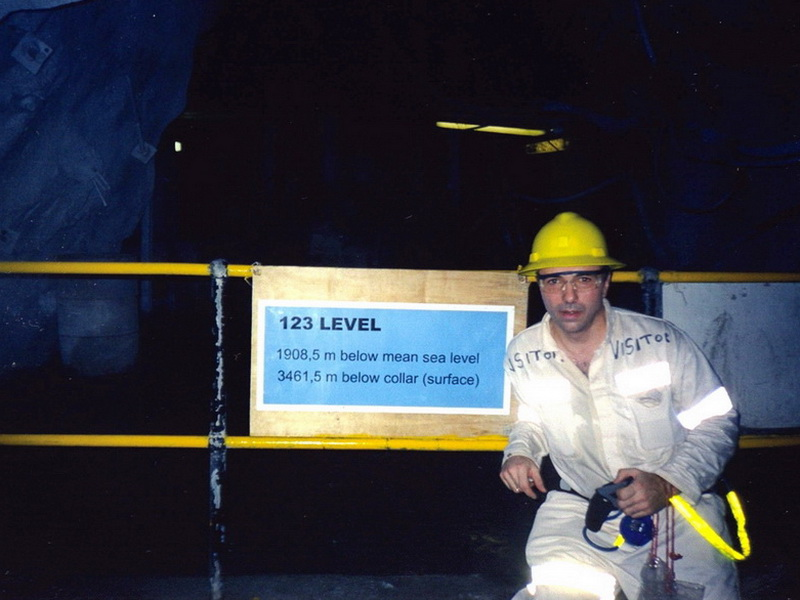
Lysenko at the depth of 3.5 km

=== Project "From Earth's Bowels to Stratosphere" ===
In his project titled "From Earth's bowels to stratosphere", Lysenko descended (in 2004) to the bottom of the world's deepest mine, the Mponeng Gold Mine in Carletonville, South Africa, a depth of 3.4615 kilometers (2.1509 mi) below ground. Then he had traveled in a car from Carletonville to Moscow, passing through South Africa, Namibia, Angola, the Congo, Zaire, Kenya, Ethiopia, Sudan, Egypt, Jordan, Syria, Lebanon, Turkey, Azerbaijan, and Russia. And then Lysenko made a series of lifting by various planes to the stratosphere (to the height of 11–16,5 km). Difference of altitudes on this route (from the mine bottom to the stratosphere) was 3.5 + 16.5 = 20 kilometers (12 mi), and difference of temperatures 58°+ |-56°| = 114°С.

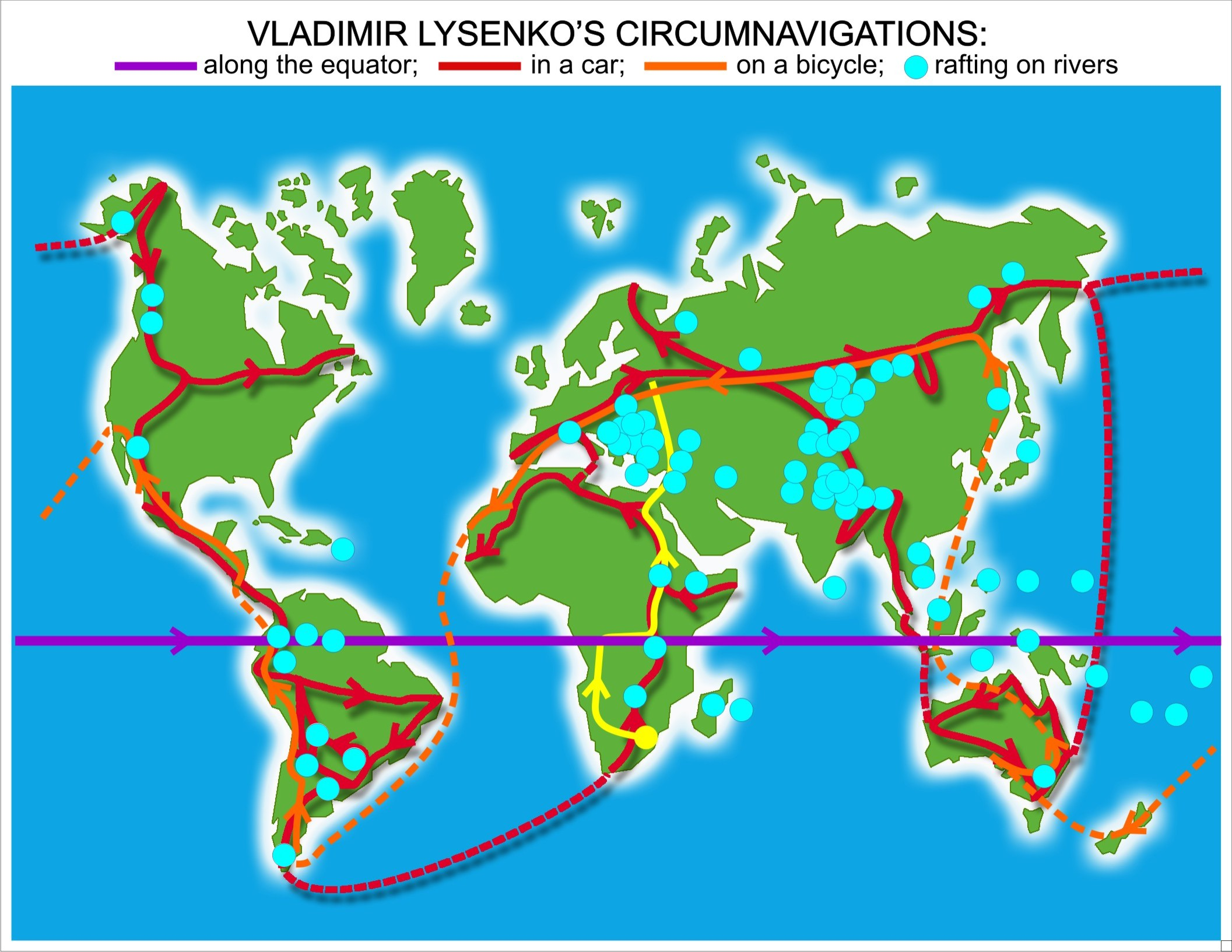
Routes of circumnavigations of Vladimir Lysenko

== Affiliations ==
Lysenko is the President of Union of Russian Around-the-World Travelers, and the Chairman of Himalayan Club of Russian Rafters & Kayakers.

== Bibliography ==
- Vladimir Lysenko. Rafting Down the Highest World Peaks (in Russian) 1997. Novosibirsk
- Vladimir Lysenko. Round-the-World Tour In a Car (in Russian) 2002. Novosibirsk
- V.I.Lysenko. Stability and Transition of High-Speed Boundary Layers and Wakes. (in Russian) 2006. Novosibirsk
- Vladimir Lysenko. Round-the-World Tour On a Bicycle (in Russian) 2014. Novosibirsk
- Vladimir Lysenko.Round-the-World Tour Along the Equator (in Russian) 2014. Novosibirsk
- Vladimir Lysenko. From the Earth Bowels to the Stratosphere (in Russian) 2014. Novosibirsk
- Vladimir Lysenko's travellings. (in Russian) 2016. Volgograd
- Vladimir Lysenko. Photosketches of 100 most interesting and various countries. (in Russian) 2017. Novosibirsk
- Modern Russian Travellers, Vol.2: Vladimir Lysenko, My travellings and adventures (in Russian). 2018. Novosibirsk
