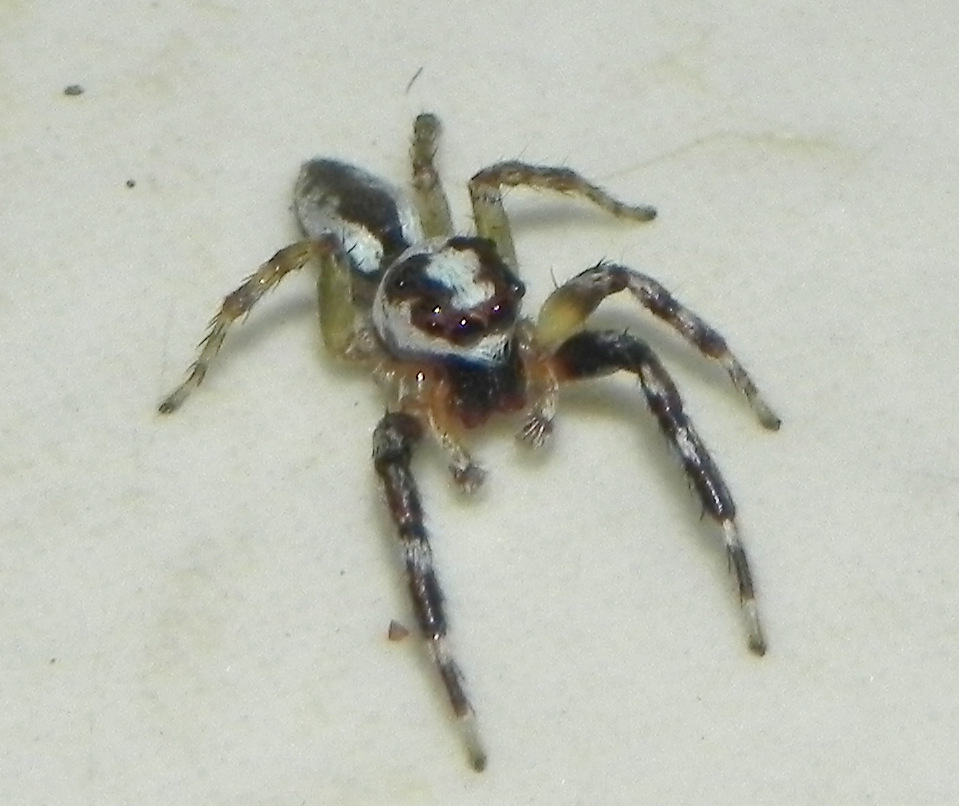
- Chira lucina

Scientific classification
- Kingdom: Animalia
- Phylum: Arthropoda
- Subphylum: Chelicerata
- Class: Arachnida
- Order: Araneae
- Infraorder: Araneomorphae
- Family: Salticidae
- Subfamily: Salticinae
- Genus: Chira; Peckham & Peckham, 1896

Type species
- C. trivittata (Taczanowski, 1871)

Species
- 14, see text

Synonyms
- Alcimonotus Simon, 1902; Crulsia Mello-Leitão, 1930; Goya Mello-Leitão, 1945; Ilarginus Mello-Leitão, 1939

= Chira (spider) =

Genus of spiders

Chira is a genus of jumping spiders that was first described by George Peckham & Elizabeth Peckham in 1896. It is currently named after Rio Chira, a river in Peru, but the Peckhams originally called the genus Shira, later emended by Eugène Simon.

Spiders in this genus are found in Central and South America.

== Species ==
As of October 2025, this genus includes fourteen species:

- Chira fagei Caporiacco, 1947 – Guyana
- Chira flavescens Caporiacco, 1947 – Guyana
- Chira gounellei (Simon, 1902) – Venezuela, Brazil, Paraguay, Argentina
- Chira guianensis (Taczanowski, 1871) – Trinidad, French Guiana, Peru, Brazil
- Chira hanagarthi Rubio, Perger, Baigorria, Metzner & Höfer, 2023 – Bolivia
- Chira ivyatenea Rubio, Perger, Baigorria, Metzner & Höfer, 2023 – Argentina
- Chira lanei Soares & Camargo, 1948 – Brazil
- Chira lucina Simon, 1902 – Guyana, Brazil, Paraguay
- Chira simoni Galiano, 1961 – Brazil, Paraguay
- Chira spinosa (Mello-Leitão, 1939) – Honduras, Panama, Bolivia, Brazil, Paraguay, Argentina
- Chira stolari Rubio, Perger, Baigorria, Metzner & Höfer, 2023 – Brazil
- Chira thysbe Simon, 1902 – Panama, Guyana, Brazil, Uruguay
- Chira trivittata (Taczanowski, 1871) – Guatemala, Panama, Guyana, Bolivia, Brazil (type species)
- Chira typica (Mello-Leitão, 1930) – Brazil
