= Lobitos District =

Coordinates: 4.4528°S 81.2777°W

Lobitos
- District
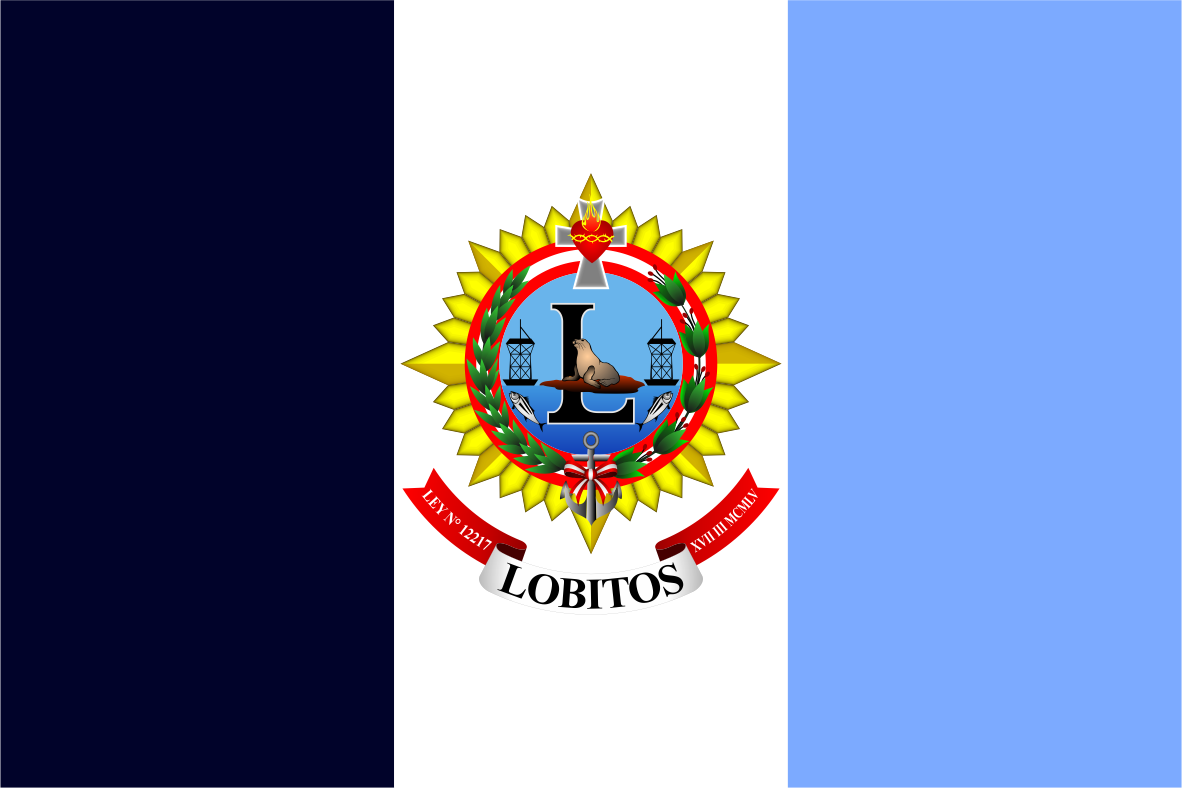
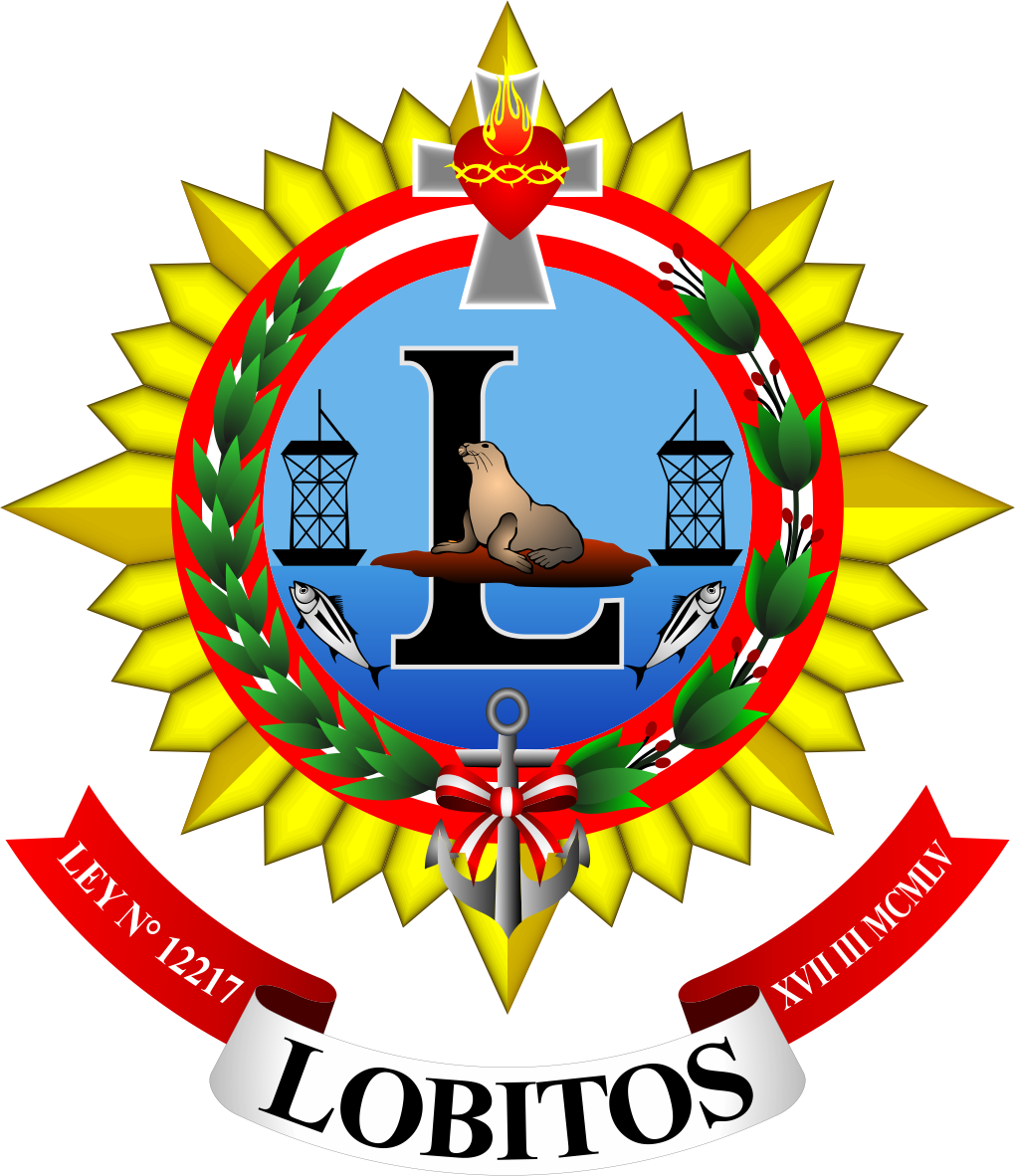
- Flag Coat of arms
- Interactive map of Lobitos
- Country: Peru
- Region: Piura
- Province: Talara
- Founded: March 17, 1955
- Capital: Lobitos

Government
  - Mayor: María Excelina Chapilliquén Ruiz

Area
  - Total: 233.01 km^{2} (89.97 sq mi)
- Elevation: 28 m (92 ft)

Population (2017)
  - Total: 1,312
  - Density: 5.631/km^{2} (14.58/sq mi)
- Time zone: UTC-5 (PET)
- UBIGEO: 200704

Lobitos District is one of six districts of the province Talara in Peru.
