= El Alto District =

Coordinates: 4.2679°S 81.2191°W

El Alto
- District
- Interactive map of El Alto
- Country: Peru
- Region: Piura
- Province: Talara
- Founded: March 17, 1955
- Capital: El Alto

Government
  - Mayor: Rosa Amelia Machuca Neyra

Area
  - Total: 491.33 km^{2} (189.70 sq mi)
- Elevation: 275 m (902 ft)

Population (2005 census)
  - Total: 6,536
  - Density: 13.30/km^{2} (34.45/sq mi)
- Time zone: UTC-5 (PET)
- UBIGEO: 200702

El Alto District is one of six districts of the province Talara in Peru.

== Climate ==
Climate data for El Alto, elevation 295 m (968 ft), (1991–2020)
Month	Jan	Feb	Mar	Apr	May	Jun	Jul	Aug	Sep	Oct	Nov	Dec	Year
Mean daily maximum °C (°F)	28.8 (83.8)	29.1 (84.4)	29.2 (84.6)	29.2 (84.6)	27.9 (82.2)	26.4 (79.5)	25.0 (77.0)	24.3 (75.7)	24.4 (75.9)	25.1 (77.2)	25.8 (78.4)	27.5 (81.5)	26.9 (80.4)
Mean daily minimum °C (°F)	20.7 (69.3)	21.9 (71.4)	21.8 (71.2)	21.5 (70.7)	19.7 (67.5)	17.7 (63.9)	16.5 (61.7)	15.9 (60.6)	15.7 (60.3)	16.4 (61.5)	16.9 (62.4)	18.8 (65.8)	18.6 (65.5)
Average precipitation mm (inches)	4.6 (0.18)	18.1 (0.71)	28.1 (1.11)	6.2 (0.24)	1.1 (0.04)	0.2 (0.01)	0.7 (0.03)	0.0 (0.0)	0.1 (0.00)	0.1 (0.00)	0.3 (0.01)	0.4 (0.02)	59.9 (2.35)
Source: National Meteorology and Hydrology Service of Peru
