= Punta Pariñas =

Westernmost point in mainland South America

Punta Pariñas Punta Balcones
- Cape
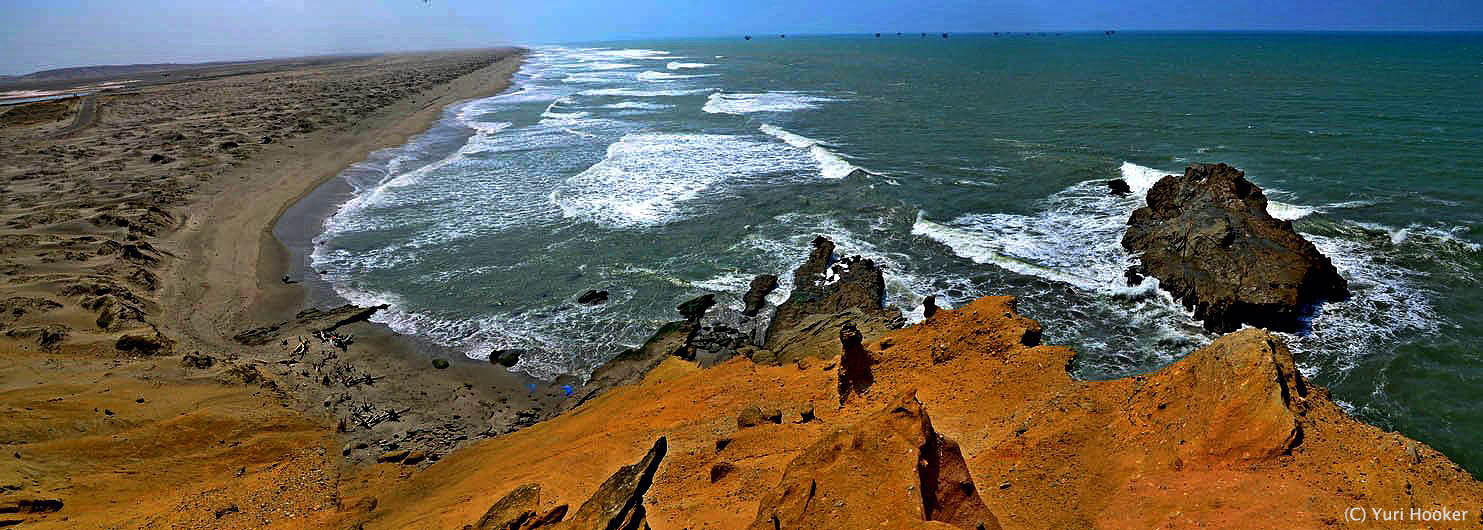
- Punta Balcones in 2012

- Location within Peru
- Coordinates: 4°40′45″S 81°19′35″W
- Location: La Brea District, Talara Province, Piura Region, Peru
- Water bodies: Pacific Ocean

Punta Pariñas, also known as Punta Balcones, is in the La Brea District, Talara Province, Piura Region, Peru. It is the westernmost point in mainland South America, located at 04°40′45″S 81°19′35″W.

An active lighthouse is located in Punta Pariñas. There is a popular beach just south of the cape, and visitors can climb the headland to see South American sea lions below.

== See also ==
- Extreme points of South America
- Extreme points of Peru
- Peru
- Piura Region
