= Máncora =

City in Peru

- City
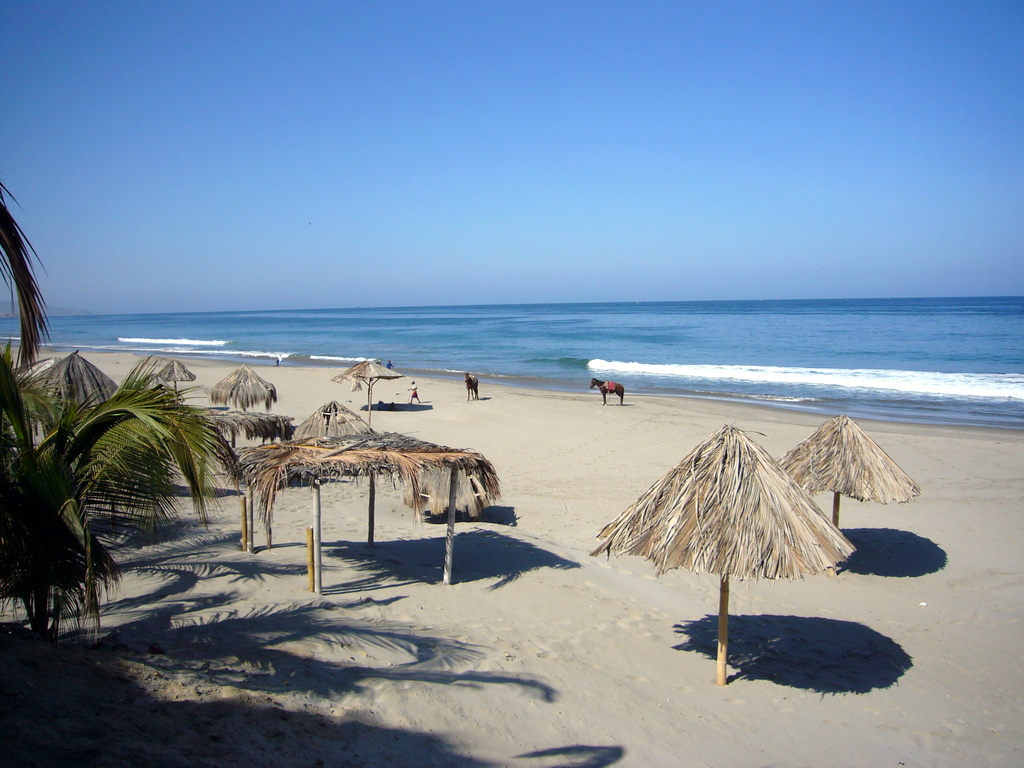
- A beach in Máncora

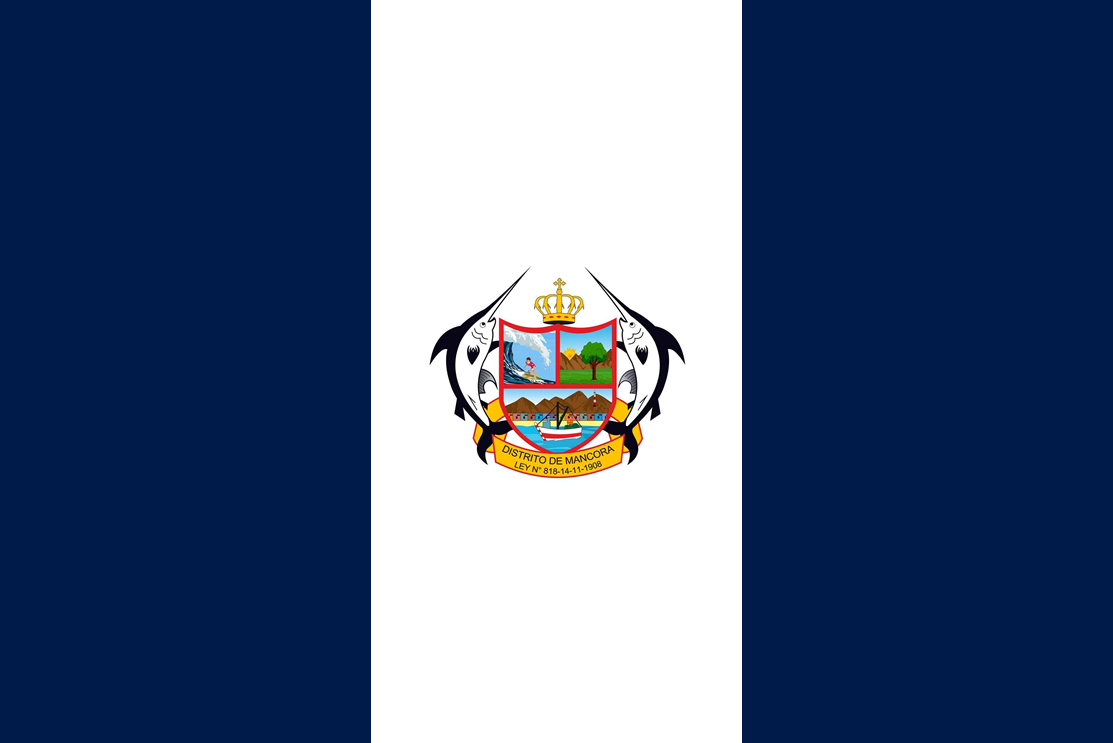
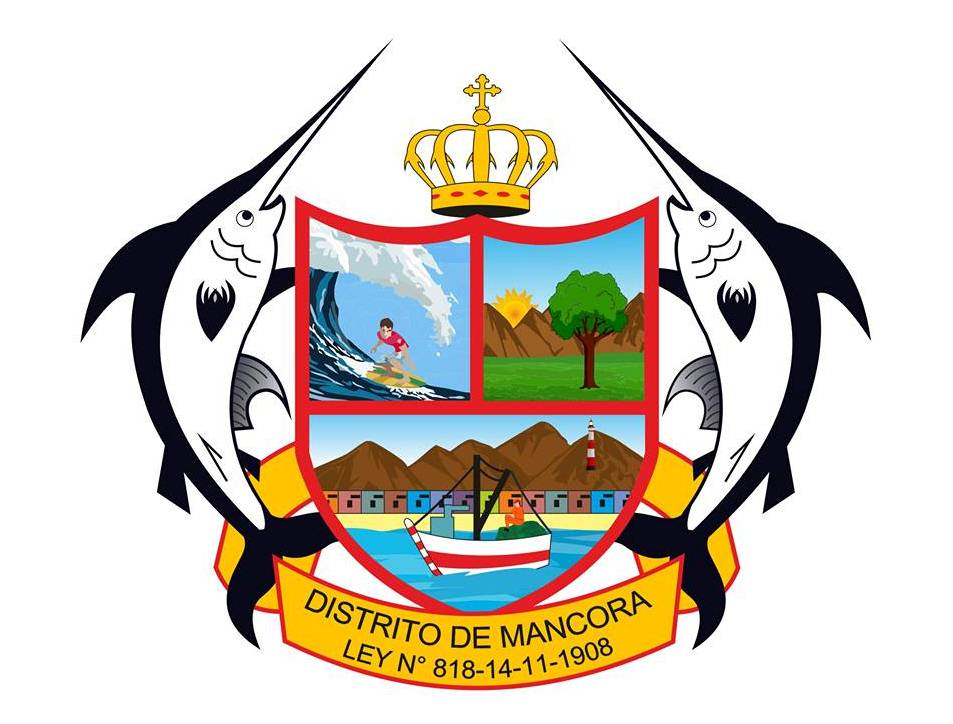
- Flag Coat of arms

- Location within Peru
- Coordinates: 4°06′20″S 81°02′50″W
- Country: Peru
- Department: Piura
- Province: Máncora
- District: Máncora

Government
  - Mayor: José Alexander Ramirez Granda (2019–2022)
- Elevation: 3 m (9.8 ft)

Population (2007)
  - Total: 10,547
- Time zone: UTC-5 (PET)
- Website: munimancora.gob.pe

Máncora is a town and beach resort in the Piura Region, in northwestern Peru. It is located in the Talara Province and is capital of the Máncora District. The town has 10,547 inhabitants (2007).

The Pan-American Highway serves as Máncora's main street. The area is known for its turquoise beaches and good waves, making it a surfing destination. The beach town has over 30 different beach resorts that receive tourists from all over South America. In 2005, 340,000 tourists visited Mancora.

== Climate ==
Máncora has a warm climate with an average of 29 °C. The hot months, which are from November to May, are characterized by light rains at night and a temperature that can easily reach 35 °C (February and March). With the occurrence of El Niño phenomenon, it can go up to 40 °C. In the rest of the year, the daytime temperature rarely drops below 25 or 26 °C, although in winters; from June to September, the nights are cool, windy and the minimum temperature drops to 19 °C. Spring (October and November) and autumn (May and June) maintain temperatures ranging between 20 °C and 30 °C respectively.

The sea temperature in Piura and Tumbes varies. The temperature ranges from 24 °C to 26 °C during the summer months (from December to May) and the rest of the year between 21 °C to 23 °C; something that differentiates it from the rest of Peruvian beaches further south of these regions, since these rarely rise above 22 °C, even in summer. This is due to the significant influence of the Humboldt current.

== Sports ==
Máncora's bay attracts surfers and kite surfers.

== Health ==
In health, it has a health center at Minsa and the Consultorio Médico Flores, Avenida Grau 184, 999455314, which has been operating since January 1990 and is a graduate of the UNMSM in Lima.

== Gallery ==
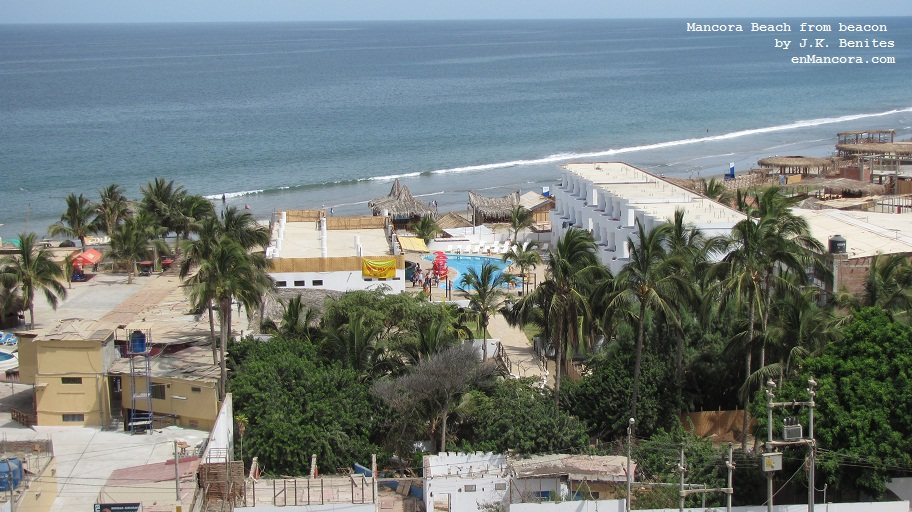
Mancora Beach

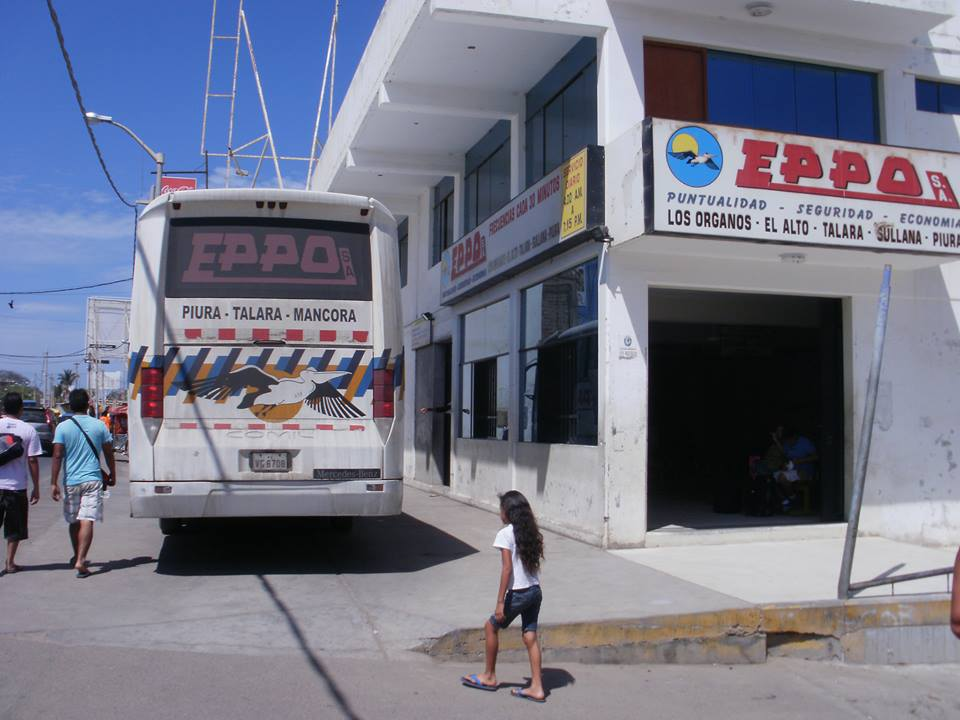
One of a few bus companies on the main street in Mancora

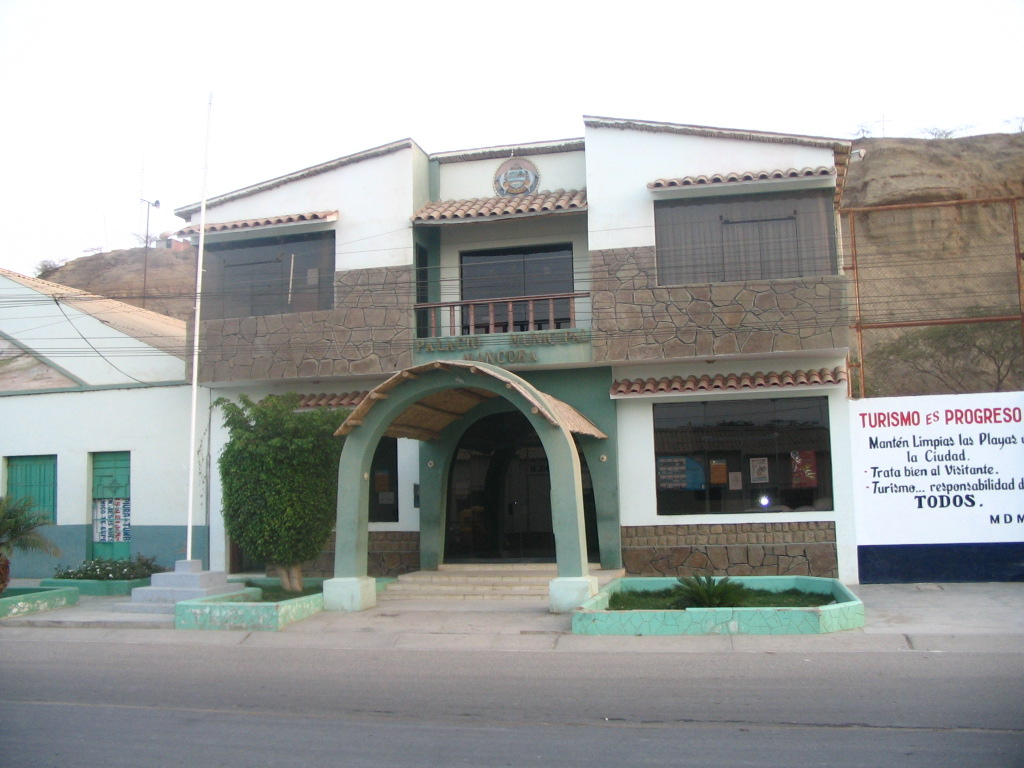
Town hall in Mancora

== See also ==
- Iperu
- Tourism in Peru
