= Máncora District =

Coordinates: 4.1031°S 81.0481°W

Máncora
- District
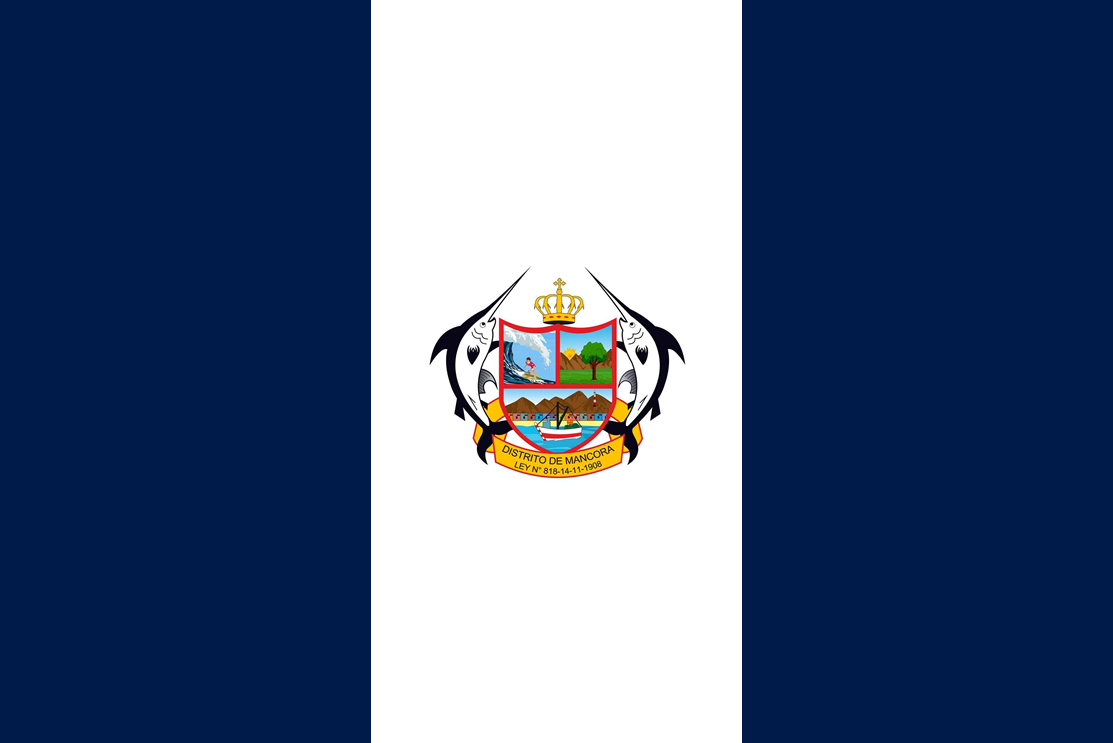
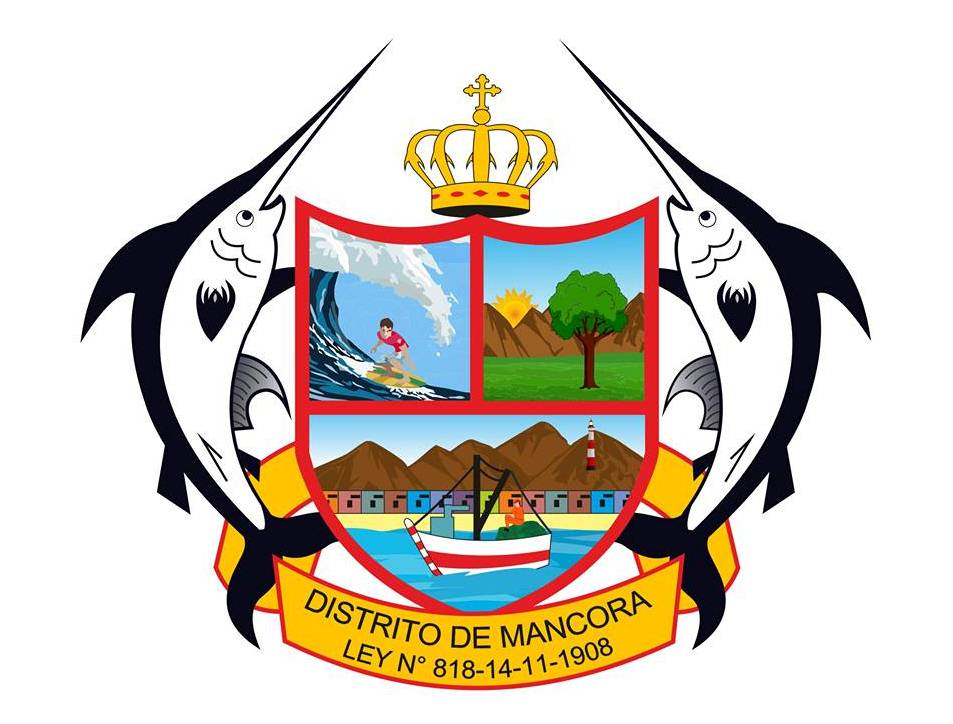
- Flag Coat of arms

- Location of Máncora in the Talara province
- Country: Peru
- Region: Piura
- Province: Talara
- Founded: November 14, 1908
- Capital: Máncora

Government
  - Mayor: José Alexander Ramirez Granda (2019-2022)

Area
  - Total: 100.19 km^{2} (38.68 sq mi)
- Elevation: 3 m (9.8 ft)

Population (2017)
  - Total: 13,028
  - Density: 130.03/km^{2} (336.78/sq mi)
- Time zone: UTC-5 (PET)
- UBIGEO: 200706

Máncora District is a district in the Talara Province of the Piura Region in northwestern Peru. Its capital is the beach resort town of Máncora. It was officially established as a district on November 14, 1908.

== Towns and villages ==
- Máncora
- Angola
- Las Pocitas Mancora Chico
- Las Pocitas Tourist portal
- Mancora Chico Tourist portal
- Las Pocitas Beach at Mancora Guide

== Boundaries ==
Las Pocitas Beach is a special place of Mancora District.

- North: Zorritos District (in the Tumbes Region)
- East: Marcavelica District (Sullana Province)
- South: Los Órganos District
- West: Pacific Ocean

== Demographics ==
According to the 2005 Census, the district has 8,570 inhabitants.
