= Sullana =

- City
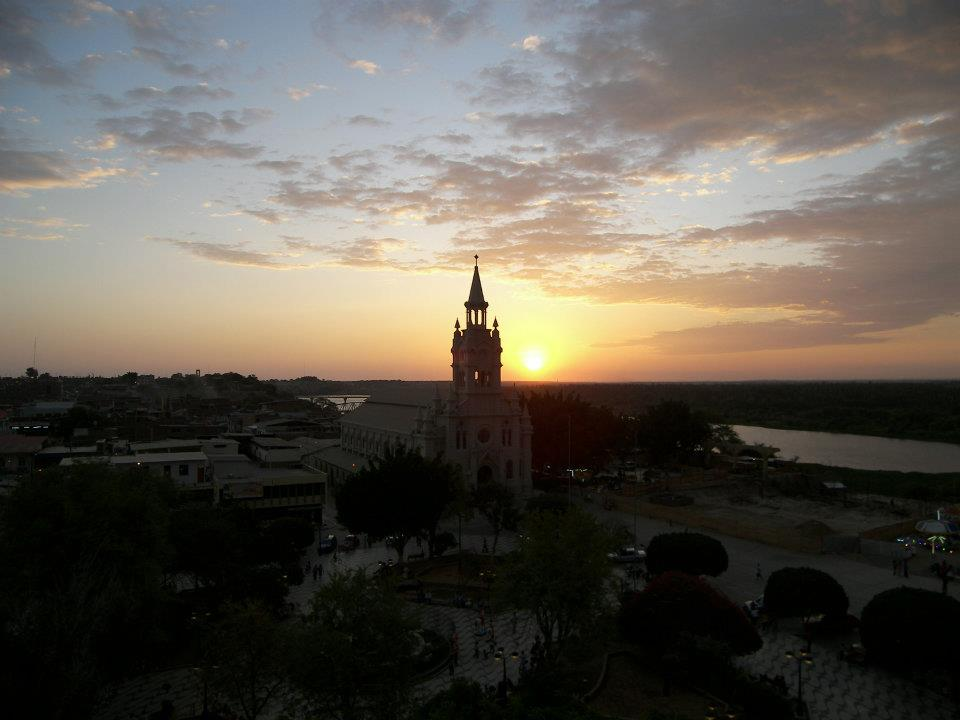
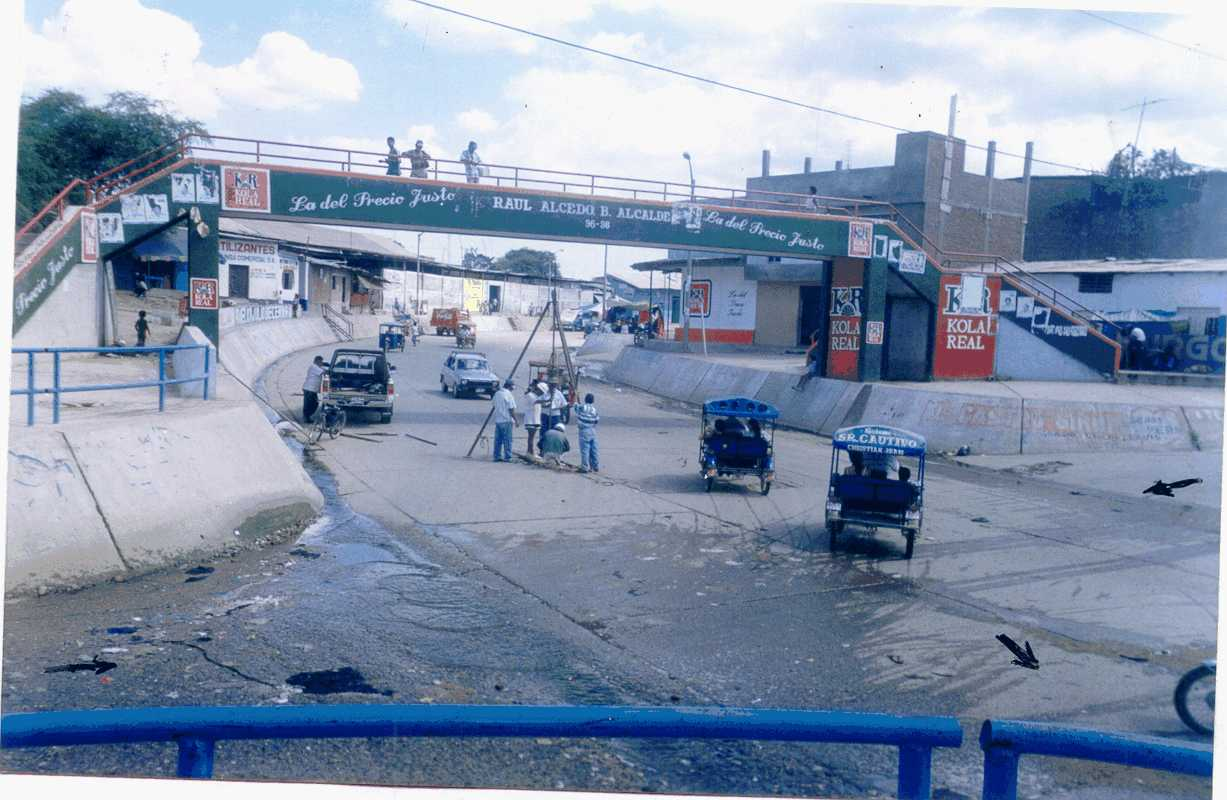
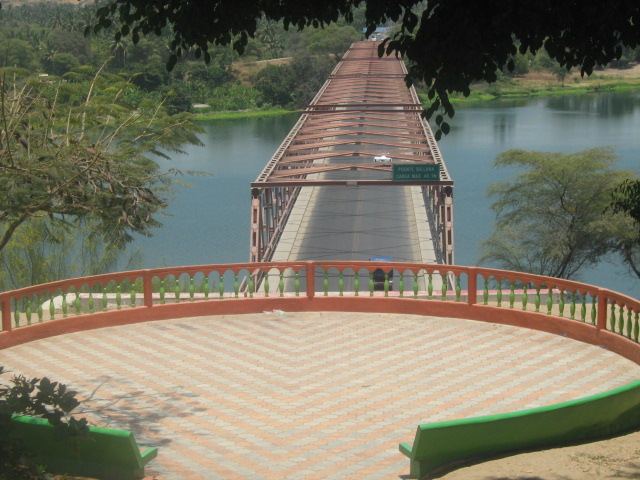
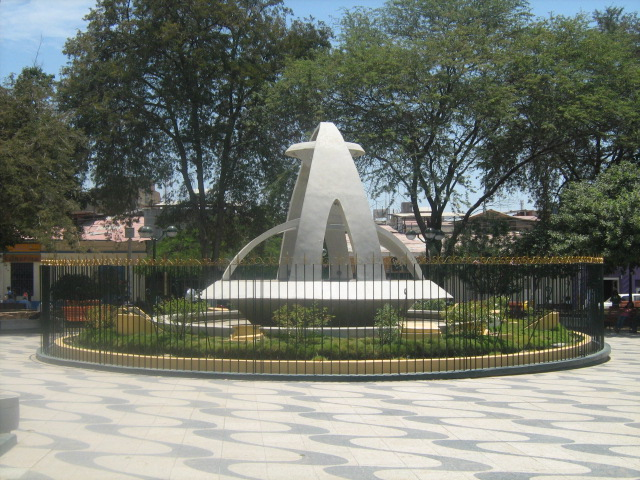
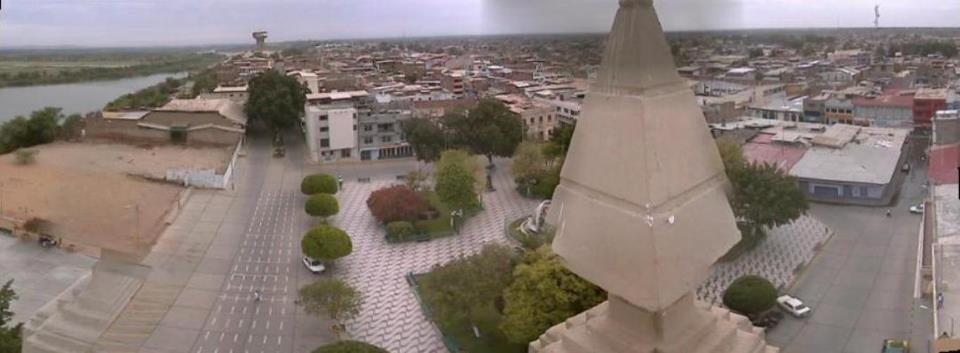

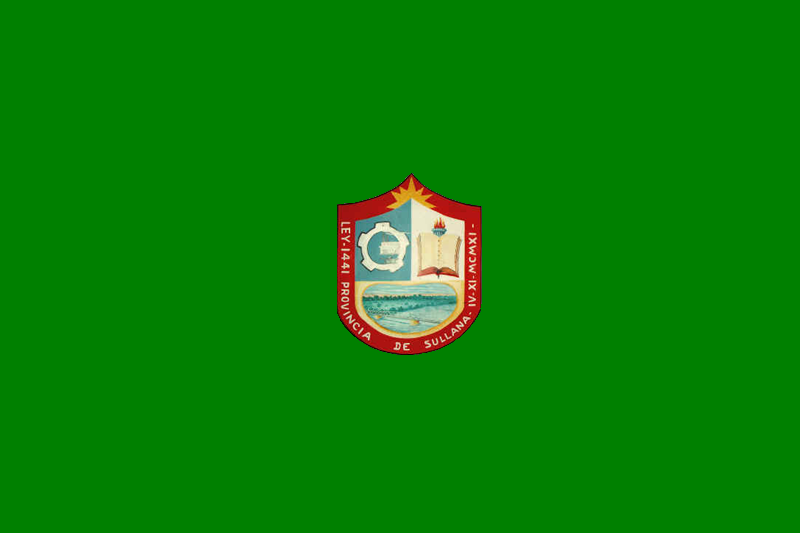
- Flag
- Nickname: La Perla del Chira (The Chira's Pearl)
- Interactive map of Sullana
- Location within Peru
- Coordinates: 4°54′14″S 80°41′7″W
- Country: Peru
- Region: Piura
- Province: Sullana
- Founded: July 8, 1783

Government
  - Mayor: Edward Power Saldaña Sánchez

Area
  - Total: 488.01 km^{2} (188.42 sq mi)
- Elevation: 65 m (213 ft)

Population
  - Estimate (2015): 201,302
- Time zone: UTC-05:00 (PET)

Sullana is a city in Peru and the capital of the Sullana Province, in the Piura region. Located in the north-western coastal plains on the Chira valley, the city is home to 225,615 people as of 2020 and is one of the most important cities in the Piura department. It was founded in 1783 as Santísima Trinidad de La Punta.

== History ==
The Chira valley has always been an important farming area. Before the Spanish Invasion, ethnic groups like the Tallanes, the Mochicas, the Chimú, and finally the Incas had settled here. This region was chosen by the Spaniards to found their first city in this part of the Americas, San Miguel de Tangarara, on July 15, 1532. The Spaniards changed the native farming system and created Repartimientos and Encomiendas.

Sullana was founded late in the 18th century, on July 8, 1783, by Bishop Baltazar Jaime Martínez de Compañon y Bufanda and given the name of "El Principe" (The Prince).

== Geography ==
=== Location ===
Sullana is located at 04°53' south latitude and 80°41' west longitude, 38 km north of Piura, the capital of the region.

=== Climate ===
The province has a Hot Desert climate and an average temperature of 27 °C degrees. The minimum temperature is 16 °C and the maximum temperature is 38 °C (can go over 42 °C mark if the El Niño phenomenon is present).

The city is irrigated by the Chira River, the area around the capital city of Sullana is very fertile and there is much lush, tropical vegetation: Coconut palm trees, banana trees, paddy fields, etc. Sullana is an important commercial centre in one of Peru's major cotton-growing areas, along with the San Martín Region and the smaller Tumbes Region. A new sugar cane plantation has been planted nearby to produce maple ethanol for ethanol production.

Climate data for Sullana (Mallares), elevation 44 m (144 ft), (1991–2020)
Month	Jan	Feb	Mar	Apr	May	Jun	Jul	Aug	Sep	Oct	Nov	Dec	Year
Mean daily maximum °C (°F)	34.5 (94.1)	35.0 (95.0)	34.9 (94.8)	34.1 (93.4)	32.1 (89.8)	30.2 (86.4)	29.6 (85.3)	29.8 (85.6)	30.6 (87.1)	30.9 (87.6)	31.5 (88.7)	33.1 (91.6)	32.2 (90.0)
Mean daily minimum °C (°F)	21.7 (71.1)	23.0 (73.4)	22.9 (73.2)	21.6 (70.9)	19.8 (67.6)	18.6 (65.5)	17.7 (63.9)	17.4 (63.3)	17.4 (63.3)	17.7 (63.9)	18.2 (64.8)	19.7 (67.5)	19.6 (67.4)
Average precipitation mm (inches)	24.6 (0.97)	49.9 (1.96)	78.1 (3.07)	21.6 (0.85)	4.1 (0.16)	0.4 (0.02)	0.2 (0.01)	0.0 (0.0)	0.1 (0.00)	1.0 (0.04)	1.1 (0.04)	9.4 (0.37)	190.5 (7.49)
Source: National Meteorology and Hydrology Service of Peru

== Demographics ==
Migration to Sullana has been intensive, but "pueblos jóvenes" (shanty towns) are neither widespread nor conspicuous, as they are in Piura for example. The population in Sullana was 112,770 in 1981, 147,361 in 1993 and c. 162,500 in 2005.

== Transportation ==
Sullana has good bus connections to the north, to Piura in the south, as well as inland to Ayabaca and to La Tina on the Ecuadorian border. The Canal Vía runs across the city.

The Tren de la Costa is planned, which will connect the coast of Peru from Sullana to the southernmost city of Tacna.

== Tourism ==
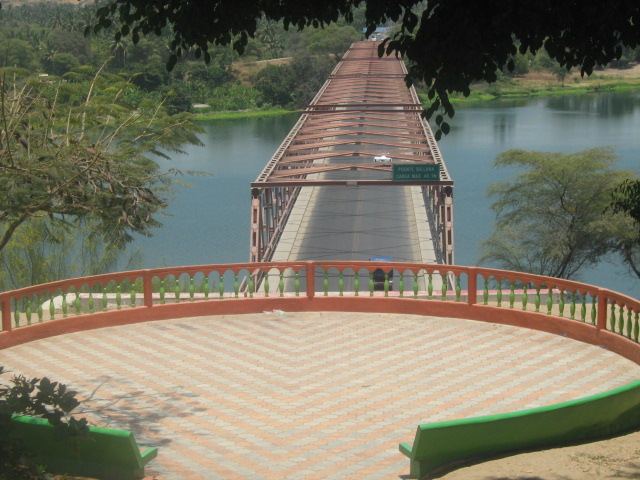
Mirador de Sullana

In the first week of January the Feria Internacional de los Reyes is celebrated. The Poechos Reservoir, 27 km from the city, offers water sports like water skiing, motor-boating, fishing and swimming.
