= La Marina Lighthouse =

Lighthouse in Miraflores, Lima, Peru

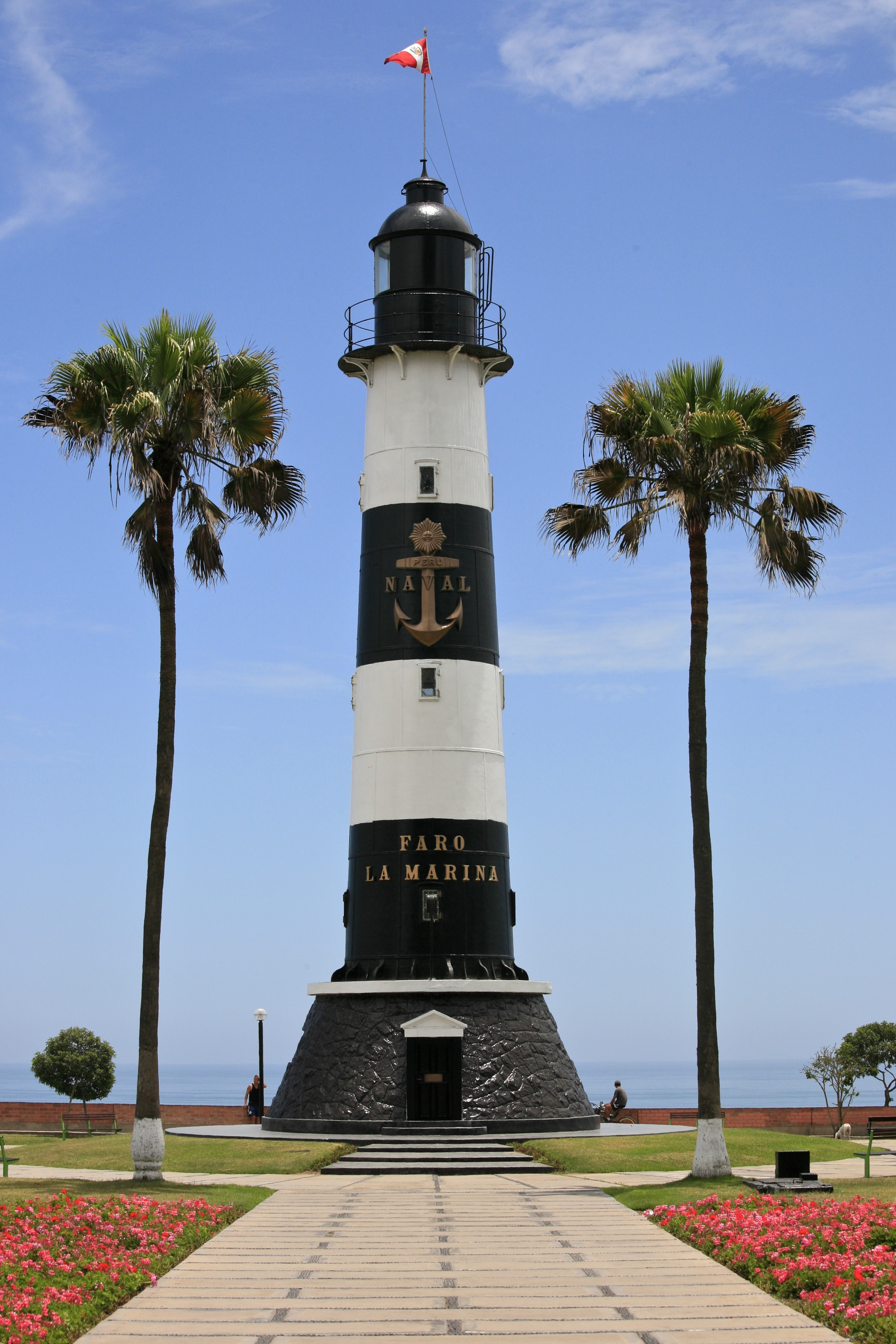
- The lighthouse in 2014
- Location: Miraflores, Lima, Peru
- Coordinates: 12.123722°S 77.040097°W

Tower
- Constructed: 1900
- Foundation: Concrete
- Construction: Metal tower
- Height: 22 metres (72 ft)
- Shape: Cylindrical tower with gallery and lantern
- Markings: Blue navy painted with two white horizontal bands, blue lantern
- Power source: mains electricity

Light
- First lit: 1972 (relocated)
- Focal height: 108 metres (354 ft)
- Range: 18 nautical miles (33 km; 21 mi)
- Peru no.: PE-22166

La Marina Lighthouse (Spanish: Faro de la Marina) is an active lighthouse set in parkland on high cliffs above the Pacific Ocean, in the Miraflores district of Lima, the capital of Peru. It is one of the most famous and visited lighthouses in the country.

== History ==
The lighthouse was originally constructed in 1900 at Punta Coles, a headland near Ilo, but in 1973 it was dismantled and reconstructed in Miraflores. It is situated in the appropriately named Parque del Faro, one of a number of popular parks above the cliffs in the city, which commemorates a century of Peruvian navigation.

It consists of a 22 m (72 ft) high iron tower, with a gallery and lantern, painted a very dark blue, with two white bands.

With a focal height of 108 metres (354 ft) above the sea, its light can be seen for 18 nautical miles (33 km), and consists of a pattern of three flashes of white light, over a period of fifteen seconds.

== See also ==
- List of lighthouses in Peru
