= Poechos Reservoir =

Lake in Peru

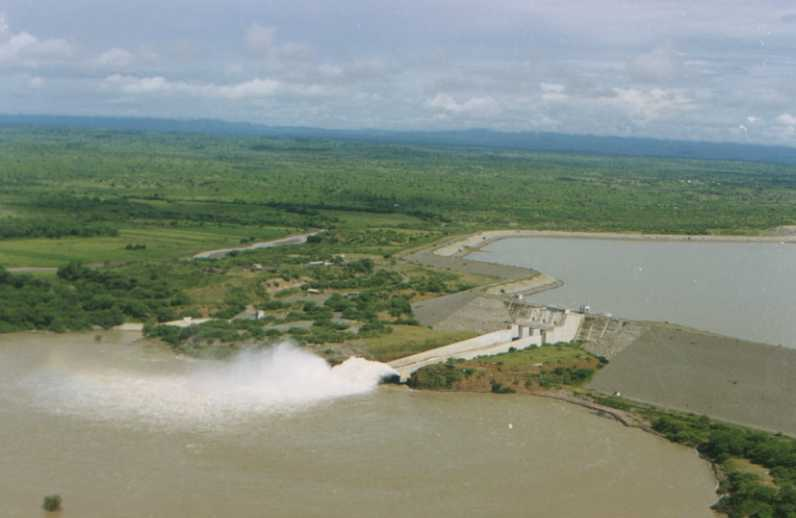

- Location within Peru
- Coordinates: 4°40′07″S 80°30′13″W
- Type: reservoir
- Catchment area: 14,000 m^{2} (150,000 sq ft)
- Basin countries: Peru
- Max. depth: 46 m (151 ft)
- Water volume: 406,500,000 cubic metres (1.436×10^{10} cu ft)

Poechos Reservoir is a middle-sized reservoir on Peru's Chira River in the border area between Peru and Ecuador. Its purpose is to improve the accumulation of water stocks in the upper part of Peru's Chira basin by flood control, irrigation, drainage and electricity generation.

== Location ==
The Poechos Reservoir is situated in the northernmost part of Peru, in the lower flow of the rivers Chira and Piura, about 50 km north of Piura, the capital of the Piura Region. It is located on 4° 3' southern latitude and 80° 2' western longitude at an altitude of 98 m in the Lancones district of the province of Sullana, approximately 30 km from the border with Ecuador.

== History ==
The system was built in support of agrarian reform and infrastructure policies led by the military dictatorship of Juan Velasco Alvarado. Construction was carried out in four phases, the first of which was constructed by Yugoslav contractor Energoprojekt and supervised by the Peruvian subsidiary of British company Binnie & Partners. Works started on 24 June 1972, with inauguration taking place on 4 June 1976.

Phases of the project go as follow:

=== Phase 1 (1970 to 1977) ===
The first phase included the construction of

- the rock filled Poechos dam (9 km long with a maximum height of about 55 m and a total excavation volume of 9,000,000 m^{3};
- the diversion tunnel built into the bottom outlet with a maximum capacity of 14 m^{3}/s;
- the concrete gravitational block of the overflow structure (400,000 m^{3} concrete) with radial gates with a total capacity up to, 500 m^{3}/s;
- the safety overflow of circa 200 m length with a capacity up to 10,000 m^{3}/s;
- the headwater discharge and the headwater channel with a capacity of 70 m^{3}/s (8,00,000 m^{3} excavation and 1,000,000 m^{3} of concrete for channel lining);
- the channel drainage system in the lower Chira (10,000,000 m^{3} excavation in total) flows through over 1,000 structures on the channel network (overflows, outlets, gates, etc.)

=== Phase 2 (1978 to 1985) ===
The second phase covered

- the headwater dam Los Ejedos which is 220 m long with a maximum height of 20 m and a gate capacity of 3,000 m^{3}/s;
- the main channel, which is 42 km long and has a capacity of 45 m^{3}/s;
- the protecting embankments (60 km long) along the Piura;
- the channel system with supporting structures over an area of 350 km^{2}.

=== Phase 3 (1985 to 1997) ===
The third phase consisted of

- the headwater dam Sullana which is 75 m long, has a maximum height of 12 m and has gates with a total capacity of up to 5,000 m^{3}/s;
- the headwater channel Norte with a capacity of 25,500 m^{3}/s over 56 km which irrigate 150 km^{2};
- the channel Sur which is circa 35 km long with a capacity of 7 m^{3}/s for irrigation of about 70 km^{2} (in total about 5,000,000 m^{3} excavation);
- about 60 km of dykes along the regulated river bed in the lower Chira flow (about 5,500,000 m^{3} of embankment).

=== Phase 4 (2002 to 2004) ===
The final phase included

- the 12.5 MW Curumuy dam and power plant, completed in 2000;
- the 15.4 MW Poechos I Hydroelectric Project which was completed in 2004.

== Capacities ==
The capacity of the reservoir is 1,000,000,000 m^{3}, its catchment area 14,000 m^{2}, its maximum depth 46 m.

The irrigation dam is 49 m high and 9 km wide at crest and at its bottom has a conduit to discharge water at a rate of 4 m^{3}/s.

The original design brief was to revitalise the Piura valley, which was short of water, and provide modern irrigation for approximately 350 km^{2} of arable land.

The Poechos I Hydroelectric Plant is operated by Sindicato Energético S.A (SINERSA). The Poechos I power house has 15.4 MW in installed capacity and generates 60 GW·h annually for Electronoroeste, the concessionary for energy distribution in northwestern Peru. The power plant is to accomplish a 90% national electrification level of the country by the year 2010 by using a zero emission energy source.
