= Talara province =

Coordinates: 4°34′47″S 81°16′19″W

Talara
- Province
- Coat of arms

- Location of Talara in the Piura Region
- Country: Peru
- Region: Piura Region
- Founded: March 16, 1956
- Capital: Talara

Government
  - Mayor: Jose Alfredo Vitonera Infante

Area
  - Total: 2,799.49 km^{2} (1,080.89 sq mi)
- Elevation: 2,178 m (7,146 ft)

Population
  - Total: 144,150
  - Density: 51.492/km^{2} (133.36/sq mi)
- UBIGEO: 2007
- Website: www.munitalara.gob.pe

Talara is a province in the Piura Region, Peru. It is bordered by the Pacific Ocean on the west, the province of Paita on the south, the province of Sullana on the east and the Tumbes Region's province of Contralmirante Villar on the north. Its capital is the major port city of Talara. It also contains the beach resort of Máncora. The province was created by the President Manuel A. Odría in 1956.

== Attractions ==
The province has tourist attractions such as the Máncora beach resort, Cabo Blanco beach, Punta Balcones, Pariñas Forest, Amotape mountains, a whale fossils deposit, Plataforma del Zócalo Continental, Punta Arenas Houses, Talara Refinery and the Talara Civic Centre. Talara had the greatest reserve of oil in all Peru.

Punta Pariñas, the westernmost point in mainland South America, is located in the province's La Brea District.

== Climate ==
The province of Talara has a yearly average temperature of 25 °C (77 °F).

== Political division ==
The province is divided into six districts (Spanish: distritos, singular: distrito), each of which is headed by a mayor (alcalde):

- El Alto
- La Brea
- Lobitos
- Los Organos
- Máncora
- Pariñas

== Transportation ==
It is linked to the rest of the country by various highways and the Cap. FAP Víctor Montes Arias Airport.
