= Punta Arenas, Peru =

Planned community in Peru

Punta Arenas
- neighborhood
- Interactive map of Punta Arenas
- Coordinates: 4.5901°S 81.2854°W
- Country: Peru
- Region: Piura
- Province: Talara
- Postal code: 20811

Punta Arenas, also known as Punta Arenas Condominium, is a planned community for workers in the oil industry, northern Peru. It is situated on the coastal outskirts of the city of Talara in Piura region, adjoining the south edge of the Talara refinery. Originally built for workers from the US, today it is the property of state-owned Petroperú.

== History ==
Punta Arenas was originally built by the International Petroleum Company (IPC). It was designed to house the supervisors and administrative staff. Once an employee of the company (originally Americans) was appointed supervisor, he and his family were relocated and entitled to one of the houses on a loan basis.

It featured all the facilities that a resident American family would need: 110-volt A/C, a constant gas supply, an exclusive two–pool club for residents, a beach, one private residence for the company manager and another one for official guests overlooking the beach, and an elementary school (Talara Staff School) and middle school which initially followed the American school system. Sidewalks were nonexistent, although a 25 km/h speed limit was in place. All houses were equally attractive, with red bricks, flat roofs, ample space, and lawns. There is a resemblance between Punta Arenas and the area of Coral Gables, Florida, coincidentally the location of IPC's headquarters in the 1940s.

The neighborhood was organized around the letters of the alphabet. Each block of ten houses was assigned a letter, and each house was given a number. Therefore, a given house would be B-10, or W-5. As years went by, and as need for more houses grew, letter combinations like CH and the letter Z were added. Some blocks of houses were specifically designed for unmarried persons, featuring individual rooms with shared bathrooms.

The Talara refinery was at the core of the 1968 Peruvian coup d'état. General Juan Velasco Alvarado almost immediately ordered the seizure and nationalization of its operations and premises, creating Petroperú, in what was a symbolically important act for the new government. The electric power gradually moved to Peruvian standards (220 volts), and the school started to follow the Peruvian school system, offering secondary education. During the 1970s, Punta Arenas retained certain American customs like Thanksgiving and Halloween until all the US citizens left or retired from Petroperú. In the 1980s, virtually no Americans lived in Talara or in Punta Arenas.

The 1980s economic crisis during Alan García's first government widened inequalities and caused resentment from low-income residents of Talara who saw Punta Arenas and its inhabitants as beneficiaries of special privileges. For example, during the 1983 floods caused by El Niño, while the population of the city struggled to find food at excessive prices, Petroperú chartered airplane flights to ship food supplies (including fresh meat and poultry) for its supervisors and their families. Other benefits included transportation, free education, school materials, water, electricity and gas, which were attractive for anyone who accepted to relocate in a now-isolated area of the country.

Towards the end of the 20th century, Punta Arenas became slowly uninhabited due to the decline of Petroperú. Talara refinery faced problems due to declining production and investments and falling oil prices. Some state assets were to be privatized under President Alberto Fujimori's CEPRI commission. This included the residences at Punta Arena, which as of 1999 were rented to other companies. However, the privatization did not go ahead. As an attempt to keep Punta Arenas alive, the houses were unsuccessfully offered for sale or rent to private third parties. Houses in blocks W and X (those closest to the main entrance) were sold to former Petroperu electric power division workers in 2003. Many of the houses in the outskirts became derelict and were demolished, particularly, blocks O, Y and Z (surrounded by the refinery and the seaside), which were vanished to make ground for the refinery expansion in 2010, and blocks T, U, V and CH, which were replaced in 2014 by a new compound built by Técnicas Reunidas, contractor responsible for the modernisation project, to accommodate their own staff. Only the houses that surround the club and the school remain.
