= Pariñas District =

Coordinates: 4°34′52″S 81°16′29″W

Pariñas
- District
- Interactive map of Pariñas
- Country: Peru
- Region: Piura
- Province: Talara
- Founded: October 31, 1932
- Capital: Talara

Government
  - Mayor: José Alfredo Vitonera Infante

Area
  - Total: 1,116.99 km^{2} (431.27 sq mi)
- Elevation: 15 m (49 ft)

Population (2005 census)
  - Total: 84,978
  - Density: 76.078/km^{2} (197.04/sq mi)
- Time zone: UTC-5 (PET)
- UBIGEO: 200701

Pariñas District is one of six districts of the province Talara in Peru.
