= Iperu =

Iperu may refer to:

- Iperú, the Peru tourism office
- Iperu, Ogun, a town in Ogun State, southwestern Nigeria
