= La Brea District =

Coordinates: 4.6544°S 81.3056°W

La Brea
- District
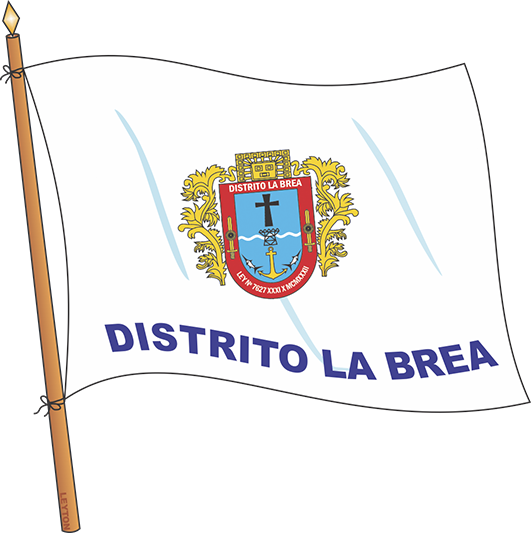
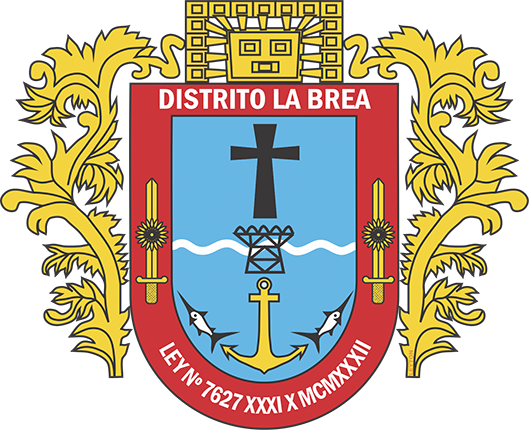
- Flag Coat of arms
- Interactive map of La Brea
- Country: Peru
- Region: Piura
- Province: Talara
- Founded: October 31, 1932
- Capital: Negritos

Government
  - Mayor: Rogger Orlando Genoves Moran

Area
  - Total: 692.96 km^{2} (267.55 sq mi)
- Elevation: 4 m (13 ft)

Population (2017)
  - Total: 12,486
  - Density: 18.018/km^{2} (46.667/sq mi)
- Time zone: UTC-5 (PET)
- UBIGEO: 200703

La Brea District is one of six districts of the province Talara in Peru.
