= Los Órganos District =

Coordinates: 4.1773°S 81.1247°W

Los Organos
- District
- Interactive map of Los Organos
- Country: Peru
- Region: Piura
- Province: Talara
- Founded: December 11, 1964
- Capital: Los Organos

Government
  - Mayor: Manuel Obdulio Quevedo Aleman

Area
  - Total: 165.01 km^{2} (63.71 sq mi)
- Elevation: 3 m (9.8 ft)

Population (2005 census)
  - Total: 9,104
  - Density: 55.17/km^{2} (142.9/sq mi)
- Time zone: UTC-5 (PET)
- UBIGEO: 200705

Los Organos District is one of six districts of the province Talara in Peru.
