= Chira River =

River in Peru

Río Chira
- Chira River flows into the Pacific Ocean between Tumbes and Paita (left down)

- Location of mouth

Location
- Countries: Ecuador; Peru

Physical characteristics
- Mouth: Pacific Ocean
  - coordinates: 4°54′S 81°08′W
  - elevation: 0 m (0 ft)

The Chira River or Rio Chira is a river (as well as a valley) in northern Peru whose mouth is 100 km north west of the provincial capital of Piura and 25 km north of the port of Paita.

Its source is in the Ecuadorian Andes near the town of Papaca in the province Loja from where it flows for ca 250 km in westerly directions. After crossing the border to Peru, it is dammed up in the 885 million m³ Poechos reservoir and later passes the town of Sullana.
