= Piura (disambiguation) =

Piura is a city in Peru.

Piura may also refer to:

- Piura metropolitan area
- Department of Piura, a department and region in Peru
- Piura province, in Piura region
- Piura District, in Piura province
- Piura River, in Piura Region
