= Piura metropolitan area =

Piura Metropolitan Area
- Country: Peru
- Region: Piura
- Province: Piura Province
- Largest city: Piura

Population
  - Total: 450.363(year 2,007); 517.293 (estimated 2,015)
- Time zone: UTC-5 (PET)

The Piura Metropolitan Area is the name used to refer to the metropolitan area whose principal city is Piura, located in northern Peru. According to "Concerted development plan Piura 2009–2014" the districts of Piura, Veintiséis de Octubre, Castilla and Catacaos of Piura Province currently are consolidated into a metropolitan area to act with the same urban, industrial and commercial plan. It is one of the most populous metropolitan area of Peru in year 2015.

== Urban development plan ==
The "Urban development plan of Piura, Castilla y Catacaos 2032" was approved with the document "N° 122-00-CMPP" in December 2012, however it was repealed with the document "N° 122-01-CMPP" on 18 March 2013, and by now is in force the "Director Plan of Piura and Castilla" until the publication of the new Urban development plan of Piura, Castilla y Catacaos.

== Population of metropolitan districts ==
According to Regulator Plan of transportation Routes of the city the metropolis of Piura is the conurbation of Piura, Castilla and Catacaos. According to INEI the population of the districts of Piura metropolitan area is as follows:

| Metropolitan districts | Area km² | Dwelling (Census 2007) | Population minor to 1 year | Density (pop./km²)* | Elevation media msl* | Distance to Piura (km) | Population Census 2007* | Estimated Population 2015 | Estimated Population 2020 |
|---|---|---|---|---|---|---|---|---|---|
| Piura and Veintiséis de Octubre | 330,32 km² | 4.850* | 57.190 | 778,21 | 29 | 0 km | 260 363* | 301 311 | 365 535 |
| Castilla | 662,23 km² | 2.502* | 26.867 | 186,78 | 30 | a la plaza "Luis Montero" 0,3 km | 123 692* | 143 203 | 183 759 |
| Catacaos | 2565,78 km² | 1.401* | 14.158 | 25,84 | 23 | a la plaza "Juan De Mori" 11 km | 66 308* | 72 779 | 80 950 |
| Total | 3558,33 km² | 8.753* | 98.215 | 126,56 | — | — | 450 363* | 517 293 | 630 244 |
*Census 2007 – INEI

== See also ==
- Piura Province
- List of metropolitan areas of Peru
- Peru
