= Narihualá =

Archaeological site in Peru

- Huaca Narihualá
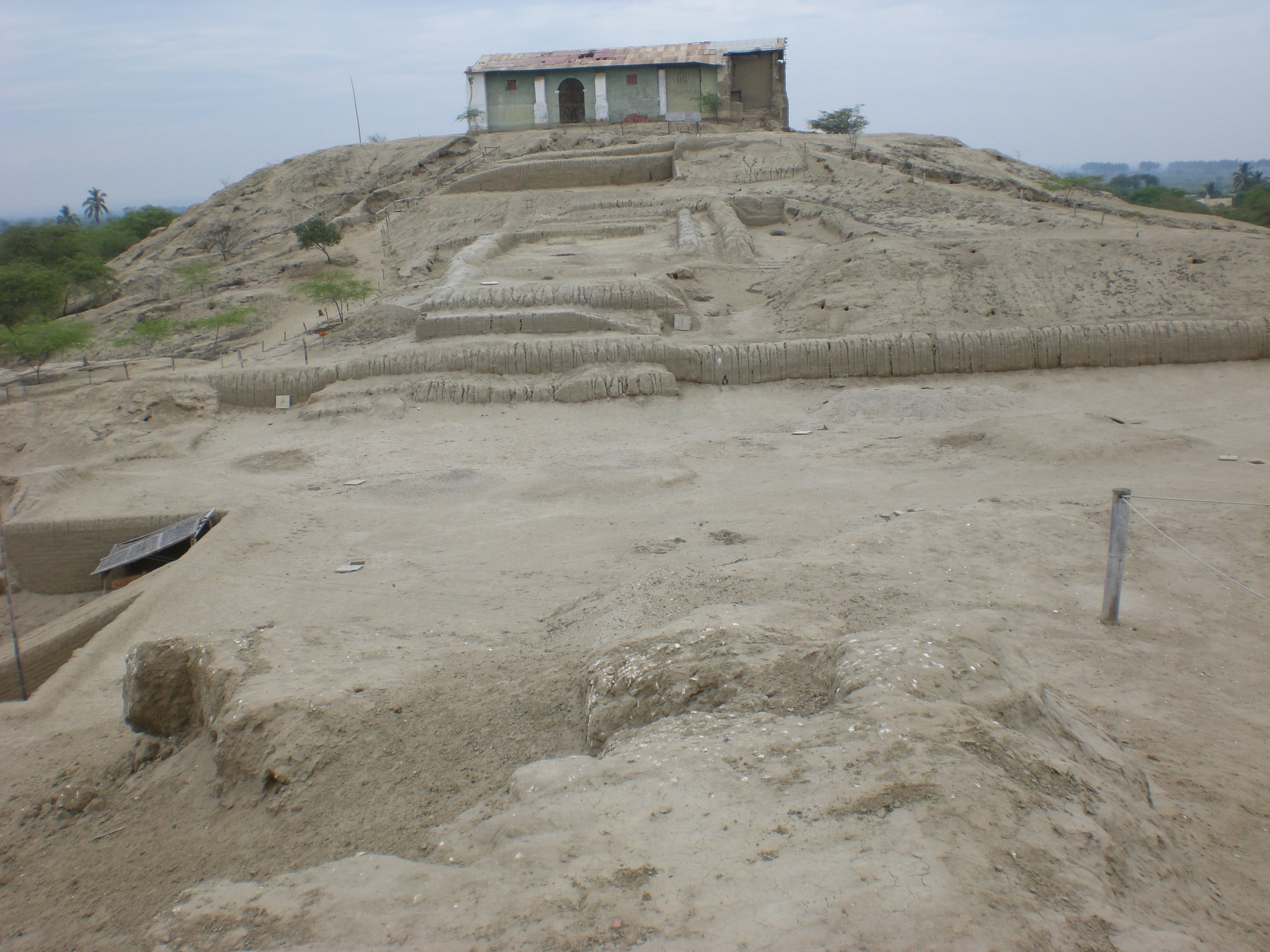
- Panoramic view of Narihualá

- Location within Peru Location within South America
- Interactive map of Narihualá
- 5°17′40″S 80°41′13″W
- Type: Settlement
- Cultures: Tallán
- Location: Catacaos District, Piura Province, Piura Region, Peru
- Region: Piura valley (North of Peru)

History
- Built by: Tallán culture

Site notes
- Material: Adobe
- Elevation: 22 m (72 ft)
- Owner: Peruvian Government
- Public access: Yes

Narihualá is an archaeological site in Peru. It is located in the Piura Region, Catacaos District a 17 km south of Piura. Is considered the capital of the Tallán Nation and is the most important architectural evidence of a great monument, both in its size and the prominent platforms of two pyramids.
