= Angostura, Sullana =

Angostura
- Village
- Location within Peru
- Coordinates: 4°56′38″S 80°22′37″W
- Country: Peru
- Region: Piura
- Province: Sullana
- Elevation: 92 m (301 ft)
- Time zone: UTC-5 (PET)
  - Summer (DST): UTC-5 (PET)

Angostura is a small village in Sullana Province, Piura Region, on the northwestern coastal plains of Peru. It is approximately halfway between the towns of Chulucanas and Sullana in the Loma Blanca hills between the Chira River and the Piura River.
