= Chato, Peru =

Town in Cura Mori District, Piura, Peru

Coordinates: 05°20′42″S 080°39′37″W

Chato is a small town in Cura Mori District in the province of Piura in Peru. The town lies on banks of the Piura River.

The town periodically suffers significant flooding, most recently in 2017.
