= Tambo Grande District =

Tambo Grande
- District
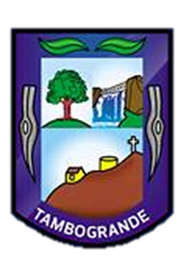
- Coat of arms
- Interactive map of Tambo Grande
- Coordinates: 4°55′05″S 80°19′59″W
- Country: Peru
- Region: Piura
- Province: Piura
- Founded: October 8, 1840
- Capital: Tambogrande

Government
  - Mayor: Gabriel Madrid (Partido Político Agro Sí) (2015–2018)

Area
  - Total: 1,442.81 km^{2} (557.07 sq mi)
- Elevation: 68 m (223 ft)

Population (2005 census)
  - Total: 92,221
  - Density: 63.918/km^{2} (165.55/sq mi)
- Time zone: UTC-5 (PET)
- UBIGEO: 200114

Tambo Grande District is one of ten districts of the province Piura in Peru. It was founded in 1840.
