= Chulucanas District =

Coordinates: 5.0965°S 80.1609°W

Chulucanas
- District
- Interactive map of Chulucanas
- Country: Peru
- Region: Piura
- Province: Morropón
- Founded: January 31, 1936
- Capital: Chulucanas

Government
  - Mayor: Fermin Edilberto Farias Zapata

Area
  - Total: 871.19 km^{2} (336.37 sq mi)
- Elevation: 92 m (302 ft)

Population (2005 census)
  - Total: 77,749
  - Density: 89.245/km^{2} (231.14/sq mi)
- Time zone: UTC-5 (PET)
- UBIGEO: 200401
- Website: munichulucanas.gob.pe

Chulucanas District is one of ten districts of the province Morropón in Peru. Its administrative headquarters is in the town of Chulucanas.

== Climate ==
Climate data for Chulucanas, elevation 89 m (292 ft), (1991–2020)
Month	Jan	Feb	Mar	Apr	May	Jun	Jul	Aug	Sep	Oct	Nov	Dec	Year
Mean daily maximum °C (°F)	34.1 (93.4)	33.8 (92.8)	33.6 (92.5)	33.3 (91.9)	32.1 (89.8)	30.5 (86.9)	30.6 (87.1)	31.6 (88.9)	32.9 (91.2)	33.2 (91.8)	33.4 (92.1)	33.7 (92.7)	32.7 (90.9)
Mean daily minimum °C (°F)	21.2 (70.2)	22.2 (72.0)	21.9 (71.4)	20.7 (69.3)	18.8 (65.8)	17.5 (63.5)	16.5 (61.7)	16.0 (60.8)	16.2 (61.2)	16.9 (62.4)	17.6 (63.7)	19.3 (66.7)	18.7 (65.7)
Average precipitation mm (inches)	20.9 (0.82)	89.4 (3.52)	128.7 (5.07)	44.0 (1.73)	2.8 (0.11)	0.8 (0.03)	0.2 (0.01)	0.1 (0.00)	0.2 (0.01)	1.9 (0.07)	2.4 (0.09)	3.7 (0.15)	295.1 (11.61)
Source: National Meteorology and Hydrology Service of Peru
