= Querecotillo District =

Coordinates: 4.8400°S 80.6490°W

Querecotillo
- District
- Interactive map of Querecotillo
- Country: Peru
- Region: Piura
- Province: Sullana
- Capital: Querecotillo

Government
  - Mayor: Santos Ramon Silupu Ruiz

Area
  - Total: 270.08 km^{2} (104.28 sq mi)
- Elevation: 65 m (213 ft)

Population (2005 census)
  - Total: 24,038
  - Density: 89.003/km^{2} (230.52/sq mi)
- Time zone: UTC-5 (PET)
- UBIGEO: 200607
- Website: muniquerecotillo.gob.pe

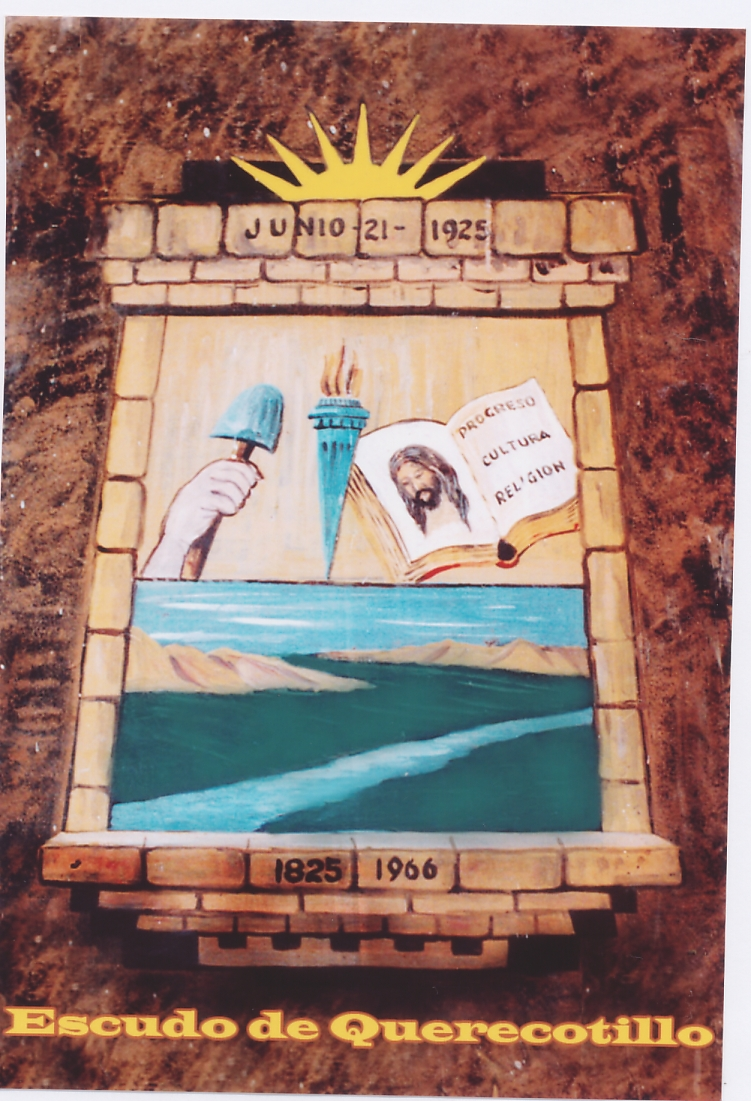

Querecotillo District is one of eight districts of the province Sullana in Peru.
