= Chulucanas =

Chulucanas Chulucana
- Town
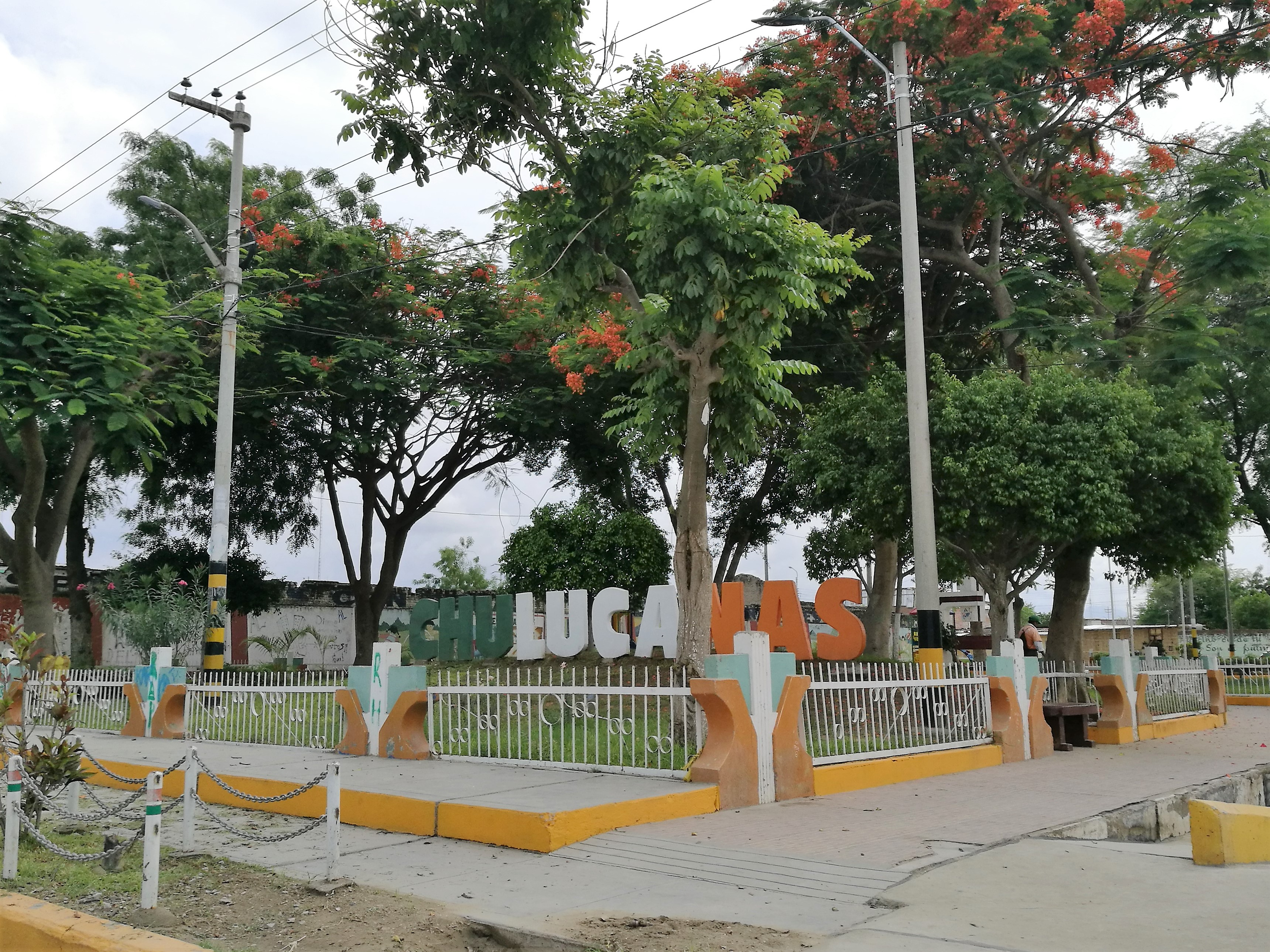

- Flag

- Location within Peru
- Coordinates: 05°05′46″S 80°09′53″W
- Country: Peru
- Region: Piura Region
- Province: Morropón
- District: Chulucanas

Government
  - Mayor: Nelson Mio Reyes
- Elevation: 92 m (302 ft)

Population (2017)
  - Total: 82,521
  - Estimate (2015): 57,380

Chulucanas is a town in Morropón Province, Piura Region, Peru. It lies in the Piura Valley just north of the confluence of the Charanal River with the Piura River. Chulucanas is the administrative seat for both Chulucanas District and Morropón Province.

The town is famous for its pottery. Originally dating from pre-Incan times, it is exported all over the world today. It is one of seven products that the Peruvian government supports through its Center for Technological Innovation (CITE). Designs are varied, but are predominated by black and white. There are several bigger companies, but many small manufacturers are in Chulucanas and the nearby village of Quatro Esquinas.

A major festival for the town is the Fiesta de Cristo Resucitado at Easter.

Operating in Chulucanas is Victor's Vision, a nonprofit organization that provides supplemental academic and personal support, guidance, and resources to bright, impoverished youth.

In 2013, Chulucanas recorded a temperature of 39.8 °C (103.6 °F), which is the joint highest temperature to have ever been recorded in Peru along with the Lancones District.

== Ceramics production ==
The region of Chulucanas – in the province of Morropón – produces a type of ceramic officially labeled with the appellation of origin Chulucanas.

The main natural components of Chulucanas pottery are clay, sand, mango leaves, and the climate. For the elaboration of Chulucanas ceramics, the clay is extracted from certain quarries containing mainly yellow clay (arcilla amarilla) and black clay (arcilla negra). These particular types of clay contain divided particles that characterize not only their plasticity, but also their organic content of iron oxide and organic waste. The type of clay is also responsible for giving brightness to the ceramic when it is burnished.

The artisans of Chulucanas use distinctive ancestral techniques from ancient cultures such as the Vicús and the Tallán. Before completion, each ceramic piece will undergo a dozen steps. The artisans mold the raw clay with their hands and feet, then use wooden pallets and stones to shape it better. The first colors, derived from natural sources such as leaves and soil pigment, are added. Then the pieces are placed in an oven and submerged for hours in the smoke of burning mango leaves, which gives Chulucanas pottery its characteristic black color. To complete the piece, the ceramic is polished by hand with a black stone to give it a brilliant shine.

In 2006, the Asociación de Ceramistas Vicús, the Asociación Civil de Ceramistas Tierra Encantada, and the CITE Cerámica de Chulucanas filed a request for the appellation of origin Chulucana, which was registered in 2008.

== Climate ==
Climate data for Chulucanas, elevation 89 m (292 ft), (1991–2020)
Month	Jan	Feb	Mar	Apr	May	Jun	Jul	Aug	Sep	Oct	Nov	Dec	Year
Mean daily maximum °C (°F)	34.1 (93.4)	33.8 (92.8)	33.6 (92.5)	33.3 (91.9)	32.1 (89.8)	30.5 (86.9)	30.6 (87.1)	31.6 (88.9)	32.9 (91.2)	33.2 (91.8)	33.4 (92.1)	33.7 (92.7)	32.7 (90.9)
Mean daily minimum °C (°F)	21.2 (70.2)	22.2 (72.0)	21.9 (71.4)	20.7 (69.3)	18.8 (65.8)	17.5 (63.5)	16.5 (61.7)	16.0 (60.8)	16.2 (61.2)	16.9 (62.4)	17.6 (63.7)	19.3 (66.7)	18.7 (65.7)
Average precipitation mm (inches)	20.9 (0.82)	89.4 (3.52)	128.7 (5.07)	44.0 (1.73)	2.8 (0.11)	0.8 (0.03)	0.2 (0.01)	0.1 (0.00)	0.2 (0.01)	1.9 (0.07)	2.4 (0.09)	3.7 (0.15)	295.1 (11.61)
Source: National Meteorology and Hydrology Service of Peru
