= Tambogrande =

Coordinates: 4.9272°S 80.3526°W

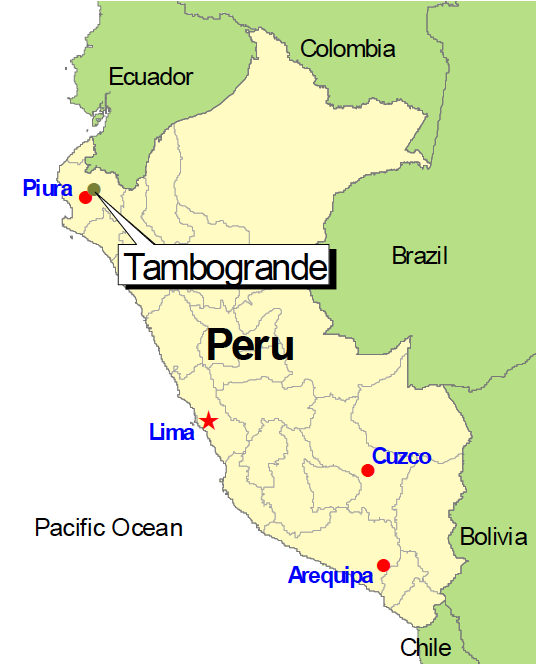
Tambogrande on a map of Peru

Tambogrande is a small town in the Piura Province of the Piura Region in northwestern Peru. One of many small towns chosen as a site for mining development during Peru's mining boom in 1999, Tambogrande achieved prominence for successfully opposing the Manhattan Minerals mining development in the area.

== Demographics ==
Compared with other regions, Tambogrande has some significant advantages, including access to water and its location near the port of Paita. The city's main industry is the production of lemons and mangoes on the fertile land that surrounds the town, producing almost 40% of lemons in Peru and employing 65% of the population in its agricultural industry. 70,000 inhabitants occupy the region, and 16,000 inhabitants live in the town. Although there is no data that reports the poverty rate in Tambogrande, it is reported that in cities along the rural coastal area of Peru— such as Tambogrande—64% of inhabitants live on less than a dollar a day.

== History ==
In 1996, Manhattan Minerals, a Canadian mining company, bought the mineral rights below the town and had found a large copper and gold deposit, from which Manhattan Minerals sought to "extract $1 billion USD worth of minerals". Upon this discovery, the Canadian mining company made a formal proposal to the Peruvian government, which would require the displacement of thousands and involve some harmful environmental risks to the town. The Peruvian government agreed to the proposal to mine the 10,000 hectares of land in Tambogrande for four years.

Despite the promise of jobs and improved infrastructure, the population balked at the proposal. The community did not want to see the town replaced with a kilometer-wide pit because they were concerned that the mining operation could generate enough pollution to destroy the region's agriculture and limited water supply.

An unprecedented protest resulted, led by local leaders of the town and the local Roman Catholic Church as well as international NGOs. In 2002, in a referendum, organized by the NGOs, on the fate of the mining project—"No" or "Yes"—1.28% of the population voted in favor of it. The government would acknowledge the legitimacy of the project and called for Manhattan Minerals to end all operations.

=== Town Concerns ===
"En Piura somos agricultores. (Con la minería) podríamos ver cómo todo sería destruido para siempre: el suelo, el agua, la cosecha." This farmer from Tambogrande says that in Piura, they are all farmers; with mining, it could bring great destruction to the soil, the ground, the water, and the harvest. He captures the residents’ sentiments toward the proposed mining project. Agriculture not only was their main source of revenue, but it also represented their way of life, their culture, and their identity as people of Tambogrande. A mining project would force them to leave in parts of the region, leaving a place they knew as a home for so many decades.

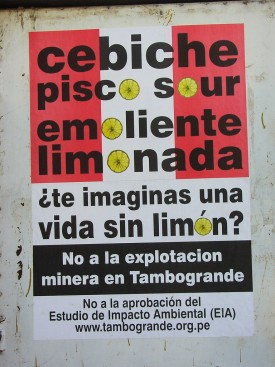
Mine protest poster in Tambogrande.

Several mining projects in Peru such as Yanacocha, La Oroya, Cerro de Pasco and Huarmey have experienced immense environmental damage. There were some cases "of heavy pollution and human intoxication due to accidentals or mismanagement of private or state mining enterprises." Residents are concerned that this could happen to Tambogrande and cause "irreversible damage."

Piura Life and Agriculture and various NGOs partnered together to form some counterarguments against the Canadian mining company's claims that it would cause little to no environmental damage. They stated that the mining project could cause deforestation because of the immense amount of water needed to mine, pollution that may affect the water supply, and nearby rivers, such as El Niño and Piura, that could be consummated. They also stated that farming production would suffer because of the environmental effects incurred. They deemed these environmental risks "too high to be acceptable." Skeptical about the environmental study of the project the government would produce, Oxfam commissioned its own report and came to the same, aforementioned conclusions and described how the government's methodology and approach was wrong. Concerns were also raised about the government's neutrality in the course of dispute between Tambogrande and Manhattan Minerals, as the government owned 25% of Manhattan Minerals.

=== Manhattan Minerals push ===
"Our company has a concrete proposal for development in Tambogrande. It's a proposal with three concrete social and economic aspects that will resolve many of the problems affecting thousands of children and adults in Tambogrande," said Americo Villafuerte, the president of Manhattan Minerals, to the BBC in 2003 explaining how this mining project would improve the lives of the people in Tambogrande. This would be the "narrative" that the Canadian mining company pushed in the public dialogue. It commissioned a report that studied the impact of the mining project and the economic situation in Tambogrande, in an attempt to demonstrate to the public to support it. In its report, the company noted the low standard of living compared to others parts of Peru, the degradation of the soil, the median income and infant mortality rate, which all suggested there needed to be a change in Tambogrande. This change, as the report would point out, would be mining, which would dramatically change Tambogrande's economy positively. The mining project would bring more foreign investment not just to this region, but to the country as a whole. Manhattan Minerals promised it would provide housing to the people who lose their houses and jobs so it would minimize any negative effects on the residents.

=== NGO involvement ===
Protesters formed the Tambogrande Defense Front ("The Front") to garner more support among the people and to organize themselves and be unified in their direction and opposition against Manhattan Minerals. It was composed of local leaders of Tambogrande. The Front was limited, however, its outreach, organization, and resources as it was only composed of the farmers and residents. Though, with partnering with non-governmental organizations (NGOs), their voices were amplified, and the NGOs each played their different roles in the organization. Some provided financial assistance and their contacts around the world, and others helped the community strategize their future steps as they oppose the mining project. They all strengthened this "narrative" that the mining project would only bring destruction to Tambogrande's environment and identity and way of life. Some organizations that were a part of this coalition were OXFAM, Conacami, Piura Life and Agriculture, CREA Pueblo, the local Catholic Church, and some NGO environmental groups such as the Mineral Policy Center and Friends of the Earth from Costa Rica and Ecuador.

The National Confederation of Communities Affected by Mining of Peru (CONACAMI) organized "up to million people" in protesting the "mining boom since the 1990s" because these mining companies, they believed, would exploit the mining resources of "Peruvian peasant communities" and pose a great danger to their health and well-being for generations. In partnership with the community, CONACAMI launched a campaign "under the slogan 'without limes there is no ceviche. CONACAMI helped relay information back to farmers from the Front.

OXFAM, an organization dedicated to eradicating poverty, helped pushed the narrative further. It examined the governmental process that accompanied mining projects such as an environmental study. Before OXFAM joined, few were aware that such a study existed, and OXFAM noted some of the flaws associated with the study and commissioned its own to give its own analysis of the project which laid out the environmental risks and the conflicts that previous countries have had with mining. It shared this knowledge with residents and international organizations that would come forth and oppose the mining project. As one member said "Sin las ONG habría sido difícil que [los tambograndinos] se opongan a él. No tenían ex- periencia, la mayor parte de ellos apenas alcanzó a acabar educación primaria." Without them, he says, it would have been much difficult for them to organize against a big corporation like Manhattan Mineral. Most of the members had a primary education, he says, which would only help them to a certain point. With their help, however, it enabled them to focus on their voices and spread their message and narrative. Because of the success in Tambogrande, the community's success in preventing the mining project would inspire other waves of protests throughout Peru.

== Future of mining of Peru ==
Peru still remains a hot spot for mining developments, having one of the largest gold deposits in the world. Mining makes up 29% of all revenue in Peru, and the mining industry wields great power in Peru.

The Economist argues there is a path forward for sustainable development in Latin America and for mining corporations to work together with communities, and these corporations deserve more credit than critics give them. It notes that the poverty rate in Peru has reduced gradually with newfound development, and if mining corporations model Gold Field's practices, both the corporation and the people will benefit from cooperation. In the case of Tambogrande, it seems Manhattan Minerals did not model of Gold Field's practices or engage the community with their work which could have built trust between them and the community.

Different actors in these mining development projects in Peru offer different perspectives. The Economist writes that Gold Field's plans to start a new mining project in Yanacocha provoked massive protests in 2004, but they were ultimately successful in garnering support for their project because Gold Fields ensured it "listen[ed] more than talk and ensure[ed] that living standards improve for people in the surrounding area."
