= Las Lomas District =

Las Lomas
- District
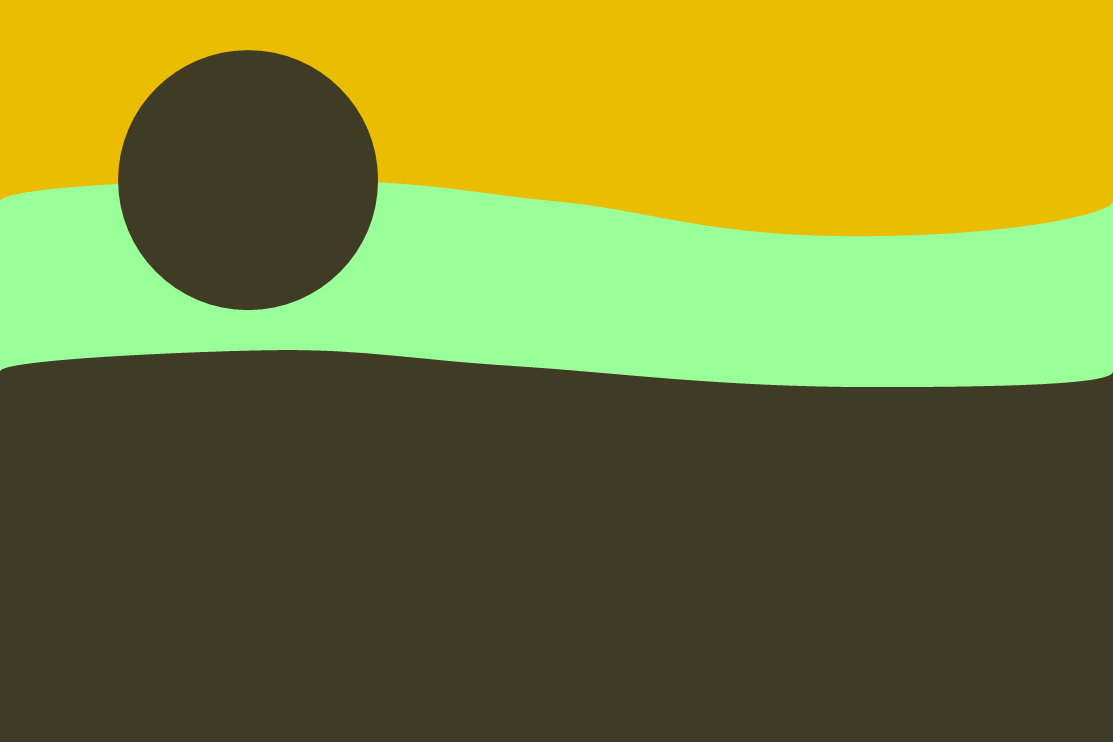
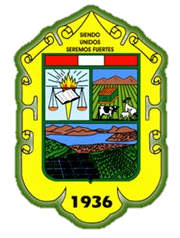
- Flag Coat of arms
- Interactive map of Las Lomas
- Coordinates: 4°41′21″S 80°12′52″W
- Country: Peru
- Region: Piura
- Province: Piura
- Founded: April 3, 1936
- Capital: Las Lomas

Government
  - Mayor: Santos Neira Simbala (2015–2018)

Area
  - Total: 522.47 km^{2} (201.73 sq mi)
- Elevation: 236 m (774 ft)

Population (2005 census)
  - Total: 26,547
  - Density: 50.811/km^{2} (131.60/sq mi)
- Time zone: UTC-5 (PET)
- UBIGEO: 200111
- Website: Municipalidad Distrital de Las Lomas

Las Lomas District is one of ten districts of the province Piura in Peru.

== Climate ==
Climate data for Partidor, Las Lomas, elevation 218 m (715 ft), (1991–2020)
Month	Jan	Feb	Mar	Apr	May	Jun	Jul	Aug	Sep	Oct	Nov	Dec	Year
Mean daily maximum °C (°F)	33.2 (91.8)	32.9 (91.2)	32.7 (90.9)	32.1 (89.8)	30.8 (87.4)	29.5 (85.1)	29.5 (85.1)	30.1 (86.2)	31.2 (88.2)	31.2 (88.2)	31.6 (88.9)	32.5 (90.5)	31.4 (88.6)
Mean daily minimum °C (°F)	21.6 (70.9)	22.6 (72.7)	22.4 (72.3)	21.3 (70.3)	19.5 (67.1)	18.0 (64.4)	17.0 (62.6)	16.7 (62.1)	16.5 (61.7)	17.1 (62.8)	17.9 (64.2)	19.6 (67.3)	19.2 (66.5)
Average precipitation mm (inches)	48.7 (1.92)	141.9 (5.59)	183.7 (7.23)	51.5 (2.03)	6.7 (0.26)	1.2 (0.05)	0.2 (0.01)	0.1 (0.00)	0.2 (0.01)	1.5 (0.06)	2.2 (0.09)	18.4 (0.72)	456.3 (17.97)
Source: National Meteorology and Hydrology Service of Peru
