= Catacaos =

- Town
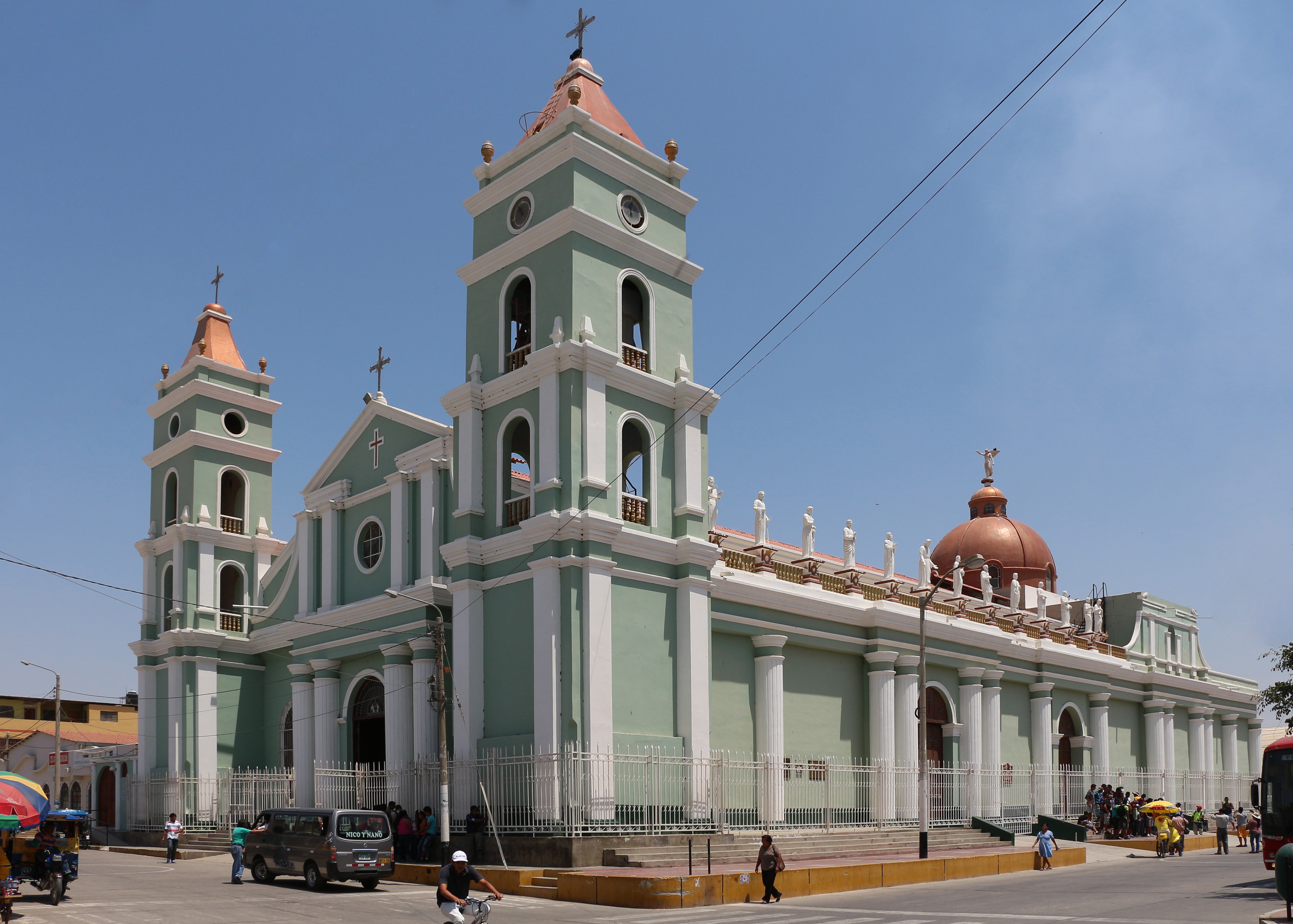
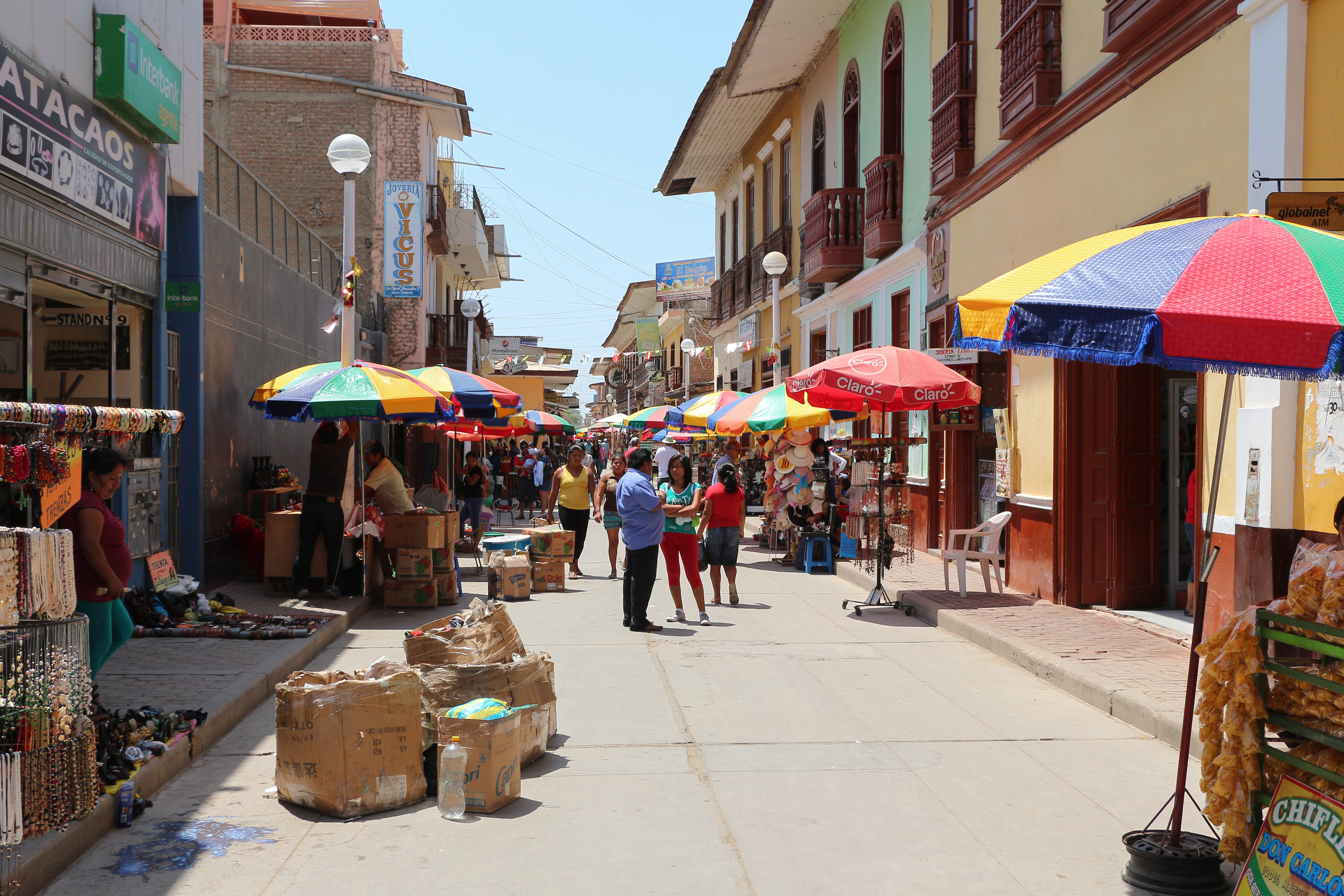
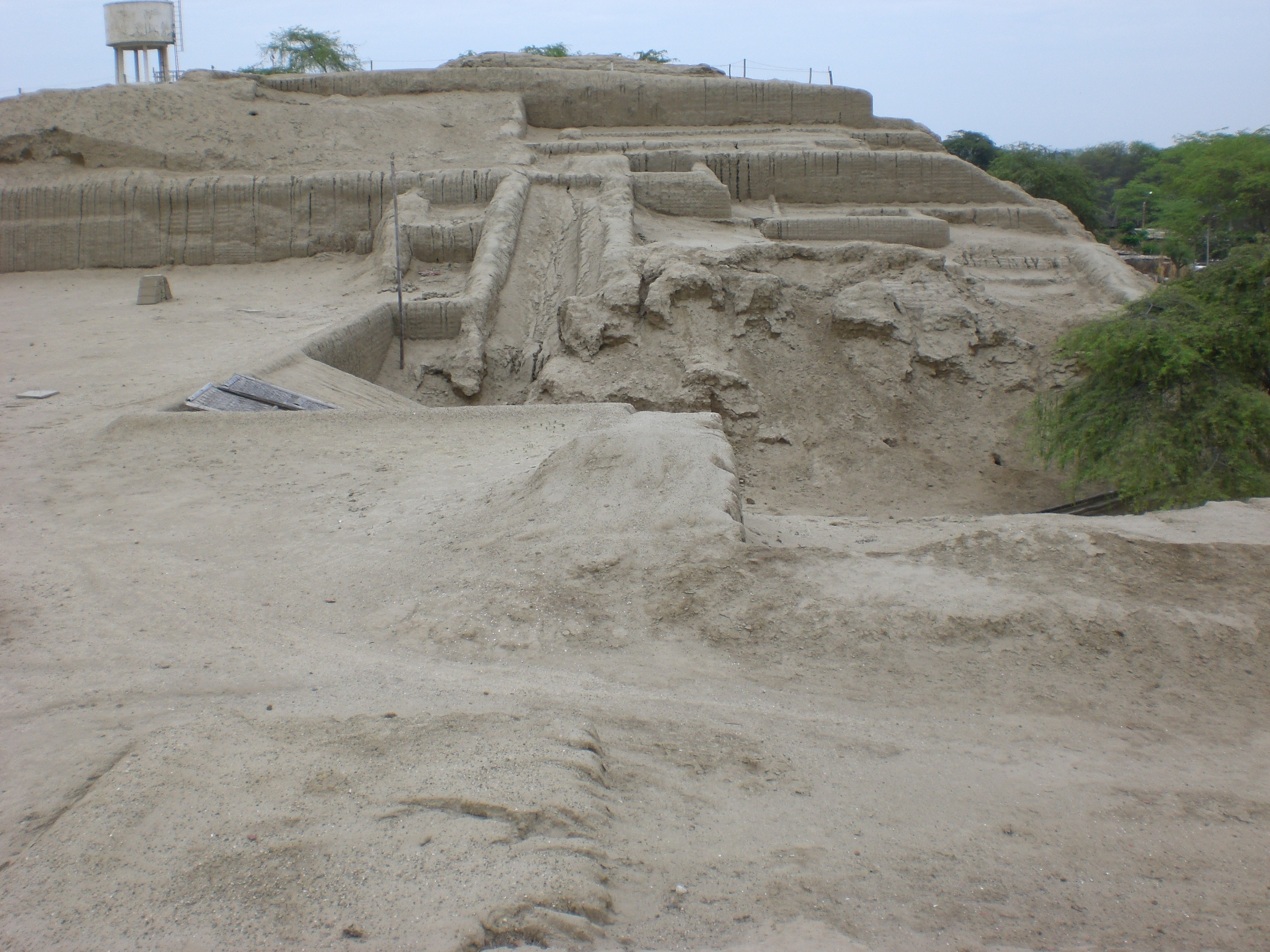
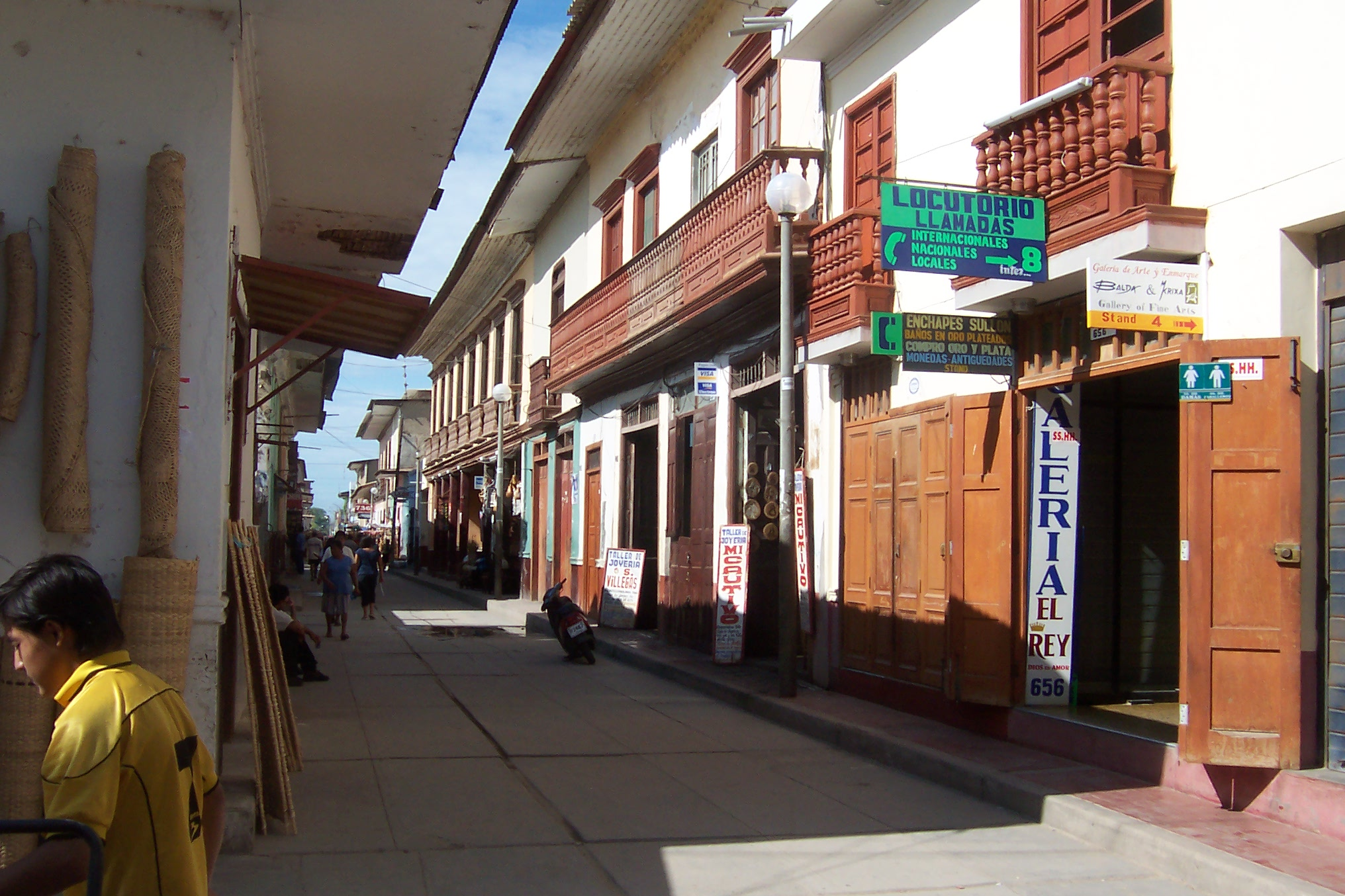
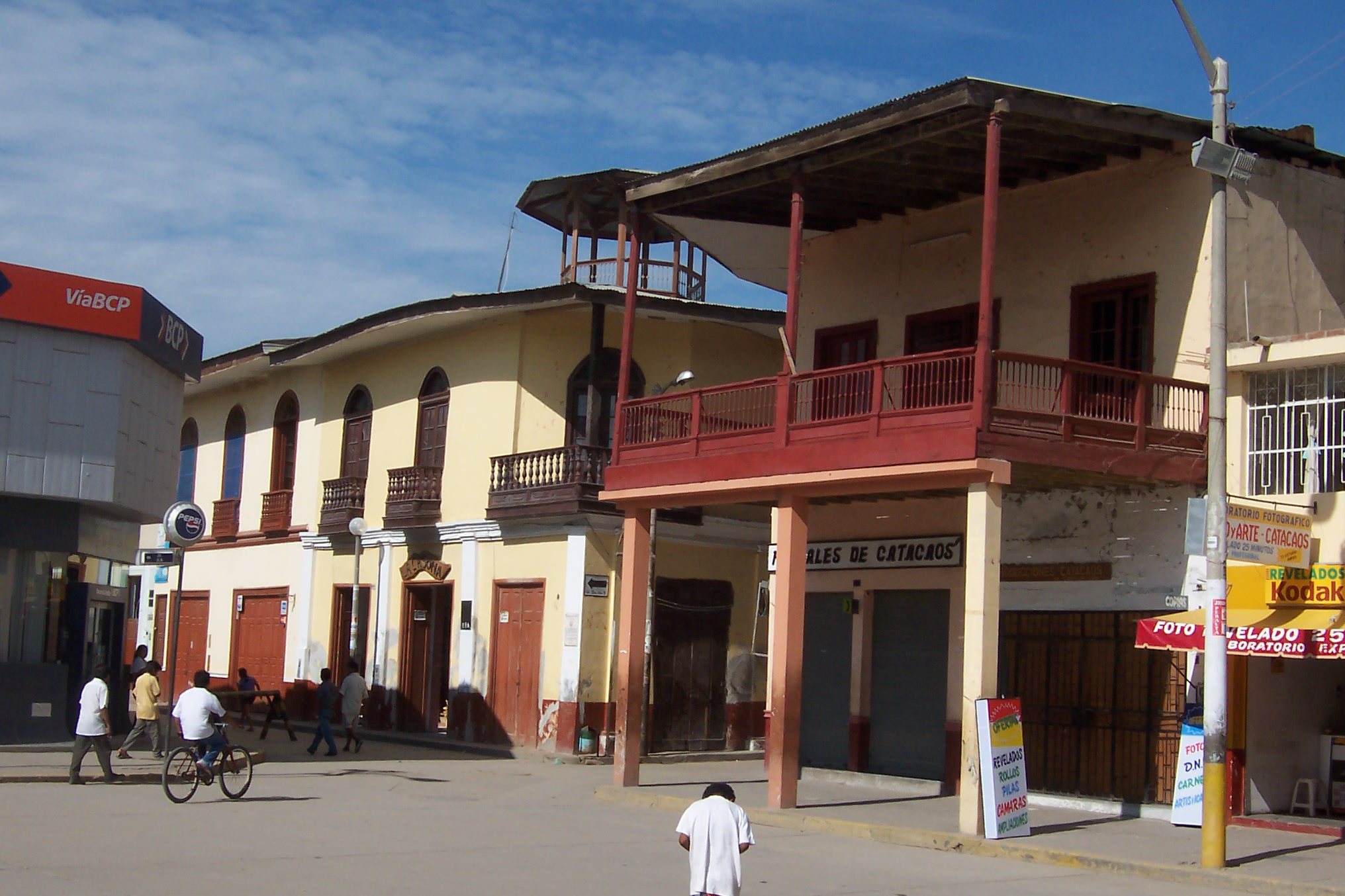
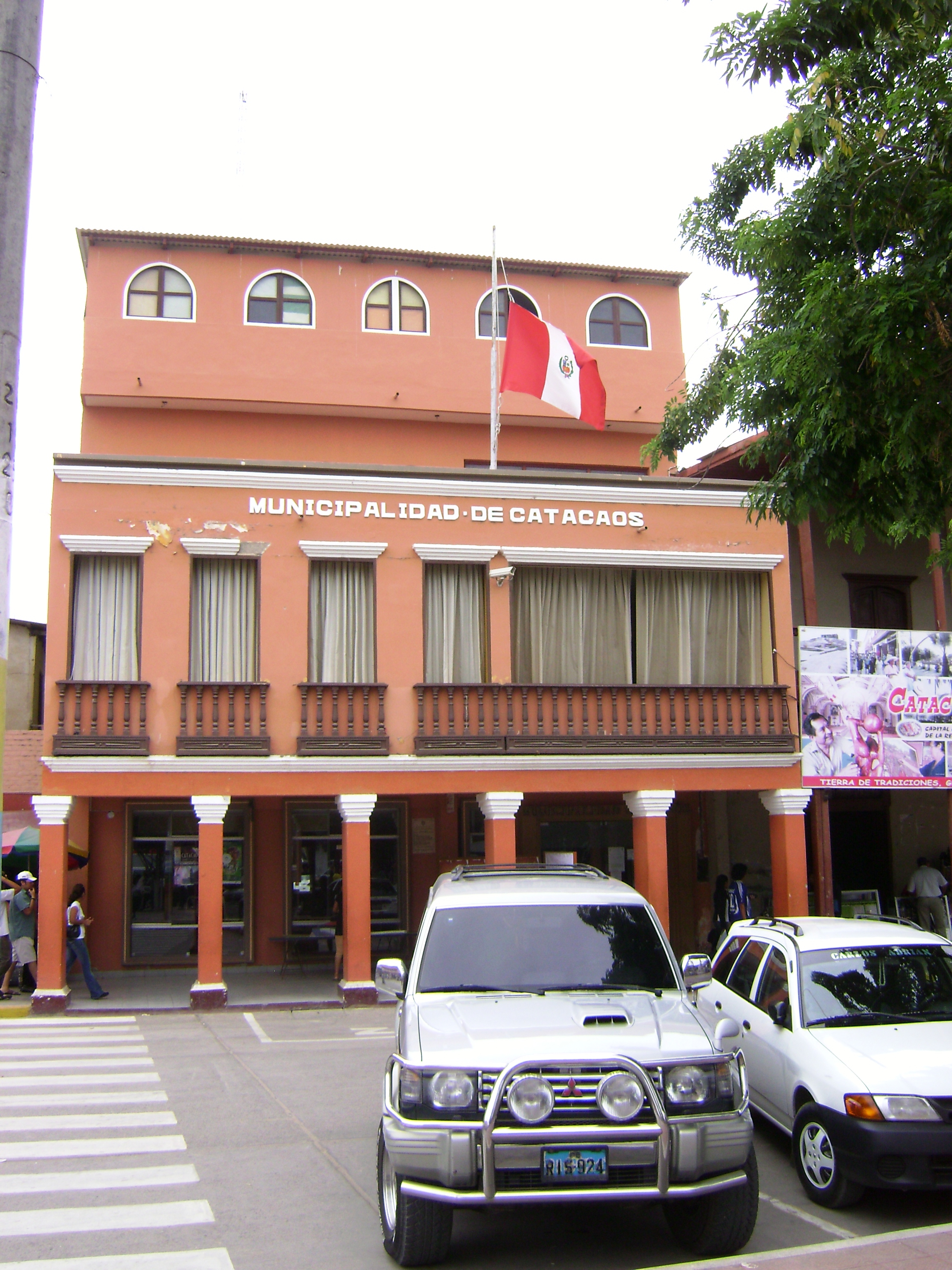

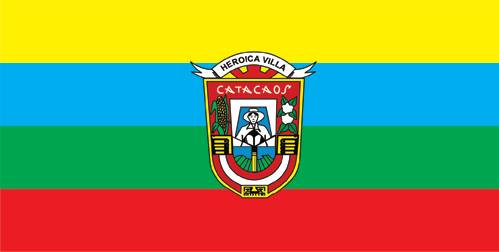
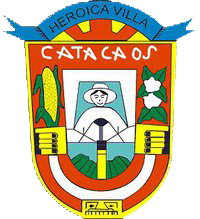
- Flag Coat of arms

- Location within Peru
- Coordinates: 5°15′55″S 80°40′30″W
- Country: Peru
- Region: Piura
- Province: Piura
- District: Catacaos

Government
  - Mayor: Jose Luis Martin Muñoz Vera

Area
  - Total: 2,565.78 km^{2} (990.65 sq mi)
- Elevation: 28 m (92 ft)

Population (2017)
  - Total: 75,870
  - Estimate (2015): 70,590
  - Density: 29.57/km^{2} (76.59/sq mi)
- Website: www.municatacaos.gob.pe/

Catacaos is a town in the Piura Province, Piura Region, Peru. It is known for its gastronomy and crafts (or souvenirs).

The town was severely damaged by flash floods in March 2017 when the Piura River rose by 1.8 m (5.9 ft) and burst its banks.

== Climate ==
Climate data for Catacaos (San Miguel), elevation 24 m (79 ft), (1991–2020)
Month	Jan	Feb	Mar	Apr	May	Jun	Jul	Aug	Sep	Oct	Nov	Dec	Year
Mean daily maximum °C (°F)	33.9 (93.0)	34.6 (94.3)	34.4 (93.9)	32.9 (91.2)	30.7 (87.3)	28.9 (84.0)	28.1 (82.6)	28.3 (82.9)	29.2 (84.6)	29.6 (85.3)	30.4 (86.7)	32.1 (89.8)	31.1 (88.0)
Mean daily minimum °C (°F)	21.2 (70.2)	22.5 (72.5)	22.3 (72.1)	20.7 (69.3)	19.0 (66.2)	17.6 (63.7)	16.6 (61.9)	16.5 (61.7)	16.6 (61.9)	17.1 (62.8)	17.5 (63.5)	19.1 (66.4)	18.9 (66.0)
Average precipitation mm (inches)	18.1 (0.71)	29.8 (1.17)	49.9 (1.96)	15.3 (0.60)	1.0 (0.04)	0.2 (0.01)	0.1 (0.00)	0.0 (0.0)	0.1 (0.00)	0.4 (0.02)	0.5 (0.02)	5.8 (0.23)	121.2 (4.76)
Source: National Meteorology and Hydrology Service of Peru

== Notable people ==
- Judith Westphalen, painter
