= Salitral District, Sullana =

Coordinates: 4.8574°S 80.6812°W

Salitral
- District
- Interactive map of Salitral
- Country: Peru
- Region: Piura
- Province: Sullana
- Founded: June 29, 1946
- Capital: Salitral

Government
  - Mayor: Nazario Molina Correa

Area
  - Total: 28.27 km^{2} (10.92 sq mi)
- Elevation: 60 m (200 ft)

Population (2005 census)
  - Total: 5,892
  - Density: 208.4/km^{2} (539.8/sq mi)
- Time zone: UTC-5 (PET)
- UBIGEO: 200608

Salitral District is one of eight districts of the province Sullana in Peru.
