= El Tallán District =

El Tallán
- District
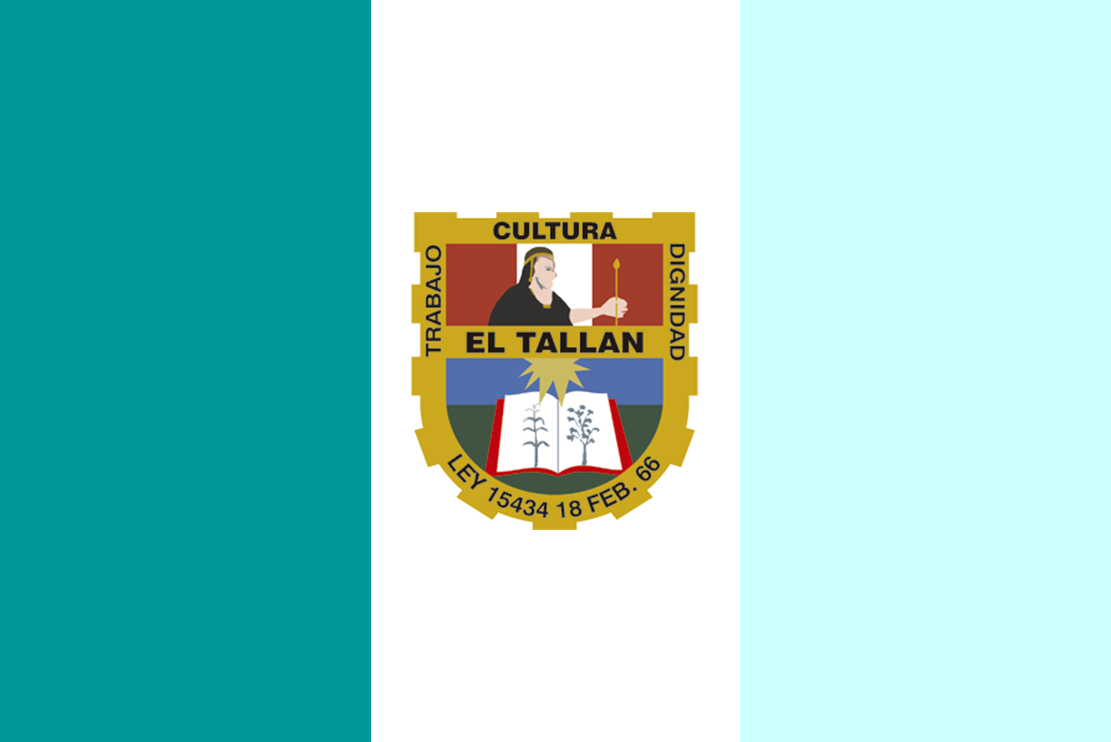
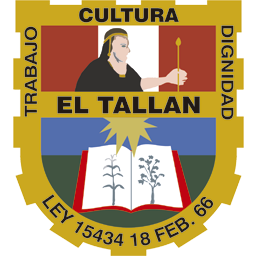
- Flag Coat of arms
- Interactive map of El Tallán
- Coordinates: 5°26′20″S 80°36′49″W
- Country: Peru
- Region: Piura
- Province: Piura
- Founded: February 19, 1965
- Capital: Sinchao

Government
  - Mayor: Leonardo Macalupu Zapata (2019–2022)

Area
  - Total: 116.52 km^{2} (44.99 sq mi)
- Elevation: 23 m (75 ft)

Population (2005 census)
  - Total: 4,934
  - Density: 42.34/km^{2} (109.7/sq mi)
- Time zone: UTC-5 (PET)
- UBIGEO: 200108
- Website: Municipalidad Distrital de El Tallán

El Tallán District is one of ten districts of the province Piura in Peru. The district was created by the law Ley N° 15434 of February 19, 1965 during the first government of Peruvian President Fernando Belaúnde.
