= Piura mangroves =

Ecoregion (WWF)

Piura mangroves San Pedro de Vice mangroves
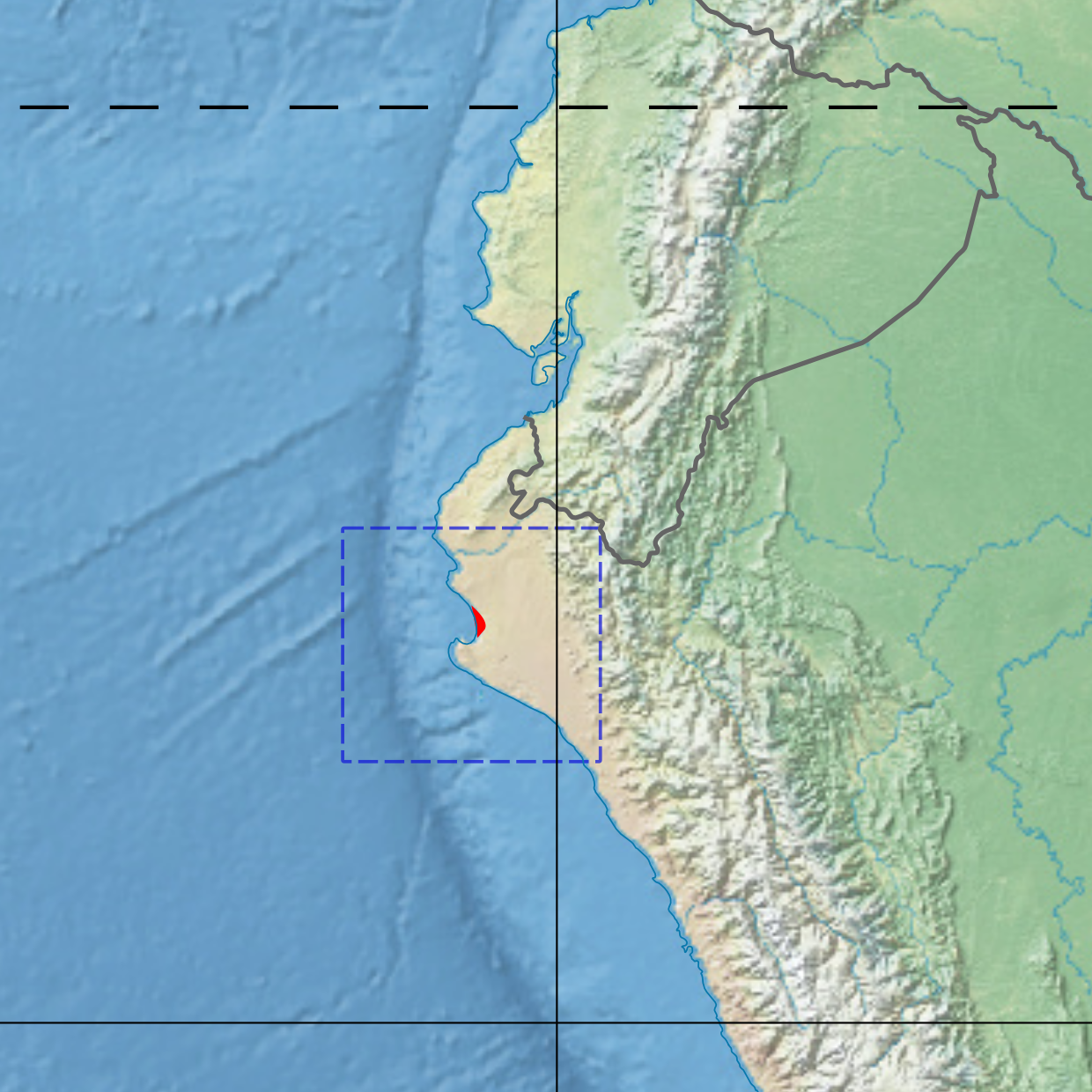
- Ecoregion territory (in red)

Ecology
- Realm: Neotropic
- Biome: Mangroves

Geography
- Area: 129 km^{2} (50 sq mi)
- Country: Peru
- Department: Piura
- Coordinates: 5.54°S 80.87°W

The Piura mangroves ecoregion (WWF ID:NT1429) covers a very small (129 km2) mangrove site on the Piura River Delta, on the Pacific Ocean in northwestern Peru. This small mangrove site is at the northern tip of the Sechura Desert. The climate is normally semi-arid (under 100 mm/year of precipitation), but cn be much wetter in El Nino years. The area is a RAMSAR wetland of international importance "Manglares de San Pedro de Vice"(San Pedro de Vice mangroves), and is an important stopover for migratory birds.

== Location and description ==
The ecoregion covers the fan-shaped delta of the Piura River Delta, from the village of San Pedro in the north to the village of Mata Caballo in the south, a distance of about 20 km. The ecoregion reaches up-river to the local town of Sechura, and the mangroves are entirely surrounded inland by the Sechura Desert ecoregion. Much of the mangrove wooded areas are along the canals and lagoons behind the barrier beach. The terrain is low mudflats and coastal dunes around the mangroves.

== Climate ==
The climate of the ecoregion is Hot desert climate (Köppen climate classification (BWh)). This climate features stable air and high pressure aloft, producing a hot, arid desert. Hot-month temperatures typically average 29–35 °C (84–95 °F).

== Flora and fauna ==
The characteristic tree species in the ecoregion are black mangrove (Avicennia germinans) and white mangrove (Laguncularia racemosa). Coastal dunes support seashore saltgrass (Distichlis spicata) and saltbush (Cryptocarpus pyriformis).

In 2006, photographic record was made of the near-threatened Pampas cat (Leopardus pajeros) in the mangroves near San Pedro.
