= Miguel Checa District =

Miguel Checa
- District
- Location within Peru
- Coordinates: 04°54′08″S 80°48′55″W
- Country: Peru
- Region: Piura
- Province: Sullana
- Founded: 10 November 1950
- Capital: Sojo

Government
  - Mayor: Pedro Miguel Zapata Socola

Area
  - Total: 450.3 km^{2} (173.9 sq mi)
- Elevation: 70 m (230 ft)

Population (2005 census)
  - Total: 7,209
  - Density: 16.01/km^{2} (41.46/sq mi)
- Time zone: UTC-5 (PET)
- UBIGEO: 200606

Miguel Checa District is one of eight districts of the province Sullana in Peru. It was created by law on 10 November 1950 by the government of President Manuel A. Odría. The administrative center of the district is the village of Sojo which is approximately 15 kilometres (9 mi) west of the town of Sullana on the Paita Highway.

Of interest in Miguel Checa District are the archaeological site and huaca "La Mariposa", and the colonial mansion "Casa de Sojo". The district was named after Miguel Checa who built the "Casa de Sojo" in 1910.
