= La Arena =

La Arena may refer to:

- La Arena District, Peru
- La Arena, Los Pozos District, Panama
- La Arena, Chitré District, Panama

== See also ==
- San Juan de La Arena
- Paso de la Arena
