= Sullana District =

Coordinates: 4.8901°S 80.6874°W

Sullana
- District
- Interactive map of Sullana
- Country: Peru
- Region: Piura
- Province: Sullana
- Founded: October 8, 1840
- Capital: Sullana

Government
  - Mayor: Edward Power Saldaña Sánchez

Area
  - Total: 488.01 km^{2} (188.42 sq mi)
- Elevation: 60 m (200 ft)

Population (2017)
  - Total: 169,335
  - Density: 346.99/km^{2} (898.70/sq mi)
- Time zone: UTC-5 (PET)
- UBIGEO: 200601

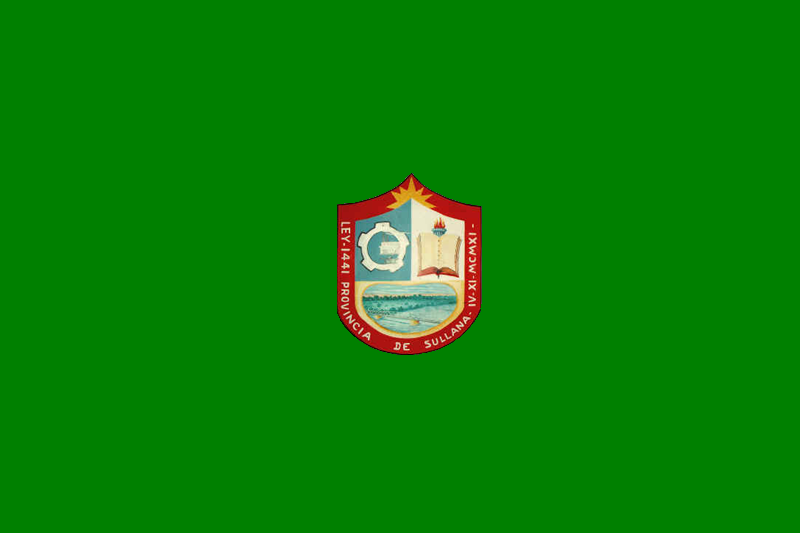

Sullana District is one of eight districts of the province Sullana in Peru.
