= Marcavelica District =

Marcavelica
- District
- Location within Peru
- Coordinates: 04°52′54″S 80°42′12″W
- Country: Peru
- Region: Piura
- Province: Sullana
- Founded: March 25, 1952
- Capital: Marcavelica

Government
  - Mayor: Segundo Teodoro Floreano Ruiz

Area
  - Total: 1,687.98 km^{2} (651.73 sq mi)
- Elevation: 48 m (157 ft)

Population (2005 census)
  - Total: 25,391
  - Density: 15.042/km^{2} (38.959/sq mi)
- Time zone: UTC-5 (PET)
- UBIGEO: 200605

Marcavelica District is one of eight districts of the province Sullana in Peru. It was created by law on 25 March 1952 by the government of President Manuel A. Odría.

The headquarters of one of the two dedicated hunting areas in Peru is located in Marcavelica District. Known as "El Coto de Caza el Angolo", it was formerly, in the 1970s, the estates and cattle ranch of Calixto Romero. Today it is part of the Northwest Peru Biosphere Reserve. Consisting of some 650 square kilometres (251 sq mi), the area is quite mountainous with deep ravines. The area is covered in dry forests, as the area has a low rainfall, but it is subject to heavy mists. Among the animals in the hunting reserve are whitetail deer, red deer, puma, peccary, sechuran fox, pampas cat, and anteaters. Birds native to the area include the condor, king vulture, hawks, canary partridges, pigeons of various kinds, and numerous song birds.

== Climate ==
Climate data for Mallares, Marcavelica, elevation 44 m (144 ft), (1991–2020)
| Month | Jan | Feb | Mar | Apr | May | Jun | Jul | Aug | Sep | Oct | Nov | Dec | Year |
|---|---|---|---|---|---|---|---|---|---|---|---|---|---|
| Mean daily maximum °C (°F) | 34.5 (94.1) | 35.0 (95.0) | 34.9 (94.8) | 34.1 (93.4) | 32.1 (89.8) | 30.2 (86.4) | 29.6 (85.3) | 29.8 (85.6) | 30.6 (87.1) | 30.9 (87.6) | 31.5 (88.7) | 33.1 (91.6) | 32.2 (90.0) |
| Mean daily minimum °C (°F) | 21.7 (71.1) | 23.0 (73.4) | 22.9 (73.2) | 21.6 (70.9) | 19.8 (67.6) | 18.6 (65.5) | 17.7 (63.9) | 17.4 (63.3) | 17.4 (63.3) | 17.7 (63.9) | 18.2 (64.8) | 19.7 (67.5) | 19.6 (67.4) |
| Average precipitation mm (inches) | 24.6 (0.97) | 49.9 (1.96) | 78.1 (3.07) | 21.6 (0.85) | 4.1 (0.16) | 0.4 (0.02) | 0.2 (0.01) | 0.0 (0.0) | 0.1 (0.00) | 1.0 (0.04) | 1.1 (0.04) | 9.4 (0.37) | 190.5 (7.49) |
Source: National Meteorology and Hydrology Service of Peru
