= Castilla District =

Castilla
- District
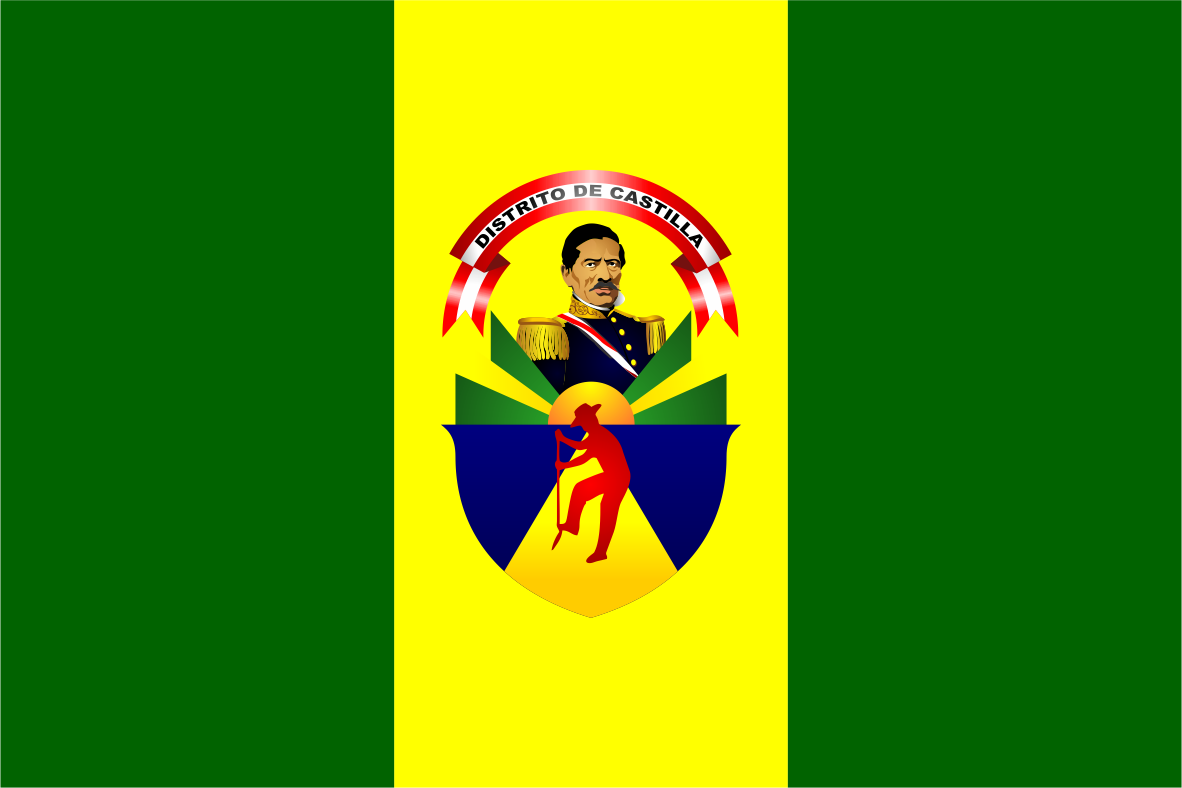
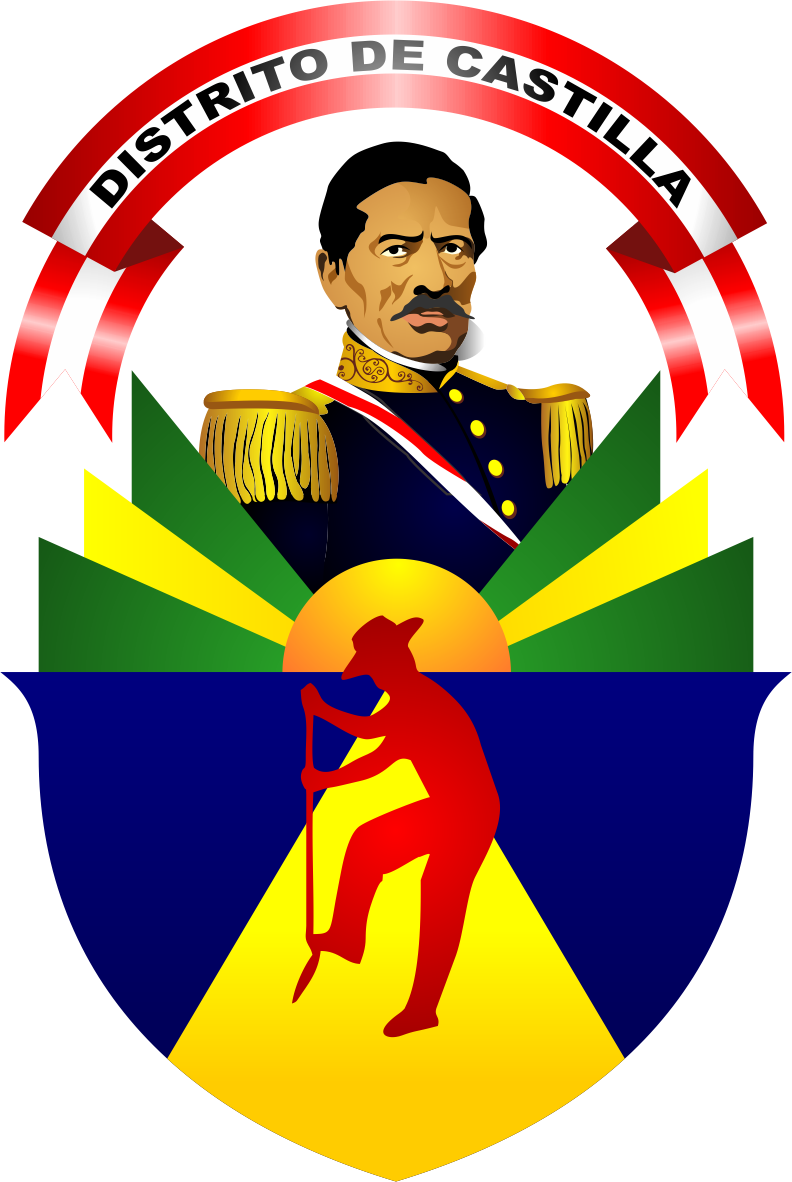
- Flag Coat of arms
- Interactive map of Castilla
- Coordinates: 5°07′47″S 80°30′52″W
- Country: Peru
- Region: Piura
- Province: Piura
- Founded: March 30, 1861
- Capital: Castilla

Government
  - Mayor: José Elías Aguilar Silva (2019–2021)

Area
  - Total: 662.23 km^{2} (255.69 sq mi)
- Elevation: 30 m (98 ft)

Population (2005 census)
  - Total: 120,766
  - Density: 182.36/km^{2} (472.32/sq mi)
- Time zone: UTC-5 (PET)
- UBIGEO: 200104
- Website: municastilla.gob.pe

Castilla District is one of ten districts of the province Piura in Peru. The district was created in 1861 during the presidency of Ramón Castilla. In 2007, it had a population of 120,000.

== Climate ==
Climate data for Miraflores, Castilla, elevation 34 m (112 ft), (1991–2020)
| Month | Jan | Feb | Mar | Apr | May | Jun | Jul | Aug | Sep | Oct | Nov | Dec | Year |
|---|---|---|---|---|---|---|---|---|---|---|---|---|---|
| Mean daily maximum °C (°F) | 33.6 (92.5) | 34.3 (93.7) | 34.3 (93.7) | 32.7 (90.9) | 30.6 (87.1) | 28.5 (83.3) | 27.7 (81.9) | 28.0 (82.4) | 28.9 (84.0) | 29.4 (84.9) | 30.2 (86.4) | 31.8 (89.2) | 30.8 (87.5) |
| Mean daily minimum °C (°F) | 22.2 (72.0) | 23.4 (74.1) | 23.2 (73.8) | 21.6 (70.9) | 20.0 (68.0) | 18.6 (65.5) | 17.6 (63.7) | 17.4 (63.3) | 17.5 (63.5) | 17.9 (64.2) | 18.5 (65.3) | 20.2 (68.4) | 19.8 (67.7) |
| Average precipitation mm (inches) | 31.9 (1.26) | 39.2 (1.54) | 61.3 (2.41) | 18.5 (0.73) | 1.8 (0.07) | 0.2 (0.01) | 0.2 (0.01) | 0.0 (0.0) | 0.1 (0.00) | 0.5 (0.02) | 0.8 (0.03) | 7.9 (0.31) | 162.4 (6.39) |
Source: National Meteorology and Hydrology Service of Peru
