= Conacami =

Peruvian indigenous rights organization

CONACAMI (National Confederation of Peruvian Communities Affected by Mining)
- Founded: October 1999
- Founders: Communities Affected by Mining
- Purpose: Indigenous peoples
- Location: Jirón Huamachuco 1681, Jesús María, Lima 11, Peru
- Region served: Peru
- Website: http://www.conacami.pe

The National Confederation of Peruvian Communities Affected by Mining (CONACAMI, in Spanish: Confederación Nacional de Comunidades del Perú Afectadas por la Minería) is a Peruvian indigenous rights organization with a focus on defending the rights of indigenous peoples living in communities that are close to (future) large scale mining projects. The organization tries to protect them against the potential negative impacts of mining. Of the 6000 communities in Peru, 3200 experience negative effects of the extractive industries. CONACAMI is a national organization and gives support to the 19 regional organizations. These handle the specific conflicts between indigenous communities and mining companies.

== Mission and vision ==
CONACAMI aimes at protecting indigenous peoples and their communities against the negative impacts of extractive industries. These impacts include environmental ones, such as water pollution with mercury, cyanide and heavy metals, air pollution, including lead poisoning, solid waste, and others. There are also social impacts which include among others the violation of human rights in the decision-making process, immigration of job seekers into the community and workers' health problems and fatal accidents. Thirdly, cultural impacts are possible. These include the loss of or change in traditional livelihoods, the destruction of or damage to cultural heritage and the disturbance of sacred natural sites, mainly due to open pit mining. Former leader of CONACAMI, Miguel Palacín, explained this final impact in an interview in 2005 as: "To open a pit in the highest mountain, the Apu, is like tearing a hole in the Cathedral of Lima to the Catholics" Besides the described negative impacts, there are also potential positive aspects of mining, which include new job opportunities, improved infrastructure and services and different social, environmental or cultural heritage programs set up by the mining companies and/or regional authorities. But these potential positive impacts on the local communities often remain promises which aren not fulfilled. The affected communities invoke the ILO Convention no. 169 to argue that they have the right of Free, Prior and Informed Consent (FPIC) to activities that affect their lives.

CONACAMI envisions the Andean idea of el buen vivir (in Quechua: sumaq kawsay), translated as living well, as opposed to the Western concept of neoliberalism. It calls for a way of living in which people, communities and the environment are in harmony and respect each other, in which not only the rights of man count, but also those of Mother Earth (Pachamama). One person or group of people should not aim for profit at the expense of another, in which the other could be another person or another group of people as well as the environment.

== History ==
CONACAMI was founded in October 1999 at a meeting with representatives of over 1200 Peruvian communities. Because of the neoliberalism of Fujimori's (1990–2000) politics, mining activities grew without paying attention to the local communities. The negative impacts of the mining activities on these indigenous communities were large and in 1997 and 1998 they started their resistance, which eventually resulted in the foundation of CONACAMI. In its first years of existence, the organization gathered knowledge about the problems, got the situation on the political agenda and had its first grand success in Tambogrande, where after years of resistance the mining project was cancelled by the Peruvian government as a result of a referendum.

In the beginning, the organization proposed bilateral communication with the mining companies, but at the Second National Congress in 2003 it was decided to take a different approach. The organization now rejects mining and neoliberal practices as a whole. Furthermore, they turned into an indigenous confederation and are now focussing on the defense of indigenous peoples' rights.

During the years it became clear that the conflicts were too numerous which made it impossible for CONACAMI to coordinate all the conflicts. Therefore, they decided on the Third National Congress (2005) to focus on giving advice, knowledge and tools to the regional organization in order to give them the capacity to solve the problems on a regional level.

CONACAMI started with globalization through affiliations with other indigenous organizations such as the Bolivian organization CONAMAQ and ECUARUNARI from Ecuador. Among these organization knowledge and experiences were shared. In July 2006 CONACAMI cofounded CAOI (Coordinadora Andina de Organizaciones Indígenas) in which multiple indigenous organizations from Colombia, Ecuador, Peru, Bolivia and Chile are brought together. In October 2009 CONACAMI celebrated its 10th anniversary and organized together with its affiliated organizations the Global Minga in Defense of Mother Earth and Her Peoples (12–16 October).

== National board ==
Members of the National board of CONACAMI (February 2011):

- Magdiel Carrión Pintado: President
- Luis Siveroni Morales: Vice president

Secretaries:

- Nora Melchor Cohaila: Land and water protection
- Pablo Salas Charca: Institutional development
- Víctor Rodríguez Lauret: Environmental monitoring
- Gioconda Baca Vargas and Hilda Huamán Huamaní: Records and files
- Felipe Cortez Zeballos: Economy
- Gumercinda Neira Cornejo: Women
- Benito Calixto Guzmán: International and foreign relations
- Roberto Martínez Pérez: Training and culture
- Odilón Huaraya Labra: Press and publicity
- Carlos Candiotti: Human rights

== Regional organizations ==
CONACAMI is an umbrella organization in which 19 regional organizations are organized. The majority is called CORECAMI (Coordinadora Regional de Comunidades Afectados por la Minería) which makes them recognizable as affiliated with CONACAMI.

=== Northern Peru ===
- FEPROCCA (Federación Provincial de Comunidades de la Provincia de Ayabaca) – Piura
- Frente de Defensa del Medio Ambiente de Carmen de la Frontera – Piura
- CORECAMI – Ancash

=== Central Peru ===
- FERECCNPA (Federación Regional de Comunidades Campesinas y Nativas de Pasco) – Pasco
- CORECAMI – Pasco
- CORECAMI – Junín
- Red Ambiental y Territorial del Valle Dorado de los Andes – Junín
- CREDEMAV (Coordinadora Regional de Defensa del Medio Ambiente y la Vida) del Callao – Lima
- CORECAMI – Oyon
- CORECAMI – Ica
- Comunidad Campesina de Quispillacta – Ayacucho
- CORECAMI – Huancavelica
- CODICAMI – Secclla (Coordinadora Distrital de Comunidades Afectados por la Minería) – Huancavelica

=== Southern Peru ===
- CORECAMI – Apurimac
- CORECAMI – Arequipa
- CORECAMI – Moquegua
- CORECAMI – Cuzco
- CORECAMI – Tacna
- CORECAMI – Puno

== Affiliated organizations ==
- OCMAL: Observatorio de Conflictos Mineros de América Latina (Observatory of mining conflicts in Latin America)
- AIDESEP (Asociación Interétnica de Desarrollo de la Selva Peruana) – Peru Website
- ECUARUNARI (Confederación de Pueblos de la Nacionalidad Kichwa del Ecuador) – Ecuador Website
- CONAMAQ (Consejo Nacional de Ayllus y Markas del Qullasuyum) – Bolivia Website
- CAOI (Coordinadora Andina de Organizaciones Indígenas) Website
- LABOR Peru Website
- Friends of the Earth International
- Oxfam – United States
- 11.11.11 – Belgium Website
- IBIS – Denmark Website
