= Veintiséis de Octubre District =

Veintiséis de Octubre
- District
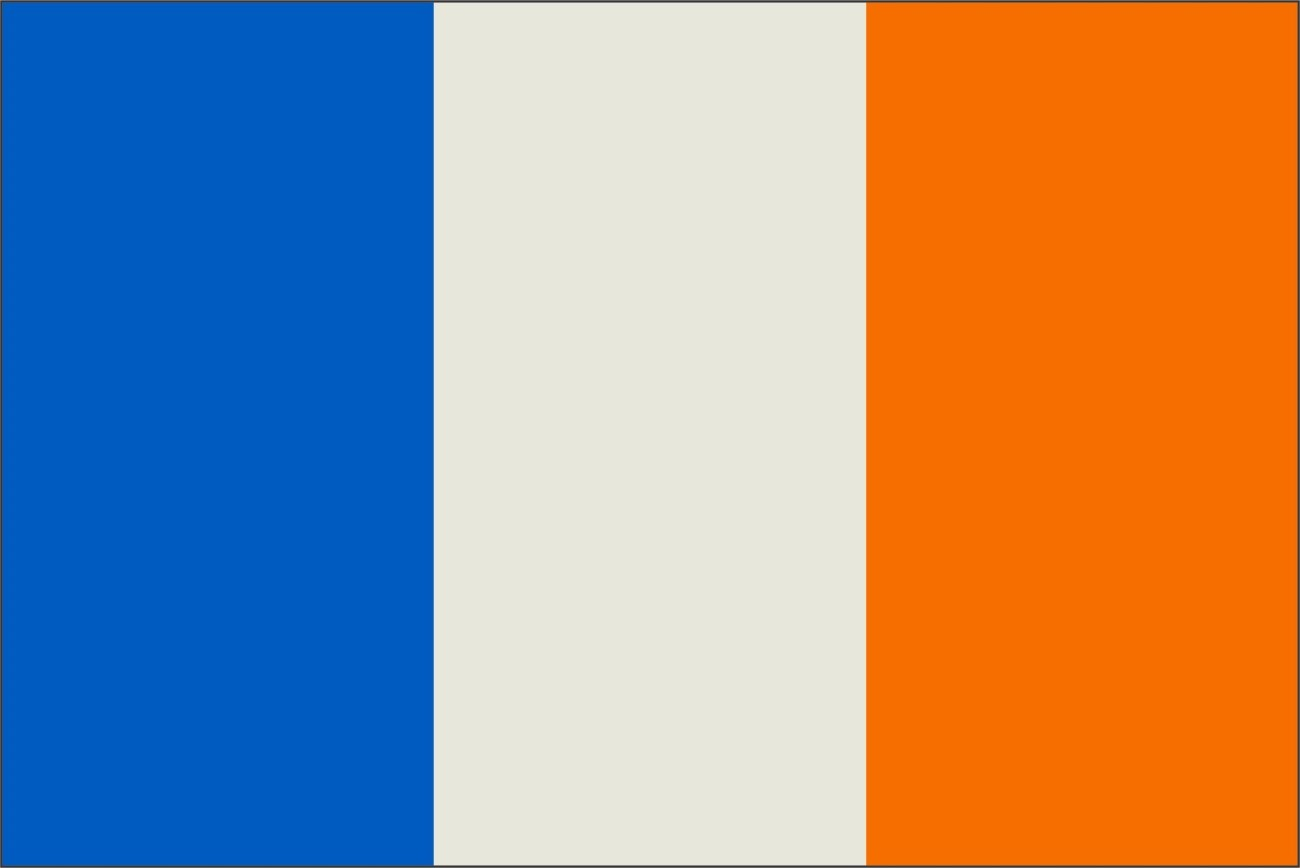
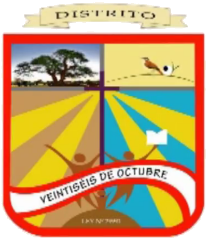
- Flag Coat of arms

- Map of the Piura Province
- Coordinates: 5°10′37″S 80°40′51″W
- Country: Peru
- Region: Piura
- Province: Piura
- Founded: January 15, 2013
- Capital: San Martín
- Time zone: UTC-5 (PET)
- Website: Municipalidad Distrital Veintiséis de Octubre

Veintiséis de Octubre District is one of the districts of the province Piura in Peru. On February 2, 2013, the president of Peru Ollanta Humala Tasso promulgated the law Ley 29991 of territorial demarcation and organization of the province of Piura, which in its second article created the district Veintiséis de Octubre.
