= Lancones District =

Coordinates: 4.6408°S 80.5487°W

Lancones
- District
- Interactive map of Lancones
- Country: Peru
- Region: Piura
- Province: Sullana
- Founded: December 3, 1917
- Capital: Lancones

Area
  - Total: 2,189.35 km^{2} (845.31 sq mi)
- Elevation: 120 m (390 ft)

Population (2005 census)
  - Total: 13,302
  - Density: 6.0758/km^{2} (15.736/sq mi)
- Time zone: UTC-5 (PET)
- UBIGEO: 200604

Lancones District is one of eight districts of the province Sullana in Peru.

In 2016, the Lancones District recorded a temperature of 39.8 °C (103.6 °F), which is the joint highest temperature to have ever been recorded in Peru along with Chulucanas.

== Climate ==
Climate data for Lancones, elevation 136 m (446 ft), (1991–2020)
Month	Jan	Feb	Mar	Apr	May	Jun	Jul	Aug	Sep	Oct	Nov	Dec	Year
Mean daily maximum °C (°F)	33.8 (92.8)	34.2 (93.6)	33.9 (93.0)	33.5 (92.3)	31.5 (88.7)	29.5 (85.1)	29.0 (84.2)	29.6 (85.3)	30.7 (87.3)	31.1 (88.0)	31.7 (89.1)	32.6 (90.7)	31.8 (89.2)
Mean daily minimum °C (°F)	21.4 (70.5)	22.6 (72.7)	22.3 (72.1)	21.4 (70.5)	19.8 (67.6)	17.7 (63.9)	16.8 (62.2)	16.6 (61.9)	16.8 (62.2)	17.1 (62.8)	17.9 (64.2)	19.3 (66.7)	19.1 (66.4)
Average precipitation mm (inches)	46.7 (1.84)	102.2 (4.02)	149.5 (5.89)	47.3 (1.86)	6.9 (0.27)	0.2 (0.01)	0.0 (0.0)	0.0 (0.0)	0.0 (0.0)	1.3 (0.05)	0.4 (0.02)	21.3 (0.84)	375.8 (14.8)
Source: National Meteorology and Hydrology Service of Peru
