= La Arena District =

La Arena
- District
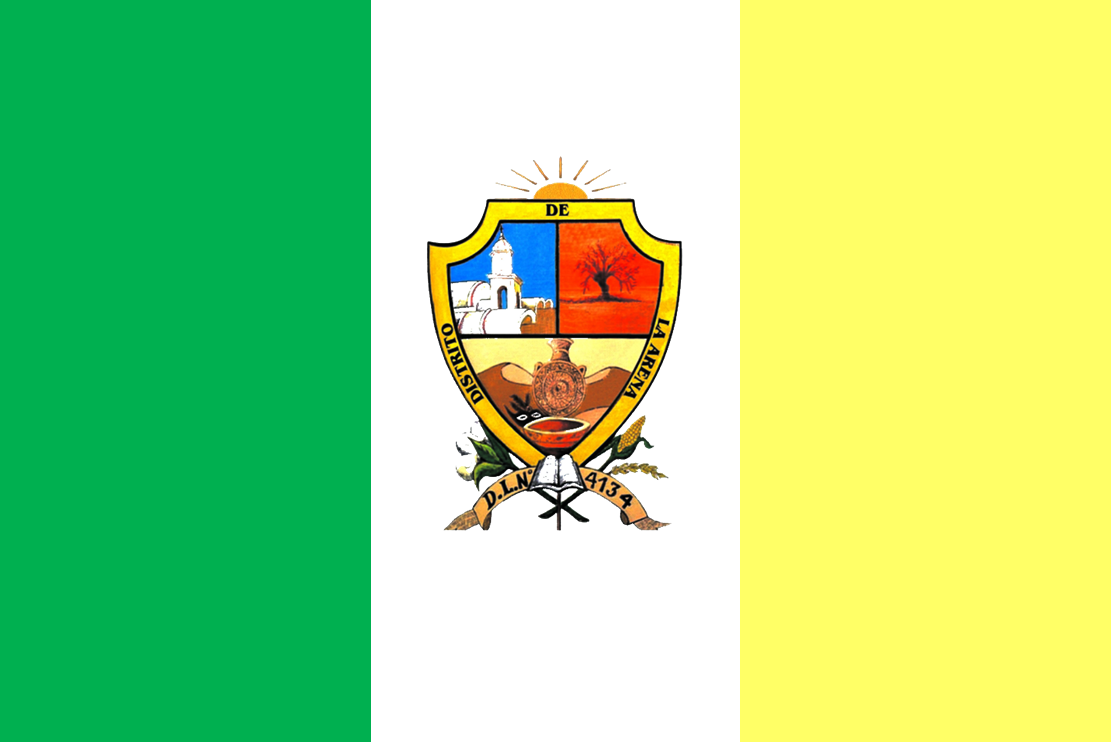
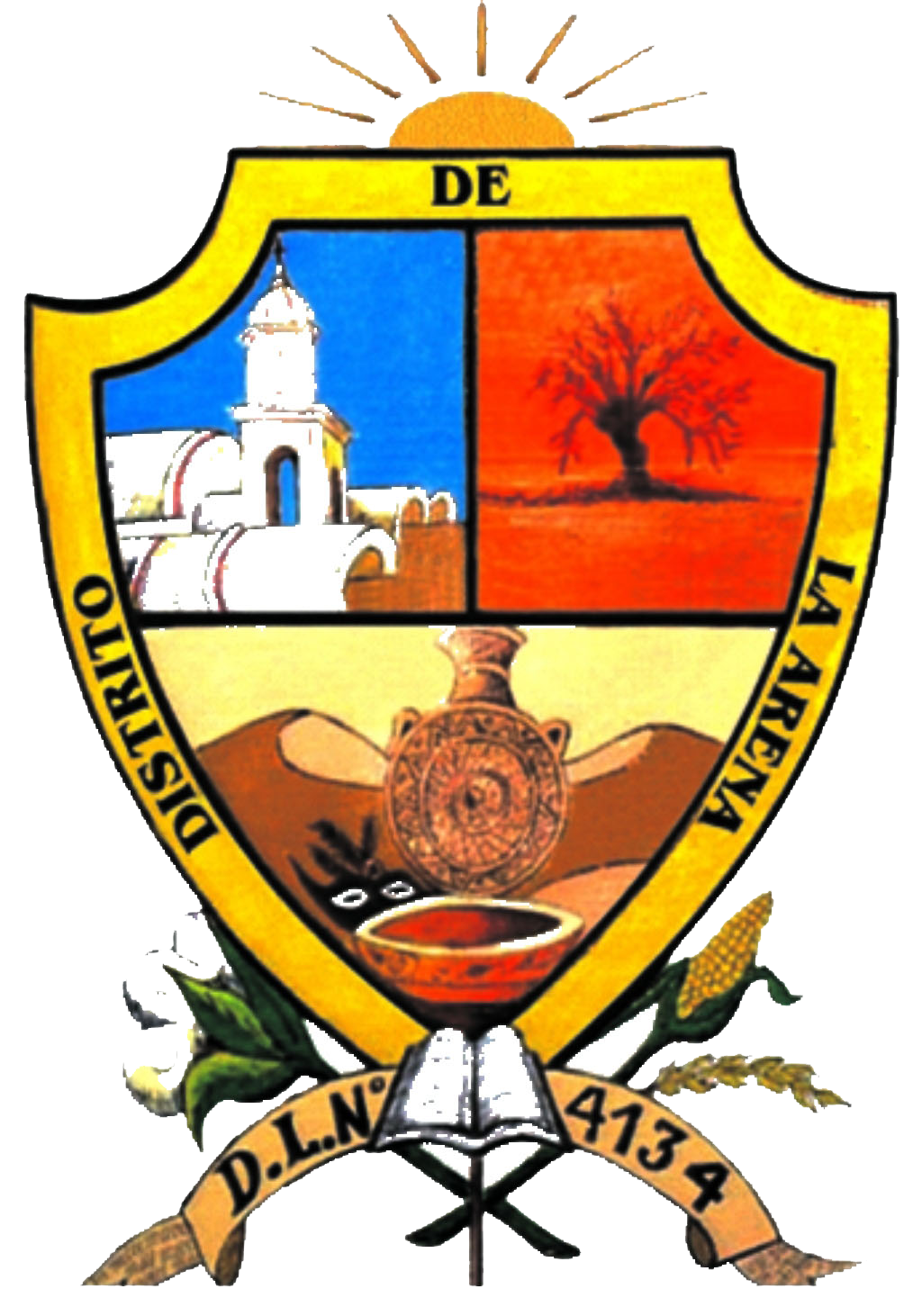
- Flag Coat of arms
- Interactive map of La Arena
- Coordinates: 5°18′39″S 80°45′47″W
- Country: Peru
- Region: Piura
- Province: Piura
- Founded: June 15, 1920
- Capital: La Arena

Government
  - Mayor: Harrinson Talledo (2015–2018)

Area
  - Total: 160.22 km^{2} (61.86 sq mi)
- Elevation: 29 m (95 ft)

Population (2005 census)
  - Total: 34,110
  - Density: 212.9/km^{2} (551.4/sq mi)
- Time zone: UTC-5 (PET)
- UBIGEO: 200109
- Website: munilaarena.gob.pe

La Arena District is one of ten districts of the province Piura in Peru.
