= Judith Westphalen =

Peruvian painter

- Born: Judith Ortiz Reyes; June 2, 1922; Catacaos, Peru
- Died: December 31, 1976 (aged 54); Rome, Italy
- Occupation: Painter

Judith Westphalen (née Ortiz Reyes; 1922 – 1976) was a Peruvian painter known for her abstract artwork.

== Early life and education ==
Westphalen was born Judith Ortiz Reyes in Catacaos, Piura, in 1922. She earned a doctorate in Literature and Pedagogy at the National University of San Marcos in Lima. She was a self-taught artist.

== Career ==
She began painting in 1944. After participating in a group exhibition in Viña del Mar in 1946, she had her first individual show at the former Sala Bach in Lima the following year.

She lived and worked with her husband, the poet Emilio Adolfo Westphalen, in Lima, New York City, Los Boliches (Spain), Florence, and Rome. Her work was exhibited in Peru, the US, Italy, Chile, Spain, Mexico, and Belgium.

== Death and legacy ==
She died in Rome on December 31, 1976.

A major retrospective of her work was held from June to August 2007 in the Municipal Galleries of Miraflores (Lima). In 2022, the Visual Arts Gallery held an exhibition of her work at the Ccori Wasi Cultural Center commemorating the 100th anniversary of her birth.
