= Cura Mori District =

Cura Mori
- District
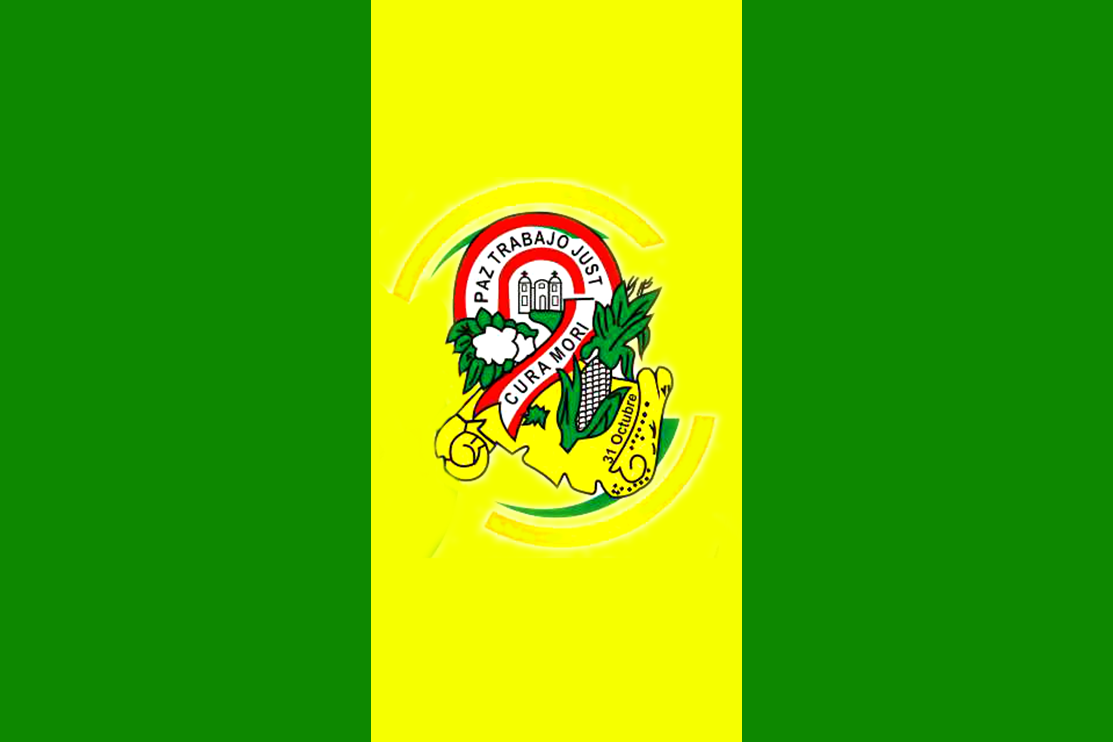
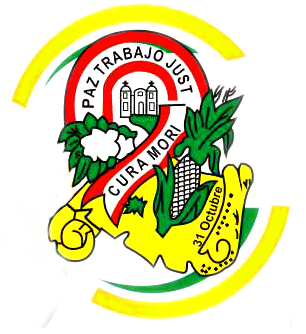
- Flag Coat of arms
- Interactive map of Cura Mori
- Coordinates: 5°21′22″S 80°35′33″W
- Country: Peru
- Region: Piura
- Province: Piura
- Founded: February 19, 1965
- Capital: Cucungara

Government
  - Mayor: Juan Carlos Vílchez Valverde (2019-2022)

Area
  - Total: 197.65 km^{2} (76.31 sq mi)
- Elevation: 27 m (89 ft)

Population (2005 census)
  - Total: 16,545
  - Density: 83.709/km^{2} (216.80/sq mi)
- Time zone: UTC-5 (PET)
- UBIGEO: 200107
- Website: Municipalidad Distrital de Cura Mori

Cura Mori District is one of ten districts of the province Piura in Peru. The district was created by the law Ley N° 15434 of February 19, 1965 during the government of Peruvian President Fernando Belaúnde.
