= Cajunga =

- Town
- Location within Peru
- Coordinates: 5°52′S 79°58′W
- Country: Peru
- Region: Piura Region

Cajunga is a city located in northwestern Peru in the Piura Region.

The official languages are both Spanish and Quechua.
