= Sullana province =

Coordinates: 4°53′24″S 80°40′48″W

Sullana
- Province
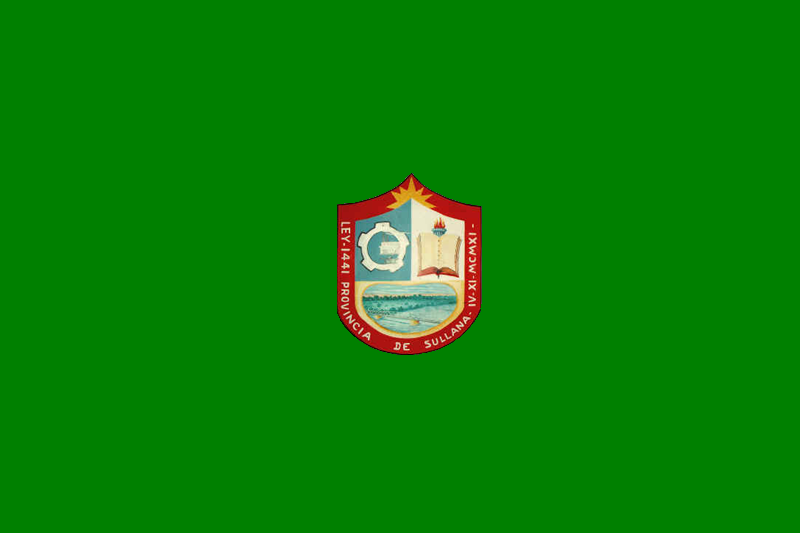
- Flag

- Location of Sullana in the Piura Region
- Country: Peru
- Region: Piura
- Founded: November 4, 1911
- Capital: Sullana

Government
  - Mayor: Edward Power Saldaña Sánchez

Area
  - Total: 5,423.61 km^{2} (2,094.07 sq mi)
- Elevation: 60 m (200 ft)

Population
  - Total: 311,454
  - Density: 57.4256/km^{2} (148.732/sq mi)
- UBIGEO: 2006
- Website: www.munisullana.gob.pe

Sullana is a landlocked province in the Piura Region in northwestern Peru. It is the northernmost province in the Piura Region.

== Boundaries ==
- North: province of Contralmirante Villar (Tumbes Region)
- East: Ecuador, province of Ayabaca
- South: province of Piura
- West: provinces of Paita and Talara

== Political division ==
The province has an area of 5,423.61 square kilometers (2,094.07 sq mi) and is divided into eight districts

- Sullana
- Bellavista
- Marcavelica
- Miguel Checa
- Ignacio Escudero
- Lancones
- Querecotillo
- Salitral

== Population ==
The province has an approximate population of 250,000 residents.

== Capital ==
The capital of the province is the city of Sullana which is the second largest city in the Piura Region.
