= Piura District =

Piura District Distrito de Piura
- District
- Flag Coat of arms
- Interactive map of Piura District
- Coordinates: 5°11′45″S 80°38′00″W
- Country: Peru
- Region: Piura
- Province: Piura
- Founded: 1823
- Capital: Piura

Government
  - Mayor: Juan José Díaz Dios (2019–2022)

Area
  - Total: 330.32 km^{2} (127.54 sq mi)
- Elevation: 29 m (95 ft)

Population (2017)
  - Total: 158,495
  - Density: 479.82/km^{2} (1,242.7/sq mi)
- Time zone: UTC-5 (PET)
- UBIGEO: 200101
- Website: Municipalidad Provincial de Piura

Piura District is one of ten districts of the province Piura in Peru.

== Geography ==
- Piura river

== Authorities ==
=== Mayors ===
- 2019–2022: Juan José Díaz Dios
- 2015–2018: Óscar Raúl Miranda Martino
- 2011–2014: Ruby Consuelo Rodríguez Vda. de Aguilar
- 2007–2010: José Eugenio Aguilar Santisteban

== See also ==
- Administrative divisions of Peru
