= Tallán =

Ancient ethnic group in Peru

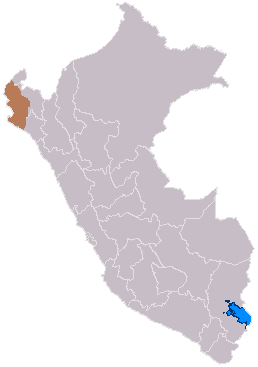
- Map of the Tallán culture in Piura
- Language: Tallán language
- Period: Late Intermediate
- Dates: c. 500 - 1470
- Type site: Narihualá
- Preceded by: Moche, Vicús
- Followed by: Inca Empire

Tallán (or Tacllán, after the use of the taclla, a farming tool) was a conglomerate of ethnic groups with a common origin that settled in the plains of north-western Peru, an ethnos with a matriarchal system. (Due to their possible kinship, the Tumpis, who settled in the current Department of Tumbes, are widely considered one of these ethnic groups.) They had migrated to the coastal plains from the Sierra.

In the beginning the Tallán lived in behetrias, which were simple settlements without a head or an organization, in which all its members were engaged in the same and unique activity, mainly agriculture and fishing. Then through barter with the neighboring partialities they obtained what was necessary to live. This need for others to subsist allowed the Chimúes first and then the Incas to impose their dominion over them. Although due to the short time that elapsed between the Inca conquest (c. 1470) and the arrival of the Spanish (1532) they were not completely assimilated into the empire.

Narihualá (17 km south of Piura) is considered the capital of the Tallán Nation and is the most important architectural evidence of a great monument, both in its size and the prominent platforms of two pyramids. The Narihualá Temple was built as a sanctuary in the honour of the Tacllán god Walac. Huaca El Loro, near Chiclayo, Peru is a Tallán archaeological site, where a 1,000-year-old mummy of a nobleman was discovered.
