= Catacaos District =

Catacaos
- District
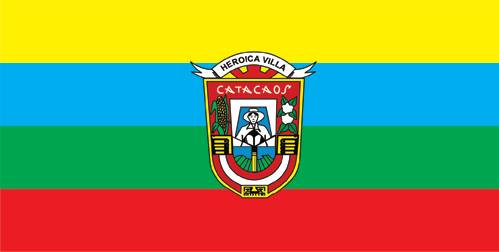
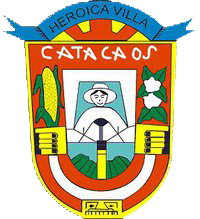
- Flag Coat of arms
- Interactive map of Catacaos
- Country: Peru
- Region: Piura
- Province: Piura
- Capital: Catacaos

Government
  - Mayor: Jose Luis Martin Muñoz Vera

Area
  - Total: 2,565.78 km^{2} (990.65 sq mi)
- Elevation: 23 m (75 ft)

Population (2017)
  - Total: 75,870
  - Density: 29.57/km^{2} (76.59/sq mi)
- Time zone: UTC-5 (PET)
- UBIGEO: 200105
- Website: municatacaos.gob.pe

Catacaos District is one of ten districts of the province Piura in Peru.

== Climate ==
Climate data for San Miguel, Catacaos, elevation 24 m (79 ft), (1991–2020)
| Month | Jan | Feb | Mar | Apr | May | Jun | Jul | Aug | Sep | Oct | Nov | Dec | Year |
|---|---|---|---|---|---|---|---|---|---|---|---|---|---|
| Mean daily maximum °C (°F) | 33.9 (93.0) | 34.6 (94.3) | 34.4 (93.9) | 32.9 (91.2) | 30.7 (87.3) | 28.9 (84.0) | 28.1 (82.6) | 28.3 (82.9) | 29.2 (84.6) | 29.6 (85.3) | 30.4 (86.7) | 32.1 (89.8) | 31.1 (88.0) |
| Mean daily minimum °C (°F) | 21.2 (70.2) | 22.5 (72.5) | 22.3 (72.1) | 20.7 (69.3) | 19.0 (66.2) | 17.6 (63.7) | 16.6 (61.9) | 16.5 (61.7) | 16.6 (61.9) | 17.1 (62.8) | 17.5 (63.5) | 19.1 (66.4) | 18.9 (66.0) |
| Average precipitation mm (inches) | 18.1 (0.71) | 29.8 (1.17) | 49.9 (1.96) | 15.3 (0.60) | 1.0 (0.04) | 0.2 (0.01) | 0.1 (0.00) | 0.0 (0.0) | 0.1 (0.00) | 0.4 (0.02) | 0.5 (0.02) | 5.8 (0.23) | 121.2 (4.76) |
Source: National Meteorology and Hydrology Service of Peru
