= Piura province =

Coordinates: 5°11′36″S 80°37′59″W

Piura
- Province
- Flag Coat of arms

- Location of Piura in the Piura Region
- Country: Peru
- Region: Piura
- Founded: March 20, 1861
- Capital: Piura

Government
  - Mayor: Juan Díaz Dios (2019-2022)

Area
  - Total: 6,211.61 km^{2} (2,398.32 sq mi)
- Elevation: 29 m (95 ft)

Population
  - Total: 642,428
  - Density: 103.424/km^{2} (267.866/sq mi)
- UBIGEO: 2001
- Website: www.munipiura.gob.pe

Piura is a province in the Piura Region in northwestern Peru. Its capital, the city of Piura, is also the regional capital. The province is the most populous in the region as well as its center of economic activity.

== Boundaries ==
- Northeast Sullana Province
- Northwest Ayabaca Province
- East Morropón Province
- Southeast Lambayeque Region
- Southwest Sechura Province
- West Paita Province

== Political division ==
The Piura Province is divided into ten districts (Spanish: distritos, singular: distrito), each of which is headed by a mayor (alcalde). The districts, with their capitals in parentheses, are:

- Piura (Piura), in Piura metropolitan area
- Castilla (Castilla), in Piura metropolitan area
- Veintiséis de Octubre (San Martín), in Piura metropolitan area
- Catacaos (Catacaos), in Piura metropolitan area
- Cura Mori (Cucungará)
- El Tallán (Sinchao)
- La Arena (La Arena)
- La Unión (La Unión)
- Las Lomas (Las Lomas)
- Tambo Grande (Tambo Grande)
