= Piura River =

River in Peru

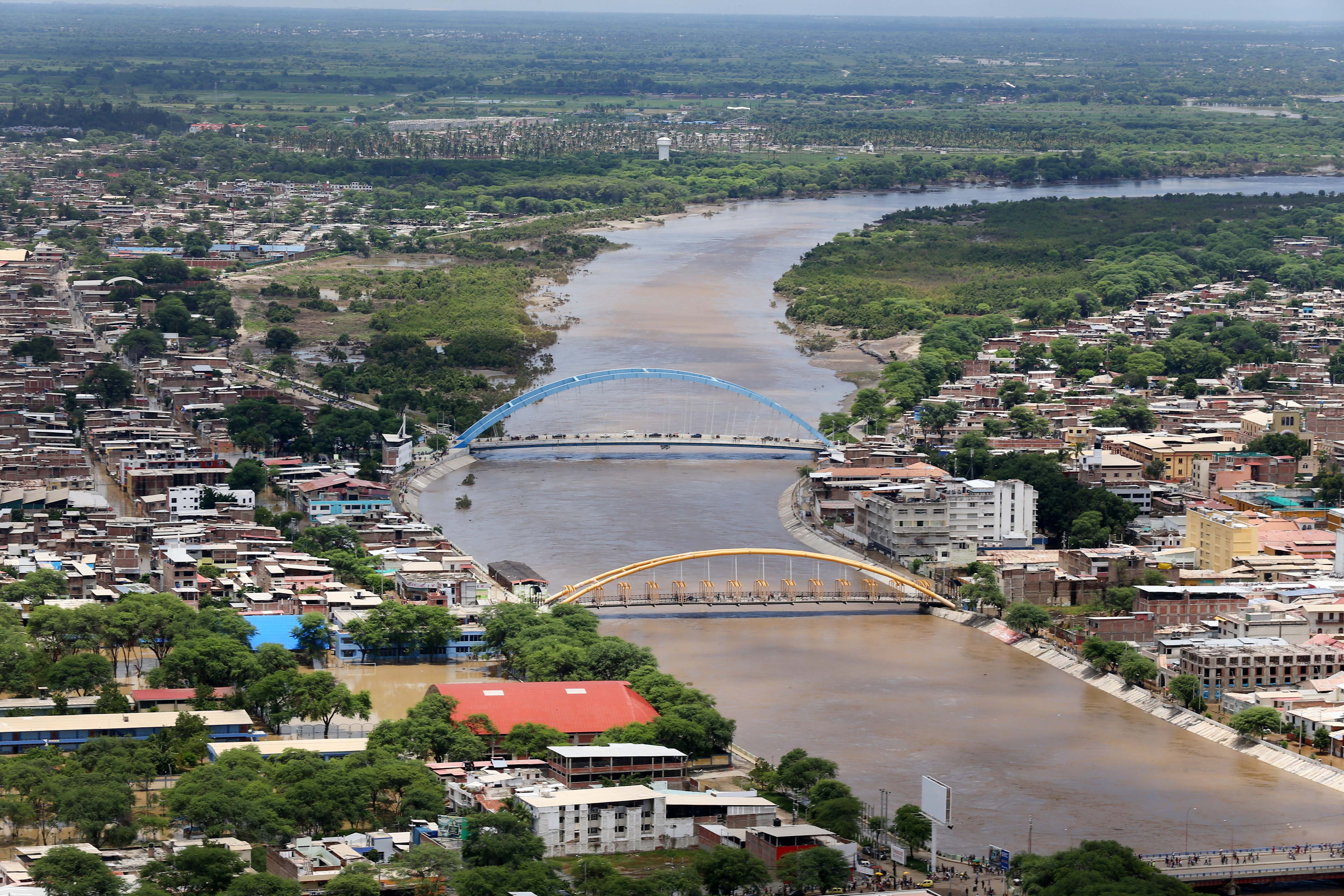
- The Piura River in a flooded state flowing through Piura

- Location of Piura River's mouth in Peru
- Native name: Río Piura (Spanish)

Location
- Region: Piura Region
- Country: Peru

Physical characteristics
- Mouth
  - coordinates: 5°46′20″S 80°52′07″W
- Length: 295 km (183 mi)
- Basin size: 12,216 km^{2} (4,717 mi^{2})

The Piura River is a river in northern Peru. The river flows westward from the Andes to the Pacific Ocean and is susceptible to major flooding. Piura is the largest city along the river's course.

== Course ==
The Piura River has its source in eastern Piura Region near the continental divide of the Andes where the mountainous divide is relatively lower than elsewhere in Peru. The river flows in a northwesterly direction for approximately 150 km (93 mi) through a fertile valley that is a major agricultural region for northern Peru. At Tambo Grande, the river course turns west. The Piura comes within 14 km (8.7 mi) of the Chira River before flowing southerly into the arid Sechura Desert. Through this desert the Piura River provides a rare source of fresh water and creates a strip of arable land in which the city of Piura is located. The Piura River has two mouths at Sechura Bay with its largest discharge at Laguna Ramon. Historically, the Piura River's primary mouth was further north but severe El Niño events in recent decades has diverted much of its flow to the south. The total length of the Piura is approximately 295 km (183 mi) and the river's basin is approximately 12,216 km^{2} (4,717 mi^{2}).

== Flooding ==
The Piura River is susceptible to major flooding as its location is near the fluctuating southern boundary of the Intertropical Convergence Zone. In most years, the ITCZ lies to the north of coastal Peru leading to very arid desert conditions in the lower Piura River basin. During El Niño events, however, the ITCZ will shift further south bringing monsoon-like rains to the desert region. During these times, the usually tame Piura will often break through its banks and cause devastating flooding in the city of Piura and nearby towns.

The Piura experienced major flooding in 1925, 1982-83, 1997-1998, and 2017.
