= Department of Piura =

Department of Peru

Piura
- Department
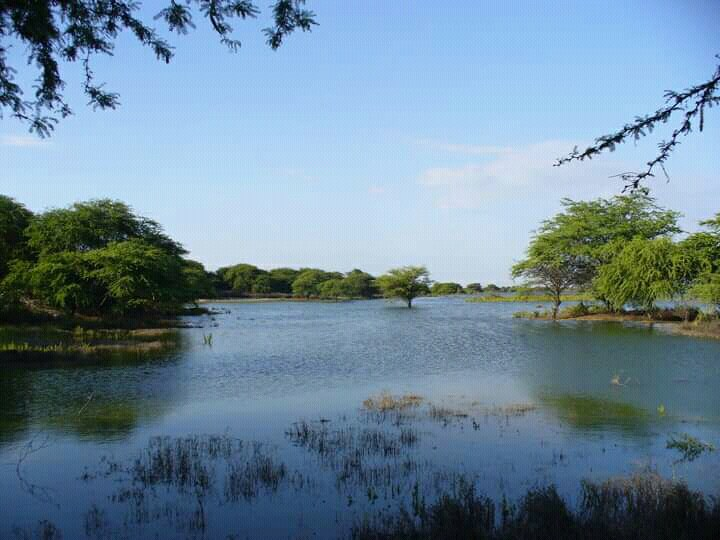
- Ñapique Lagoon

- Flag Coat of arms

- Location of Piura within Peru
- Coordinates: 4.99°S 80.41°W
- Country: Peru
- Capital: Piura
- Provinces: List: Ayabaca; Huancabamba; Morropón; Paita; Piura; Sechura; Sullana; Talara

Government
  - Type: Regional Government
  - Governor: Servando García Correa
  - Senator: Karla Schaefer (FP)

Area
  - Total: 35,892.49 km^{2} (13,858.17 sq mi)
- Elevation (Capital): 29 m (95 ft)
- Highest elevation: 3,023 m (9,918 ft)
- Lowest elevation: −34 m (−112 ft)

Population (2025)
  - Total: 2,115,587
  - Density: 58.94233/km^{2} (152.6599/sq mi)
- Demonym: piurano/a
- UBIGEO: 20
- Dialing code: 073
- ISO 3166 code: PE-PIU
- Principal resources: Petroleum, rice, cotton, lemon
- Poverty rate: 19.1%
- Percentage of Peru's GDP: 3.94%
- Website: www.regionpiura.gob.pe

Piura (Spanish pronunciation: [ˈpjuɾa]) is a department of Peru. Located on the country's northwestern coast, it is known for its tropical and dry beaches. It is the most populous department and region in Peru, its twelfth smallest department, and its fourth-most densely populated department, after Tumbes, La Libertad, and Lambayeque. It is administered by regional government. Its capital is Piura and its largest port cities, Paita and Talara, are also among the most important in Peru.

According to the adjusted 2025 census results, around 2,115,000 people lived in Piura.

== History ==
The country's latest decentralization program is in hiatus after the proposal to merge departments was defeated in the national referendum in October 2005. The referendum held on October 30, 2005, as part of the ongoing decentralization process in Peru, to decide whether the region would merge with the current regions of Lambayeque and Tumbes to create a new Región Norte was defeated.

== Geography ==
The Piura Region is bordered to the north by the Tumbes Region and Ecuador, to the east by Cajamarca Region, to the south by the Lambayeque Region, and to the west by the Pacific Ocean. "Punta Pariñas" in Piura is South America's most western point.

The territory of the Piura Region has many climate variations due to its geographical location. It is just 4 degrees south of the equator, yet receives two ocean currents at the same time: the cold Humboldt Current (13–20 °C; 55–68 °F) and the warm El Niño Current (20–27 °C; 68–81 °F). This makes the Piura Region a land that is both tropical and arid at the same time, The Land where the Tropics meets The Desert

The coast is divided by the Peruvian subtropical desert of Sechura on the south and savanna-like scrub Tumbes–Piura dry forests to the center and north of the region. There are also small valleys of tropical climate, where rice and coconut fields are common, especially around the Piura and Sullana rivers.

There is montane forest (selva alta) as one goes away from the coast onto the sierra. Páramo climates and cooler temperatures appear higher in the sierra.

Topography is smooth in the coast and rough in the Sierra. There are many arid plains in the southern region. The Sechura Desert, located south of the Piura River, is Peru's largest desert and one of the world's few examples of a tropical desert; it borders a tropical terrain to the north. The Bayóvar Depression, which is the lowest point in Peru and all of the Southern Tropics, is located in this desert.

The morphological forms most common in the coast are the dry ravine that suddenly become copious when there are heavy rains, forming tropical dry forests all over. Other features are half-moon shaped dunes, the marine terraces such as those of Máncora, Talara and Lobitos. Valleys have been formed by fluvial terraces of the Chira River and Piura River.

To the east, valleys are more or less deep and have been eroded by rivers forming equatorial tropical-dry-forests. The major peak surpasses 3000 m. The Paso de Porculla, in the southwest of the territory is only 2,138 meters high and is the lowest pass of the Peruvian Andes.

The rivers crossing its territory belong both to the Pacific watershed and to the Amazon Basin. The Chira River is the most important and flows into the Pacific Ocean. The Piura River also flows into the Pacific Ocean although the flow varies greatly with the changing seasons and during severe droughts will dry up.

=== Climate ===
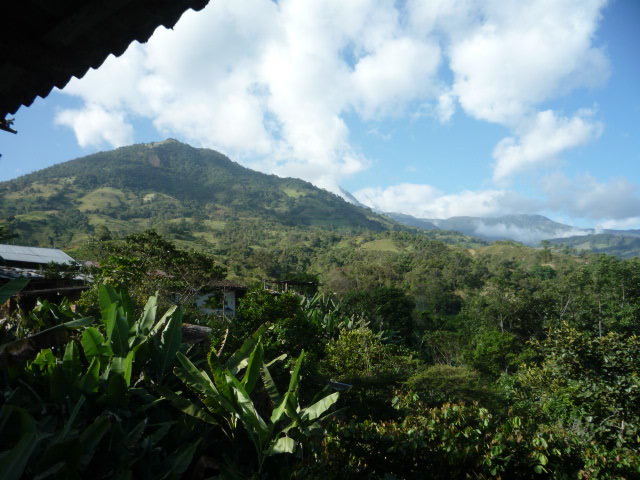
Afternoon in Santo Domingo (Morropón)

The climate is subtropical and tropical savanna in the center and north coast, Semi-arid in the southern coast near Lambayeque Region. Piura has a tropical dry or tropical savanna climate monsoon weather that averages 26 °C (79 °F) throughout the whole year. Pleasant warm winters (June to October) that average between 25 and 28 °C (77 and 82 °F) during the daytime and lows around 16 and 18 °C (61 and 64 °F) during the night.

In 2013 and 2016, Chulucanas and the Lancones District, two places in the Department of Piura, recorded a temperature of 39.8 °C (103.6 °F). This is the highest temperature to have ever been recorded in Peru.

Piura is covered by deserts, tropical valleys, dry equatorial forests, tropical montane climates as you reach between 1000 and 1500 meters, and a humid subtropical sierra climate if you reach over 2,000 meters. The Páramo climate is found in the higher regions of the Sierra.

Rain is scarce from May to November: it rains only from December to April at discontinuous rates due to the influence of the El Niño Current, but every so often, when the El Niño phenomenon arrives, rain is copious and makes the dry ravines become alive, giving rise not only to the impressive forests but to many floods and great landslides. El Niño occurs when ocean waters reach 27 °C (81 °F). When ocean water temperatures elevate 1 or 1.5 degrees Celsius higher than 26 °C (79 °F), the consequence could be catastrophic rains.

Although ocean waters can drop to 19 °C (66 °F) during the dry winter months (May to October), they can also rise to 27 °C (81 °F) during the humid summer months (December to April); this calls for pleasant rains; yet if the temperatures rise 1 or 1.5 °C degrees above that, El Niño is assured.

During the hottest days of summer (December to April), temperatures can reach almost 40 °C (104 °F) inland. During night time, 30s or even high 20s may seem unpleasant, which urge people to go to beach resorts such as Máncora or Colán.

The rest of the months have pleasant summer temperatures in the low 30s and mid 20s °C (77–90 °F).

=== Natural resources and wildlife ===
Piura is a land of unique algarrobo trees, a variety of mesquite similar to the carob, and it is the region with the most equatorial tropical dry forests in the whole Pacific.

These ecoregions carry a unique variety of orchids, birds, reptiles, plants and mammals. Piura is known for the best and oldest lime-lemons in South America as well as South America's finest mango (tropical dry). With Lambayeque, it is the original home of Pima cotton. Piura also produces bananas, coconuts, rice and other fruits as local income.

The "Manglares de San Pedro de Vice" in Sechura Province of Piura are the southernmost mangroves on the Pacific coast of South America.

Its development has been favoured also by the petroleum found in the ocean of Talara Province, fishing is blessed by two ocean currents, silver mines are common and the current Bayovar Deposits are present as well.

== History ==
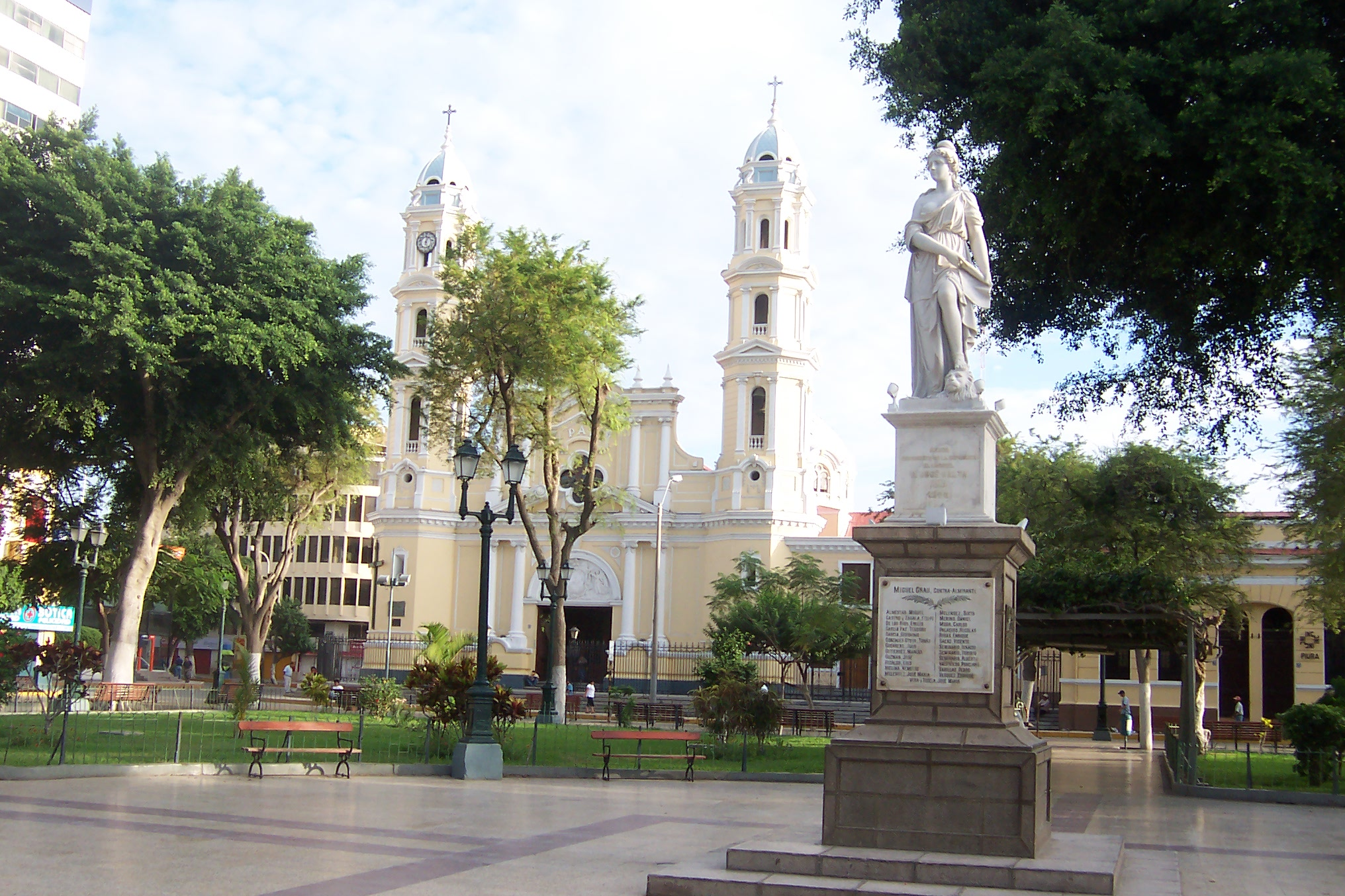
Plaza de Armas of Piura

The most important culture that developed in the Piura region was Vicús, which stood out for its ceramics and delicate work in gold. The Tallanes or Yungas, however, were the first settlers, who migrated from the Sierra. During a period that is still vague, they lived in behetrias, which were primitive settlements without a head or an organization. Later they were conquered by the Mochicas and, centuries later, by the Incas, during the rule of Tupac Inca Yupanqui.

In 1532, Francisco Pizarro founded the first Spanish city in South America on the banks of the Chira River in the Tangarará Valley. He named it San Miguel de Piura. The founding date is still subject of controversy. However, during the 450th anniversary celebrations, July 15 was adopted as the official date.

In 1534, due to a lack of sanitary conditions, the capital was moved to Monte de los Padres (Morropón); in 1578, and for the same reason, it was moved again, this time to San Francisco de la Buena Esperanza (Paita). In 1588, the permanent attacks of the English pirates and privateers forced a final relocation of the capital to Piura.

During colonial times, life went by peacefully. Yet, the raids against the Spanish authorities led by Admirals Borran and Cochrane, members of the libertarian expedition of José de San Martín, woke the longing for liberty in the minds of the local people.

== Culture and customs of Piura ==
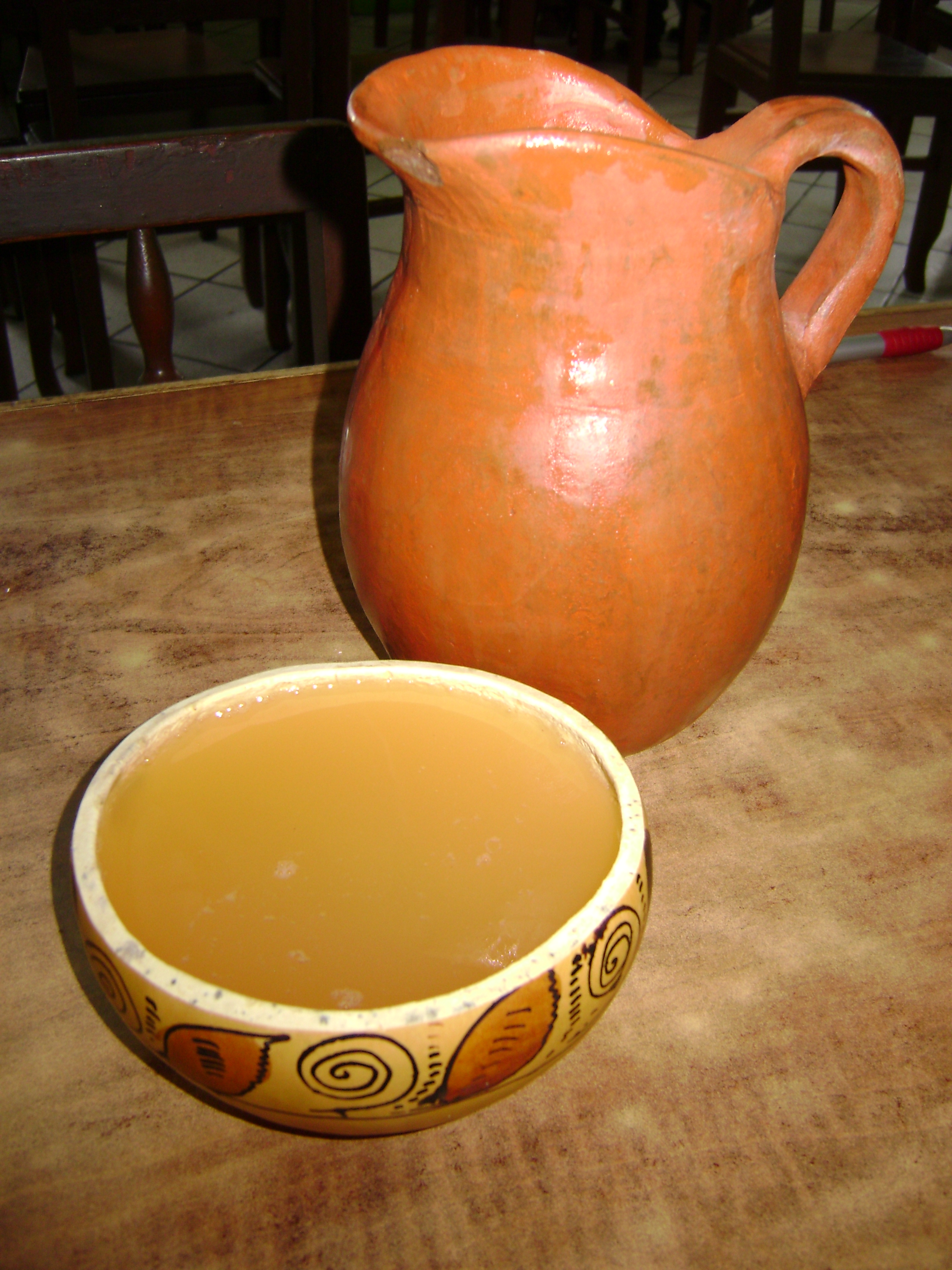
Clarito served in a bowl known as "poto". Catacaos, Peru.

Piura is host to a unique mestizo culture, since all races mix here. Local Piuranos have a different accent from their neighbours at both sides since: they tend elongate their syllables in a similar ways to northern Mexicans. Piuranos have their own proud slang. Locals for example, call themselves Churres (popular term used for a young Piuran or northern person).

Piuranos are characterized by their witty minds, melancolic Tondero music and welcoming personalities. Like many Peruvians, they enjoy drinking chicha de jora, pisco or beer and many of them have a tendency towards creativity and art as their source of income.

Local gastronomical dishes include the Piuran Secho de Chavelo (the capital's dish), Algarrobina cocktails, many types of ceviches and other seafoods like Majarisco and Pasao al Agua. Piura is famed for its natilla sweets as well.

The warm climate of this region forbids hard labour from 1:00 p.m. to 4:00 p.m., so it is common tradition to take siestas and better to wake up early to get important stuff done before noon.

Processions and religious folk are passionately practiced by some of the locals. One of them is Cristo de Ayabaca.

Popular crafts are the Chulucana Pottery and handy hats and silversmith arts made from the Catacaos Province.

Northern cowboys can still be seen today wandering the deserts of Sechura, Catacaos and the forests of Morropon transporting their goods using donkeys and mules. They seem to resemble physically the "American Southwest" cowboys, or Argentinian gauchos and Mexican charros. They are noted not only for their abilities to sing and play Cumanana and Tondero but as silversmiths that work the filigree earrings, leathers, hats, wooden and silver utensils of Catacaos region.

=== Music ===
The Tondero and Cumanana are the traditional music of the Piura Region.

Chicha music, now called Tecnocumbia (originally a Peruvian styled cumbia with electronic elements), is the modern version of popular music all over, as well as Salsa among youngsters.

Another great tradition that is sung by all northern Peruvians is the famous Peruvian Waltz, well practiced by traditional musicians (northern Peruvians have their style).

== Political division ==
Map of provinces

The region is divided into 8 provinces (Spanish: provincias, singular: provincia), which are composed of 64 districts (distritos, singular: distrito). The provinces, with their capitals in parentheses, are:

1. Ayabaca (Ayabaca)
2. Huancabamba (Huancabamba)
3. Morropón (Chulucanas)
4. Paita (Paita)
5. Piura (Piura)
6. Sechura (Sechura)
7. Sullana (Sullana)
8. Talara (Talara)

=== Populated places ===
Populated places include:

- Angostura
- Ayabaca
- Cabo Blanco
- Cajunga
- Catacaos
- Chato
- Chulucanas
- Huancabamba
- Máncora
- Paita
- Piura
- Punta Arenas
- Sechura
- Sullana
- Talara
- Tambogrande
