= San Juan de Bigote District =

Coordinates: 5.3191°S 79.7864°W

San Juan de Bigote
- District
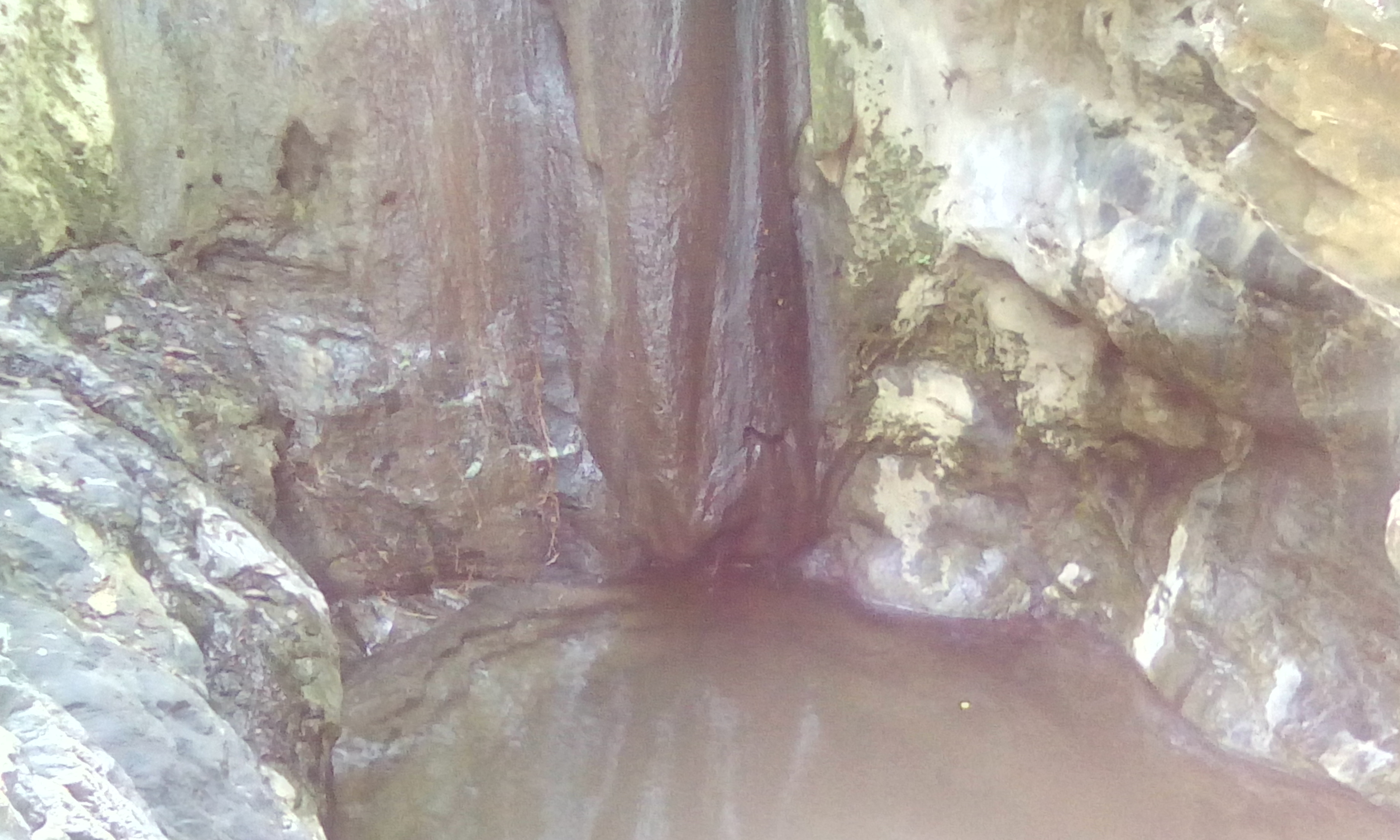
- Lisa de Oro waterfalls
- Interactive map of San Juan de Bigote
- Country: Peru
- Region: Piura
- Province: Morropón
- Founded: December 29, 1986
- Capital: Bigote

Government
  - Mayor: Víctor Raúl Jiménez Espinoza

Area
  - Total: 245.21 km^{2} (94.68 sq mi)
- Elevation: 174 m (571 ft)

Population (2017 census)
  - Total: 6,433
  - Density: 26.23/km^{2} (67.95/sq mi)
- Time zone: UTC-5 (PET)
- UBIGEO: 200407

San Juan de Bigote District is one of ten districts of the Morropón province, located in the department of Piura in Peru.

It borders to the north with the Yamango District, to the northwest with Buenos Aires District, to the west, southwest and south with Salitral District, to the southeast with Canchaque District in the Huancabamba province; and to the east and northeast again with Yamango District.

== History ==
The district of San Juan de Bigote was created in December 29, 1986, during the first presidency of Alan García Pérez.

== Territorial organization ==
The district is conformed by the following localities:

- Alan García
- Almendro
- Bado de Garzas
- Barrios Alto
- Barrios Bajo
- Bigote
- Campo Nuevo
- Cardal
- Dotor
- La Pareja
- La Quemazón
- Limonal Alto
- Limonal Bajo
- Los Charanes
- Los Guayaquiles Bajos
- Manzanares
- Miguel Pampa
- Miraflores
- Nuevo Porvenir
- Palo Negro
- San Fernando
- San Martín Alto
- San Martín Bajo
- San Rafael
- Santa Rosa
- Sinai
- Virgen del Carmen
