= Huancabamba (disambiguation) =

Huancabamba may refer to:

- Huancabamba, Huancabamba Province, a town in northern Peru.
- Huancabamba, Oxapampa Province, a town in central Peru.
- Huancabamba District, Huancabamba, a district in the Huancabamba Province in Peru.
- Huancabamba District, Oxapampa, a district in the Oxapampa Province in Peru.
- Huancabamba Province, a province in northern Peru.
- Huancabamba River, a river in central Peru.
- Huancabamba River (Piura), a river in northern Peru.
- Huancabamba Depression, a depression in the Andes mountain range.
