= Olmos River =

- Location of mouth

Location
- Country: Peru

Physical characteristics
- Mouth
  - coordinates: 6°14′47″S 80°03′03″W

Olmos River (Río Olmos), is a river in the Lambayeque Region in northwestern Peru. It flows off the west slopes of the Andes and its tributaries, such as Los Boliches, carry little additional water. As a result, it is a low flow stream, intermittent in its lower reaches only flowing during the rainy season (mid November to mid April). Before it can reach the Pacific Ocean it disappears into the alluvium of the Sechura Desert. The Olmos River is 91 kilometres (57 mi) long and its river basin covers 965.0 square kilometres (373 sq mi).

The river starts in Huancabamba Province and flows south and west into Olmos District of Lambayeque Region. It passes just south of the town of Olmos, from which the river takes its name.

== Olmos irrigation project ==
The Olmos irrigation project diverts 32.4 cubic metres per second (1,144 cu ft/s) of water from the Tabacones River, a tributary of the Huancabamba River, at the Limón dam via a 24 km tunnel to the Olmos River. The diversion includes a hydroelectric power plant and it irrigates about 400 square kilometres (98,842 acres) in the Pampas de Olmos.
