= List of ambassadors of Peru to the Holy See =

Ambassador of Peru to the Holy See
- Great Seal of Peru
- Ministry of Foreign Affairs; 63 Via Di Porta Angelica, Rome
- Appointer: The president of Peru
- Inaugural holder: Bartolomé Herrera Vélez (As Envoy Extraordinary and Minister Plenipotentiary to the State of the Church)
- Formation: 1852
- Website: Embassy of Peru to the Holy See

The extraordinary and plenipotentiary ambassador of Peru to the Holy See is the official representative of the Republic of Peru to the Holy See. The ambassador is also accredited to the Sovereign Military Order of Malta.

Diplomatic relations were officially established in 1859 under Pius IX and have been maintained since. Peru maintains an embassy in Rome—accredited to the Vatican—and the Holy See has an Apostolic Nunciature in Lima.

== List of representatives ==
=== Representatives (1852–1870) ===
Name	Portrait	Term begin	Term end	President	Notes
Bartolomé Herrera Vélez		1852	1853	José Rufino Echenique	First Peruvian diplomat to the Holy See as Envoy Extraordinary and Minister Plenipotentiary
Luis Mesones		1859; 1865	1861; 1865	Ramón Castilla	As Envoy Extraordinary and Minister Plenipotentiary

=== Representatives (1870–1929) ===
Name	Portrait	Term begin	Term end	President	Notes
Pedro Gálvez Egúsquiza		1873	1878	Manuel Pardo	As Envoy Extraordinary and Minister Plenipotentiary
Juan Mariano de Goyeneche		1878	1878	Mariano Ignacio Prado	As Envoy Extraordinary and Minister Plenipotentiary; 3rd Count of Guaqui
Manuel M. Mesones		1882	1883	Disputed	As Minister Resident. The son of Luis Mesones, he was in charge of appointing new bishops and was faced with the aftermath of the War of the Pacific, i.e. the separation of Tarapacá from Peru, as well as the Tacna-Arica Question, which clashed with the aforementioned duties.
Aurelio García y García		1884	1885	Miguel Iglesias	As Envoy Extraordinary and Minister Plenipotentiary. Disputed with Mesones.
Manuel M. Mesones		1885	1885	Miguel Iglesias	As Confidential Agent
Manuel M. Mesones		1886	1887	Andrés Avelino Cáceres	As Minister Resident
Juan Mariano de Goyeneche		1887	1920	Andrés Avelino Cáceres	
Juan Mariano de Goyeneche		1920	1924	Andrés Avelino Cáceres	
Ricardo Rey y Boza		1924	1926	Augusto B. Leguía	Marquess of Gilés
Eleodoro Romero		1926	1930	Augusto B. Leguía	The Lateran Treaty signed in February 1929 between the Holy See and Italy became effective on June 7 of the same year, establishing the city-state of Vatican City.

=== Representatives (2022–2026) ===
Name	Portrait	Term begin	Term end	President	Notes
Paolo S. Mimbela		1930	1940	Manuel María Ponce Brousset	
Diomede Arias Schreiber		1940	1945	Manuel Prado y Ugarteche	
Arturo García Salazar		1946	1948	José Luis Bustamante y Rivero	
Enrico Swayne		1948	1949	Manuel A. Odría	
Felipe S. Portocarrero		1949	1951	Manuel A. Odría	
Mario Sosa Pardo de Zela		1951	1952	Manuel A. Odría	
José Félix Aramburú		1952	1954	Manuel A. Odría	
Diómedes Arias-Schreiber		1954	1956	Manuel Prado Ugarteche	
Adelmo Risi Ferreyros		1956	1957	Manuel Prado Ugarteche	
Luis Felipe Lanata Coudy		November 11, 1957	1962	Manuel Prado Ugarteche	
Germán Aramburú Lecaro		1962	1969	Ricardo Pérez Godoy	
Victor Proaño Correa		1969	1971	Juan Velasco Alvarado	
José Carlos Ferreyros Balta		1971	1974	Juan Velasco Alvarado	
José Luis De Cossio y Ruiz De Somocurcio		1974	1977	Juan Velasco Alvarado	
Jorge Morelli Pando		1977	1979	Francisco Morales Bermúdez	
Jorge Nicholson Sologuren		1979	1984	Francisco Morales Bermúdez	
Hugo de Zela Hurtado		1984	1987	Fernando Belaúnde Terry	
Hubert Wieland Alzamora		1987	1992	Alan García	
Luis Solari Tudela		1992	1995	Alberto Fujimori	
Augusto Antonioli Vásquez		1995	1997	Alberto Fujimori	
Luis Solari Tudela		1997	2000	Alberto Fujimori	
Alberto Montagne Vidal		2001	2004	Alejandro Toledo	Vidal presented his credentials to the Order of Malta on May 16, 2001.
José Pablo Moran Val		2004	2006	Alejandro Toledo	Also accredited to Cyprus and the Order of Malta.
Octavio Vizcarra Pacheco		2006	2007	Alan García	
Alfonso Rivero Monsalve		2007	2011	Alan García	
José Mariano de Cossío Rivas		2011	2012	Ollanta Humala	
César Castillo Ramírez		2012	2012	Ollanta Humala	
Juan Carlos Gamarra Skeels		August 1, 2013	2015	Ollanta Humala	Appointed on December 20, 2013 to the Sovereign Order of Malta.
María Elvira Velásquez Rivas-Plata		2015; December 7, 2017	2017; December 29, 2020	Ollanta Humala	First female ambassador to the Holy See. During her tenure, Peter Cassar Torreggiani, honorary Consul in Valetta since 1993, was dismissed. She was also accredited to the Order of Malta and the Republic of Malta in 2020.
Jorge Eduardo Morán Rey		September 15, 2021	December 7, 2022	Pedro Castillo	Accredited to the Order of Malta in 2022.

== See also ==
- List of ambassadors of Peru to Italy
