= Guabal =

Guabal may refer to:

- Guabal, Ecuador
- Guabal, Cajamarca, Peru
- Guabal, Piura, Peru
- Guabal, Panama
- El Guabal, Colombia
- El Guabal, Dominican Republic
