= Salitral, Morropón =

Salitral San Andrés de Salitral
- Town
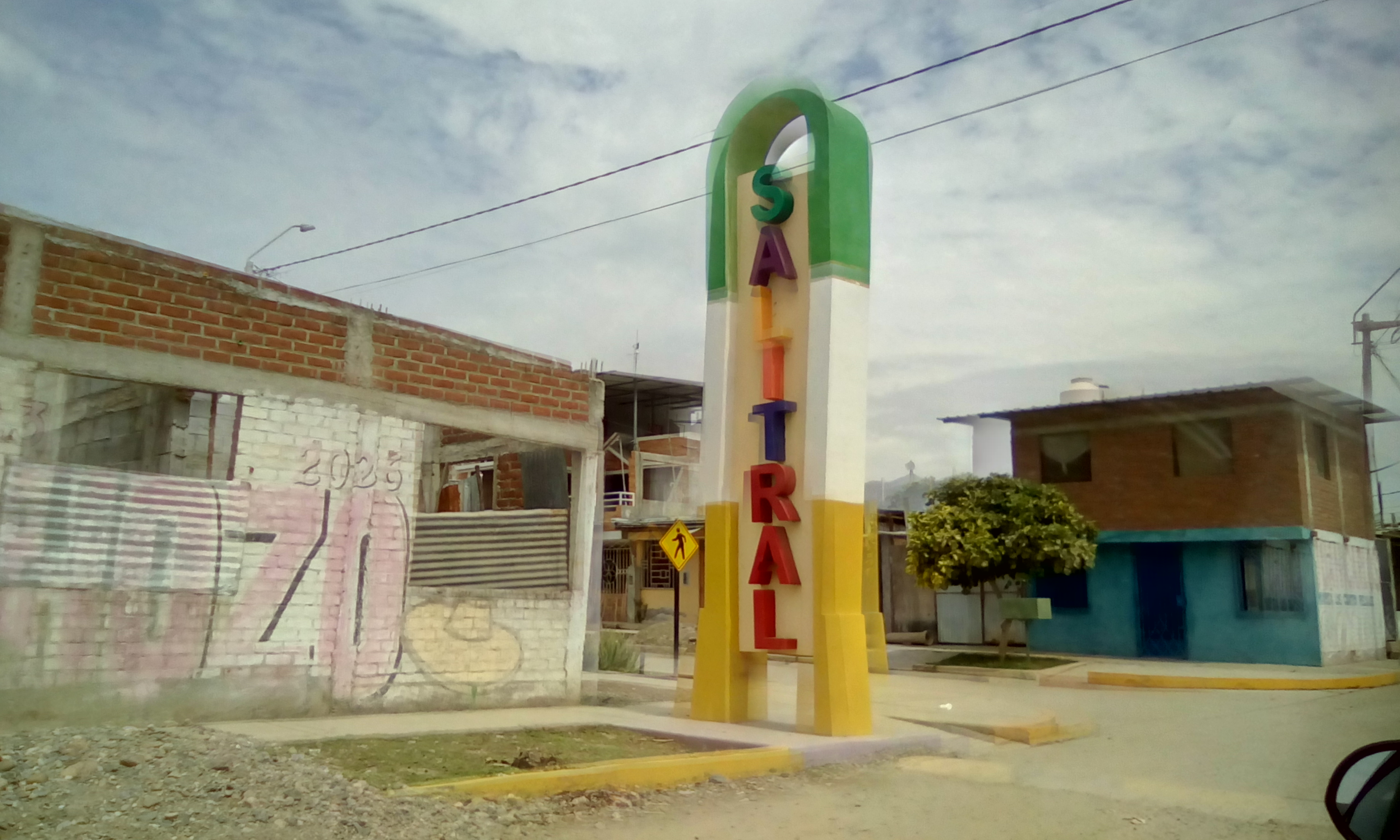
- Interactive map of Salitral
- Country: Peru
- Department: Piura
- Province: Morropón
- District: Salitral
- Elevation: 175 m (574 ft)

Population (2017)
  - Total: 1,021
- Postal Code: 20401
- Area code: 73

Salitral, full name San Andrés de Salitral, is a town located in the department of Piura, in Morropón province, in the district of the same name in Peru. It is the capital of the aforementioned district.

== Demographics ==
In the 2017 census Salitral had a population of 1,021 inhabitants.

Historical population
| Year | Pop. | ±% |
|---|---|---|
| 1940 | 397 | — |
| 1993 | 906 | +128.2% |
| 2017 | 1,021 | +12.7% |
Source: Population 1940, 1993 and 2017
