= List of ambassadors of Peru to Italy =

Ambassador of Peru to the Italian Republic
- Great Seal of Peru
- Ministry of Foreign Affairs; Via Francesco Siacci 2b, Rome
- Appointer: The president of Peru
- Inaugural holder: Andrés Álvarez-Calderón
- Formation: July 17, 1869
- Website: Embassy of Peru in Italy

The extraordinary and plenipotentiary ambassador of Peru to the Italian Republic is the official representative of the Republic of Peru to the Italian Republic.

It is customary for the ambassador to represent Peru before the Food and Agriculture Organization of the United Nations (FAO) due to the headquarters of this body in Rome; as well as organizations such as the International Fund for Agricultural Development (IFAD) and before the World Food Programme (WFP). The Peruvian ambassador in Rome also acts as concurrent ambassador for San Marino and Cyprus, (Note: The first ambassador to Cyprus was Guillermo Fernández-Cornejo, accredited from Tel Aviv, who presented his credentials on September 2, 1988.) as well as Malta as of December 2022.

Both countries established bilateral relations on 23 December 1874, with Peru having previously established relations with the Holy See in 1852 before the unification of Italy. Today, around 500,000–900,000 Peruvians of Italian descent live in the country, most notably in Lima.

== List of representatives ==
Name	Portrait	Term begin	Term end	President	Notes
Bartolomé Herrera Vélez		April 30, 1852	1852	José Rufino Echenique	As Minister Plenipotentiary before the Courts of Rome, Turin, Naples and Florence. Also served as the first Peruvian diplomat to the Holy See.
José Dávila Condemarín		April 11, 1858	?	Ramón Castilla	As Chargé d'affaires in Turin to the Kingdom of Sardinia.
Luis Mesones		May 26, 1862	?	Ramón Castilla	As Chargé d'affaires to the Holy See.
Andrés Álvarez-Calderón		July 17, 1869	August 20, 1872	José Balta	As ad honorem Chargé d'affaires in Italy. Count of Álvarez-Calderón
Luciano Benjamín Cisneros		1878	1882	Mariano Ignacio Prado	As plenipotentiary minister.
José Francisco Canevaro		1885	November 15, 1900	Miguel Iglesias	As plenipotentiary minister. 2nd Count of Zoagli
Andrés Avelino Cáceres		1905	1911	José Pardo y Barreda	
Melitón Porras Osores		1911	1912	Guillermo Billinghurst	
Carlos Zavala Loayza		1913	1914	Guillermo Billinghurst	
Óscar R. Benavides		1918	1919	José Pardo y Barreda	
Arturo Osores		1920	1922	Augusto B. Leguía	
Pedro Mujica Carassa		1922	1924	Augusto B. Leguía	
Germán Cisneros Raygada		1925	1928	Augusto B. Leguía	
Germán Luna Iglesias		1930	1933	Augusto B. Leguía	
José Matías Manzanilla		1933	1939	Óscar R. Benavides	
Diómedes Arias-Schreiber		1940	1944	Manuel Prado Ugarteche	
Pedro Yrigoyen Diez Canseco		1944	1946	Manuel Prado Ugarteche	
Ricardo Rivera Schreiber		1946	1948	José Luis Bustamante y Rivero	
Luis A. Flores		1948	1950	Manuel A. Odría	
José Félix Aramburú Salinas		1952	1954	Manuel A. Odría	
Eduardo Garland		1958	1961	Manuel Prado Ugarteche	
Alfonso Arias Schreiber Pezet		?	?	Manuel Prado Ugarteche	
Carlos Miró-Quesada Laos		1968	1969	Juan Velasco Alvarado	
Alejandro Deustua Arróspide		1971	1973	Juan Velasco Alvarado	
Arturo García García		1973	?	Juan Velasco Alvarado	Also accredited to Greece.
Luis Solari Tudela		1985	?	Alan García	
Manuel Augusto Roca Zela		?	?	Alan García	
Enrique Rössl Link		September 10, 1992	July 26, 1995	Alberto Fujimori	
Ana María Deustua Caravedo		1995	2000	Alberto Fujimori	
Hugo Ernesto Palma Valderrama		2002	2002	Alejandro Toledo	
José Pablo Morán Val		2003	2004	Alejandro Toledo	
Harold Forsyth		November 9, 2004	March 15, 2006	Alejandro Toledo	
Carlos Roca Cáceres		2006	2009	Alan García	
Rafael Rey		February 11, 2009	July 11, 2009	Alan García	
Augusto Ferrero Costa		December 1, 2009	December 31, 2010	Alan García	
César Castillo Ramírez		2011	2012	Alan García	
Alfredo Arosemena		April 15, 2012	2014	Ollanta Humala	
Eda Rivas		April 16, 2015	September 29, 2016	Ollanta Humala	Designated as Ambassador to San Marino on September 16, 2015 and Ambassador to Cyprus on September 18.
Luis Iberico		September 29, 2016	November 25, 2018	Pedro Pablo Kuczynski	Concurrent with Cyprus and San Marino from December 7, 2016. During his tenure, the honorary consul in San Marino was Giorgio Fiorenza.
Julio Eduardo Martinetti Macedo		May 1, 2019	November 9, 2020	Martín Vizcarra	Martinetti presented his credentials for Cyprus on February 6 and for San Marino on September 25, 2020. He was accredited to Malta on March 21, 2022.

== See also ==
- List of ambassadors of Peru to the Holy See
- List of ambassadors of Italy to Peru
