= List of ambassadors of Italy to Peru =

Ambassador of Italy to Peru
- L'ambasciatore italiano a Lima
- Emblem of Italy
- Incumbent; Massimiliano Mazzanti since 2023
- Inaugural holder: Luis Baratta (Representing Sardinia)
- Formation: 1842

The Ambassador of Italy in Peru (Spanish: Embajador de Italia en Lima) is the head of the diplomatic mission of the Italian Republic in the Republic of Peru.

Both countries formally established bilateral relations on 23 December 1874, with Peru having previously established relations with the predecessor states, such as the Holy See in 1852 before the unification of Italy. Today, around 500,000–900,000 Peruvians of Italian descent live in the South American country, most notably in Lima.

== List of representatives ==
=== Representatives before 1874 ===
Period	Title	Name	Residence	Appointed by	Accredited by	Note
Sardinian consulate opened in 1842
1842–1847	Consul of Sardinia	Luis Baratta	Lima	Kingdom of Sardinia	Manuel Menéndez	
1847–1861	Consul of Sardinia	Giuseppe Canevaro	Lima	Balbo government	Ramón Castilla	
17 March 1861: Proclamation of the Kingdom of Italy
1861–1863	Consul of Italy	Giuseppe Canevaro	Lima	Cavour IV Cabinet	Ramón Castilla	First representative of the Kingdom of Italy.
1863–1866	Consul of Italy	Juan Antonio Migliorati	Lima	Minghetti I Cabinet	Miguel de San Román	Also accredited to Chile and Bolivia.
1866–1866	Consul (a.i.) of Italy	Carlos Alberto Cavalchini	Lima	Ricasoli II Cabinet	Mariano Ignacio Prado	
1867–1876	Consul of Italy	Hipólito Garrou	Lima	Rattazzi II Cabinet	Mariano Ignacio Prado	
20 September 1870: Rome falls to the Italians, the unification of Italy is now complete

=== Representatives since 1876 ===
Period	Title	Name	Residence	Appointed by	Accredited by	Note
1854–1880: Vice-consulates (called "consular agencies") are opened in Peruvian cities with a sizeable Italian presence. These include Paita (1854), Arica (1856), Tacna (1870), Ica (1873), Iquique (1874), and Arequipa (1880). By 1900, all departmental capitals have a diplomatic mission.
1876–1882	Consul	Giovanni Battista Viviani	Lima	Depretis I Cabinet	Manuel Pardo y Lavalle	
	Envoy Extraordinary and Minister Plenipotentiary	Giuseppe Pirrone	Lima	?	?	c. 1899.
	Envoy Extraordinary and Minister Plenipotentiary	Rufillo Agnoli	Lima	?	?	c. 1914.
before 1933–1936	Minister Plenipotentiary	Vittorio Bianchi	Lima	Mussolini Cabinet	Luis Miguel Sánchez Cerro	
1936–1938	Minister Plenipotentiary	Giuseppe Talamo	Lima	Mussolini Cabinet	Óscar R. Benavides	
24 January 1942–November 1944: Diplomatic relations severed due to World War II
1980–?	Ambassador	Guglielmo Folchi	Lima	Cossiga Cabinet	Fernando Belaúnde	Previously the ambassador to Caracas.
?–2001	Ambassador	Giuseppe Maria Borga	Lima	?	Alberto Fujimori	c. 2000
c. 2002–?	Ambassador	Sergio Bussetto	Lima	Berlusconi II Cabinet	Alejandro Toledo	
September 16, 2008–2010	Ambassador	Francesco Rausi	Lima	Berlusconi IV Cabinet	Alan García	
December 23, 2010–2014	Ambassador	Guglielmo Ardizzone	Lima	Berlusconi IV Cabinet	Alan García	
August 14, 2014–2018	Ambassador	Mauro Marsili	Lima	Renzi Cabinet	Ollanta Humala	
November 5, 2018–2023	Ambassador	Giancarlo Maria Curcio	Lima	Conte I Cabinet	Martín Vizcarra	
2023–Incumbent	Ambassador	Massimiliano Mazzanti	Lima	Meloni government	Dina Boluarte	

== See also ==
- List of ambassadors of Peru to Italy
- Apostolic Nunciature to Peru
