= Sondor (disambiguation) =

Sondor may refer to:

- Sondor District, a district in the Piura Region, Peru
- Sóndor, an archaeological site in the Apurímac Region, Peru
- Sondor (Abancay-Antabamba), a mountain on the border of the Abancay Province and the Antabamba Province, Apurímac Region, Peru
- Sóndor (Cusco), a mountain in the Cusco Region, Peru
- Sondor, an electronics company.
