= Holy See–Peru relations =

- Holy See: Peru

Diplomatic mission
- Apostolic Nunciature to Peru: Embassy of Peru to the Holy See

Envoy
- Apostolic Nuncio Paolo Rocco Gualtieri: Ambassador Jorge Eduardo Morán Rey

Holy See–Peru relations are foreign relations between the Holy See and Peru.

== History ==
Both countries initiated diplomatic contacts under Pius IX after a series of visits by Monsignor Bartolomé Herrera, with diplomatic relations being officially established in 1859 under Luis Mesones between Peru and the Papal States. During a mission by Pedro Gálvez Egúsquiza, the Bula Praeclara Inter Beneficia was issued on March 5, 1875, Apostolic Letters that recognized the Presidents of Peru the exercise of the Right of Patronage that de facto they had exercised since the country's independence as successors of the Monarchs of Spain.

An agreement was signed on July 19, 1980, effective since the 26th of the same month. It established the prerogatives, tax exemptions, the legal status of the Catholic Church and recognizes its importance in the historical, cultural and moral formation of the country.

Pope John Paul II made two pastoral visits. The first was in February 1985 and the second in May 1988. Pope Francis made one in January 2018.

In May 2025, American-born and naturalized citizen of Peru, Robert Francis Prevost, then-Prefect of the Dicastery for Bishops and then-President of the Pontifical Commission for Latin America, was elected Pope and took the Papal name as Pope Leo XIV, becoming the first Pope from Peru, the second Pope to come from the Americas (after Pope Francis), the first Pope with dual citizenship (for Pope Leo XIV holds a dual American and Peruvian citizenship), and the first pope to be born after World War II.

== High-level visits ==
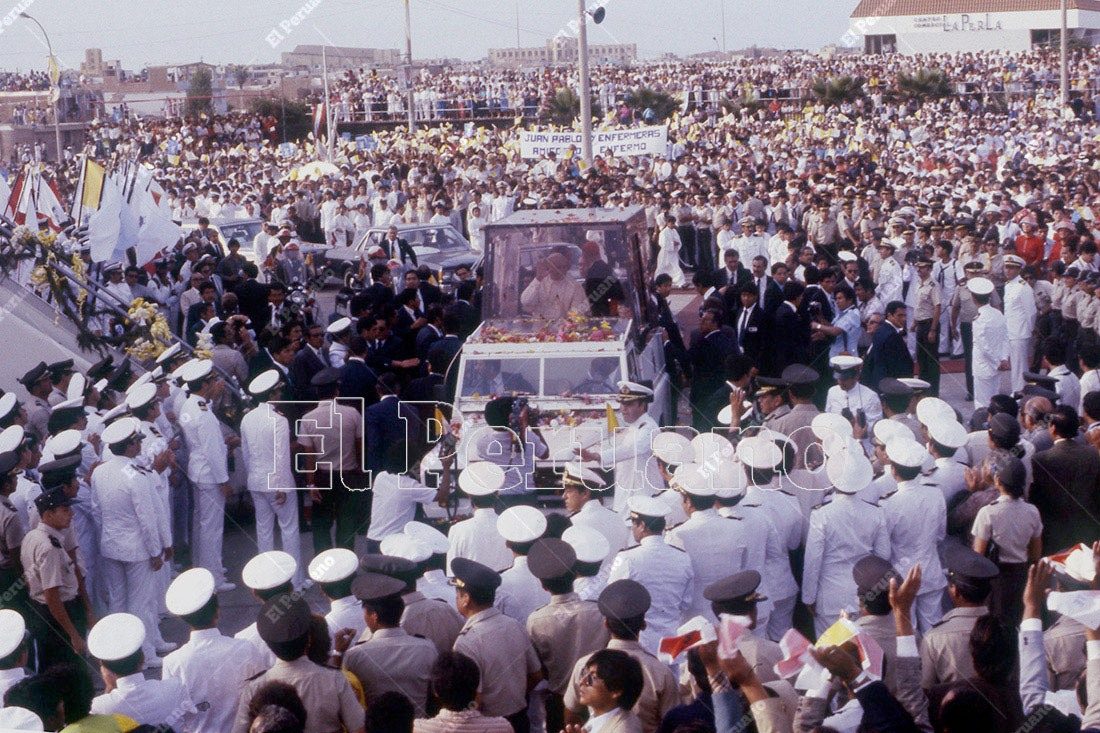
Pope John Paul II in Callao; 1985.

Papal visits from the Holy See to Peru

- Pope John Paul II (1985, 1988)
- Pope Francis (2018)

Presidential visits from Peru to the Holy See

- President Alberto Fujimori (1997)
- President Alan García (2009)
- President Ollanta Humala (2014)
- President Pedro Pablo Kuczynski (2017)
- President Dina Boluarte (2023)

== Resident diplomatic missions ==
- Holy See has an apostolic nunciature in Lima.
- Peru has an embassy based in Rome.
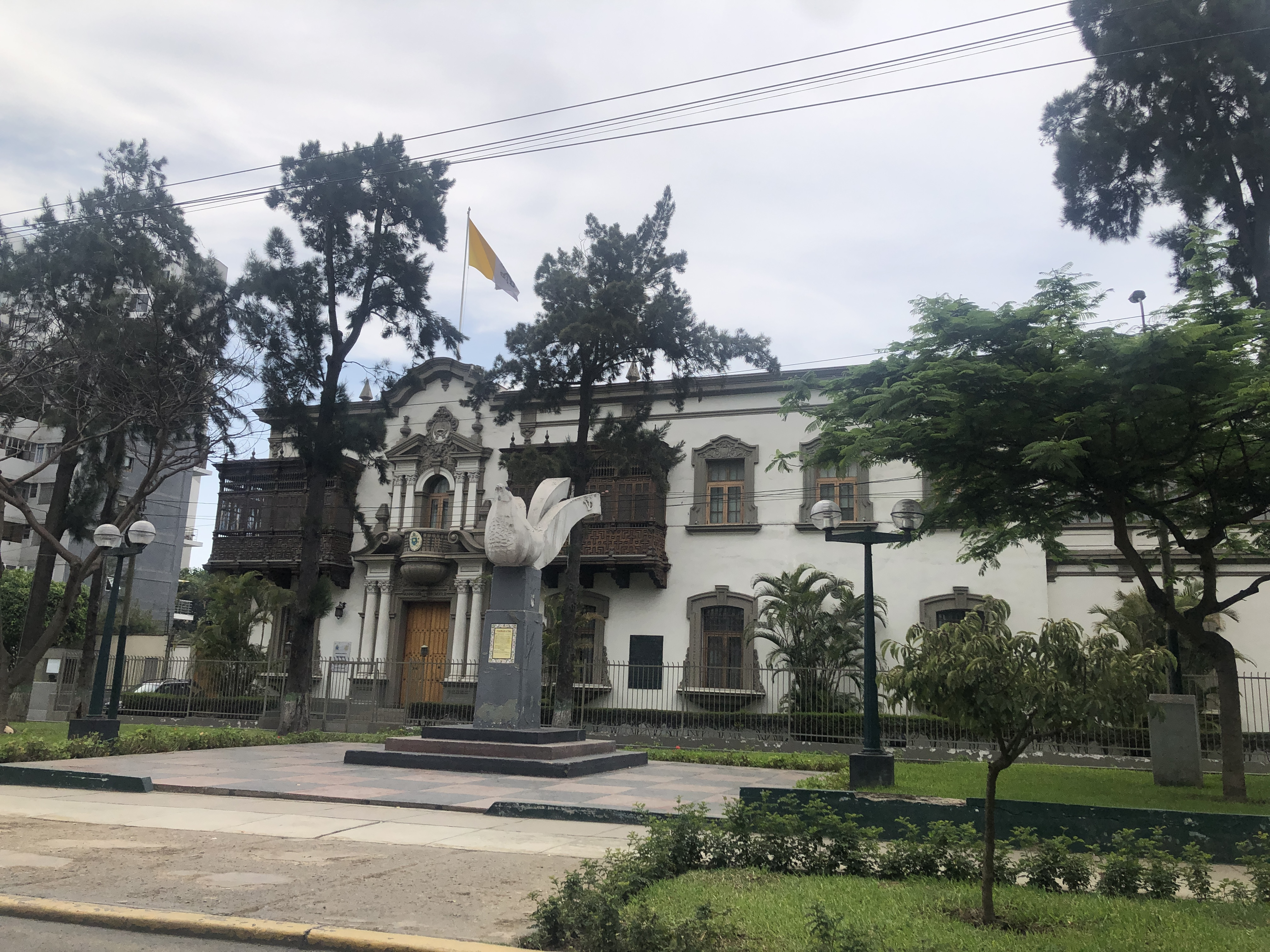
Apostolic Nunciature of the Holy See in Lima

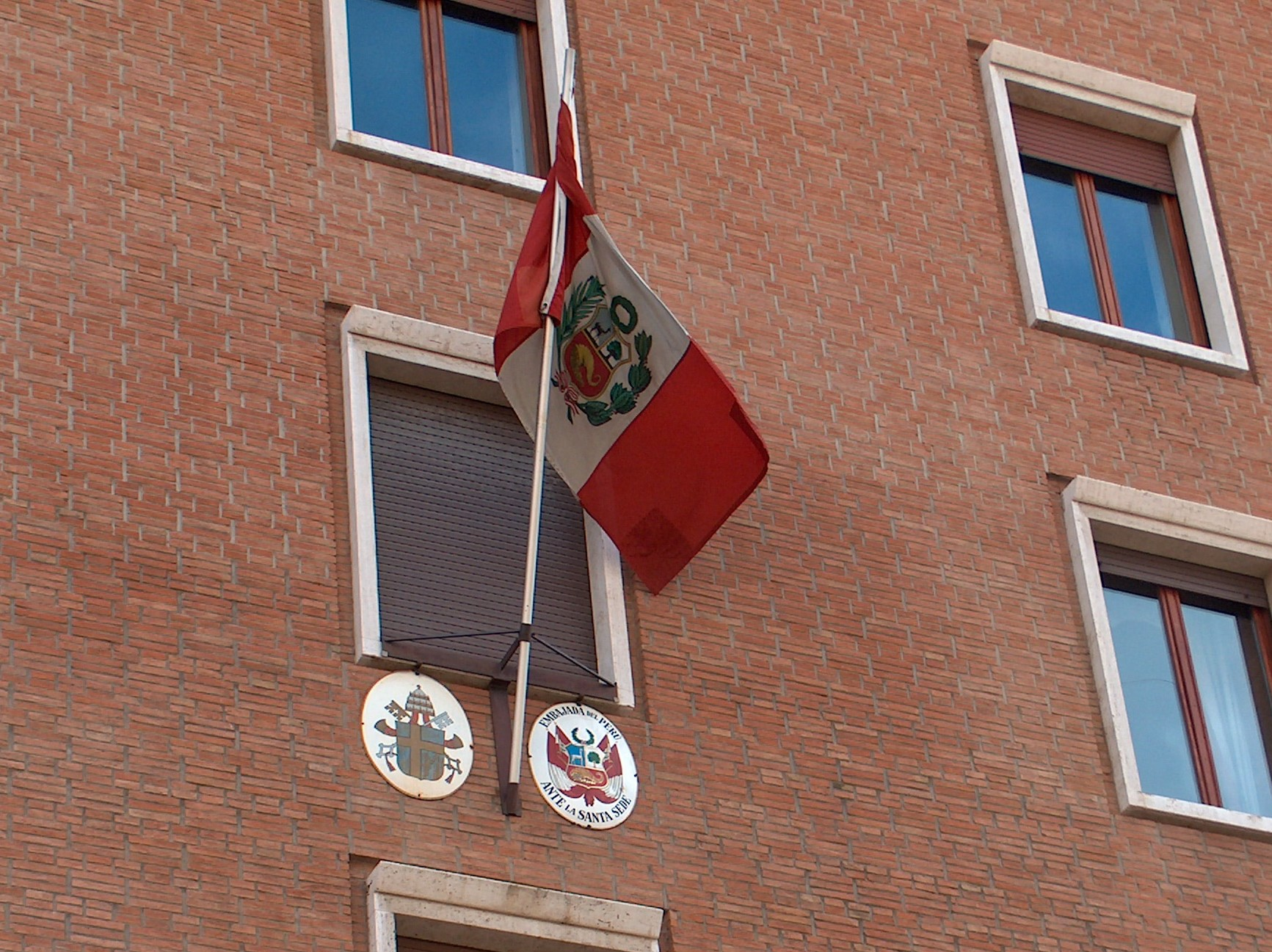
Embassy of Peru to the Holy See in Rome

== See also ==
- Catholic Church in Peru
- List of ambassadors of Peru to the Holy See
