= Embassy of Peru, Holy See =

Embassy of Peru to the Holy See
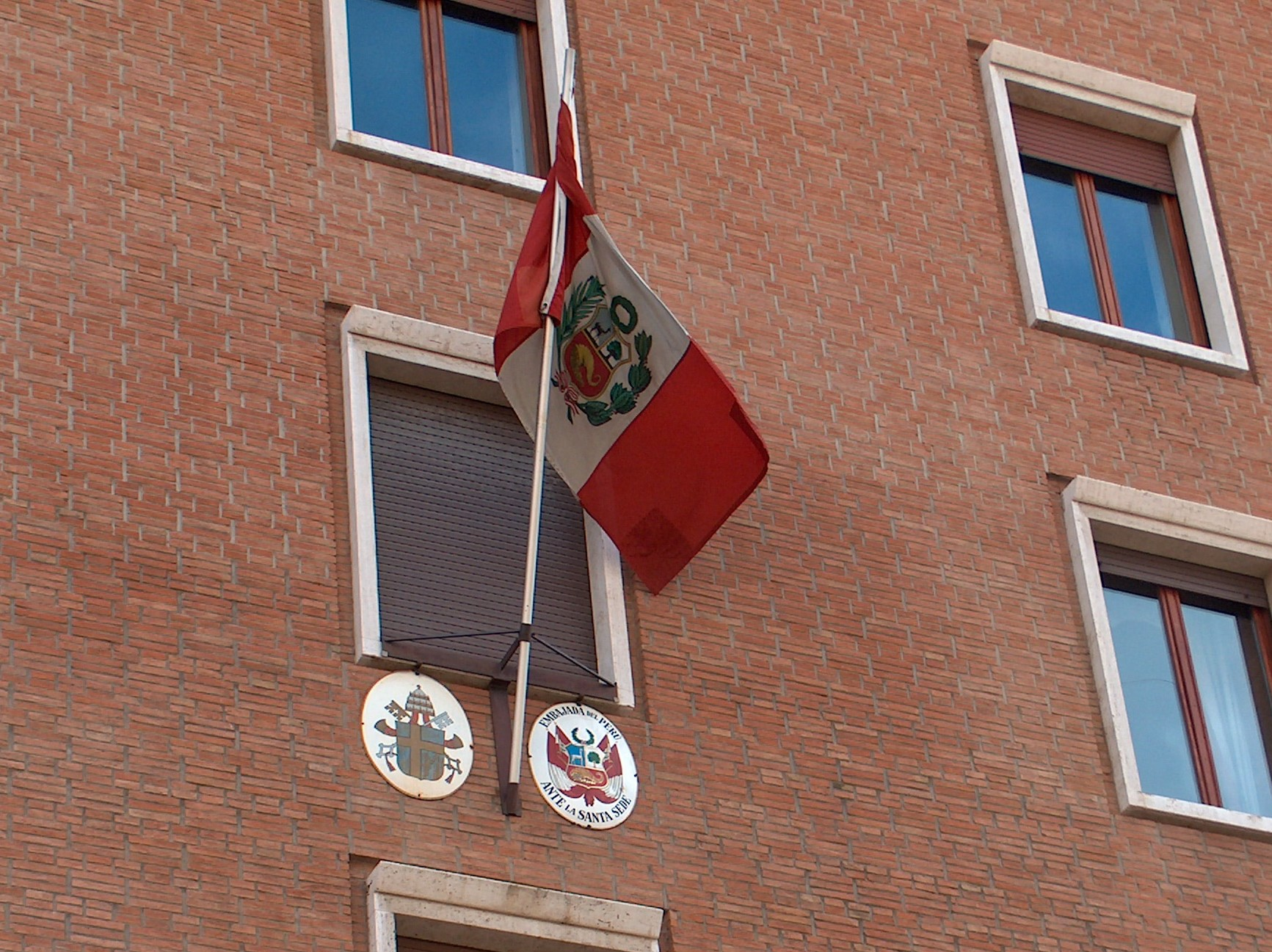
- Address: 63 Via Di Porta Angelica, Rome
- Ambassador: Luis Juan Chuquihuara Chil
- Jurisdiction: Vatican City; Order of Malta
- Website: Official website

The Embassy of Peru to the Holy See (Spanish: Embajada del Perú ante la Santa Sede) is the diplomatic mission of Peru to the Holy See. It is located in Rome, across the street from the Vatican.

The current Peruvian ambassador to the Holy See is Luis Juan Chuquihuara Chil, also accredited to the Sovereign Military Order of Malta.

Diplomatic relations were officially established in 1859 under Pius IX and have been maintained since.

== See also ==
- Apostolic Nunciature to Peru
