= Sondorillo District =

Coordinates: 5.3392°S 79.4289°W

Sondorillo
- District
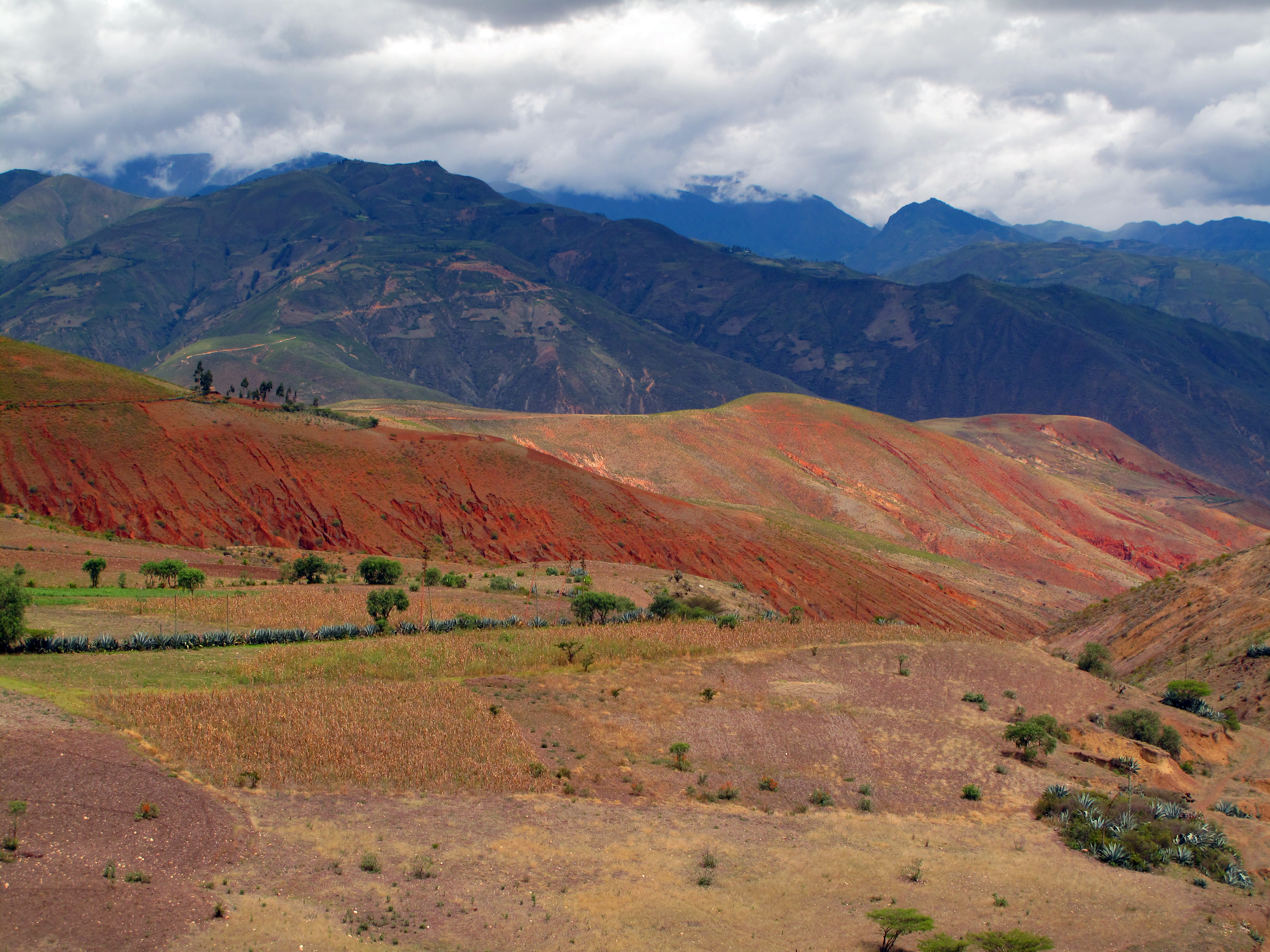
- Interactive map of Sondorillo
- Country: Peru
- Region: Piura
- Province: Huancabamba
- Founded: March 27, 1935
- Capital: Sondorillo

Government
  - Mayor: Pedro Miguel Ludeña Ocaña

Area
  - Total: 226.09 km^{2} (87.29 sq mi)
- Elevation: 1,888 m (6,194 ft)

Population (2005 census)
  - Total: 10,664
  - Density: 47.167/km^{2} (122.16/sq mi)
- Time zone: UTC-5 (PET)
- UBIGEO: 200308

Sondorillo District is one of eight districts of the province Huancabamba in Peru.

== Climate ==
Climate data for Sondorillo, elevation 1,917 m (6,289 ft), (1991–2020)
Month	Jan	Feb	Mar	Apr	May	Jun	Jul	Aug	Sep	Oct	Nov	Dec	Year
Mean daily maximum °C (°F)	26.0 (78.8)	25.5 (77.9)	25.6 (78.1)	25.8 (78.4)	25.4 (77.7)	24.3 (75.7)	24.3 (75.7)	24.7 (76.5)	25.6 (78.1)	26.1 (79.0)	26.6 (79.9)	26.3 (79.3)	25.5 (77.9)
Mean daily minimum °C (°F)	14.8 (58.6)	14.8 (58.6)	14.8 (58.6)	14.7 (58.5)	14.4 (57.9)	14.5 (58.1)	14.1 (57.4)	14.3 (57.7)	14.6 (58.3)	14.8 (58.6)	14.1 (57.4)	14.5 (58.1)	14.5 (58.2)
Average precipitation mm (inches)	36.0 (1.42)	50.3 (1.98)	67.1 (2.64)	37.4 (1.47)	16.3 (0.64)	6.9 (0.27)	3.9 (0.15)	2.1 (0.08)	8.7 (0.34)	29.7 (1.17)	27.6 (1.09)	35.2 (1.39)	321.2 (12.64)
Source: National Meteorology and Hydrology Service of Peru
