= Morropón District =

Coordinates: 5.1843°S 79.9717°W

Morropón
- District
- Interactive map of Morropón
- Country: Peru
- Region: Piura
- Province: Morropón
- Founded: January 2, 1857
- Capital: Morropón

Government
  - Mayor: Modesto Duberli Lopez Escalona

Area
  - Total: 169.96 km^{2} (65.62 sq mi)
- Elevation: 131 m (430 ft)

Population (2005 census)
  - Total: 14,729
  - Density: 86.662/km^{2} (224.45/sq mi)
- Time zone: UTC-5 (PET)
- UBIGEO: 200405

The Iglesia de San Isidro Labrador in the Plaza de Armas.

Morropón District is one of ten districts of the province Morropón in Peru.

== Climate ==
Climate data for Morropón, elevation 128 m (420 ft), (1991–2020)
Month	Jan	Feb	Mar	Apr	May	Jun	Jul	Aug	Sep	Oct	Nov	Dec	Year
Mean daily maximum °C (°F)	33.3 (91.9)	32.9 (91.2)	32.8 (91.0)	32.4 (90.3)	31.3 (88.3)	30.1 (86.2)	30.0 (86.0)	31.0 (87.8)	32.3 (90.1)	32.5 (90.5)	32.9 (91.2)	33.2 (91.8)	32.1 (89.7)
Mean daily minimum °C (°F)	21.8 (71.2)	22.7 (72.9)	22.5 (72.5)	21.3 (70.3)	19.6 (67.3)	17.9 (64.2)	16.8 (62.2)	16.5 (61.7)	16.7 (62.1)	17.3 (63.1)	18.2 (64.8)	20.0 (68.0)	19.3 (66.7)
Average precipitation mm (inches)	38.9 (1.53)	142.5 (5.61)	181.9 (7.16)	58.9 (2.32)	5.5 (0.22)	0.7 (0.03)	0.1 (0.00)	0.0 (0.0)	0.2 (0.01)	2.7 (0.11)	2.6 (0.10)	12.8 (0.50)	446.8 (17.59)
Source: National Meteorology and Hydrology Service of Peru
