= Chalaco District =

Coordinates: 5.0410°S 79.7959°W

Chalaco
- District
- Interactive map of Chalaco
- Country: Peru
- Region: Piura
- Province: Morropón
- Capital: Chalaco

Government
  - Mayor: Orlando Velasquez Calle

Area
  - Total: 151.96 km^{2} (58.67 sq mi)
- Elevation: 2,200 m (7,200 ft)

Population (2005 census)
  - Total: 9,989
  - Density: 65.73/km^{2} (170.3/sq mi)
- Time zone: UTC-5 (PET)
- UBIGEO: 200403

Chalaco District is one of ten districts of the province Morropón in Peru.
