= Santo Domingo District =

Coordinates: 5.0292°S 79.8760°W

Santo Domingo
- District
- Interactive map of Santo Domingo
- Country: Peru
- Region: Piura
- Province: Morropón
- Founded: November 4, 1887
- Capital: Santo Domingo

Government
  - Mayor: Carlos Lopez Jimenez

Area
  - Total: 187.32 km^{2} (72.32 sq mi)
- Elevation: 1,475 m (4,839 ft)

Population (2005 census)
  - Total: 8,010
  - Density: 42.8/km^{2} (111/sq mi)
- Time zone: UTC-5 (PET)
- UBIGEO: 200409

Santo Domingo District is one of ten districts of the province Morropón in Peru.

== Climate ==
Climate data for Santo Domingo, elevation 1,475 m (4,839 ft), (1991–2020)
Month	Jan	Feb	Mar	Apr	May	Jun	Jul	Aug	Sep	Oct	Nov	Dec	Year
Mean daily maximum °C (°F)	21.1 (70.0)	20.6 (69.1)	20.7 (69.3)	21.0 (69.8)	21.4 (70.5)	21.4 (70.5)	21.6 (70.9)	21.6 (70.9)	21.7 (71.1)	21.5 (70.7)	21.5 (70.7)	21.2 (70.2)	21.3 (70.3)
Mean daily minimum °C (°F)	14.6 (58.3)	14.3 (57.7)	14.5 (58.1)	14.8 (58.6)	15.2 (59.4)	14.9 (58.8)	14.9 (58.8)	15.0 (59.0)	14.9 (58.8)	14.8 (58.6)	14.7 (58.5)	14.6 (58.3)	14.8 (58.6)
Average precipitation mm (inches)	183.1 (7.21)	334.4 (13.17)	467.7 (18.41)	267.1 (10.52)	106.3 (4.19)	17.1 (0.67)	3.4 (0.13)	3.1 (0.12)	13.9 (0.55)	20.3 (0.80)	42.1 (1.66)	100.3 (3.95)	1,558.8 (61.38)
Source: National Meteorology and Hydrology Service of Peru
