= Huancabamba River (Piura) =

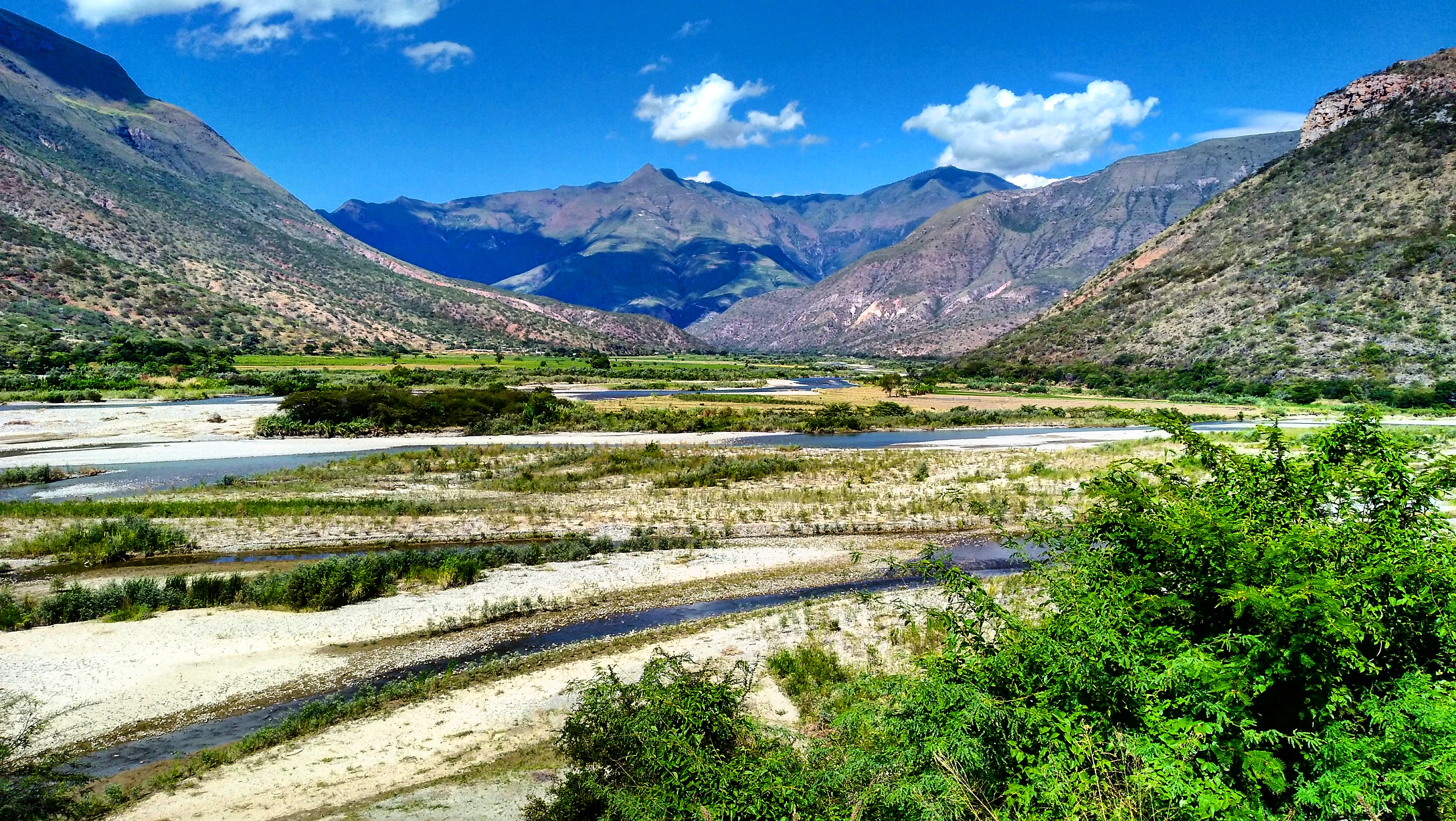

Location
- Country: Peru
- Department: Piura; Cajamarca
- Province: Huancabamba; Jaén; Cutervo
- District: Huancabamba

Physical characteristics
- Source: Peruvian Western Cordillera
- Mouth: Chamaya River
  - coordinates: 6°03′50″S 79°04′51″W

Basin features
- Cities: Huancabamba

The Huancabamba River originates in the northern part of Huancabamba Province (Piura Region) in Peru, near the border with Ecuador, within the Peruvian Western Cordillera. Its headwaters are located above Shimbe tarn at an altitude of approximately 3,450 meters above sea level (m.a.s.l.).

Huancabamba River belongs to the western Amazon basin of the Atlantic slope. It initially flows 100 km south through the mountains, passing through the 4-kilometre-long (2.5 mi) mountain lake Shimbe along its course. At kilometer 128, the river flows past the provincial capital, Huancabamba in Piura. From kilometer 89, the river forms the western and then the southwestern departmental boundary of Jaén Province.

At kilometer 39, the river features the Limón Dam, which diverts part of its flow towards Olmos in Lambayeque. From there, since 2014, approximately 400 million cubic meters of water per year have been transported to the western side of the Andes via the nearly 20-kilometre-long (12 mi) Transandino Tunnel for the Olmos Irrigation Project. Downstream from the dam, the river flows within the Cajamarca region. To the south of the lower basin lies Cutervo Province. The Huancabamba River then turns east-southeast. At kilometer 7, it passes the small town of Pucará on its left bank. Finally, the Huancabamba River converges with the Chotano River coming from the south, with which it joins to form the Chamaya River.
