= La Matanza District =

Coordinates: 5.2107°S 80.0884°W

La Matanza
- District
- Interactive map of La Matanza
- Country: Peru
- Region: Piura
- Province: Morropón
- Founded: November 5, 1964
- Capital: La Matanza

Government
  - Mayor: Nelson Mio Reyes

Area
  - Total: 1,039.46 km^{2} (401.34 sq mi)
- Elevation: 116 m (381 ft)

Population (2005 census)
  - Total: 13,349
  - Density: 12.842/km^{2} (33.261/sq mi)
- Time zone: UTC-5 (PET)
- UBIGEO: 200404

La Matanza District is one of ten districts of the province Morropón in Peru.
