= Italy–Peru relations =

- Italy: Peru

Diplomatic mission
- Embassy of Italy, Lima: Embassy of Peru, Rome

Italy–Peru relations (Italian: Relazioni Italia e Perù; Spanish: Relaciones Italia y Perú) are foreign relations and diplomatic ties between the Italian Republic and the Republic of Peru based on the Italian emigration previous centuries since the founding of the Viceroyalty of Peru. The largest Italian communities and their descendants are in Lima, Arequipa and Tacna. Both countries are members of the Latin Union, World Trade Organization and the United Nations.

== History ==
=== History until 1821 ===
The earliest Italians recorded in Peru were Simón Genovés and Pedro Milanés, who accompanied Francisco Pizarro in his Conquest of Peru, as well as Milanese Francisco Bosso, one of the founders of the city of Arequipa. Other Italians chronicled the events in early Peruvian history, such as Pizarro's assassination and early revolts. During the reign of Charles I, Italian immigration increased to differentiate them as desirable subjects in contrast to northern Europeans. The Italians ultimately consolidated their presence in the Viceroyalty of Peru during the 18th century.

The arrival of the House of Bourbon to the throne of Spain in the early 18th century meant the integration of Italian families into Spanish nobility, both in the peninsula and in its overseas territories, including the Americas, i.e. Spanish Peru.

=== History from 1821 to 1870 ===
After the independence of Peru, the new Peruvian state sought to establish a national identity and to attain international recognition, specifically from the United States and the states of the Italian Peninsula. News of the revolts in the Americas reached the latter starting in 1806, with the State of the Church condemning the events but doing little to support Spain in practice.

Before the unification of Italy, Peru formally established relations with the Holy See in 1852, with prior contacts taking place three decades prior due to a mission sent from Rome to South America. The establishment of relations with the Kingdom of the Two Sicilies and the Kingdom of Sardinia was also unsuccessfully attempted by Simón Bolívar, as these states initially showed no interest in challenging the status quo in Europe. However, due to Sardinian interests in overseas commercial contacts established by the former Republic of Genoa, annexed by the Kingdom in 1815 and homeland of most Italian Peruvians at the time, the latter's opinion changed in favour of Peru, leading to the signing of a treaty of Friendship, Commerce and Navigation on June 14, 1853. From 1841 to 1846, Luis Baratta acted as the first consul of Sardinia and the Papal States in Peru. He was then replaced in the Sardinian consulate by José Canevaro in 1846.

=== History from 1870 to 1906 ===
Peru recognised the Kingdom of Italy on April 7, 1862. On May 3, 1863, both states signed a 10-year consular agreement and in 1864 the Italian legation opened in Lima, replacing the Sardinian one. A treaty of commerce and navigation was signed on July 27, 1869, and an extradition agreement was signed on May 21, 1870. The former was modified and approved in 1874. Relations were formally established on December 23, 1874, with the signing of a Treaty of Friendship, Commerce and Navigation, although it was only approved by both parliaments in 1878.

During the Spanish–South American War (1865–1879), the Italian consul, Juan Antonio Migliorati, acted with the French consul, M. Lesseps, to prevent combat between both states, organising (under the auspices of then Foreign Minister, Toribio Pacheco), a confidential meeting in May 1866 with representatives from Peru, Bolivia and Chile where a peace proposal was presented to them, albeit unsuccessfully. This was done despite the consul's official position of neutrality, and in contrast to the Italian colony's support of the Peruvian cause and dislike of the consulate's position.

The capture of Rome in 1870 was strongly opposed by Peruvian society, who considered that Pope Pius IX had been kidnapped by the occupying troops. Despite the official neutrality of the Peruvian government, the Italian legation, headed by chargé d'affaires and consul general Hipólito Garrou, complained to the Ministry of Foreign Affairs due to the publication of a protest by prominent Peruvian Catholics in the newspaper La Sociedad, which included members of the government such as Minister of Finance Nicolás de Piérola, Minister of Government Manuel Santa María, and Foreign Minister José Jorge Loayza. The complaint was solved after the Foreign Ministry notified the president of the Catholic Society, who authored the protest, of "its conformity with the principles of the document, but its disagreement with the language used against the Italian government and people".

From 1840 to 1880, a wave of Italian immigration reached Peru, with the 1857 census of Lima numbering the community at 3,469 people. In contrast to other colonies, the Italians assimilated easily into Peruvian society, with a local motto, "the Italian on the corner", referencing the commercial nature of the community in Lima. Colonisation attempts were made again by Peru starting in 1872, with the establishment of the Society of European Immigration, whose efforts varied in success.

After the ascension to the throne of Victor Emmanuel II, Italian interests in the Americas increased. After the end of Peru's Guano Era, the interests of the Peruvian government became focused on saltpeter. The nationalisation of most reserves in southern Peru negatively impacted foreign investors, including a small number of Italians, who later were able to regain a small number of the reserves. These events led to British, French and Italian support for Chile during the War of the Pacific. The latter's support was weak in comparison to the other countries'. A mediation attempt by European countries that included Italy was attempted early in the war, although these fell out of favour after the United States offered its services instead. This was due to the former bloc's peace proposal including the cession of Tarapacá to Chile, while the American proposal did not mention this aspect.

Nominally, consular agents that made their presence known were to be untouched, leading to Italians seeking refuge in buildings that flew the Italian flag. This was, however, not respected by Chilean troops. In Tacna, the house of consul Giovanni Raffo was occupied by Chilean troops searching for Peruvian soldiers. This led to a written protest by the consul on May 30, 1880. Similar letters were sent from neighbouring Arica and Lima, the latter occupied in 1881.

Other colonies were guarded by warships sent by their countries to the Peruvian coast. The Italian government's poor response in the form of the arrival of three minor ships, among them two old corvettes, saw the Italian committee writing directly to the King on August 15, 1881. An international coalition met with Chilean representatives, with their ships idling outside of the capital city to prevent looting and rioting, as had happened in the southern provinces.

During this period, the Italian colony followed the example of their diplomatic representatives, flying the flag of Italy from their businesses and seeking documents to validate their Italian origin to protect their property from Chilean troops. One example was Antonio Raimondi, who asked for his documents to protect his collections of minerals and plants. Other members chose to support the Peruvians in places such as hospitals. One of the most notable contributions during this period was that of the Italian firefighter corps, who acted, in addition to their regular duties, as a law enforcement agency during the occupation. For this support, eleven firemen were executed by a Chilean firing squad. These efforts were recognised by the Peruvian government in 1892.

After the war, relations between both states revolved around the property lost by the Italian colony during the conflict and the struggle for power between Andrés Avelino Cáceres and Nicolás de Piérola, with the Italians seeking compensation with varying success until 1893, when the Peruvian government started to work on the issue. In 1899, Foreign Minister Manuel M. Gálvez met with the Italian Envoy, Giuseppe Pirrone, to discuss the arbitration of the Spanish representative, Ramiro Gil de Uribarri, to finally solve the issue.

During this period, Italian investment increased and two treaties were signed in 1889 and 1893. The former was regarding the exchange of marital records and the latter was a consular agreement. An arbitration treaty was also signed in 1905 between Foreign Minister Javier Prado y Ugarteche and Italian envoy Tomás Carletti. With the arrival of the 20th century, the Italian representative in Lima, Giovanni Viviani, began efforts to further diplomatic relations.

=== History from 1906 to 1945 ===
During World War I, Peru supported Italy against Germany and Austria–Hungary, with whom relations were broken in 1917 and a state of war was declared due to the German sinking of the Peruvian ship Lorton. After the war, Italo-Peruvian trade increased and the Peruvian government sent medals to Rome congratulating Italy's territorial gains. In response, the Italian representative personally thanked the Peruvian president. Regarding bilateral treaties, a 20-year gap took place between the signing of a postal agreement in 1912 and a navigation agreement in 1932.

Two diplomatic incidents took place during this period: the Canevaro case, a lawsuit regarding the nationality of an individual that reached the court in the Hague, and the political asylum of vice president Roberto Leguía in the Italian embassy in Lima due to the coup d'état carried out by Óscar R. Benavides two days prior. Both situations implied a constant communication between Foreign Minister Fernando Gazzani and Italian envoy Rufillo Agnoli.

During the 1930s, when Italy was under the government of Benito Mussolini, relations improved as they ceased to be distant or indirect, with both countries dedicating time to each other due to differing reasons. Fascism, a new ideology at the time, found popularity in Peruvian political, academic and journalistic circles. This popular reception was a major driving force of the improvement of relations. It is worth noting however, that the ideology arrived to Peru not through Italy proper, but through the writings of José Antonio Primo de Rivera. President Luis Miguel Sánchez Cerro himself was a member of Revolutionary Union, a fascist party that became more similar to its Italian counterpart after Luis A. Flores assumed its presidency.

After Sánchez Cerro's death, Óscar R. Benavides was appointed by the Peruvian congress to become president a second time. Benavides had previously been minister plenipotentiary to Italy and his explicit sympathies to Italy caused the Italian legation, then under Vittorio Bianchi, to consider him a fascist, despite Benavides' lack of explicit support for the movement. The following Italian minister plenipotentiary, Giuseppe Talamo, who was in office from 1936 to 1938, followed his predecessor's footsteps, although he later became more skeptical due to Benavides' lack of adhesion to the movement. Other major fascist figures in Peru were José de la Riva-Agüero y Osma and Raúl Ferrero Rebagliati. The Italian colony in Lima, between 1935 and 1937, also showed sympathy for fascism. During the Second Italo-Ethiopian War, Peruvian press showed its support for the Italian cause, with Lima being the most enthusiastic for the Italian doctrine. Despite this, Peru did apply the sanctions imposed on Italy by the League of Nations until 1936.

Italy, a member of the League of Nations, also participated as a mediator during the Colombia–Peru War. A committee by the organisation had considered imposing sanctions on Peru due to its violation of the Salomón-Lozano Treaty, but this effort was opposed by Italy's intervention, which avoided the worsening of the Peruvian position in the international stage. During the conflict, Peru bought armament from Italy thanks to Benavides' sympathies and knowledge of the European state, and the reluctance of some providers to sell arms due to Colombia being the invaded country. A technical mission reached Peru on May 23, 1937, and a military one arrived on November 21. The latter trained the Peruvian Aeronautical Corps, which caused alarm in the United States.

With the start of World War II, the Peruvian government released a decree of neutrality on September 5, 1939. After the attack on Pearl Harbor and the German and Italian declarations of war against the United States, a meeting between the foreign ministers of the Americas was held in Rio de Janeiro. As a result, Peru severed its relations with Italy on January 24, 1942. As a result, the military mission was expelled in January 1942 and the Caproni aircraft factory was expropriated, among other things. In October 1944, Peru signed, alongside other Latin American countries, a document with its intention of reestablishing relations with Italy. Relations were thus renewed in November 1944. After the war, a new wave of Italian immigration reached Peru.

=== History since 1945 ===
Italy did not initially prioritise relations with Peru after the war. However, by the end of the 1980s, Italian interest in Peru was the second most important for the country, only surpassed by Argentina. During the latter half of the 20th century, a large number of treaties was signed between both countries.

== Diaspora ==
There are between 400,000 and 900,000 people of Italian descent living in Peru. Similarly, the Peruvian community in Italy are numbered at around 130,000 people.

== Resident diplomatic missions ==
- Italy has an embassy in Lima
- Peru has an embassy in Rome and consulates general in Rome, Florence, Genoa, Milan and Turin.
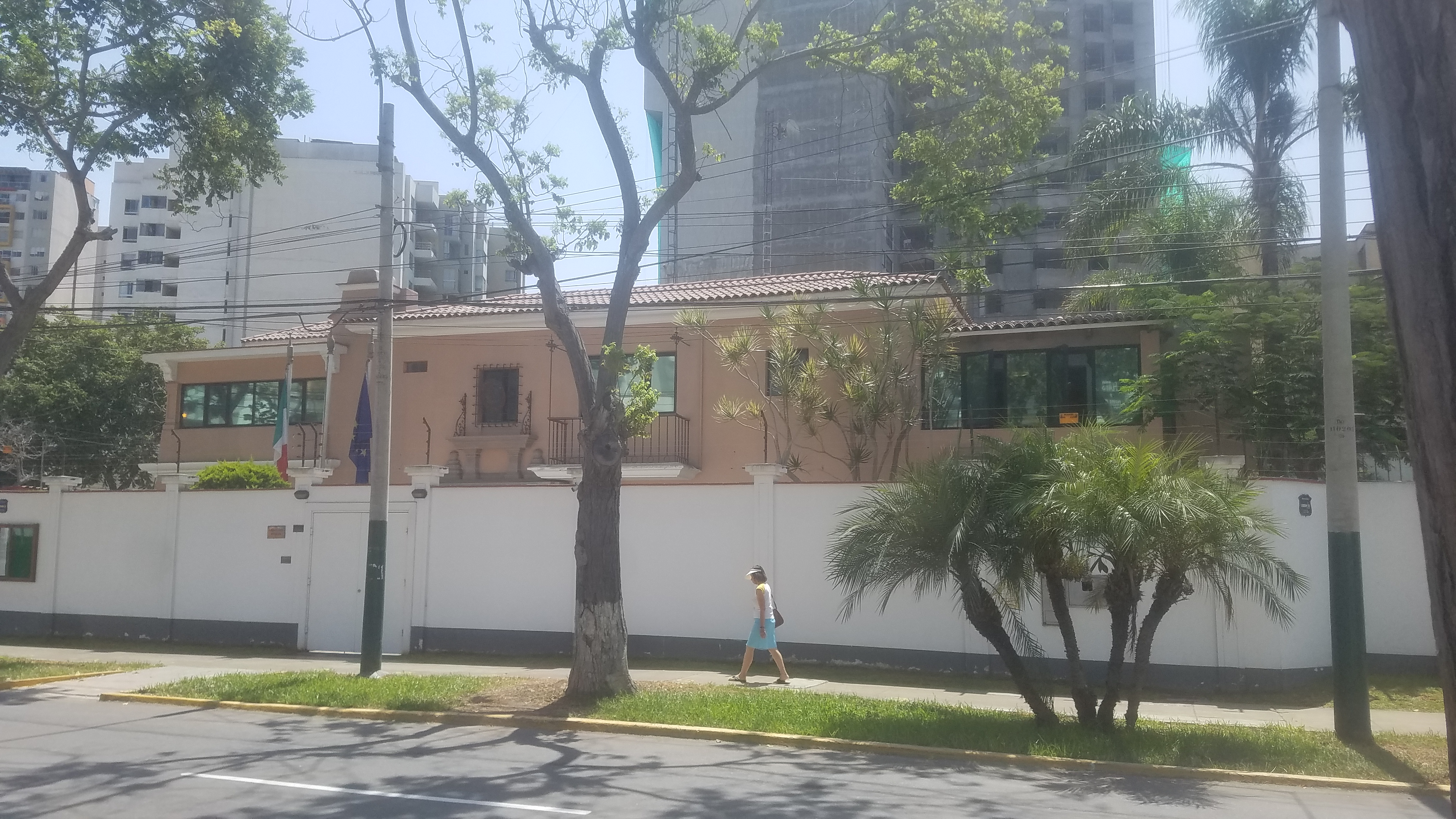
Embassy of Italy in Lima

== See also ==
- Foreign relations of Italy
- Foreign relations of Peru
- Italian Peruvians
- List of ambassadors of Italy to Peru
- List of ambassadors of Peru to Italy
