= Santa Catalina de Mossa District =

Coordinates: 5.1029°S 79.8849°W

Santa Catalina de Mossa
- District
- Interactive map of Santa Catalina de Mossa
- Country: Peru
- Region: Piura
- Province: Morropón
- Founded: May 22, 1958
- Capital: Paltashaco

Government
  - Mayor: Pedro Lopez Cruz

Area
  - Total: 76.76 km^{2} (29.64 sq mi)
- Elevation: 850 m (2,790 ft)

Population (2005 census)
  - Total: 4,512
  - Density: 58.78/km^{2} (152.2/sq mi)
- Time zone: UTC-5 (PET)
- UBIGEO: 200408

Santa Catalina de Mossa District is one of ten districts of the province Morropón in Peru.
