= El Carmen de la Frontera District =

Coordinates: 5.1483°S 79.4281°W

El Carmen de la Frontera
- District
- Interactive map of El Carmen de la Frontera
- Country: Peru
- Region: Piura
- Province: Huancabamba
- Founded: December 4, 1964
- Capital: Sapalache

Government
  - Mayor: Ismael Huayama Neira

Area
  - Total: 678.24 km^{2} (261.87 sq mi)
- Elevation: 2,450 m (8,040 ft)

Population (2005 census)
  - Total: 12,693
  - Density: 18.715/km^{2} (48.471/sq mi)
- Time zone: UTC-5 (PET)
- UBIGEO: 200303

El Carmen de la Frontera District is one of eight districts of the province Huancabamba in Peru.

== Climate ==
Climate data for Salala, El Carmen de la Frontera, elevation 2,974 m (9,757 ft), (1991–2020)
| Month | Jan | Feb | Mar | Apr | May | Jun | Jul | Aug | Sep | Oct | Nov | Dec | Year |
|---|---|---|---|---|---|---|---|---|---|---|---|---|---|
| Mean daily maximum °C (°F) | 16.9 (62.4) | 16.7 (62.1) | 16.8 (62.2) | 16.9 (62.4) | 16.8 (62.2) | 15.7 (60.3) | 15.4 (59.7) | 15.7 (60.3) | 16.2 (61.2) | 17.2 (63.0) | 18.1 (64.6) | 17.3 (63.1) | 16.6 (62.0) |
| Mean daily minimum °C (°F) | 7.3 (45.1) | 7.2 (45.0) | 7.6 (45.7) | 7.5 (45.5) | 7.6 (45.7) | 7.2 (45.0) | 6.9 (44.4) | 6.6 (43.9) | 6.9 (44.4) | 7.0 (44.6) | 6.8 (44.2) | 7.1 (44.8) | 7.1 (44.9) |
| Average precipitation mm (inches) | 115.7 (4.56) | 119.5 (4.70) | 128.7 (5.07) | 110.2 (4.34) | 92.3 (3.63) | 64.7 (2.55) | 58.3 (2.30) | 32.2 (1.27) | 33.8 (1.33) | 87.5 (3.44) | 87.4 (3.44) | 101.6 (4.00) | 1,031.9 (40.63) |
Source: National Meteorology and Hydrology Service of Peru
