= Morropón province =

Coordinates: 5.097523°S 80.162104°W

Morropón
- Province
- Flag Coat of arms

- Location of Morropón in the Piura Region
- Country: Peru
- Region: Piura
- Founded: 1936
- Capital: Chulucanas

Government
  - Mayor: Fermin Edilberto Farias Zapata (2007)

Area
  - Total: 3,817.92 km^{2} (1,474.11 sq mi)

Population
  - Total: 163,181
  - Density: 42.7408/km^{2} (110.698/sq mi)
- UBIGEO: 2004
- Website: www.munichulucanas.gob.pe

Morropón is one of eight provinces of the Piura Region in Peru. The province was created in 1936. Its administrative center is in the town of Chulucanas.

== Boundaries ==
- North province of Ayabaca
- East province of Huancabamba
- South Lambayeque Region
- West province of Piura

== Political division ==
The province is divided into ten districts:

- Chulucanas (seat)
- Buenos Aires
- Chalaco
- La Matanza
- Morropón
- Salitral
- San Juan de Bigote
- Santa Catalina de Mossa
- Santo Domingo
- Yamango

== Geography ==
The territory of the province is divided into two by the Piura River. It has many medicinal lagoons that are located on the Cerro Negro, 6 kilometres (4 mi) from the Chalaco District, also close to the village of Inapampa, which contains a natural viewpoint.

On the other side is located the famous dance of tondero, which originates from colonial days and that gives the province of Morropon the recognition of being "The Capital of Tondero".

== Weather ==
This province is located in the center of the Piura Region, being a land of contrast and climatic fusion. It is dotted by tropical forests of the dry-equatorial style in its flat areas were the carob tree predominates. In high areas of an elevation 1,500 to 2,000 metres (4,900–6,600 ft) the landscape changes to smooth high jungle and a lack of varied hilly valleys.

Its climate is dry-tropical in lower areas. In the winter the temperatures range from 17 °C and 27 °C. The summers are more humid and subject to high temperatures that can exceed 38 °C in the months of January, February, and March. In the high valleys located at an elevation between 1500 and 2000 meters, the climate is more humid and tropical and the style of high jungle but they maintain less than the summer. The part of the Canchaque mountain range and district of Yamango are temperate and they stay around the 23-24 °C all year although it can lower to 15 °C at nights.

Morropón is known for its lemons. The criollo mango of the dry-tropical is also a large export.
