= Olmos District =

Olmos
- District
- Interactive map of Olmos
- Coordinates: 06°03′51″S 80°04′23″W
- Country: Peru
- Region: Lambayeque
- Province: Lambayeque
- Capital: Olmos

Government
  - Mayor: Daniel Rivera Pasco (2023 - 2026)

Area
  - Total: 5,335.25 km^{2} (2,059.95 sq mi)
- Elevation: 175 m (574 ft)

Population (2017)
  - Total: 46,484
  - Density: 8.7126/km^{2} (22.566/sq mi)
- Time zone: UTC-5 (PET)
- UBIGEO: 140308

Olmos District is one of twelve districts of the province Lambayeque in Peru.

== History ==
The name of the district comes from the town of Olmos, meaning "elms", because the pale bark of the trees in the surrounding forest reminded the Spanish settlers of the elm trees back in Spain. At the time of the arrival of the Spaniards the area was occupied by the Quechuas and the extensive region of Olmos was administered by the Kingdom (curacazgo) of Copiz, which was under the Inca Empire. The pre-existing town was recognized in 1544 by the viceroy Blasco Núñez Vela.

== Hydrographics ==
The major river in the district is the Olmos River. Other important rivers are the Cascajal River, the Insculás River, the Ñaupe River, and the San Cristóbal River. The Limón Dam is part of the Olmos irrigation project which is intended to irrigate dry region west of the Andes by damming the flood-prone Huancabamba River.

== Climate ==
Climate data for Pasabar, Olmos, elevation 124 m (407 ft), (1991–2020)
Month	Jan	Feb	Mar	Apr	May	Jun	Jul	Aug	Sep	Oct	Nov	Dec	Year
Mean daily maximum °C (°F)	33.4 (92.1)	33.6 (92.5)	33.5 (92.3)	33.1 (91.6)	31.6 (88.9)	29.7 (85.5)	29.6 (85.3)	30.0 (86.0)	31.5 (88.7)	31.6 (88.9)	32.0 (89.6)	33.2 (91.8)	31.9 (89.4)
Mean daily minimum °C (°F)	21.3 (70.3)	22.3 (72.1)	22.0 (71.6)	20.5 (68.9)	18.8 (65.8)	17.4 (63.3)	15.8 (60.4)	15.2 (59.4)	15.6 (60.1)	16.2 (61.2)	17.0 (62.6)	19.0 (66.2)	18.4 (65.2)
Average precipitation mm (inches)	18.9 (0.74)	98.7 (3.89)	149.6 (5.89)	33.3 (1.31)	8.0 (0.31)	0.3 (0.01)	0.4 (0.02)	0.1 (0.00)	0.3 (0.01)	4.5 (0.18)	5.5 (0.22)	5.1 (0.20)	324.7 (12.78)
Source: National Meteorology and Hydrology Service of Peru
