= Huarmaca District =

Coordinates: 5.5678°S 79.5240°W

Huarmaca
- District
- Interactive map of Huarmaca
- Country: Peru
- Region: Piura
- Province: Huancabamba
- Founded: October 8, 1840
- Capital: Huarmaca

Government
  - Mayor: Martires Lizana Santos

Area
  - Total: 1,908.22 km^{2} (736.77 sq mi)
- Elevation: 2,194 m (7,198 ft)

Population (2005 census)
  - Total: 38,209
  - Density: 20.023/km^{2} (51.860/sq mi)
- Time zone: UTC-5 (PET)
- UBIGEO: 200304

Huarmaca District is one of eight districts of the province Huancabamba in Peru.

== Climate ==
Climate data for Huarmaca, elevation 232 m (761 ft), (1991–2020)
Month	Jan	Feb	Mar	Apr	May	Jun	Jul	Aug	Sep	Oct	Nov	Dec	Year
Mean daily maximum °C (°F)	17.9 (64.2)	17.9 (64.2)	18.7 (65.7)	19.3 (66.7)	20.2 (68.4)	21.0 (69.8)	21.4 (70.5)	21.8 (71.2)	21.3 (70.3)	20.2 (68.4)	19.6 (67.3)	18.8 (65.8)	19.8 (67.7)
Mean daily minimum °C (°F)	12.1 (53.8)	12.6 (54.7)	12.9 (55.2)	13.1 (55.6)	12.8 (55.0)	12.6 (54.7)	12.6 (54.7)	12.8 (55.0)	12.6 (54.7)	12.1 (53.8)	11.8 (53.2)	11.9 (53.4)	12.5 (54.5)
Average precipitation mm (inches)	128.7 (5.07)	252.0 (9.92)	278.6 (10.97)	160.8 (6.33)	52.9 (2.08)	9.6 (0.38)	3.6 (0.14)	3.0 (0.12)	8.4 (0.33)	27.3 (1.07)	36.4 (1.43)	75.4 (2.97)	1,036.7 (40.81)
Source: National Meteorology and Hydrology Service of Peru
