= Luis Solari Tudela =

Peruvian ambassador

His Excellency Luis Solari Tudela
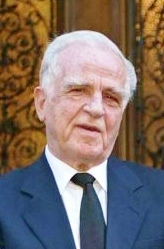

Ambassador of Peru to the United Kingdom
- In office 6 October 2004 – 27 July 2006
- President: Alejandro Toledo
- Preceded by: Armando Lecaros de Cossío
- Succeeded by: Ricardo Luna Mendoza

Ambassador of Peru to the Holy See
- In office 1992–1995
- President: Alberto Fujimori
- Preceded by: Hubert Wieland Alzamora
- Succeeded by: Augusto Antonioli Vásquez

Ambassador of Peru to the Holy See
- In office 1997 – 30 October 2000
- President: Alberto Fujimori
- Preceded by: Augusto Antonioli Vásquez
- Succeeded by: Alberto Montagne Vidal

Ambassador of Peru to Italy
- President: Alan García

Ambassador of Peru to Panama
- In office 1977–1982
- President: Francisco Morales Bermúdez

Personal details
- Born: 5 December 1935 Lima, Peru
- Died: 9 February 2013 (aged 77)
- Education: Pontifical Catholic University of Peru; Graduate Institute of International Studies
- Occupation: Diplomat

Luis Francisco Solari Tudela (5 December 1935 – 9 February 2013) was a Peruvian diplomat, lawyer and professor. He was an expert in the law of the sea and an elected member of the United Nations International Law Commission.

He is known for playing a key role in getting Peru and Chile to settle a long-running territorial dispute over an area of the Pacific Ocean by bringing it to the International Court of Justice, in what became the Chilean–Peruvian maritime dispute case. Solari Tudela proposed to Chile the international court as the preferable venue to resolve the maritime dispute.

== Biography ==
Luis Solari Tudela was born in Lima on 5 December 1935 to Luis Solari Saco and Rosa Mercedes Tudela Salmón. He graduated as a lawyer from the Pontifical Catholic University of Peru and completed his postgraduate studies at the Diplomatic Academy of Peru and at the Graduate Institute of International Studies in Geneva. He was married and had two children. He died on 9 February 2013.

=== Career ===
Solari Tudela joined the Peruvian diplomatic service in 1961, holding over the course of four and a half decades various senior positions in the Peruvian Ministry of Foreign Affairs, including ambassador to Panama (1977–1982), Italy (1985–?), the Holy See (1992–1995 and 1997–2000), and the United Kingdom (2004–2006). He was vice-minister of foreign relations from 2003 to 2004. In 2006, he left active diplomacy to dedicate himself to resolving the Chilean–Peruvian maritime dispute.
