= Limón Dam =

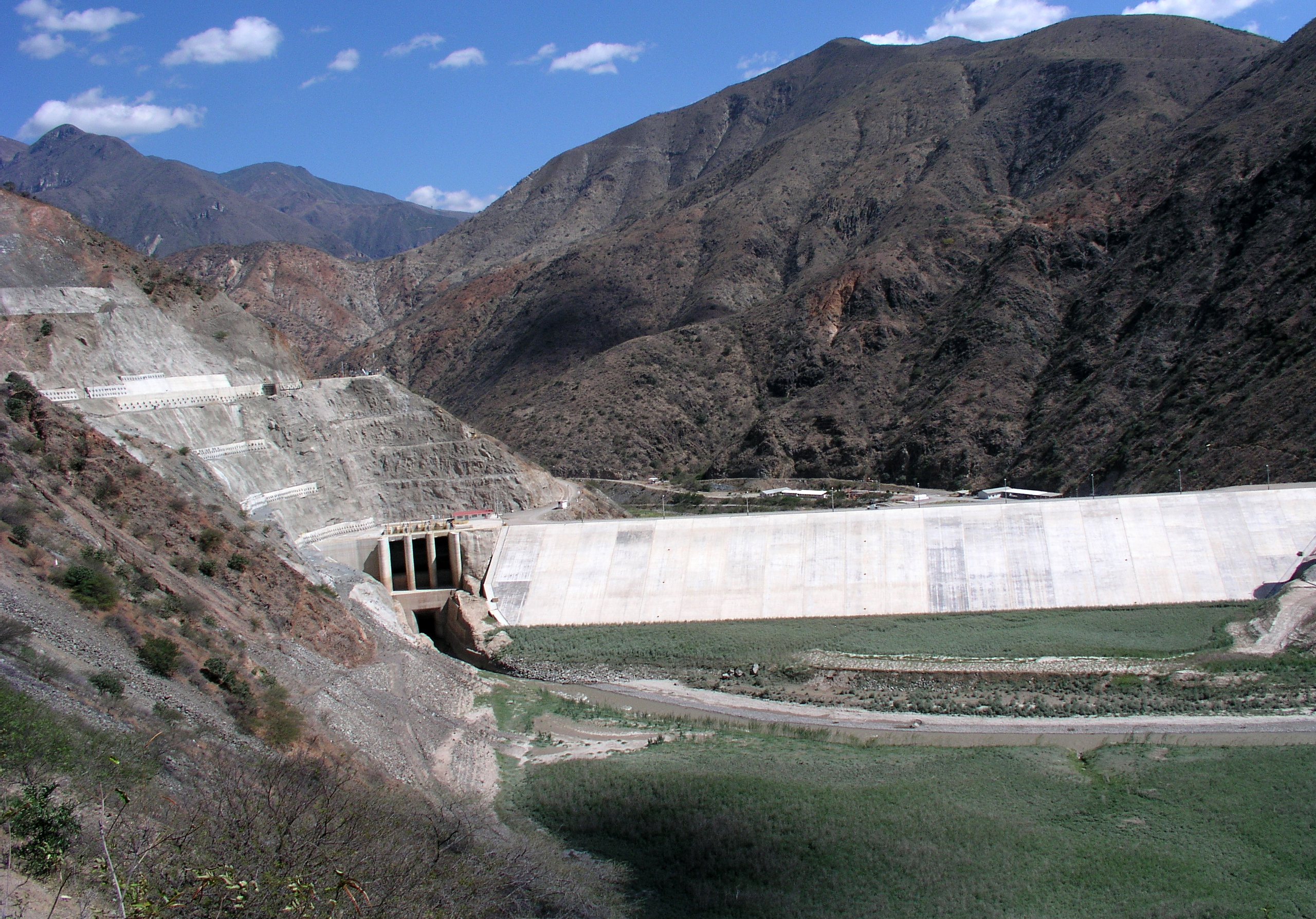

- Location within Peru
- Official name: Presa Limón; Proyecto Especial Olmos Tinajones (PEOT)
- Country: Peru
- Coordinates: 5°54′10.5″S 79°19′58″W
- Status: Operational
- Construction began: 2006
- Opening date: 2009
- Owner: PEOT - Regional Government of Lambayeque (GORE)
- Operator: Novonor

Dam and spillways
- Type of dam: Embankment, concrete-face rock-fill
- Impounds: Huancabamba River
- Height: 43 m (141 ft)
- Length: 320 m (1,050 ft)

Reservoir
- Creates: Limón
- Total capacity: 44×10^{6} m^{3} (36,000 acre⋅ft)
- Active capacity: 300×10^{6} m^{3} (240,000 acre⋅ft)
- Surface area: 275 ha (680 acres)

Power Station
- Installed capacity: 600 MW (800,000 hp) (max. planned)
- Annual generation: 4,000 GWh (14,000 TJ) (est.)

The Limón Dam, part of the Olmos Transandino Project, is a multi-purpose concrete-face rock-fill embankment dam on the Huancabamba River in northwestern Peru, located to the south of Guabal. The project helps produce 4,000 gigawatt-hours (14,000 TJ) of electricity per year and transfer water from the Cajamarca region west to Lambayeque, near Olmos for the reclamation and irrigation of 43,500 hectares (107,000 acres) of farmland. The greatest feature and engineering challenge of the project was digging the 20-kilometre (12 mi) trans-Andean tunnel as it connects the Atlantic side of the Andes (Amazon basin) with the Pacific side.

The Olmos Irrigation Project is the largest of seven irrigation projects in Peru.

== History and construction ==
The idea to divert the Huancabamba River to the fertile but arid lands of Olmos was first envisioned in 1924. The hydroelectric component was added in the 1940s and 1950s. Preliminary feasibility studies were conducted in the 1960s by Italconsult, in 1979-1982 soviet engineers from Hydroproject prepared and approved new design Tunnel excavation had been occurring since the 1950s and through the 1970s but work was halted in the 1980s due to a lack of funding. Construction on the project began in 2006 with the dam and Brazil's Odebrecht drilling the tunnel with a tunnel boring machine (TBM). Of the tunnel's 20 kilometres (12 mi) total length, 12.5 kilometres (7.8 mi) is being dug with a TBM. The dam was completed in 2009 and its reservoir began to impound the river. The tunnel was completed on 20 December 2011 with a ceremony attended by Peru's President Ollanta Humala. In June 2010, H2Olmos S.A. was awarded the contract for the irrigation system and it is expected to be operational in 2013. The contract for the hydroelectric component, which is planned to consist of two power stations, was awarded to Sindicato Energético S.A. in June 2010.

== Project characteristics ==
The water transfer accomplished by the Limón Dam on the Huancabamba River is diverted up to 2.05 million cubic metres (1,660 acre⋅ft) of water a year through the 20-kilometre (12 mi) Olmos Transandino tunnel to the Olmos River Valley. The Limón Dam is a 43-metre (141 ft) high, 320-metre (1,050 ft) long embankment dam that creates a reservoir of impounding 44 million cubic metres (36,000 acre⋅ft). Water diverted by the dam is transferred via the tunnel to the Olmos River where it will be used to irrigate 5,500 hectares (14,000 acres) of land. From there, water continues down the Olmos River where at two points, it will be used at hydroelectric power stations. At the base of the valley, water will settle in the Palo Verde Reservoir which will have a storage capacity of 790 million cubic metres (28×10^{9} cu ft). The Palo Verde Dam will serve as a diversion dam and shift water from the reservoir to the remaining 38,000 hectares (94,000 acres) of farmland.

== Popular culture ==
The project was profiled in the May 18, 2009 episode of Build it Bigger and the March 19, 2014 episode of Strip the City. It also featured in an episode of Mega Construction.
