= Lalaquiz District =

Coordinates: 5.2155°S 79.6800°W

Lalaquiz
- District
- Interactive map of Lalaquiz
- Country: Peru
- Region: Piura
- Province: Huancabamba
- Founded: December 30, 1983
- Capital: Tunal

Government
  - Mayor: Antonio Huamán

Area
  - Total: 138.95 km^{2} (53.65 sq mi)
- Elevation: 1,000 m (3,300 ft)

Population (2007 census)
  - Total: 5,115
  - Density: 36.81/km^{2} (95.34/sq mi)
- Time zone: UTC-5 (PET)
- UBIGEO: 200305

Lalaquiz District is one of eight districts of Huancabamba Province, Peru.

== History ==
Lalaquiz District was created by law on December 30, 1983, in Fernando Belaúnde's term.

== Authorities ==
=== Mayors ===
- 2011-2014: Antonio Francisco Huamán Huamán, Movimiento Agro Si.
- 2007-2010: Idelso Manuel Garcia Correa.

== See also ==
- Administrative divisions of Peru
