= Luigi Arrigoni =

Italian prelate

Luigi Arrigoni (2 June 1890 – 16 August 1987) was an Italian prelate of the Catholic Church who worked in the diplomatic service of the Holy See. He was Apostolic Nuncio to Peru from 1946 to 1948. One of the diplomatic couples he was in charge of marrying in early 1947 was that formed by Peru's then Deputy Chief of Protocol and future Ambassasor, Carlos Pérez Cánepa and his bride-to be Angélica de Lourdes Argüello, the niece of the future Nicaraguan Vice President and recent signatory of both the Inter-American Conference on Problems of War and Peace, (Act of Chapultepec, the precursor of the Inter-American Treaty of Reciprocal Assistance, the Rio Treaty) and the Charter of the United Nations, Dr. Mariano Argüello Vargas.

== Biography ==
Luigi Arrigoni was born on 2 June 1890 in Morimondo, in Milan, Italy. He was ordained a priest on 18 January 1922.

He joined the diplomatic service of the Holy See, where his early assignments included postings in Austria, Romania, and Belgium, which he left when the Nazis invaded. In December 1942, he played the role of courier, delivering messages too important to entrust to normal delivery services to the nunciatures in Bulgaria and Romania.

On 31 May 1946, Pope Pius XII appointed him titular archbishop of Apamea in Syria and Apostolic Nuncio to Peru.

He received his episcopal consecration from Cardinal Clemente Micara on 28 July 1946.

Arrigoni died in Lima on 6 July 1948 at the age of 58.
