= Juan Mariano de Goyeneche =

Peruvian diplomat and politician (1834–1924)

The Most Excellent The Count of Guaqui GE
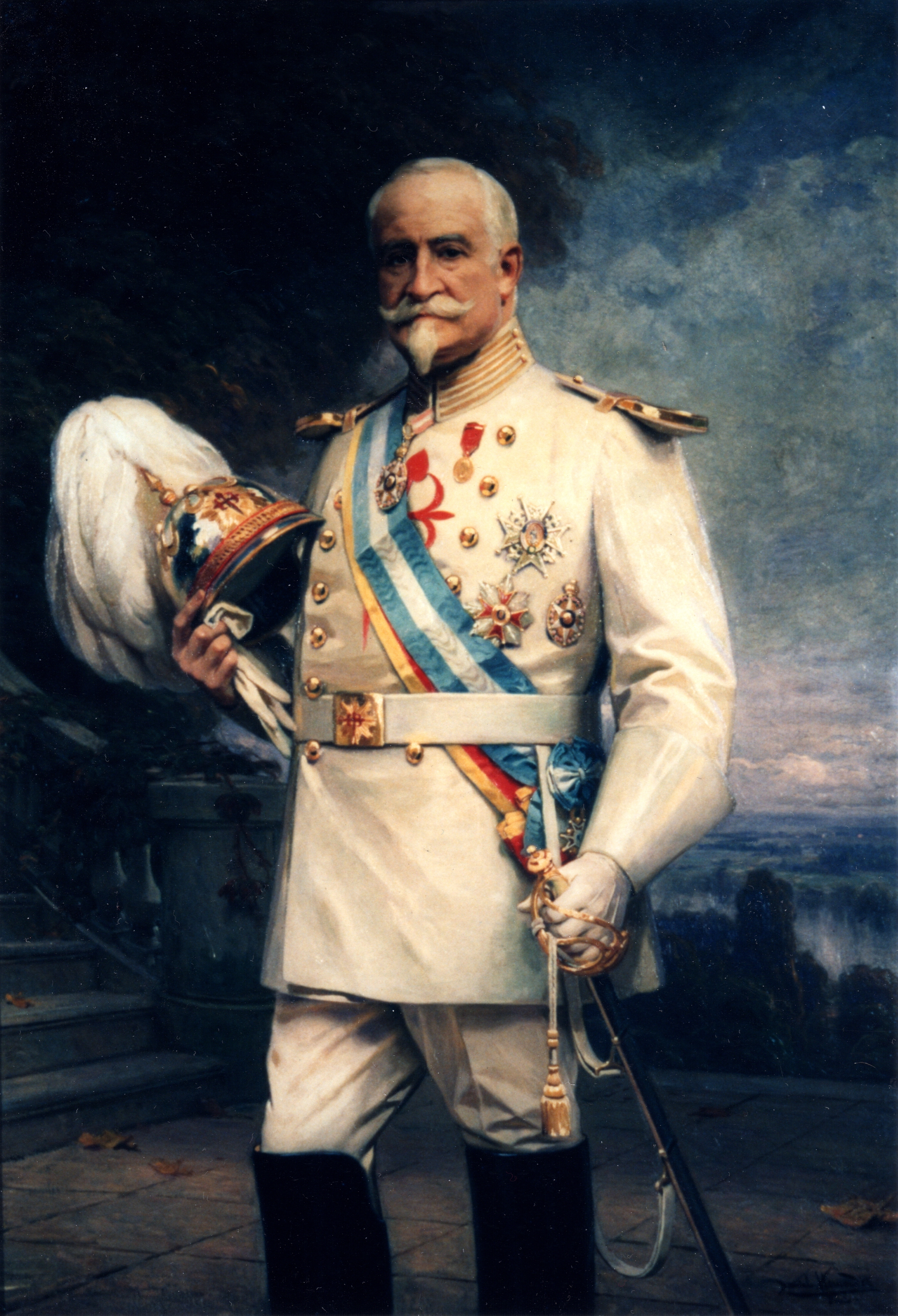
- Goyeneche in Santiago uniform wearing the sashs of the orders of Charles III and St. Gregory the Great, by Daniel Hernández Morillo, 1910

Personal details
- Born: Juan Mariano de Goyeneche y Gamio; 4 February 1834 Lima, Peru
- Died: 6 July 1924 (aged 90) San Sebastian, Spain
- Spouse(s): Juana de la Puente y Risco, 7th Marquise of Villafuerte
- Children: María, Marquise of Tamarit; Juan, 8th Marquis of Villafuerte; José Manuel, 7th Marquis of Corpa; Sebastián; Rosa, Duchess of Gor; Consuelo, Marquise of Zahara; Carlos; Lorenzo, 2nd Count of Gamio; Juana; Luis

Juan Mariano de Goyeneche y Gamio, 3rd Count of Guaqui (4 February 1834 – 6 July 1924), was a Peruvian diplomat and politician.

== Biography ==
Goyeneche was born in Arequipa into a prominent family. He was a nephew of the royalist general José Manuel de Goyeneche, who as commander-in-chief of Upper Peru defeated the revolutionary army in the battle of Huaqui and was created 1st Count of Guaqui by Fernando VII in 1817.

When the independence of Peru was declared in 1821, his parents decided to remain in the country. He was educated at the Seminary School of Arequipa, under his uncle Archbishop José Sebastián de Goyeneche, and the Seminary of Nobles at Bergara, Spain. He entered the diplomatic service as attaché at Peruvian legation in Madrid and during three years he received private classes by the jurist Eustaquio Laso, professor at the Central University of Madrid. In 1855 he was invested Knight of the Order of Santiago.

In 1859 he returned to Peru to devoted himself to the management of the family properties. The following year he was elected Deputy for Arequipa and was reelected in 1861, 1864 and from 1871 to 1874. When President Manuel Pardo offered him the Ministry of Interior, he refused it for political dissent and retired to Arequipa. In 1873 he and his family moved to Paris living in Castel Gamio (now Jardin des Tourneroches), a chateau at Saint-Cloud, where they remained several years.

In 1877 he was appointed Minister Plenipotentiary to France and likewise Minister Plenipotentiary to Spain and to the Holy See in 1879. He was President of the Peruvian Commission to the Exposition Universelle of 1878 and as Peruvian representative ratified the Treaty of Bern in 1879. That same year he promoted and signed the definitive Treaty of Peace that established diplomatic relations between Peru and Spain. In 1887 he was appointed Envoy and Minister Plenipotentiary to the Holy See, a post he retained until 1920 when was promoted to ambassador.

He died in 1924 in San Sebastián, Spain.

== Family ==
He married Juana de la Puente y Risco, 7th Marquise of Villafuerte, 2nd Countess of Casa Saavadra, in 1860 in Lima. They had eleven children:

1. María de Goyeneche y de la Puente (1862–1941), married José de Suelves, 9th Marquis of Tamarit
2. Juan de Goyeneche y de la Puente, 4th Count of Guaqui, 8th Marquis of Villafuerte (1863–1940)
3. José Manuel de Goyeneche y de la Puente, 7th Marquis of Corpa (1866–1839), married Pilar San Gil y Otal, 4th Countess of Ruiz de Castilla
4. Sebastián de Goyeneche (1867–)
5. Rosa María de Goyeneche y de la Puente (1870–1925), married Mauricio Álvarez de las Asturias Bohórques, 4th Duke of Gor
6. María del Consuelo de Goyeneche y de la Puente (1871–1966) married Francisco de Silva Bazán, 18th Marquis of Zahara
7. Carlos de Goyeneche y de la Puente (1880–1929), married Ana de Silvela de la Viesca
8. Lorenzo de Goyeneche y de la Puente, 2nd Count of Gamio (1939) married Carmen de Silva
9. Juana de Goyeneche (deceased in 1930)
10. Luis de Goyeneche, Papal Count (deceased in 1942), Captain of the Papal Noble Guard.
