= Canchaque District =

Coordinates: 5.3764°S 79.6063°W

Canchaque
- District
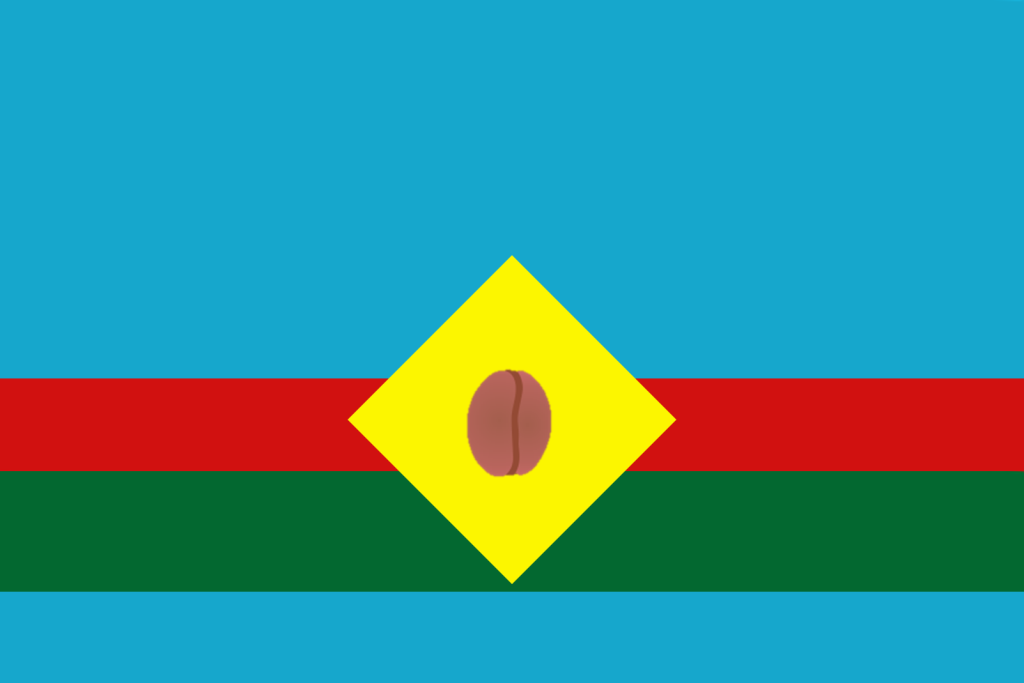
- Flag
- Interactive map of Canchaque
- Country: Peru
- Region: Piura
- Province: Huancabamba
- Founded: September 5, 1904
- Capital: Canchaque

Government
  - Mayor: Fidel Antonio Ramirez Vidarte

Area
  - Total: 306.41 km^{2} (118.31 sq mi)
- Elevation: 1,198 m (3,930 ft)

Population (2005 census)
  - Total: 9,242
  - Density: 30.16/km^{2} (78.12/sq mi)
- Time zone: UTC-5 (PET)
- UBIGEO: 200302

Canchaque District is one of eight districts of the province Huancabamba in Peru.
