= Buenos Aires District, Morropón =

Coordinates: 5.2671°S 79.9676°W

Buenos Aires District (named after the capital city of Argentina)
- District
- Interactive map of Buenos Aires District (named after the capital city of Argentina)
- Country: Peru
- Region: Piura
- Province: Morropón
- Founded: January 20, 1944
- Capital: Buenos Aires

Government
  - Mayor: Elvis Edgardo Jimenez Chinchay

Area
  - Total: 245.12 km^{2} (94.64 sq mi)
- Elevation: 135 m (443 ft)

Population (2005 census)
  - Total: 9,165
  - Density: 37.39/km^{2} (96.84/sq mi)
- Time zone: UTC-5 (PET)
- UBIGEO: 200402

Buenos Aires District is one of ten districts of the province Morropón in Peru.
