= Guabal, Cajamarca =

Guabal
- Village
- Location in Peru
- Coordinates: 5°52′57″S 79°21′4″W
- Country: Peru
- Region: Cajamarca Region

Guabal is a river village in the Huancabamba River valley, located on a western tributary of this river in northwestern Peru. It lies roughly 90 kilometres southwest of Jaén. The Limon Dam is located to the south.
