= Luis Mesones =

Peruvian lawyer, diplomat and politician

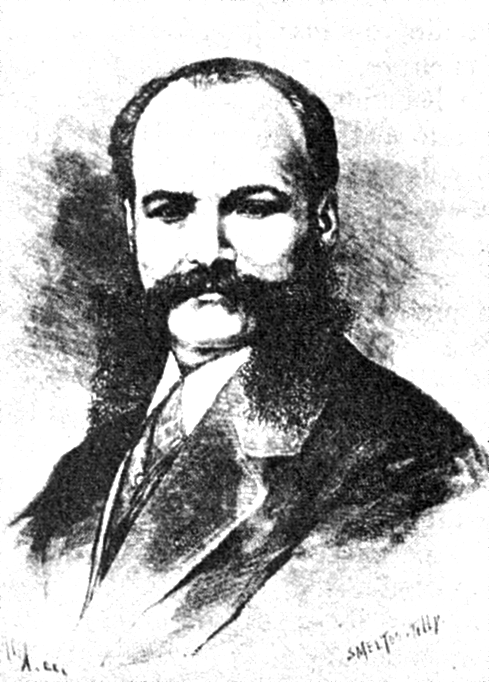
- Born: May 11, 1823; Huancabamba, Peru
- Died: December 16, 1879; Lima, Peru

José Luis Mesones Ubillús de la Cotera (Huancabamba, May 11, 1823 – Lima, December 16, 1879) was a Peruvian lawyer, diplomat, and politician. He carried out diplomatic representations in various countries in Europe and South America together with his son Manuel María Mesones. He was chargé d'affaires to the Holy See. For a few days in 1867, he was Minister of Foreign Affairs. He was also a national deputy for the province of Huancabamba and was part of the team that drafted the Political Constitution in that year when Mariano Ignacio Prado was provisional president.

== Biography ==
He studied at the National University of Trujillo, where he graduated with a bachelor's degree and a doctorate in jurisprudence in 1849. He then went to Lima and received his law degree from the Superior Court of Lima in 1850.

In 1851 he was appointed rector of the San Luis Gonzaga National School of Ica, whose reorganization he was in charge of after having been on recess. In 1855 he was elected substitute deputy for Ica and had to join the National Convention (constituent assembly). Likewise, in 1855 he was part of the group of founding members of the National Club, which was established in Lima.

In 1856 he was appointed secretary of the legation in France, taking charge of it in the absence of its owner, in 1858. The following year he became chargé d'affaires to the Holy See. He achieved the appointments of José Sebastián de Goyeneche y Barreda to the archbishopric of Lima He delivered the 21,000 soles that the Peruvian faithful had collected for the Holy See. He drafted a concordat that safeguarded the rights of the national board. And He initiated efforts to grant the cardinalate to Archbishop Goyeneche.

In 1862 he went to England as minister plenipotentiary. He was then accredited with the same position before the government of Italy which was established in Florence (1863–1866).

He was elected member of the Constituent Congress of 1867 for the province of Huancabamba during the government of Mariano Ignacio Prado. This congress issued the Political Constitution of 1867, the eighth that governed the country, and which was only valid for five months from August 1867 to January 1868. On June 3 of that same year, he was appointed Minister of Foreign Affairs but resigned the same day, being replaced by the head of Justice, Felipe Osorio. Those were the days of the provisional presidency of General Mariano Ignacio Prado.

From 1869 to 1872 he resumed his diplomatic function as minister plenipotentiary in Argentina, Uruguay, and Brazil. With the same investiture he became president of the Commission of Tax Delegates in Europe. He was responsible for supervising the actions of the guano consignees, and negotiated an arrangement with the Thomson, Bonar & Company. He resigned in 1877 and was replaced by Simón Gregorio Paredes.

== Publications ==
- Exposition of the Peruvian minister in France on the consignment of guano (1858).
- The Minister of Finance of Peru in his relations with the guano administrators in Europe (1859).
- Diplomacy and Congress (1864).
- National jurisdiction and independence of the Judiciary due to the murder of a sailor aboard the boat Emilio Rondanini (1869).
- Exhibition on the consignment of guano in Great Britain, Ireland and their colonies (1876).
- International issues. Local justice in its relations with the consuls general in charge of business (1878).
