= Yamango District =

Coordinates: 5.1809°S 79.7507°W

Yamango
- District
- Interactive map of Yamango
- Country: Peru
- Region: Piura
- Province: Morropón
- Founded: December 30, 1983
- Capital: Yamango

Area
  - Total: 216.91 km^{2} (83.75 sq mi)
- Elevation: 1,175 m (3,855 ft)

Population (2005 census)
  - Total: 9,840
  - Density: 45.4/km^{2} (117/sq mi)
- Time zone: UTC-5 (PET)
- UBIGEO: 200410

Yamango District is one of ten districts of the province Morropón in Peru.
