= Apostolic Nunciature to Peru =

Diplomatic Mission of the Holy See in Peru

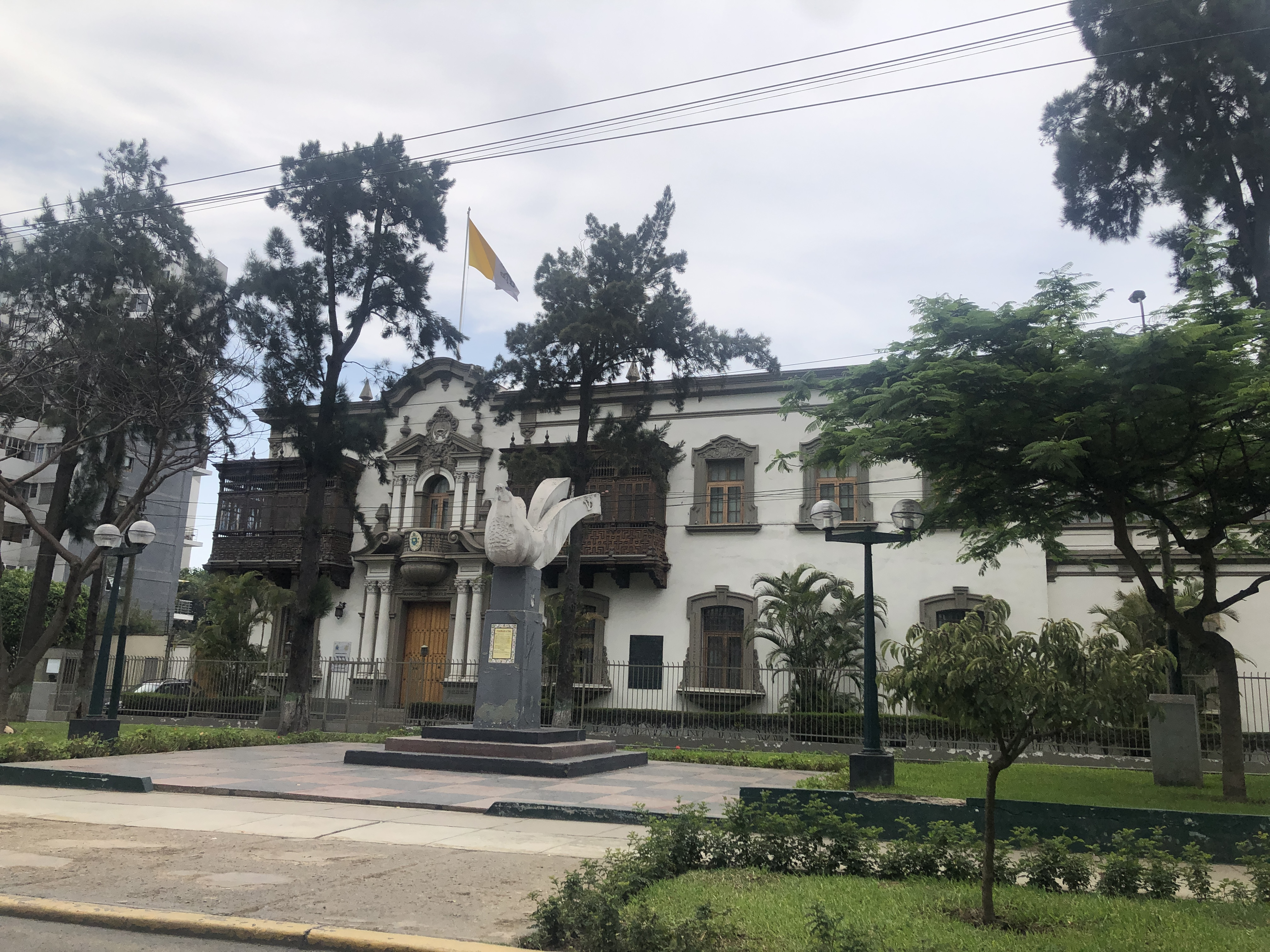
- Location: Lima, Peru
- Address: Avenida Salaverry № 600
- Coordinates: 12°4′16″S 77°2′29″W

The Apostolic Nunciature to the Republic of Peru is an ecclesiastical office of the Roman Catholic Church in Peru. It is a diplomatic post of the Holy See, whose representative is called the Apostolic Nuncio with the rank of an ambassador.

Papal representation was established in Peru by the Apostolic Delegation to Peru and Bolivia, a single office resident in Peru. As a delegation, it had no diplomatic status, but acted on behalf of the Holy See with respect to the Catholic Church in the region. This was then divided to create a nunciature for each country, a diplomatic office. Archbishop Angelo Giacinto Scapardini was named Apostolic Delegate to Peru and Bolivia in 1910. When he was assigned to his next diplomatic post in December 1916, he was described as Internuncio to Peru and Bolivia. Apostolic internuncio is a title given in anticipation of the establishment of diplomatic relations and the exchange of ambassadors. The Nunciature to Peru was established on 20 July 1917.

The Holy See and the government of Peru concluded a pact regulating their relations and certain aspects of the Church's status in Peru on 26 July 1980.

== List of papal representatives to Peru ==
=== Apostolic Delegates to Peru and Bolivia ===
- Serafino Vannutelli (23 July 1869 – 10 September 1875)
- Mario Mocenni (14 August 1877 – 28 March 1882)
- Cesare Sambucetti (18 April 1882 – 1882)
- Beniamino Cavicchioni (21 March 1884 – 1898)
- Pietro Gasparri (2 January 1898 – 25 April 1901)
- Alessandro Bavona (17 July 1901 – 13 November 1906)
- Angelo Maria Dolci (7 December 1906 – September 1910)
- Angelo Giacinto Scapardini (23 September 1910 – 4 December 1916)
  - His title became Apostolic Internuncio to Peru and Bolivia during his tenure as delegate.

=== Apostolic Nuncios ===
- Lorenzo Lauri (5 January 1917 – 25 May 1921)
  - Appointed Apostolic Internuncio; with the creation of the nunciature he became Apostolic Nuncio on 20 July 1917.
- Giuseppe Petrelli (27 May 1921 – 24 December 1926)
- Serafino Cimino (13 April 1926 – 4 May 1928)
- Gaetano Cicognani (15 June 1928 – 13 June 1935)
- Fernando Cento (26 July 1936 – 9 March 1946)
- Luigi Arrigoni (31 May 1946 – 6 July 1948)
- Giovanni Panico (28 September 1948 – 14 November 1953)
- Francesco Lardone (21 November 1953 – 30 June 1959)
- Romolo Carboni (2 September 1959 – 26 April 1969)
- Luigi Poggi (21 May 1969 – 1 August 1973)
- Carlo Furno (1 August 1973 – 25 November 1978)
- Mario Tagliaferri (15 December 1978 – 20 July 1985)
- Luigi Dossena (30 December 1985 – 2 March 1994)
- Fortunato Baldelli (23 April 1994 – 19 June 1999)
- Rino Passigato (17 July 1999 – 8 November 2008)
- Bruno Musarò (5 January 2009 – 6 August 2011)
- James Patrick Green (15 October 2011 – 6 April 2017)
- Nicola Girasoli (16 June 2017 – 2 July 2022)
- Paolo Rocco Gualtieri (6 August 2022 – present)

== List of representatives of the Sovereign Military Order of Malta ==
Peru and the Sovereign Military Order of Malta, a Catholic religious order, have formal relations since 1953. The former's embassy to the Holy See is also accredited to the Order, while the latter has an embassy in El Olivar, a neighbourhood of San Isidro District, Lima. It had been previously housed in different locations, including a palace in Arequipa Avenue, later demolished for the construction of a Plaza Vea supermarket.

- Georges Potocki (1953 – 1956)
- Olgierd Czartoryski (1956 – 1958)
- Tomás Díez Hidalgo (1958 – ?)
- Fernando de Trazegnies (1995 – 1998)
- Esteban Juan Caselli (19 December 2005 – ?)
- Antonio Carlos Da Silva Coelho (26 June 2008 – 2016)
- Fabrizio Francesco Vinaccia (16 May 2017 – present)

== See also ==
- Holy See–Peru relations
- List of ambassadors of Peru to the Holy See
