= Sondor District =

Coordinates: 5.3154°S 79.4101°W

Sondor Suntur
- District
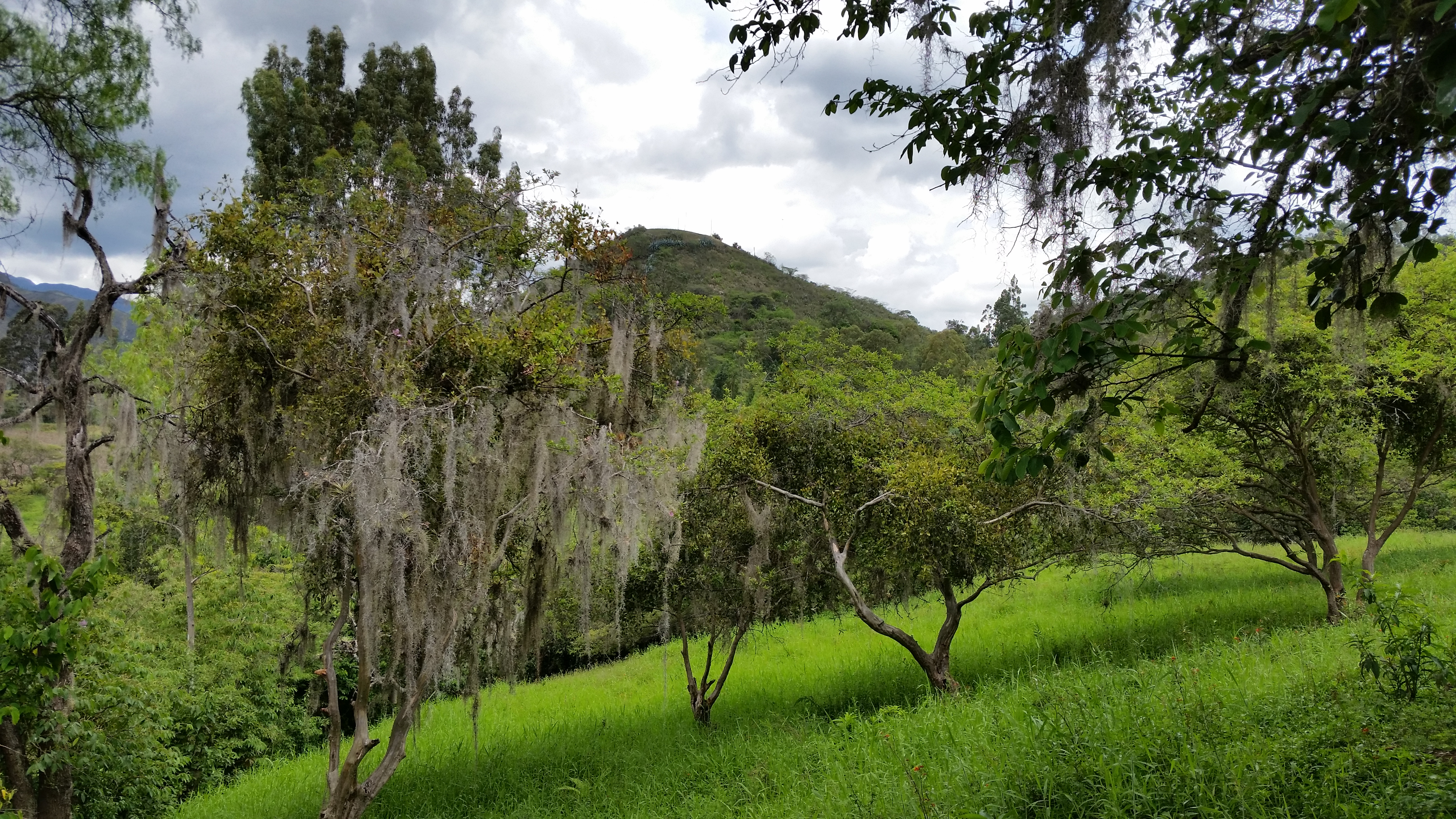
- Interactive map of Sondor
- Country: Peru
- Region: Piura
- Province: Huancabamba
- Founded: January 2, 1857
- Capital: Sondor

Area
  - Total: 347.38 km^{2} (134.12 sq mi)
- Elevation: 2,050 m (6,730 ft)

Population (2005 census)
  - Total: 8,486
  - Density: 24.43/km^{2} (63.27/sq mi)
- Time zone: UTC-5 (PET)
- UBIGEO: 200307

Sondor District is one of eight districts of the province Huancabamba in Peru.
