= Salitral District, Morropón =

Coordinates: 5.3421°S 79.8326°W

Salitral
- District
- Interactive map of Salitral
- Country: Peru
- Region: Piura
- Province: Morropón
- Founded: October 8, 1840
- Capital: Salitral

Government
  - Mayor: Raul Cardoza Gutierrez

Area
  - Total: 614.03 km^{2} (237.08 sq mi)
- Elevation: 162 m (531 ft)

Population (2005 census)
  - Total: 8,454
  - Density: 13.77/km^{2} (35.66/sq mi)
- Time zone: UTC-5 (PET)
- UBIGEO: 200406

Salitral District is one of ten districts of the province Morropón in Peru.

== Climate ==
Climate data for Malacasi, Salitral, elevation 153 m (502 ft), (1991–2020)
Month	Jan	Feb	Mar	Apr	May	Jun	Jul	Aug	Sep	Oct	Nov	Dec	Year
Mean daily maximum °C (°F)	33.8 (92.8)	33.1 (91.6)	32.9 (91.2)	32.8 (91.0)	31.9 (89.4)	30.8 (87.4)	30.8 (87.4)	31.6 (88.9)	32.8 (91.0)	32.8 (91.0)	33.0 (91.4)	33.6 (92.5)	32.5 (90.5)
Mean daily minimum °C (°F)	21.9 (71.4)	22.4 (72.3)	22.2 (72.0)	21.1 (70.0)	19.3 (66.7)	17.8 (64.0)	16.6 (61.9)	16.2 (61.2)	16.5 (61.7)	17.3 (63.1)	18.1 (64.6)	19.9 (67.8)	19.1 (66.4)
Average precipitation mm (inches)	60.0 (2.36)	191.0 (7.52)	247.4 (9.74)	73.4 (2.89)	9.1 (0.36)	0.6 (0.02)	0.1 (0.00)	0.1 (0.00)	0.5 (0.02)	3.8 (0.15)	3.2 (0.13)	6.7 (0.26)	595.9 (23.45)
Source: National Meteorology and Hydrology Service of Peru
