= Huancabamba District, Huancabamba =

Coordinates: 5°14′22″S 79°27′03″W

Huancabamba
- District
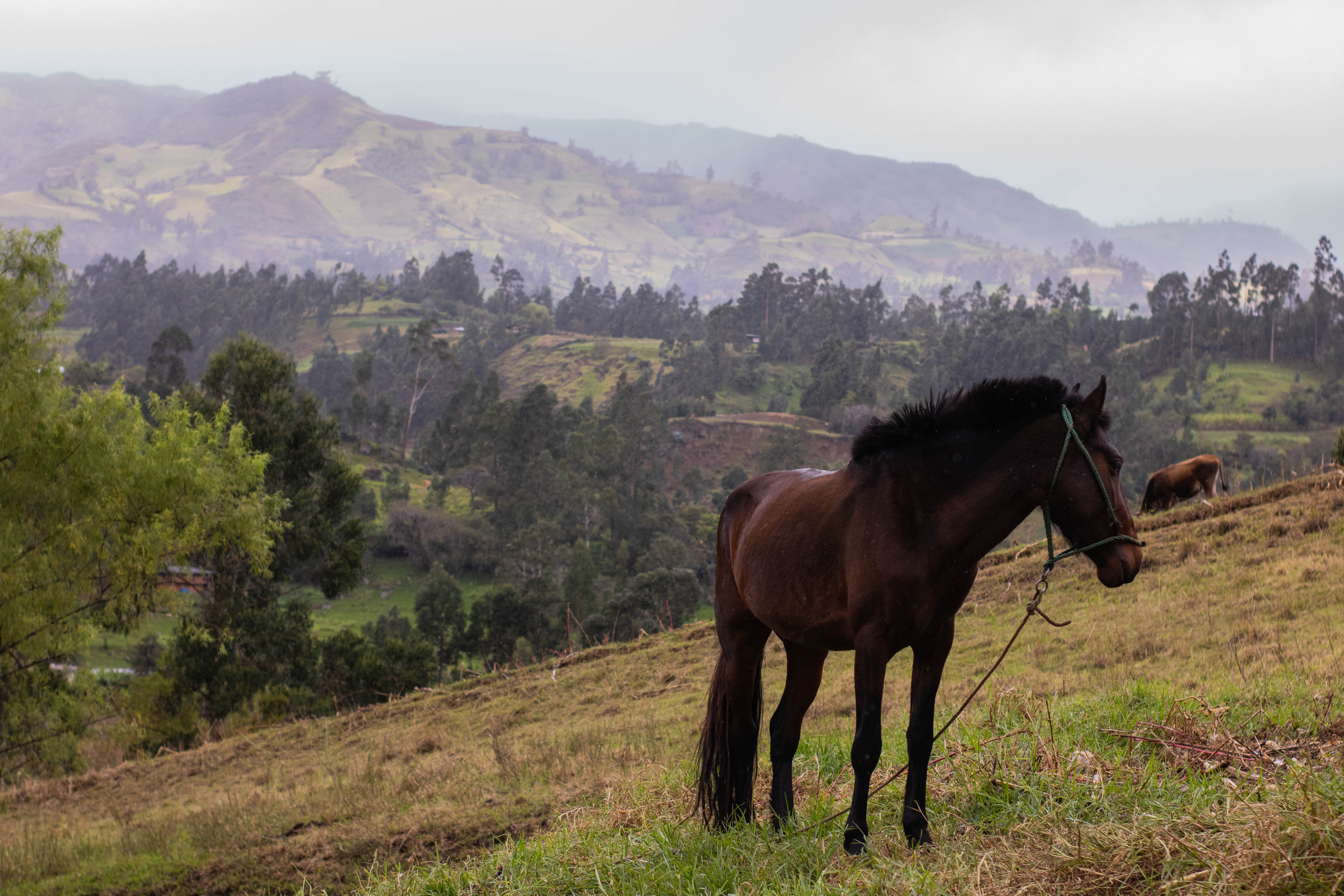
- Interactive map of Huancabamba
- Country: Peru
- Region: Piura
- Province: Huancabamba
- Capital: Huancabamba

Government
  - Mayor: Valentin Quevedo Peralta

Area
  - Total: 447.25 km^{2} (172.68 sq mi)
- Elevation: 1,929 m (6,329 ft)

Population (2005 census)
  - Total: 29,432
  - Density: 65.807/km^{2} (170.44/sq mi)
- Time zone: UTC-5 (PET)
- UBIGEO: 200301

Huancabamba District is one of eight districts of the province Huancabamba in Peru.

== Climate ==
Climate data for Huancabamba, elevation 1,959 m (6,427 ft), (1991–2020)
Month	Jan	Feb	Mar	Apr	May	Jun	Jul	Aug	Sep	Oct	Nov	Dec	Year
Mean daily maximum °C (°F)	24.4 (75.9)	24.0 (75.2)	24.2 (75.6)	24.4 (75.9)	24.2 (75.6)	23.6 (74.5)	23.5 (74.3)	23.9 (75.0)	24.6 (76.3)	25.4 (77.7)	26.1 (79.0)	24.9 (76.8)	24.4 (76.0)
Mean daily minimum °C (°F)	13.4 (56.1)	13.9 (57.0)	14.1 (57.4)	13.9 (57.0)	13.1 (55.6)	12.9 (55.2)	12.7 (54.9)	12.8 (55.0)	13.3 (55.9)	13.2 (55.8)	12.6 (54.7)	13.4 (56.1)	13.3 (55.9)
Average precipitation mm (inches)	56.3 (2.22)	71.3 (2.81)	88.0 (3.46)	63.6 (2.50)	33.8 (1.33)	14.9 (0.59)	11.2 (0.44)	6.9 (0.27)	13.4 (0.53)	44.2 (1.74)	53.1 (2.09)	55.0 (2.17)	511.7 (20.15)
Source: National Meteorology and Hydrology Service of Peru
