= Huancabamba =

Coordinates: 5°14′S 79°26′W

Huancabamba San Pedro de Huancabamba
- Village
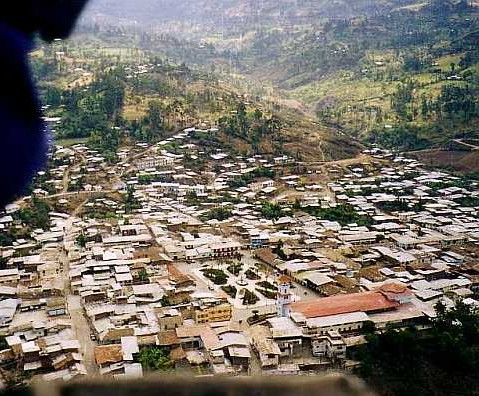
- Aerial view of the town

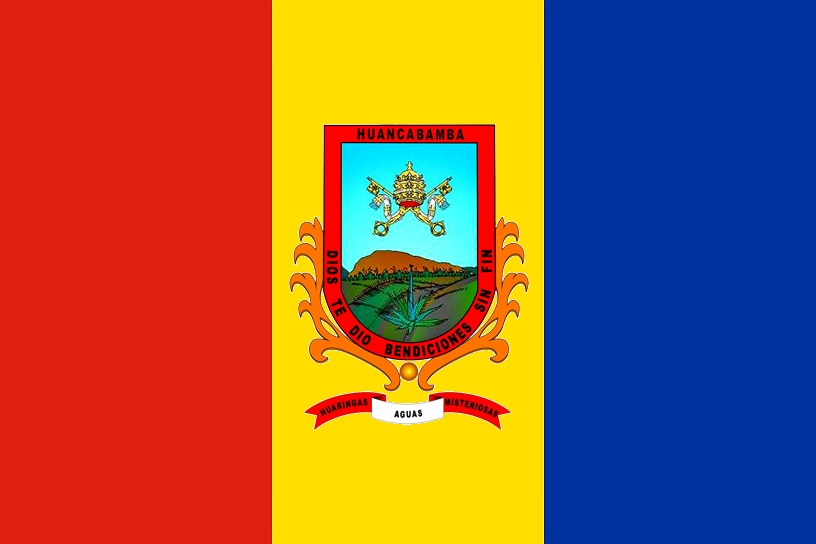
- Flag
- Interactive map of Huancabamba
- Country: Peru
- Region: Piura
- Province: Huancabamba
- District: Huancabamba

Government
  - Mayor: Valentin Quevedo Peralta
- Elevation: 1,929 m (6,329 ft)
- Time zone: UTC-5 (PET)

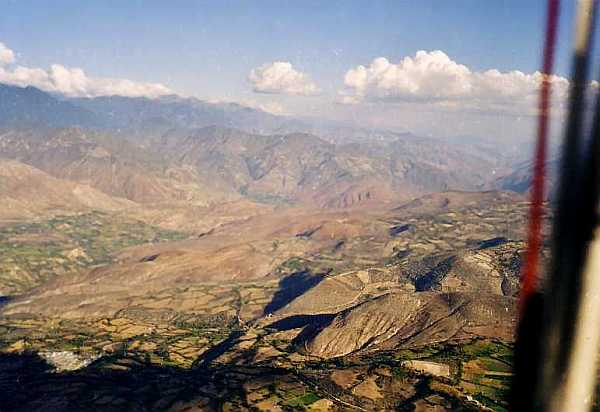
View into the Huancabamba valley

Huancabamba is a town in Northern Peru, capital of the province Huancabamba in the Piura region. It is situated in the valley of the Huancabamba river, along which the old Inca road passed leading from Quito to Cajamarca.

== Climate ==
Climate data for Huancabamba, elevation 1,959 m (6,427 ft), (1991–2020)
Month	Jan	Feb	Mar	Apr	May	Jun	Jul	Aug	Sep	Oct	Nov	Dec	Year
Mean daily maximum °C (°F)	24.4 (75.9)	24.0 (75.2)	24.2 (75.6)	24.4 (75.9)	24.2 (75.6)	23.6 (74.5)	23.5 (74.3)	23.9 (75.0)	24.6 (76.3)	25.4 (77.7)	26.1 (79.0)	24.9 (76.8)	24.4 (76.0)
Mean daily minimum °C (°F)	13.4 (56.1)	13.9 (57.0)	14.1 (57.4)	13.9 (57.0)	13.1 (55.6)	12.9 (55.2)	12.7 (54.9)	12.8 (55.0)	13.3 (55.9)	13.2 (55.8)	12.6 (54.7)	13.4 (56.1)	13.3 (55.9)
Average precipitation mm (inches)	56.3 (2.22)	71.3 (2.81)	88.0 (3.46)	63.6 (2.50)	33.8 (1.33)	14.9 (0.59)	11.2 (0.44)	6.9 (0.27)	13.4 (0.53)	44.2 (1.74)	53.1 (2.09)	55.0 (2.17)	511.7 (20.15)
Source: National Meteorology and Hydrology Service of Peru
