= Huancabamba province =

Coordinates: 5.239573°S 79.449641°W

Huancabamba
- Province
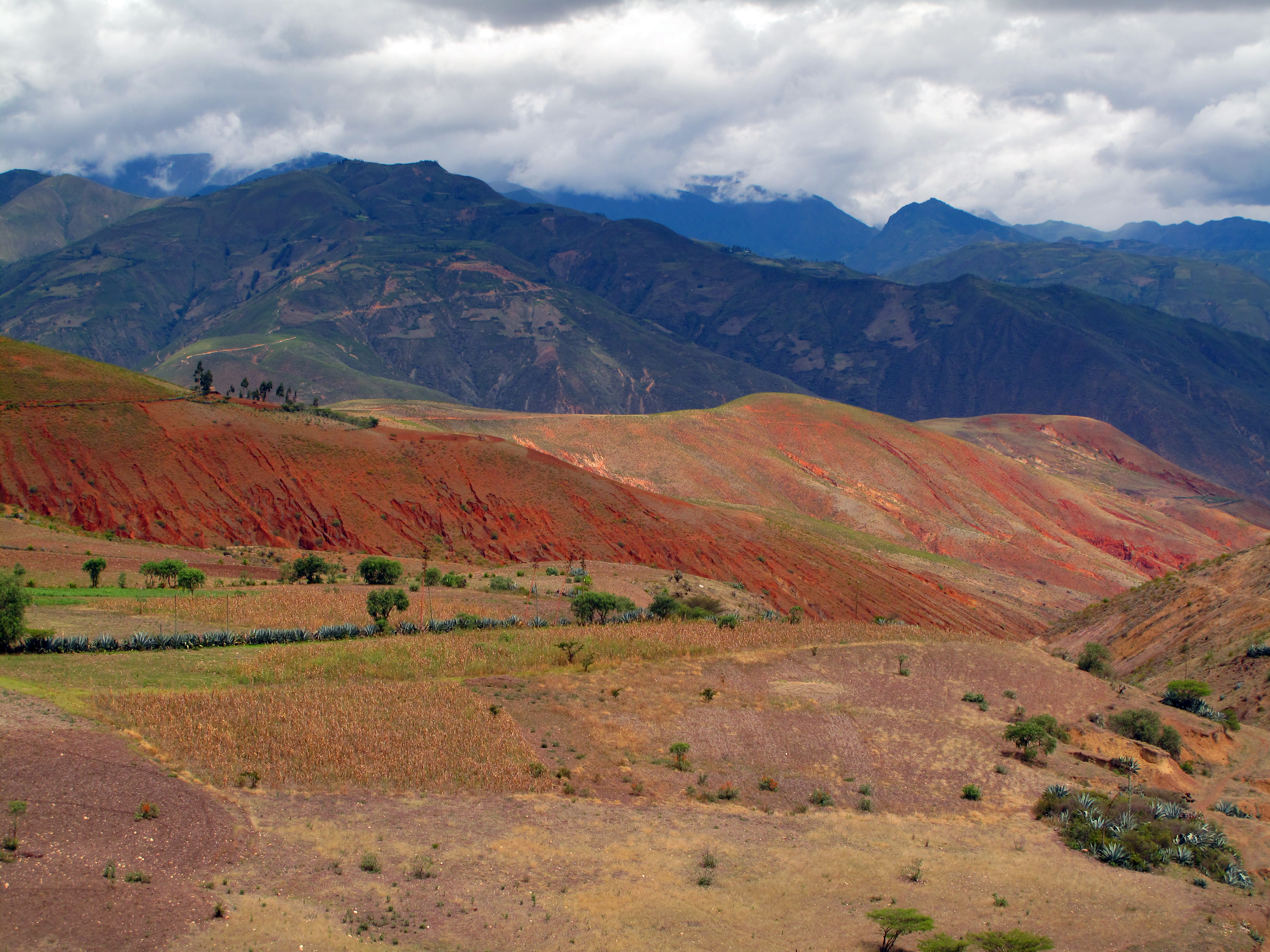
- Soil erosion south of Huancabamba

- Location of Huancabamba in the Piura Region
- Country: Peru
- Region: Piura
- Founded: March 20, 1861
- Capital: Huancabamba

Government
  - Mayor: Marco Napoleón Velasco García

Area
  - Total: 4,254.14 km^{2} (1,642.53 sq mi)
- Elevation: 1,929 m (6,329 ft)

Population
  - Total: 123,456
  - Density: 29.0202/km^{2} (75.1620/sq mi)
- UBIGEO: 2003

Huancabamba is a landlocked province in the Piura Region in northwestern Peru. The province is the easternmost in the region.

== Boundaries ==
- North Ecuador
- East Cajamarca Region
- South Lambayeque Region
- West province of Ayabaca

== Political division ==
The Province has an area of 4,254.14 square kilometers (1,642.53 sq mi) and is divided into eight districts.

- Huancabamba
- Canchaque
- El Carmen de la Frontera
- Huarmaca
- Lalaquiz
- San Miguel de El Faique
- Sondor
- Sondorillo

== Population ==
The province has an approximate population of 125,000 residents.

== Capital ==
The capital of the province is the city of Huancabamba.

This province is famous by Waringa Lake (Laguna de Huaringas).

== See also ==
- Piura Region
- Peru
