= Martha Calderón Ríos =

Peruvian biologist

Martha Steffany Calderón Ríos
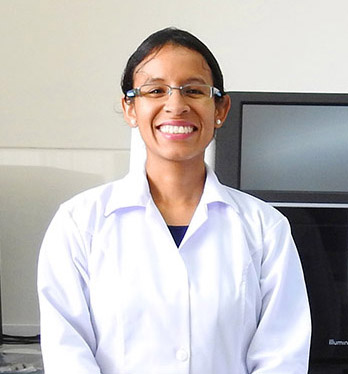
- Education: National University of San Marcos (bachelor's degree); Chungnam National University (master's and doctorate)
- Awards: L'Oréal-UNESCO For Women in Science Award (2019)
- Scientific career
- Workplaces: National University Toribio Rodríguez de Mendoza

Martha Steffany Calderón Ríos (born 1988) is a Peruvian biologist recognized for her research in the field of genetics and molecular biology aimed at the sustainable use of natural resources. In 2019, she carried out an expedition in Antarctica that led to the discovery of the first bleached crustose coralline algae, an important precedent for the study of environmental impact on the Antarctic continent.

== Biography ==
=== Early years and education ===
Martha Calderón Ríos was born in Lima. She developed an interest in science from an early age. At the age of fifteen, inspired by a documentary on the Machu Picchu Base in Antarctica, she resolved to pursue a career in biology, driven by the aspiration of one day visiting the continent. She graduated as a biologist with a mention in hydrobiology and fisheries at the National University of San Marcos and later completed her postgraduate studies at the Chungnam National University in Daejeon, South Korea.

== Career ==
Currently, She is registered in the Peruvian National Registry of Researchers (RENACYT), classified at Level I. Her research covers the study of species with agricultural and biotechnological potential. In the field of microbiology, the identification of a new fungal species, Beauveria peruviensis, represents a significant global milestone. This discovery contributes to the biological control of the coffee berry borer (Hypothenemus hampei), one of the most destructive pests affecting coffee production worldwide.

In the field of botany, her research on different species of high-altitude papaya (Caricaceae, Vasconcellea) has led to the identification of five previously undocumented species with notable agroeconomic potential, thereby contributing to the advancement of their cultivation in local agricultural systems.

Likewise, her focus on the production chain through the study of the genetic structure of cacao (Theobroma cacao L.) has provided useful information to improve its conservation and carry out a more efficient cultivation of the various native varieties. Also, her research on coffee fermentation has revealed how certain bacteria can improve its flavor and aroma, generating new opportunities to produce high-quality beans in the region.

In 2019, she participated in a scientific expedition to Antarctica, supported by the Public Science program of the Ministry of Science, Technology, Knowledge and Innovation of the Government of Chile. During the expedition, she conducted significant research on algal identification, which was later documented in the publication Antarctica: Stories of Explorers in the Heart of the Planet. Her work contributed to the discovery of the first recorded instance of bleached crustose coralline algae in Antarctica, a microorganism regarded as a potential bioindicator for assessing the environmental health of polar ecosystems.

In addition to her scientific work, in 2022, the National Council for Science, Technology and Technological Innovation of Peru (CONCYTEC) appointed her as a member of the Pro Women in Science, Technology and Innovation (STI) Committee; which aims to reduce the gender gap by fostering an equitable and inclusive environment that ensures women have equal opportunities to engage in scientific research and development. In line with the committee's objectives, Calderón has formed a commission within the National University Toribio Rodríguez de Mendoza which seeks to promote the visibility of women in science through talks and fairs.

== Investigation areas ==
Calderón's research focuses on the application of molecular techniques, such as gene sequencing and DNA analysis, to identify species, assess their genetic diversity, and develop strategies for the conservation and sustainable management of natural resources.

== Awards and recognitions ==
In 2019, she received a L'Oréal-UNESCO For Women in Science Award in recognition of her outstanding research on the development of starter cultures applying metagenomic sequencing to identify microorganisms present in the spontaneous fermentation of high-quality coffees in the Amazon, marking an important milestone in the beginning of a more industrialized and controlled production process through the use of defined microbial strains.
