= San Pablo University =

San Pablo University or University of San Pablo may refer to:

- Universidad CEU San Pablo, private Catholic university in Madrid, Spain
- Universidad Católica de San Pablo, private university in Arequipa, Peru
- Bolivian Catholic University San Pablo, Catholic university in La Paz, Bolivia
