= Piura =

City in Peru

Piura San Miguel de Piura
- City
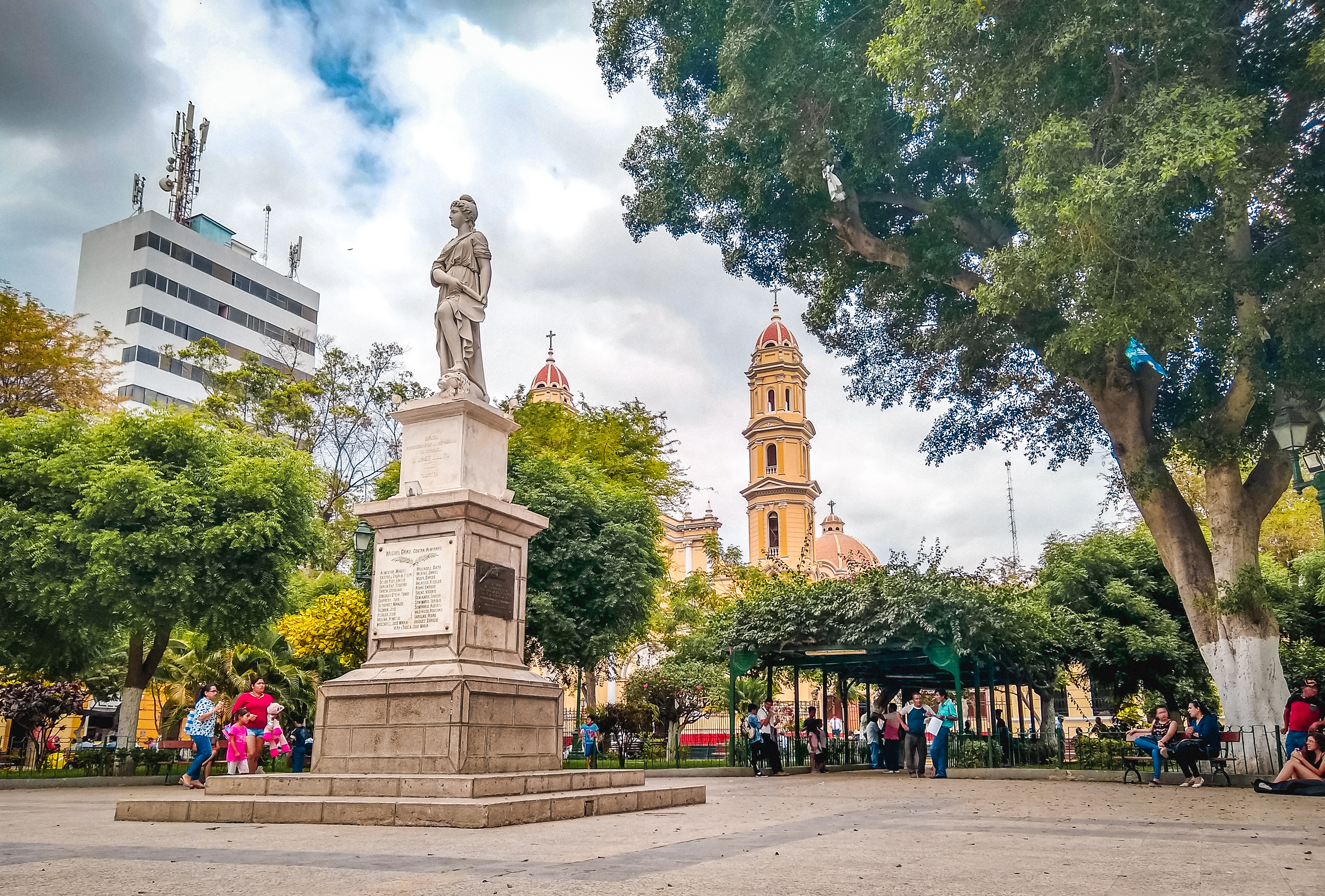
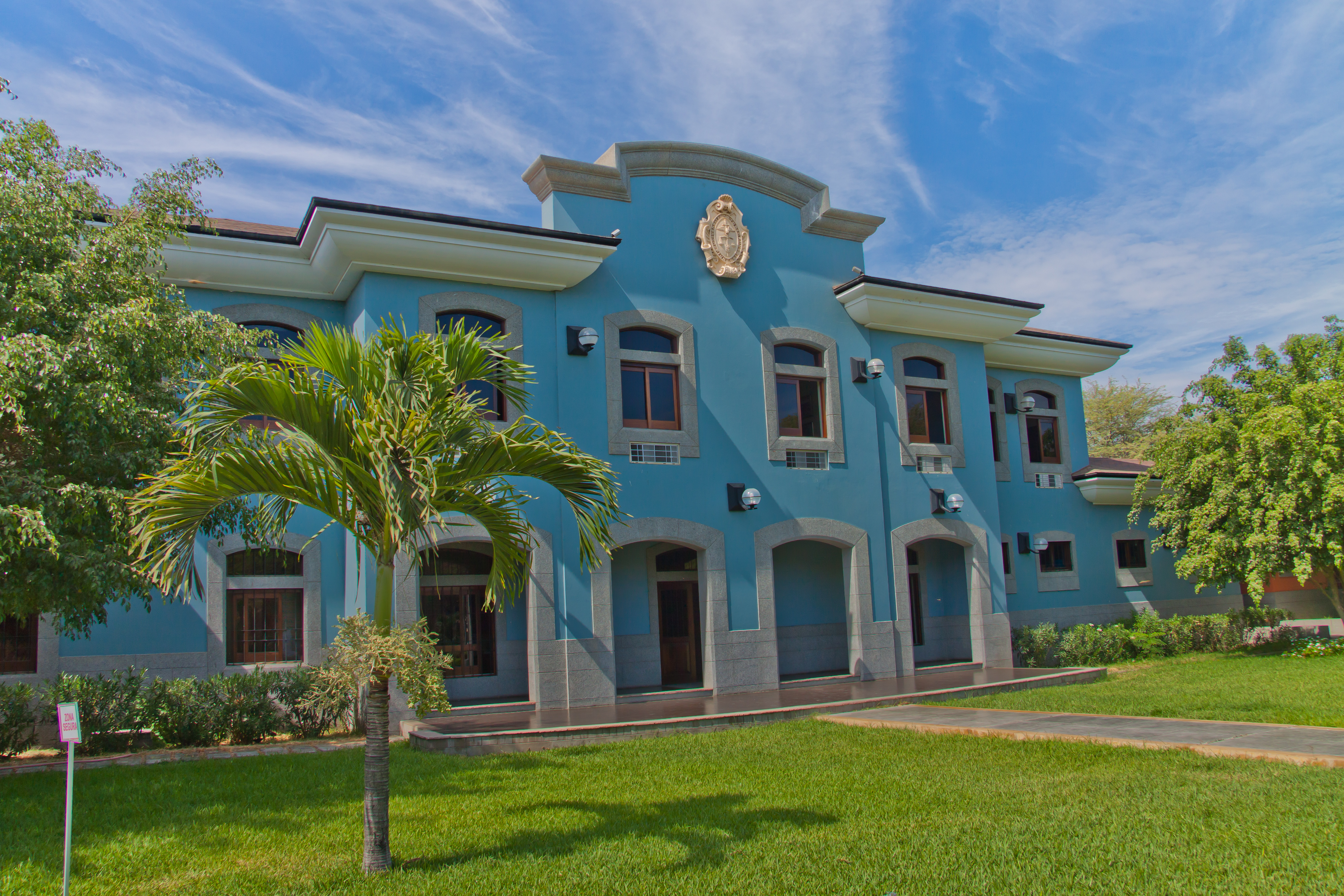
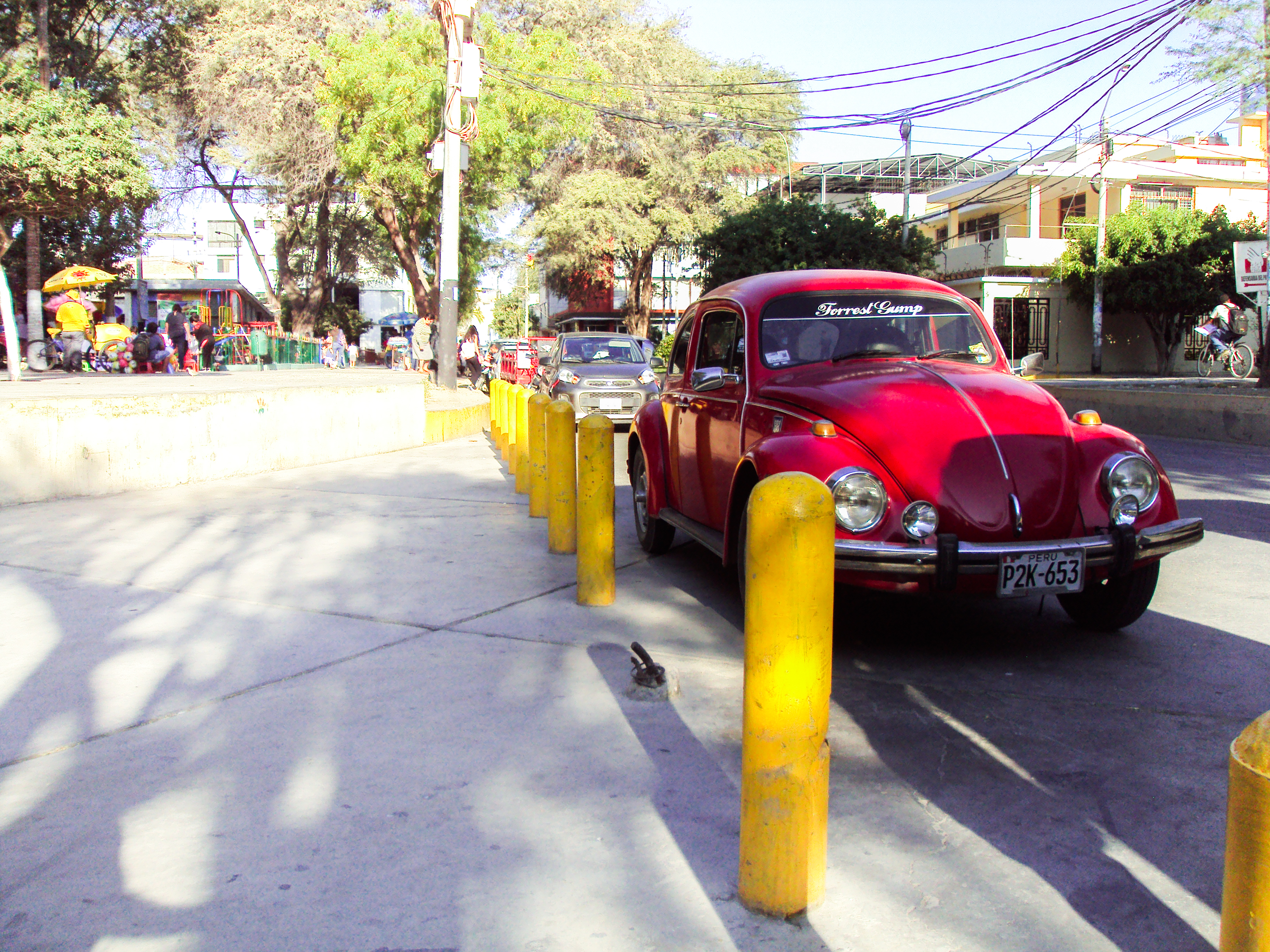
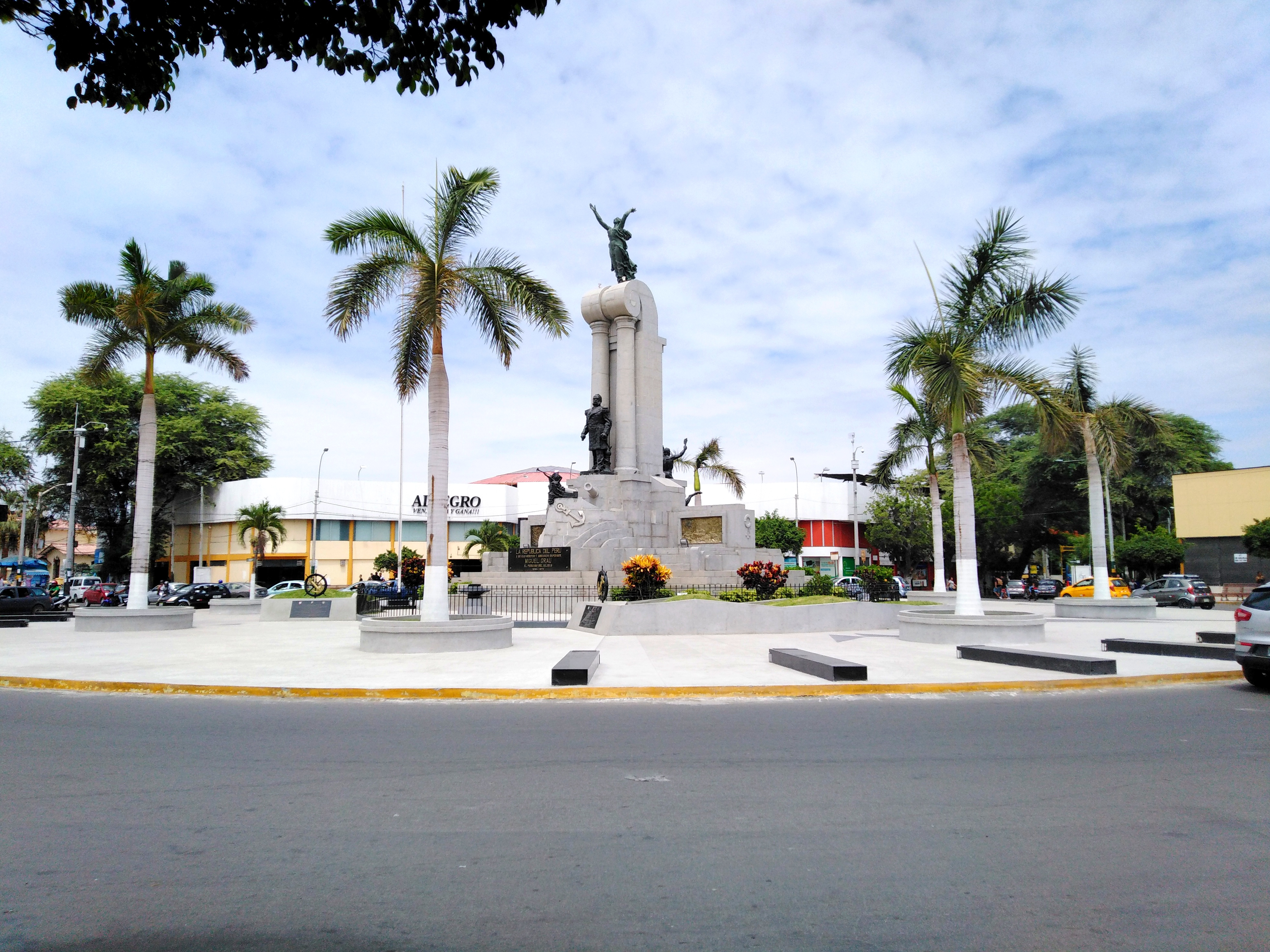
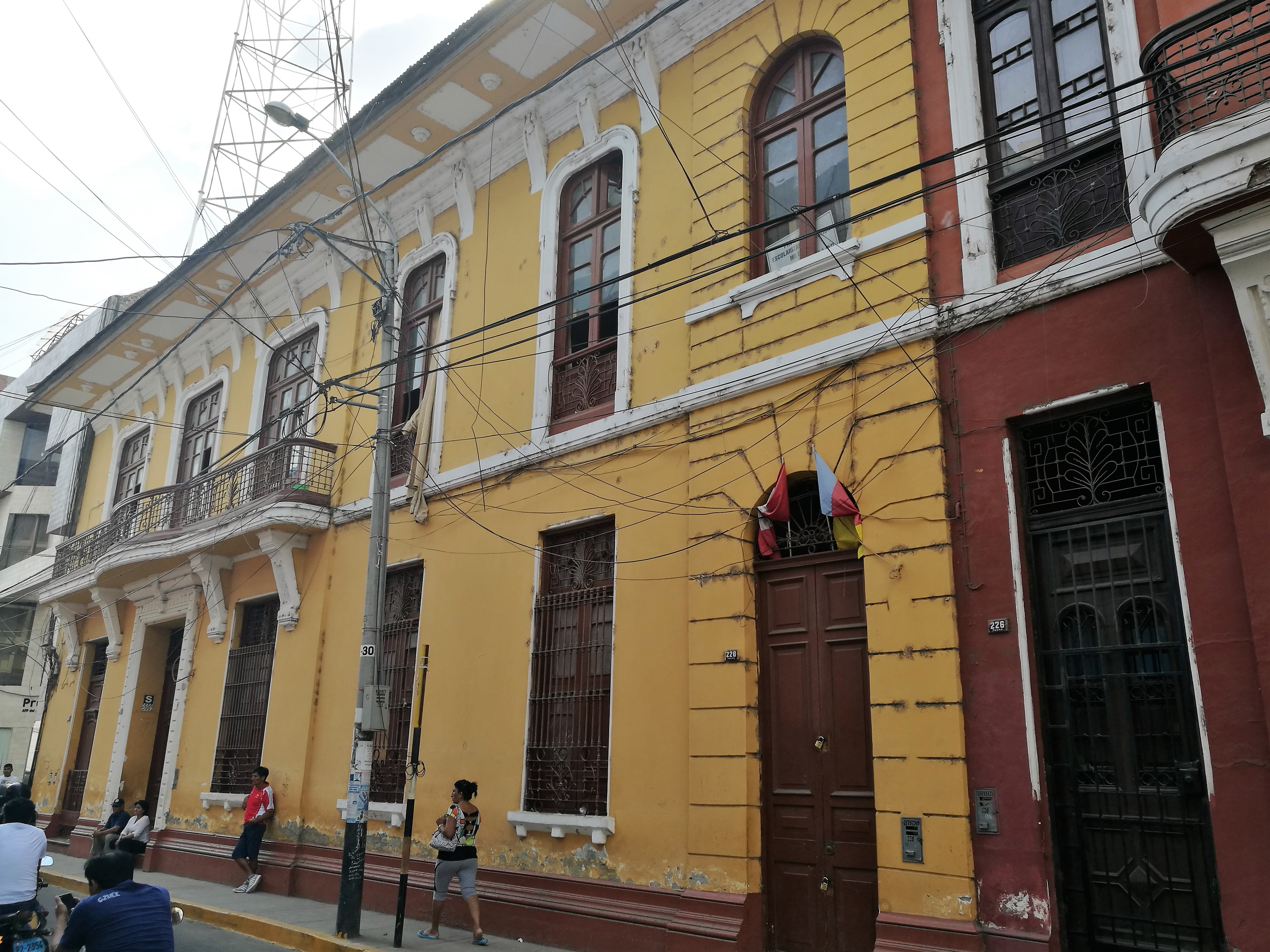
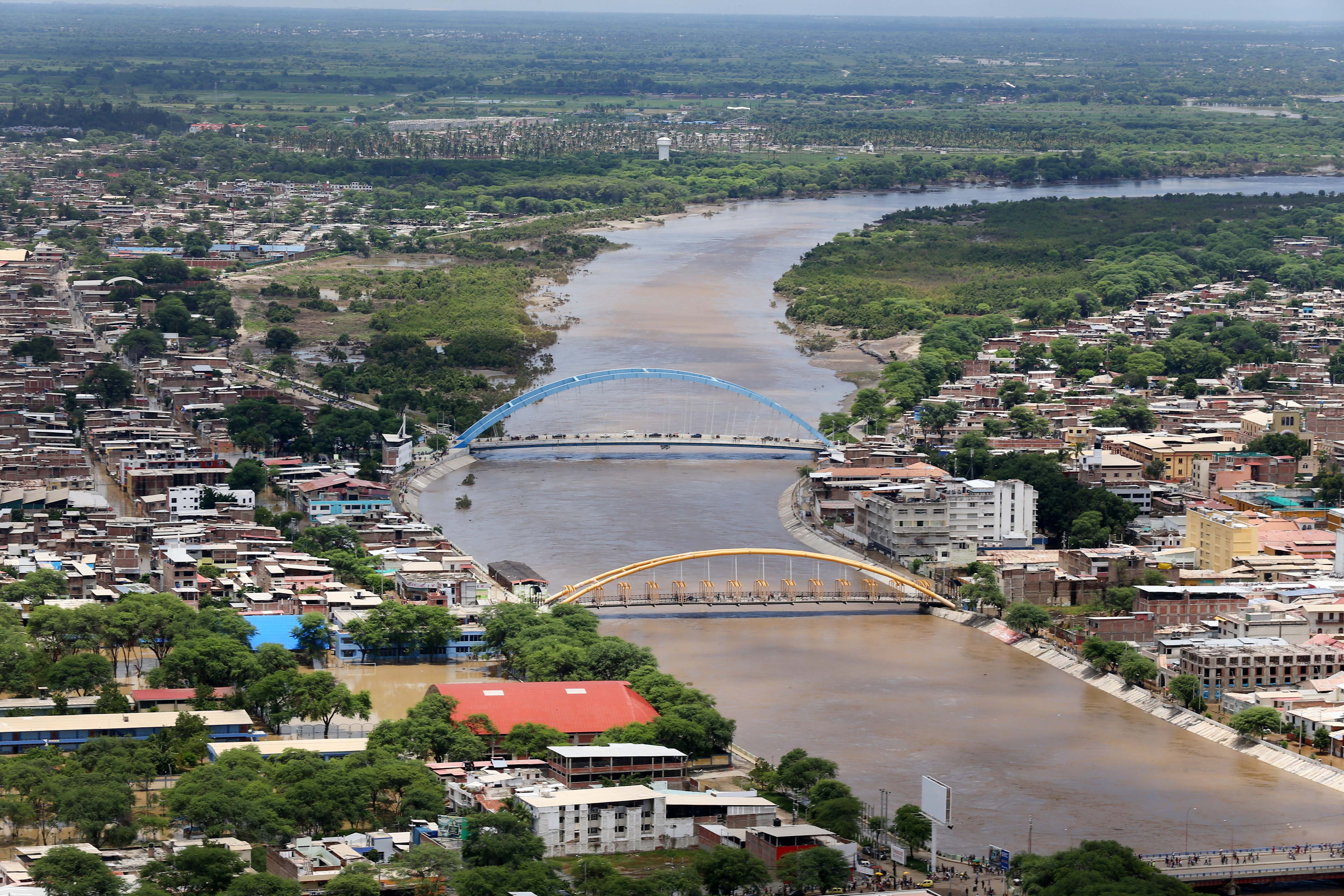
- Plaza de Armas and Piura Cathedral University of Piura Avenida Grau Miguel Grau Roundabout A street for Hotel Tacna Piura River and Barrio Norte area's panorama

- Flag Seal
- Nicknames: La Primera Ciudad (The First City); La Ciudad del Eterno Calor (The City of The Eternal Heat)
- Interactive map of Piura
- Location within Peru Location within South America Location within Earth
- Coordinates: 5°12′S 80°38′W
- Country: Peru
- Region: Piura
- Province: Piura
- Founded: 1532
- Founder: Francisco Pizarro

Government
  - Alcalde: Gabriel Madrid (2023-2026)

Area
  - Total: 621.2 km^{2} (239.8 sq mi)
- Elevation: 55 m (180 ft)

Population (2020)
  - Total: 630,244
  - Estimate (2020): 630,000
  - Rank: 7th
  - Density: 647/km^{2} (1,675/sq mi)
- Demonym: Piurano
- Time zone: UTC/GMT-5
- Area code: 73
- Website: munipiura.gob.pe

Piura is a city in northwestern Peru, located north of the Sechura Desert along the Piura River. It is the capital of the Piura Region and the Piura Province. Its population was 484,475 as of 2017 and it is the 7th most populous city in Peru. The city is located in the central eastern part of the Piura Region, 981 kilometers from the country's capital, Lima and is near to the border with Ecuador.

It was here that Spanish Conqueror Francisco Pizarro founded the third Spanish city in South America and first in Peru, under the name of San Miguel de la Nueva Castilla (en: Saint Michael of New Castile) in the Tallán settlement of Tangarará on July or August of 1532. Piura declared its independence from Spain on 4 January 1821, a few months before Peru gained its independence on 28 July 1821. It is the commercial and administrative center of the Department of Piura.

== Symbols ==
=== Coat of arms ===
The coat of arms of Piura was created by the Spanish Crown on December 7, 1537, through the Royal Decree signed in Valladolid by Emperor Charles V. It is used to identify both the city of Piura, as well as the district and province of the same name.

=== Anthem ===
The Piura anthem was composed in 1932 by Enrique del Carmen Ramos Briceño, at the request of the Colegio Nuestra Señora de Lourdes. Professor San Carlos was in charge of composing the music.

== Etymology and toponymy ==
The name Piura, probably of indigenous origin, remains uncertain and requires proper linguistic reconstruction. Enrique del Carmen Ramos Briceño suggested that it derives from the Quechua word Pirhua, meaning "supply deposit" or "granary". However, according to linguist Carlos Arrizabalaga, Quechua more commonly uses the terms colca, collcca, or qullqa. Based on this, Ramos Briceño argued that Piura may have been a provisioning point or pirhua along the Qhapaq Ñan of the Incas.

Arrizabalaga, together with researchers Martos and Mendoza, questioned this interpretation. He noted that the traditional local practice in the region was to store grains in large clay jars (tinajas) buried beneath the salty sands of the dunes. The earliest mention of Piura appears in 1535, when Francisco de Jerez referred to the valley of the Piura River, not to a settlement. Cristóbal de Mena later mentioned a town by that name, though not the present city. In 1553, Pedro Cieza de León again used the name Piura in reference to the river valley. The first known mention of San Miguel de Piura comes from a letter dated 1554, while in 1570 Juan de Salinas y Loyola referred to the city in the valley of the same name, remarking that the word had no known meaning. Given this chronology, the term Piura likely originated from the name of the Piura River or its valley and became associated with the settlement after its refoundation at Piura "La Vieja" following the abandonment of San Miguel de Tangarará.

Mendoza, also cited by Arrizabalaga, along with Martos, emphasized that the predominant ethnic substratum in the lower and middle Piura region was Tallán, noting that Chimú control was primarily administrative and Inca rule lasted barely fifty years. They argue that the word Piura is instead connected to the Sechura-Catacao languages, which included: Sec or Sechura and the subgroup of the Tallan language(s) such as Colán, and Catacaos. The scholars suggest that the toponymic suffix /-ura/ may be linked to these languages and associated with water, since similar endings recur in coastal and riverine place names such as Sechura, Nunura, Casura, Pisura, Lalura, Mancura, Congora, and Pillacura.

== History ==
=== Pre-Columbian era ===
Like most of northern Peru, the territory of Piura has been inhabited by their autochthonous group of natives called tallanes and yungas. These groups lived without an organization or single leader to rule until the Muchik culture eventually took control, and the mixture of these evolved into the Vicús culture. The Chimor, Moche and Wari Empire used to occupy the area surrounding the city. Centuries later, Piura came under the rule of Tupac Inca Yupanqui of the Inca Empire for at least 40 years before the Spanish arrived.

=== Colonial era ===
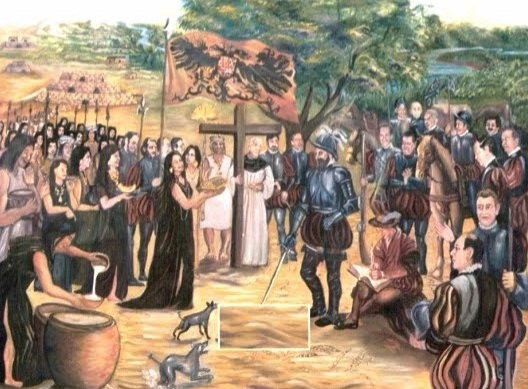
Painting of the founding of San Miguel de Tangarará

Francisco Pizarro came to the area and established it as the third Spanish city in South America, and Spain's first city in Peru, known as San Miguel de Tangarará. He originally went all the way to what is now Tumbes but decided it was not a suitable base for his operations. With the arrival of the Spanish in 1532, the current mestizo and creole cultures of Piura were born. This mestizo culture includes influences from Spanish Extremadura and Andalucia; African influence, owing to the arrival of slaves from Madagascar (Malgache slaves); Chinese coolies who migrated from Canton to work the rice fields and replace the slaves; and also Roma Gypsies who came as pirates looking for pearls, or incognito as Spanish horsemen. Piura celebrates its founding every 15 of August.

Two years after its founding, the city's inhabitants migrated to their second settlement near the Monte de los Padres estate in the Alto Piura valley, on the right bank. The Technical University of Madrid, in conjunction with the University of Piura, is conducting studies there as part of the Scientific Cooperation Program with Latin America. Chroniclers report that it housed 23 encomenderos, a number comparable to Trujillo and slightly fewer than Lima, and its buildings have high stone foundations, which has allowed for the reconstruction of the city's layout. They remained for more than forty years in this place, which was known to the natives as Pirhua or Piura, meaning "granary" or "place where grains are stored . " This was the city that Pedro Cieza de León visited and described in his work " Chronicle of Peru " in 1547, and the Adelantado Don Juan Salinas de Loyola did the same in 1571, estimating that there were more than 100 houses on lots 180 feet long and wide.

Around 1578, most of the inhabitants of Piura moved to the third settlement, the port of San Francisco de Buena Esperanza de Paita, frustrated by the harsh climate. However, with the raid by the English pirate Thomas Cavendish (from January to May 1587), who seized a large amount of loot (25 pounds of silver and 5,500 pounds of precious metals) and ruined the city, the inhabitants relocated to their fourth and final settlement at the head of the Catacaos Valley, or Lower Piura, next to the pre-Columbian Tacalá Dam, reinforced with lime and stone by Viceroy Francisco de Toledo. Since then, the city has managed to stay in this place known as the seat of Chilcal, as they found a healthy climate, the element that has always characterized it, the Piura River that provided abundant seasonal water, as well as excellent farmland, wide plains covered with carob forests that facilitated livestock and firewood.

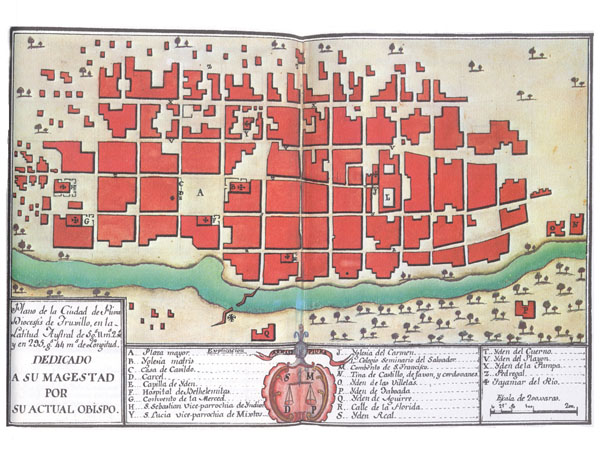
18th century city plan

Piura during the Viceroyalty, became a gateway and obligatory stop on the route from Spain to Lima, as at that time the port of Paita offered the best advantages for ships arriving from the metropolis. Each viceroy entered Peru by sea through Paita, then traveled to Piura, continuing his journey overland to the capital. The city was dotted with the mansions of landowners and ranchers, as well as the homes of officials and those engaged in related activities and services. The renowned cordovan leather, all kinds of leather and soaps were produced in tanneries and in the so-called vats located in the northern part of the city, its first industrial zone. These items formed part of the flow of exports and commercial exchange from the region to the interior of the country and to Guayaquil, Loja and Cuenca. These were joined by dried meat and tallow from the Tangarará ranch, salted shark and salt from Colán and Sechura, respectively, potatoes, corn and wheat from Huancabamba, potatoes and sugarcane by-products from Ayabaca, and cotton from Catacaos.

=== Independence ===
In 1820, with the incursions of Admirals Guillermo Brown and Cochrane of the liberating expedition of José de San Martín, the Piuran population enthusiastically joined the liberating cause, and on January 4, 1821, the independence of Piura was proclaimed in the atrium of the temple of San Francisco. The proclamation was an feat led by the heroes José de Lama, Tomás Cortés, Baltazar Taboada, Tomás Diéguez, the Seminario brothers and others. Likewise, the Piura division of 1,000 men contributed victoriously to the independence of Quito, taking part in the Battle of Pichincha, on May 24, 1822.

=== Republican era ===
On January 30, 1837, the city was elevated to the category of Coastal Province. During the early years of the republic, the people of Piura took sides with the various political movements of the time, becoming the scene of fierce struggles for one leader or another.

In 1861, the Department of Piura was created and Piura became the departments capital. The department consisted of three other provinces at the time, Piura, Paita and Ayabaca.

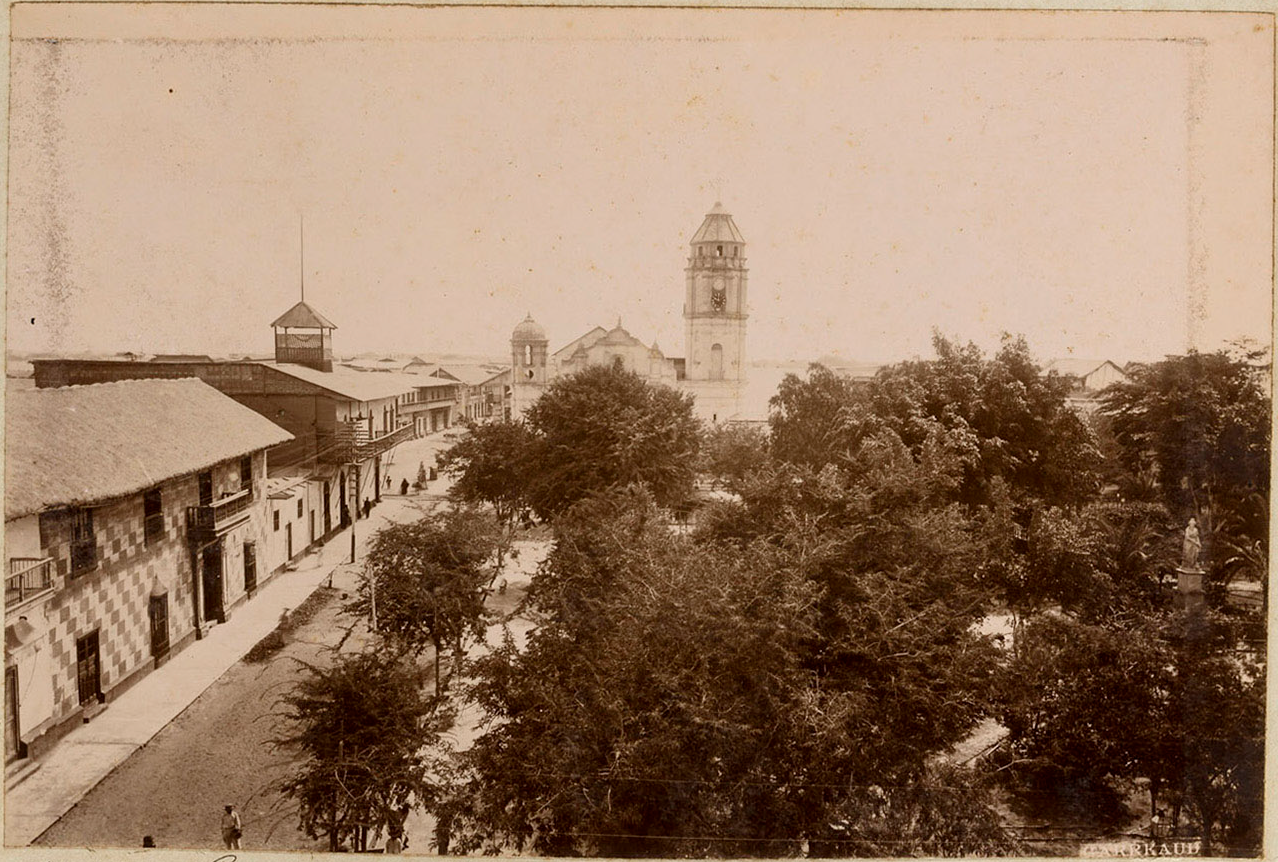
Plaza de Armas of Piura in 1900

In the 1860s, the city of Piura became more dynamic with the cultivation of Pima cotton, brought by Don Emilio Hilbck from the state of Arizona in the United States, which promoted the industrialization and development of the city and the region, and strong immigration. of English, German and Spanish, in that order, and to a lesser extent Italians and Chinese, who brought their customs and also their knowledge of commerce and industry. Many Americans also arrived. They quickly incorporated themselves into the social fabric, forming families with local ladies and inevitably creating new tastes and habits. Even Piura's cuisine was enriched. In agriculture, the use of the steam pump and specialized machinery was introduced, allowing more cropland to be irrigated, expanding the network of canals since the success of Piuran cotton in the international market was a great stimulus for agriculture. New industries appeared such as deep-sea fishing by whaling fleets, mass production and export trade of toquilla straw hats from Catacaos and annexes.

Peruvian war hero of the War of the Pacific against Chile, Miguel Grau Seminario was born in Piura on July 27, 1834. He became a hero during the naval Battle of Angamos. According to historians and the Peruvian state, since 2011, they have given the official birthplace of Grau not to Piura but to the port of Paita. Miguel Grau is the most renowned and iconic Peruvian naval officer, being known as el Caballero de los Mares (Spanish for "Gentleman of the Seas").

In the 1980s, Piura and the department again experienced an ascending and thriving commercial, industrial and socioeconomic development, despite having been devastated in the 1983 disaster, as a consequence of the El Niño phenomenon, manifested in torrential rains for six months. that affected its industry, commerce and its urban infrastructure. The El Niño phenomenon that occurred from late 1997 to mid-1998 found the city better prepared, although two of its bridges fell and were subsequently replaced. When it seemed that it was going to be a dry season, in February 2017 it began to rain heavily in what later became known as the coastal Niño phenomenon, and in the early hours of March 27, the river overflowed over the center and northern areas. of the city, causing unforeseen damage, affecting health networks and communication routes.

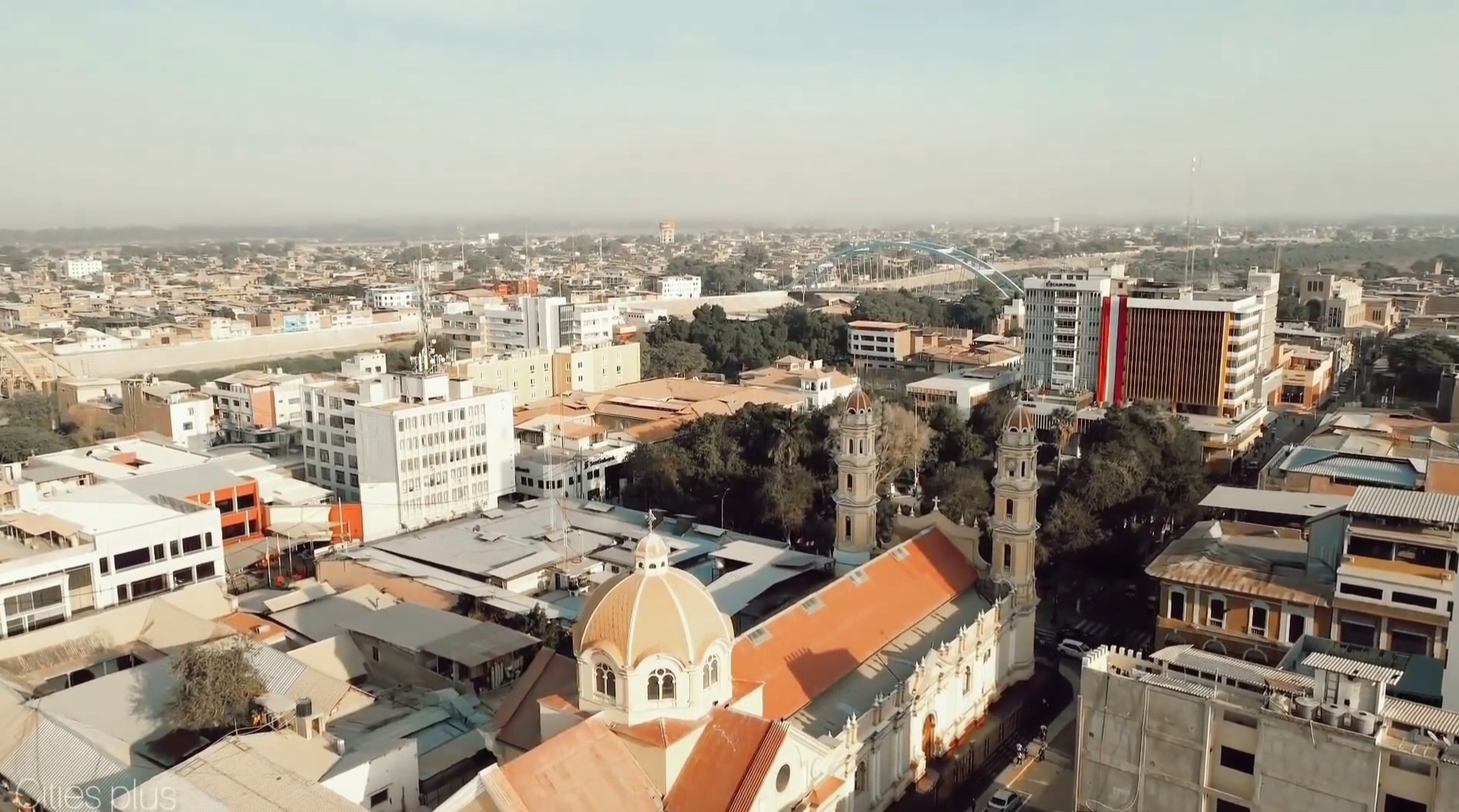
Aereal view of Piura

Piura is experiencing strong development of its commercial sector with the installation of large shopping centers and department stores in no less than five points of the city considered strategic by investors. Furthermore, in recent years the city has expanded considerably with the creation of new developments and human settlements. Likewise, its industrial sector was also developed with the inauguration of the "Piura Futura" industrial estate, northwest of Piura.

Nowadays, Piura is known as the Ciudad del eterno calor, 'the city of eternal heat', because it is hot all year round.

== Geography ==
=== Location ===
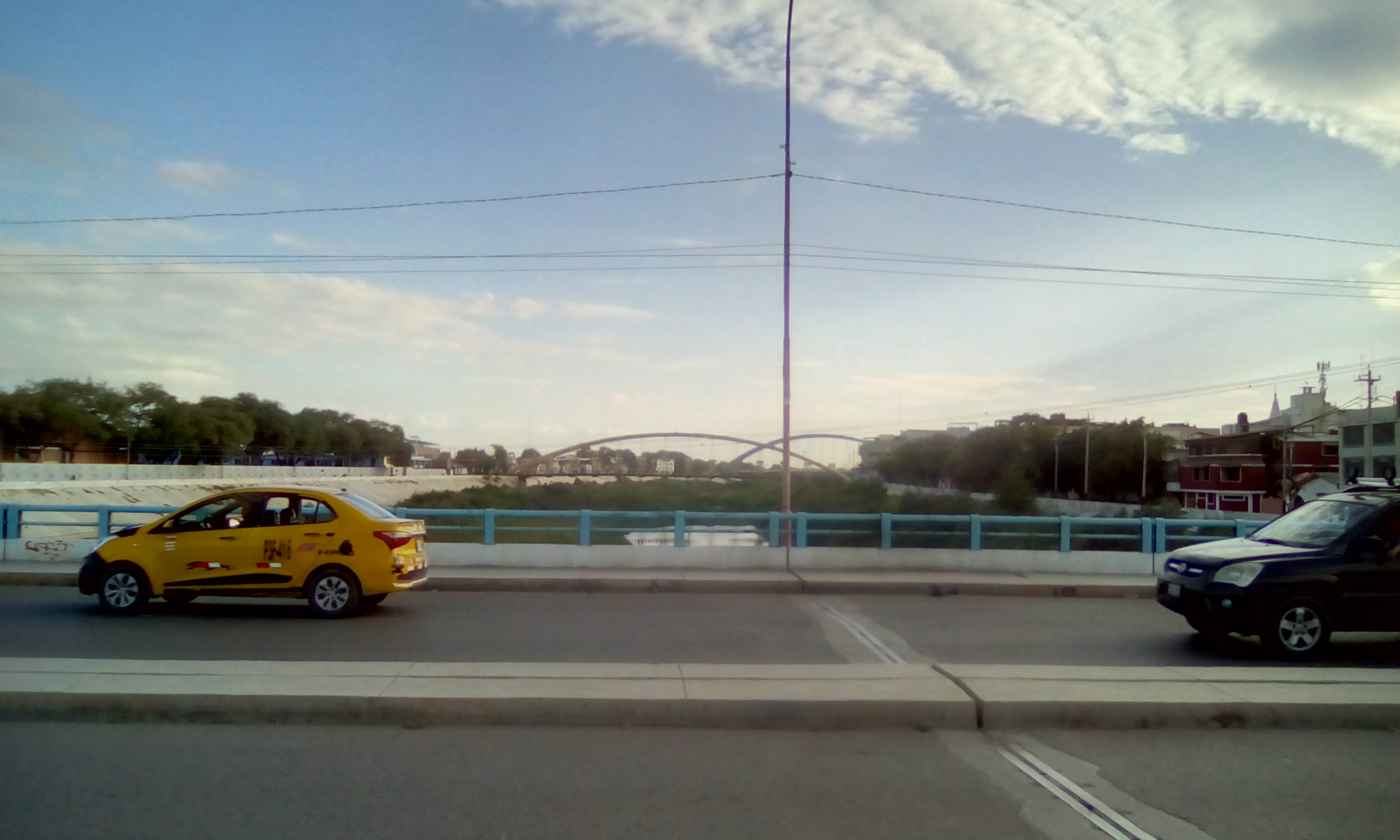
Puente Sánchez Cerro

Piura is located in the central-eastern part of the Department of Piura, in the valley of the Piura River, north of the Sechura Desert. It is located at a medium-low altitude and at a distance of 858 km north of Lima. Its proximity to the border with Ecuador and its location in a transit zone between the coast and the mountains give it a strategic geographical position. Piura is the main nucleus of the urban agglomeration known as the Piura metropolitan area.

=== Climate ===
The Piura Department has a desert and semi-desert climate on the coast and the western slopes of the Andes, whereas on the eastern slopes the climate is subtropical. Precipitation is sparse except during El Niño events, when rainfall is abundant and water flows through normally dry watercourses, causing flooding and large-scale land movements.

Climate data for Piura (FAP Captain Guillermo Concha Iberico International Airport) (1991–2020 normals, extremes 1932–present)
Month	Jan	Feb	Mar	Apr	May	Jun	Jul	Aug	Sep	Oct	Nov	Dec	Year
Record high °C (°F)	37.9 (100.2)	38.4 (101.1)	38.2 (100.8)	39.9 (103.8)	36.1 (97.0)	35.0 (95.0)	33.5 (92.3)	33.0 (91.4)	34.1 (93.4)	34.0 (93.2)	37.0 (98.6)	36.6 (97.9)	39.9 (103.8)
Mean daily maximum °C (°F)	33.8 (92.8)	34.6 (94.3)	34.5 (94.1)	33.2 (91.8)	31.2 (88.2)	29.2 (84.6)	28.1 (82.6)	28.3 (82.9)	29.1 (84.4)	29.7 (85.5)	30.5 (86.9)	32.1 (89.8)	31.2 (88.2)
Daily mean °C (°F)	28.0 (82.4)	28.9 (84.0)	28.8 (83.8)	27.4 (81.3)	25.5 (77.9)	23.9 (75.0)	22.9 (73.2)	22.8 (73.0)	23.2 (73.8)	23.6 (74.5)	24.3 (75.7)	26.1 (79.0)	25.5 (77.8)
Mean daily minimum °C (°F)	22.1 (71.8)	23.3 (73.9)	23.1 (73.6)	21.5 (70.7)	19.9 (67.8)	18.5 (65.3)	17.6 (63.7)	17.2 (63.0)	17.2 (63.0)	17.4 (63.3)	18.2 (64.8)	20.0 (68.0)	19.7 (67.4)
Record low °C (°F)	10.0 (50.0)	14.3 (57.7)	16.0 (60.8)	12.2 (54.0)	10.0 (50.0)	10.0 (50.0)	10.0 (50.0)	10.0 (50.0)	10.5 (50.9)	8.4 (47.1)	11.1 (52.0)	9.8 (49.6)	8.4 (47.1)
Average precipitation mm (inches)	16.9 (0.67)	19.0 (0.75)	32.4 (1.28)	24.4 (0.96)	15.1 (0.59)	5.0 (0.20)	0.5 (0.02)	0.0 (0.0)	0.0 (0.0)	1.1 (0.04)	0.8 (0.03)	1.2 (0.05)	116.4 (4.58)
Average precipitation days (≥ 1.0 mm)	1.8	2.3	3.7	2.6	0.4	0.5	0.0	0.0	0.1	0.2	0.4	0.7	12.8
Average relative humidity (%)	51	55	51	55	59	66	66	65	64	60	58	56	59
Source 1: NOAA, Meteo Climat
Source 2: Deutscher Wetterdienst (precipitation days 1970–2003 and humidity 1955–1969)

=== Hydrography ===
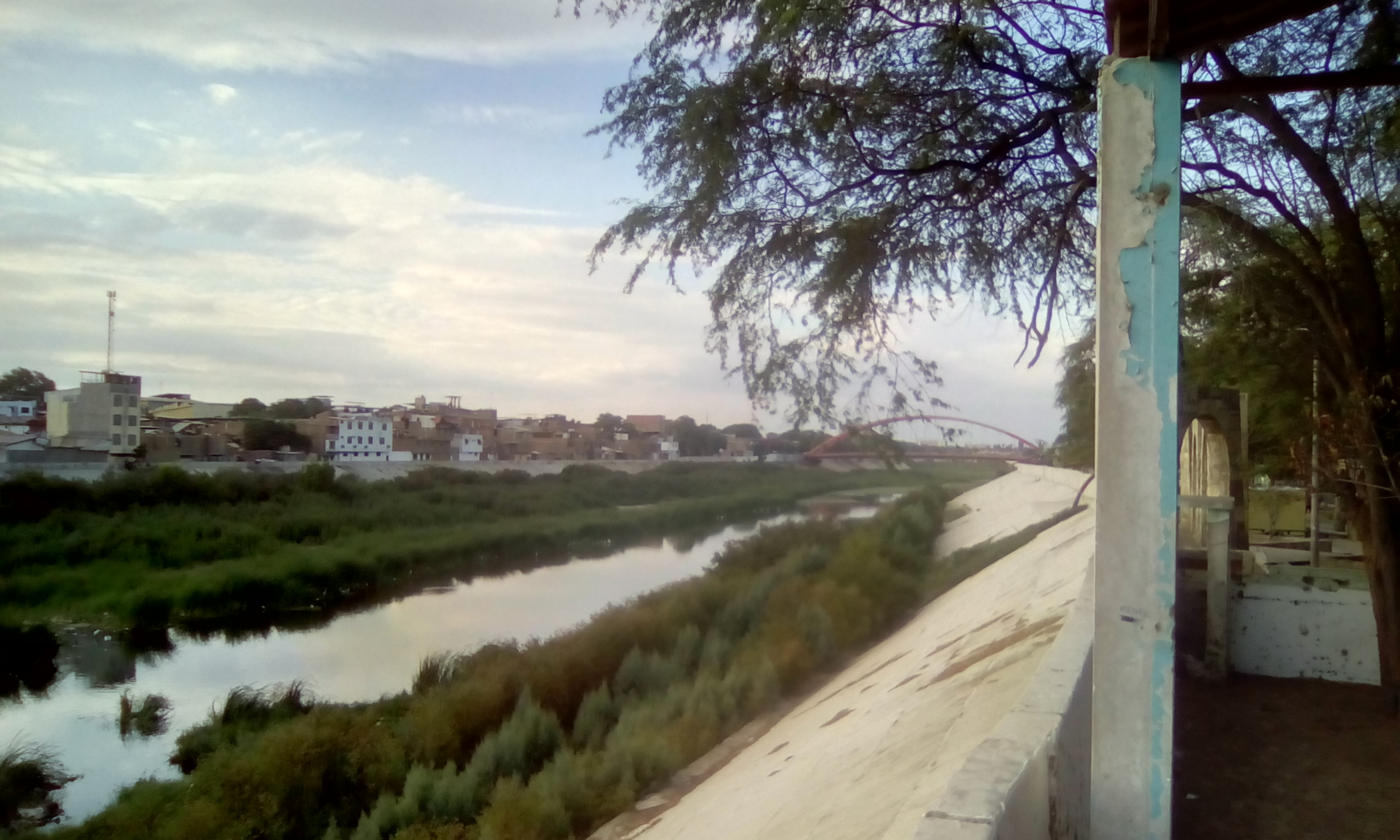
Piura River

The hydrography of Piura Department is determined mainly by the amount of rainfall originating in the Pacific Ocean. This rainfall is itself determined by the meeting of two ocean currents on the southern coast of the department, around the bay of Sechura: the cold Humboldt current at 13–19 °C (55–66 °F), and the warm El Niño at 21–27 °C (70–81 °F). These conditions lead to fluctuations in offshore sea temperatures, which are 18–23 °C (64–73 °F) in winter and spring, and 23–27 °C (73–81 °F) in summer and sometimes in autumn.

The mean annual humidity is 66%. The mean atmospheric pressure is 1008.5 hPa, while winds are mainly from the north at an average speed of 3 m/s (9.8 ft/s). Annual rainfall varies between 10 and 200 mm (0.39–7.87 in) at altitudes of 100–500 metres (330–1,640 ft); between 200 and 800 mm (7.9–31.5 in) at altitudes of 500–1,500 metres (1,600–4,900 ft); and averages 1,550 mm (61 in) at altitudes above 1,500 metres (4,900 ft).

Most of the region is arid, with rainfall concentrated in the high Andean areas, while on the wide plains the main water sources are seasonal rivers flowing from the north: the Chira and the Piura. The southern half of the plain consists of the Sechura Desert, which supports herbaceous vegetation.

The main rivers are the Piura, the Huancabamba and the Chira. The reservoir of Poechos has been created within the course of the Chira. It has a capacity of 1,000,000,000 cubic metres (1.0×10^{12} L; 2.6×10^{11} US gal) and irrigates large portions of the coastal region. The river Quiroz, a tributary of the Piura, supplies the huge artificial lake of San Lorenzo. On the Huancabamba, in the mountains, there is a hydroelectric power station supplying energy to the region.

== Demographics ==
Piura is the 7th most populous city in Peru, after Lima, Arequipa, Trujillo, Chiclayo, Huancayo and Iquitos. The city has an estimated population of 630,244 according to the census carried out by the Instituto Nacional de Estadística e Informática in 2020.

The Metropolitan area of Piura is made up of the urban centers of the districts of Piura, Veintisirse de Octubre, Castilla and Catacaos, with the city of Piura being the main urban nucleus, in accordance with the "Urban Development Plan of the districts of Piura, Twenty-sixth of October, Castilla and Catacaos in 2032".

== Economy ==
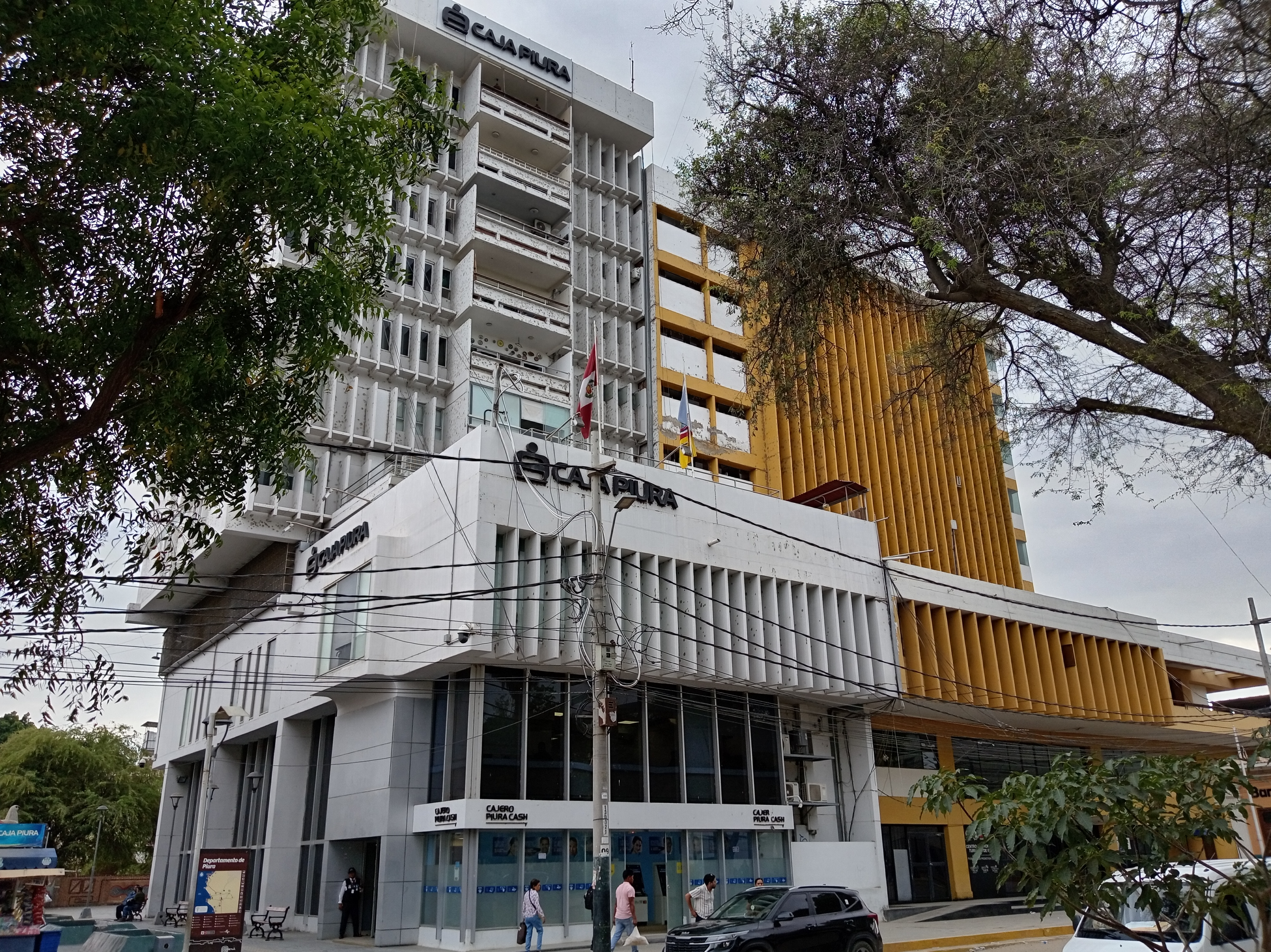
Caja Piura and Municipality building

Piura is a center of a rich agricultural, fishing, mining, and oil-producing region. It has become a development hub over the last 10 years thanks to significant private investment. The relationship between the capital, San Miguel de Piura, and its surrounding area is dynamic in all directions, as it is equidistant from the towns of Sullana, Paita, Sechura, Chulucanas, and Tambo Grande, averaging 50km. Every day, a steady flow of people and goods is evident in the buses and all types of motor vehicles that connect these areas at all hours via perfectly paved roads. The commercial boom of recent years demonstrates that Piura has great consumer power, that the population, whatever the socioeconomic level, has purchasing power, which is reflected in the large number of cards that are used daily to make purchases or cash withdrawals in any commercial establishment, which is a great attraction for national and foreign private investment.

=== Tourism ===
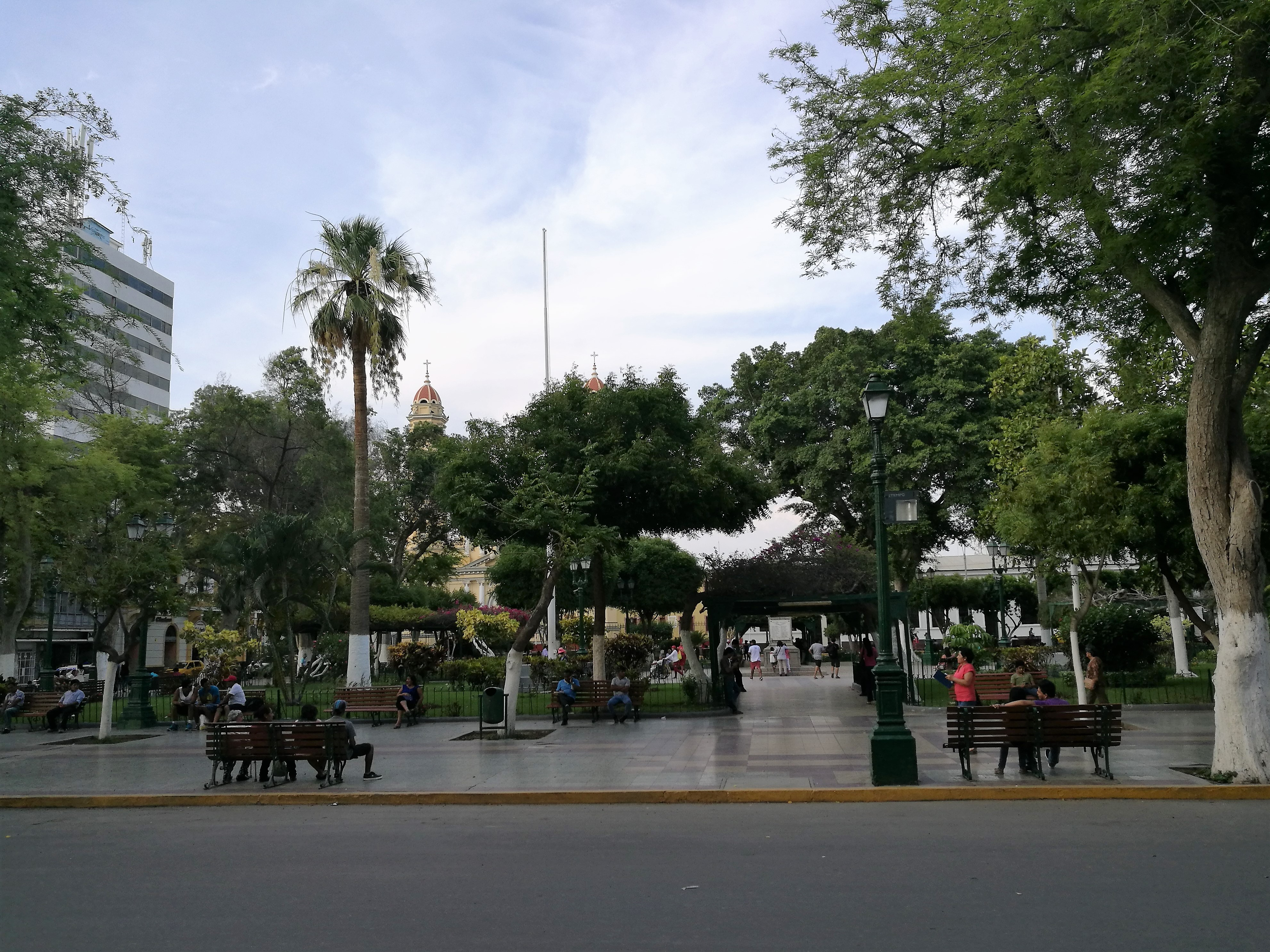
Plaza de Armas

Piura is known as "the city of eternal heat", its Plaza de Armas is one of the oldest and most beautiful in the country, with a square Spanish cut. The Piura Cathedral was built in the viceregal era and preserves its altarpieces and is surrounded by tamarind, ficus, crotos, cucardas, poncianas and papelillos. It is crisscrossed by wide avenues that make it functional. Apart from the market complex, it has several shopping centers, the best known are the Open Plaza, Plaza del Sol, Real Plaza and Plaza de la Luna, as well as modern urbanizations, condominiums in exclusive areas and recreational fields such as country restaurants, soccer fields, tennis, etc.

Piura is one of the top tourist destinations in Peru. One of the best-known tourist attractions in Piura is La Esmeralda beach, known as Colan beach for it is located near the town of Colan. It is a very long beach with warm waters. Local people like to go there during holidays. The airport of the city of Piura, located in the district of Castilla, is the fourth most important destination in the country due to the influx of flights and passengers. Beaches such as Playa Cangrejos, Mancora Beach and Cabo Blanco. Cabo Blanco was made famous by visitor Ernest Hemingway in 1956, where he supervised the filming of The Old Man and the Sea.

== Culture and folklore ==
=== Art ===
Piura has an intense cultural and artistic life. It has several museums of religious art, including the Church of Carmen, of pre-Columbian ceramics, particularly of the Vicús civilization, as well as galleries of paintings of its illustrious characters such as Ignacio Merino, Luis Montero Cáceres, Felipe Cossío del Pomar, Arcadio Boyer Ramírez, and contemporary painters such as Francisco Mauricio, Russbelt Guerra, Julio Cálle, José Zeta, Marcial Farfan, among others. The Ignacio Merino Muñoz Regional School of Fine Arts, the José María Valle Riestra Regional School of Music and the Children's Symphony Orchestra of Piura OSIP (Camerata Académica de Piura) are hotbeds of a plethora of young artists. The Municipal Symphony Orchestra is supported by the Provincial Council of Piura, businessmen and the Piura public that attends each of its presentations. Institutions such as the Regional Association of Plastic Artists of Piura ARAP and the Felipe Cossío del Pomar Association also keep art alive.

Popular crafts from Piura include Chulucana pottery, and Catacaos is famous for its hats and its silversmithing. The small town of Simbila, is very popular for its handcrafts and pottery.

=== Cuisine ===
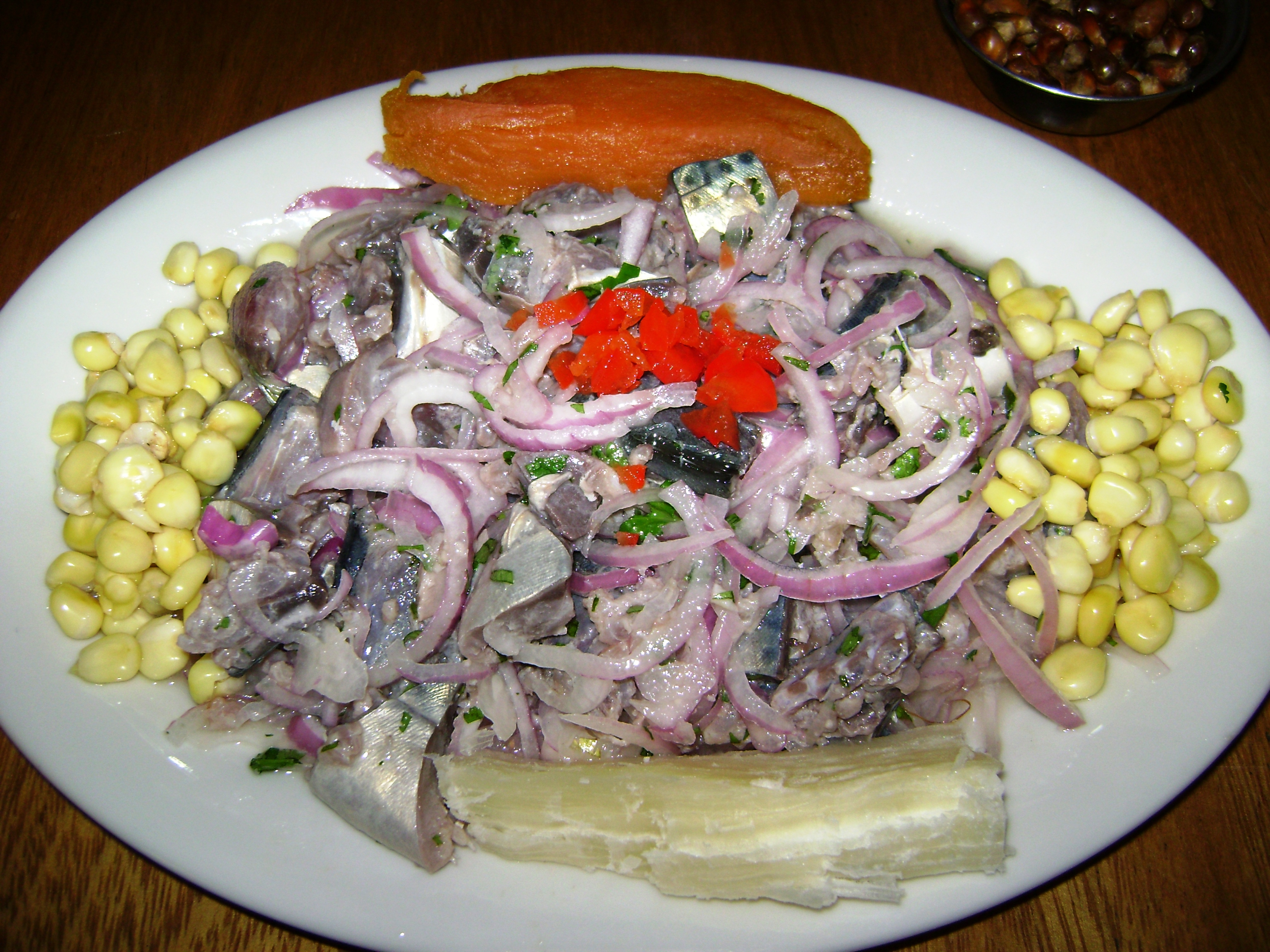
Ceviche de Caballa

Piura is host to a mestizo culture (one of the oldest in South America, for Piura is the third Spanish city founded on that continent) most famous for gastronomical dishes like Seco de chabelo, algarrobina-based drinks, many types of seafood and fish, like ceviche and Natilla Sweets. Ceviche de Caballa is a recognizable dish from Piura, served with mackerel. Piurano chifles are also a very recognizable food.

=== Music and dance ===
The tondero and cumanana are the traditional music of mestizo Piura and northern parts of Lambayeque and Peru. Tondero, a typical dance of Piura, originated in the valley of Alto Piura in the province of Morropón during the 18th and 19th century, in which many mansions were constructed. There are also several famous Peruvian Waltz that came from these regions (northern Peruvians have their own style).

=== Sport ===
The most popular sport in Piura is Association football (soccer). The cities largest football club is Atlético Grau, which participates in the Peruvian Primera División. Other football clubs in Piura include Sport Escudero, and Sport Liberal, both participating in the Copa Perú. Piura was one of the host cities for the 2005 FIFA U-17 World Championship, where its stadium, Estadio Miguel Grau, hosted. The stadium is named after the Peruvian war hero, Miguel Grau Seminario and has a capacity of 25,500. The stadium recently was approved for a renovation, after years of being left abandoned.

Other popular sports in the city are athletics, volleyball and surfing. Indoor sports such as handball, basketball and futsal are also very popular in the city.

== Churches and religion ==
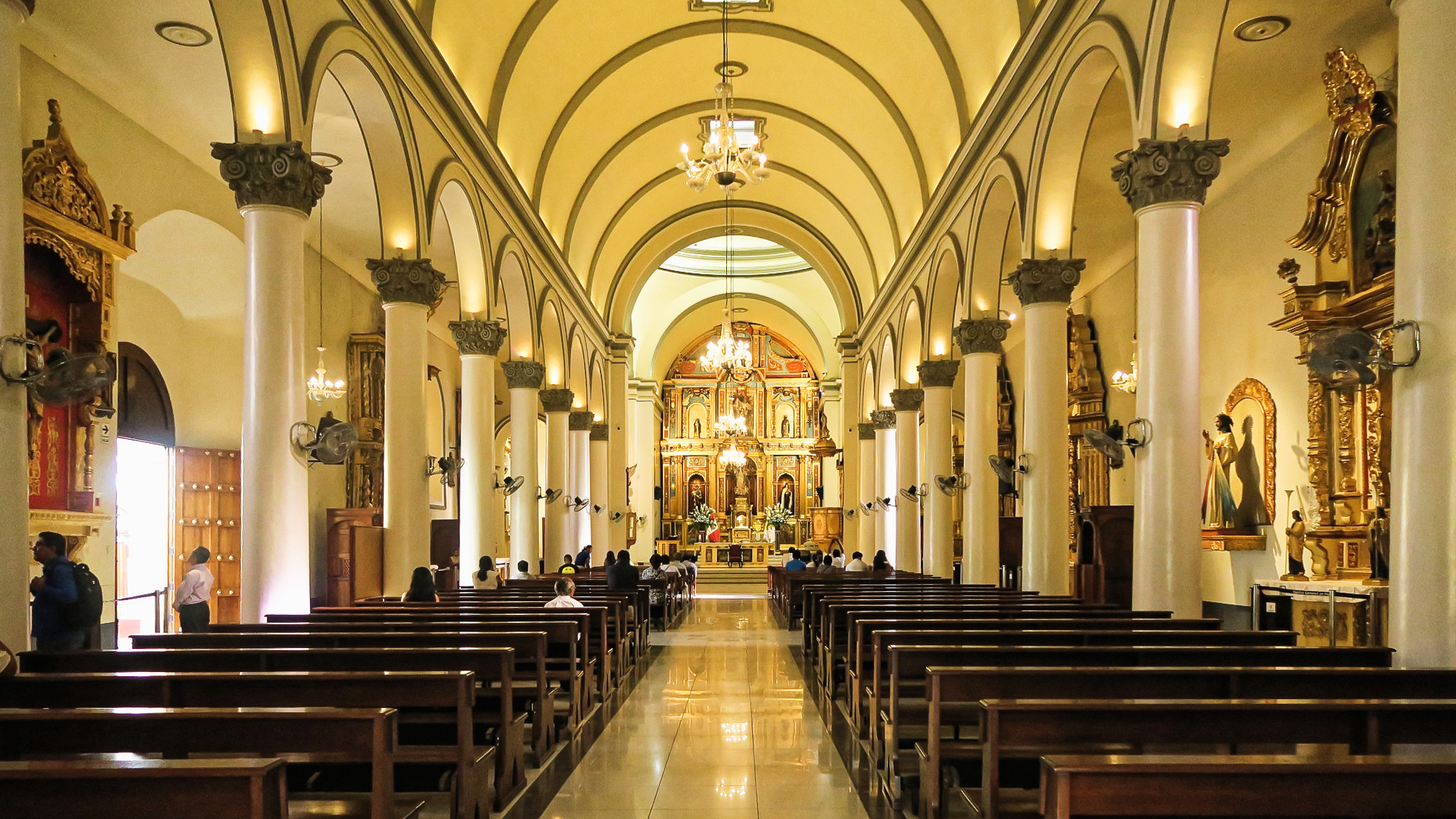
Inside of the Piura Cathedral

The most practiced religion in Piura is Catholicism. Piura is home to the Roman Catholic Archdiocese of Piura, which was established 1940. It is based in the Catedral de San Miguel Arcángel, also known as the Piura Cathedral or Catedral de Piura. Naturalized Peruvian citizen Robert Francis Prevost, elected as Pope Leo XIV 2025, was Bishop of Chiclayo from 2015 to 2023, part of the Archdiocese of Piura. The city is home is many churches, with the most iconic being:

- Piura Cathedral, founded in 1588, located in the Plena Plaza de Armas
- Iglesia San Francisco, founded by the Franciscan Order
- Iglesia San Sebastian, founded in 1911
- Iglesia María Auxiliadora
- La Iglesia de Jesucristo de Los Santos de Los Últimos Días

== Education ==
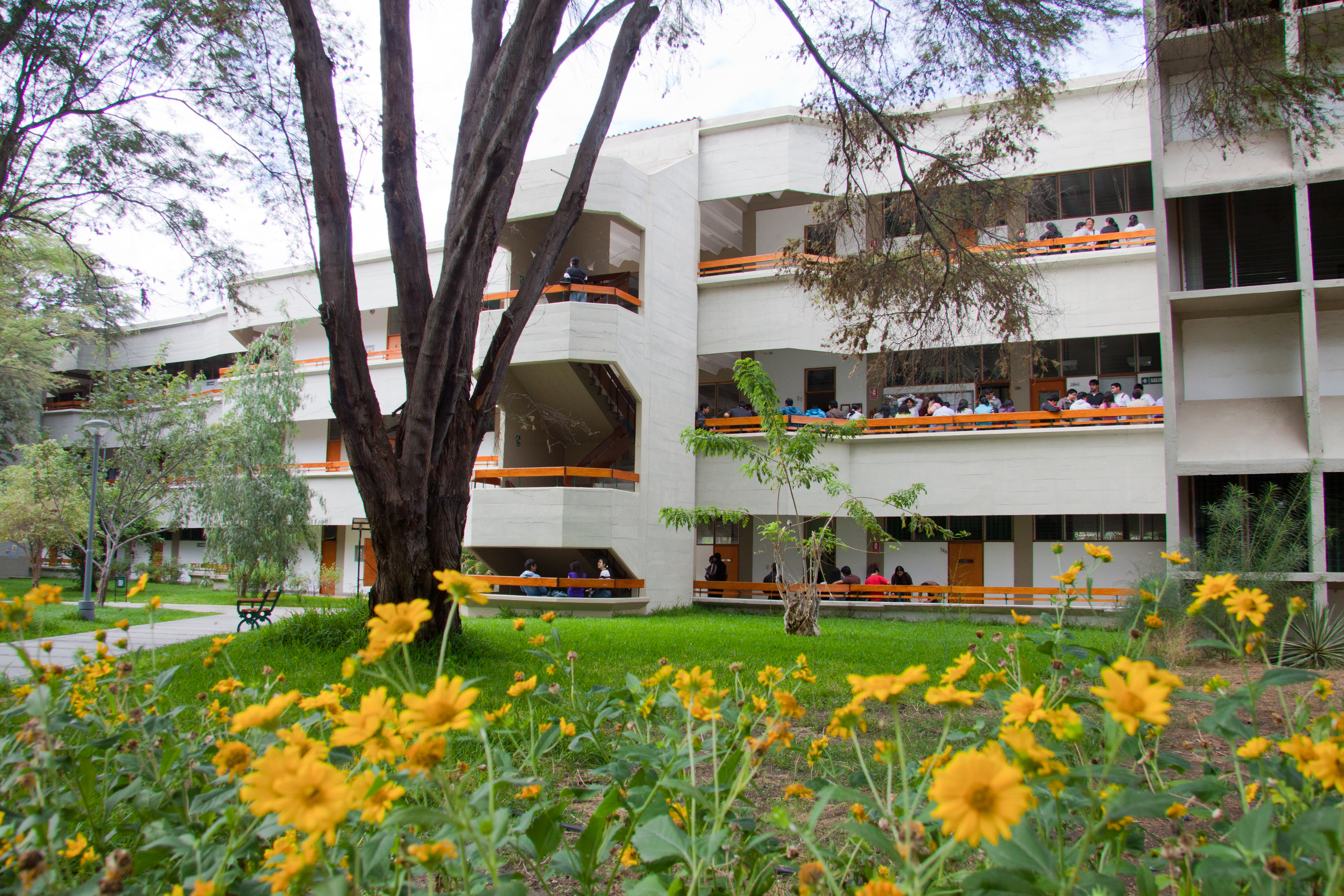
Engineering building of the University of Piura

=== Universities ===
The city of Piura has a considerable offer in terms of university vocational training centers; The following universities and a recognized Professional Technical School for business training operate there:

- University of Piura (UDEP)
- National University of Piura (UNP)

Branches of:

- Peruvian Wings University (UAP)
- César Vallejo University (UCV)
- The Angels of Chimbote University (ULADECH)
- Antenor Orrego Private University (UPAO)
- Saint Peter University (USP)

== Transportation ==
=== Road ===
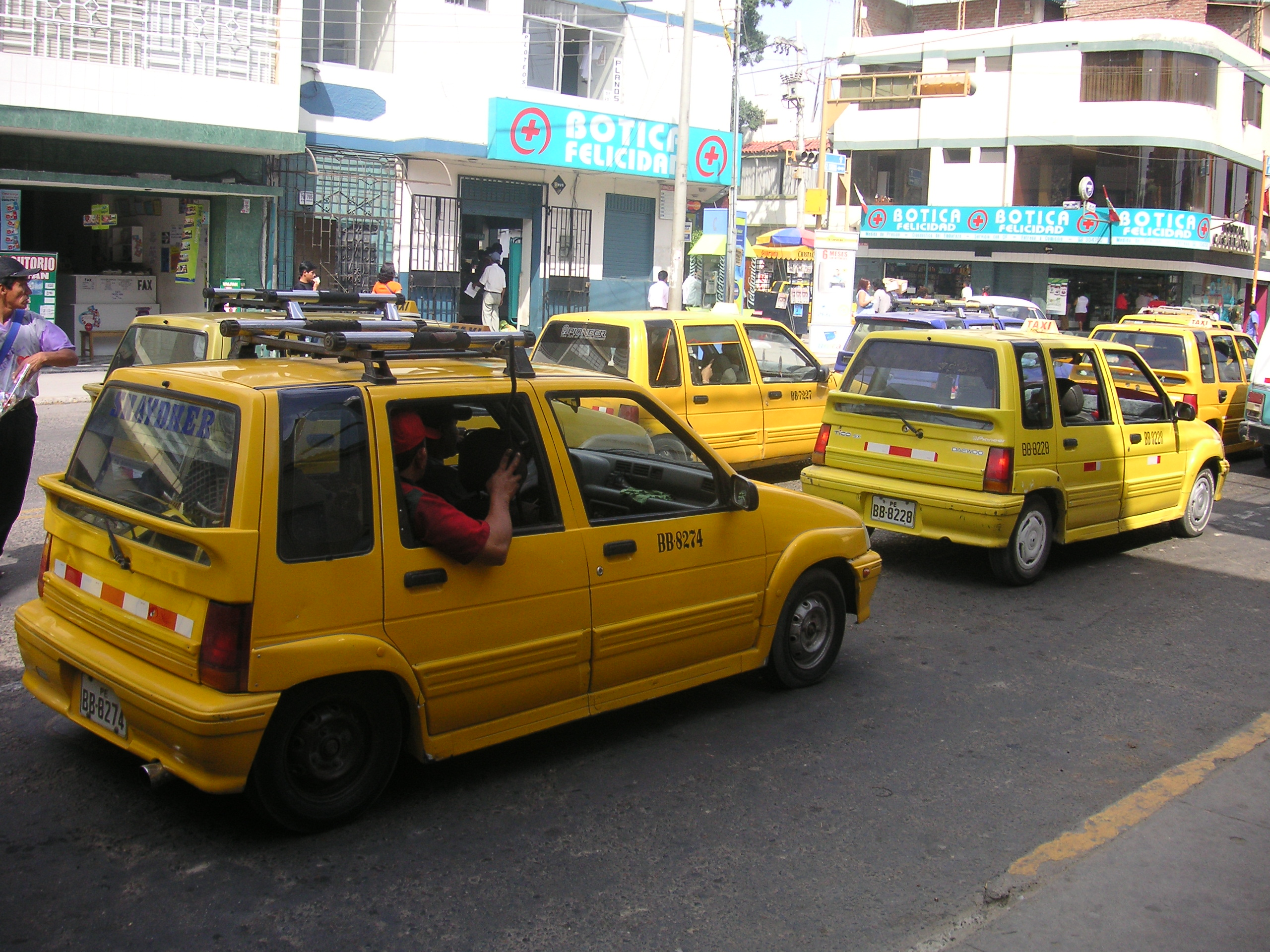
Taxis in Piura

The Pan-American Highway goes right through Piura and connects it to other cities in Peru and South America. Mototaxi's are a common form of transportation in the city, offering taxi or business's services. There are several public transport routes in the city, mainly made up of buses, minibuses and combis. In turn, you can find many taxis, motorcycle taxis and colectivos scattered throughout the city.

Currently, the works of the new project of a rapid transit bus system called "Metropolitan Corridor of Piura" which would cross the city from east to west, contemplating a route of more than 14 km along the axis composed of Sánchez Cerro and Guardia Civil avenues, are in the execution project.The project is being promoted by the Ministry of Transport and Communications and the Provincial Municipality of Piura, with the support of German and French Cooperation.

=== Air ===
Piura is served by the Cap. FAP Guillermo Concha Iberico International Airport, which only has one direct destination to Lima's Jorge Chávez International Airport and is served by three airlines, LATAM Airlines Perú, Sky Airline Peru and JetSmart Perú. The Peruvian Air Force Air Group Nº 7 is headquartered in Piura. The Air Squadron 711 "Scorpions" are stationed at the airport, operating Cessna A-37 Dragonfly's.

=== Rail ===
The city served a rail route to the nearby cities of Sullana and Paita since 1910, but has not served any more passengers, only providing occasional cargo. A project known as the Tren de la Costa is planned. The project aims to serve all cities along the Peruvian coast from Ica to Sullana. The railway would go through Piura, connecting the city with many others.

== Notable people ==
- Francisco del Castillo Andraca (1716–1770), Peruvian poet, writer and priest
- Miguel Grau Seminario (1834-1879), Peruvian naval officer and war hero of the War of the Pacific

== Sister cities ==
- Empalme, Mexico
- Loja, Ecuador
- Oklahoma City, United States
- Trujillo, Spain
