= List of universities in Peru =

This list of universities in Peru includes officially recognized public and private universities in Peru, sorted by region. In 2015, enrollment was divided into 979,896 for private universities and 333,501 for public universities. The average number of years of schooling in Peru for students born after 1980 was 11.4 years in 2018, and 12.6 years for Lima, with expected years of schooling being 14.2 years overall.

They are regulated by the National Superintendence of Higher University Education (SUNEDU)

On May 12, is instituted as the "Day of Peruvian Universities", due to being the date of creation of the University of San Marcos, the oldest in the Americas.

== Nationwide ==
=== Department of Lima ===
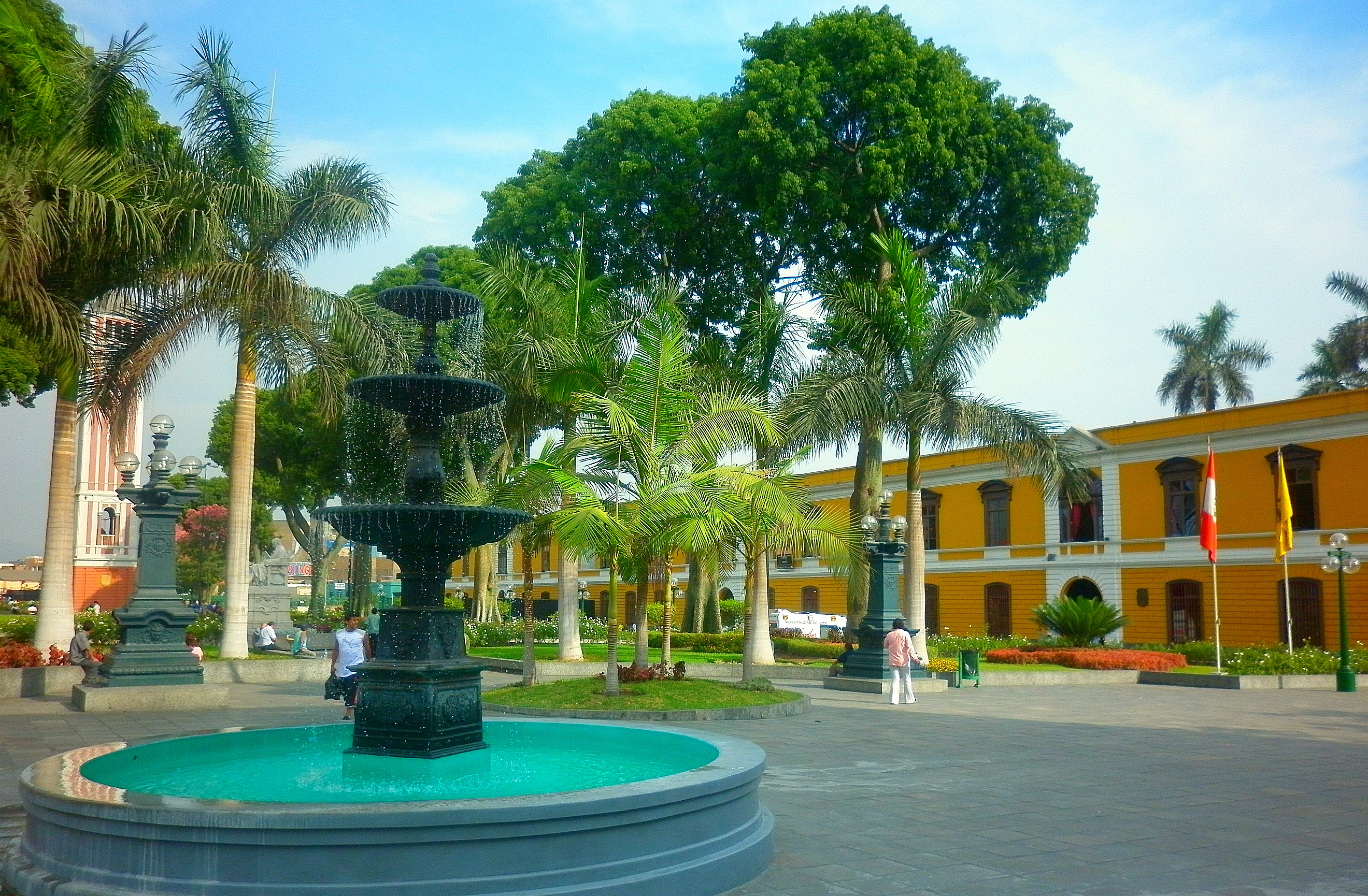
Universidad Nacional Mayor de San Marcos in Lima

- Universidad Nacional Mayor de San Marcos (UNMSM)
- Universidad Nacional de Ingeniería (UNI)
- Universidad Nacional Federico Villarreal (UNFV)
- Universidad Nacional José Faustino Sánchez Carrión, Huacho (UNJFSC)
- Universidad Nacional de Educación Enrique Guzmán y Valle, Chosica (UNE)
- Universidad Nacional de Música (UNM)
- Universidad Nacional Tecnológica de Lima Sur (UNTELS)
- Universidad Peruana Cayetano Heredia (UPCH)
- Universidad Nacional Agraria La Molina (UNALM)
- Universidad de Lima (Private) (UL)
- Universidad del Pacífico (UP)
- Universidad Alas Peruanas (UAP)
- Universidad Antonio Ruiz de Montoya (UARM)
- Universidad Peruana de Ciencias Aplicadas (UPC)
- Universidad Católica Sedes Sapientiae (UCSS)
- Universidad Particular Marcelino Champagnat (UMCH)
- Universidad César Vallejo (UCV)

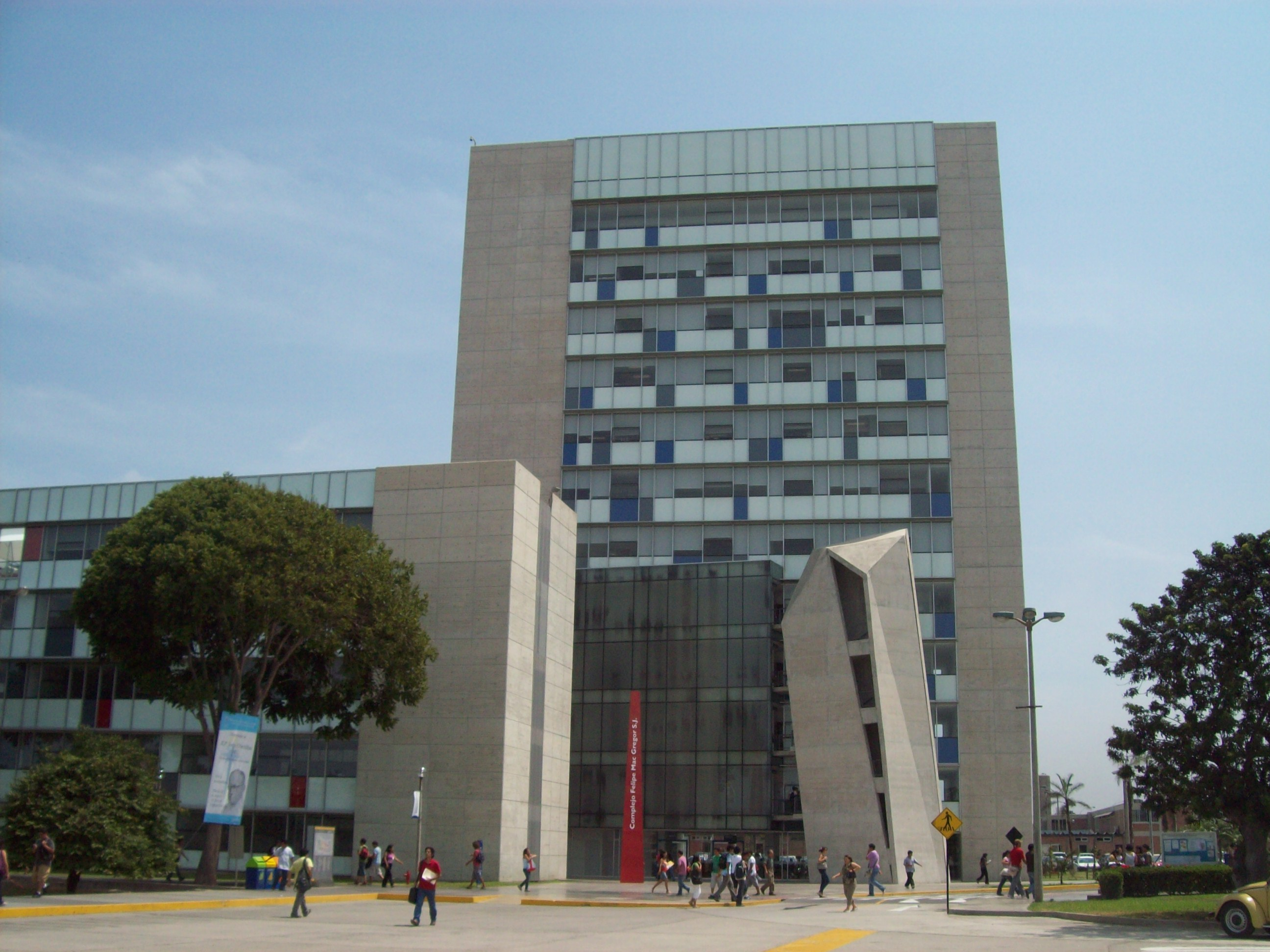
Pontificia Universidad Católica del Perú in Lima

- Universidad Científica del Sur (UCSUR)
- Universidad de Piura (UDEP), Lima
- Universidad de San Martín de Porres (USMP)
- Universidad Peruana Unión (UPEU)
- Universidad Ricardo Palma (URP)
- Universidad San Ignacio de Loyola (USIL)
- Universidad ESAN (UE)
- Universidad Femenina del Sagrado Corazón (UNIFE)
- Universidad Inca Garcilaso de la Vega (UIGV)
- Facultad de Teología Pontificia y Civil de Lima
- Pontificia Universidad Católica del Perú-Lima
- University of Sciences and Arts of Latin America (UCAL)
- Universidad Peruana de Ciencias e Informática (UPCI)
- Universidad Peruana de las Americas
- Universidad Tecnológica del Perú (UTP)
- TECH Technological University
- Faculty of Pontifical and Civil Theology of Lima (FTPCL)

=== Region of Callao ===
- Universidad Nacional del Callao, Bellavista, Callao
- Escuela Nacional de Marina Mercante "Almirante Miguel Grau", La Punta, Callao

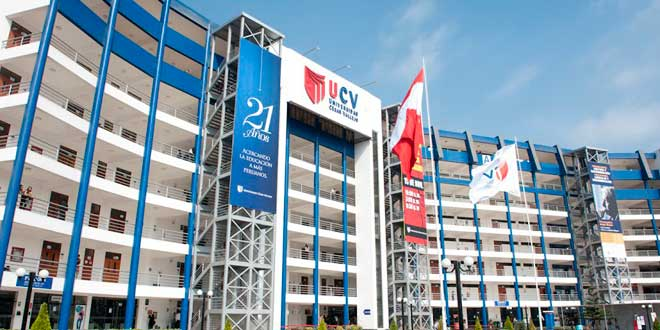
Universidad Cesar Vallejo in Trujillo

=== Northern regions ===
- National University of Trujillo, Trujillo
- National University Toribio Rodríguez de Mendoza, Chachapoyas
- Universidad Nacional Pedro Ruiz Gallo, Lambayeque
- Universidad Nacional de Cajamarca, Cajamarca
- Universidad Nacional de Jaen, Jaen
- Universidad Nacional de la Amazonía Peruana, Iquitos
- Universidad Nacional de San Martín
- Universidad Nacional de Piura, Piura
- Cesar Vallejo University, Trujillo
- Private University of the North, Trujillo
- Private University of Trujillo, Trujillo
- Universidad de Piura (UDEP), Piura
- Universidad Señor de Sipan, Lambayeque
- Antenor Orrego Private University, Trujillo
- Catholic University of Trujillo, Trujillo
- Universidad Privada Antonio Guillermo Urrelo, Cajamarca
- Universidad Católica Santo Toribio de Mogrovejo, Lambayeque
- Universidad de Chiclayo, Chiclayo
- Universidad Particular de Iquitos
- Universidad de Lambayeque, Chiclayo
- Universidad Privada Juan Mejía Baca, Chiclayo
- Leonardo Da Vinci Private University, Trujillo
- Universidad San Pedro, Sullana
- Universidad Nacional Autónoma de Alto Amazonas, Yurimaguas
- Universidad Nacional Autónoma de Chota, Chota
- Universidad Nacional Ciro Alegría, Huamachuco
- Universidad Nacional Intercultural Fabiola Salazar Leguía de Bagua, Bagua
- Universidad Nacional Tecnológica de Frontera San Ignacio de Loyola, San Ignacio

=== Central regions ===
- Universidad Nacional de Áncash Santiago Antúnez de Mayolo, Huaraz
- Universidad Nacional del Centro del Perú (UNCP), Huancayo
- Universidad Nacional Daniel Alcides Carrión, Cerro de Pasco
- Universidad Nacional de Ucayali, Pucallpa
- Universidad Continental de Ciencias e Ingeniería, Huancayo
- Catholic University Los Angeles of Chimbote, Chimbote
- Los Andes Peruvian University (UPLA), Huancayo

==== Department of Huánuco ====
- Universidad Nacional Hermilio Valdizán, Department of Huánuco, Huánuco
- University of Huanuco, Department of Huánuco, Huánuco

=== Southern regions ===
- Universidad Nacional San Cristóbal de Huamanga, Ayacucho
- Universidad Nacional San Antonio Abad del Cusco, Cusco
- Universidad Nacional de San Agustín (UNSA), Arequipa
- Universidad Tecnológica de los Andes, Abancay
- Universidad Católica de San Pablo, Arequipa
- Universidad Católica de Santa María, Arequipa
- Universidad Andina del Cusco, Cusco
- Universidad Peruana Austral de Cusco, Cusco
- Universidad Nacional de Huancavelica, Huancavelica
- Universidad Nacional San Luis Gonzaga, Ica
- Universidad Andina del Cusco, Puerto Maldonado
- Universidad Nacional San Antonio Abad del Cusco, Puerto Maldonado
- Universidad de Moquegua, Moquegua
- Universidad Andina Néstor Cáceres Velásquez, Juliaca
- Universidad Nacional del Altiplano, Puno
- Universidad Nacional Jorge Basadre Grohmann, Tacna
- Universidad Privada de Tacna, Tacna
