= Piura Cathedral =

Coordinates: 5.1966°S 80.6268°W

St. Michael the Archangel Cathedral
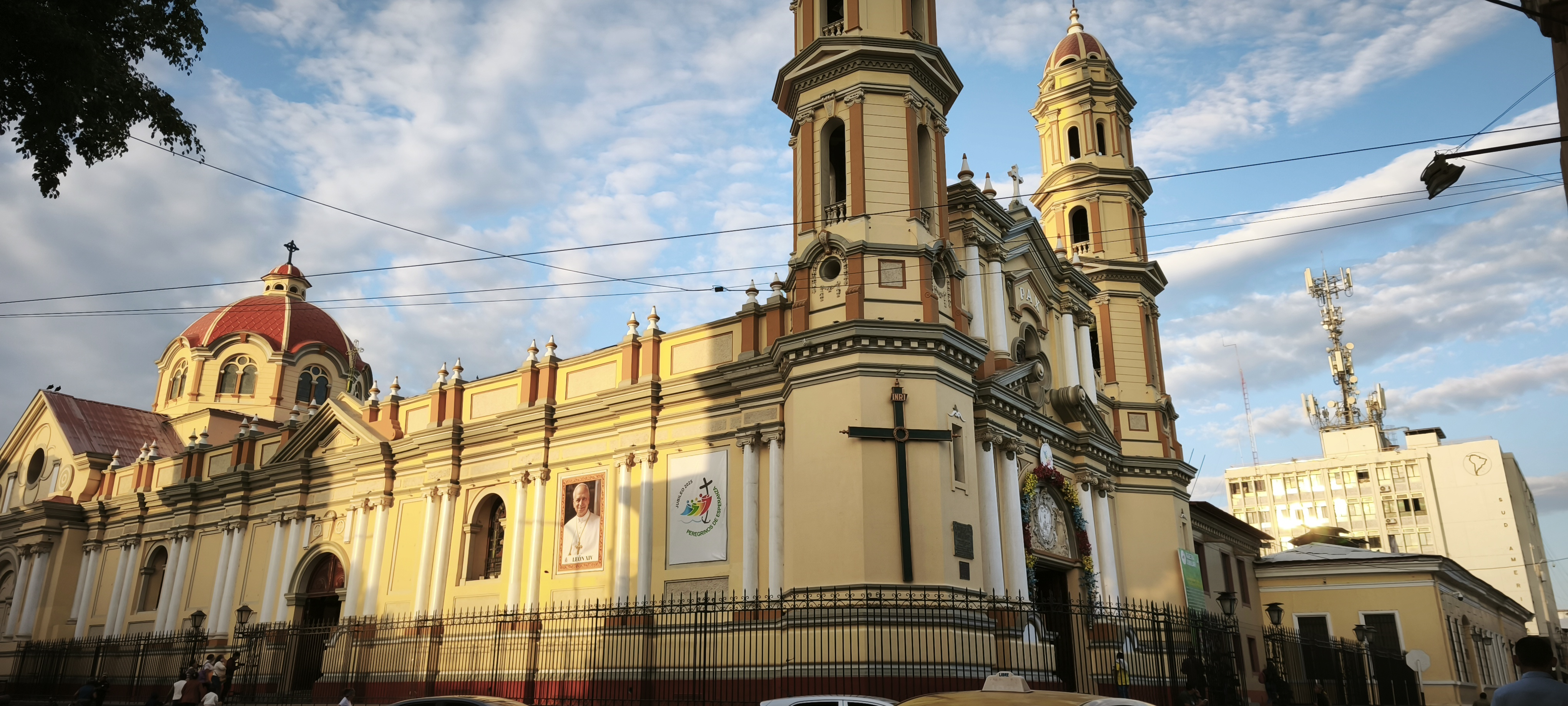
- St. Michael the Archangel Cathedral
- Location: Piura
- Country: Peru
- Denomination: Roman Catholic Church

Administration
- Archdiocese: Roman Catholic Archdiocese of Piura

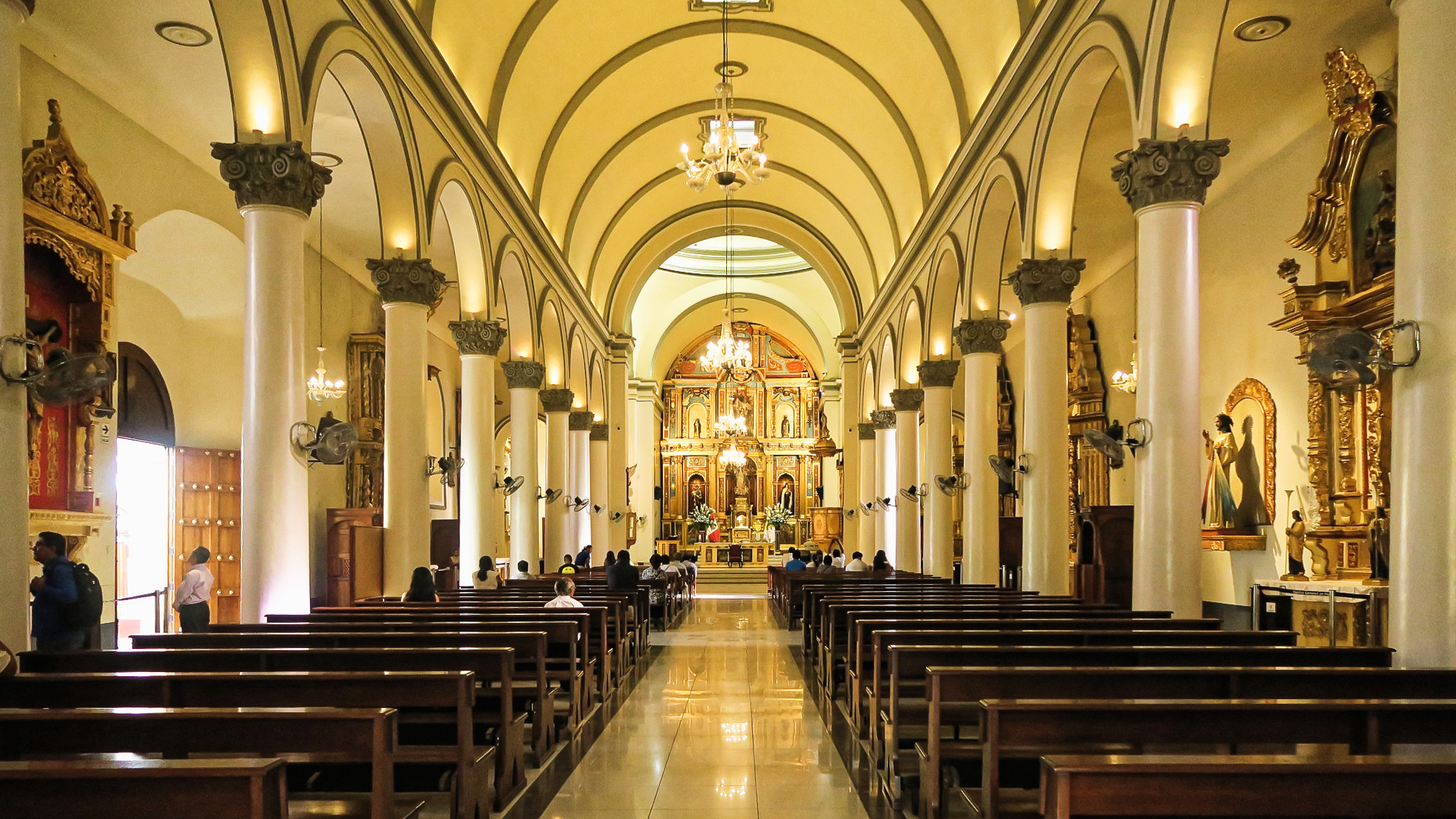
The interior of Piura Cathedral

The St. Michael the Archangel Cathedral, (Spanish: Basílica Catedral San Miguel Arcángel) also called Piura Cathedral, is a religious building affiliated to the Catholic Church that is located in the city of Piura, Peru.

It is located specifically between the Huancavelica and Tacna streets, in the place of arms of Piura. It was built in 1588. It was declared a Colonial Historical Monument by local authorities.

It is a temple with Neo-Renaissance elements that follows the Roman or Latin rite and is the mother church of the metropolitan Archdiocese of Piura (Archidioecesis Piurensis) that was created as a diocese in 1940 through the bull "Ad christianae plebis" of Pope Pius XII and Was elevated to its present status in 1966 by Pope Paul VI.

It is under the pastoral responsibility of Archbishop José Antonio Eguren Anselmi.

== See also ==
- Roman Catholicism in Peru
- St. Michael the Archangel
