= Los Andes Peruvian University =

Private University in Peru

Coordinates: 12°02′29″S 75°11′29″W

"Los Andes" Peruvian University
- Universidad Peruana "Los Andes"
- Seal of "Los Andes" Peruvian University, Huancayo
- Motto: Spanish: Hacia la Excelencia Académica
- Motto in English: Towards Academic Excellency
- Type: Private
- Established: 1983
- Affiliations: SUNEDU
- Chancellor: Dr. Eutimio Catalino Jara Rodríguez
- Undergraduates: 21 387
- Location: Huancayo, Peru
- Campus: Urban
- Locations: 7 campuses & learning centers, online
- Colours: Blue; White
- Website: upla.edu

The Los Andes Peruvian University (UPLA) (Spanish: Universidad Peruana Los Andes) is an educational institution created on December 30, 1983 (Law Nº 23.757). The main campus is situated in Huancayo, Peru. It is one of the most prosperous universities in the central region of the country. It is named after the Andes mountains, which surround the city of Huancayo.

== History ==
At its inception in 1983, the university offered courses in the four areas of study most relevant and important to the region: Industrial Engineering, Agricultural Engineering, Business Management and Technology Education. On June 23, 1987 a Complementary Law Nº 24697 Civil Engineering was added to the program of studies. More recently, new faculties have been established with a view to affording opportunities in new professional careers. Some of the original faculties have been upgraded, in accordance with technological and social requirements and in keeping with current innovations in tertiary education. These were authorized by Asamblea Nacional de Rectores, an institution which governs universities in Peru, with Resolution Nº 446-ANR-93 and Asamblea Universitaria Resolution Nº 001-93-AU on December 8, 1993.

=== Academic areas ===
- Faculty of Medicine

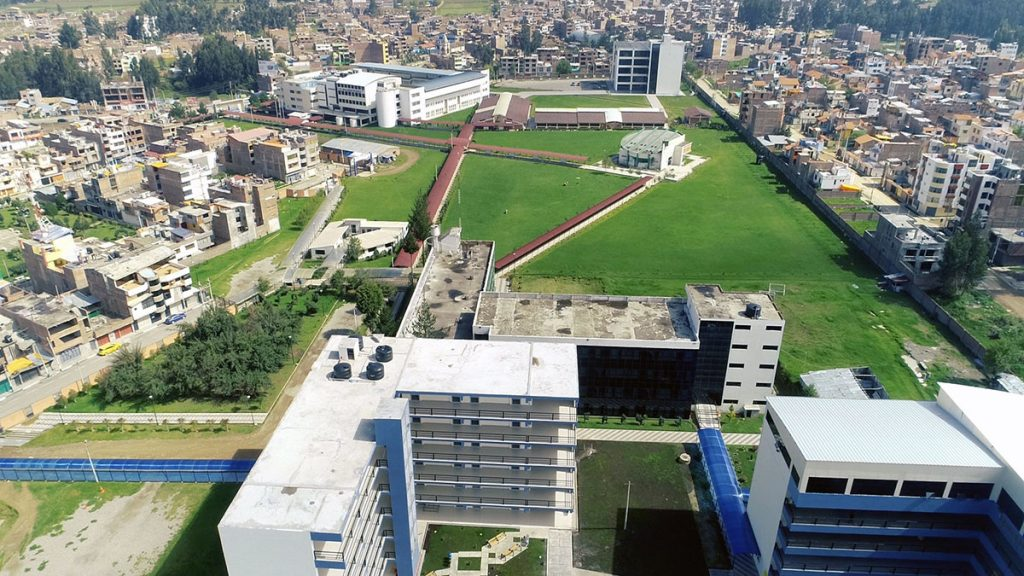
The main campus of the university - Huancayo.

- Faculty of Health Science
  - UPLA Pharmacy and Biochemistry
  - UPLA Veterinary Medicine
  - UPLA Obstetrics
  - UPLA Dental Medicine
  - UPLA Optometry
  - UPLA Psychology
  - UPLA Nursing
  - UPLA Human Nutrition
  - UPLA Medical Technology
- Faculty of Business Science and Accountancy
  - UPLA Accountancy and Finance
  - UPLA Management and Systems
- Faculty of Law

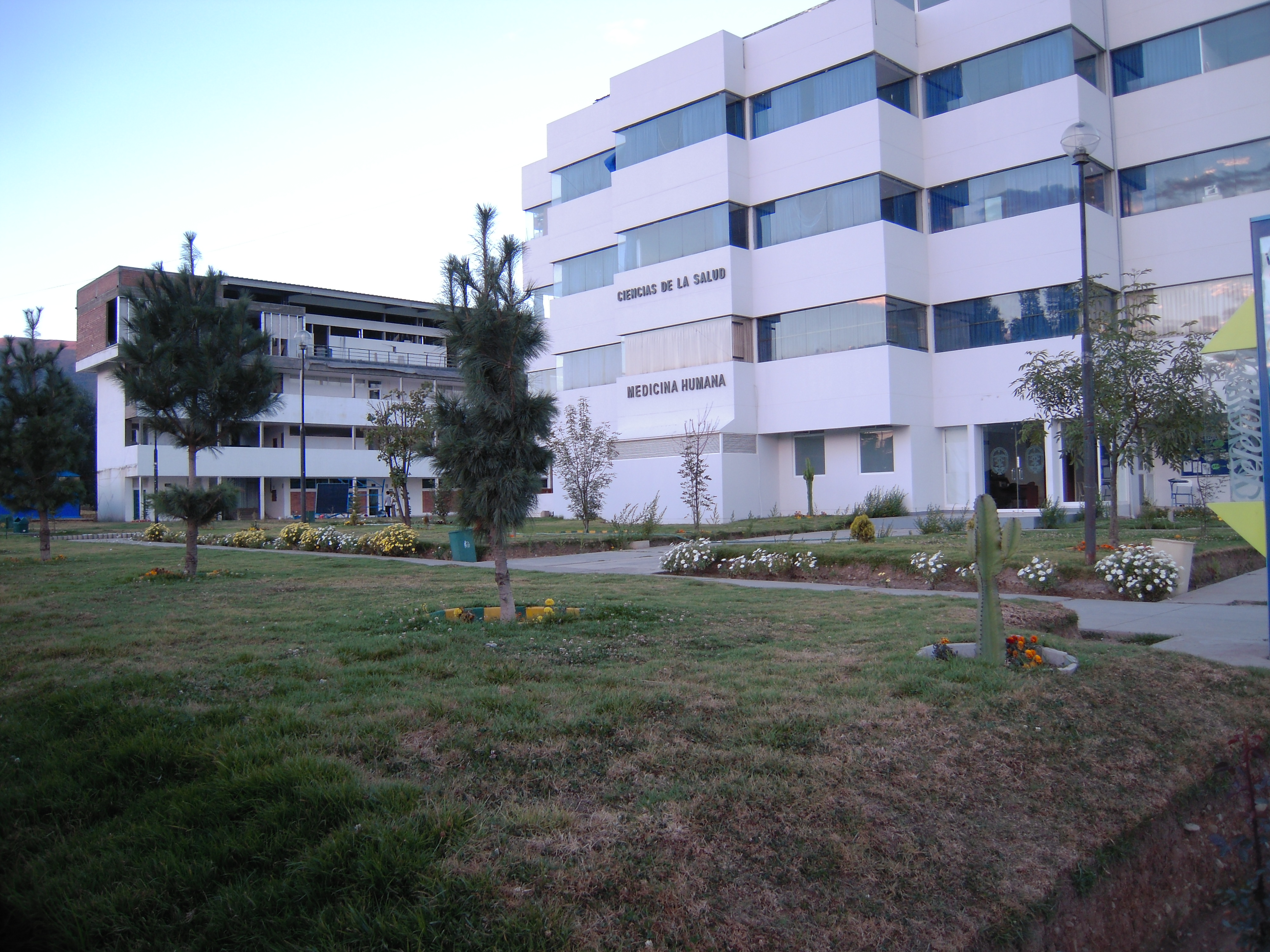
The Faculty of Medicine in Chorrillos - Huancayo.

- Faculty of Education
  - UPLA Initial Education
  - UPLA Primary Education
  - UPLA Secondary Education
- Faculty of Engineering
  - UPLA Computer and Systems Engineering
  - UPLA Civil Engineering
  - UPLA Architecture
  - UPLA Industrial Engineering

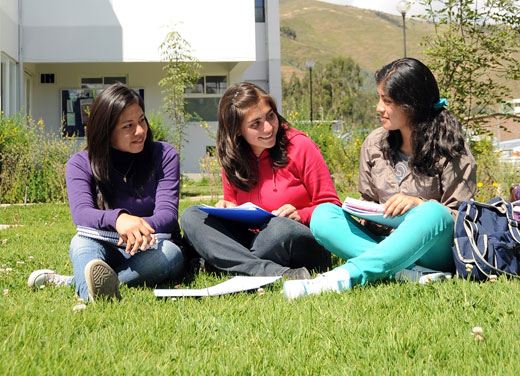
Students at the campus - Huancayo.

== University, industry and society ==
=== Industry ===
In 1973 in Junín Region - Concepción, with the cooperation of Federal Republic of Germany, a milk plant was created. It was named "Fongal Centro". Today it is called The Milk Plant of Mantaro - PLEMSA and is part of Los Andes Peruvian University. It produces pasteurized milk, double and triple cream cheese, fresh cheese, yogurt and butter by professionals and students (who make theirs using practice-based professional learning).

=== Athletics ===
The University hosted its first marathon, the UPLA International Marathon, in 2008. Participants in this event include athletes from the surrounding regions as well as visiting athletes from other countries.

=== Alumni ===
Many of UPLA's alumni have had considerable success in scientific research, public service, education, and business.

Legal graduate Inés Melchor represented Peru internationally as a long-distance runner.

== See also ==
- List of universities in Peru
