= University of Piura =

Private university in Peru

- Universidad de Piura
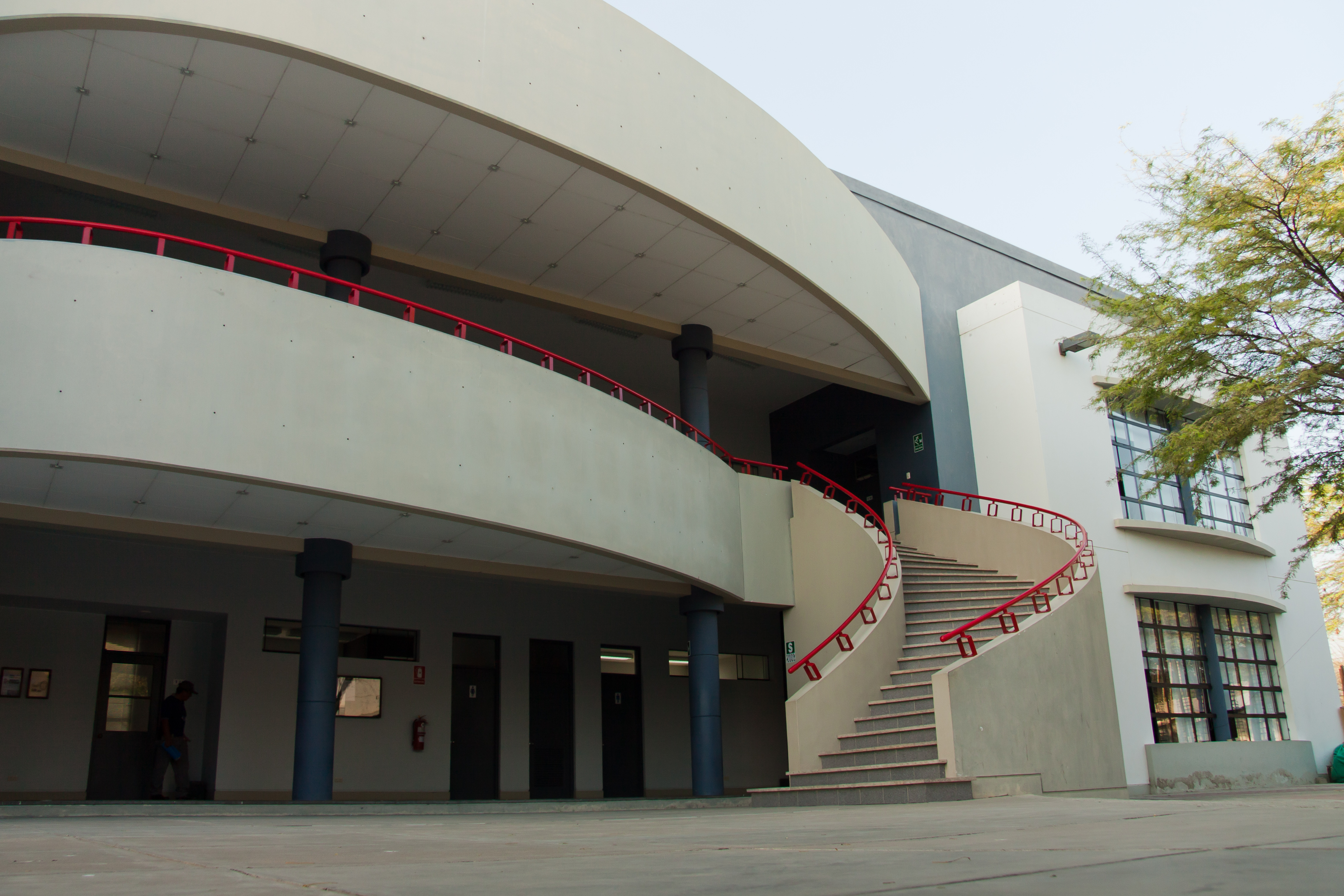
- ETS building
- Other names: UDEP
- Motto: Universitas Studiorum Piurensis
- Motto in English: The universal study of knowledge in Piura
- Type: Private university
- Established: April 7, 1969 (57 years ago)
- Chancellor: Fernando Ocáriz Braña
- Vice-Chancellor: Ángel Gómez-Hortigüela
- Rector: Paul Corcuera García
- Founder: Josemaría Escrivá
- Students: 10,170 (2017)
- Undergraduates: 7,605
- Postgraduates: 2,565
- Location: Piura: Av. Ramón Mugica 131, Urb. San Eduardo; Lima: Av. Mártir Olaya 162, Miraflores, Piura and Lima, Peru; 5.17669230°S 80.63464340°W
- Campus: Urban
- Vice Rectors: Marcos Agurto; María Pía Chirinos; Susana Vegas
- Colors: Gray; White; Blue
- Website: udep.edu.pe/international/

The University of Piura (Spanish: Universidad de Piura; "UDEP") is a private university in Peru. It has two campuses, the main one is in Piura, while a more recently built one is located in the Miraflores District of Lima.

In 1964, Josemaría Escrivá, founder of Opus Dei, at a meeting with professors from the University of Navarra in Spain, decided to create a new university. It was founded by St. Josemaría Escrivá de Balaguer and in 1969, it was officially recognized as a university.

== Campuses ==
Piura Piura is the location of UDEP's main Campus, extending over 130 hectares. More than half of the land is reclaimed desert. It is reforested with mesquite trees where squirrels, deer, foxes, peacocks, lizards and different kinds of birds abound. Construction of the Piura Campus started in the late 1960s, with much of its infrastructure financed by international support from the Italian, Spanish, German and Canadian governments.

Lima UDEP has two campuses in Lima. The undergraduate students is located in the center of the Miraflores District, a picturesque suburban region of Lima on the Pacific coast. The graduate campus for Business Management is located in the district Surco of Lima. Its MBA is recognized as one of the top programs in Peru.

== Academic areas ==
School of Medicine

- Department of Medicine

School of Economics and Business

- Department of Mathematics
- Department of Marketing
- Department of Finance
- Department of Business Policy
- Department of General Administration
- Department of Accounting
- Department of Economics
- Department of Service Management

School of Engineering

- Department of Engineering Sciences
- Department of Industrial and Systems Engineering
- Department of Electrical Mechanical Engineering
- Department of Civil Engineering
- Institute of Hydraulics, Hydrology and Sanitary Technology
- Department of Architecture

School of Communication

- Department of Audiovisual Communication and Online Media
- Department of Marketing
- Department of Journalism

School of Law

- Department of Fundamentals of Law
- Department of Public Law
- Department of Private Law

School of Humanities

- Department of History, Geography and Art
- Department of Language and Literature
- Department of Philosophy
- Department of Cultural Management
- Department of Psychology

School of Educational Sciences

- Department of Early Education
- Department of Primary Education
- Department of Secondary Education

== See also ==
- List of universities in Peru
