= Private University of Trujillo =

Private University in Peru

Coordinates: 8.1081°S 78.9944°W

Private University of Trujillo - UPRIT
- Universidad Privada de Trujillo - UPRIT
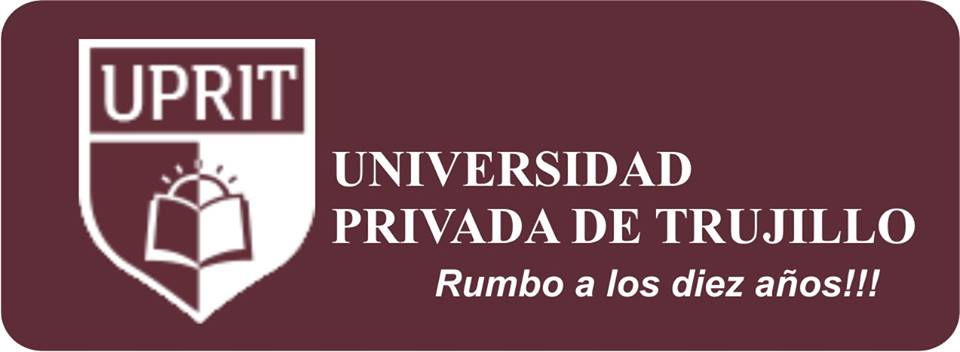
- Type: Private
- Established: October 11, 2006
- Rector: Dr.Antenor Guerra Martinez
- Students: 5,000
- Address: Industrial Highway Km.4 - Semi Rústica El Bosque; Trujillo, Trujillo, Peru
- Website: www.uprit.edu.pe

The Private University of Trujillo (UPRIT) is a Peruvian private university founded on October 11, 2006, in the city of Trujillo, La Libertad Region.

First University Licensed by SUNEDU with permanent institutional licensing and with the 2020 Licensing Regulations with greater demands for academic quality.

== History ==
The National Council for the operating license of Universities (CONAFU) authorized the Private University of Trujillo to develop its academic activities on October 11, 2006, by Resolution No. 334-2006, CONAFU and ratified by Resolution No. 378-2010-CONAFU.

The National Superintendence of University Education (SUNEDU) granted the institutional license to the Private University of Trujillo - UPRIT to offer the university higher educational service on November 8, 2024 through Resolution of the Board of Directors No. 0032-2024-Sunedu-CD.

== See also ==
- National University of Trujillo
- Universidad Privada de Trujillo
