= Universidad Católica de San Pablo =

Private University in Peru

Universidad Católica San Pablo
- Universidad Católica San Pablo (Spanish)
- Type: Private University
- Established: 1997; 29 years ago
- Rector: Dr. Germán Chávez Contreras
- Location: Arequipa, Peru; 16.3897524°S 71.5356732°W
- Website: www.ucsp.edu.pe
- Location within Peru

San Pablo Catholic University (Spanish: Universidad Católica San Pablo, UCSP) is a private university in Arequipa, Peru. Owned by the Sodalitium Christianae Vitae, it was founded in 1997.

The university has two campuses, one in Salaverry avenue, and one in Campiña Paisajista urb. As of 2009, it hosted 5,000 students. In addition, the university runs a number of research centers and institutes.

== See also ==
- Official website
- List of universities in Peru
