= Francisco del Castillo Andraca =

Peruvian poet, writer and priest (1716–1770)

Francisco del Castillo, O. de M. or Francisco del Castillo Andraca (1716–1770) was a Peruvian poet, writer and priest of the Order of Mercy. Not to be confused with his namesake Francisco del Castillo, SJ (Jesuit of the seventeenth century), also from Lima.

Blind from birth, he was known as El Ciego de La Merced (The Blind Man from Mercy), and was a talented poet who combined wit and humor in his verses. Ricardo Palma would make a short biography of him (with some poems included), in his Peruvian Traditions.
