= National University Toribio Rodríguez de Mendoza =

Peruvian state-owned university

- Universidad Nacional Toribio Rodríguez de Mendoza
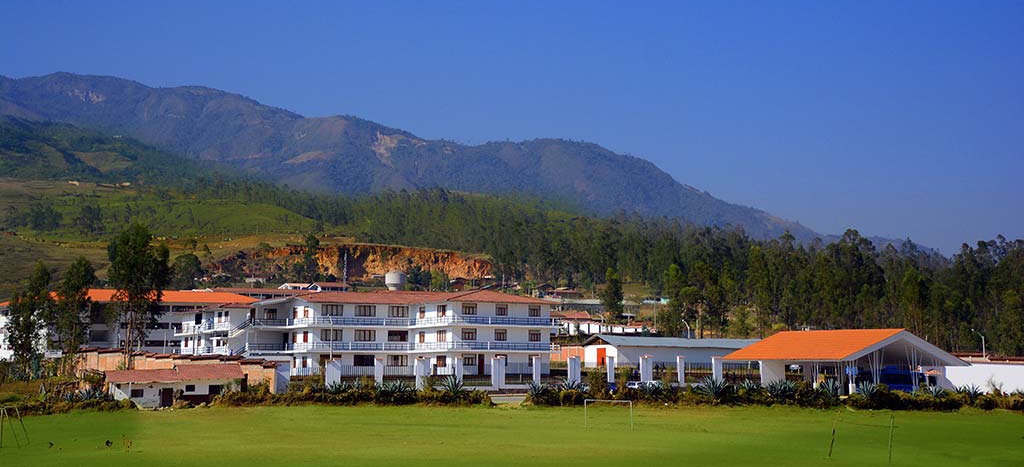
- Type: Public university
- Established: 18 September 2000
- Location: Chachapoyas, Amazonas, Peru; 6.233°S 77.854°W
- Website: www.untrm.edu.pe
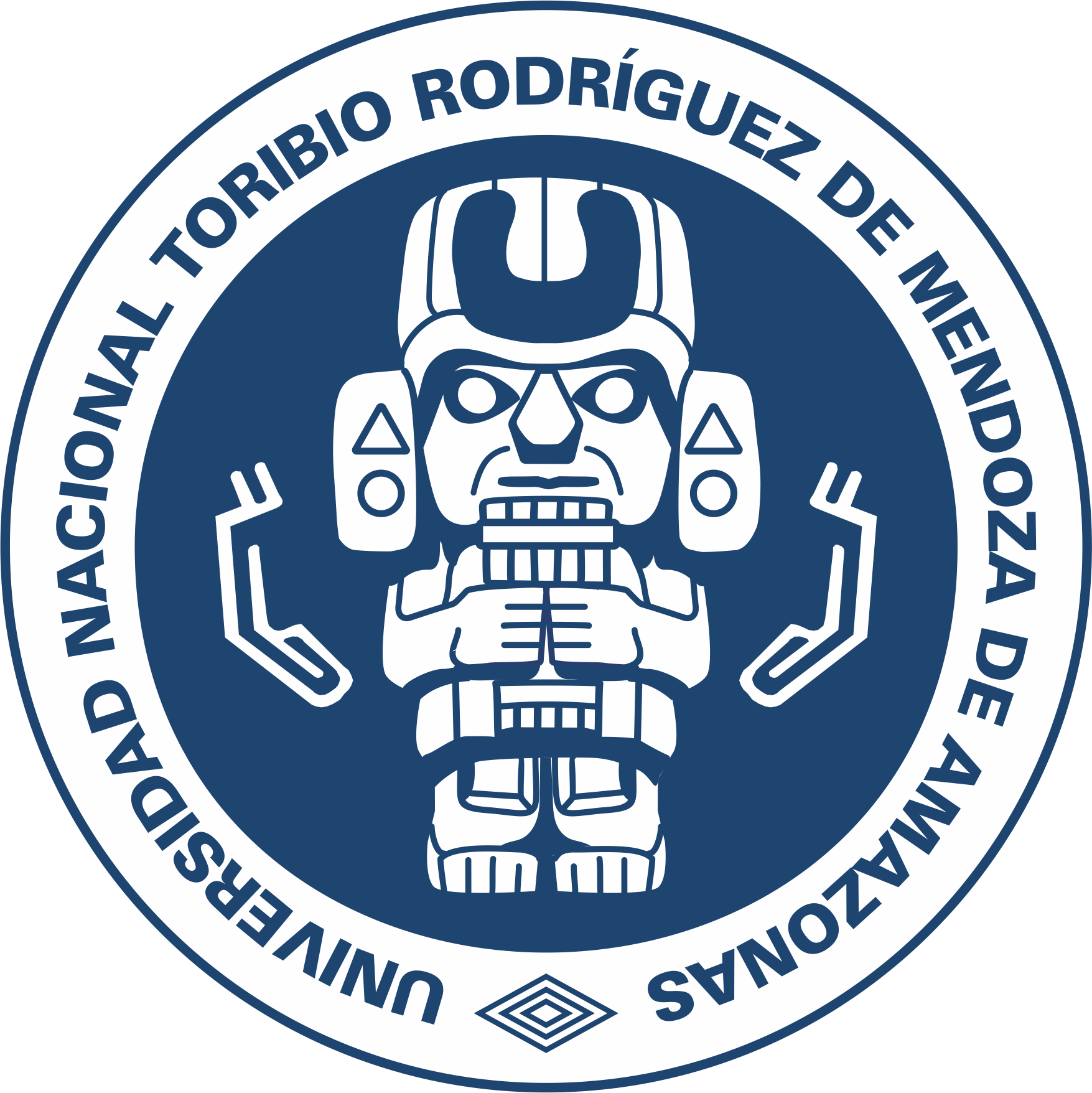

The National University Toribio Rodríguez de Mendoza (UNTRM) is a state-owned university in Chachapoyas, Peru. The UNTRM was founded on September 18, 2000.

In 2016, it was the first Peruvian university to clone an animal: the calf "Alma"

== See also ==
- Official website
- List of universities in Peru
