= Ambassadors of Peru =

Diplomatic position of Peru

Ambassadors of Peru are persons nominated by the president to serve as the country's diplomatic representatives to foreign nations and international organizations.

== Current representatives ==
The following is the list of ambassadors of Peru as of January 2025. Please note that the column dedicated to concurrent accreditations also includes past countries in italics and that it is subject to change.

Host country	List	Head of mission	Position	Website	Concurrency	Appointed
Algeria	List	Jorge Eduardo Wurst Calle	Ambassador	Algiers	Countries: Libya; Tunisia	February 1, 2023
Argentina	List	Carlos Alberto Chocano Burga	Ambassador	Buenos Aires	—N/a	April 1, 2023
Australia	List	Vitaliano Gaspar Gallardo Valencia	Ambassador	Canberra	Countries: Solomon Islands; Fiji; Papua New Guinea; Vanuatu	February 1, 2022
Austria	List	María Eugenia Echeverría Herrera Vda. de De Pury	Ambassador	Vienna	Countries: Slovakia; Slovenia	January 15, 2025
Belgium	List	Luis Enrique Chávez Basagoitia	Ambassador	Brussels	Countries: European Union; Luxembourg	December 1, 2022
Bolivia	List	Carlos Jaime Montoya Montero	Chargé d'affaires	La Paz	—N/a	
Brazil	List	Rómulo Fernando Acurio Traverso	Ambassador	Brasília	Countries: Suriname	January 1, 2022
Canada	List	Manuel Gerardo Talavera Espinar	Ambassador	Ottawa	—N/a	July 15, 2023
Chile	List	Silvia Elena Alfaro Espinosa	Ambassador	Santiago	—N/a	September 1, 2023
China	List	Marco Vinicio Balarezo Lizarzaburu	Ambassador	Beijing	Countries: Mongolia; Pakistan; North Korea	March 15, 2023
Colombia	List	Mariano Ernesto López Black	Chargé d'affaires (a.i.)	Bogotá	—N/a	
Costa Rica	List	Carlos Guillermo Hakansson Nieto	Ambassador	San José	—N/a	March 1, 2024
Cuba	List	Gonzalo Flavio Guillén Beker	Ambassador	Havana	—N/a	March 1, 2022
Czech Republic	List	Carlos Mario Del Castillo Giuffra	Head of Chancery	Prague	—N/a	
Dominican Republic	List	Gustavo Felipe José Lembcke Hoyle	Ambassador	Santo Domingo	Countries: Haiti; Saint Kitts and Nevis	July 15, 2022
Ecuador	List	José Eduardo Zeballos Valle	Ambassador	Quito	—N/a	March 1, 2023
Egypt	List	Martín Eduardo Palacios Rangel	Head of Chancery	Cairo	Countries: Jordan; Syria; Lebanon	
El Salvador	List	Jorge Antonio Rosado La Torre	Ambassador	San Salvador	Countries: Belize	June 15, 2023
Finland	List	Ernesto Moisés Pinto Bazurco Rittler	Ambassador	Helsinki	Countries: Estonia; Latvia; Lithuania	March 1, 2024
France	List	Rolando Javier Ruiz Rosas Cateriano	Ambassador	Paris	Countries: Monaco	May 1, 2022
Germany	List	Augusto David Teodoro Arzubiaga Scheuch	Ambassador	Berlin	—N/a	February 1, 2023
Ghana	List	Rosa Liliana Gómez Cárdenas de Weston	Ambassador	Accra		August 1, 2023
Greece	List	Arturo Javier Arciniega Calderón	Ambassador	Athens	Countries: Albania; Bulgaria; Cyprus	April 15, 2024
Guatemala	List	Guido Octavio Toro Cornejo	Ambassador	Guatemala	—N/a	August 15, 2024
Holy See	List	Luis Juan Chuquihuara Chil	Ambassador	Vatican City	Countries: Sovereign Military Order of Malta	February 1, 2024
Honduras	List	Yvette Noemí Beoutis Candahuana	Chargé d'affaires (a.i.)	Tegucigalpa		
Hungary	List	Edgard Arturo Pérez Alván	Ambassador	Budapest	Countries: Bosnia and Herzegovina; Serbia; Croatia; Montenegro	April 1, 2023
India	List	Javier Manuel Paulinich Velarde	Ambassador	New Delhi	Countries: Bangladesh; Maldives; Nepal; Sri Lanka	February 1, 2023
Indonesia	List	Luis Raúl Tsuboyama Galván	Ambassador	Jakarta	Countries: ASEAN; East Timor	February 1, 2022
Ireland	List	Jaime Manuel Cacho-Sousa Velázquez	Ambassador	Dublin	—N/a	May 1, 2024
Israel	List	Javier Martín Sánchez Checa Salazar	Ambassador	Tel-Aviv	—N/a	May 1, 2024
Italy	List	Manuel José Antonio Cacho-Sousa Velázquez	Ambassador	Rome	Countries: San Marino; Malta	May 1, 2024
Japan	List	Roberto Hernán Seminario Portocarrero	Ambassador	Tokyo	—N/a	January 1, 2022
Kenya	List	Romy Sonia Tincopa Grados	Ambassador	Nairobi		May 1, 2024
Kuwait	List	Carlos Enrique Tomás Martín Jiménez Gil Fortoul	Ambassador	Kuwait		October 15, 2024
Malaysia	List	Ricardo Estanislao Morote Canales	Ambassador	Kuala Lumpur	Countries: Brunei; Cambodia	January 1, 2022
Mexico	List	Yesica Noemí Fonseca Martínez	Chargé d'affaires (a.i.)	Mexico	—N/a	
Morocco	List	Pedro Julio Díaz Vargas	Head of Chancery	Rabat	Countries: Mali; Mauritania; Senegal	
Netherlands	List	Franca Lorella Deza Ferreccio	Ambassador	Amsterdam	—N/a	November 1, 2024
New Zealand	List	José Emilio Bustinza Soto	Ambassador	Wellington	—N/a	March 1, 2022
Nicaragua	List	Bruno Castañeda Landi	Chargé d'affaires (a.i.)	Managua	—N/a	
Norway	List	Gustavo Julio Eduardo Francisco Laurie Escandón	Ambassador	Oslo	Countries: Iceland	August 15, 2023
Panama	List	Mario Juvenal López Chávarri	Ambassador	Panama	—N/a	March 1, 2022
Paraguay	List	María Antonia Ida Masana García	Ambassador	Asunción	—N/a	April 1, 2024
Poland	List	Gloria Lisette Nalvarte Simoni de Isasi	Ambassador	Warsaw	Countries: Ukraine	July 12, 2024
Portugal	List	Carlos Manuel Gil De Montes Molinari	Ambassador	Lisbon	—N/a	November 15, 2021
Qatar	List	Gonzalo Voto Bernales García	Ambassador	Doha	—N/a	September 1, 2024
Romania	List	Félix Ricardo Américo Antonio Denegri Boza	Ambassador	Bucharest	Countries: Croatia; Republic of Moldova; North Macedonia	July 15, 2023
Russia	List	Juan Genaro Del Campo Rodríguez	Ambassador	Moscow	Countries: Armenia; Belarus; Kazakhstan	August 1, 2020
Saudi Arabia	List	Ricardo Silva Santisteban Benza	Ambassador	Riyadh	Countries: Bahrain; Oman	November 1, 2024
Singapore	List	Francisco Tenya Hasegawa	Ambassador	Singapore	—N/a	May 20, 2018
South Africa	List	José Javier Augusto Shaw	Ambassador	Pretoria	Countries: Angola; Mozambique; Namibia; Zambia; Zimbabwe	June 1, 2024
South Korea	List	Paul Fernando Duclos Parodi	Ambassador	Seoul	—N/a	March 1, 2023
Spain	List	Luis Carlos Antonio Iberico Núñez	Ambassador	Madrid	Countries: Andorra	August 1, 2024
Sweden	List	Miguel Ángel Samanez Bendezú	Ambassador	Stockholm	Countries: Denmark	May 1, 2023
Switzerland	List	Luis Alberto Castro Joo	Ambassador	Bern	Countries: Liechtenstein	January 1, 2022
Thailand	List	Cecilia Zunilda Galarreta Bazán	Ambassador	Bangkok	Countries: Philippines	June 1, 2022
Trinidad and Tobago	List	Claudia Giuliana Betalleluz Otiura	Ambassador	Port of Spain	Countries: Guyana; Saint Vincent and the Grenadines; Saint Lucia; Guyana; CARICOM	June 15, 2024
Turkey	List	César Augusto De las Casas Díaz	Ambassador	Ankara	Countries: Azerbaijan; Georgia; Iran	February 1, 2023
United Kingdom	List	Ignacio Higueras Hare	Ambassador	London	—N/a	May 1, 2024
United Arab Emirates		Alberto Alejandro Farje Orna	Ambassador	Abu Dhabi		August 15, 2024
United States	List	Alfredo Santiago Carlos Ferrero Diez Canseco	Ambassador	Washington, D.C.	—N/a	February 26, 2024
Uruguay	List	Elizabeth Alice González Porturas	Ambassador	Montevideo	—N/a	March 15, 2023
Venezuela	List	Víctor Ricardo López Luque	Chargé d'affaires (a.i.)	Caracas	—N/a	
Vietnam	List	Patricia Yolanda Ráez Portocarrero	Ambassador	Hanoi	Countries: Laos	May 1, 2024

== Other chiefs of mission ==
Some diplomatic posts, such as the consuls-general in Dubai, function as the foremost representatives of Peru to certain countries, or, alternatively, as de facto ambassadors.

Host country	List	Head of mission	Position	Website	Concurrency	Term end
Taiwan	List	Juan Luis Kuyeng Ruiz	Commercial Economic Counselor	Taipei	—N/a	March 16, 2023

== Political ambassadors ==
The 2003 Law of the Diplomatic Service of the Republic (№ 28091) establishes that only in exceptional cases and with the approval vote of the Council of Ministers, the President of the Republic can appoint as Ambassador of Peru or representative before international organizations, without belonging to the Diplomatic Service, to those who meet the following requirements:

- Peruvian nationality by birth
- Notable ability and knowledge
- Provide or have provided outstanding services to the Nation
- Observe correct public and private conduct
- Lack of a criminal record

=== List ===
- Óscar R. Benavides (Italy, Spain, Argentina)
- Carlos Ledgard Neuhaus (Argentina)
- Luis A. Flores (Italy, Paraguay)
- Emilio Romero Padilla (Ecuador, Uruguay)
- José Quesada Larrea (Argentina)
- Manuel Seoane Corrales (Netherlands, Chile)
- Héctor Boza (France)

Military government (1962–1963)

- Armando Revoredo Iglesias (Chile)
- Julio Vargas-Prada (Uruguay)

1st Belaúnde government (1963–1968)

- Edgardo Seoane (Mexico)
- Óscar Trelles Montes (France)
- César Miró (UNESCO)
- Francisco Miró Quesada (France)
- Humberto Valdivia Ávalos (FAO)
- Nicolás Lindley López (Spain)
- Julio Vargas-Prada (Dominican Republic)

Military government (1968–1980)

- Mario Alzamora Valdéz (France)
- José Arce y Larco (United States)
- Luis Felipe de Las Casas (Venezuela)
- Óscar Trelles Montes (France)
- Guillermo Arbulú Galliani (Chile)
- Adelmo Rissi Ferreyros (El Salvador)
- Julio Vargas-Prada (Colombia)

2nd Belaúnde government (1980–1985)

- Guillermo Hoyos Osores (Argentina)
- Fernando Schwalb (United States)
- José Luis Bustamante y Rivera (Chile)
- Miguel Dammert Muelle (Austria)
- Miguel Mujica Gallo (Spain)
- Juan Vargas Quintanilla (East Germany)
- Luis Felipe Alarco Larrabure (UNESCO)
- Celso Pastor de la Torre (United States)
- Andrés Aramburú Menchaca (United Kingdom)
- José María de la Jara y Ureta (Italy)
- Augusto Dammert León (Nicaragua)
- Javier Arias Stella (United Nations)
- Federico Ruiz de Castilla (El Salvador)

1st García government (1985–1990)

- Jorge Raygada Cauvi (OAS, Venezuela)
- Alfonso Grados Bertorini (Argentina)
- Javier Pulgar Vidal (Colombia)
- Enrique Rivero Vélez (Costa Rica)
- César Atala Nazzal (United States)
- Hugo Otero Lanzarotti (France)
- Carlos Raffo Dasso (United Kingdom)
- Percy Murillo Garaycochea (Guatemala)
- Javier Ortiz de Zevallos (Panama)
- Luis Gonzales Posada (OAS)
- Julio Ramón Ribeyro (UNESCO)
- Nicanor Mujica Álvarez-Calderón (France)
- Ricardo Temoche Benítes (Guatemala)
- Wilfredo Huayta Núñez (Mexico)
- Manuel Checa Solari (Portugal)
- Mario Castro Arenas (Panama)
- Rogelio León Seminario (Switzerland)
- Edmundo Haya de la Torre (OAS)
- Alejandro Saco Miro Quesada (Colombia)

Fujimori government (1990–2000)

- Víctor Aritomi Shinto (Japan)
- Roberto MacLean Ugarteche (United States)
- Alberto Cazorla Talleri (Mexico)
- Máximo Manuel Vara Ochoa (Cuba)
- Luis Silva Santisteban García Seminario (Germany)
- Alberto Ulloa Elías (Argentina)
- Guillermo del Solar Rojas (Belgium)
- Alberto Varillas Montenegro (Costa Rica)
- Adolfo Alvarado Fournier (Uruguay)
- Arturo García y García (Ecuador)
- Jorge Torres Aciego (Israel)
- Alberto Cazorlla Talleri (Mexico)
- Alfredo Ross Antezana (Panama)
- Eduardo Raygada Morzán (Venezuela)
- Enrique Rossl Link (Italy)
- Ana María Deustua Caravedo (Italy)
- Beatriz Ramacciotti de Cubas (OAS)
- Augusto Antonioli Vásquez (Holy See)
- Gonzalo Bedoya Delboy (Uruguay)
- Juan Castilla Meza (Cuba, Venezuela)
- Guillermo Fernández-Cornejo Cortéz (Panama)
- Fernando Vega Santa Gadea (Spain)
- Víctor Malca Villanueva (Mexico)
- Alfredo Arnaiz Ambrosiani (Nicaragua)
- Jaime Sobero Taira (Cuba)
- María Luisa Federici Soto (France)
- Carlos Hermoza Moya (Honduras)
- Tomás Castillo Meza (Morocco)
- Víctor Yamamoto Miyakawa (Honduras)
- Francisco Tudela (United Nations)
- Luis Solari Tudela (Holy See)
- Alfredo Ramos Suero (Colombia)
- Julio Salazar Monroe (Venezuela)

Toledo government (2001–2006)

- Javier Pérez de Cuéllar (France)
- Eduardo Ferrero Costa (United States)
- Alfredo Novoa Peña (Germany)
- Luis Marchand Stens (Ecuador)
- Alfredo Arosemena Ferreyros (Mexico)
- Carlos Urrutia Boloña (Venezuela)
- Mario Pareja Lecaros (Honduras)
- Luis Chang Reyes (China)
- Fernando Olivera Vega (Spain)
- Roberto Dañino Zapata (United States)
- José Pablo Morán Val (Holy See)
- Martín Belaunde Moreyra (Argentina)
- Alberto Borea Odría (OAS)
- Francisco Miró-Quesada Rada (France)
- Luis Solari Tudela (United Kingdom)
- Juan Velit Granda (Poland)
- Fernando de la Flor Arbulú (OAS)
- Oswaldo de Rivero Barreto (United Nations)

2nd García government (2006–2011)

- Felipe Ortiz de Zevallos (United States)
- José Barba Caballero (Panama)
- Hugo Otero Lanzarotti (Chile)
- Jesús Jay Wu Luy (China)
- Carlos Roca Cáceres (Italy)
- Federico Kauffmann Doig (Germany)
- Luis Valdivieso Montano (United States)
- Luis Alvarado Contreras (Mexico)
- María Zavala Valladares (OAS, Jamaica)
- Cecilia Bákula Budge (UNESCO)
- Jaime Cáceres Sayán (Spain)
- Rafael Rey Rey (Italy)
- Ricardo Jorge Ghibellini Harten (Brazil)
- Judith De La Mata Fernández (Argentina)
- Moisés Tambini del Valle (Costa Rica)

Humala government (2011–2016)

- Nicolás Lynch Gamero (Argentina)
- Cristina Velita Arroyo de Laboureix (France)
- Víctor Mayorga Miranda (Cuba)
- Allan Wagner Tizón (Netherlands)
- Alfredo Arosemena Ferreyros (Italy)
- Walter Jorge Albán Peralta (OAS)
- Aída García-Naranjo (Uruguay)
- Rudecindo Vega Carreazo (Nicaragua)
- Francisco Eguiguren Praeli (Spain)
- Guillermo Gonzáles Arica (Honduras)
- Rafael Roncagliolo Orbegoso (Spain)
- Luis Miguel Castilla Rubio (United States)

Kuczynski government (2016–2018)

- Hugo Otero Lanzarotti (Ecuador)
- José Antonio García Belaúnde (Spain)
- Susana de la Puente Wiese (United Kingdom)
- Carmen McEvoy (Ireland)
- Luis Iberico Núñez (Italy)
- Álvaro de Soto y Polar (France)
- Martín Vizcarra Cornejo (Canada)

Vizcarra government (2018–2020)

- Ricardo Luna Mendoza (UNESCO)
- José Antonio Raymundo Bellina Acevedo (Sweden, Denmark)
- Vicente Zeballos Salinas (OAS)

Castillo government (2021–2022)

- Harold Forsyth (OAS)
- Oswaldo de Rivero (United States)
- Manuel Rodríguez Cuadros (United Nations)
- Carina Palacios (Bolivia)

Boluarte government (2022–2026)

- Luis Chuquihuara Chil (Holy See)
- Alfredo Santiago Carlos Ferrero Diez-Canseco (United States)
- Carlos Guillermo Hakansson Nieto (Costa Rica)
- José Luis Sardón de Taboada (OAS)
- Luis Iberico Núñez (Spain)
- Enrique Armando Román Morey (UN)
- Javier Manuel Paulinich Velarde (India)
- Ernesto Moisés Pinto Bazurco Rittler (Finland)

== Ambassadors killed in office ==
Name	Ambassador to	Place	Country	Date of death	Killed by
Fernando Rodríguez Oliva	Jamaica	Kingston, Jamaica	Jamaica	June 14, 1976	Murdered outside of his residence in Kingston.

== Former diplomatic posts ==
Host country	List	Final resident head of mission	Position	Concurrency	Term end	End cause
Austria–Hungary	List	Alejandro Von der Heyde	Ambassador	—N/a	1917	World War I
Azerbaijan	List	María Milagros Castañón Seoane	Ambassador	Countries: Georgia	December 26, 2019	Unclear, originally described as a temporary measure.
Bulgaria	List	Héctor Matallana Martinez	Chargé d'affaires (a.i.)	—N/a	2003	Embassy closed due to austerity measures.
Central America	List	Juan Mendoza y Almenara	Ambassador	—N/a	1943	The post, an umbrella term for different countries in the region, gradually lost relevance as ambassadors were appointed to each country.
China (Taiwan)	List	Jorge Pérez Garreaud	Chargé d'affaires	Countries: Japan	November 3, 1971	Relations severed by Taiwan: the Peruvian diplomat was personally requested to leave the country after Peru established relations with the People's Republic of China.
Czechoslovakia	List	Adolfo Alvarado Fournier	Ambassador	—N/a	January 1, 1993	Dissolution of Czechoslovakia; relations continued with the Czech Republic and Slovakia.
Denmark	List	Liliana Cino de Silva	Ambassador	—N/a	2003	Embassy closed due to austerity measures.
East Germany	List	Jaime Cacho-Sousa C.	Ambassador	—N/a	1990	German reunification
Jamaica	List	Luis Wilfredo Sandiga Cabrera	Ambassador	—N/a	December 31, 2006	Embassy closed due to austerity measures.
Kenya	List	Jesús F. Isasi Cayo	Ambassador	—N/a	1990	Embassy closed.
Philippines	List	Jorge Chávez Soto	Ambassador	Countries: Indonesia; Malaysia	2003	Embassy closed due to austerity measures.
Soviet Union	List	Armando Lecaros de Cossío	Ambassador	—N/a	1991	Dissolution of the Soviet Union; relations continued with successor states.
Yugoslavia	List	Julio Walter Negreiros Portella	Ambassador	Countries: Albania	December 31, 2006	Dissolution of Yugoslavia; relations continued with successor states.

== See also ==
- List of diplomatic missions of Peru
- List of diplomatic missions in Peru
