= List of ambassadors of Peru to Hungary =

Ambassador of Peru to Hungary
- Great Seal of Peru
- Ministry of Foreign Affairs
- Appointer: The president of Peru
- Website: Embassy of Peru in Hungary

The extraordinary and plenipotentiary ambassador of Peru to Hungary is the official representative of the Republic of Peru to Hungary. The ambassador to Hungary is also accredited to Serbia (since 2018) and Bosnia and Herzegovina.

Both countries established relations in the 19th century. In 1851, Austria–Hungary recognized the independence of Peru, and both countries subsequently established relations. As a result of World War I, Peru severed relations with both Germany and Austria–Hungary in 1917, reestablishing them in 1920.

After the 1968 Peruvian coup d'état and the establishment of Juan Velasco Alvarado's Revolutionary Government, relations were renewed in April 1969 with the Hungarian People's Republic as the new Peruvian government pursued closer relations with the Soviet bloc.

The Peruvian embassy in Budapest closed in January 2007 and reopened in 2017. Today, ethnic Hungarians in Latin America reside in Argentina and Peru for the most part.

== List of representatives ==
=== Austria–Hungary (19th century–1917) ===
Name	Portrait	Term begin	Term end	President	Notes
Carlos Larrabure y Correa		1909	1909	Augusto B. Leguía	As Envoy Extraordinary and Minister Plenipotentiary.
Andrés Avelino Cáceres		1911	April 14, 1914	Augusto B. Leguía	As Envoy Extraordinary and Minister Plenipotentiary.
Alejandro Von der Heyde		April 15, 1914	1917	Augusto B. Leguía	As Envoy Extraordinary and Minister Plenipotentiary (ad honorem).

=== Hungary (1968–2026) ===
Name	Portrait	Term begin	Term end	President	Notes
Max de la Fuente Prem		1996	August 3, 2001	Alberto Fujimori	As ambassador.
Domingo Da Fieno Gandolfo		2001	2002	Alejandro Toledo	As ambassador.
Guillermo Russo Checa		July 1, 2002	2005	Alejandro Toledo	As ambassador; concurrent to Slovakia, Croatia and Slovenia from 2003.
Jean Gilbert Denis Chauny de Porturas Hoyle		2005	January 15, 2007	Alejandro Toledo	As ambassador; concurrent to Bosnia-Herzegovina and Croatia.
Antonio Javier Alejandro García Revilla		March 14, 2009	June 28, 2013	Alan García	As ambassador from Austria; concurrent to Hungary from 2009.
Raúl Chuquihuara Chil		2016	August 12, 2016	Ollanta Humala	As Ambassador in Austria, also accredited to Slovenia.
Juan Fernando Javier Rojas Samanez		2017	May 30, 2018	Pedro Pablo Kuczynski	As ambassador; concurrent from Austria.
Raúl Salazar Cosio		May 9, 2018	2026	Martín Vizcarra	As ambassador; accredited to Bosnia and Herzegovina from February 25, 2021.

== See also ==
- List of ambassadors of Hungary to Peru
- List of ambassadors of Peru to Austria
- List of ambassadors of Peru to the Soviet Union
- List of ambassadors of Peru to Czechoslovakia
- List of ambassadors of Peru to East Germany
- List of ambassadors of Peru to Yugoslavia
- List of ambassadors of Peru to Bulgaria
- List of ambassadors of Peru to Albania
- List of ambassadors of Peru to Romania
- List of ambassadors of Peru to Poland
