= List of ambassadors of Peru to Poland =

Ambassador of Peru to the Republic of Poland
- Great Seal of Peru
- Incumbent; Hubert Wieland Conroy since July 12, 2022
- Ministry of Foreign Affairs; Starościńska 1, Warsaw
- Appointer: The president of Peru
- Inaugural holder: Óscar Barrós
- Formation: October 27, 1928
- Website: Embassy of Peru in Poland

The extraordinary and plenipotentiary ambassador of Peru to the Republic of Poland is the official representative of the Republic of Peru to the Republic of Poland. The ambassador to Poland is also accredited to Ukraine. (Note: Formerly accredited from Russia and from an embassy of its own in Kyiv until its closure.)

Both countries officially established relations in 1923. Although originally of a stable nature, the invasion of Poland and the outbreak of World War II led to the withdrawal and reestablishment of Peruvian recognition of different entities representing a Polish government until 1967, when Peru officially reestablished relations, now with the Polish People's Republic.

Peruvian president Alan García visited Poland some time before the 1990 Polish presidential election, in September 1989. Since the socialist government's collapse, both nations have continued their relations, with both countries signing treaties and with more government visits between both states taking place.

== List of representatives ==
=== Republic of Poland (1923–1945) ===
Name	Portrait	Term begin	Term end	President	Notes
Felipe Espantoso		September 6, 1923		Augusto B. Leguía	Ad Honorem Chargé d'Affairs
Óscar Barrós		October 27, 1928	1935	Augusto B. Leguía	First envoy extraordinary and minister plenipotentiary to Poland
Ventura García Calderón Rey		July 1935	1939	Óscar R. Benavides	Accredited to Poland from Belgium.
José Gambetta		1939	1939	Manuel Prado Ugarteche	Chargé d'Affaires. His duties were interrupted by the invasion of Poland, which led to the lack of a Peruvian representative to Poland until 1943.
Edwin Letts Sánchez		March 22, 1943	July 1945	Manuel Prado Ugarteche	As chargé d’affaires en pied to the Polish government-in-exile, also accredited to the wartime governments of the Netherlands, Czechoslovakia, Norway, Yugoslavia and as chargé d’affaires a.i. to the Belgian government in exile in London. Letts' duties lasted until the Peruvian government withdrew its recognition of the Polish government-in-exile in July 1945. On November of the same year, Peru recognized the Provisional Government of National Unity without establishing relations.

=== Polish People's Republic (1967–1989) ===
Name	Portrait	Term begin	Term end	President	Notes
Juan Garland Combe		July 14, 1969	July 16, 1969	Juan Velasco Alvarado	As chargé d’affaires a.i. in Warsaw
Javier Pérez de Cuéllar		July 16, 1969	1971	Juan Velasco Alvarado	Ambassador; accredited from Moscow.
José de la Puente Radbill		September 16, 1971	1973	Juan Velasco Alvarado	Ambassador; accredited from Moscow.
Raúl María Pereira Veintemilla		April 18, 1973	April 12, 1977	Juan Velasco Alvarado	Ambassador. He later served as ambassador to Bulgaria, being accredited to Albania.
Juan Garland Combe		March 12, 1977		Francisco Morales Bermúdez	
Igor Velázquez Rodríguez		1984	1985	Fernando Belaúnde	He later served as Ambassador to Czechoslovakia. The Peruvian Embassy was located in Felińskiego 25, Warsaw, at the time.
María Victoria Salazar Castellanos		1985	1990	Alan García	As Ambassador.

=== Republic of Poland (1989–present) ===
Name	Portrait	Term begin	Term end	President	Notes
Cord Dammert		1990	?	Alberto Fujimori	First ambassador to the new Republic of Poland.
Hugo de Zela		before 1999?	before 2002	Alberto Fujimori	Ambassador
Martin Yrigoyen Yrigoyen		before 2002?	after 2003?	Alejandro Toledo	Ambassador. In 2000 he was an ambassador to Greece.
Martha Isabel Chavarri Dupuy		2009	June 16, 2014	Alan García	Also accredited to Ukraine; previously served in Helsinki.
Alberto Salas Barahona		July 2015	July 13, 2021	Ollanta Humala	Ambassador, also accredited to Ukraine from December 4, 2015.
Hubert Wieland Conroy		July 12, 2021	Incumbent	Francisco Sagasti	Ambassador

== See also ==
- List of ambassadors of Ukraine to Peru
- List of ambassadors of Peru to the Soviet Union
- List of ambassadors of Peru to Czechoslovakia
- List of ambassadors of Peru to East Germany
- List of ambassadors of Peru to Yugoslavia
- List of ambassadors of Peru to Bulgaria
- List of ambassadors of Peru to Albania
- List of ambassadors of Peru to Hungary
- List of ambassadors of Peru to Romania
