= List of ambassadors of Peru to Germany =

Ambassador of Peru to the Federal Republic of Germany
- Great Seal of Peru
- Ministry of Foreign Affairs; Mohrenstraße 42, Berlin
- Appointer: The president of Peru
- Inaugural holder: Pedro José Calderón
- Formation: January 13, 1871 (as Plenipotentiary Minister)
- Website: Embassy of Peru in Germany

The extraordinary and plenipotentiary ambassador of Peru to the Federal Republic of Germany is the official representative of the Republic of Peru to the Federal Republic of Germany.

Peru officially established bilateral relations with modern Germany's predecessors in 1828, among them the North German Confederation in 1870 (which was succeeded by the German Empire) and have since maintained diplomatic relations with two exceptions where Peru has severed its relations: on October 5, 1917, as a result of World War I (later reestablished with the Weimar Republic on May 28, 1920) and January 24, 1942, as a result of the German Reich's declaration of war against the United States during World War II.

After the Second World War, relations were reestablished on January 31, 1951, with the Federal Republic of Germany. After the 1968 Peruvian coup d'état and the establishment of Juan Velasco Alvarado's Revolutionary Government, relations with the German Democratic Republic were also established on December 28, 1972.

== List of representatives ==
=== German Reich (1871–1917; 1920–1942) ===
Name	Portrait	Term begin	Term end	President	Notes
Pedro José Calderón		January 13, 1871	August 12, 1872	José Balta	
José Antonio de Lavalle		October 7, 1873	August 12, 1875	Manuel Pardo	Lavalle's wife, Mariana Pardo y Lavalle, died on March 31, 1875, which led to Lavalle retiring from his duties in the Peruvian Legation of Saint Petersburg (also accredited to Germany) and leaving for Peru the next year.
Luciano Benjamín Cisneros		May 2, 1882	?	Lizardo Montero	
Aníbal Villegas		October 14, 1891	December 28, 1899	Remigio Morales Bermúdez	
Toribio Sanz		May 10, 1901	October 29, 1903	Eduardo López de Romaña	
Andrés Avelino Cáceres		May 8, 1911	August 17, 1914	Augusto B. Leguía	Also accredited to Austria-Hungary.
Víctor Andrés Belaúnde		June 9, 1914	August 17, 1914	Óscar R. Benavides	The Legations of Austria-Hungary and Germany were separated on April 15, 1914.
Alejandro von der Heyde		November 17, 1914	October 6, 1917	Óscar R. Benavides	Last representative of Peru to Germany and Austria-Hungary before the rupture of diplomatic relations due to World War I.
Represented by Spain (Diplomatic relations severed on October 5, 1917; resumed on May 28, 1920)
José Varela y Orbegoso		May 28, 1920	?	Augusto B. Leguía	
Agustín Ganoza y Cavero		1921	1922	Augusto B. Leguía	
Celso Gil Pastor		1929	1931	Augusto B. Leguía	
Enrique Gildemeister Möller		August 1931	1937	Luis Miguel Sánchez Cerro	
Enrique Gildemeister Möller		March 4, 1938	1942	Óscar R. Benavides	The Peruvian Legation was closed in February 1942, with its last occupant leaving in June of the same year and its duties being transferred to the Peruvian Embassy in Switzerland.
Represented by Switzerland (Diplomatic relations severed in January 1942; resumed in 1951)

=== German Democratic Republic (1972–1990) ===
Name	Portrait	Term begin	Term end	President	Notes
José Alvarado Sánchez		1972	?	Juan Velasco Alvarado	As Ambassador.
Ricardo Walter Stubbs Vega		b. March 28 1979	May 1988	Francisco Morales Bermudez	As Ambassador or Ambassador Extraordinary and Plenipotentiary. During his tenure, the Peruvian Embassy (also accredited to Bolivia after 1973) was located on Otto-Grotewohl-Straße 5, 108 Berlin-Mitte (in 1984), later being located on Schadowstrasse 6/IV (in 1988). He was once recalled in 1986 due to an arms smuggling incident.
Jaime Cacho-Sousa C.		May 28, 1988	?	Alan García	As Ambassador Extraordinary and Plenipotentiary In 1984, he was Ambassador to Czechoslovakia.

=== Federal Republic of Germany (1951–2026) ===
Name	Portrait	Term begin	Term end	President	Notes
Luis Felipe Lanata Coudy		June 14, 1951	1953	Manuel A. Odría	
Gonzalo Narciso de Arámburu y Rosas		August 21, 1953	1955	Manuel A. Odría	
Luis Felipe Lanata Coudy		1955	1958	Manuel A. Odría	
Jorge Fernández Stoll-Nottman		July 1958	1960	Manuel Prado y Ugarteche	
Luis Felipe Lanata Coudy		1961	1961	Manuel Prado y Ugarteche	
Juan Ignacio Elguera MacParlin		June 1961	1963	Manuel Prado y Ugarteche	
Walter Peñaloza		1963	1969	Fernando Belaúnde Terry	
Alberto Wagner de Reyna		1969	1972	Juan Velasco Alvarado	
Hubert Wieland Alzamora		March 7, 1972	1976	Juan Velasco Alvarado	
Joaquín Heredia Cabieses		1976	1978	Francisco Morales Bermúdez	
Augusto Enrique Morelli Pando		1979	1982	Francisco Morales Bermúdez	
Enrique Fernández de Paredes Cabello		1982	1988	Fernando Belaúnde Terry	
Gabriel Ignacio García Pike		1988	1991	Alan García	Last Peruvian ambassador of a divided Germany.
Luis Silva-Santisteban García-Seminario		1992	2000	Alberto Fujimori	
Alfredo Novoa-Pena		2001	2003	Alejandro Toledo	
Hubert Wieland Conroy		2002	2003	Alejandro Toledo	
Carlos Alberto Higueras Ramos		March 10, 2004	September 28, 2006	Alejandro Toledo	
Federico Kauffmann Doig		December 1, 2006	January 21, 2009	Alan García	
José Luis Pérez Sánchez-Cerro		March 28, 2009	2011	Alan García	
Julio Muñoz Deacon		May 19, 2011	2012	Ollanta Humala	
José Antonio Meier Espinosa		March 6, 2012	?	Ollanta Humala	
Elmer Schialer Salcedo		February 1, 2017	December 23, 2022	Martín Vizcarra	
Augusto David Teodoro Arzubiaga Scheuch		December 25, 2022	October 10, 2025	Dina Boluarte	

== See also ==
- List of ambassadors of Germany to Peru
- List of ambassadors of Peru to Austria
- List of ambassadors of Peru to Hungary
- List of ambassadors of Peru to the Soviet Union
- List of ambassadors of Peru to Czechoslovakia
- List of ambassadors of Peru to Yugoslavia
- List of ambassadors of Peru to Bulgaria
- List of ambassadors of Peru to Albania
- List of ambassadors of Peru to Romania
- List of ambassadors of Peru to Poland
