= List of ambassadors of Peru to the Czech Republic =

Ambassador of Peru to the Czech Republic
- Great Seal of Peru
- Ministry of Foreign Affairs; Muchova 9, Prague
- Appointer: The president of Peru
- Inaugural holder: Igor Velásquez Rodríguez (to Czechoslovakia)
- Formation: 1969
- Website: Embassy of Peru in the Czech Republic

The extraordinary and plenipotentiary ambassador of Peru to the Czech Republic is the official representative of the Republic of Peru to the Czech Republic.

Peru first established relations with Czechoslovakia on July 11, 1922. In 1937, the diplomatic representation between both countries was raised to the level of Embassy, with the latter opening an embassy in Lima the same year.

After the German occupation of Czechoslovakia—now the Protectorate of Bohemia and Moravia—Peru ceased to recognize Czechoslovakia as a sovereign state. However, as World War II progressed, Peru maintained relations with the Czechoslovak government-in-exile, among others, now based in London.

After the war, both countries reestablished relations, which continued into the Czechoslovak Socialist Republic until October 4, 1957, when Peru, under Manuel A. Odría's government, broke relations with the state. After the 1968 Peruvian coup d'état and the establishment of Juan Velasco Alvarado's Revolutionary Government, relations were renewed in 1968 and raised to the level of embassy in 1969.

Relations again continued into the Czech and Slovak Federative Republic, and after the country ceased to exist in 1993, the Peruvian government recognized the Czech Republic and Slovakia as its successor states. As of 2023, Peru maintains an embassy in Prague, and the ambassador in Vienna is accredited to Slovakia.

== List of representatives ==
=== Czechoslovakia (1922–1993) ===
Name	Portrait	Term begin	Term end	President	Notes
Glicero Camino		July 11, 1922	1930	Augusto B. Leguía	As chargé d'affaires.
1930–1936: Vacant
Fernando Tola		1937	1937	Óscar R. Benavides	As ambassador.
José Gambetta		December 28, 1937	1938	Óscar R. Benavides	As chargé d'affaires.
Emilio del Solar		1938	1938	Óscar R. Benavides	As ambassador.
Represented by Germany (Czechoslovakia incorporated into Germany in 1938, diplomatic relations resumed in 1943)
Edwin Letts Sánchez		March 22, 1943	July 1945	Manuel Prado Ugarteche	As chargé d’affaires en pied to the Czechoslovak government-in-exile, also accredited to the wartime governments of the Netherlands, Poland, Norway, Yugoslavia and as chargé d’affaires a.i. to the Belgian government in exile in London.
Edwin Letts Sánchez		November 1, 1944		Manuel Prado Ugarteche	As ambassador.
Gonzalo Ulloa		April 5, 1946	?	José Luis Bustamante y Rivero	As ambassador.
Igor Velasquez Rodriguez		July 16, 1969	1971	Juan Velasco Alvarado	Ambassador
Enrique Fernández de Paredes Cabello		1971	1975?	Juan Velasco Alvarado	As Ambassador.
Augusto Arzubiaga Rospigliosi		1975	1981?	Juan Velasco Alvarado	As Ambassador.
Carmela Aguilar Ayanz		1984	after 1987	Fernando Belaúnde	As first female ambassador of Peru.
Adolfo Alvarado Fournier		December 16, 1992	July 4, 1995	Alberto Fujimori	Divisional general of the Peruvian Army. Ambassador to the Czech and Slovak Federative Republic, and thus, last representative to Czechoslovakia.

=== Czech Republic (1993–2026) ===
Name	Portrait	Term begin	Term end	President	Notes
Adolfo Alvarado Fournier		December 16, 1992	July 4, 1995	Alberto Fujimori	First Ambassador to the Czech Republic.
Gonzalo Bedoya		before April 19, 1996	after April 19, 1996	Alberto Fujimori	As Ambassador.
Efraín Wilfredo Salas Barahona		2004	December 26, 2009	Alejandro Toledo	As Ambassador.
María Susana Landaveri Porturas		November 1, 2010	August 26, 2015	Alan García	As Ambassador.
Liliana de Olarte		September 3, 2015	April 21, 2021	Ollanta Humala	As Ambassador.
Néstor Francisco Popolizio Bardales		December 15, 2021	2026	Pedro Castillo	As ambassador.

== See also ==
- List of ambassadors of the Czech Republic to Peru
- List of ambassadors of Peru to the Soviet Union
- List of ambassadors of Peru to East Germany
- List of ambassadors of Peru to Yugoslavia
- List of ambassadors of Peru to Bulgaria
- List of ambassadors of Peru to Albania
- List of ambassadors of Peru to Hungary
- List of ambassadors of Peru to Romania
- List of ambassadors of Peru to Poland
