= List of ambassadors of Peru to Turkey =

Ambassador of Peru to the Republic of Turkey
- Great Seal of Peru
- Ministry of Foreign Affairs
- Appointer: The president of Peru
- Website: Embassy of Peru in Turkey

The extraordinary and plenipotentiary ambassador of Peru to the Republic of Turkey is the official representative of the Republic of Peru to the Republic of Turkey.

Relations between both states date back to the Ottoman Empire, with the most recent establishment of relations being in 1952. In 2010, a Peruvian embassy was opened in Ankara, and a Turkish embassy was opened in Lima.

The ambassador to Turkey is also accredited to Georgia and Azerbaijan since 2011. Peru opened an embassy on August 2, 2017 (concurrent with Georgia), which closed in 2020 (reaccrediting the ambassador in Ankara to said countries). (Note: The embassy in Baku (located at Demirchi Tower F. 24, Khojaly 37), was serviced by only one ambassador: María Milagros Castañón Seoane (December 28, 2018 – December 26, 2019)) In Georgia, an honorary consulate was opened on August 23, 2018. (Note: The consul has employed two honorary consuls as of 2023: Mamuka Khazaradze (September 7, 2018 – August 5, 2019); Mikheil Chkuaseli (June 17, 2020 – present))

== List of representatives ==
Name	Portrait	Term begin	Term end	President	Notes
Fabio Arciniega		November 22, 1900	after 1902?	Eduardo López de Romaña	As Consul-general in Constantinople.
Jorge Pablo Fernandini Malpartida		1972	1976	Juan Velasco Alvarado	Accredited from Vienna.
Gilbert Chauny de Porturas-Hoyle		1995	2000	Alberto Fujimori	Accredited from Vienna.
Harold Forsyth		2005	2006	Alejandro Toledo	Accredited from Rome.
Daúl Matute Mejía		N/A	N/A	Alejandro Toledo	Matute was named as the ambassador to Turkey, but resigned before taking office.
Jorge Abarca del Carpio		August 1, 2010	November 1, 2015	Alan García	First resident ambassador in Ankara, and first ambassador to Georgia from August 1, 2014.
Luis Manuel Santiago Marcovich Monasi		2015	2018	Ollanta Humala	Ambassador; concurrent with Georgia and Azerbaijan.
Luis Alberto Campana Boluarte		2018	October 13, 2021	Martín Vizcarra	As ambassador.
César Augusto De las Casas Díaz		June 21, 2023	2026	Dina Boluarte	As ambassador. He presented his credentials on June 21, 2023. Also accredited to Georgia.

== See also ==
- List of ambassadors of Turkey to Peru
- List of ambassadors of Peru to Greece
- List of ambassadors of Peru to Russia
- List of ambassadors of Georgia to Peru
