= List of ambassadors of Peru to Romania =

Ambassador of Peru to Romania
- Great Seal of Peru
- Ministry of Foreign Affairs
- Style: His or Her Excellency
- Appointer: The president of Peru
- Formation
- Website: Embassy of Peru in Romania

The extraordinary and plenipotentiary ambassador of Peru to Romania is the official representative of the Republic of Peru to Romania.

As of 2023, the ambassador to Romania is also accredited to Croatia, Moldova, Montenegro and North Macedonia, having also been accredited to Serbia until December 29, 2018, when the Ambassador to Hungary became accredited instead.

Both countries established relations on October 10, 1939. Peru severed its relations as a result of World War II, but reestablished them at en embassy level with the Socialist Republic of Romania on November 9, 1968, after the 1968 Peruvian coup d'état and the establishment of Juan Velasco Alvarado's Revolutionary Government. Under Velasco Alvarado's tenure, Peru pursued closer relations with Romania and the rest of the Soviet bloc.

Peru has an embassy in Bucharest. It closed in 1991, but reopened on August 4, 1994. The ambassador to Romania was accredited to Serbia until 2018.

== List of representatives ==
Name	Portrait	Term begin	Term end	President	Notes
Róger Eloy Loayza Saavedra		before 1983	after 1984	Fernando Belaúnde	As Ambassador.
Luis Guillermo Gerdau O'Connor		before 1989	?	Alan García	As Ambassador.
José Augusto Tenorio Benavides		1997	2003	Alberto Fujimori	As Ambassador. His tenure was almost terminated in 1999 and 2002. He was finally terminated in 2003.
Elard Alberto Escala Sánchez-Barreto		2004	2009	Alejandro Toledo	As Ambassador.
Ernesto Pinto Bazurco Rittler		October 1, 2009	August 28, 2011	Alan García	As Ambassador; accredited to Bosnia and Herzegovina and North Macedonia.
José Antonio Arróspide del Busto		January 15, 2012	January 18, 2017	Ollanta Humala	As Ambassador; accredited to Serbia, North Macedonia, Montenegro and Bosnia and Herzegovina.
María Eugenia Echeverría		December 18, 2017	December 16, 2022	Pedro Pablo Kuczynski	As Ambassador; accredited to Moldova, North Macedonia, Montenegro, Croatia, and Bosnia and Herzegovina.
Gustavo Antonio Otero Zapata		September 7, 2022	2026	Pedro Castillo	As Ambassador.

== See also ==
- List of ambassadors of Romania to Peru
- List of ambassadors of Peru to the Soviet Union
- List of ambassadors of Peru to Czechoslovakia
- List of ambassadors of Peru to East Germany
- List of ambassadors of Peru to Yugoslavia
- List of ambassadors of Peru to Bulgaria
- List of ambassadors of Peru to Albania
- List of ambassadors of Peru to Hungary
- List of ambassadors of Peru to Poland
