= List of ambassadors of Peru to Russia =

Ambassador of Peru to the Russian Federation
- Great Seal of Peru
- Ministry of Foreign Affairs; Pereulok Obukha 6, Apt. 1, Moscow
- Appointer: The president of Peru
- Inaugural holder: José Antonio de Lavalle
- Formation: March 18, 1874
- Website: Embassy of Peru in Russia

The extraordinary and plenipotentiary ambassador of Peru to the Russian Federation is the official representative of the Republic of Peru to the Russian Federation.

Diplomatic relations between Peru and Russia date back to the 19th century. Emperor Alexander II sent a letter, dated 29 October 1862, to Miguel de San Román, president of Peru, congratulating him on his election and expressing his desire to maintain friendly relations between the Russian Empire and Peru. The two countries signed their first official document, a Trade and Navigation Agreement in 1874, and by 1909 Peru had six consular missions in the Russian Empire: in Saint Petersburg, Moscow, Riga, Warsaw, Odesa and Kherson.

With the execution of the Romanov family and the downfall of the Russian Republic as a result of the Russian Civil War, both countries ceased to have any diplomatic relations from 1918 until the second half of the 20th century.

Relations at the embassy level between the Soviet Union and Peru were established on 1 February 1969. Relations were strengthened after the 1970 Ancash earthquake, with the Soviet Union sending helicopters and medical aid. With the dissolution of the Soviet Union in 1991, Peru recognised the Russian Federation as its successor state on 26 December 1991.

== List of representatives ==
Name	Portrait	Term begin	Term end	President	Notes
José Antonio de Lavalle		March 18, 1874	1876	Manuel Pardo	Lavalle's wife, Mariana Pardo y Lavalle, died on March 31, 1875, which led to Lavalle retiring from his duties in the Peruvian Legation of Saint Petersburg and leaving for Peru the next year. After his departure, relations between both states continued at a diminished level.
1969: Diplomatic relations between Peru and the Soviet Union formally established
Javier Pérez de Cuéllar		1969	1971	Juan Velasco Alvarado	Despite his appointment, Pérez de Cuéllar was opposed to the communist ideology of the Soviet Union. He would later serve as Secretary-General of the United Nations.
José de la Puente Radbill		1971	1973	Juan Velasco Alvarado	
Juan José Calle y Calle		1974	1980	Juan Velasco Alvarado	
Hubert Wieland Alzamora		1980	November 30, 1981	Fernando Belaúnde	
René Hooper López		February 22, 1982	?	Fernando Belaúnde	
Róger Eloy Loayza Saavedra		July 9, 1986	1991	Alan García	Previously the ambassador to neighbouring Romania.
1991: Dissolution of the Soviet Union; relations continued between Peru and Russia
Armando Lecaros de Cossío		October 1990 (USSR); December 1991 (Russia)	December 1991 (USSR); 1995 (Russia)	Alberto Fujimori	Ambassador to the Soviet Union before, during and after its collapse. As such, he was also the first Ambassador to the Russian Federation, being accredited to Ukraine from 1993 until July 1995.
Pablo Hugo Portugal Rodríguez		November 9, 2000	2003?	Alejandro Toledo	
Juan Humberto Umeres Álvarez		October 5, 2004	2012	Alejandro Toledo	
Gustavo Antonio Otero Zapata		March 15, 2012	June 16, 2014	Ollanta Humala	Concurrent to Belarus from July 5, 2012.
Juan Humberto Umeres Álvarez		November 19, 2014	March 30, 2016	Ollanta Humala	Also concurrent to Armenia, Belarus and Kazakhstan.
Carlos Manuel Alfredo Velasco Mendiola		May 1, 2016	August 26, 2016	Ollanta Humala	Unlike his predecessors and successors, he was only appointed to Russia.
Luis Benjamin Chimoy Arteaga		September 24, 2016	January 20, 2020	Martín Vizcarra	Concurrent Ambassador of Armenia, Belarus (credentials presented on October 1, 2017) and Kazakhstan.
Juan Genaro Del Campo Rodríguez		September 1, 2021	December 7, 2022	Pedro Castillo	Concurrent Ambassador of Armenia and Kazakhstan from 2 September.

== See also ==
- List of ambassadors of Russia to Peru
- List of ambassadors of Peru to Czechoslovakia
- List of ambassadors of Peru to East Germany
- List of ambassadors of Peru to Yugoslavia
- List of ambassadors of Peru to Bulgaria
- List of ambassadors of Peru to Albania
- List of ambassadors of Peru to Hungary
- List of ambassadors of Peru to Romania
- List of ambassadors of Peru to Poland
