= List of ambassadors of Peru to Vietnam =

Ambassador of Peru to the Socialist Republic of Vietnam
- Great Seal of Peru
- Ministry of Foreign Affairs
- Appointer: The president of Peru
- Inaugural holder: Carlos Bérninzon Devéscovi (resident in Hanoi)
- Formation: 2015
- Website: Embassy of Peru in Vietnam

The extraordinary and plenipotentiary ambassador of Peru to the Socialist Republic of Vietnam is the official representative of the Republic of Peru to the Socialist Republic of Vietnam.

Peru first recognized South Vietnam during the era of a divided Vietnam. This recognition continued even after the establishment of Juan Velasco Alvarado's left-leaning Revolutionary Government. After the country's collapse and succession by a puppet government and eventually its northern counterpart, Peru only reestablished relations with the new Vietnamese state in 1994.

A Peruvian embassy was opened in Hanoi in 2015. The resident ambassador is accredited to neighbouring Laos.

== List of representatives ==
Name	Portrait	Term begin	Term end	President	Notes
Óscar Maúrtua		1995	1999	Alberto Fujimori	Resident in Bangkok, also accredited to Laos.
Carlos Bérninzon Devéscovi		February 1, 2015	2015	Ollanta Humala	First resident ambassador in Hanoi.
Augusto Morelli Salgado		January 15, 2018	2026	Pedro Pablo Kuczynski	As ambassador; concurrent with Laos.

== See also ==
- List of ambassadors of Peru to Thailand
