= List of ambassadors of Hungary to Peru =

Ambassador of Hungary to the Republic of Peru
- Incumbent; András Beck since July 13, 2023
- Inaugural holder: Wilhelm Brauns
- Formation: 1864

The Hungarian ambassador in Lima is the official representative of the Government in Budapest to the Government of Peru.

== Background ==
Both countries established relations in the 19th century. In 1851, Austria–Hungary recognized the independence of Peru, and both countries subsequently established relations. As a result of World War I, Peru severed relations with both Germany and Austria–Hungary in 1917, reestablishing them in 1920.

After the 1968 Peruvian coup d'état and the establishment of Juan Velasco Alvarado's Revolutionary Government, relations were renewed in April 1969 with the Hungarian People's Republic as the new Peruvian government pursued closer relations with the Soviet bloc. In 1970, the Presidential Council of the Hungarian People's Republic decided to open an embassy in Lima.

The Peruvian embassy in Budapest closed in January 2007 and reopened in 2017. Today, ethnic Hungarians in Latin America reside in Argentina and Peru for the most part.

== List of representatives ==
Name	Term begin	Term end	Head of state	Notes
Representatives of Austria and Hungary (1864–1919)
Wilhelm Brauns	1864	1872	Franz Joseph I	First honorary consul and representative of the Austrian Monarchy (later Austria-Hungary) to Peru. His term began with the opening of the consulate on the same year.
Christian Krüger	1872	1883	Franz Joseph I	
Jean Louis Dubois	1883	1898	Franz Joseph I	
Graham Row	1898	1899	Franz Joseph I	
Samuel Brahms	1899	1908	Franz Joseph I	
Walter Justus	1908	1918	Franz Joseph I	The honorary consulate in Lima closed in 1919.
Representatives of Hungary (since 1969)
Vilmos Meruk	1980	1985	György Lázár	As ambassador.
Adolf Széles	c. 1986	1991	György Lázár	As ambassador. He was the adoptive father of S’Iza
János Tóth	1991	1993	József Antall	As ambassador.
Jozsef Balazs	1996	?	Gyula Horn	As ambassador, resident in Colombia. He delivered his credentials on September 23, 1996.
Ferenc Nagy	2000	2002	Viktor Orbán	As ambassador. He presented his credentials on October 18, 2000.
Péter Kraft	2002	2003	Péter Medgyessy	As ambassador (also spelled "Craft"). He was involved in a financial and diplomatic incident with the Hungarian government in 2002.
2006–2017: Embassy in Peru closed; ambassador in Buenos Aires accredited instead
Gábor Kaleta	2017	April 2019	Viktor Orbán	As ambassador. Kaleta presented his credentials on March 6, 2017. He was removed from his post in 2019 after an international investigation uncovered that he had downloaded over 19,000 images of child pornography from a South Korean website, which were stored in his computer.
Katalin Tóth	2020	2021	Viktor Orbán	As ambassador, she delivered her credentials on March 4, 2021.
Katalin Kőrössy	2021	2023	Viktor Orbán	As ambassador, she delivered her credentials on October 7, 2021.
András Beck	July 13, 2023	Incumbent	Viktor Orbán	

== See also ==
- List of ambassadors of Peru to Hungary
