= Peru–Turkey relations =

- Peru: Turkey

Diplomatic mission
- Peruvian Embassy, Ankara: Turkish Embassy, Lima

Envoy
- Ambassador Luis Alberto Campana Boluarte: Ambassador Ali Rıza Özcoşkun

Peru–Turkey relations are foreign relations between the Republic of Peru and the Republic of Türkiye. Peru has an embassy in Ankara since 2010. Turkey has an embassy in Lima since 2010. Both countries are members of the World Trade Organization and the United Nations.

== Presidential visits ==
Guest	Host	Place of visit	Date of visit
(Turkey) President Recep Tayyip Erdoğan	(Peru) President Ollanta Humala	House of Pizarro, Lima	February 2–3, 2016

== Economic relations ==
Trade volume between the two countries was US$250 million in 2019 (Turkish exports/imports: 177.4/72.6 million USD).

== See also ==
- Foreign relations of Peru
- Foreign relations of Turkey
- List of ambassadors of Peru to Turkey
- List of ambassadors of Turkey to Peru
