= List of ambassadors of Peru to Yugoslavia =

Ambassador of Peru to the Socialist Federal Republic of Yugoslavia
- Great Seal of Peru
- Ministry of Foreign Affairs; Terazije 1, Belgrade (2006)
- Appointer: The president of Peru
- Inaugural holder: Edwin Letts Sánchez
- Formation: October 1942
- Abolished: 1992 (SFRY); 2006 (FRY)

The extraordinary and plenipotentiary ambassador of Peru to the Socialist Federal Republic of Yugoslavia was the official representative of the Republic of Peru to the Socialist Federal Republic of Yugoslavia.

After Peru recognized and established relations with Albania in late 1971, the ambassador in Belgrade became accredited to Albania (today accredited to the Peruvian Ambassador to Greece).

Peru first established economic and consular relations with the Yugoslav government-in-exile in October 1942, during World War II. Regardless, relations had already existed beforehand, as consulates existed in Belgrade and Zagreb by 1929. After the 1968 Peruvian coup d'état and the establishment of Juan Velasco Alvarado's Revolutionary Government, relations were renewed in 1968, and an embassy opened in Belgrade the same year.

After the breakup of Yugoslavia, Peru continued relations with the Federal Republic of Yugoslavia (Serbia and Montenegro). At the same time, Peru also recognized the other states that succeeded Yugoslavia, such as Croatia in 1993.

The embassy in Belgrade closed in December 2006, a couple of months after the independence of Montenegro, and the Peruvian Ambassador to Romania became accredited to Serbia until 2018, when the Peruvian Ambassador to Hungary became accredited instead after a series of reforms.

As of 2023, Peru is accredited to Serbia and Bosnia and Herzegovina from its embassy in Budapest; to Croatia, Montenegro and North Macedonia from its embassy in Bucharest; and to Slovenia from its embassy in Vienna.

Peru has not established relations with Kosovo. However, its recognition of the breakaway state after its declaration of independence in 2008 led to controversy with the Serbian authorities, who recalled their ambassador for a couple of months.

== List of representatives ==
Name	Portrait	Term begin	Term end	President	Notes
Edwin Letts Sánchez		March 22, 1943	July 1945	Manuel Prado Ugarteche	As chargé d’affaires en pied to the Yugoslav government-in-exile, also accredited to the wartime governments of the Netherlands, Czechoslovakia, Norway, Poland and as chargé d’affaires a.i. to the Belgian government in exile in London.
Medardo Franco Calle		December 9, 1968	1968	Juan Velasco Alvarado	As Chargé d'Affaires.
Carlos Vásquez Ayllón		1968	1974	Juan Velasco Alvarado	Vásquez arrived to the embassy in Belgrade as the first secretary-consul general in 1968, later becoming the first ambassador to Yugoslavia after the presentation of his credentials on July 10, 1969. Soon, the embassy moved to a new address: Bulevar JNA 189.
Andrés Aramburu Álvarez-Calderón		1974?	?	Juan Velasco Alvarado	As Ambassador
Alberto Wagner de Reyna		1975	1978	Juan Velasco Alvarado	As Ambassador
Jorge Guillermo Llosa Pautrat		1977	1977	Francisco Morales Bermúdez	As Ambassador
Hugo Ernesto Palma Valderrama		March 1980	1982	Francisco Morales Bermúdez	As Ambassador
Javier Paulinich Velarde		1982	1984	Fernando Belaúnde	As Ambassador
Eduardo Llosa Larrabure		1984	?	Fernando Belaúnde	As Ambassador
Carlos Higueras Ramos		1986	?	Alan García	As Ambassador
Eduardo Llosa Larrabure		January 1991	?	Alberto Fujimori	As Ambassador
Luis Benjamin Chimoy Arteaga		?	?	Alberto Fujimori	As Ambassador
Julio Walter Negreiros Portella		January 27, 2004	December 31, 2006	Alejandro Toledo	Final ambassador to Serbia and Montenegro and first ambassador to Serbia. Concurrent with Albania from October 16, 2004, and to North Macedonia from October 4, 2005. Both accreditations expired on August 24, 2007.

== See also ==
- List of ambassadors of Peru to Croatia
- List of ambassadors of Peru to Bosnia and Herzegovina
- List of ambassadors of Peru to Montenegro
- List of ambassadors of Peru to North Macedonia
- List of ambassadors of Peru to Serbia
- List of ambassadors of Peru to Slovenia
- List of ambassadors of Peru to the Soviet Union
- List of ambassadors of Peru to Czechoslovakia
- List of ambassadors of Peru to East Germany
- List of ambassadors of Peru to Bulgaria
- List of ambassadors of Peru to Albania
- List of ambassadors of Peru to Hungary
- List of ambassadors of Peru to Romania
- List of ambassadors of Peru to Poland
