= Norway–Peru relations =

- Norway: Peru

Diplomatic mission
- None (Accredited from Santiago): Embassy of Peru, Oslo

Norway–Peru relations refers to the bilateral relations between the Kingdom of Norway and the Republic of Peru. Both nations are members of the World Trade Organization and the United Nations.

== History ==
Both countries established diplomatic relations in 1923. During World War II, Peru maintained relations with the Norwegian government-in-exile based in London, as well as other governments-in-exile.

Norway considers relations with Peru their second most important in the region, and as such invests in several different areas of the country's infrastructure and economy. In 2014, both countries signed, along with Germany, a climate and forest partnership in order to reduce forest-related emissions and to recognise land for indigenous peoples' land claims. Peru opened an embassy in Oslo in June 2017.

== High-level visits ==
High-level visits from Norway to Peru

- Vice President of the Storting Morten Høglund (2014)

== Trade ==
Peru signed a free trade agreement with the European Free Trade Association on June 24 and July 14 in Reykjavík and Lima, respectively. It entered into force on July 1, 2012. Trade between both countries has steadily increased, with Norwegian exports reaching US$ 26,8 million in 2021.

== Resident diplomatic missions ==
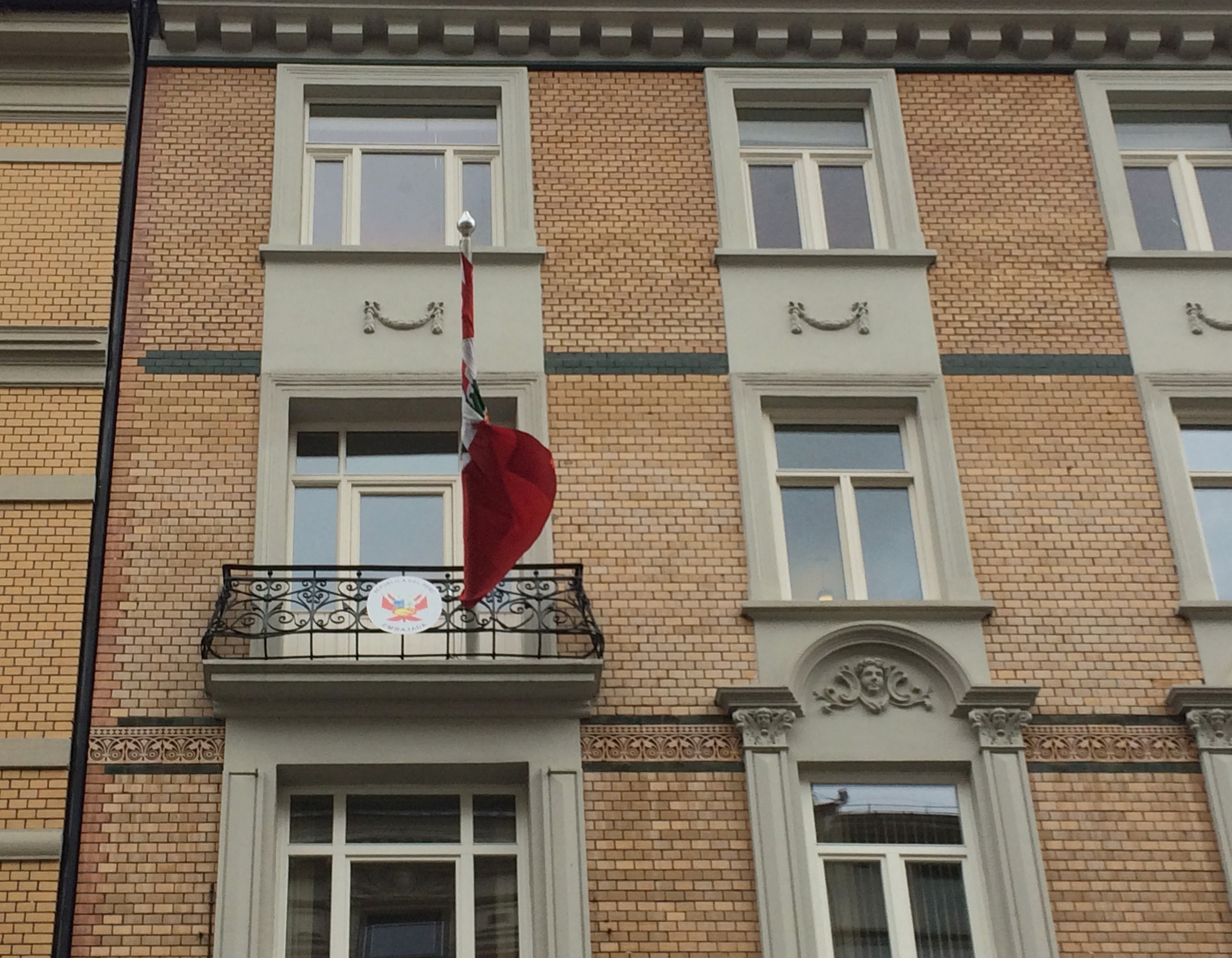
Peruvian embassy in Oslo

- Peru has an embassy in Oslo.
- Norway is accredited to Peru from its embassy in Santiago and has an honorary consulate in Lima.

== See also ==
- Foreign relations of Norway
- Foreign relations of Peru
- List of ambassadors of Peru to Norway
