= Hungary–Peru relations =

- Hungary: Peru

Diplomatic mission
- Embassy of Hungary, Lima: Embassy of Peru, Budapest

Hungary–Peru relations are the bilateral relations between Hungary and the Republic of Peru. Both countries are members of the United Nations.

== History ==
Both countries established relations in the 19th century. In 1851, Austria-Hungary recognized the independence of Peru, and both countries subsequently established relations. As a result of World War I, Peru severed relations with both Germany and Austria-Hungary.

After the 1968 Peruvian coup d'état and the establishment of Juan Velasco Alvarado's Revolutionary Government, relations were renewed in April 1969 with the Hungarian People's Republic as the new Peruvian government pursued closer relations with the Soviet bloc. Due to this diplomatic approach, after the expropriation and nationalisation of the International Petroleum Company's oil refinery in Peru by the Peruvian Army and the subsequent dispute it generated between Peru and the United States, the former was backed by the aforementioned bloc when the issue was raised at the United Nations.

The Hungarian embassy in Lima closed in 2006 and reopened in 2017. The Peruvian embassy in Budapest closed in January 2007 and reopened in 2017.

== Trade ==
A Free Trade Agreement between Peru and the European Union, of which Hungary is a part of, was signed with Colombia in Brussels, Belgium. It entered into force in Peru on March 1, 2013.

== High-level visits ==
High-level visits from Hungary to Peru

- President Árpád Göncz (1999)
- PPCU Rector Szabolcs Szuromi
- Speaker László Kövér (2018)
- Minister Péter Szijjártó (2017 & 2022)

High-level visits from Peru to Hungary

- Foreign Minister Eduardo Ferrero Costa (1998)
- President Alberto Fujimori (1998)

== Diaspora ==
In Latin America, ethnic Hungarians mostly reside in Argentina and Peru. In the 19th century, citizens of Austria–Hungary also settled in Peru.

== Resident diplomatic missions ==
- Hungary has an embassy in Lima.
- Peru has an embassy in Budapest.
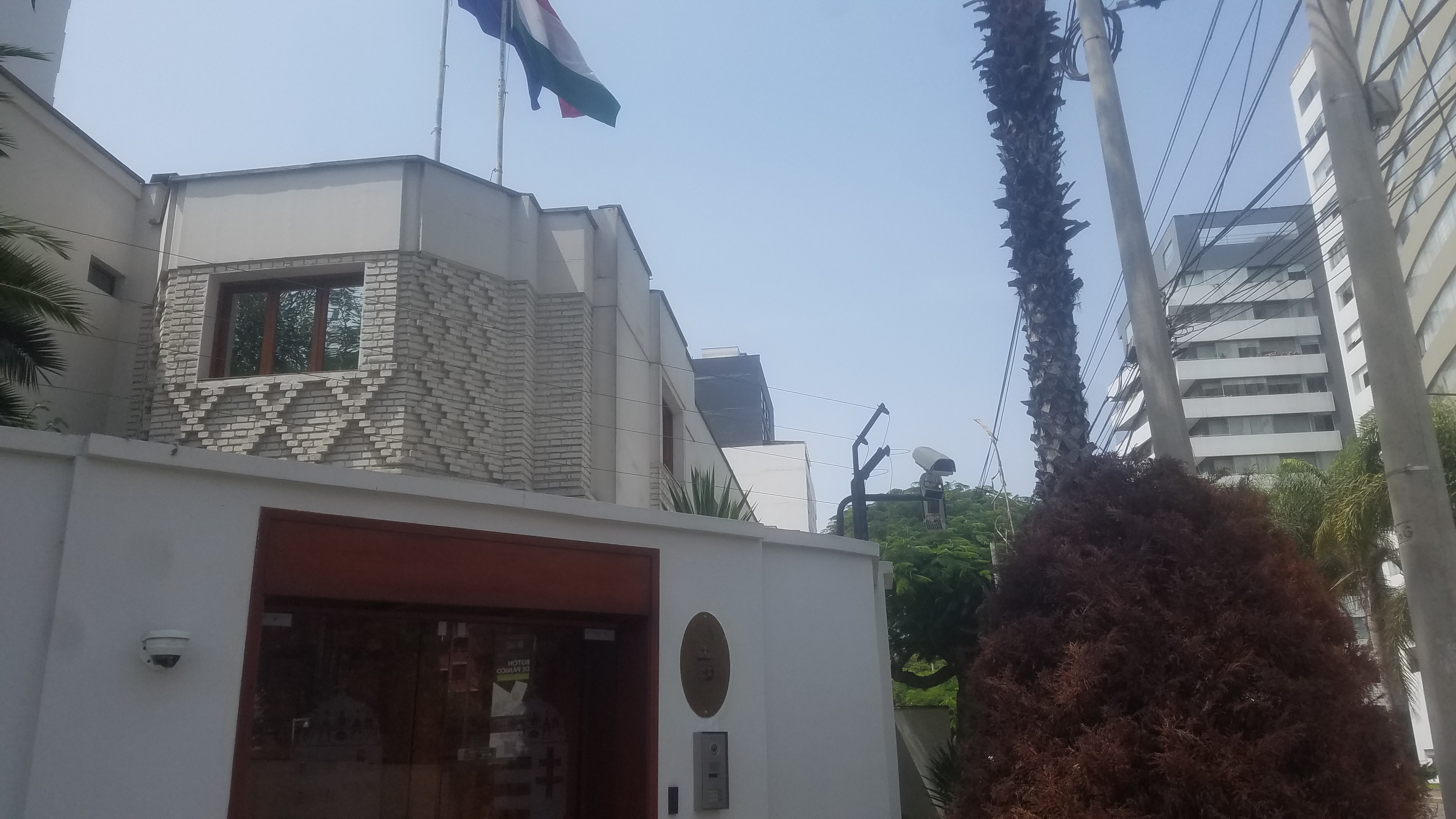
Embassy of Hungary, Lima

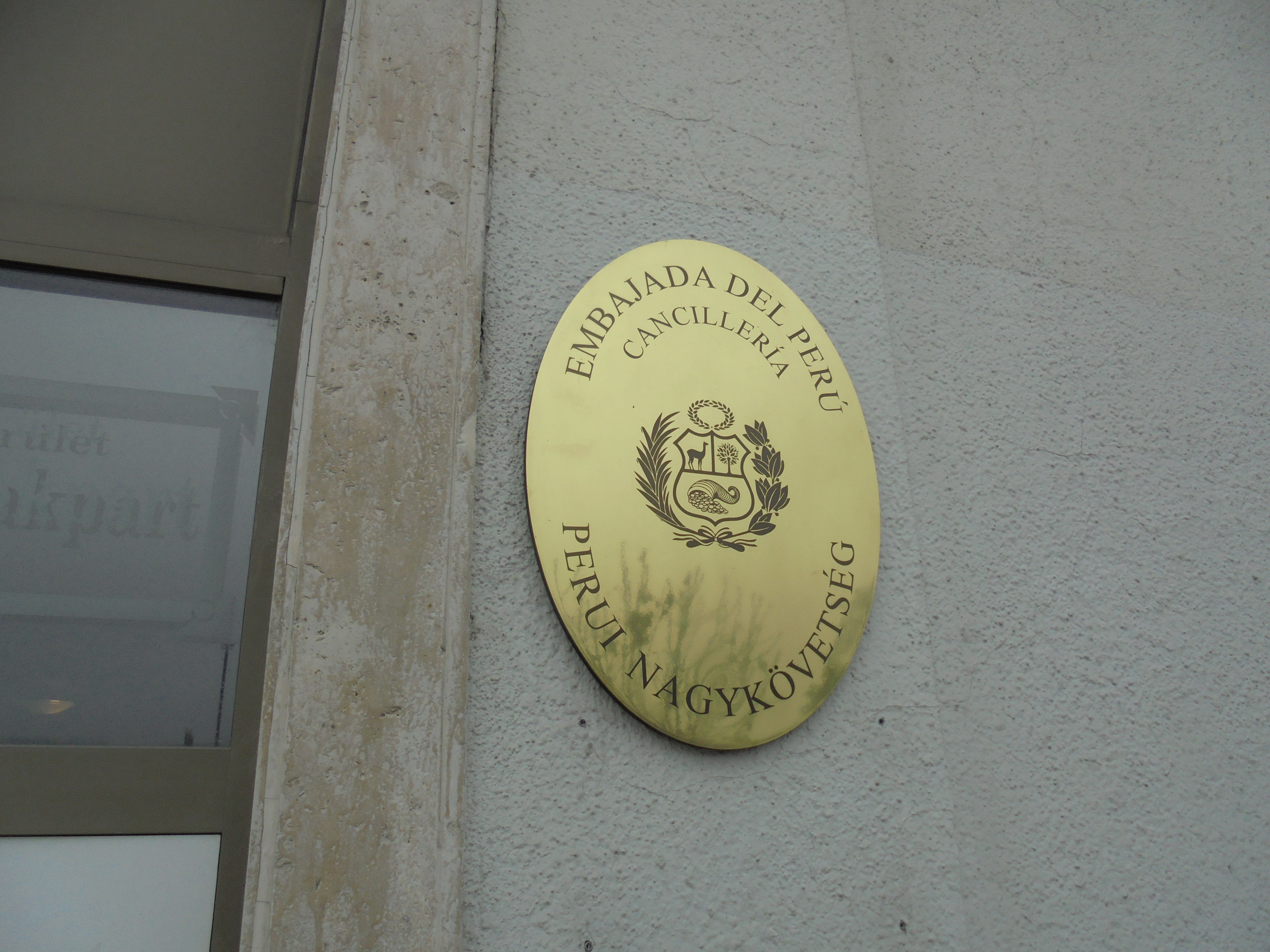
Embassy of Peru, Budapest

== See also ==
- Foreign relations of Hungary
- Foreign relations of Peru
- List of ambassadors of Hungary to Peru
- List of ambassadors of Peru to Hungary
