= Plan Túpac Amaru =

The Túpac Amaru Plan (Spanish: Plan Túpac Amaru) was a plan applied by Francisco Morales Bermúdez in 1977 during the so-called Revolutionary Government of the Armed Forces. The objective of the plan was to consolidate the revolutionary process initiated by Juan Velasco Alvarado and alleviate the consequences of the economic crisis that Peru had been facing since 1975.

As a replacement for the Inca Plan, the Tupac Amaru Plan was conceived as the continuation of the revolution without it being communist or capitalist in nature. The Tupac Amaru Plan was promulgated in October 1977 having as important points: the elaboration of a new constitution through a constituent assembly and a greater emphasis on the dynamic role of private investment.

== See also ==
- 1978 Peruvian Constituent Assembly election
- Constitution of Peru (1979)
