= List of ambassadors of Peru to the Netherlands =

Ambassador of Peru to the Kingdom of the Netherlands
- Great Seal of Peru
- Ministry of Foreign Affairs
- Appointer: The president of Peru
- Website: Embassy of Peru in the Netherlands

The extraordinary and plenipotentiary ambassador of Peru to the Kingdom of the Netherlands is the official representative of the Republic of Peru to the Kingdom of the Netherlands.

Peru and the Netherlands established relations in 1826. Said relations were raised from Legation to Embassy in 1956.

== List of representatives ==
Name	Portrait	Term begin	Term end	President	Notes
Ricardo Rivera Schreiber		1926	c. 1929	Augusto B. Leguía	As Chargé d'affaires.
Pedro Ugarteche y Tizón		after 1933	before 1936	Augusto B. Leguía	As Chargé d'affaires.
Francisco Tudela y Varela		1936	1936	Óscar R. Benavides	As Envoy Extraordinary and Minister Plenipotentiary.
Edwin Letts Sánchez		March 22, 1943	July 1945	Manuel Prado Ugarteche	As chargé d’affaires en pied to the Dutch government-in-exile, also accredited to the wartime governments of Yugoslavia, Czechoslovakia, Norway, Poland and as chargé d’affaires a.i. to the Belgian government in exile in London.
Humberto Fernández Dávila		1952	1956	Manuel A. Odría	First ambassador as relations were elevated to embassy level in 1956.
Alejandro Freundt Rosell		1956	1958	Manuel Prado Ugarteche	As ambassador.
Manuel Seoane Corrales		1958	1961	Manuel Prado Ugarteche	As ambassador.
René Hooper López		?	1981	Francisco Morales Bermúdez	As ambassador.
Luis Sabogal		?	?	Fernando Belaúnde	As ambassador.
José Antonio Arróspide del Busto		2004	2007	Alejandro Toledo	As ambassador.
Gilbert Chauny de Porturas-Hoyle		2007	2008	Alan García	As ambassador.
Allan Wagner Tizón		2008	2014	Alan García	As ambassador.
Carlos Andrés Miguel Herrera Rodríguez		December 15, 2014	2020	Ollanta Humala	As ambassador.
Marisol Flavia Agüero Colunga		December 2, 2020	2026	Francisco Sagasti	As ambassador.

== See also ==
- List of ambassadors of the Netherlands to Peru
