= List of ambassadors of Peru to Norway =

Ambassador of Peru to the Kingdom of Norway
- Great Seal of Peru
- Incumbent; Vacant since September 2022
- Ministry of Foreign Affairs; Arbins gate 2, 4F, Oslo
- Appointer: The president of Peru
- Website: Embassy of Peru in Norway

The extraordinary and plenipotentiary ambassador of Peru to the Kingdom of Norway is the official representative of the Republic of Peru to the Kingdom of Norway. The ambassador in Oslo is also accredited to Iceland since 2018.

Both countries established diplomatic relations in the 20th century, and Peru opened an embassy in Oslo in June 2017.

== List of representatives ==
Name	Portrait	Term begin	Term end	President	Notes
Edwin Letts Sánchez		March 22, 1943	July 1945	Manuel Prado Ugarteche	As chargé d’affaires en pied to the Yugoslav government-in-exile, also accredited to the wartime governments of the Netherlands, Czechoslovakia, Norway, Poland and as chargé d’affaires a.i. to the Belgian government in exile in London.
Alejandro Freundt Rosell		1950	1952	Manuel A. Odría	As Envoy Extraordinary and Minister Plenipotentiary.
G. Víctor Proaño Correa		1956	?	Manuel A. Odría	As Envoy Extraordinary and Minister Plenipotentiary.
Jorge Guillermo Llosa Pautrat		1985	?	Alan García	As ambassador; accredited from Stockholm.
Jaime Stiglich		1993	?	Alberto Fujimori	As ambassador; accredited from Stockholm to Denmark, Norway, Iceland and Finland.
José Rafael Eduardo Beraún Araníbar		2013	2017	Ollanta Humala	As ambassador; accredited from Stockholm.
José Luis Salinas Montes		2017	2020	Pedro Pablo Kuczynski	Accredited to Iceland from 2015.
Gustavo Antonio Otero Zapata		June 18, 2020	2022	Martín Vizcarra	As ambassador; accredited to Iceland.
Isabel Soria Reátegui		August 15, 2022	September 2022	Pedro Castillo	As ambassador.

== See also ==
- List of ambassadors of Peru to Denmark
- List of ambassadors of Peru to Finland
- List of ambassadors of Peru to Sweden
