= List of ambassadors of Turkey to Peru =

Ambassador of Turkey to Peru
- Incumbent; Serra Kaleli since January 25, 2023
- Ministry of Foreign Affairs
- Residence: Lima
- Seat: Av. Miguel Cervantes 530, Lima
- Inaugural holder: Namık Güner Erpul
- Formation: February 15, 2010

The Turkish ambassador to Peru is the chief Turkish diplomat to Peru. The ambassador in Lima is also accredited to Bolivia.

Relations between Turkey and Peru were established in 1952, and resident embassies were opened by both states in 2010. The Turkish ambassador was previously accredited from Santiago de Chile.

== List of representatives ==
Name	Portrait	Term begin	Term end	President	Notes
Namık Güner Erpul		February 15, 2010	January 9, 2014	Abdullah Gül	First resident ambassador in Lima.
Ferda Akkerman		February 5, 2014	December 15, 2018	Abdullah Gül	
Ali Rıza Özcoşkun		December 15, 2018	January 16, 2023	Recep Tayyip Erdoğan	
Serra Kaleli		January 26, 2023	Incumbent	Recep Tayyip Erdoğan	

== See also ==
- List of ambassadors of Peru to Turkey
- Peru–Turkey relations
