= Gábor Kaleta =

Hungarian diplomat

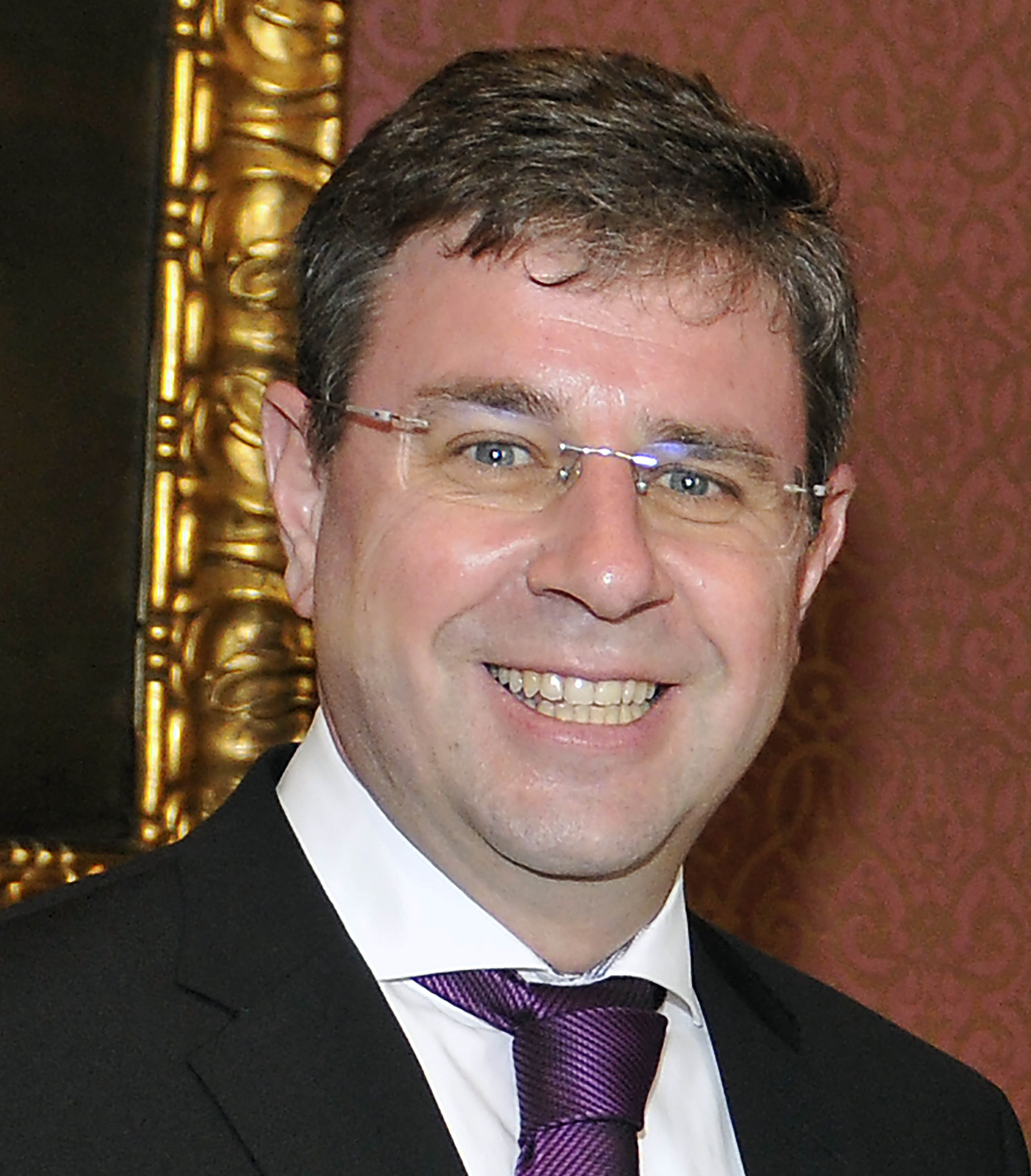

Ambassador of Hungary to Peru
- In office 2017–2019
- Preceded by: Miklós Deák
- Succeeded by: Katalin Tóth

Personal details
- Born: c. 1975 Székesfehérvár
- Spouse: Anita Jasinka
- Education: Pannonhalma High School; Pázmány Péter Catholic University

Gábor Kaleta (born c. 1975) is a Hungarian diplomat who served as his country's ambassador to Peru from 2017 to 2019. In July 2020, he was given a suspended prison sentence for possessing 19,000 photographs of child pornography he had downloaded from a South Korean video-sharing website known as Welcome to Video.

== Early life ==
He grew up in Székesfehérvár, from where he moved in 1989, when he was 14 years old. However, he has since moved back. He finished primary school at the legal predecessor of the Víziváros Primary School in Székesfehérvár. He started his secondary education at the age of 14, in 1989, at the Benedictine High School of Pannonhalma. He completed his diplomatic studies at the Faculty of State and Law of the University of Pécs. He passed his legal examination at Pázmány Péter Catholic University. He has advanced language exams in English and German.

== Career ==
In 2001, he was successfully admitted to the Ministry of Foreign Affairs, where he initially worked in the American Department. After that, he started working in the foreign service, from 2007 to 2011 he was the first subordinate and consul in Los Angeles, and from 2011 he was the deputy head of the American Department. After that, he held the position of press chief of the Ministry of Foreign Affairs and then of the Ministry of Justice. After the position of press chief, he took a job at the Department of Latin America and the Caribbean of the Ministry of Foreign Affairs and Trade.

In 2017, he was appointed head of the Hungarian embassy in Peru, which was reopened after its closure in 2006, and in 2018, he became accredited to Bolivia as well. One of his last actions as ambassador was a visit to the district of Pueblo Libre, where he was last photographed before his arrest and extradition.

== Arrest ==
In 2018 and 2019, under the leadership of United States and South Korean investigative authorities, in the framework of an international collaboration, the Welcome to Video child pornography sharing site was busted and many of its users were identified, including Kaleta. After they were informed about his identification by U.S. investigators, the Hungarian authorities secretly brought Kaleta home in March 2019 with the secrecy being allegedly requested by the U.S. for the sake of the investigation. Once in Hungary, he was then relieved of his duties as an ambassador, and in November the General Prosecutor's Office brought charges against him. All of this became public knowledge only in February 2020 with a report by Index.hu contributor András Dezső as even the members of the Hungarian Parliament's foreign affairs committee were not informed of the situation.

Kaleta admitted his guilt at the trial, and the court at first instance sentenced him to a one-year suspended prison sentence and a fine of HUF 540,000. Kaleta's lawyer, Csaba Mester, appealed against the verdict, but later withdrew the appeal, so the verdict became final. Foreign Minister Péter Szijjártó stated after the first instance hearing that "whatever is possible and what the law allows will be made public". According to later news, however, the authorities did not act strictly against Kaleta and did not reveal much information even when directly asked.

The criminal trial of Gábor Kaleta caused intense debate and outrage. Referring to the Kaleta case and the verdict, which was considered too lenient, with major public figures calling it outrageous, unacceptable and "basically an acquittal", government representatives from Fidesz presented the Lex Kaleta, an "anti-pedophile" legislative package in the Parliament. The 2021 law restricts minors' access to books and other media depicting or "promoting" homosexuality and gender reassignment. It has been criticised by human rights groups and the European Union for lumping together paedophilia with homosexuality and transsexuality.
