= Welcome to Video case =

Investigation and prosecution of child sexual exploitation ring

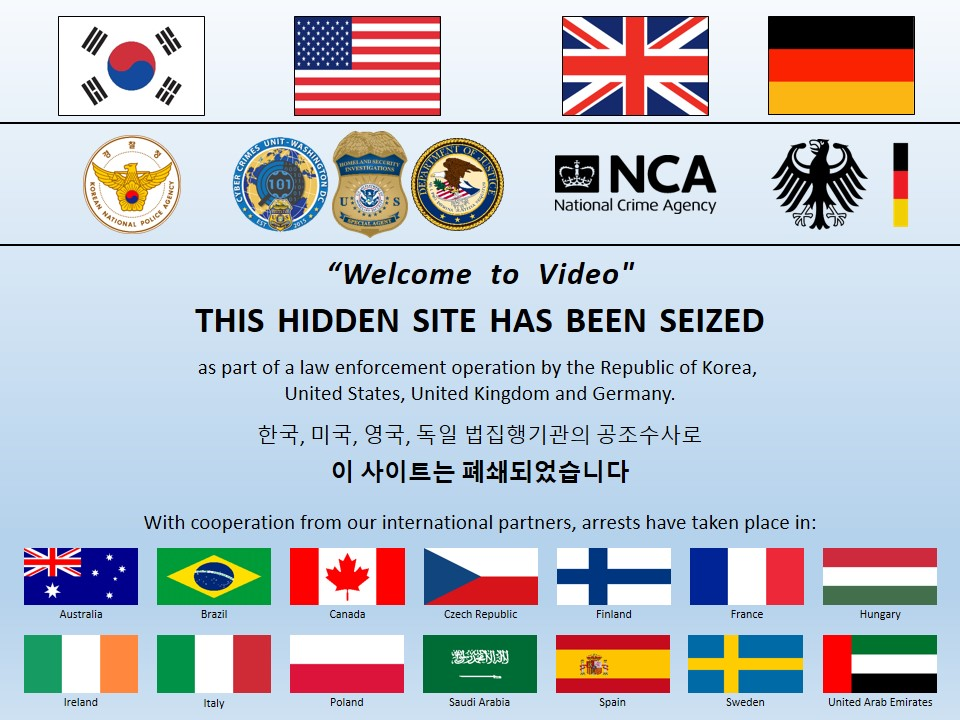
Screenshot captured from the dark web moments after the website was seized by law enforcement agencies.

The Welcome to Video case involved the investigation and prosecution of a child pornography ring which traded videos through the South Korean website Welcome to Video, owned and operated by Son Jung-woo (or Jeong-woo). Authorities estimated about 360,000 downloads had been made through the website, which had roughly 1.2 million members, 4,000 of which were paid members, from 38 countries. Through international cooperation and investigations, 337 people were arrested on charges of possessing child pornography.

== Offenses ==
Son downloaded videos of child sexual exploitation from child sexual abuse material distribution site AVSNOO and re-uploaded them to his own server. Users download videos using points purchased with Bitcoin and could trade video uploads for points, encouraging them to add their own material. Forty-five percent of the videos on the site had not been encountered previously by investigators.

== Investigations and trials ==
=== Start of international cooperation investigation ===
The first organization to investigate Welcome To Video was the United States Internal Revenue Service Criminal Investigations (IRS-CI), which found transactions made with cryptocurrency on child pornography websites, and asked the US Homeland Security Investigations (HSI) for cooperation in their work. IRS-CI investigators, in the Cyber and Forensic Services, led by executive director Jarod Koopman, found that the Welcome to Video servers were poorly secured, finding the IP address of the server embedded within the source code, allowing them to determine the location of the server. This action revealed the website was operating from South Korea. This allowed investigators to identify and trace Bitcoin payments from suspects. HSI delivered related information to the Korean National Police Agency (KNPA), leading to the arrest of Son.

=== Prosecution of Son Jung-woo ===
==== First trial ====
Son was arrested in March 2018 and charged in May. His charges included receiving about ₩400 million (~$360,000) in cryptocurrency from 4,000 paid members and providing them with 3,055 articles of child pornography. In addition, 156 Korean citizens were charged with possession of child pornography (as of 1 May 2019). Many of those charged were unmarried men in their 20s, including office workers and college students; others included doctors, civil servants, and school teachers. One user had a history of child sex crimes and had access to roughly 48,000 articles of child pornography.

Son reportedly appointed seven lawyers through a law firm. The first trial court found Son violated the Act on the Protection of Children and Youth Against Sex Offenses and Act on Promotion of Information and Communications Network Utilization and Information Protection, etc. and sentenced him to two years in prison and three years of probation. However, the sentence was suspended.

==== Second trial and sentence confirmed ====
As a result of the first trial, Son left the detention center after six months. He was represented by a public defender during the second trial. In April 2019, in the midst of this trial, he registered his marriage and appealed to the court that he had a family to support. In May 2019, the second trial court sentenced him to one and a half years in prison, stating "Acts such as selling child pornography for a large profit for a long time can distort the perception of children sexually." Authorities also seized the revenues from the website.

==== Examination of US extradition warrant ====
In October 2019, when authorities publicly announced the international investigation, US prosecutors indicted Son on nine charges, including conspiracy to post child pornography. The US Department of Justice (DOJ) requested his extradition from South Korea. In April 2020, South Korea's Ministry of Justice requested a criminal extradition warrant for Son. On 27 April, the expiration date of Son's sentence, the Seoul High Prosecutors' Office executed this warrant, resulting in his continued confinement at the Seoul Detention Center.

The extradition warrant had been filed for international money laundering, a crime in South Korea which did not overlap with the convictions made domestically. At a 19 May hearing, the prosecution argued that the evidence was sufficient for extradition, while Son's lawyer expressed concerns about additional punishment (double jeopardy). At a 16 June hearing, Son said he would "gladly accept any severe sentence" if tried in South Korea but said he did not wish to be extradited and leave his family. The prosecution noted the South Korea–U.S. Extradition Treaty stated an extradited person can only be punished for the extradition crimes.

On 6 July, the extradition request was denied. The High Court decided that Son's continued presence in South Korea would be useful in the country's continuing investigations against child exploitation.

==== Third trial ====
In July 2022, Son was sentenced to 24 months in prison for concealing his financial proceeds from the Welcome to Video operation and for using some of those proceeds for online gambling.

=== Outcome from the international cooperation investigation ===
According to the announcement of the KNPA and the US DOJ on 16 October 2019, investigative agencies from 38 countries made arrests based on the evidence jointly collected from Welcome to Video by the KNPA; the US HSI, IRS and Federal Attorney's Office; the UK National Crime Agency; and the German District Attorney's Office. At that time, the number of arrests was reported as 310 from 32 countries (per KNPA) or 337 from 38 countries (per US officials) including UK, Ireland, US, South Korea, Germany, Spain, Saudi Arabia, the United Arab Emirates, Czech Republic, Canada, etc. Among them were 223 Koreans, who accounted for 72 percent of the people arrested.

==== United States ====
Americans convicted and sentenced for their roles in the case include:

- Anthony Bellisario, owner of RKB Electric And Supply in Carnegie and resident of Robinson Township, Allegheny County, PA was sentenced in federal court to 90 months’ imprisonment for downloading approximately 1,673 files and uploading approximately six files. Law enforcement discovered 1,000 unique videos and 443 unique images of child sexual abuse material in addition to 769 unique videos and 9,340 unique images of child erotica.
- Nicholas Stengel of Washington, D.C., was sentenced to 15 years in prison in October 2018 for downloading 2,686 videos from the site.
- Richard Gratkowski, a former Homeland Security Investigations agent, pleaded guilty and was sentenced in May 2019 to 70 months in prison. Gratkowski appealed his conviction by claiming the investigation violated his Fourth Amendment rights, but in 2020 the Court of Appeals for the Fifth Circuit upheld the conviction in United States v. Gratkowski. The court found that, because the blockchain is publicly available, Gratkowski had no reasonable expectation of privacy in the transaction data posted to it that the government had analyzed to find him, and that furthermore, under the third party doctrine he had no reasonable expectation of privacy in the information that he had provided to the third party cryptocurrency exchange he had used.
- Stephen P. Langlois, an Army veteran residing in Rhode Island, was sentenced in May 2019 to 42 months in prison for downloading 114 videos from the site.

==== United Kingdom ====
The National Crime Agency released the names and faces of users of the website. Matthew Falder, a Cambridge-educated geophysical researcher at the University of Birmingham who coerced numerous victims into sending him pictures of them hurting themselves, was arrested in June 2017 and sentenced to 25 years in prison. Kyle Fox was sentenced to 22 years in prison for uploading a video of a 5-year-old boy and a 3-year-old girl he sexually assaulted.

==== Hungary ====
Gábor Kaleta, the Hungarian ambassador to Peru, pleaded guilty after he was found to have downloaded over 19,000 images from the site. He was flown home in complete secrecy in March 2019, after the American investigators identified him; the Hungarian public learned about the case in February 2020. In July 2020 Kaleta was sentenced to a fine of 540,000 forints (~1500 EUR) and one year in prison, suspended for two years. The sentence has widely been considered too lenient, with major public figures calling it outrageous, unacceptable and "basically an acquittal". Governing party Fidesz reacted with Lex Kaleta, a law intended to fight pedophilia. The 2021 law was criticised by human rights groups and the European Union for lumping together pedophilia with homosexuality and transsexuality. This law restricts minors from accessing LGBTQ-related books, films and other media. It also limits sex education in schools. It also banned pride events in public space by 2025 and anyone who participate could face fines for up to €500 and organizers to face 1 year in jail.

== Aftermath ==
The light sentence given to Son angered many in South Korea, which grew in 2020 when Son filed to annul his marriage after claiming a need to support a "family" as an argument for a lenient sentence. In September 2020, the country's Supreme Court increased the sentencing guidelines to 5 to 29 1/4 years for producing child pornography (minimum 7 years for recidivism and 10 1/2 years for habitual offenders), 6 to 27 years for selling it, 4 to 18 years for distributing it, and 1 1/2 to 6 3/4 years for purchasing it. For comparison, downloaders of child pornography in the United States could face 5 to 15 years under U.S. federal sentencing guidelines.
