= Vilmos Meruk =

Hungarian philosopher (1921–2010)

Ambassador of Hungary to Peru
- In office 1980–1985

Ambassador of Hungary to Cuba
- In office 1971–1977

Personal details
- Born: 23 February 1921 Budapest, Hungary
- Died: 25 September 2010 (aged 89) Budapest, Hungary
- Education: Eötvös Loránd University

Vilmos Meruk (Budapest, 23 February 1921 — 25 September 2010) was a Hungarian philosopher, theatre director, cultural politician and diplomat.

== Biography ==
He was born in 1921 in Budapest. He studied in the Soviet Union and returned to Hungary in 1956. In 1962, he graduated from Eötvös Loránd University with a degree in philosophy. Between 1952 and 1962, he headed the Theatre and Music Department of the Ministry of Education and Culture. Between 1962 and 1964 he was the director of the National Theatre. After 1964, he headed the Ministry's Marxism–Leninism Education Department.

He was appointed ambassador extraordinary and plenipotentiary in 1971, he began his diplomatic service in Cuba, and between 1971 and 1977 he was the head of the Hungarian embassy in Havana. After that, he became the head of department at the Ministry of Foreign Affairs, and then—from 1977—the deputy head of the Institute of Cultural Relations. In 1980, he was appointed head of the embassy in Peru, where he served until 1985 (also accredited to Bolivia between 1982 and 1985), and then retired.

He died in 2010.
