= Federico Kauffmann Doig =

Peruvian historian, archaeologist and anthropologist

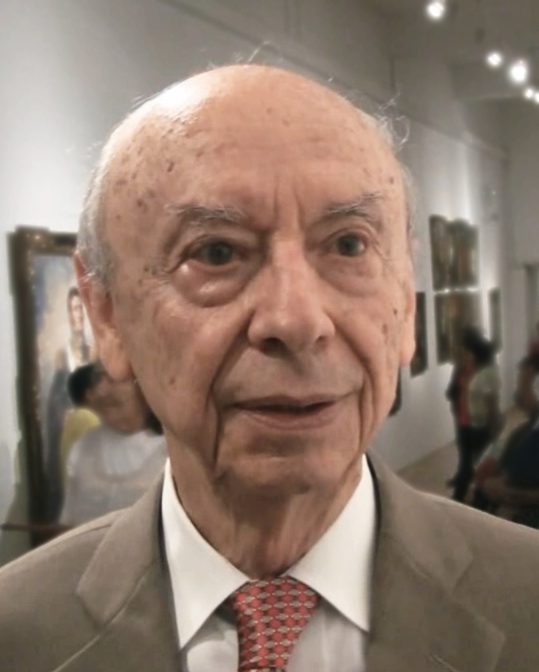
- Federico Kauffmann at 2011
- Born: September 20, 1928 (age 98); Chiclayo, Peru
- Occupations: Archaeology, Anthropology, History

Federico Kauffmann Doig (born September 20, 1928) is a Peruvian historian, archaeologist, and anthropologist. He has made great contributions to the study of the civilizations of Ancient Peru, particularly on the Chavín culture and the Chachapoya culture.

== Early life ==
Kauffmann Doig was born in Chiclayo, and spent his childhood and infancy in small localities of Cajamarca and Amazonas, particularly in Cocochillo (today Camporredondo) on the margin right hand of the River Marañon. His father was German but on the maternal side, he has ancestors of Scottish and Spanish origin, as well as ancestors who forged the millenary Mochica and Lambayeque or Sican cultures.

On having reached his secondary studies in the College of Our Lady of Guadalupe in Lima, he entered to the Universidad Nacional Mayor de San Marcos, who would grant him two times the doctorate: first in Archaeology and then in History.

== Academic career ==
Professor Doctor Federico Kauffmann-Doig was the Peruvian ambassador to Germany. He is descendant of John Doig who was born in Maybole on June 24, 1792, and who emigrated to Peru in 1820. As an ambassador, he already had a doctorate in archaeology, as well as a second doctorate in history. He has lectured at several of Peru's universities and, as a visiting professor at the University of Bonn he taught Peruvian and American archaeology. His prolific professional work has been honoured with the highest award given by Peru in the field of culture. He was the first Latin American to be awarded Sweden's Neubergh Medal. He has been decorated by the Peruvian government, as well as by the governments of Belgium, Austria and Sweden. He is a member of Peru's National Academy of History, an Honorary Member of the Barbier-Mueller Museum in Switzerland, a Member of the Royal Academy of History in Madrid, and the founding director of the Institute of Amazonian Archaeology. More about Professor Doctor Federico Kauffmann-Doig.

As a university professor, Kauffmann Doig has exercised the Director's charges of the Lima Art Museum. He was General manager of the Monumental and Cultural Patrimony of the Nation and the Director of the National Museum of the Archaeology, Anthropology, and History of Peru.

He has made many scientific contributions, highlighting his theory of the development of the Andean civilization as a result of the imbalance caused by the permanent growth of the population and the scarcity of soils suitable for cultivation, added to the devastating effects of the El Niño phenomenon. He is the father of the "aloctonist theory" of the origin of the ancient Peruvian culture. He has specialized in the study of the Andean Formative period, also known as the Early Horizon period or the Chavín influence period.

He has translated The Incas and their Ancestors and Machu Picchu: Inca Treasure.
