= Embassy of Peru, Oslo =

Peruvian diplomatic mission in Norway

Embassy of Peru in Norway
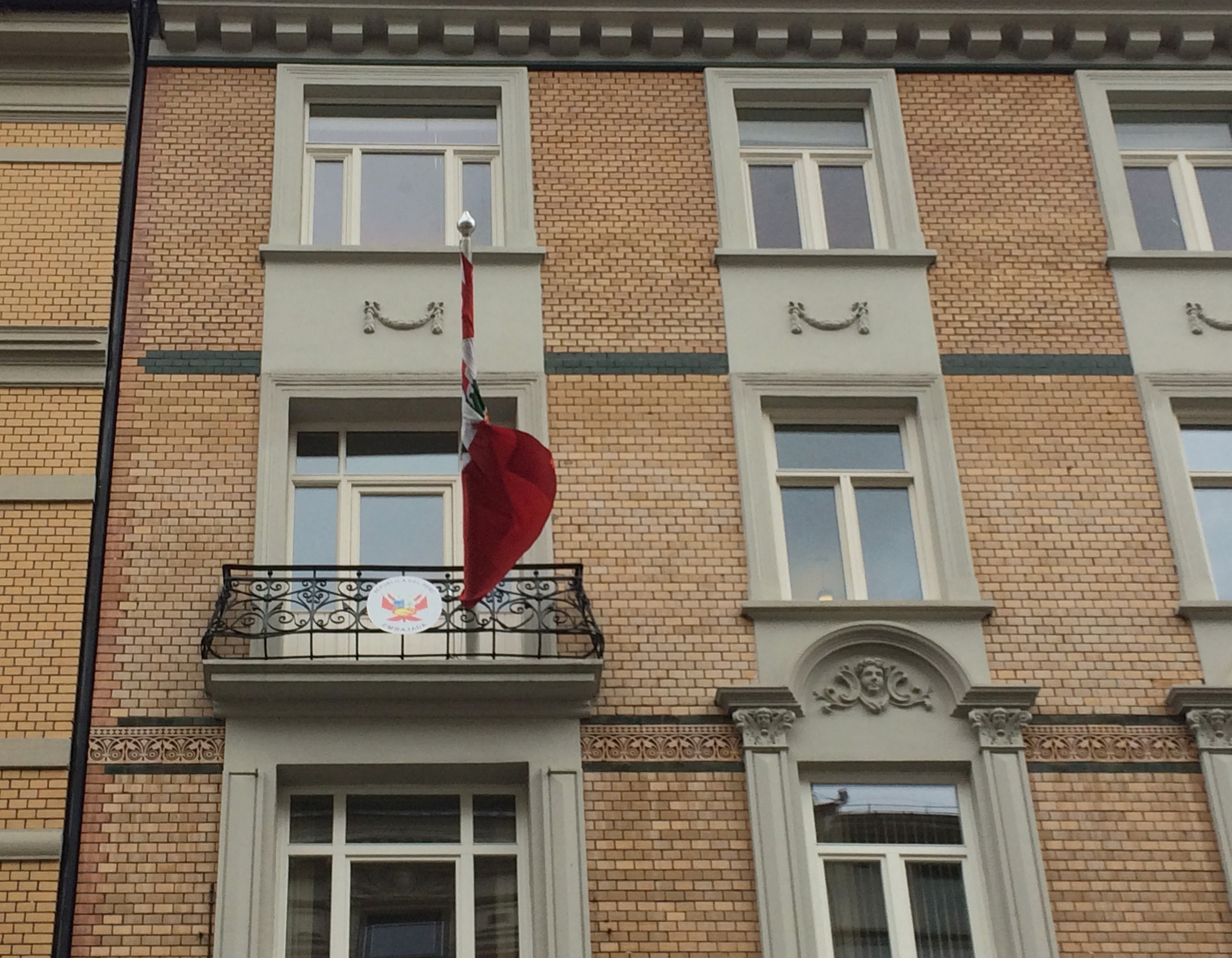
- Address: Arbins gate 2, 4F, Oslo
- Website: Official website

The Embassy of Peru in Norway (Norwegian: Perus ambassade i Norge, Spanish: Embajada del Perú en Noruega) is the foremost diplomatic mission of Peru in Norway.

The post of Peruvian ambassador to Norway is vacant since September 2022. The embassy's current counsellor is Julio Antonio Ubillús Ramírez.

== History ==
Both countries established diplomatic relations in 1933, and Peru opened an embassy in Oslo in June 2017. Norway is accredited to Peru from its embassy in Santiago de Chile.

In 2022, multiple attempts were made by Pedro Castillo's government to appoint Isabel Soria Reátegui, a member of Free Peru and an organizer for the party in Sweden during the 2021 elections, as ambassador to Norway. The attempts, eventually successful, were met with controversy, as Soria was reportedly unfit for the role.
