= Alberto Varillas =

Peruvian politician (1934–2025)

Minister of Education
- In office 8 May 1992 – 28 July 1993
- Preceded by: Augusto Antoniolli Vásquez
- Succeeded by: Raul Vittor Alfaro

Personal details
- Born: Alberto Varillas Montenegro; 26 January 1934; Lima, Peru
- Died: 5 January 2025 (aged 90); Lima, Peru
- Education: Pontifical Catholic University of Peru
- Occupation: Lawyer

Alberto Varillas Montenegro (26 January 1934 – 5 January 2025) was a Peruvian politician. He served as Minister of Education from 1992 to 1993 under Alberto Fujimori's presidency.

Varillas died in Lima on 5 January 2025, at the age of 90.

He became very famous among scholars of Peru's nineteenth century with La literatura peruana del siglo XIX: personificación y caracterización (1990), the first attempt at ordering the country's fervorous literary activity during that century.

He was also an active member of the Peruvian Academy of Language and of the Ricardo Palma Institute.
