= Plan Inca =

Rationing plan in Peru

The Inca Plan (Spanish: Plan Inca) was an instrument to rationalize development implemented by the military dictatorship of the self-proclaimed Revolutionary Government of the Armed Forces of Peru, based on the National Planning System. It was led by President Juan Velasco Alvarado, chairman of the ruling military junta during the dictatorship, with the recommendations of the Committee of Advisory Officials to the Presidency (Spanish: Comité de Oficiales Asesores de la Presidencia, COAP).

Plan Inca was announced on July 28, 1974, on the occasion of the 153rd anniversary of the independence of Peru.

== Goal ==
Within twenty years, the Inca plan was to achieve "the integration of the population, its distribution throughout the economic space of the country and achieve per capita income no less than the current one." These objectives had to be achieved in a purely Peruvian environment; for this reason the government declared its identity: "Neither capitalist nor Marxist-Leninist." Socialist self-management was partially made reference toand, as a form of government, popular democracy was made a slogan. In practice, it had an economy that has been described as ‘in transition to socialism’; made efforts to approach communist countries.

=== Achievements ===
Prior to the 1974 announcement of the plan, the following had been achieved by junta in the first six years of its rule:

- Takeover of Talara (October 9, 1968) and recovery of its oil fields.
- Planning and restructuring of the state apparatus.
- Central Reserve Bank: regulatory body for national credit.
- Strengthening of the Bank of the Nation.
- On July 24, 1969, the company Petróleos del Perú was created.
- Nationalization of private commercial banking.
- On November 2, 1969, the General Mining Law was approved. Then the company Minero Perú was founded.

== See also ==
- Vuskovic plan
