= List of ambassadors of Peru to Austria =

Ambassador of Peru to the Republic of Austria
- Great Seal of Peru
- Ministry of Foreign Affairs
- Appointer: The president of Peru
- Formation
- Website: Embassy of Peru in Austria

The extraordinary and plenipotentiary ambassador of Peru to the Republic of Austria is the official representative of the Republic of Peru to the Republic of Austria. The ambassador is also accredited to Slovakia and Slovenia.

Both countries established relations in the 19th century. In 1851, Austria–Hungary recognized the independence of Peru, and both countries subsequently established relations. By 1859, ethnic Germans from Austria and Germany established and founded the colony of Pozuzo.

As a result of World War I, Peru severed relations with both Germany and Austria–Hungary, reestablishing them with the First Austrian Republic after the war. After the incorporation of Austria into the German Reich in 1938, Peru ceased to have relations with Austria, instead continuing its relations with Germany until 1942. During this period, the Austrian population in Peru saw itself polarized between Austrian loyalists and National Socialists.

In 1947, Peru recognized the Republic of Austria, and in 1949, bilateral relations were resumed.

== List of representatives ==
=== Austria–Hungary (19th century–1917) ===
| Name | Portrait | Term begin | Term end | President | Notes |
|---|---|---|---|---|---|
| Carlos Matzenauer | | December 2, 1891 | ? | Remigio Morales Bermúdez | As consul-general in Vienna. |
| Carlos Larrabure y Correa | | 1909 | 1909 | Augusto B. Leguía | As Envoy Extraordinary and Minister Plenipotentiary. |
| Andrés Avelino Cáceres | | 1911 | April 14, 1914 | Augusto B. Leguía | As Envoy Extraordinary and Minister Plenipotentiary. |
| Alejandro Von der Heyde | | April 15, 1914 | 1917 | Augusto B. Leguía | As Envoy Extraordinary and Minister Plenipotentiary (ad honorem). |

=== Republic of Austria (1920–1938; 1947–2026) ===
| Name | Portrait | Term begin | Term end | President | Notes |
|---|---|---|---|---|---|
| Carlos Larrabure y Correa | | 1928 | 1929 | Augusto B. Leguía | As Envoy Extraordinary and Minister Plenipotentiary (ad honorem). |
| Manuel Mujica Gallo | | | 1968 | Fernando Belaúnde | Resigned due to the coup d'état that deposed Belaúnde. |
| Jorge Pablo Fernandini Malpartida | | 1972 | 1976 | Juan Velasco Alvarado | Accredited to Turkey. |
| Augusto Arzubiaga Rospigliosi | | 1981 | ? | Fernando Belaúnde | As Ambassador. |
| Javier Paulinich Velarde | | 2000 | 2004 | Alberto Fujimori | Ambassador, concurrent to Slovakia, Slovenia and Turkey. |
| Antonio Javier Alejandro García Revilla | | March 14, 2009 | June 28, 2013 | Alan García | As ambassador. |
| Raúl Chuquihuara Chil | | October 28, 2015 | August 12, 2016 | Ollanta Humala | As Ambassador, accredited to Slovenia and Hungary. |
| Juan Fernando Javier Rojas Samanez | | October 1, 2016 | May 30, 2018 | Pedro Pablo Kuczynski | As Ambassador. |
| Eric Edgardo Guillermo Anderson Machado | | August 18, 2018 | October 13, 2021 | Martín Vizcarra | As Ambassador, accredited to Slovakia and Slovenia. |
| Luis Alberto Campana Boluarte | | February 1, 2022 | 2026 | Pedro Castillo | As Ambassador. |

== See also ==
- List of ambassadors of Peru to Germany
- List of ambassadors of Austria to Peru
- List of ambassadors of Slovakia to Peru
