= Peruvian military junta =

1968–1980 authoritarian military dictatorship in Peru

Peruvian Republic (1968–1979) República Peruana Republic of Peru (1979–1980) República del Perú
- Flag Coat of arms
- Motto: "Firme y feliz por la unión" (Spanish) "Firm and Happy for the Union"
- Anthem: "Himno Nacional del Perú" (Spanish) "National Anthem of Peru" March: "Marcha de Banderas" (Spanish) "March of Flags"
- Capital: Lima
- Official languages: Spanish
- Recognised regional languages: Quechua (1975); Aymara (1977)
- Religion: Roman Catholic
- Demonym: Peruvian
- Government: Unitary presidential republic under a military dictatorship (Note: The first phase of the regime under Velasco has been described as corporatist, socialist leaning, and leftist with elements of workers' self-management and co-operatives. The regime also described itself as social democratic; claiming that it sought a “fully participatory social democracy.” The second phase of the regime under Morales Bermúdez undid these policies.)
- President
  - 1968–1975: Juan Velasco Alvarado
  - 1975–1980: Francisco Morales-Bermúdez

Establishment
- Historical era: Cold War
  - 1968 coup d'état: 3 October 1968
  - Agrarian reform: 24 June 1969
  - 1975 coup d'état: 29 August 1975
  - 1980 elections: 18 May 1980
- Currency: Sol de oro
- ISO 3166 code: PE
Preceded by	Succeeded by
Peruvian Republic	Republic of Peru

The Peruvian military junta, officially named the Revolutionary Government of the Armed Forces (Spanish: Gobierno Revolucionario de la Fuerza Armada), was a military dictatorship that ruled Peru from 1968 to 1980 after a successful coup d'état by the Peruvian Armed Forces, then led by Juan Velasco Alvarado. Velasco led the Revolutionary Junta, which promoted revolutionary nationalism and left-wing reforms across the country. Among the policies promoted were major agrarian reform, the official recognition of Quechua as a national language, an increase of worker's rights, and the empowerment of workers' unions and indigenous Peruvians. Other measures included the nationalization of natural resources and the expropriation of companies and the media.

As a result of the reforms, the economy went through a severe crisis and the country was subject to international isolation. In response, Velasco Alvarado was overthrown in 1975 by his prime minister Francisco Morales Bermúdez who took power to undo the socialist-leaning measures taken by his predecessor. In a shift from Velasco's close ties to the Eastern Bloc, Morales Bermúdez led the Peruvian military to participate in Operation Condor alongside other right-wing military dictatorships in South America. In 1978, the new government convened a Constituent Assembly, who wrote a new constitution in 1979 and proceeded with democratic elections in 1980. The dictatorship officially ended that same year, with Fernando Belaúnde returning to power after being deposed twelve years prior.

== Background ==
In the 1950s, several nationalist governments in Latin America began processes of social and economic modernization, promoting the economic theory of developmentalism, which promoted agrarian reforms, industrialization through import substitution and the use of income sourced from the exploitation of natural resources. Such was the case of the New National Ideology in Venezuela, the Bolivian Revolution of 1952, the second government of Carlos Ibáñez del Campo in Chile, the National Development Plan of Juscelino Kubitschek in Brazil, among others.

In Peru, the electoral victory in 1962 of Víctor Raúl Haya de la Torre, head of the Peruvian Aprista Party, was annulled by a coup. The APRA government program proposed a transformation of the country, betting on agrarian reform to end the servitude regime on the indigenous people that still existed on the haciendas. The Military Junta of 1962 called for new elections for the following year, in which Fernando Belaunde was victorious, who defeated Haya, with a government plan that also proposed to reform the country and establish new contracts on the exploitation of natural resources, especially oil.

Despite the determined support of the Armed Forces for the reforms promised by the new government, Belaúnde was unable to fulfill the promise of agrarian reform or to resolve the conflict over the ownership of Peruvian oil, among other reasons, due to the fierce parliamentary opposition from APRA and the right-wing Odriist National Union, led by Manuel Odría.

In addition, Belaúnde had to face the peasant mobilization in Cusco led by Hugo Blanco and the irruption of two guerrilla forces in the country inspired by the victory of the Cuban Revolution: the National Liberation Army (ELN) commanded by Héctor Béjar and Javier Heraud, and the Revolutionary Left Movement (MIR), led by an APRA militant, Luis de la Puente Uceda, and Guillermo Lobatón.

The Armed Forces, especially the Peruvian Army, quickly and forcefully defeated the ELN and MIR guerrillas. However, they realized the urgency of social and economic reforms in a country where there was still an oligarchic elite and huge marginalized groups of the poor and indigenous. Faced with the failure of the Belaundista reformism in democracy, the military decided to make the changes themselves with the idea of "starting the revolution from above to prevent it from being started from below."

== First phase ==
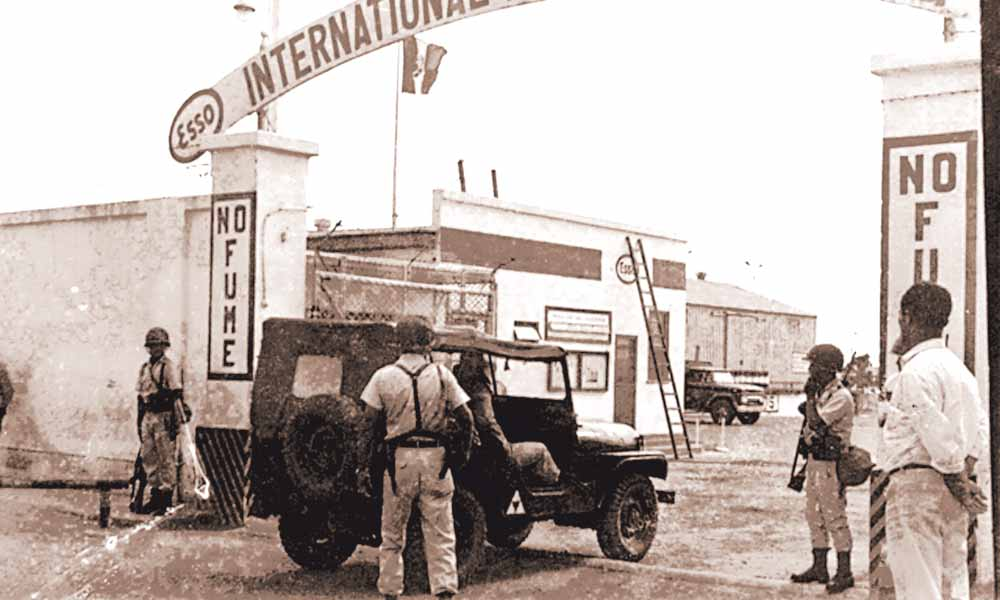
The Peruvian Army occupies La Brea y Pariñas

The first phase of the dictatorship, calling itself the Revolutionary Government of the Armed Forces, began with the de facto presidency of the Army Commander General, Major General Juan Velasco Alvarado, who overthrew President Fernando Belaúnde, after the Talara Act and the Page 11 scandals, through a coup d'état, on October 3, 1968. The coup was soon followed by the military takeover of La Brea y Pariñas oil complex on October 9, which helped the new government in its consolidation of power in the country.

Velasco's administration articulated a desire to give justice to the poor through a regime of nationalization and corporatism known as Peruanismo. Velasco's rule was characterized by left-leaning policies, which aimed to create a strong national industry to increase the international independence of Peru. To that end, he nationalised entire industries, expropriated companies in a wide range of activities from fisheries to mining to telecommunications to power production and consolidated them into single industry-centric government-run entities and increased government control over economic activity by enforcing those entities as monopolies and disincentivized private activity in those sectors. Most reforms were planned by left-leaning intellectuals of the time, and some of them successfully improved the Peruvian quality of life.

Among the state-owned companies created by the government were:

- PescaPeru: dedicated to the fishing industry.
- MineroPeru: dedicated to the mineral industry.
- PetroPerú: dedicated to the petroleum industry.
- SiderPerú: dedicated to the steel and iron industry.
- Centromin Perú: dedicated to the mining industry.
- ElectroPerú: dedicated to the electric power industry.
- Enapu: dedicated to the country's ports.
- EnatruPerú: dedicated to urban transport.
- Enafer: dedicated to rail transport.
- Compañía Peruana de Teléfonos: dedicated to telecommunications.
- EntelPerú: dedicated to telecommunications.
- Correos del Perú: dedicated to mail.

A root and branch education reform was in march looking to include all Peruvians and move them towards to a new national thinking and feeling; the poor and the most excluded were prioritized in this system and the name of the Peruvian Indian Day (Spanish: Día del Indio), celebrated every June 24, was changed to Peruvian Peasant's day (Spanish: Día del Campesino).

Velasco saw the revolution as one that was opposed to both capitalism and communism, stating in a 1970 address that

...neither the conceptual starting point, nor the process of our revolutionary development, nor the final objective of the Revolution obey the traditional molds of the capitalist or communist systems. Communism and capitalism are not the models of our Nationalist Revolution. The traditional order against which our Revolution insurged was a capitalist order and we know very well the deep roots of injustice that it contains because that was, precisely, the system under whose aegis we became a dependent and underdeveloped nation. But while it is true that the capitalist system, today harshly criticized by the Catholic Church as well, is open to insurmountable objections of an economic, ethical and social nature, from our point of view communism is also invalid for the reality of Peru and unacceptable for the humanist aims of our Revolution.

In 1971, the country celebrated its 150th anniversary since its independence. As a result, the Revolutionary Government established the National Commission for the Sesquicentennial of the Independence of Peru (Spanish: Comisión Nacional del Sesquicentenario de la Independencia del Perú (CNSIP)) to manage the celebrations.

The education reform of 1972 provided for bilingual education for the indigenous people of the Andes and the Amazon, which consisted nearly half of the population. In 1975, the Velasco government enacted a law making Quechua an official language of Peru equal to Spanish. Thus, Peru was the first Latin American country to officialize an indigenous language. However, this law was never enforced and ceased to be valid when the 1979 constitution became effective, according to which Quechua and Aymara are official only where they predominate, as mandated by law – a law that was never enacted.

Peruanismo was also characterized by authoritarianism, as the administration grew away from tolerating any level of dissent, periodically jailing, deporting and harassing suspected political opponents and repeatedly closing and censoring broadcast and print news media, finally expropriating all of the newspapers in 1974 and sending the publishers into exile.

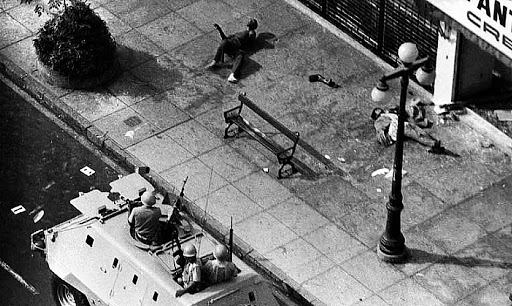
A tank drives past two wounded civilians during the Limazo

A cornerstone of Velasco's political and economic strategy was the implementation by dictate of an agrarian reform program to expropriate farms and diversify land ownership. In its first ten years in power, the Revolutionary Government of the Armed Forces (GRFA) expropriated 15,000 properties (totaling nine million hectares) and benefited some 300,000 families. The former landlords who opposed this program believed that they did not receive adequate compensation for their confiscated assets and lamented that the state officials and peasant beneficiaries mismanaged their properties after the expropriation.

On February 5, 1975, there was a police strike that generated riots and looting in the historic center of Lima, which created a massive increase of crime and general unrest in the capital and precipitated the fall of Velasco. This event would be later known as the Limazo. Months later, the Tacnazo occurred, a coup by which General Francisco Morales Bermúdez became de facto president on August 29, 1975, beginning the second phase of the Revolutionary Government.

== Second phase ==
Velasco Alvarado was overthrown in 1975 by his prime minister Francisco Morales Bermúdez, who overturned many of Velasco Alvarado's pro-Socialist reforms and joined Operation Condor. His government repressed the protests that surged as a result of inflation.

The Morales Bermudez administration assumed a country in a serious economic crisis after Velasco's reforms. The economy failed to improve amid rising inflation and recession, as well as rising unemployment. This situation led to high social discontent, where many people of the working class, particularly those closest to the labor unions, came to see in each government action a reversal of the military revolution towards submission to the International Monetary Fund, as it proved unable to continue with the original leftist military government program, instead continuing with Morales Bermudez's program, such as the replacement of the Inca Plan with the Tupac Amaru Plan.

Two general strikes were called by unions such as the Workers' General Confederation of Peru as a result of social discontent. The first strike was held on July 19, 1977, the objective of which was to demand an improvement in the employment and salary situation, and the second in May of the following year, with a broader list of claims.

Morales Bermudez was forced to call a Constitutional Assembly, which was led by Víctor Raúl Haya de la Torre, and new elections. The Revolutionary Government came to an end after Fernando Belaunde was reelected.

At the end of the military dictatorship, the growing problems with the payment of the foreign debt and the ineffectiveness of the State administration led to the appearance of symptoms of economic crisis and the incubation of social problems that in later years would increase.

== Art and culture ==
During the First Phase of the Revolutionary Government, there was a strong impulse of Peruvian cinema and literature. During this period, young Peruvian writers such as Mario Vargas Llosa, Alfredo Bryce Echenique and Julio Ramón Ribeyro, reached international recognition. In addition, important initiatives appeared that spread reading in Peru such as the Populibros Peruanos collection, which published more than seventy titles of universal and Peruvian literature, or the Peruvian Library of PEISA, which reissued books on history and current national affairs.

On the other hand, Peruvian cinema had a boom with indigenous themes thanks to the financing of the revolutionary government through the National Mobilization Support System (SINAMOS). Movies such as Runan Caycu (1973) by Nora de Izcue and the docudrama Kuntur Wachana (1977) by Federico García Hurtado stand out.

Logo of the SINAMOS

The Peruvian plastic arts were also influenced by the Peruvian revolution, the Directorate for the Promotion and Diffusion of the Agrarian Reform sponsored the birth of artist Jesús Ruiz Durand's achorado pop. Ruiz created posters, logos and even comics where the peasant, the worker and the Indigenous people are protagonists, taking the aesthetics of pop art and representing the "achorado" Peruvian Indian as a synonym of defiance and insolence.

== Foreign relations ==
In foreign policy, in contrast with his 1970s Latin American contemporaries, which were mostly right-wing military dictatorships, Velasco pursued a partnership with communist countries, beginning with Czechoslovakia and Yugoslavia. By 1969 he established warm relations with the Soviet bloc, tightening relations with Cuba and Fidel Castro as well as Romania and Nicolae Ceaușescu and undertaking major purchases of Soviet military hardware.

Velasco was greatly influenced by socialist Yugoslavia's policies of self-management and worked with Yugoslav economist Edvard Kardelj to help implement similar policies in Peru. Yugoslavia aided the Junta financially and diplomatically, and the two nations remained close allies.

Relations between Peru and Chile were tense, as it was believed that one of Juan Velasco Alvarado's main goals was to militarily reconquer the lands lost by Peru to Chile in the War of the Pacific. This, as well as Peru's purchases of military equipment from the Soviet Union were also cause for concern. Nevertheless, both countries never went to war.

Relations between the United States and Peru were tense and even hostile, as soon as General Velasco and his junta took power. This was due to the government's socialist-leaning policies, but also because of a belief on the part of the Peruvian public that the U.S. generally favored other nations first, such as Chile in the context of their territorial dispute (in spite of its support of Peru over the Tarata dispute), or Colombia, in the context of the United States' mediation in favor of the Salomon-Lozano Treaty in order to compensate the country for its loss of Panama.

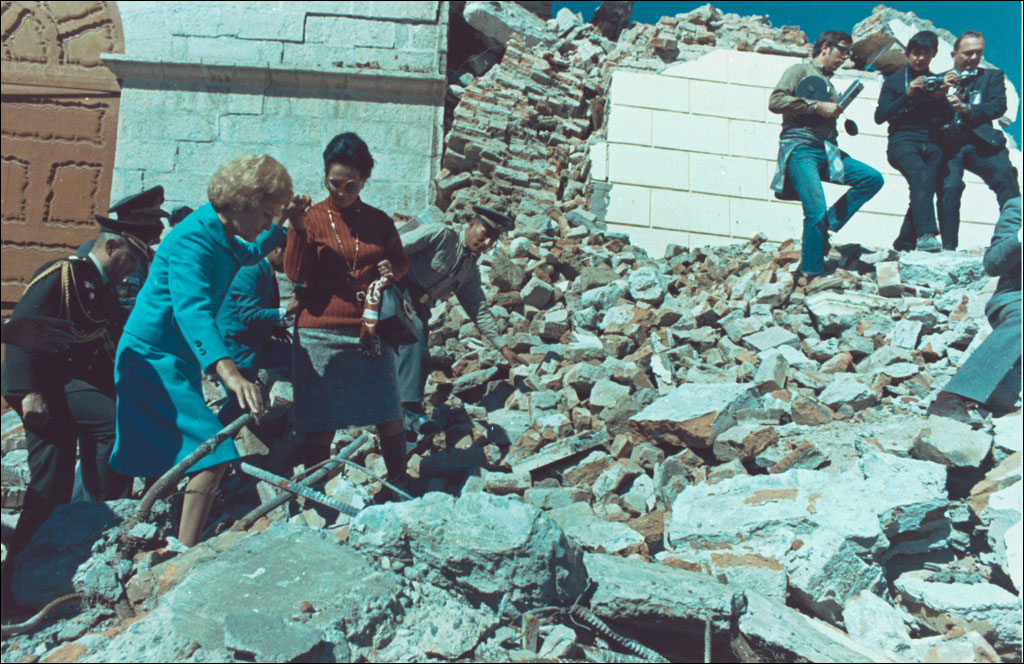
U.S. First Lady Pat Nixon, seen here with first lady Consuelo Velasco, led American aid efforts after the 1970 earthquake, distributing relief supplies as well as visiting hospitals.

Just five days after Velasco seized power in 1968, the General began the nationalization of the Peruvian Economy with the expropriation and nationalization of the American International Petroleum Company (IPC) oil fields located in the northern Peruvian oil port and refinery of Talara, Piura, near the Peruvian border with Ecuador, Piura being the region where Velasco was born. IPC was a subsidiary of Standard Oil, and although the claims over the IPC were ultimately resolved in negotiations between the two governments, the US after this seizure no longer considered Peru an ally or a friendly country. Instead, the CIA started to organize plans to destabilize and to overthrow General Velasco.

Disagreements between the United States and Peru continued over a broad range of issues including even Peru's claim to a 200-nautical-mile (370 km) fishing limit that resulted in the seizure of several US commercial fishing boats and the expropriation of the American copper mining company Cerro de Pasco Corporation.

However, in spite of these provocations, the U.S. responded immediately with humanitarian aid in 1970, when an earthquake killed about 50,000 people and left over 600,000 homeless.

== Military ==
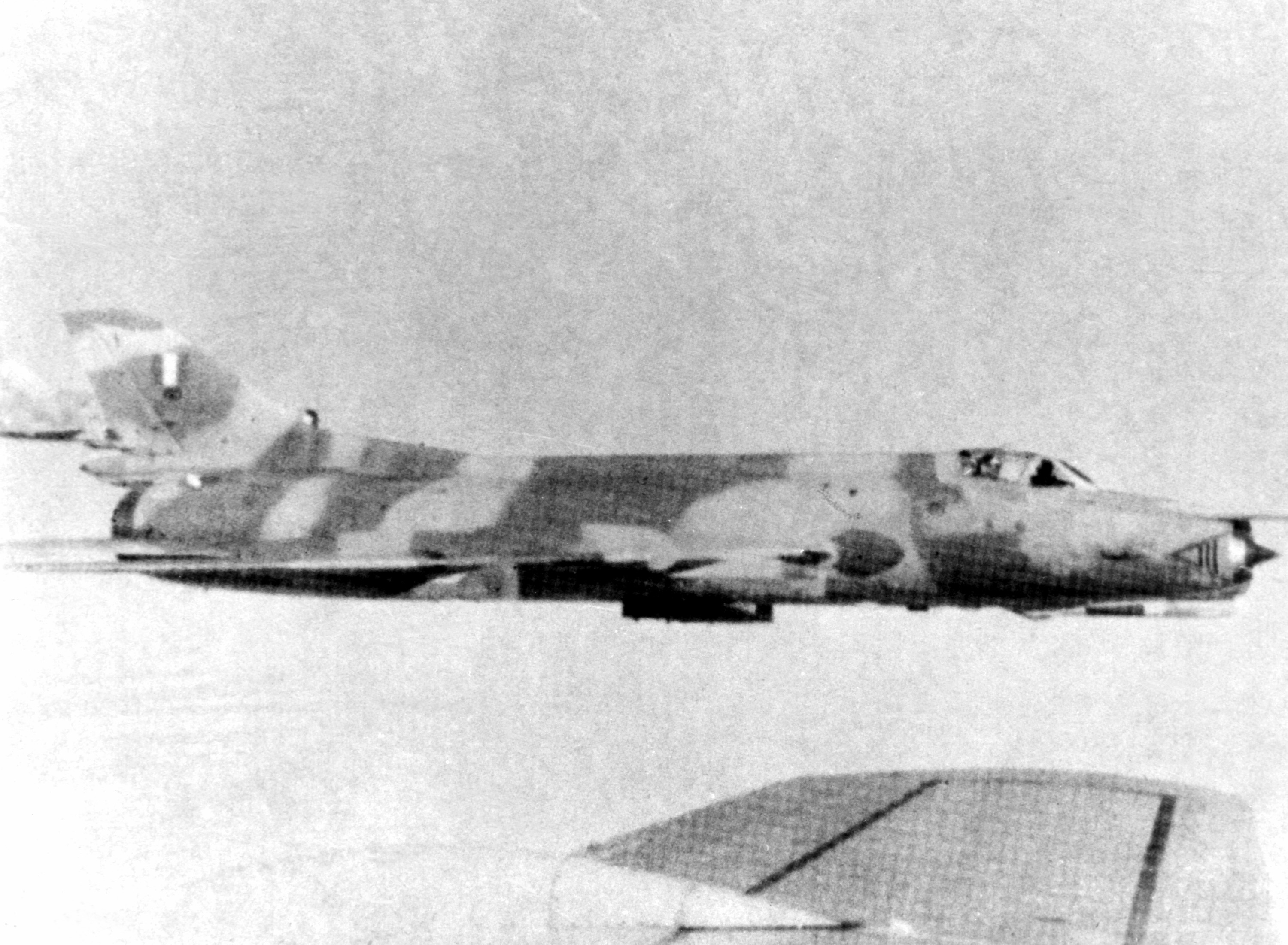
Sukhoi Su-22 "Fitter F" aircraft of the Peruvian Air Force.

Velasco's military was one of the strongest in Latin America. It consisted of the Peruvian Army, Peruvian Air Force and the Peruvian Navy.

It is estimated that from 1970 to 1975 Peru spent up to US$2 billion (roughly US$20 billion in 2010's valuation) on Soviet armament. According to various sources Velasco's government bought between 600 and 1,200 T-55 Main Battle Tanks, APCs, 60 to 90 Sukhoi 22 warplanes, 500,000 assault rifles, and even considered the purchase of the British Centaur-class light fleet carrier HMS Bulwark.

The Peruvian Army had 1,200 units in total raging from T-55 Main Battle Tanks and APCs. The Peruvian Air Force had 90 Sukhoi 22 warplanes for combat and Antonov An-26 and An-32 transport aircraft, as well as Mil Mi-8, Mi-17, Mi-25 and Mi-26 helicopters. The Peruvian Navy's flagship was the cruiser BAP Almirante Grau received from the Netherlands. The Peruvian Navy mirrored that of Chile.

The enormous amount of weaponry purchased by Peru caused a meeting between former US Secretary of State Henry Kissinger and Augusto Pinochet in 1976. Velasco's military plan was to launch a massive sea, air, and land invasion against Chile. In 1999, General Pinochet claimed that if Peru had attacked Chile during 1973 or even 1978, Peruvian forces could have penetrated deep south into Chilean territory, possibly even taking the Chilean city of Copiapó located halfway to Santiago. The Chilean Armed Forces considered launching a preventive war to defend itself. Though, Pinochet's Chilean Air Force General Fernando Matthei opposed a preventive war and responded that "I can guarantee that the Peruvians would destroy the Chilean Air Force in the first five minutes of the war". Some analysts believe the fear of attack by Chilean and US officials as largely unjustified but logical for them to experience, considering the Pinochet dictatorship had come into power with a coup against democratically elected president Salvador Allende. According to sources, the alleged invasion scheme could be seen from the Chilean's government perspective as a plan for some kind of leftist counterattack. While acknowledging that the Peruvian plans were revisionist, scholar Kalevi J. Holsti claimed that the more important issues behind them were the "ideological incompatibility" between the regimes of Velasco Alvarado and Pinochet and that Peru would have been concerned about Pinochet's geopolitical views on Chile's need of naval hegemony in the Southeastern Pacific.

Chileans should stop with the bullshit or tomorrow I shall eat breakfast in Santiago.

—Juan Velasco Alvarado

== See also ==
- Cold War
