= List of ambassadors of Peru to Bulgaria =

Ambassador of Peru to the Republic of Bulgaria
- Great Seal of Peru
- Ministry of Foreign Affairs
- Appointer: The president of Peru
- Inaugural holder: José Canesa
- Formation: June 1970

The extraordinary and plenipotentiary ambassador of Peru to the Republic of Bulgaria is the official representative of the Republic of Peru to the Republic of Bulgaria.

Peru had an embassy in Sofia until 2003. As of 2023, the ambassador to Greece is also accredited to Bulgaria.

== List of representatives ==
Name	Portrait	Term begin	Term end	President	Notes
José Canesa		June 1970	1972	Juan Velasco Alvarado	As chargé d'affaires (a.i.).
Jose Luis De Cossio		March 22, 1972	1974	Juan Velasco Alvarado	As ambassador.
Félix Álvarez Brun		May 21, 1974	1977	Juan Velasco Alvarado	As ambassador.
Raúl María Pereira Veintemilla		March 11, 1977	1978	Francisco Morales Bermúdez	As ambassador.
Jorge Perez Garot		September 14, 1978	1980	Francisco Morales Bermúdez	As ambassador.
Abraham Padilla Bendezu		May 12, 1980	1984	Francisco Morales Bermúdez	As ambassador.
José Felipe Coz Botteri		February 21, 1984	1988	Fernando Belaúnde	As ambassador.
Julio Vega Erausquin		March 16, 1988	1992	Alan García	As ambassador.
Jesús Cristobal Carranza Quiñones		February 26, 1994	1998	Alberto Fujimori	As chargé d'affaires (a.i.).
Rosa Esther Silva y Silva		June 1998	2001	Alberto Fujimori	As chargé d'affaires (a.i.).
Aurelio José Pinto-Bazurco Rittler		2001	2002	Alejandro Toledo	As chargé d'affaires (a.i.).
Pedro Rubín Heraud		2002	2003	Alejandro Toledo	As chargé d'affaires (a.i.).
Héctor Matallana Martinez		2003	2003	Alejandro Toledo	As chargé d'affaires (a.i.). Last resident ambassador before the accreditation from Belgrade.

== See also ==
- List of ambassadors of Bulgaria to Peru
- List of ambassadors of Peru to Yugoslavia
