= List of ambassadors of Peru to Greece =

Ambassador of Peru to the Hellenic Republic of Greece
- Great Seal of Peru
- Ministry of Foreign Affairs
- Appointer: The president of Peru
- Inaugural holder: Alberto Wagner de Reyna
- Formation: 1966
- Website: Embassy of Peru in Greece

The extraordinary and plenipotentiary ambassador of Peru to the Hellenic Republic of Greece is the official representative of the Republic of Peru to the Hellenic Republic.

As of 2023, the ambassador to Greece is also accredited to Albania and Bulgaria. The former was accredited from Yugoslavia until its dissolution, and the latter had an embassy in Sofia until 2003.

Both countries established relations in 1965, which have continued since. Peru opened an embassy in 1987, located in Athens.

== List of representatives ==
Name	Portrait	Term begin	Term end	President	Notes
Alberto Wagner de Reyna		1966	1968	Fernando Belaúnde	First ambassador to Greece, accredited from Paris.
Alberto Wagner de Reyna		1969	1972	Juan Velasco Alvarado	As ambassador; accredited from Bonn.
Arturo García García		1973	?	Juan Velasco Alvarado	As ambassador; accredited from Rome.
Edgardo de Habich		1986	1992	Alan García	As first ambassador in Athens.
Alberto Tamayo		1993	after 1994	Alberto Fujimori	As ambassador.
Luis Felipe Galvez Villarroel		2004	2010		As ambassador
Jorge Eduardo Román Morey		2013	2016	Ollanta Humala	As ambassador.
Luis Sandoval Dávila		2017	2020	Pedro Pablo Kuczynski	As ambassador.
Javier Raul Martin Yepez Verdeguer		February 15, 2022	2026	Pedro Castillo	As ambassador.

== See also ==
- List of ambassadors of Greece to Peru
- List of ambassadors of Peru to Italy
- List of ambassadors of Peru to Yugoslavia
