= Coat of arms of Peru =

Versions
- The coat of arms (Escudo de armas) as used in the center of the national flag.
- Armiger: Republic of Peru
- Adopted: 25 February 1825
- Crest: Holm oak civic crown
- Shield: Per fess, the first per pale azure and argent in dexter a vicuña counter-statant proper and in sinister a cinchona tree also proper, the second gules, a cornucopia spilling coins Or
- Supporters: Two national flags of Peru and two standards on each side.
- Other elements: When used on the National Flag, the Coat of arms (Escudo de armas) is surrounded by a wreath of palm branch one on the left and a laurel one on the right tied by a red and white ribbon.

The coat of arms of the Republic of Peru (Spanish: Escudo del Perú) is the national symbolic emblem of Peru. Four variants are used: the coat of arms per se, the National Coat of Arms (or the National Shield), the Great Seal of the State, and the Naval Coat of Arms.

== Official description ==
Peruvian law describes the coat of arms as follows:

"The arms of the Peruvian Nation shall consist of a shield divided into three fields: one celestial blue to the left, with a vicuna looking inside; other white to the right, with a Cinchona officinalis placed within, and another, red, in the bottom and smaller, with a cornucopia pouring coins, signifying with these symbols the treasures of Peru in the three realms of nature. The coat of arms shall be surmounted by a civic crown in flat view; and accompanied on each side by a flag and a standard of national colors, further described below."

== Variants ==
=== The coat of arms ===
The coat of arms (escudo de armas) has a palm branch on its left and a laurel one on its right, tied by a red and white ribbon, as well as a holm oak civic crown above it. These represent victory and glory. This variant is used on the national ensign (Pabellón Nacional) or state flag. Its use on its own is infrequent, except on currency, both on coins and bills, and stamps.

=== The National Coat of Arms ===
The National Coat of Arms, or National Shield (Escudo Nacional), consists of the shield plus a Peruvian flag and a standard on each side, and a Civic Crown as crest. It is used on the war flag (Bandera de Guerra). Its use on its own is mandated for all public buildings, with the name of the entity under it.

=== The Great Seal of the State ===
The Great Seal of the State (Gran Sello del Estado), consisting of the National Shield and the semicircular inscription "República del Perú" ('Republic of Peru') above it, is used on official documents.

=== The Naval Coat of Arms ===
The Naval Coat of Arms (Escudo de la Marina de Guerra), consists of the National Shield and the semicircular inscription Marina de Guerra del Peru, along with anchors instead of the traditional flags it is embedded upon, as well as having an image of the sun as the crest. It is used for various naval purposes.

== History ==
=== First version ===
First version (1821–1825)

The first version of the Coat of Arms of Peru was designed by General José de San Martín and officially declared on 21 October 1820. It consisted of a landscape of Inti, the sun rising from the Andes, seen from the sea, and escorted by laurel branches tied with a golden ribbon.

In the shield, on a blue sky background, the sun's yellow rays can be seen behind the dark brown mountains rising above the blue and green ocean.

The flags of the South American nations and a banana tree can be seen behind the shield. A condor on the left and a llama on the right act as supporters.

This was on top of a baroque base, with a scroll under it with the motto "Renació el sol del Perú" ("Peru's sun is reborn") in capital letters. Some flowers, branches and ammunition were on the base.

=== Second version ===
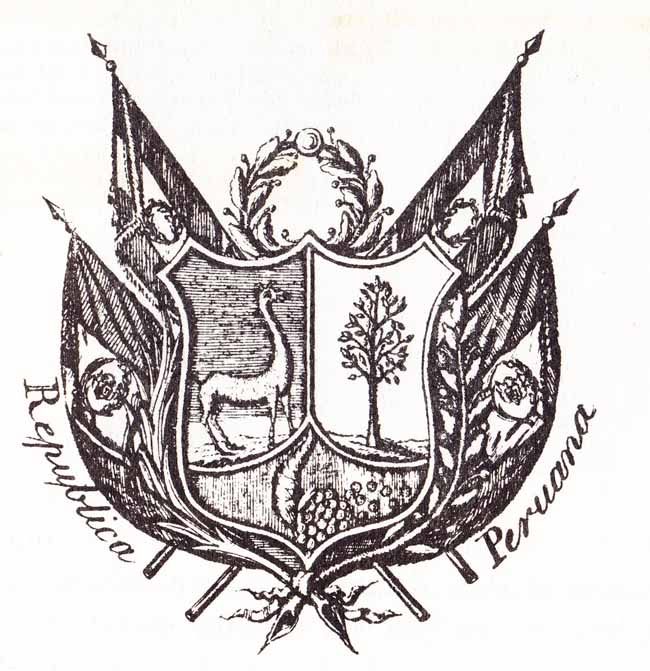
Second version (1825–1836, 1839–1950)

Third Coat of Arms until 1950.

On 25 February 1825, Simón Bolívar and the Constituent Congress proclaimed a law defining the new national symbols. establishing the new Coat of Arms, similar to the one used today. This was designed by Congressmen José Gregorio Paredes and Francisco Javier Cortés. The official description was the following:

"Las armas de la Nación Peruana constarán de un escudo dividido en tres campos (forma polaca), uno azul celeste, a la derecha, que llevará una vicuña mirando al interior; otro blanco, a la izquierda, donde se colocará el árbol de la quina; y otro rojo inferior y más pequeño en que se verá una cornucopia derramando monedas, significándose con estos símbolos, las preciosidades del Perú en los tres reinos naturales. El escudo tendrá por timbre una corona cívica vista de plano; e irá acompañada en cada lado de una bandera y un estandarte de los colores nacionales, señalado más adelante."

"The arms of the Peruvian Nation shall consist of a shield divided into three fields (Polish shape), one light-blue, to the left, which will carry a vicuña looking inwards; another white, on the right, where a cinchona tree will be located; and another red below and smaller in which a cornucopia will be seen spilling coins, signifying with these symbols, the richnesses of Peru in the three natural kingdoms. The shield shall have as crest a Civic Crown seen flat; and shall be escorted on each side by a flag and standard of the same national colors, described later."

==== Within the Peru-Bolivia Confederation ====
Coat of arms of South Peru.

Coat of arms of North Peru.

From 1836 to 1839, Peru was temporarily dissolved into the Republics of South Peru and North Peru, which joined Bolivia to form the Peru–Bolivian Confederation.

The South was formed first, thus adopting a new coat of arms: A golden inti sun with five small stars above it (representing Arequipa, Ayacucho, Cuzco, Litoral and Puno, the four groups of the republic) and four flags behind it. The North used a variant version of the original coat of arms.

After the dissolution of the Confederation, the old Republic of Peru was restored to its 1836 composition, as were its national symbols.

==== 1950 modification ====
This is the coat of arms used today and is a modification of the second version. Until 1950, the coat of arms was a symbol of both the nation and the state, and presented some difficulties in its design. These generated that, months after its creation, that the seals of ministries modified the law, cutting the width of the shield to design the cornucopia comfortably, and getting rid of the escorting flags.

The last modification was in March 1950, during General Manuel A. Odría’s administration. In this way, the coat of arms was split in halves, and the lower section became the largest, rather than the smallest. The national coat of arms was created simultaneously as a heraldic symbol of the State.

Great Seal of the State
Gran Sello del Estado

Coat of arms
Escudo del Ejército del Perú

Naval Coat of arms
Escudo de la Marina de Guerra del Perú

Coat of arms
Escudo de la Fuerza Aérea del Perú

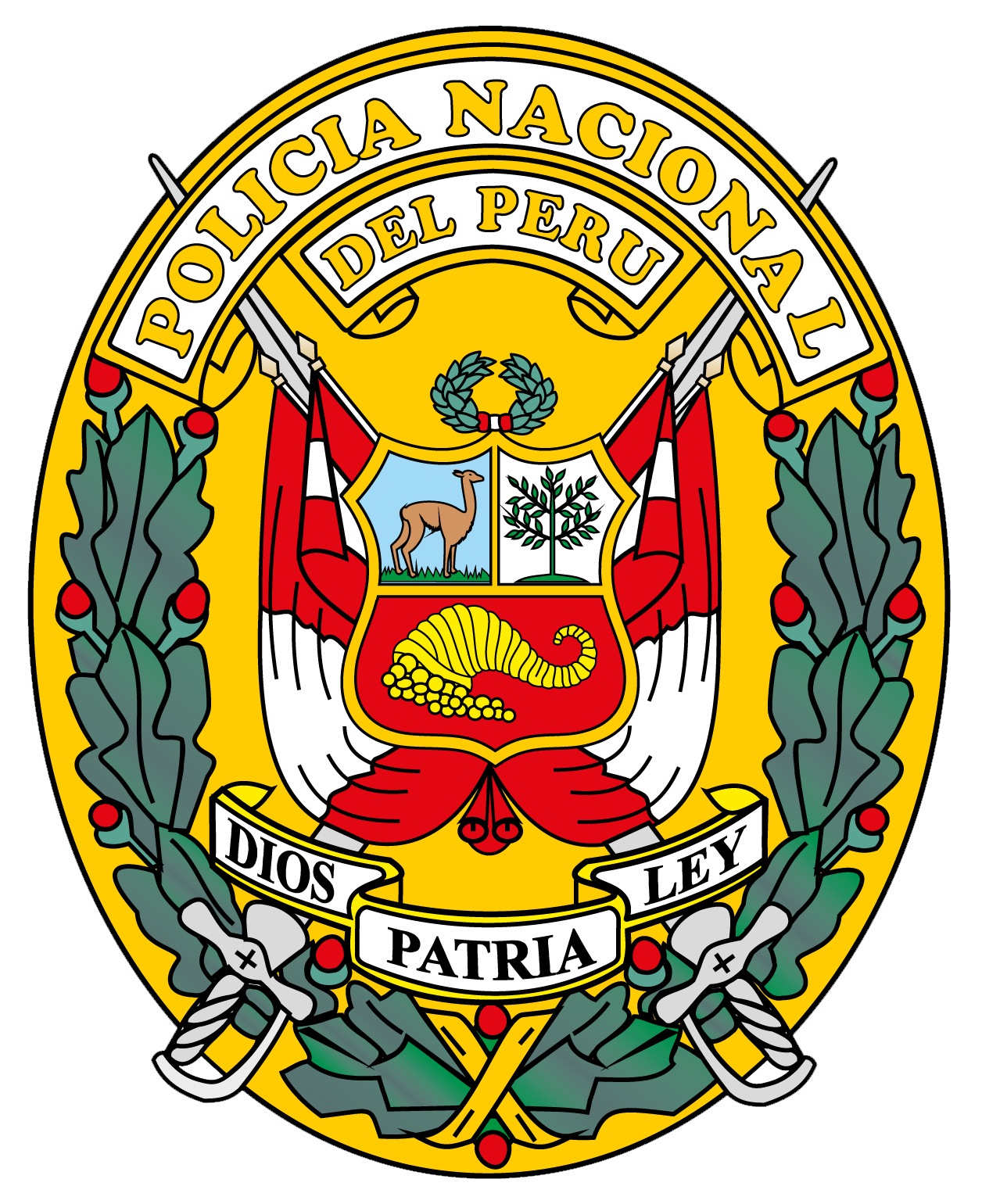
Policial Coat of arms
Escudo de la Policía Nacional del Perú

== See also ==
- Flag of Peru
