= Day of National Dignity =

Former holiday in Peru

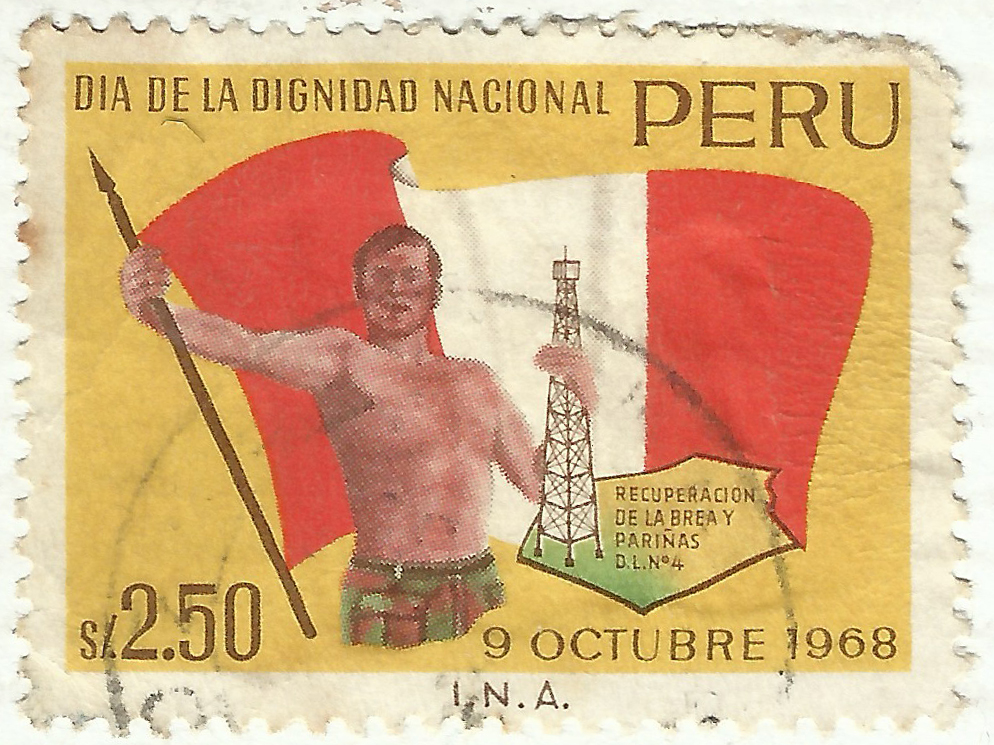
- Conmemorative stamp
- Observed by: Peru (until 1980)
- Significance: Expropriation of La Brea y Pariñas by the Revolutionary Government
- Date: 9 October
- First time: 9 October 1968
- Related to: Revolutionary Government of the Armed Forces

The Day of National Dignity was a holiday that was celebrated in Peru every October 9 in commemoration of the capture of La Brea and Pariñas by the so-called Revolutionary Government of the Armed Forces, a military junta that controlled the country from 1968 to 1980.

== History ==
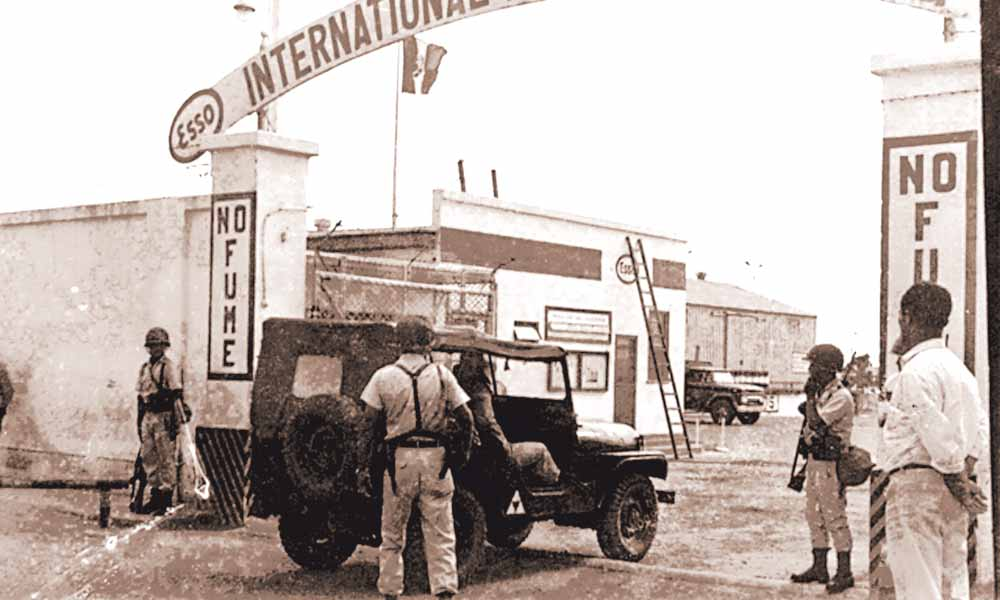
The Peruvian Army occupies La Brea y Pariñas

On October 9, 1968, the government of General Juan Velasco Alvarado emerged six days earlier by a coup against President Fernando Belaúnde, decided to solve the controversy surrounding the La Brea and Pariñas complex by nationalising the oil industry. Through Decree Law No. 417066 and the military deployment of the First Military Region based in Piura, the government of the so-called Peruvian Revolution took the oil fields and the Talara refinery, in the hands of the International Petroleum Company (IPC). The government expropriated the assets of the US company and expelled it from the country, although the IPC was later compensated.

The seizure of the facilities was officially announced the same day by a recorded message to the nation. The government officially baptized the date as the Day of National Dignity. With this action, the Revolutionary Government established itself in power and reoriented state policy towards the restitution of national sovereignty at the economic level and the recovery of oil for the interests of the nation.

After the Tacnazo of 1975 led by General Francisco Morales Bermúdez, the date fell out of use. The celebration was finally withdrawn from the national civic calendar when democracy was restored with the 1980 elections.

=== Use in Talara ===
The holiday continues to be celebrated today, known in Talara as the Day of the Oil Worker, where the date is commemorated with a Te Deum mass and a procession of the Peruvian flag and the Talara flag.

== See also ==
- La Brea and Pariñas
- First presidency of Fernando Belaúnde
