= First presidency of Fernando Belaúnde =

Peruvian government from 1963-1968

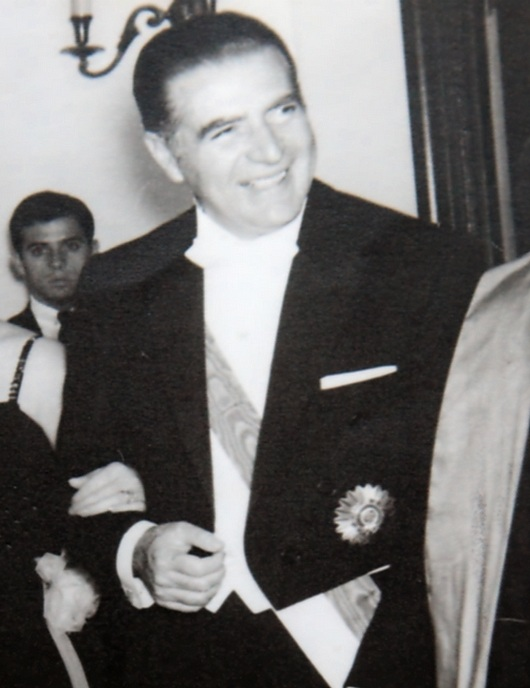
- First presidency of Fernando Belaúnde; July 28, 1963 – October 3, 1968
- Vice President: Mario Polar Ugarteche; Edgardo Seoane

The first term of Fernando Belaúnde Terry started July 28, 1963 and culminated in the coup Juan Velasco Alvarado on October 3, 1968.

== Inauguration ==
The presidency started on July 28, 1963. At Belaúnde's inauguration in the Legislative Palace, the President of the Senate, Julio de la Piedra gave him the presidential sash, followed by, the first vice president Edgardo Seoane's oath. The ceremony was attended by representatives of 41 states, among them being the Minister of Information and Tourism of Spain, Manuel Fraga. He gave an address to the nation, which announced government measures such as holding election councilors to make direct democracy for Peru. He also announced a housing plan to meet thousands of Peruvians homeless and also as an engine of development of the economy. Another important announcement was the start of a road traffic plan that would give birth to the Marginal Highway.

== Presidency ==
During his tenure there were some peasant uprisings and guerrilla outbreaks in Andean areas affected by poverty and oppression of the landlords and quickly suppressed with the help of the army. Also during the early years of his administration, it experienced a period of remarkable economic boom, which was reflected in the performance of a number of large infrastructure projects designed to improve the existing left by his predecessors Manuel A. Odría and Manuel Prado Ugarteche, but financed mainly on foreign loans.

=== Controversy ===
Upon assuming the presidency, Belaúnde offered to solve the problem of La Brea and Pariñas in 90 days. This was an embarrassing lawsuit for the nation and unresolved several decades, was that the American International Petroleum Company, that had been illegally exploiting the oilfields of La Brea and Pariñas, located in the north of Peru, without providing the amount owed to the Treasury, which had been accumulating over the years.

Belaúnde sent Congress a bill to declare null the Agreement and Award Paris Convention (signed in time Augusto B. Leguia and favoring IPC) and requested that the fields of La Brea and Pariñas pass to Power of Attorney Oil Company (government agency). Congress gave the Law No. 14,696, which declared invalid the Award, but did not rule on the second point. The Executive Branch enacted the law on November 4, 1963, is hereby authorized to seek a solution to the old problem.

In July 1968, under pressure from the economic power groups, treatment began with the IPC at the Government Palace. On August 13, it was signed on Act of Talara by which all oil fields passed into the hands of the Fiscal Petroleum Company (EPF), while retaining the refinery, the distribution system and fuel national Concessions calls Lima. The IPC was required to purchase all the oil that the EPF would like to sell, for processing at its refinery in Talara obsolete.

The Act was signed by President Belaúnde, the President of the Senate Carlos Manuel Cox and the Speaker of the Chamber of Deputies Andrés Townsend Ezcurra and the high officials of the IPC. All press echoed this event and published on the front page to the "Problem of Brea and Pariñas" exploding throughout Peru in joy.

However, public opinion changed when a section of the press announced that it had imposed conditions to the IPC Act for the signing scandal. The highlight came when the EPF president, engineer Carlos Loret de Mola, resigned and reported a missing page in the contract that had set the price of crude oil for purchase from EPF (September 10, 1968). That was the famous "Page 11" that would serve as a pretext for a group of army officers to give a coup less than a month later, accusing the government of "betrayal".

About "page 11" has been written extensively in Peru. Some attributed great importance because, apparently, contained valuable information on costs, others argued that it was only a blank page and there were even some who denied their existence.

On October 1, 1963, Oswaldo Hercelles García resigned as Prime Minister of Peru, and the next day, Fernando Belaúnde sworn in a new cabinet headed by Miguel Mujica Gallo as Prime Minister.

== Matsés massacre ==
In 1964 a set of military bombings carried out by the state of Peru against Matsés (also known as 'Mayoruna') communities in the northeast of the country. The number of deaths and injuries is unknown.

== Military coup ==
In October 1968, Belaúnde was deposed by a military junta in reaction to outcry over an agreement an American company, International Petroleum Company, for development of oil fields in northern Peru. He was overthrown by a group of socialist-leaning military, led by General Juan Velasco Alvarado, at the time President of the Joint Command of the Armed Forces of Peru.

At the dawn of October 3, 1968, the approach of the three army tanks arrived to the main square. From the Government Palace, Fernando Belaúnde called the ministers of War, Navy and Aeronautics and asked them to take more drastic measures. The army broke the gates and entered the Government Palace, then a group of soldiers under Commander Enrique Gallegos arrived at the rooms and they drove Belaúnde to a truck that brought him to the Armored Division Headquarters. Other tanks took the place of Congress, the prefecture, the headquarters of the political parties, the National Radio, the Ministry of Interior and TV stations.

At 5 am the cabinet met in the Palace of Torre Tagle without the Ministers of War and Navy. It was agreed that the Second Vice President of Peru Mario Polar should take office and was raised a dismiss to all officers from the coup. At 6:00, police officers surrounded the Palace of Torre Tagle and then burst into it. The ministers left the room singing the National Anthem. Meanwhile at the airport was ready to leave a plane that the military rebels had prepared to escape on it in case the coup failed, or deport President Belaúnde if triumphed.

At 8 am arrived President Belaúnde was guarded by 3 officers and 20 investigators, who forced him to board the plane. The deposed president was taken to Ezeiza International Airport, Argentina.

Juan Velasco Alvarado, then President of the Joint Command of the Armed Forces of Peru, introduced himself as the President of the Revolutionary Government of the Armed Forces. He accused the government of colluding with the interests of international capital and not having the will to carry out social reforms that were considered necessary.

== Cabinet ==
Ministry	Ministers
Prime Minister	Julio Óscar Trelles Montes; Fernando Schwalb López Aldana; Daniel Becerra de la Flor; Edgardo Seoane Corrales; Raúl Ferrero Rebagliati; Oswaldo Hercelles García; Miguel Mujica Gallo
Foreign Relations	Fernando Schwalb López Aldana; Jorge Vásquez Salas; Edgardo Seoane Corrales; Raúl Ferrero Rebagliati; Oswaldo Hercelles García; Miguel Mujica Gallo
Agriculture and Food	Enrique Torres Llosa; Victor Ganoza Plaza; Javier Silva Ruete; Carlos Fernández Sesarego; Rafael Cubas Vinatea; Javier Silva Ruete; Eduardo Villa Salcedo; Fernando Calmell del Solar; Orlando Olcese Pachas; Federico Uranga Bustos
Labour	Miguel Angel Cussianovich Valderrama; Frank Griffiths Escardó; Miguel Dammert Muelle; Manuel Velarde Aspíllaga; Fernando Calmell del Solar; Alfonso Grados Bertorini
Finance and Commerce	Javier Salazar Villanueva; Carlos Morales Macchiavello; Sandro Mariátegui Chiappe; Tulio de Andrea Marcazzolo; Raúl Ferrero Rebagliati; Francisco Morales Bermúdez; Manuel Ulloa Elías
Development and Public Works	Carlos Pestana Zevallos; Carlos Morales Macchiavello; Gastón Acurio Velarde; Enrique Tola Mendoza; Sixto Gutiérrez Chamorro; Pablo Carriquiry Maurer; Carlos Morales Macchiavello
Public Health and Social Welfare	Javier Arias Stella; Daniel Becerra de la Flor; Javier Arias Stella; Javier Correa Miller
Justice and Cult	Luis Bedoya Reyes; Emilio Llosa Ricketts; Carlos Fernández Sesarego; Valentín Paniagua Corazao; Roberto Ramírez del Villar Beaumont; Javier de Belaúnde Ruiz de Somocurcio; Luis Rodríguez Mariátegui Proaño; José Morales Urresti; Luis Lazarte Ferreyros; Guillermo Hoyos Osores; Elías Mendoza Habersperger
Public Education	Francisco Miró Quesada Cantuarias; Ernesto Montagne Sánchez; Carlos Cueto Fernandini; José Navarro Grau; Carlos Cueto Fernandini; Enrique Tola Mendoza; Octavio Mongrut Muñoz; José Jiménez Borja
Government and Police	Julio Óscar Trelles Montes; Juan Languasco de Habich; Miguel Rotalde de Romaña; Octavio Mongrut Muñoz; Javier Alva Orlandini; Luis Alayza Escardó; Luis Ponce Arenas; Carlos Velarde Cabello; Manuel Velarde Aspíllaga
Aeronautics	Carlos Granthon Cardona; José Heighes Pérez Albela; José Gagliardi Schiaffino
Navy	Florencio Texeira Vela; Luis Ponce Arenas; Raúl Delgado Espantoso; Jorge Luna Ferrecio
War	Julio Humberto Luna Ferrecio; Italo Arbulú Samamé; Julio Doig Sánchez; Roberto Dianderás Chumbiauca
