= Consuelo Gonzales Posada =

Consuelo Gonzáles Posada
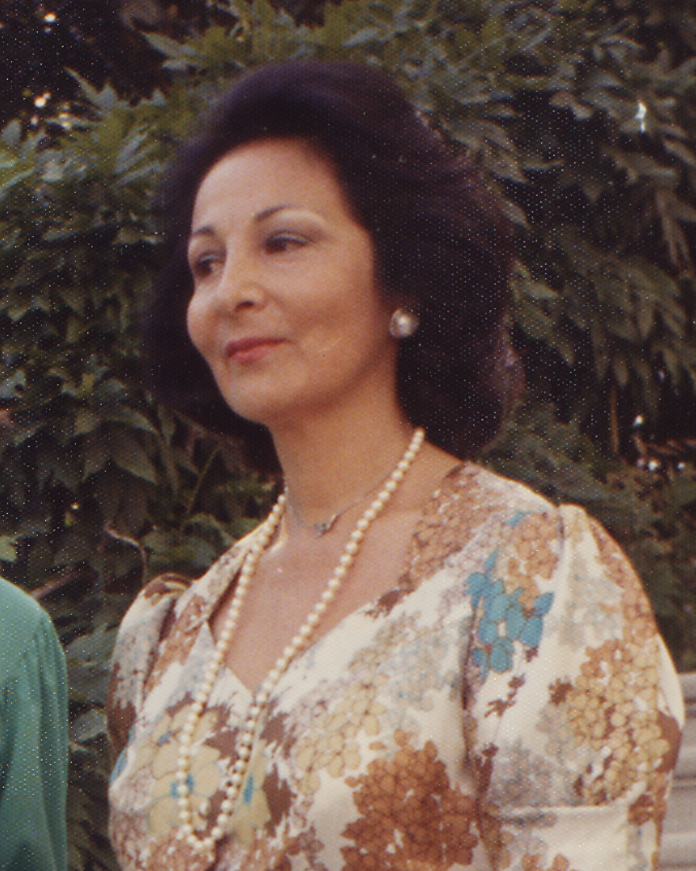
- Velasco during a visit to the White House in 1975

First Lady of Peru
- In Role; October 3, 1968 – August 29, 1975
- President: Juan Velasco Alvarado
- Preceded by: Carolina Belaúnde Aubry
- Succeeded by: Rosa Pedraglio

Personal details
- Born: María Consuelo Gonzáles-Posada Arriola de Velasco; June 12, 1920 Ica, Peru
- Died: September 7, 2012 (aged 92) Lima, Peru
- Spouse: Juan Velasco Alvarado (m. 1940; died 1977)
- Occupation: First Lady of Peru
- Nickname(s): Chola; Mother of the Peruvian Revolution

María Consuelo Gonzáles-Posada Arriola de Velasco (June 18, 1920 – September 7, 2012) was a socialite and First Lady of Peru, as the wife of General Juan Velasco Alvarado, between October 3, 1968, and August 29, 1975, in the so-called Revolutionary Government of the Armed Forces of Peru.

== Biography ==
Gonzáles was the daughter of the lawyer and APRA militant Carlos Gonzáles Posada and María Herminia Arriola Vásquez. She was a sister on the paternal side of the Aprista politician Luis Gonzales Posada. Together with her sister, the future congresswoman Bertha Gonzáles Posada, they were known by the Peruvian social press as "the Gonzáles", she was nicknamed the "Chola" and her sister the "Coca".

=== First Lady ===
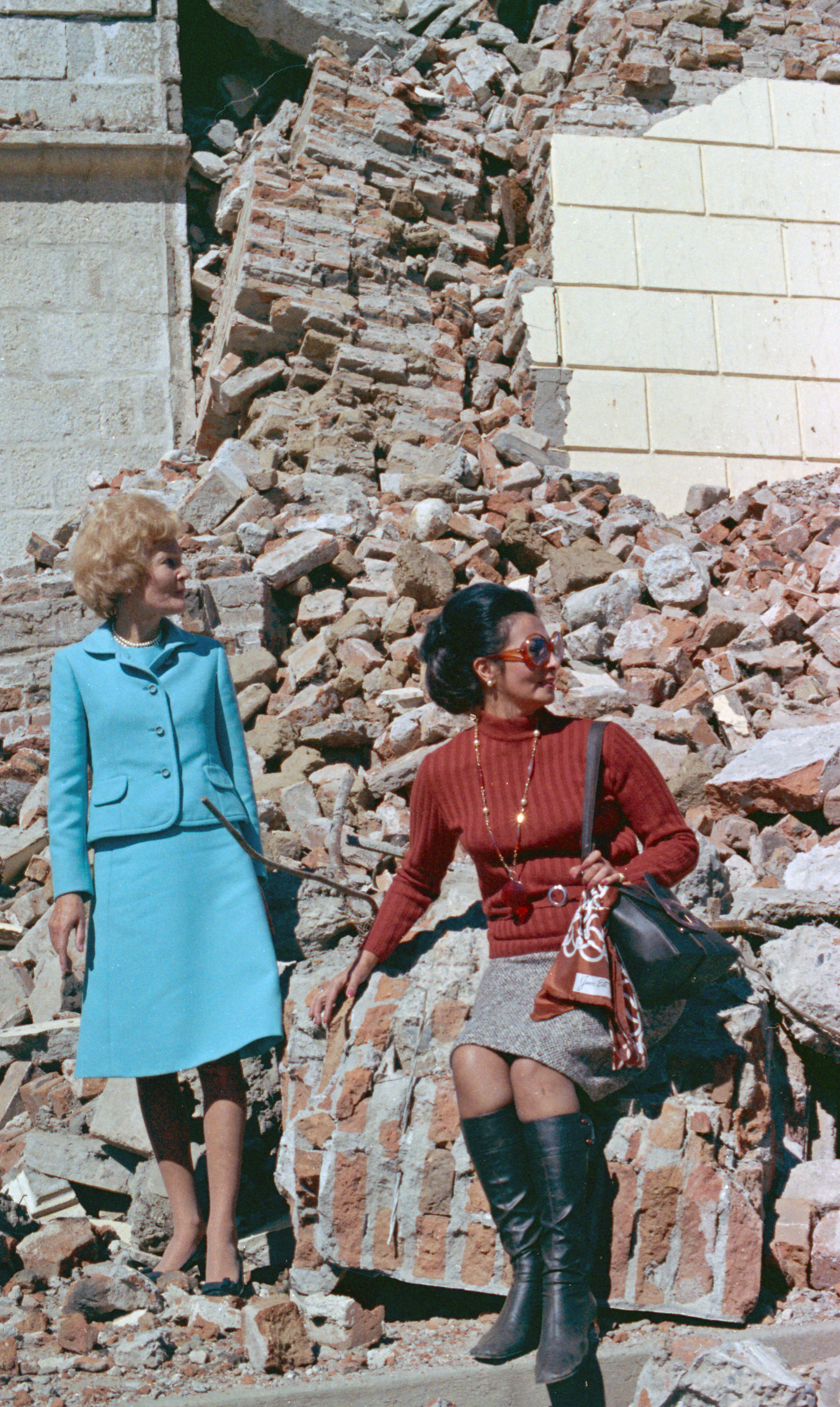
Gonzáles and U.S. First Lady Pat Nixon tour damage after the 1970 earthquake.

As first lady of Peru, she acted as the president of the National Assistance Board (Spanish: Junta de Asistencia Nacional, JAN), working to assist the victims of the 1970 earthquake and avalanche in Yungay.

The revolutionary government created the National Commission for Peruvian Women, which was chaired by Gonzáles.

On the other hand, she visited the United States, where she met with Pat Nixon, and two years later, she undertook a tour of India, Algeria, Mexico and Cuba.

At the beginning of 1973, Alvarado suffered a health collapse due to an aneurysm and a ruptured abdominal aorta. Gonzáles Posada was in charge of transmitting messages to the population on behalf of her husband while he was recovering from the two surgeries. In August 1975, General Francisco Morales Bermúdez carried out a coup against the revolutionary government. After that, Velasco and his wife moved to Chaclacayo. She died in September 2012.

== See also ==
- First Lady of Peru
