= Talara Refinery =

Oil refinery in Peru

Coordinates: 4.582°S 81.281°W

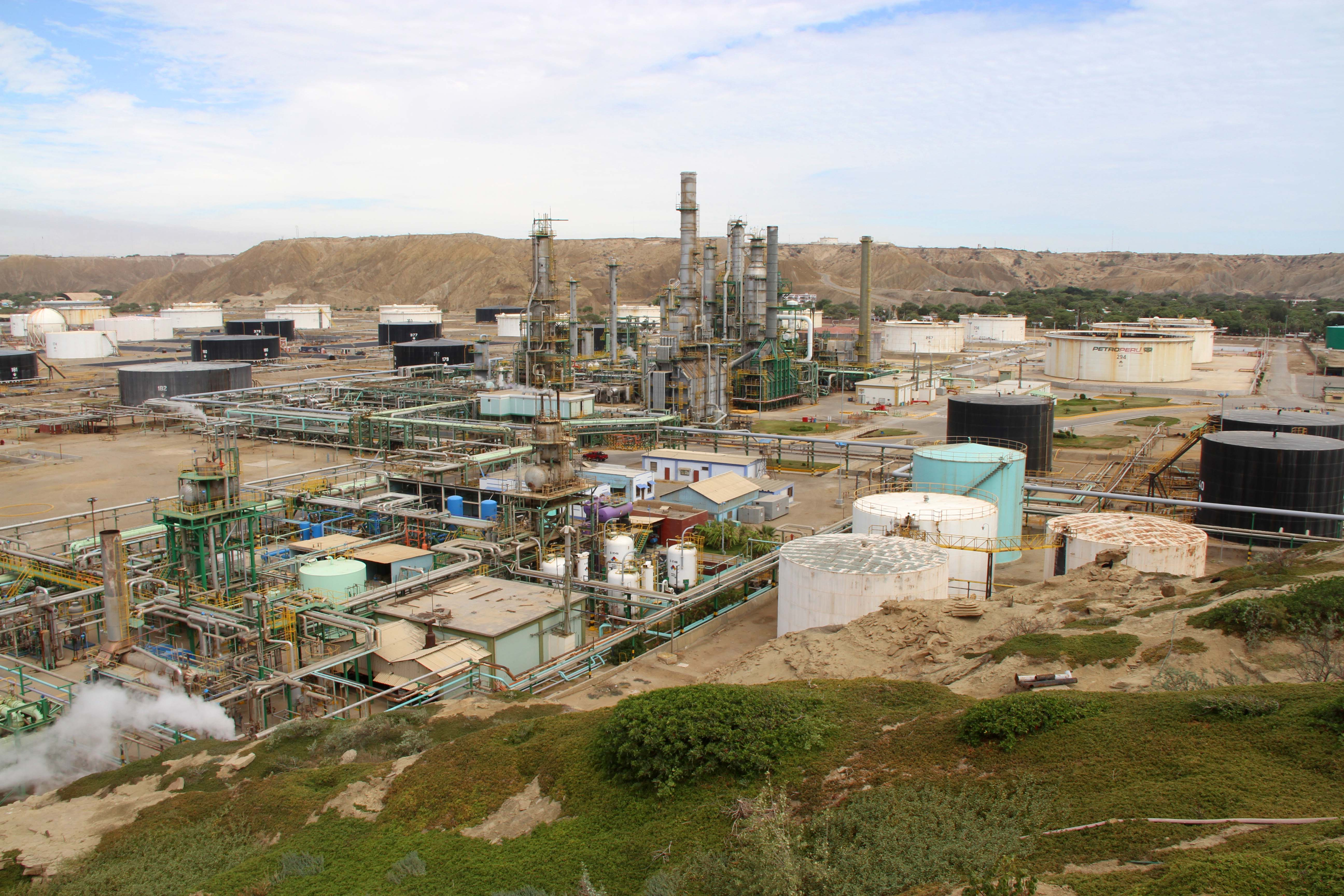
- View in 2020
- Country: Peru
- Region: Piura
- Location: Talara Province
- Operator: Petroperú; Esso (1917–1968)

Field history
- Discovery: 19th century
- Start of development: 1917

The Talara Refinery (Spanish: Refinería de Talara) is an oil refinery in Pariñas, Talara, Piura, Peru that belongs to the state company Petroperú.

Its origin lies in the first crude oil refinery in Peru in 1917, with an initial capacity of 10,000 barrels per day, by the International Petroleum Company (IPC). Since 2014, the complex began a renovation process, with many new plants under construction, with emphasis on deep conversion units and hydrotreatment of refined products.

== History ==
The refinery was created in 1917, when the International Petroleum Company (IPC), with a team of professionals from Talara, put into service four distillation stills with a processing capacity of 10,000 barrels per day (MBD). In 1926 it installed the four Thermal Cracking Units and, in 1929, the Lubricant Distillation Plant, entering that market. In 1938 it expanded its offering with the Asphalt Plant and, finally, in 1954 it began operating the Tubular Alembic No. 2 (today the Primary Distillation Unit), with a processing capacity of 45 MBDC of crude oil, which, in 1962, was expanded to 62 MBDC.

=== State control ===
When the so-called Revolutionary Government of the Armed Forces was established, on July 24, 1969, the state company Petróleos del Perú (Petroperú) was created, taking control of the country's oil industry, after the capture of La Brea and Pariñas on October 9, 1968, celebrating that date as National Dignity Day (abolished after 1980). It was not until 1975 that new industrial projects were promoted. The refinery installed the current Catalytic Cracking Complex (CCC), made up of the Vacuum Distillation Unit (UDV) with a processing capacity of 19.8 MBDC, and a Catalytic Cracking Unit (UCC) with a processing capacity of 16.6 MBDC. Later, they were expanded to 29 MBDC and 19 MBDC, respectively.

With the return of the democratic and civil government, the refinery installed a basic petrochemical complex made up of fertiliser plants (urea and ammonia), carbon black and solvents (acetone and isopropyl alcohol).

Subsequently, between 1991 and 1992, the petrochemical complex was closed as part of the privatisation process. Despite this, in 1995 the current Liquid Cargo Dock came into operation, for the entry and exit of products from the refinery to the national and international markets. However, the privatisation process was mired in controversy due to the implications for natural gas packaging, which led to its completion being pending.

In 2003, the crude oil desalination plant was installed, the furnace replaced and the instrumentation system modernised. And in 2007 it put into service two crude oil storage tanks of 137 MB each.

=== Expansion and modernisation ===
On May 29, 2014, Petroperú signed a contract for the execution of a primary part (Process Units) of the Megaproject of the New Talara Refining Complex with the Spanish firm Técnicas Reunidas for an amount equivalent to US$2,730 million. At that time, it was planned to complement the project with the outsourcing of Auxiliary Units for the production of Hydrogen, Electric Power, Treated Sea Water, among other important facilities. However, the planning did not materialise due to the decision of the then chairman of the Board of Directors Germán Velásquez Salazar. Subsequently, the project became more expensive by approx. USD 1,000 million.

Currently, the New Talara Refining Complex has a committed investment of around US$5,000 million. On May 29, work on the modernisation of the refinery began.

The cost of modernising the refinery was estimated in 2014 at US$3.5 billion, of which 78% will be financed by Petroperú and 22% by the private company. The reduction of the sulfur content was expected to be reduced from 1,700 parts per million (ppm) to 50 (ppm) and increase oil refining from 60,000 to 90,000 barrels per day.

In 2019, the project was estimated to have a value of between US$4,500 to US$4,700 million. The project began in 2014 and by 2019 the project was 80.7% complete. By March 2020, it needed to finance 900 million dollars to complete the modernization of which a credit from the Spanish government of 285 million dollars had already been approved. By January 2021, the project was 92.88% complete.

On April 12, 2022, the new Talara refinery was inaugurated. On September 22, 2023, a fire occurred in the Fluidised Catalytic Cracking Unit. In December 2023, full operation of the refinery began.

== See also ==
- Talara Basin
- La Brea and Pariñas

== Sources ==
- Chirinos, Enrique (1985). Historia de la República (1930-1985) (in Spanish). Vol. 2 (3rd ed.). Lima: AFA Editores Importadores S.A.
