= Edgardo Seoane =

Peruvian engineer, agronomist and politician

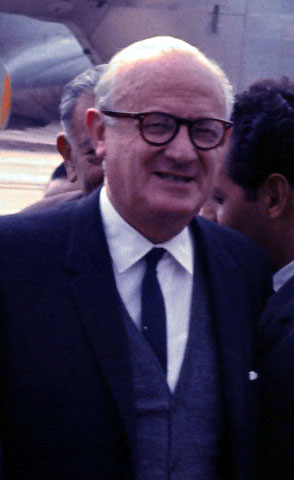
Edgardo Seoane

Edgardo Seoane Corrales (May 15, 1903 – May 25, 1978) was an engineer, agronomist and politician of Peru. He was Vice President of Peru during the first government of Fernando Belaúnde Terry (1963–1968) and president of the Council of Ministers and Minister of Foreign Affairs from September to November 1967. He was also an ambassador in Mexico (1965–1967) and general secretary of the Popular Action party.

== Early life ==
He was the son of Guillermo Alejandro Seoane Avellafuertes and Manuela Corrales Melgar, and brother of Manuel Seoane Corrales, who became an important APRA leader. He studied at the Colegio Santa Rosa de Chosica, and then went to study at the National School of Agriculture, where he received a degree in agricultural engineering. He was elected as president of the Student association of Peru.

He began his career at Huayto hacienda, first as a surveyor, and then was promoted at the administrative level. As an administrator, he went to the Vilcahuaura hacienda (1930) and then to the Pucalá hacienda ( 1931–1948 ), where he carried out studies on the influence of irrigation on crops, as well as experiments in plant physiology. In the late 1940s he became the owner of the Mamape hacienda, in the Ferreñafe district, near Chiclayo. Using modern techniques, he increased the production of this farm, and simultaneously promoted regional agricultural development through the formation of a cooperative credit organization. He considered himself as a reformer who "rode on a steed or tractor, carving furrows of Peru's agrarian modernity."

== Political career ==
In 1962, he ran for the first vice presidency of the Republic on the electoral alliance headed by the architect Fernando Belaunde Terry, but the elections of that year were annulled by the military, who called new elections for 1963. In these, Belaunde triumphed, and Seoane was thus elected first vice president, coming to exercise the Executive Power when the president left Peru to attend the Continental Conference held in Punta del Este, Uruguay. Then he was ambassador to Mexico (1965–1967) and was elected secretary general of Popular Action at the congress of that party held in Cajamarca.

When the government was forced to carry out a drastic currency devaluation in September 1967, it translated into deep disappointment for the citizenry and the subsequent fall of the Becerra cabinet. Seoane was then summoned to preside over a new cabinet, taking charge of the Foreign Relations office (from September 6 to November 17 of that year). He was already known as the leader of the radicals of his party, in the journalistic jargon -the "thermocephalus", who sought to deepen social reforms, especially regarding agrarian reform. He resigned from the ministry after the defeat of the ruling candidates in complementary elections for Parliament (November 1967).

Shortly after the signing of the Talara Act (agreement signed between the government and the International Petroleum Company), the "page eleven scandal" broke out. Seoane demanded the annulment of the Talara Act.When his demand was neglected, he announced that the Popular Action organization had broken ties with its formal leader, Fernando Belaunde ( September 17, 1968 ). In response, Belaunde expelled Seoane from his party. This produced conflict within the party, creating another faction, called Acción Popular Socialista (or Seoanista).

After the coup d'état led by General Juan Velasco Alvarado on October 3, 1968, Seoane collaborated with the military government on matters related to his professional knowledge and experience.

== Bibliography ==
- Chirinos Soto, Enrique: Historia de la República (1930-1985). Desde Sánchez Cerro hasta Alan García. Volume II. Lima, AFA Editores Importadores S.A., 1985.
- Chirinos Soto, Enrique – Chirinos Lizares, Guido: El Septenato. 1968–1975. Lima, Perú, 1977. Editorial Alfa.
- Tauro del Pino, Alberto: Enciclopedia Ilustrada del Perú. Third Edition.Volume 15. SAL/SZY. Lima, PEISA, 2001. ISBN 9972-40-164-1
