= Javier Silva Ruete =

Peruvian politician, lawyer and economist

Javier Edilberto Silva Ruete (17 September 1935 – 21 September 2012) was a Peruvian politician, lawyer and economist.

== Early life and education ==
Silva Ruete was the son of Max Silva Velásquez, a notable physician from Piura, and Raquel Ruete de Silva. He studied at the Colegio Salesianos and the Colegio San Miguel in Piura. Silva Ruete studied Economy and Law at the Universidad Nacional Mayor de San Marcos. He later obtained postgraduate degrees from Uruguay, Italy, France and the United States. He worked at the Peruvian Central Reserve Bank and Banco de Fomento Agropecuario.

== Political career ==
Silva Ruete served as Minister of Agriculture in the First Presidency of Fernando Belaúnde Terry (1965 and 1967). When he was appointed he was the youngest Minister of Agriculture in the history of the country. At the time he belonged to the Christian Democrat Party (PDC). He later served as Minister of Economy and Finance in the cabinets of Francisco Morales-Bermúdez (1978-1980), Valentín Paniagua (2000) and Alejandro Toledo (2002). During his years as minister in the Morales-Bermúdez government he implemented neoliberal policies in accord with the International Monetary Fund. He served as director of the Peruvian Central Reserve Bank and the Inter-American Development Bank (IADB). He held different posts in FAO, World Bank and Corporación Andina de Fomento. He was also a board member of different private companies.

In 1984, he founded the political party Solidarity and Democracy (SODE) together with Manuel Moreyra and Aurelio Loret de Mola. He contested the 1985 election as a SODE candidate on the APRA list, winning a seat in the Senate. He obtained 116,478 preferential votes.

He became president of the Central Reserve Bank in 2003 and served until 2004.

Silva Ruete died of cancer, at the age of 77 on 21 September 2012.

== Bibliography ==
- Javier Silva Ruete (1 January 2008). Política económica para países emergentes. Taurus. ISBN 978-603-40-0601-0.
- Javier Silva Ruete (1983). La deuda externa del Perú. Fundación Friedrich Ebert.
