= Mensaje a la nación =

Political tradition of Spanish American countries

The Message to the Nation (Spanish: Mensaje a la nación) is a political tradition in Hispanic American countries that consists of a speech delivered by the head of state before a representation of the Nation in which the government is rendered accountable at the beginning of the new ordinary legislative period or extraordinary measures are announced.

== Background ==
Communication between the Head of State, or to whom the government delegates, and the country's Parliament is a deeply rooted custom in European monarchies. In the case of the Spanish Monarchy, it was established by law in article 123 of the Spanish Constitution of 1812.

The King will make a speech, in which he will propose to the Cortes what he deems appropriate; and to which the president will answer in general terms. If the King does not attend, he will send his speech to the president, so that it can be read by him in the Cortes.

— Article 123, Spanish Constitution of 1812

== By country ==
=== Argentina ===
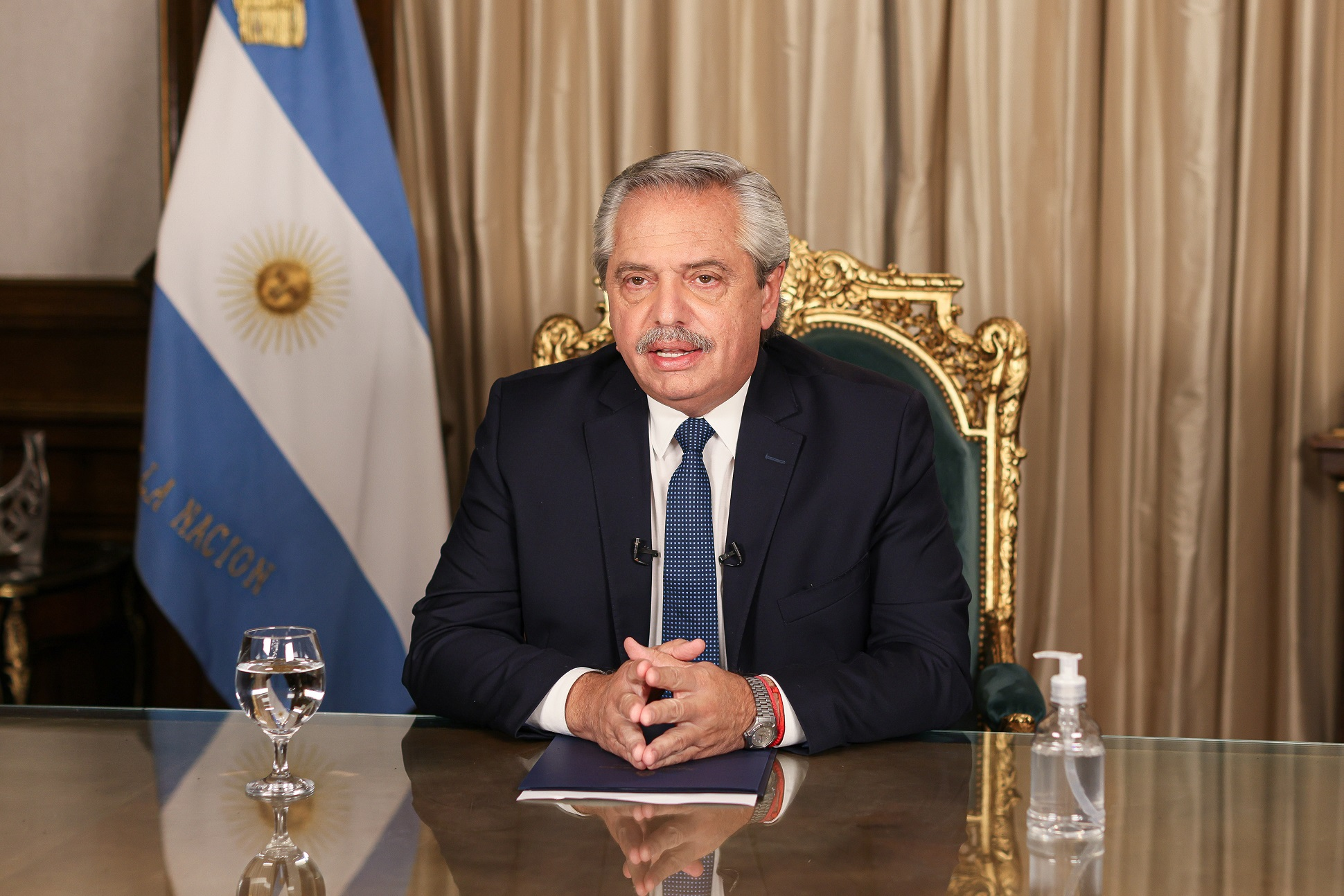
Argentine President Alberto Fernández delivers a speech from the Casa Rosada on March 18, 2021.

Annually, on the first of March, the opening of ordinary sessions of the National Congress is held. This is ruled by the Constitution of the Argentine Nation:

8. [The President] annually opens the sessions of Congress, meeting for this purpose both Chambers, giving an account on this occasion of the state of the Nation, of the reforms promised by the Constitution, and recommending for its consideration the measures that he deems necessary and convenient.

— Article 99 of the Argentine constitution

The opening ceremony of ordinary sessions takes place in the chamber of the Chamber of Deputies, although it is presided over by the president of the upper house. The speech is before the Legislative Assembly, since there are members of both chambers, as well as the cabinet of ministers and judges of the Supreme Court. The ceremony is broadcast by the National Radio and Television Network, and is also broadcast by the main news channels in the country.

Some Argentine provinces also have this ceremony. For example, the City of Buenos Aires and the Province of Buenos Aires, also inaugurate their period of ordinary sessions on March 1, giving a speech that, although it is not broadcast on the national (or provincial) network, is usually broadcast live online.

=== Chile ===
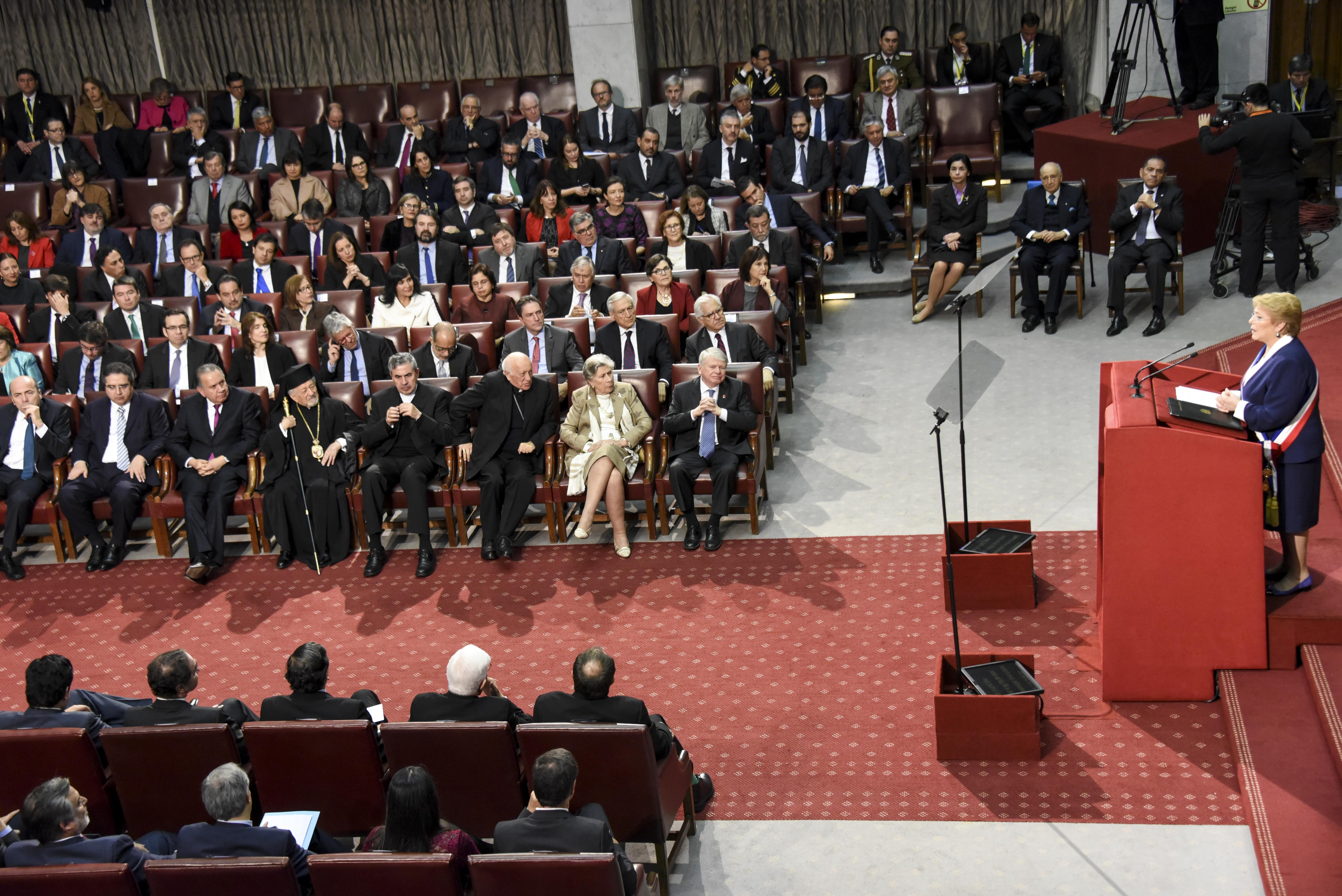
Public account of President Michelle Bachelet on June 1, 2017, in the Hall of Honour of the Chilean Congress in Valparaíso.

The custom, known in Chile as the Public Account (Spanish: Cuenta pública) began with the Constitution of 1833, setting June 1 as the annual date for the rendering of accounts by the President of the country. However, in 1925 it was established that the presidential speech before the National Congress should be on May 21, coinciding with Navy Day, and with the beginning of the regular session in Congress.

Until 1973, the message to the Nation was pronounced, with some exceptions, without interruption. That year the military dictatorship of General Augusto Pinochet moved the date to September 11 and the place to the Diego Portales building, headquarters of the Military Junta, since Congress was closed.

The Constitution of 1980, promulgated by the same regime, did not alter the situation, since it only established that the president had to report annually to the country on the administrative and political state of the nation. With the return of democracy in 1990, the speech was restored to May 21, which was officially established with the constitutional reform of 2005. In 2017, as a consequence of another constitutional reform, the speech was moved from May 21 to June 1, thus returning to its original date.

=== Mexico ===
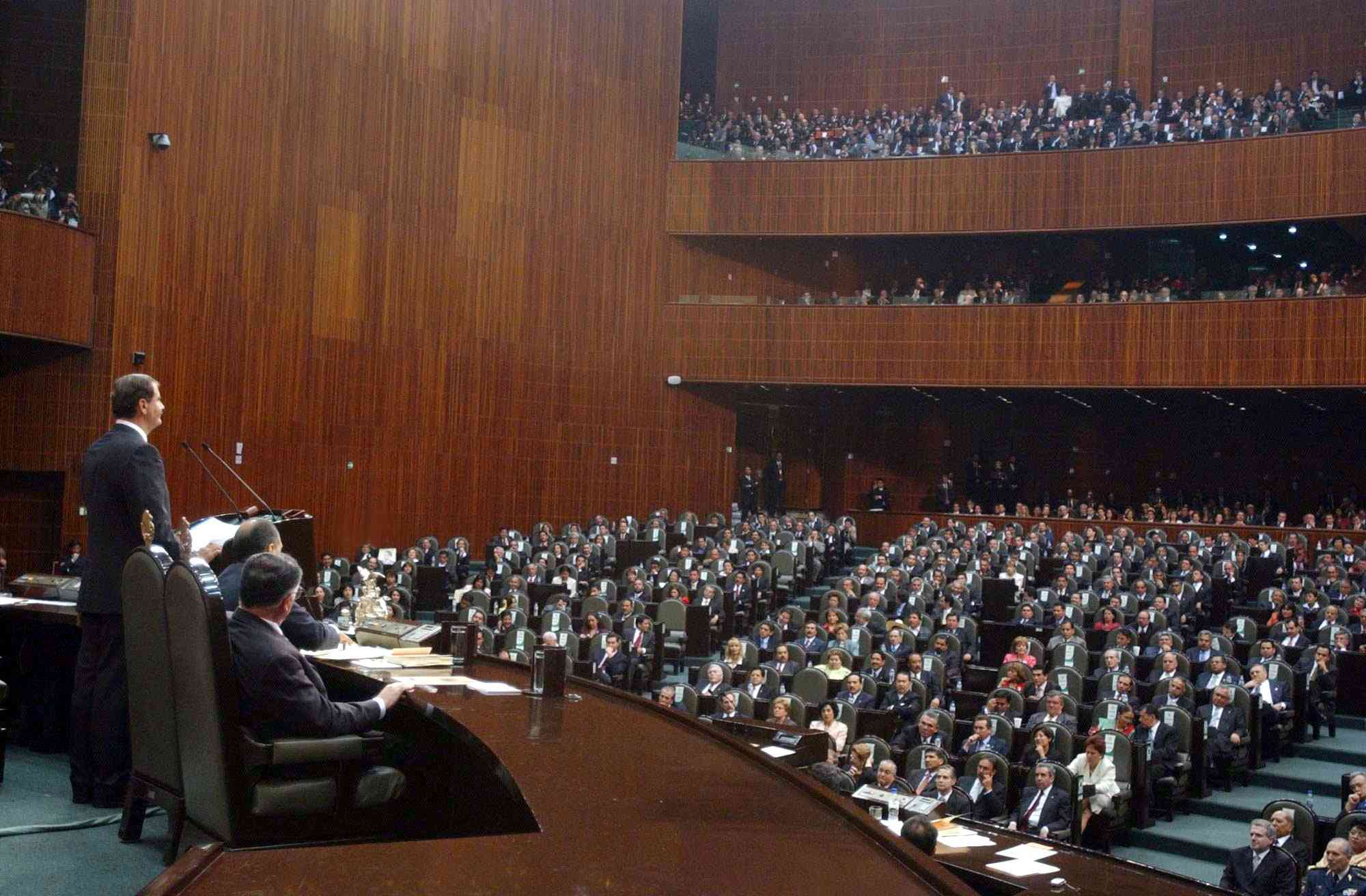
The President of Mexico, Vicente Fox, renders his Fourth Report on September 1, 2004.

The Government Report (Spanish: Informe de Gobierno), which is how the speech before the Congress of the Union by the president of the Mexican government is known in Mexico, was established from the Federal Constitution of 1857. The written presentation of the Report was recently established by law in article 69 of the Constitution of 1917, a fundamental norm that is still in force.

At the opening of Ordinary Sessions of the First Period of each year of Congress, the President of the Republic will present a written report, in which he states the general state of the country's public administration (...).

— Article 69 of the Constitution of Mexico

Despite the fact that the constitutional obligation was established since 1857, the first Report was read by President Guadalupe Victoria on January 1, 1825. The date of its presentation in writing and reading on September 1 of each year was established by the President Venustiano Carranza. Regarding its form of mass transmission, the first radio report was that of President Lázaro Cárdenas in 1936, while the first televised one was the Fourth Report of President Miguel Alemán Valdés in 1950, this transmission also being the first program broadcast on commercial television.

Traditionally, the speech was read by the president from the Tribune of the hemicycle of the Legislative Palace of San Lázaro, but from the Sixth Government Report of Vicente Fox of 2006 it was decided that a summary would be delivered to the President of the Board of Directors of Congress for then carry out the reading through public television, this alteration of the protocol was due to the fact that Fox's Fifth Report was booed and the president was prevented by a group of deputies from going up to the Tribune, so it could not be read in parliament. Thus it was established that the Secretary of the Interior delivered the Report to Congress on September 1 and the president read it the following day, September 2, at the National Palace.

Subsequently, both the Chamber of Deputies and the Chamber of Senators carry out a political, legal, economic and social analysis of the Report and may request further information through written questions and, within their powers, summon the Secretaries of State and the directors of parastatal entities who will appear and render reports under oath to tell the truth.

=== Peru ===
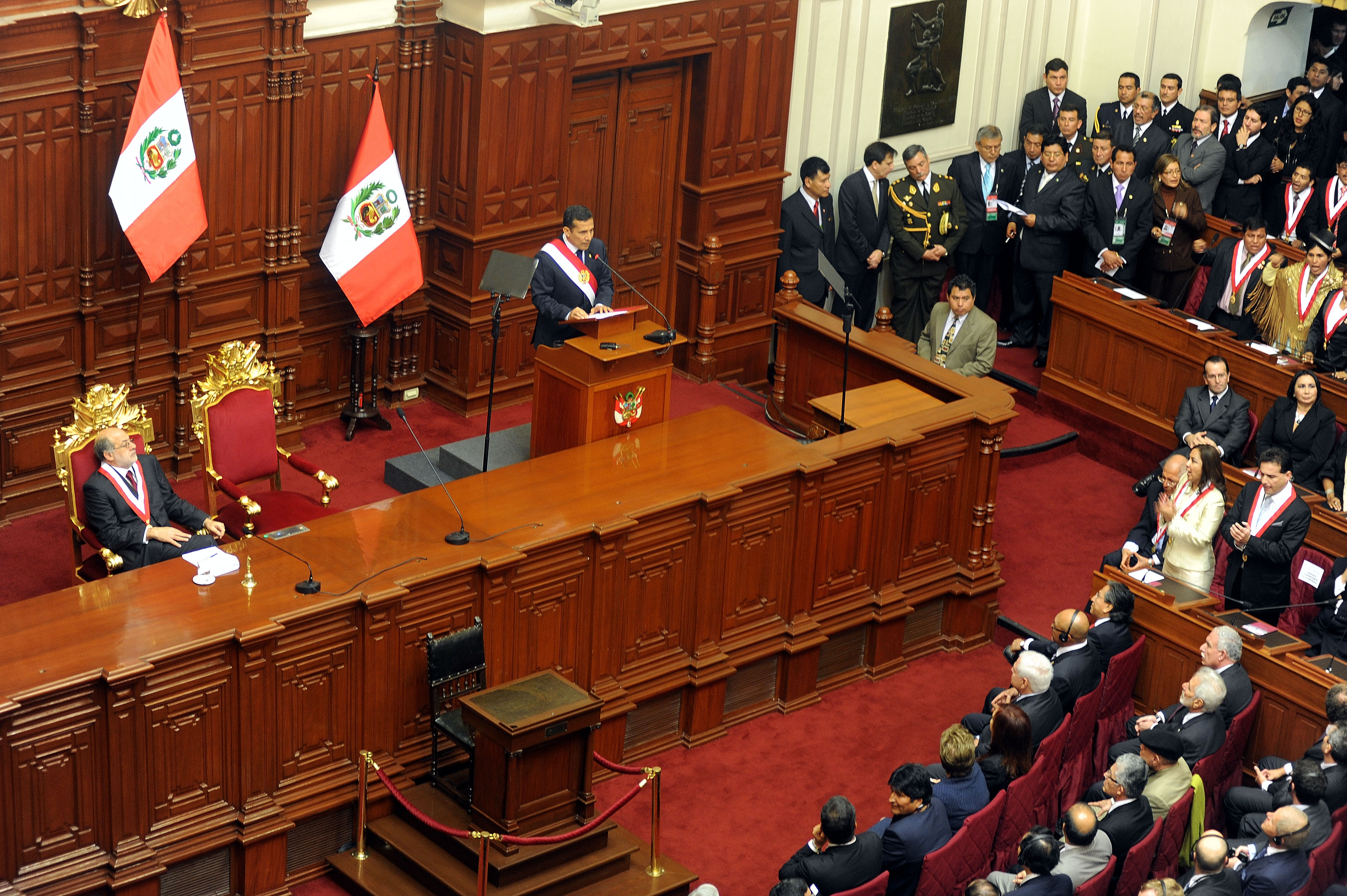
Peruvian President Ollanta Humala delivers his first speech on July 28, 2011.

In Peru, the tradition of the Annual Message (Spanish: Mensaje Anual) was born when President Agustín Gamarra gave a speech before the Peruvian Parliament on July 28, 1832.

According to article 118 of the 1993 Constitution, the President of the Republic must make a speech, previously approved by the Council of Ministers, in the hemicycle of the Legislative Palace before the National Congress in a solemn session on July 28 during the celebration of National Holidays where the president will present the situation of his government and the commitments and proposals for improvement, as well as projects for the following political course:

7. [It corresponds to the President] to address messages to Congress at any time and obligatorily, personally and in writing, when the first annual ordinary legislature is installed. The annual messages contain a detailed exposition of the situation of the Republic and the improvements and reforms that the President deems necessary and convenient for his consideration by Congress. The messages of the President of the Republic, except the first one, are approved by the Council of Ministers.

— Article 118 of the Peruvian Constitution

Although it is not established by any protocol rule or regulation, it was customary for the President of Congress to respond to the presidential message as a courtesy, until Law No. 1100 of October 4, 1909 suppressed the reply, giving the session adjourned at the end of the presidential speech.

On the other hand, during the ceremony for the transfer of powers in Congress, the outgoing president delivers a message in which he renders accounts and makes a portrait of the achievements of his administration. Then, the president thanks and delivers the presidential sash, symbol of the country's supreme command, to the president of Congress, who will hold it for a short period of time. After the arrival of the president-elect, he takes an oath before the president of Congress, who gives him the band. Afterwards, he reads his first message to the Nation before Congress. This situation was avoided by President Alan García at the end of his second government in 2011 for fear that he would repeat the booing situation at the end of his first term in 1990.

In addition to the dates indicated as traditional for the presidential speech, different Peruvian presidents have used the formula of the message to the Nation issued by the media to announce extraordinary measures, such as the seizure of La Brea and Pariñas in 1969 by the Revolutionary Government of the Armed Forces, the 1992 self-coup by Alberto Fujimori, or the dissolution of Congress proposed by Martín Vizcarra in 2019.

There is no extension or time limit for the presidential message. It is known that President Manuel Prado Ugarteche has been the one who has made the most extensive messages.

On the other hand, the message to the Nation of July 28, 1881 pronounced by Nicolás de Piérola, at that time Provisional President parallel to the captive government of Francisco García-Calderón during the War of the Pacific, was read in the National Assembly of Ayacucho, in the mountains of Peru, an act that was carried out for the only time outside of Lima. In the same context of the war with Chile, the 1879 speech was read in Congress by Vice President Luis La Puerta due to the trip of President Mariano Ignacio Prado to Arica to supervise the military campaign in the south.

== See also ==
- Christmas Eve National Speech
- State of the Union
