= Oscar Prieto =

Oscar Prieto may refer to:

- Oscar Prieto Ortiz (1905–1983), Venezuelan baseball executive and promoter
- Óscar Vargas Prieto (1917–1989), Peruvian soldier and politician
