= Luis Edgardo Mercado Jarrín =

Peruvian politician and Prime Minister

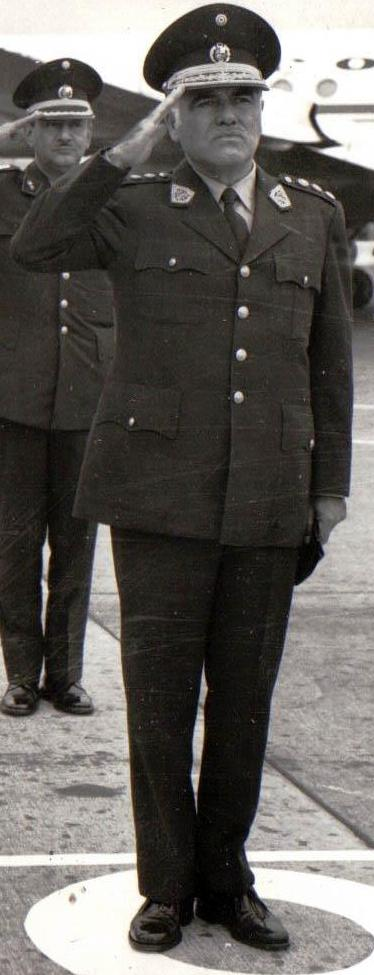
Luis Edgardo Mercado Jarrín

Luis Edgardo Mercado Jarrín (September 19, 1919 – June 18, 2012) was a Peruvian politician who was Prime Minister of Peru from January 31, 1973 to February 1, 1975. He was Foreign Minister. He served in both positions during the military dictatorship of President Juan Velasco Alvarado. Mercado had considerable influence on the foreign policy of the Velasco regime. Velasco was a critic of U.S. foreign policy towards Peru. He was a critic of the Inter-American Treaty of Reciprocal Assistance, arguing that it led to the dependence of Latin American states on the United States.

After the 1968 coup that put Velasco in power, Mercado established diplomatic relations and signed a trade pact with the Soviet Union.

He was born in Barranco.

Political offices
Preceded by Ernesto Montagne Sánchez	Prime Minister of Peru; 1973–1975	Succeeded by Francisco Morales Bermúdez
