= Óscar Vargas Prieto =

Peruvian politician (1917–1989)

Prime Minister of Peru
- In office 30 August 1975 – 31 January 1976
- President: Francisco Morales-Bermúdez
- Preceded by: Francisco Morales-Bermúdez
- Succeeded by: Jorge Fernández Maldonado Solari

Minister of War
- In office 30 August 1975 – 31 January 1976
- Preceded by: Francisco Morales-Bermúdez
- Succeeded by: Jorge Fernández Maldonado Solari

General Commander of the Peruvian Army
- In office 30 August 1975 – 31 January 1976
- Preceded by: Francisco Morales-Bermúdez
- Succeeded by: Jorge Fernández Maldonado Solari

Military service
- Allegiance: Peru
- Branch/service: Peruvian Army
- Rank: Division general

Óscar Vargas Prieto (August 8, 1917 – January 17, 1989) was a Peruvian soldier and politician. He was the Prime Minister of Peru from August 1975 to January 1976.

Preceded by Francisco Morales Bermúdez	Prime Minister of Peru; August 30, 1975 – January 31, 1976	Succeeded by Jorge Fernández Maldonado Solari
