= Francisco Morales Bermúdez =

President of Peru from 1975 to 1980

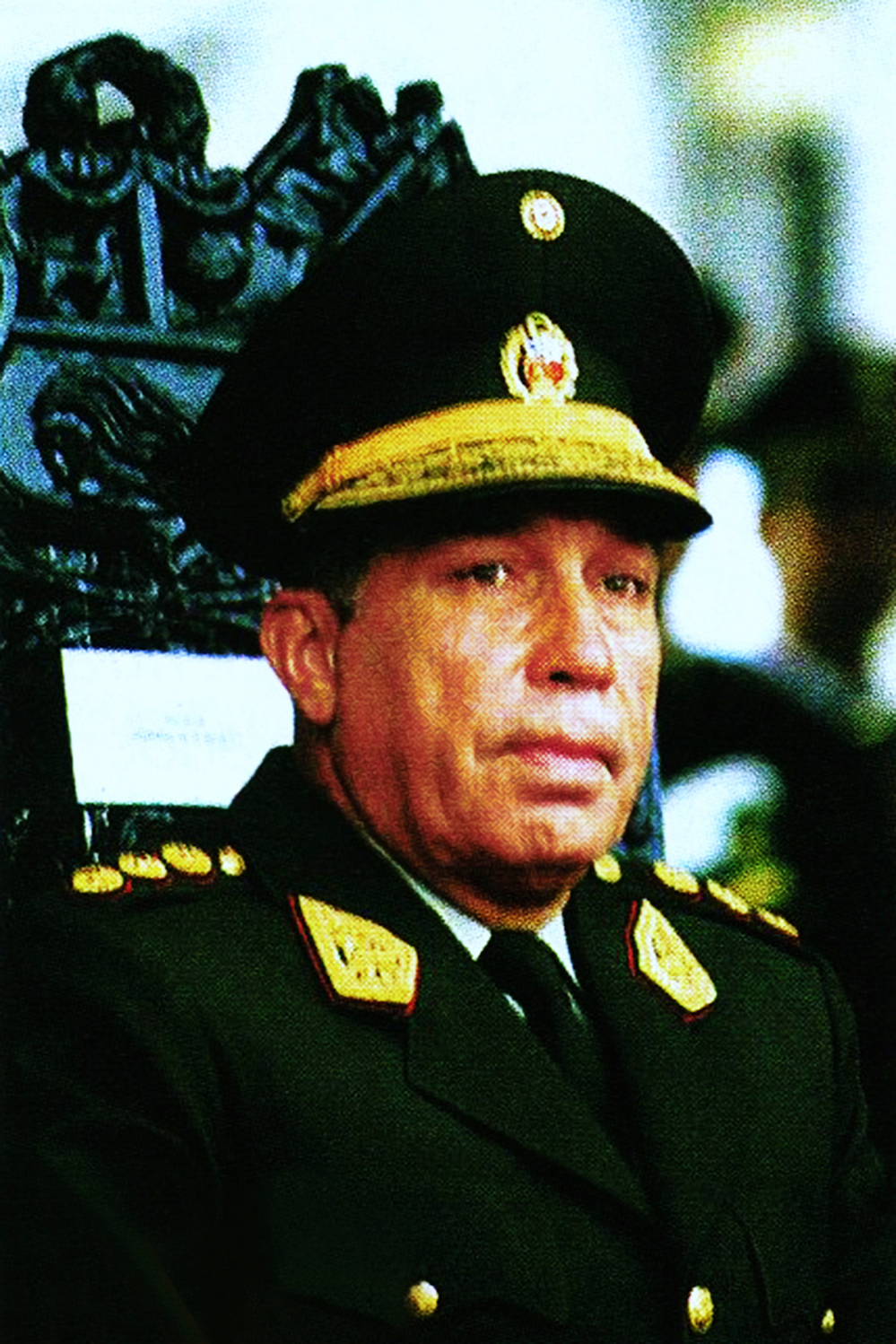
- Morales Bermúdez in 1975

President of Peru

2nd President of the Revolutionary Government of the Armed Forces
- In office 29 August 1975 – 28 July 1980
- Prime Minister: Oscar Vargas Prieto; Jorge Fernández Maldonado; Guillermo Arbulú Galliani; Óscar Molina Pallochia; Pedro Richter Prada
- Preceded by: Juan Velasco Alvarado
- Succeeded by: Fernando Belaúnde (as constitutional president)

Prime Minister of Peru
- In office 1 February 1975 – 29 August 1975
- President: Juan Velasco Alvarado
- Preceded by: Luis Edgardo Mercado Jarrín
- Succeeded by: Oscar Vargas Prieto

Minister of War
- In office 1 February 1975 – 29 August 1975
- President: Juan Velasco Alvarado
- Preceded by: Luis Edgardo Mercado Jarrín
- Succeeded by: Oscar Vargas Prieto

General Commander of the Peruvian Army
- In office 1 February 1975 – 29 August 1975
- President: Juan Velasco Alvarado
- Preceded by: Luis Edgardo Mercado Jarrín
- Succeeded by: Oscar Vargas Prieto

Minister of Economy and Finance
- In office 13 June 1969 – 2 January 1974
- President: Juan Velasco Alvarado
- Preceded by: Ángel Valdivia Morriberon (Minister of Finance and Commerce)
- Succeeded by: Guillermo Marcó del Pont

Minister of Finance and Commerce
- In office 20 March 1968 – 21 May 1968
- President: Fernando Belaúnde
- Preceded by: Raúl Ferrero Rebagliati
- Succeeded by: Manuel Ulloa Elías

Personal details
- Born: Francisco Regimio Morales Bermúdez Cerruti; 4 October 1921 Lima, Peru
- Died: 14 July 2022 (aged 100) Miraflores, Lima, Peru
- Spouses: Rosa Pedraglio (m. 1942; died 1998); Alicia Saffer Michaelsen (m. 1999)
- Children: 5
- Relatives: Remigio Morales Bermúdez (grandfather)
- Profession: Army general

Military service
- Allegiance: Peru
- Branch/service: Peruvian Army
- Years of service: 1941–1980
- Rank: General

Francisco Remigio Morales Bermúdez Cerruti (4 October 1921 – 14 July 2022) was a Peruvian politician and general who was the de facto President of Peru (2nd President of the Revolutionary Government of the Armed Forces) between 1975 and 1980, after deposing his predecessor, General Juan Velasco. Unable to control the political and economic troubles that the nation faced, he was forced to return power to civilian rule, marking the end of the Revolutionary Government of the Armed Forces installed by a coup d'état in 1968. Like his predecessor he embraced a Third way.

== Early years ==
Morales Bermúdez was born in Lima on 4 October 1921. He was the son of Army Colonel Remigio Morales Bermúdez and grandson of ex-President Remigio Morales Bermúdez. His grandfather and all his original family were from the old Peruvian department of Tarapacá, which is now part of Chile.

He received most of his education at Lima's Colegio de la Inmaculada. In 1939, he was accepted into the Escuela Militar de Chorrillos (Chorrillos Military School). After his graduation, he was an important member of the Centro de Altos Estudios Militares (Center for Advanced Military Studies).

== Political career ==
Morales Bermúdez achieved the rank of brigadier general and was appointed to his first political post in 1968 as Minister of Economy and Finance in the administration of Fernando Belaúnde. Internal problems in government forced him to resign after two months.

In 1968, after Belaúnde had been deposed by a coup, the military government led by General Juan Velasco asked him to return to the post of Minister of Economy and Finance. In 1974, he resigned again, this time because he was appointed Commander-in-Chief of the Peruvian Army. In 1975, he was appointed to be both Velasco's prime minister and minister of war.

== Presidency (1975–1980) ==
With President Velasco's health deteriorating, Morales Bermúdez led a military coup against Velasco and took over as President of Peru on 29 August 1975, leading the country through one of its most severe economic crises.

Early in his presidency, in 1975, Bermúdez spoke of “socialism" being a goal for his government, but a few months later, as one study has noted, “Bermúdez himself announced that he would no longer use the term "socialism" because its meaning was not clear at all.” As Bermúdez explained

.. .the great part of the people of the groups of the right confuse the word Socialism with Communism... And the groups of the other side give different interpretations to the word "Socialism," different interpretations which do not coincide with the Ideological Bases of our Revolutionary Process.

He diverged from the revolutionary nationalist-leaning tendencies of the first phase (1968–1975) of the Peruvian Revolution. His regime participated in Operation Condor, with Peruvian forces collaborating with the Intelligence Battalion 601 in the kidnapping of Argentines in Lima in 1980. Around the end of Morales Bermúdez's tenure, a housing crisis emerged which started the Lost Decade. Morales Bermúdez, politically pressured from all sides, failed in enacting successful political and economic reform.

In 1978, amid a spying scandal with Chile, Morales Bermúdez declared the Chilean ambassador Francisco Bulnes Sanfuentes a persona non grata and ordered him to leave in January 1979, following the execution of Julio Vargas Garayar who, convicted of selling information to Chile, became the last person executed by Peru to date.

A Constituent Assembly convened by the Morales Bermudez administration was created in 1978, which replaced the 1933 Constitution enacted during Óscar R. Benavides's presidency. After elections were held in 1980, he returned power over to the first democratically elected government after 12 years of military rule, headed by President Fernando Belaúnde.

== Post-presidency (1980–2022) ==
After leaving office, Morales Bermúdez kept a relatively low profile in Peruvian politics, making sporadic speeches regarding the situation of the Peruvian army.

In 1985, he made an unsuccessful run for the presidency, obtaining a fraction of one percent of the vote.

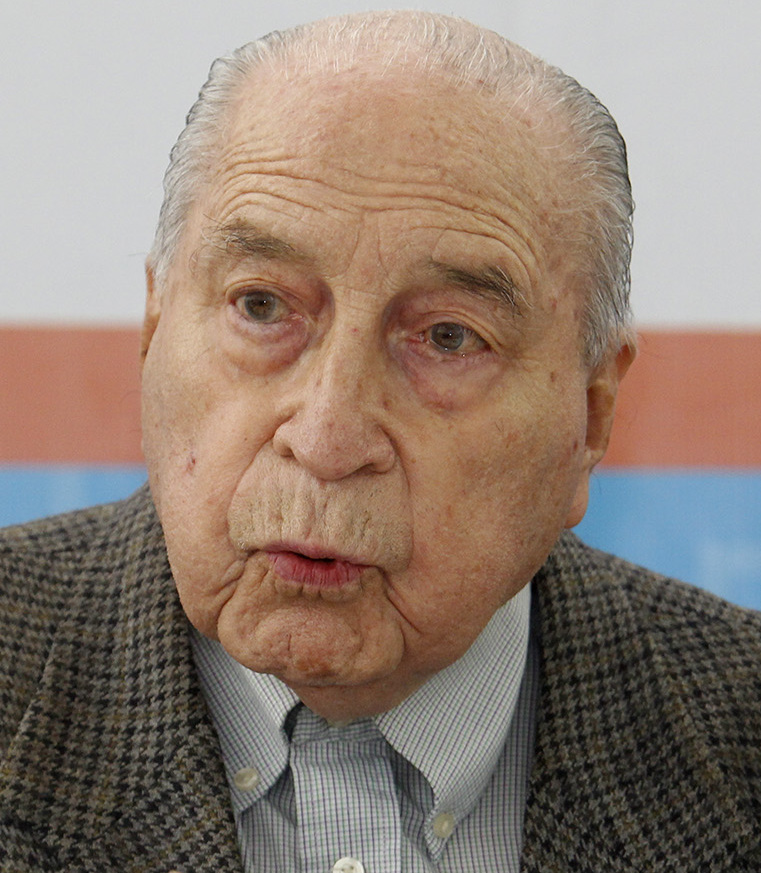
Morales Bermúdez in October 2016, aged 95

Morales Bermúdez was prosecuted by Italian judge Luisianna Figliolia for the forced disappearance of 25 Italian citizens in Peru during Operation Condor, a campaign backed by the United States government of political repression orchestrated by right-wing South American dictatorships during the 1960s, 1970s and 1980s. On 17 January 2017, the Corte d'Assise in Rome found Morales Bermúdez guilty and sentenced him to life imprisonment in absentia.

On 16 June 2021, Morales Bermúdez was among 63 former Peruvian military officials who signed a letter calling on the Peruvian armed forces to "...according to what is established in Article 46 of the our Constitution, the Armed Forces would have the right to non-obedience and therefore to disavow as President and Supreme Chief of the Armed Forces and National Police a person who has been appointed by violating the Constitution and Laws of our country, being able to appeal to the Congress of the Republic to provide a democratic solution in accordance with the Law" in response to the election that month of President-elect Pedro Castillo, the target of unsubstantiated claims of electoral fraud by his opponent Keiko Fujimori. The Ministry of Defense of Peru promptly issued a release where it clarified that this letter “does not represent the Armed Forces.”

Morales Bermúdez turned 100 on 4 October 2021, and died at a hospital in the Miraflores District of Lima on 14 July 2022. At the time of his death, he was the oldest living state leader.

Political offices
Preceded by Edgardo Mercado Jarrín	Prime Minister of Peru; 1 February 1975 – 30 August 1975	Succeeded by Óscar Vargas Prieto
Preceded by Juan Velasco	President of Peru (2nd President of the Revolutionary Government of the Armed Forces); 29 August 1975 – 28 July 1980	Succeeded by Fernando Belaúnde
Military offices
Preceded by Gral. Edgardo Mercado Jarrín	Commander-in-Chief of the Army; 1 February 1975 – 30 August 1975	Succeeded by Gral. Óscar Vargas Prieto
