= La Brea y Pariñas =

Oil complex in Peru

La Brea and Pariñas
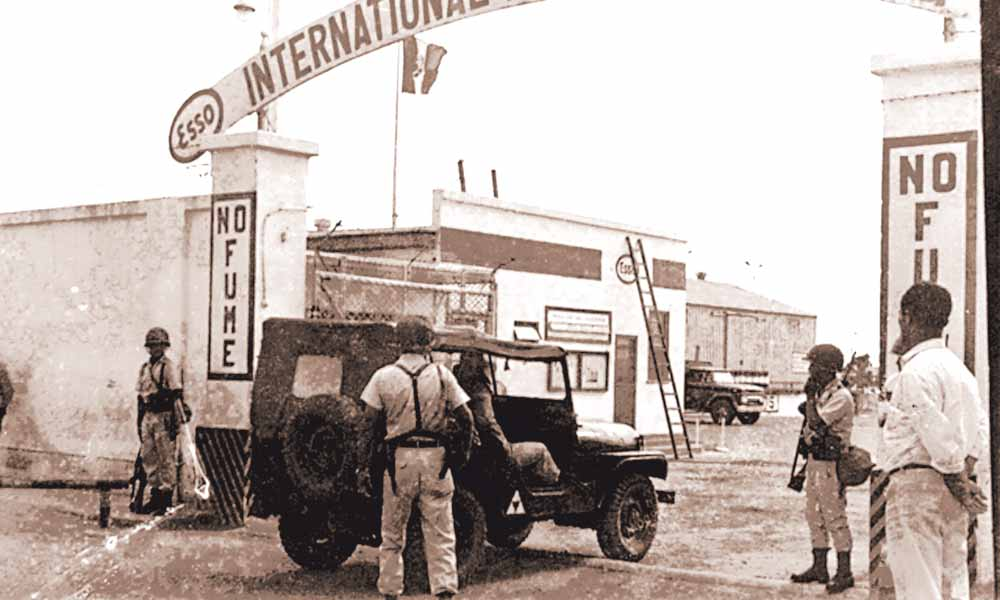
- The complex during its expropriation in 1968
- Country: Peru
- Region: Piura
- Location: Talara Province
- Operator: Standard Oil (IPC)

Field history
- Discovery: 19th century
- Abandonment: 1968

La Brea and Pariñas (Spanish: La Brea y Pariñas) was an industrial complex dedicated to the exploitation of the oil field located at the La Brea pampa and Pariñas ravine, located in northern Peru, at Talara Province, Piura. It operated from the early 19th century until 1968.

From 1890 onwards, it was exploited by the Anglo–American company London Pacific Petroleum Company, and from 1914 to 1968 by the American International Petroleum Company (IPC), a subsidiary of Standard Oil of New Jersey. The deposits gained notoriety from 1911, when it was discovered that their owners and tenants exploited many more lots than those originally registered, despite which, they refused to pay the taxes to which they were obliged according to Peruvian laws. The IPC even achieved advantageous tax and other exemptions from pro-American governments over several decades.

The long-standing controversy surrounding the refinery and its relation to the penetration of Anglo-American capitalism in Peru was the most scandalous case of its time, which had a considerable influence on the political sphere of the country. In 1968, the government of General Juan Velasco Alvarado ordered the military occupation of the complex, putting an end to the problem. However, the company never paid its debts to the Peruvian State.

== History ==
=== Origins ===
The sites' history begins during the initial years of Peru, a time in which they changed owners several times, until in 1873 they came into the possession of Genaro Helguero, who entered into deals with English capitalists interested in oil fields in the aftermath of the War of the Pacific. Despite the government demanding that he pay the tax of S/. 15 per pertenencia (even-shaped lots), he argued that the 1877 law applied to concessionaries and not to him, a fee simple owner.

Helguero sold the terrain to Herbert W. C. Tweddle in 1888 at a cost of £18,000. Tweddle established the London and Pacific Petroleum Company alongside businessman William Keswick to profit from the property. The company, named after the city where it was founded, was established with a share capital of £250,000. Its shareholders were Tweddle and Keswick themselves, as well as Lionell Ward, D. Jackson and O.A. Mygalt.

In 1888, the judge of Paita, by order of the then government of Andrés A. Cáceres, ordered the measurement of the pertenencias, confirming the existence of 10 of them (each equivalent to 10,000 m^{2}); and thus registering in the mine registry of Lima. The legal tax for each pertenencia was changed to S/. 30. This measurement turned out to be wrong, as would later be discovered, since the land actually consisted of thousands more pertenencias. It has been argued that the error was due to the lack of skill of the measurers or lack of knowledge of the laws regarding this type of measurements. It also causes suspicion that the judge was an employee of Helguero.

=== Controversy begins ===
Controversy broke out on December 3, 1911, when the engineer Ricardo A. Deustua made a public complaint, in the sense that the London-based company exploited many more assets than those recognised by the judge of Paita and the government in 1888. Given this, The Minister of Development ordered the property to be measured again, with engineers Héctor Boza and Alberto Jochamowitz being in charge of carrying it out. These, despite suffering the hostility of the English, who ordered the population to deny them even food and water, completed the work successfully, finding themselves surprised that there were not 10 but no less than 41,614 pertenencias.

By resolution of March 15, 1915, the first government of Óscar R. Benavides ordered the mining property "La Brea" to be registered in the General Register of Mines, leaving its owner obliged to pay the new number of remeasured belongings and whose amount showed the amount of S/.1,248,420 a year and not S/.300 that had been paid. The local historian Reynaldo Moya Espinoza writes that Deustua said that, in 1914, the company was operating on 1,000 properties and had drilled 700 wells. That led to the assumption that in reality the fee to be paid should have been S/.30,000 per year, but things were not considered that way at that time." He also affirmed the exaggeration of the treasury's claim, since those S/.1,248,420 annually calculated on belongings both in production and out of production far exceeded the profits that the company obtained each year.

Thus calculated by the Peruvian government, a million-dollar tax was owed, which the company refused to pay because it was exaggerated. Rather, in 1914, it sold its lease rights to the International Petroleum Company (IPC), a subsidiary of Standard Oil of New Jersey. In 1924 the IPC became owner of the deposits, through a purchase from the Keswick's heirs. The IPC exploited the site, installing stations around the country and building two docks at the port of Talara, where it purchased ships to distribute oil around Peru.

The second government of José Pardo y Barreda (1915–1919) was forced to face the solution of this issue when the IPC caused an oil crisis by stopping its exploitation of 30 wells in Negritos. For its part, the IPC had the governments of the United States and the United Kingdom intervene on its behalf, which was seen as an explicit example of said countries' interference in Peruvian affairs.

On December 26, 1918, the two chambers of the Peruvian Congress approved Law No. 3106, which authorised the State to submit the matter to international arbitration. In this way, the Peruvian government stripped itself of its sovereign powers to resolve an internal matter, taking it to international jurisdiction, which would have dire consequences. Despite this agreement that the matter be submitted to international arbitration, President Augusto B. Leguía, under pressure from the U.S. government, preferred to reach a transactional agreement.

=== Paris Award ===
Paris Award
- Signed: May 24, 1922
- Location: Paris
- Signatories: A. C. Grant Duff; Alberto Salomón

The transactional agreement was signed on March 2, 1922, between the Peruvian Foreign Minister Alberto Salomón and the English representative A. C. Grant Duff. This transactional agreement was presented to the Arbitration Court, which met in Paris and was made up of the president of the Swiss Federal Court and the representatives of the Peruvian and English governments. On April 24 of that year, 1922, without further discussion, they approved the Transactional Agreement, which they granted the status of Award, the conditions of which were binding on the high contracting parties as a solution to the controversy.

The agreements of the so-called Paris Award were as follows:

- The property of La Brea y Pariñas comprised an area of 41,614 properties and covered the soil and subsoil or mineralised area.
- Owners and tenants would pay for 50 years the amount of thirty soles per year per working property and one sole per non-working property. The belongings that were no longer exploited would pay one sol and those that were abandoned would become the property of the government.
- The owners and/or tenants would pay the corresponding export tax, which could not be increased for twenty years.
- The owners would only pay one million pesos, American gold, for contributions accrued as of December 31, 1921. In turn, the government of Peru annulled previous resolutions that were opposed to the spirit and execution of what was stipulated in the Award.

This arbitration award was adverse to Peruvian interests since it established a tax exception regime for the owners and exploiters of the oil field. The Treasury thus stopped receiving substantial amounts of money as taxes. The Leguía government thus set a precedent of submission to U.S. interests that would give rise to nationalist protests for several decades.

=== Act of Talara ===
In 1963, architect Fernando Belaúnde Terry won the presidential elections, one of whose electoral campaign promises was the solution to the controversy. As a first step, he sent to Congress a project to declare the Paris Award null and void and requested that the oil fields be taken over by the state-owned Empresa Petrolera Fiscal (EPF). In response to this request, Congress passed Law No. 14,696, which ipso jure declared the Award null and void, but did not rule on the second point. The Executive Branch promulgated the law on November 4, 1963, thus being authorised to seek a solution to the old problem. Finally, by Law 16,674 of July 26, 1967, the government was authorised to claim the IPC deposits and facilities against debts.

In July 1968 the government began negotiations with the IPC. On August 13 of the same year, both parties signed the Act of Talara (Spanish: Acta de Talara), by which all the oil fields were transferred to the EPF on account of the debts of the IPC, but it retained the Talara Refinery, the national fuel distribution system and the condominium in the so-called Lima Concessions (Spanish: Concesiones Lima). The IPC was obliged to buy all the oil that the EPF wanted to sell to it, to process it in its refinery in Talara. All of which went against the expectations created by Law 16,674, which required the delivery of all IPC facilities for their debts, but for the moment the government knew how to exploit the agreement as a great success of its management.

The act was signed by President Belaúnde, Carlos Manuel Cox (President of the Senate), Andrés Townsend (President of the Chamber of Deputies) and by senior officials of the IPC. The entire press echoed this event and announced the end of the long-standing controversy, thus satisfying public opinion.

=== Page 11 scandal ===
However, public opinion changed its mind when Oiga, a local magazine, revealed the conditions that the IPC had imposed for the signing of the act. The peak moment of the scandal came when the resigning president of the EPF, engineer Carlos Loret de Mola, reported on September 10, 1968, that page 11 of the crude oil price contract was missing. Many reports attributed great importance to the page alleging that it contained valuable information about costs; others argued that it was just a blank page and there were even some who denied its existence. The truth is that it served as a pretext for a group of army officers, led by General Juan Velasco Alvarado, to carry out a coup d'état less than a month later, accusing the government of "appeasement."

Pedro Pablo Kuczynski, then manager of the Central Reserve Bank of Peru was accused on October 3, alongside Carlos Rodríguez-Pastor Mendoza and Richard Webb Duarte of granting foreign currency certificates to the IPC without the signature of the Minister of Economy, allowing this company to remit $115 million of current profits. Due to this Kuczynski was forced to take refuge in the United States, hiding in the trunk of a Volkswagen car to escape. After a judicial process that lasted eight years, the Supreme Court of Justice of Peru acquitted Kuczynski, and other BCR officials, of all charges.

=== Military occupation ===
On October 9, 1968, the Revolutionary Government of the Armed Forces ordered the seizure of the IPC facilities in Talara, which was carried out by the forces of the First Military Region based in Piura, under the command of General Fermín Málaga. This event had a great impact on the country and helped the government to consolidate power. The date of October 9 was celebrated throughout the military government as the Day of National Dignity, abolished after the transition to democracy in 1980.

The IPC was definitively expelled from the country, and although Velasco repeatedly announced that he would not pay a cent in reparations to said company, it was later learned that the government secretly negotiated with the IPC, and that, through the De la Flor–Greene Agreement, Peru paid a global compensation of US$76 million to all US or US-owned companies affected by the expropriations. As for the debts that the IPC had with the State (which since 1924 were estimated at US$690 million), these were never paid.

=== Expulsion of the IPC ===
The IPC initiated a process against the Peruvian State claiming its interests, but finally, the Peruvian government ordered the seizure and definitive expulsion of the company on February 1, 1969. The IPC lost the rest it had left: its condominium in Concesiones Lima and its fuel distribution network. The value of the expropriated assets was charged against the amount of the company's alleged tax debt. Although Velasco repeatedly announced that he would not pay any cent of reparation to the IPC, however, it had the ability to compensate itself for 22 million dollars on account of the expropriations, in the following way: it remitted up to 5 million dollars for debts concerted abroad, and stopped paying the EPF some 17 million dollars for refining services at the already nationalised Talara refinery. When the IPC was finally intervened, the Peruvian authorities were surprised that all their accounts were in the red, finding nothing to make any payment.

Furthermore, the so-called De la Flor-Greene Agreement was made public knowledge, signed between the Peruvian and the United States governments on August 9, 1973, by which it was agreed that Peru would pay a global compensation of 76 million dollars to all American or American-owned companies that had been expropriated by the Peruvian government. Although the military government was categorical in stating that the IPC was not included among those companies, the truth is that the agreement stipulated that the distribution of all that compensation amount was the exclusive responsibility of the U.S. government. And in the exercise of that authority, the U.S. Treasury, on December 18, 1974, paid IPC's parent company, Esso, more than $23,157,000. That is to say, denying the military government's claim, the IPC was actually compensated, and this operation took place leaving both parties satisfied. To pay this global compensation of 76 million dollars, the Peruvian government obtained a loan from private banks in the United States.

== Aftermath ==
With respect to the oil fields, they were already in clear productive decline. The Talara refinery itself was already very obsolete by then, as its daily output was only 40,000 daily barrels. Based on all this, the military government created the entity PetroPerú, destined for the exploitation and commercialisation of oil wealth.

The new dispute between Peru and the United States generated tension between the countries. When the issue was raised at the United Nations, the former was backed by the Eastern bloc, with which it had recently established relations.

== See also ==
- History of Peru (1919–1930)
- First presidency of Fernando Belaúnde
- Revolutionary Government of the Armed Forces of Peru
- Petroperú

== Bibliography ==
- Basadre, Jorge (2005). Historia de la República del Perú (1822–1933) (9th ed.). Lima: Empresa Editora El Comercio S. A. ISBN 9972-205-74-6.
- Chirinos, Enrique (1985). Historia de la República (1930-1985) (in Spanish). Vol. 2 (3rd ed.). Lima: AFA Editores Importadores S.A.
- Guerra, Margarita (1984). Historia General del Perú. Vol. 11: La República Aristocrática (1st ed.). Lima: Editorial Milla Batres. pp. es.
- Pons Muzzo, Gustavo (1961). Historia del Perú (in Spanish). Vol. El Perú Contemporáneo. Lima: Editorial Universo S.A.
