= Expropriation of La Brea y Pariñas =

1968 oil refinery seizure in Peru

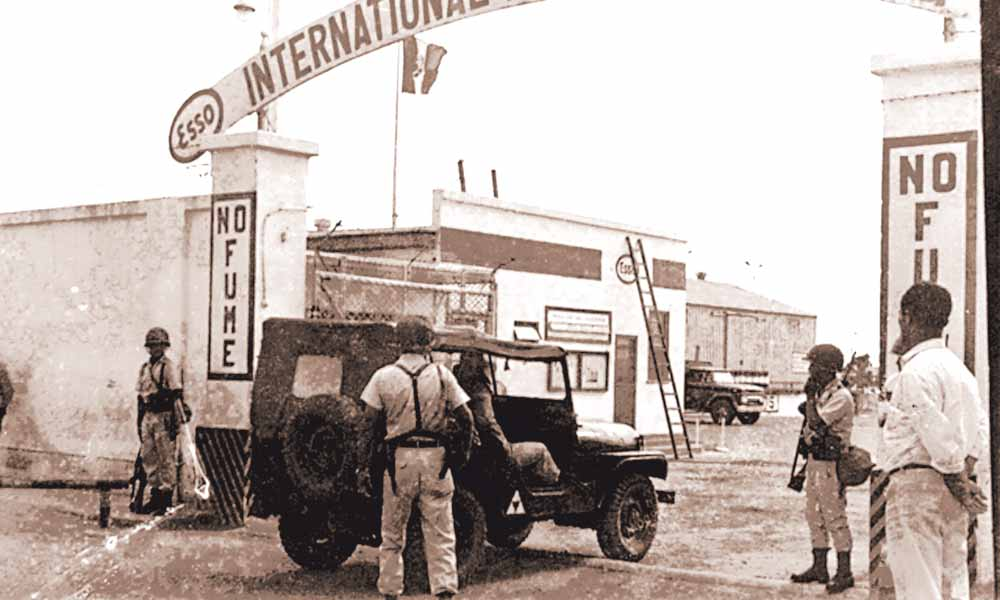
- Soldiers forcibly entering La Brea y Pariñas
- Native name: Toma de La Brea y Pariñas
- Date: October 9, 1968
- Location: La Brea and Pariñas, Peru
- Cause: Page 11 scandal
- Motive: Anti-Imperialism; Peruvian nationalism Velasquism
- Target: La Brea and Pariñas
- Perpetrator: Peruvian Army led by Juan Velasco Alvarado
- Property damage: none

On October 9, 1968, the Peruvian Army seized control of La Brea and Pariñas, an oil refinery in northern Peru, under the orders of Juan Velasco Alvarado's so-called Revolutionary Government of the Armed Forces. The events took place in response to the controversy surrounding the oil field, which led to a long-standing dispute between its owner, the International Oil Company, and the Peruvian government.

== Background ==
A long-standing controversy regarding the oil field began in 1911, as an administrative error had seriously understated the number of deposits (organised as event lots called pertenencias) in the oil field: the total number had been recorded as 10, but a survey carried out by engineers Héctor Boza and Alberto Jochamowitz found that the site had not 10 but no less than 41,614 pertenencias. The disagreement between the IPC and the Government regarding a newfound debt continued until 1968, when the Act of Talara was signed on August 13. Soon after it was signed, on September 10, Carlos Loret de Mola (resigning president of the Empresa Petrolera Fiscal) reported that the eleventh and final page was missing from the contract, allegedly containing valuable information about costs. The crisis served as a pretext for a group of army officers, led by General Juan Velasco Alvarado, to carry out a coup d'état less than a month later.

== Takeover ==
On October 9, 1968, the Revolutionary Government of the Armed Forces ordered the seizure of the IPC facilities in Talara, which was carried out by the forces of the First Military Region based in Piura, under the command of General Fermín Málaga. This event had a great impact on the country and helped the government to consolidate power. The date of October 9 was celebrated throughout the military government as the Day of National Dignity.

== Aftermath ==
Petroperú was created the following year by law decree issued by General Juan Velasco Alvarado on July 24, 1969. The newly created company was chaired by another General, Marco Fernández-Baca Carrasco and had to face the challenges of operating and maintaining the recently nationalised oil industry with local personnel. It had to do this without resources or technical support from global oil players, who had been alienated by the forced nationalisation of the military government.

The company and the government nevertheless had the assistance of Soviet technicians and were able to retain middle managers, surviving and even thriving despite reduced production capacity. Extraction and refining progressively increased owing to oilfield discoveries in the northern jungle (Loreto Department), association agreements that followed after Velasco's deposition by another coup in 1975, and the construction of the North Peruvian Pipeline.

== See also ==
- Revolutionary Government of the Armed Forces of Peru

== Sources ==
- Chirinos, Enrique (1985). Historia de la República. Vol. 1. De San Martín a Leguía (1821-1930) (3rd ed.). Lima: AFA Editores Importadores S.A.
