= Guillermo Arbulú Galliani =

Peruvian general and politician

Guillermo Arbulú Galliani (1 March 1921 – December 1997) was a Peruvian general and politician. He was born in Trujillo, Peru. He served as Ambassador of Peru to Spain and Chile. He studied at the Chorrillos Military School and the Center for Higher National Studies in Lima. He went briefly to the United States for further studies at Fort Belvoir, Virginia. He was promoted to brigadier general in 1971 and major general in 1975. He was Prime Minister of Peru (July 1976 – January 1978). He was simultaneously minister of war in the Government of Peru.

Preceded by Jorge Fernandez-Maldonado Solari	Minister of War of Peru; 16 July 1976 – 30 January 1978	Succeeded by Óscar Molina Pallochia
Preceded by Jorge Fernández Maldonado Solari	Prime Minister of Peru; 17 July 1976 – 30 January 1978	Succeeded by Óscar Molina Pallochia

== Publications ==
- El Ejército y la Ingeniería Militar en el Siglo XX (1988), en dos tomos, sobre la historia del Ejército y la Ingeniería Militar en el Perú del siglo XX.

== Sources ==
- Portal Institucional del Ejército del Perú: General de División Guillermo Arbulú Galliani. Consultado el 29 de agosto de 2012.
- Revista Caretas Nº 1498: Nobleza real / Falleció el general Guillermo Arbulú Galliani….
