= Ernesto Montagne Sánchez =

Peruvian politician and a Prime Minister

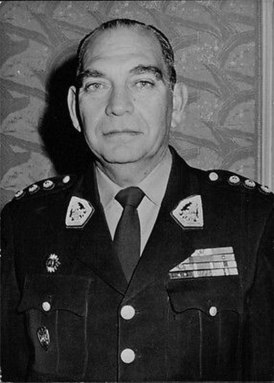

Prime Minister of Peru
- In office October 3, 1968 – January 31, 1973
- President: Juan Velasco Alvarado
- Preceded by: Miguel Mujica Gallo
- Succeeded by: Luis Edgardo Mercado Jarrín

Personal details
- Born: August 18, 1916 Lima, Peru
- Died: April 13, 1993 (aged 76)

Ernesto Montagne Sánchez (August 18, 1916 – April 13, 1993) was a Peruvian politician who served as the Prime Minister of Peru from October 3, 1968, to January 31, 1973. He was born on August 18, 1916, in Lima as the son of Ernesto Montagne Markholz.

Political offices
Preceded by Miguel Mujica Gallo	Prime Minister of Peru; 1968–1973	Succeeded by Luis Edgardo Mercado Jarrín
