= International Petroleum Company =

Former U.S. oil company that operated in Peru

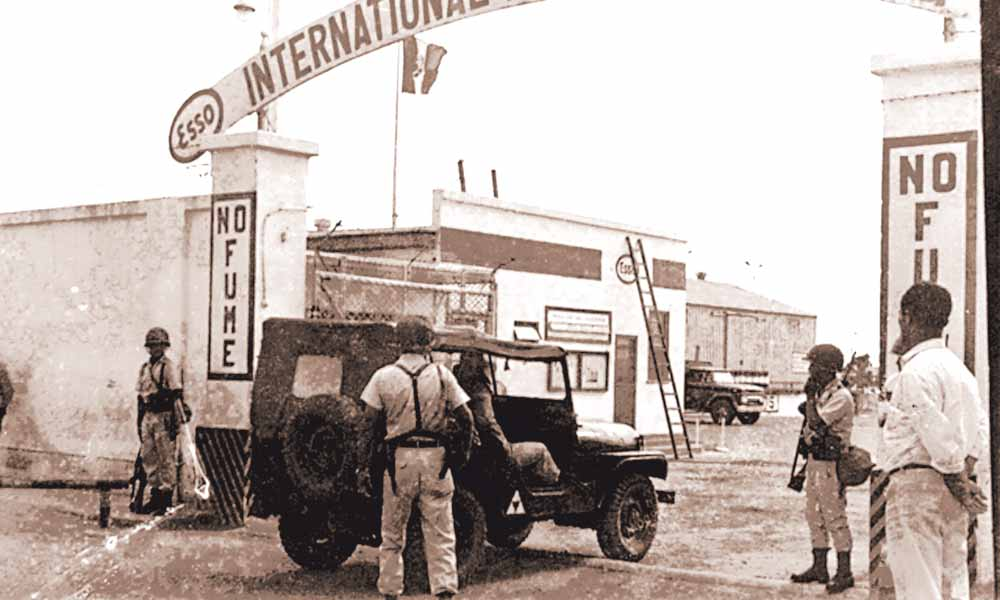
- Entrance to the refinery in Talara in 1968
- Product type: Gasoline, lubricants
- Current owner: Standard Oil of New Jersey
- Country: Peru
- Introduced: 1914; 112 years ago
- Discontinued: 1968; 58 years ago

International Petroleum Company, Ltd. (IPC) was a subsidiary of Standard Oil of New Jersey, based in Toronto, Canada. It began operating in Peru in 1914 to replace the British London Pacific Petroleum Company, and was active until 1969. In that country, it exploited the La Brea and Pariñas field (among others), establishing its processing centre and refinery in Talara for the production of petroleum derivatives.

== History ==
The company was the protagonist of a strong scandal when it refused to pay the full amount of taxes to which it was obliged, according to the Peruvian State. It even achieved advantageous exceptions thanks to successive pro-American governments. In August 1968, during the first government of Fernando Belaúnde, the "Act of Talara" was signed, by which the IPC returned the oil fields to the Peruvian State, but preserved the Talara Refinery and the fuel distribution network. Shortly after, the so-called "page eleven scandal" broke out, surrounding an alleged missing page of the crude oil sales contract between the state-owned Empresa Petrolera Fiscal (EPF) and the IPC, and the government was accused of furtively favoring the latter.

In that same year, after the coup d'état of October 3 that deposed Belaúnde and brought Juan Velasco Alvarado to power, the latter ordered the military takeover of the Talara facilities. IPC ceased its operations in the country, and its expropriated assets were transformed into Petróleos del Perú (Petroperú). However, the IPC never paid its debts to the State.

== See also ==
- La Brea y Pariñas
- Revolutionary Government of the Armed Forces of Peru
