= Jorge Fernández Maldonado Solari =

Peruvian soldier and politician

Jorge Fernández Maldonado Solari (May 29, 1922 – November 10, 2000) was a Peruvian soldier and politician. He was Prime Minister of Peru (January–July 1976). He was a member of the Senate of Peru (1985–1990). He served as minister of economy and finance and energy and mines (1969–1975) in the Government of Peru. He was a recipient of the Order of May.

Preceded by Óscar Vargas Prieto	Prime Minister of Peru; January 31 – July 16, 1976	Succeeded by Guillermo Arbulú Galliani
