= Raúl Ferrero Rebagliati =

Peruvian politician

Raúl Ferrero Rebagliati (20 September 1911 in Barranco, Lima – 22 April 1977 in Lima) was a Peruvian politician who served as 107th Prime Minister of Peru for six months in 1967 and 1968. He was Minister of Economy and Finance from January to March 1968. He was later Peru's Minister of Foreign Affairs.

The son of Alfredo and Amelia (Rebagliati) Ferrero, he was the fourth child of six children. In 1937, he married Yolanda Costa, the daughter of Carlo and Livia (Elice) Costa - they had 4 children: Yolanda, Raúl Enrique, Augusto and María Elena Ferrero.

As an academic and lawyer, Rebagliati served as Dean of the Faculty of Law at the Catholic University of Peru, Dean of Colegio de Abogados de Lima, and as a member of the Permanent Court of Arbitration of la Haya.

Politically, Ferrero was an early member of the Unión Revolucionaria which had initially been founded by Luis Miguel Sánchez Cerro in 1931 as the state party of his dictatorship. However following the assassination of Sánchez in 1933, the group came under the leadership of Luis A. Flores, who sought to mobilize mass support and even set up a Blackshirt movement in imitation of the Italian model. A heavy defeat in the 1936 elections shook confidence however and the movement faded. Ferrero later joined the Christian Democrat Party.

Political offices
Preceded by Edgardo Seoane Corrales	Prime Minister of Peru; 1967–1968	Succeeded by Oswaldo Hercelles García
