= Tacnazo =

1975 coup d'état in Peru

- Part of the Revolutionary Government of the Armed Forces of Peru
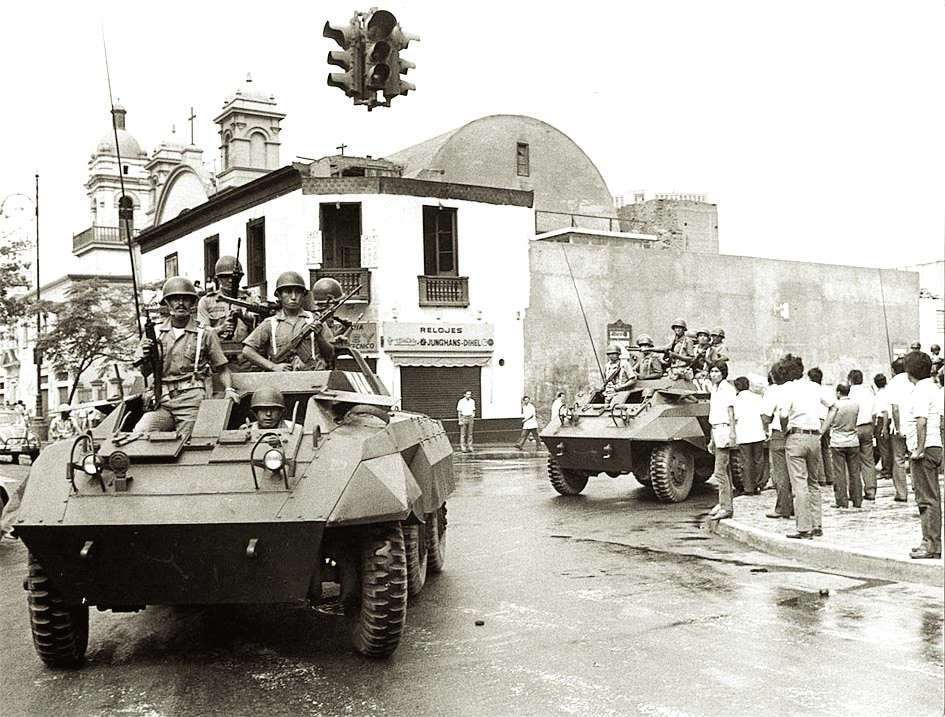
- The Peruvian Army drives in Lima during the coup
Date	29 August, 1975
Location	Tacna, Peru
Result	Coup successful: Velasco overthrown, second phase of the Revolutionary Government begins; Armed Forces are purged of pro-Velasco elements

Belligerents
Government of Peru	Armed Forces; Supported by: United States; Chile; Israel

Commanders and leaders
Juan Velasco Alvarado	Francisco Morales Bermúdez

The Tacnazo was a military coup launched by then Peruvian Prime Minister, General Francisco Morales Bermúdez against the administration of President Gen. Juan Velasco Alvarado in 1975. This led to what is known in Peru as the "Second Phase" of the Revolutionary Government of the Armed Forces, which lasted until the elections of 1980.

== Background ==
On February 5, 1975, there was a police strike and an attempted coup that turned into riots and looting in the historic center of Lima, which were then violently suppressed by the Peruvian Army. This event continued to destabilize the Velasco administration, already unstable after growing discontent and demands for economic reform from the public.

On the morning of Thursday, August 28, 1975, the annual ceremony commemorating the return of the Province of Tacna to Peru took place, with the presence of then Prime Minister Francisco Morales Bermúdez and the heads of the military and without the presence of President Juan Velasco Alvarado, who was in Lima.

== Coup ==
The coup was planned at the Tarapacá barracks as a military uprising in the southern city of Tacna, and was supported unanimously by several of the most prominent members of the Armed Forces. The next day, at 2:00 am, neighboring Chilean radios received the news regarding the coup.

After an improvised speech in the main square of Tacna, General Morales Bermúdez urged President Velasco to leave office peacefully and avoid a direct confrontation. President Velasco, already having come down with illness, resigned after realising that little could be done to resist. He died in 1977.

== Aftermath ==
The Morales Bermúdez administration proved unable to continue with the original leftist military government program. President Morales Bermúdez did not continue with what was supposed to be the "Revolution", but his own program, which was supposed to mitigate the pseudo-Communist experiments of Velasco's administration. A purge in the Army saw most of Velasco's supporters forced to resign or leave their commissions.

He was forced to call a Constitutional Assembly (which was led by Víctor Raúl Haya de la Torre) and new elections.

== See also ==
- 1968 Peruvian coup d'état
