= Juan Velasco Alvarado =

President of Peru from 1968 to 1975

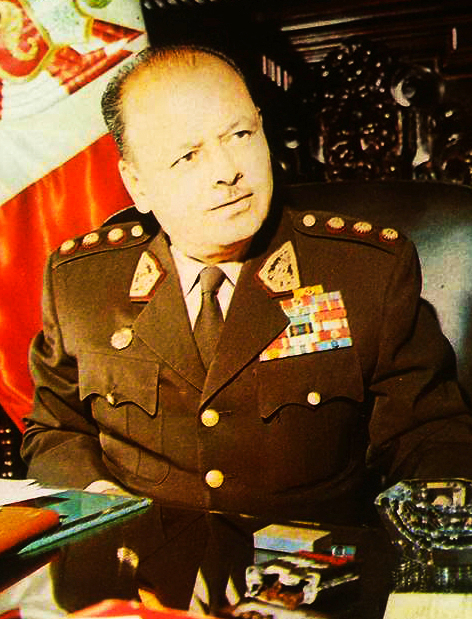

President of Peru
- 1st President of the Revolutionary; Government of the Armed Forces
- In office October 3, 1968 – August 30, 1975
- Prime Minister: Ernesto Montagne Sánchez; Luis Edgardo Mercado Jarrín; Francisco Morales Bermúdez
- Preceded by: Fernando Belaúnde
- Succeeded by: Francisco Morales Bermúdez

General Commander of the Peruvian Army
- In office 1967–1968
- President: Fernando Belaúnde Terry
- Preceded by: Julio Doig Sánchez
- Succeeded by: Ernesto Montagne Sánchez

Personal details
- Born: Juan Francisco Velasco Alvarado; June 16, 1910 Castilla, Peru
- Died: December 24, 1977 (aged 67) Lima, Peru
- Spouse: Consuelo Gonzales Posada (m. 1940)
- Profession: Military officer

Military service
- Allegiance: Peru
- Branch/service: Peruvian Army
- Rank: General
- Battles/wars: 1932 Trujillo uprising Ecuadorian-Peruvian War; 1968 Peruvian coup d'état Capture of La Brea y Pariñas

Juan Francisco Velasco Alvarado (Note: Spanish pronunciation: [ˌxwan fɾanˌsisko beˌlasko albaˈɾado]) (June 16, 1910 – December 24, 1977) was a Peruvian general and politician who was the military leader of Peru from 1968 to 1975 after a successful coup d'état against Fernando Belaúnde's presidency. Under his government, nationalism, as well as some left-wing economic policies specifically concerning Peru's indigenous population, such as nationalization or agrarian reform were adopted. These policies were reversed after another coup d'état in 1975 led by his Prime Minister, Francisco Morales Bermúdez.

Velasco had a confrontational foreign policy towards the United States, as he pushed for renegotiation of treaties and criticized what he perceived as a pernicious dependence of Latin American states on the United States and strengthened relations with the Soviet Union. His foreign policy has been described as "third way." His reign was also described by Western analysts as "fascistic", "corporatist" or populist. The government denied being fascistic however. Ideologically, he identified himself with socialism; once proclaiming that his government would be “a revolutionary government that is neither capitalist nor communist but authentically Peruvian—humanist, freedom loving, socialist and Christian.” Additionally, Velasco advocated what he called “ a social democracy of full participation.”

== Early life ==
Juan Velasco was born in Castilla, a city near Piura on Peru's north coast. He was the son of Manuel José Velasco, a medical assistant, and Clara Luz Alvarado, who had 11 children. Velasco described his youth as one of "dignified poverty, working as a shoeshine boy in Piura."

In 1929, he stowed away on a ship to Lima, Peru, falsified his age, and tried to enlist as an officer in the Peruvian Army. However, he arrived late to the exam, so he joined as a private on April 5, 1929. A year later, he took a competitive exam for entrance into the Escuela Militar de Chorrillos, and got the highest score of all applicants. In 1934, he graduated with high honors and at the head of his class.

He married Consuelo Gonzales Posada in 1940, with whom he had several children.

== Coup d'etat against President Fernando Belaunde ==
During the Fernando Belaúnde's administration (1963–1968), political disputes became a norm as he held no majority in Congress. Serious arguments between President Belaúnde and Congress, dominated by the APRA-UNO (Unión Nacional Odríista) coalition, and even between the President and his own Acción Popular (Popular Action) party were common. Congress went on to censure several cabinets of the Belaunde administration, and a general political instability was perceived.

Also, between 1964 and 1965 the army had been sent to deal with two military uprisings inspired by the Cuban Revolution. Through the use of guerrilla tactics, both the National Liberation Army (ELN) commanded by Héctor Béjar and Javier Heraud, and the Revolutionary Left Movement (MIR), led by an APRA militant, Luis de la Puente Uceda, and Guillermo Lobatón, tried to instigate a revolution, being unsuccessful. Nevertheless, these conflicts led several military officers to the most impoverished parts of the country, and after witnessing the reality of the country-side and studying the reasons which led to the uprisings, they began to consider social inequality and poverty as a danger to national security.

A dispute with the International Petroleum Company over licenses to the La Brea y Pariñas oil fields in northern Peru sparked a national scandal when a key page of a contract (the 11th) was found missing. The Armed Forces, fearing that this scandal might lead to another uprising or a takeover from the APRA party, seized absolute power and close down Congress, almost all of whose members were briefly incarcerated. General Velasco seized power on October 3, 1968, in a bloodless military coup, deposing the democratically elected administration of Fernando Belaúnde, under which he served as Commander of the Armed Forces. President Belaúnde was sent into exile. Initial reaction against the coup evaporated after five days when on October 8, 1968, the oil fields in dispute were taken over by the Army.

== Military dictatorship (1968–1975) ==
The coup leaders named their administration the Revolutionary Government of the Armed Forces, with Velasco at its helm as President. Velasco's administration articulated a desire to give justice to the poor through a regime of nationalization known as Peruanismo. Velasco's rule was characterized by broadly social democratic, developmentalist, and independent nationalist policies, which aimed to create a strong national industry to increase the international independence of Peru. To that end, he nationalised entire industries, expropriated companies in a wide range of activities from fisheries to mining to telecommunications to power production and consolidated them into single industry-centric government-run entities, (Note: A few examples were as follows: PescaPeru; MineroPeru; Petroperú; SiderPeru; Centromin Peru; ElectroPeru; Enapu; EnatruPeru; Enafer; Compañía Peruana de Teléfonos; EntelPeru; Correos del Peru) and increased government control over economic activity by enforcing those entities as monopolies and disincentivized private activity in those sectors. Most reforms were planned by leftist intellectuals of the time.

The cabinets that Velasco led were ideologically diverse, with the cabinet (according to one study) dominated by conservatives during the first six months of his presidency. In early 1969, a cabinet reshuffle took place which resulted in just over half of its members (including Velasco himself) being radicals or other allies of the president.

A root and branch education reform was implemented, seeking to promote inclusivity among all Peruvians and move them towards to a new national way of thinking and feeling; the poor and the most excluded were prioritized in this system. The Día del Indio or Peruvian Indian's day became Día del Campesino or Peruvian Peasant's day. This holiday fell on June 24, a traditional holiday of the land, since it was the day of winter solstice.

The education reform of 1972 provided for bilingual education for the indigenous people of the Andes and the Amazon, which consisted nearly half of the population. In 1975, the Velasco government enacted a law making Quechua an official language of Peru equal to Spanish. However, this law was never enforced and ceased to be valid when the 1979 constitution became effective, according to which Quechua and Aymara are official only where they predominate, as mandated by law – a law that was never enacted. Major reforms were also carried out in the areas of social services, labor rights, and social security during Velasco's time in office.

A cornerstone of Velasco's political and economic strategy was the implementation by dictate of an agrarian reform program to expropriate farms and diversify land ownership. In its first ten years in power, the Revolutionary Government expropriated 15,000 properties (totaling nine million hectares) and benefited some 300,000 families. Peru's agrarian reform under Velasco was the second-largest Land reform in Latin American history, after Cuba. The former landlords who opposed this program believed that they did not receive adequate compensation for their confiscated assets and lamented that the state officials and peasant beneficiaries mismanaged their properties after the expropriation. The owners who opposed his program also claimed that the expropriation was more akin to confiscation, as they were paid in agrarian reform bonds, a sovereign debt obligation of which the government defaulted payment due to the hyperinflationary period that affected Peru's economy in the late 1980s, leaving the current value of the bonds up for debate and resulting in a decade-long lawsuit against the Peruvian government.

The deposed Belaúnde administration had attempted to implement a milder agrarian reform program, but it was defeated in Congress by the APRA-UNO coalition with support of the major landowners. Within this framework, the Velasco administration engaged in a program of import substitution industrialization, imposing tight foreign exchange and trade controls.

In his rhetoric, Velasco said to be working against the oligarchy in Peru.

The success of the Velasco administration's economic policies is still debated today. As the Peruvian military government ran deeper into debt, it was forced to devalue the currency and run inflationary policies. This however, was in part due to the 1970s energy crisis, which also affected Peru and made it impossible for the Velasco administration to fund some of its most ambitious reforms. Economic growth under the administration was steady if unremarkable - real per capita GDP (constant 2000 US$) increased 3.2% per year from 1968 to 1975.

In 1971, Velasco described the economic policy as one aimed at overcoming capitalism in Peru, stating that

The various laws that create Labor Communities constitute, as a whole, the reform of the traditional capitalist company. Its frame of reference is, therefore, the existing production system in the country, that is, the totality of economic companies. In this field, the revolutionary reforms tend to substantially modify the traditional relations of property and production. At the same time that it considers promotional measures for the development of the economic companies as such, the revolutionary legislation guarantees the gradual but sure access of all the workers to the profits, the direction and the property of the companies. In this way we promote the economic development of the country and, at the same time, we reform the traditional capitalist company, according to the principles and postulates of the Revolution that the Armed Forces promised the country in its Manifesto of October 3, 1968. Without However, here have arisen, as in the case of the Agrarian Reform, the understandable difficulties of understanding inherent to all truly creative work. That is why it is also my responsibility, as head of the Revolutionary Government, to specify our position clearly in this regard. First of all, we have never hidden our intention to start building a non-capitalist society. Consequently, no one should be surprised that our economic policy is aimed at overcoming capitalism as a system in Peru and, therefore, at reforming the structure of Peruvian capitalist companies as profoundly as necessary.

In a 1975 speech Velasco described his revolution as one that rejected both capitalism and communism, stating that

there is marked confusionism in the public treatment of fundamental ideological problems. This confusion originates from the mistaken statements of those who do not understand what our Revolution really means. But all his adversaries take advantage of him. Central responsibility for all of this falls on some elements that have distorted and confused the true nature of the Revolution, both with regard to our position against capitalism and communism, as well as with regard to our relations with traditional political groups and parties who defend both systems. Both are important issues. And to them I must refer clearly. I reiterate once again that our Revolution seeks to build a social, economic and political order essentially different from the one proposed by the capitalist and communist models. Apart from this fundamental difference in purpose, there are decisive differences in political strategy, method and behavior with those who maintain the validity of these systems. In short, we have nothing essential in common, from the theoretical-ideological point of view, neither with capitalism nor with communism. Politically, this means that within the Peruvian Revolution we cannot adopt any attitude that directly or indirectly favors, in the present, or in the future, the maintenance or triumph of the systems that it challenges. In other words, by rejecting capitalism, we reject all possible pro-capitalisms. And by rejecting communism, we reject all possible pro-communisms.

Velasco’s views on capitalism were echoed by his economy minister Francisco Morales Bermúdez, who argued that “it is impossible to achieve the general welfare of the population under a capitalist system.”

== Foreign and military policies ==
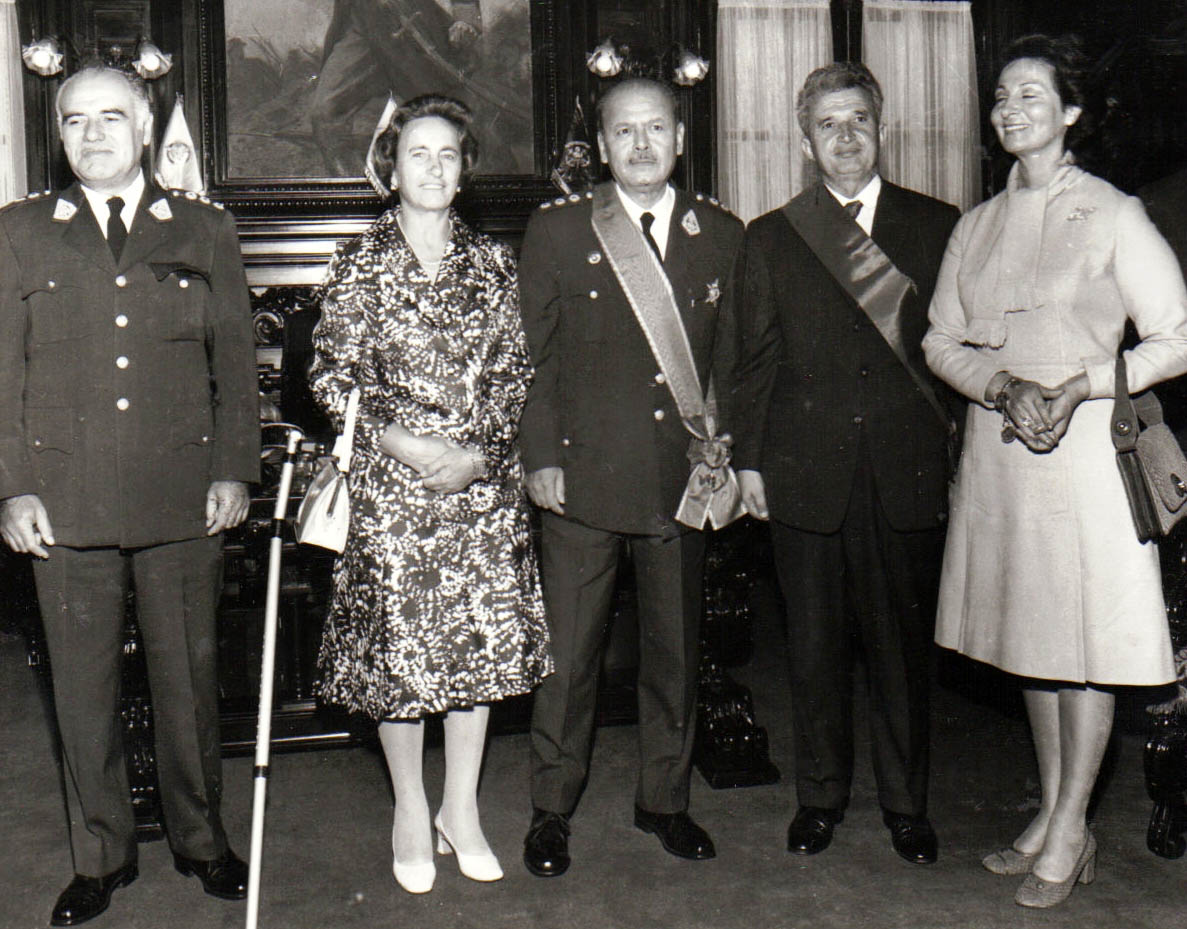
General Velasco meeting with President Nicolae Ceaușescu of Romania, in 1973.

In foreign policy, in contrast with his 1970s Latin American contemporaries, which were mostly right-wing military dictatorships, he pursued a partnership with the Soviet bloc, tightening relations with Cuba and Fidel Castro and undertaking major purchases of Soviet military hardware.

Relations between the United States and Peru were tense and even hostile, as soon as General Velasco and his junta took power. This was due to the government's socialist-leaning policies, but also because of a belief on the part of the Peruvian public that the U.S. generally favored other nations first, such as Chile in the context of their territorial dispute (in spite of its support of Peru over the Tarata dispute), or Colombia, in the context of the United States' mediation in favor of the Salomon-Lozano Treaty in order to compensate the country for its loss of Panama.

Just five days after Velasco seized power in 1968, the General began the nationalization of the Peruvian economy with the expropriation and nationalization of the American International Petroleum Company (IPC) oil fields located in the northern Peruvian oil port and refinery of Talara, Piura, near the Peruvian border with Ecuador, Piura being the region where Velasco was born. The IPC expropriation was one of the first foreign policy crises for the new American administration of President Richard Nixon. John N. Irwin II was appointed special Ambassador to negotiate a solution and recommended against formal application of sanctions required by U.S. law. Eventually, the dispute was resolved in the context of a broader claims agreement so formulated as to permit Peru to maintain the position that it had not agreed to compensate IPC.

US–Peru disagreements continued over a broad range of issues including even Peru's claim to a 200-mile fishing limit that resulted in the seizure of several US commercial fishing boats and the expropriation of the American copper mining company Cerro de Pasco Corporation. However, in spite of these provocations, the U.S. responded immediately with humanitarian aid in 1970, when an earthquake killed about 50,000 people and left over 600,000 homeless.

=== Chile ===
Another main goal of the Velasco administration, besides the nationalization of the main areas of the Peruvian economy and the agrarian reforms, was a military strengthening of Peru. Despite Chilean fears that Velasco planned on reconquering the lands lost by Peru to Chile in the War of the Pacific, such claims have been since disputed. It is estimated that from 1970 to 1975 Peru spent up to US$2 billion (roughly US$25 billion in 2021 dollars) on Soviet armament. According to various sources Velasco's government bought between 600 and 1200 T-55 Main Battle Tanks, APCs, 60 to 90 Sukhoi 22 warplanes, 500,000 assault rifles, and even considered the purchase of the British Centaur-class light fleet carrier HMS Bulwark.

The enormous amount of weaponry purchased by Peru caused a meeting between former US Secretary of State Henry Kissinger and Chilean US-backed dictator General Augusto Pinochet in 1976. In 1999, Pinochet claimed that if Peru had attacked Chile during 1973 or even 1978, Peruvian forces could have penetrated deep south into Chilean territory, possibly militarily taking the Chilean city of Copiapó located half way on the way to Santiago. The Chilean Armed Forces considered launching a preventive war to defend itself. However, Pinochet's Chilean Air Force commander General Fernando Matthei opposed a preventive war and responded that "I can guarantee that the Peruvians would destroy the Chilean Air Force in the first five minutes of the war". Some analysts believe the fear of attack by Chilean and US officials as largely unjustified but logical for them to experience, considering the Pinochet dictatorship had come into power with a coup against democratically elected president Salvador Allende. According to sources, the alleged invasion scheme could be seen from the Chilean military regime’s perspective as a plan for some kind of leftist counterattack. While acknowledging the Peruvian plans were revisionistic, scholar Kalevi J. Holsti claim more important issues behind were the "ideological incompatibility" between the regimes of Velasco Alvarado and Pinochet and that Peru would have been concerned about Pinochet's geopolitical views on Chile's need of naval hegemony in the Southeastern Pacific.

Chileans should stop with the bullshit or tomorrow I shall eat breakfast in Santiago.

—Juan Velasco Alvarado

== Overthrow ==
Economic difficulties such as inflation, unemployment, food shortages and increased political opposition after the 1974 crackdown on the press ultimately increased pressures on the Velasco administration and led to its downfall. On August 29, 1975, a number of prominent military commanders initiated a coup in the southern city of Tacna, nicknamed the Tacnazo.

The military commanders of the 1st, 2nd, 3rd, 4th, and 5th military regions declared that Velasco had not achieved most of what the "Peruvian Revolution" had stood for and was unable to continue in his functions. Prime Minister Francisco Morales Bermúdez was then appointed president, by unanimous decision of the new military junta.

Prior to being deposed, Velasco had been seriously ill for at least a year. He had lost a leg to an embolism, and his cognitive abilities and personality were rumoured to have been affected by related circulatory problems. At the time of the coup, he was convalescing in the presidential winter residence at Chaclacayo, countryside 20 kilometers east of Lima. He immediately called for a meeting with his council of ministers, at Government Palace in downtown Lima, where he discovered that there was little or nothing to do. He made a last speech to the nation on the evening of August 29, 1975, announcing his decision not to resist the coup because "Peruvians cannot fight against each other".

== Death and legacy ==
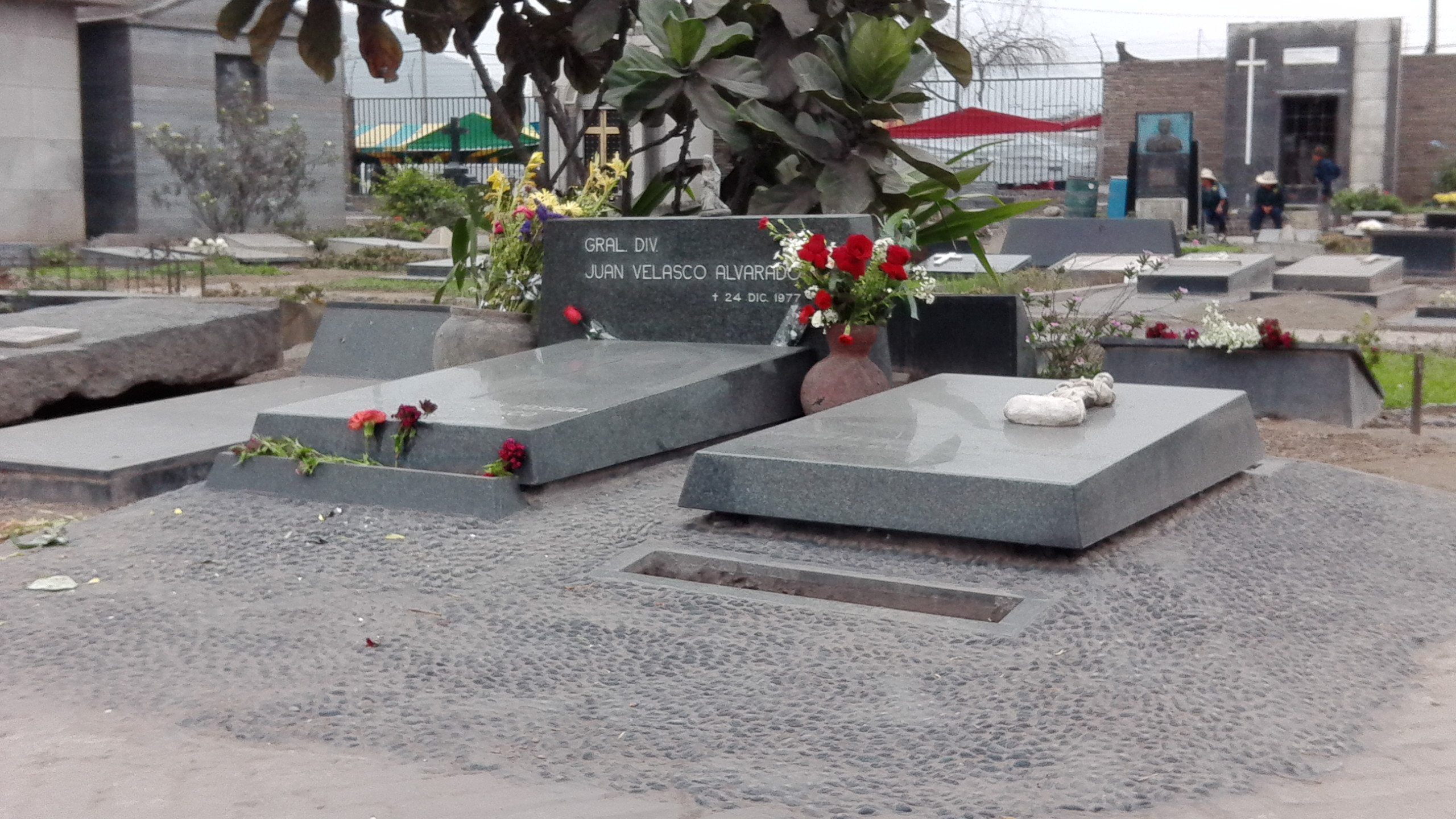
Grave of General Velasco.

General Velasco kept a low profile in Peruvian politics until his death in 1977. His funeral was attended by a large amount of sympathizers to the point where the government had to release a communiqué requesting order during the event.

Due to the international market moving away from Peruvian exports in the 1970s, efforts by Velasco to solidify industries of typical exports were fruitless and resulted with a debt burden. Furthermore, his government is partly responsible for the centralization of the country. After the agrarian reform, urbanization began occurring across the country, as people moved into Lima and other coastal cities. The Velasco government's failure to adequately manage the influx of people, as well as the indifference of subsequent governments to the issue, contributed to the creation of slums around Peru's cities.

In 1974, a then relatively unknown Hugo Chávez and around one dozen fellow cadets and soldiers, all youths, traveled to Ayacucho, Peru to celebrate the 150th anniversary of the eponymous battle. There, they were personally greeted by General Velasco. Velasco gave each of them a miniature pocket edition of La Revolución Nacional Peruana ("The Peruvian National Revolution"). The cadets also noted Velasco's perceived close relationship with both the Peruvian masses and the rank and file of the Peruvian military. Chávez became attached to this book and would study its contents and constantly carry it on his person. However, Chávez later lost it after his arrest for leading the 1992 Venezuelan coup attempt. Twenty-five years later, as president, Chávez ordered the printing of millions of copies of his government's new Bolivarian Constitution only in the form of miniature blue booklets, a partial tribute to Velasco's gift.

== See also ==
- Land reforms by country
- Plan Inca
- David Toro

== Notes ==
Military offices
Preceded by Gral. Julio Doig Sánchez	Commander-in-Chief of the Army; September 1967 – October 1968	Succeeded by Gral. Ernesto Montagne Sánchez
Political offices
Preceded by Fernando Belaúnde	President of Peru (1st President of the Revolutionary Government of the Armed Forces) of Peru; October 1968 – August 1975	Succeeded by Francisco Morales Bermúdez
