= 1968 Peruvian coup d'état =

October 1968 event

- Part of the Page 11 Scandal and the Cold War
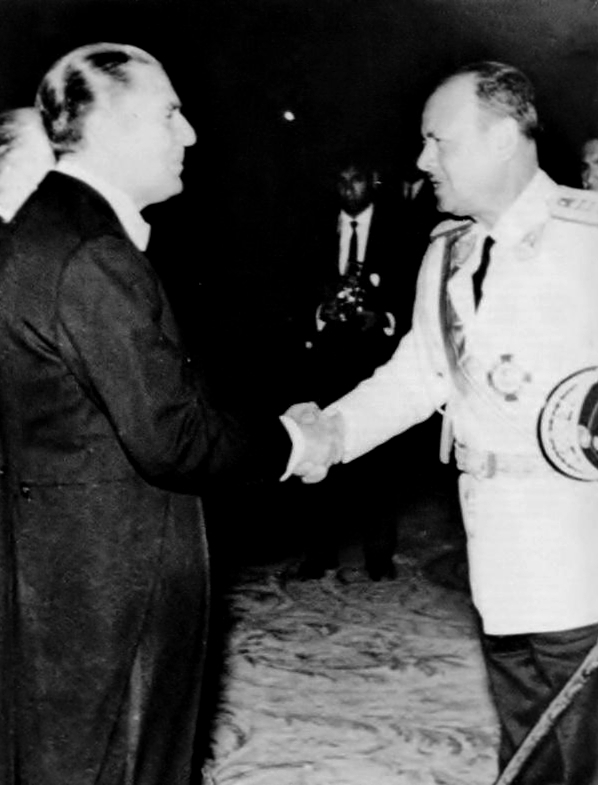
- Juan Velasco Alvarado and Belaunde hours before the coup
Date	3 October 3, 1968
Location	Palacio de Gobierno, Lima
Result	Successful coup; Overthrow and deportation of Fernando Belaúnde Terry to Argentina.; Capture of La Brea y Pariñas in Talara.; Juan Velasco Alvarado becomes President of Peru and start the Government Revolutionary of the Armed Forces.

Belligerents
Government of Peru; Supported by: United States; Chile; Israel	Armed Forces of Peru

Commanders and leaders
Fernando Belaúnde Terry (POW)	Juan Velasco Alvarado; Francisco Morales-Bermúdez; Rafael Hoyos Rubio

The 1968 Peruvian coup d'état, also called Nationalist Revolution or Peruvian Revolution (Spanish: Revolución Nacionalista or Revolución Peruana) took place during the first presidency of Fernando Belaúnde (1963–1968) as a result of political disputes becoming the norm, serious arguments between President Belaúnde and Congress, dominated by the APRA-UNO (Unión Nacional Odríista) coalition, and even clashes between the president and his own Acción Popular (Popular Action) party. Congress went on to censor several cabinets of the Belaúnde administration, and a general political instability was perceived. General Juan Velasco Alvarado led the coup.

== Context ==
A dispute with the International Petroleum Company over licenses to the La Brea y Pariñas oil fields in Talara Province, northern Peru, sparked a national scandal when a key page of a contract (the 11th) was found missing. The Armed Forces, fearing that this scandal might lead to another uprising or a takeover from the APRA party, seized absolute power and closed down Congress, almost all of whose members were briefly incarcerated. General Velasco seized power on October 3, 1968, in a bloodless military coup, deposing the democratically elected administration of Fernando Belaúnde, under which he served as Commander of the Armed Forces. President Belaúnde was put on a plane to Argentina, where he was sent into exile. Initial reaction against the coup evaporated after five days when, on October 8, 1968, the oil fields in dispute were taken over by the Army.

== Coup d'état ==
At 1:00 AM on Thursday, October 3, 1968, an armored squadron of tanks went from the Tank Division towards the Presidential Palace in the capital city of Lima, along with support from the armed forces. The intention was to avoid confrontation with the palace guards with an early attack.

Although rumors of a coup and of a possible overthrow circulated around the Council of Ministers and Presidential Cabinet, no special measures were taken in the event of defending the palace from mutiny.

Additionally, due to the early timing, the chief military aide to President Belaúnde was still sleeping at his home away from the Presidential Palace, and the Presidential Guards immediately surrendered at the sight of the armored squadron at the steps of the pavilion.

At 2 AM, President Belaúnde was woken up and dragged out of his bed in his pajamas by Velasco-Alvarado and his militants. Belaúnde offered no resistance. Close advisers to Belaúnde also reportedly saw him as being drugged the night before the coup, presumably by traitors in the presidential residence itself.

== Ousting of Belaúnde Terry ==
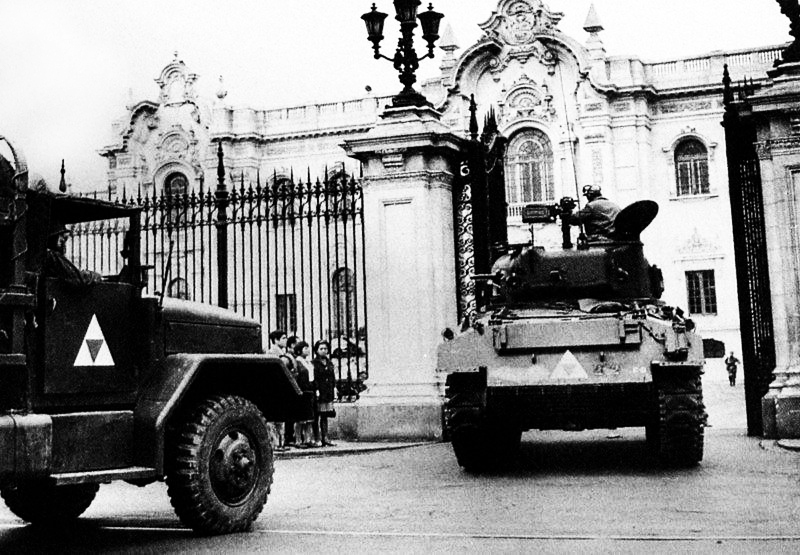
Military vehicles in Lima during the coup

After hearing a barrage of bullets outside the palace in the morning, Belaúnde found himself alone in the Presidential Palace along with a couple of other family members and ministers.

In the morning, a group of officers found Belaunde and informed him of his arrest at gunpoint. Belaúnde, furious, exclaimed, "Identify yourself, you miserable traitor. You are talking to the Constitutional President of the Republic!" The group backed off, and Colonel Enrique Gallegos explained Velasco's orders for his deportation to him.

Belaúnde responded, "You sons of...traitors...unworthy of the uniform that the country has entrusted to you. You are dismissed! Bringing so many tanks and guns just to detain an unarmed man! Shoot me then, damn it!"

President Belaúnde attempted to resist arrest. Four officers threw themselves at President Belaúnde, taking him by the arms and holding him back. He was then detained.

Following the coup d'état, at 7 AM, Belaúnde was taken to a barracks and was forcibly taken to Jorge Chavez International Airport in Callao, Peru. Velasco, having assumed authority, immediately ordered Belaúnde to be deported and ordered an APSA jet to the runway of the airport.

Belaúnde was forced into the jet, and the exiled president was deported to Argentina. Belaúnde would spend the next years of Velasco's regime in both Argentina and the United States as a professor.

== Council of Ministers ==
The President of the Council of Ministers, as well as many other ministers, was rushed at their homes and the presidential palace. They immediately surrendered.

Prior to being attacked and hearing of Belaúnde's arrest, the President of the Council of Ministers attempted to establish order by calling an emergency Cabinet meeting to swear in the Vice President, Mario Polar. The insurgents detained the vice president, while only three ministers attended.

== Aftermath ==
Immediately after the coup, the military nationalized the International Petroleum Company. This set off a dispute between Peru and the United States, with the United States seeking compensation.
