= Talara =

- City
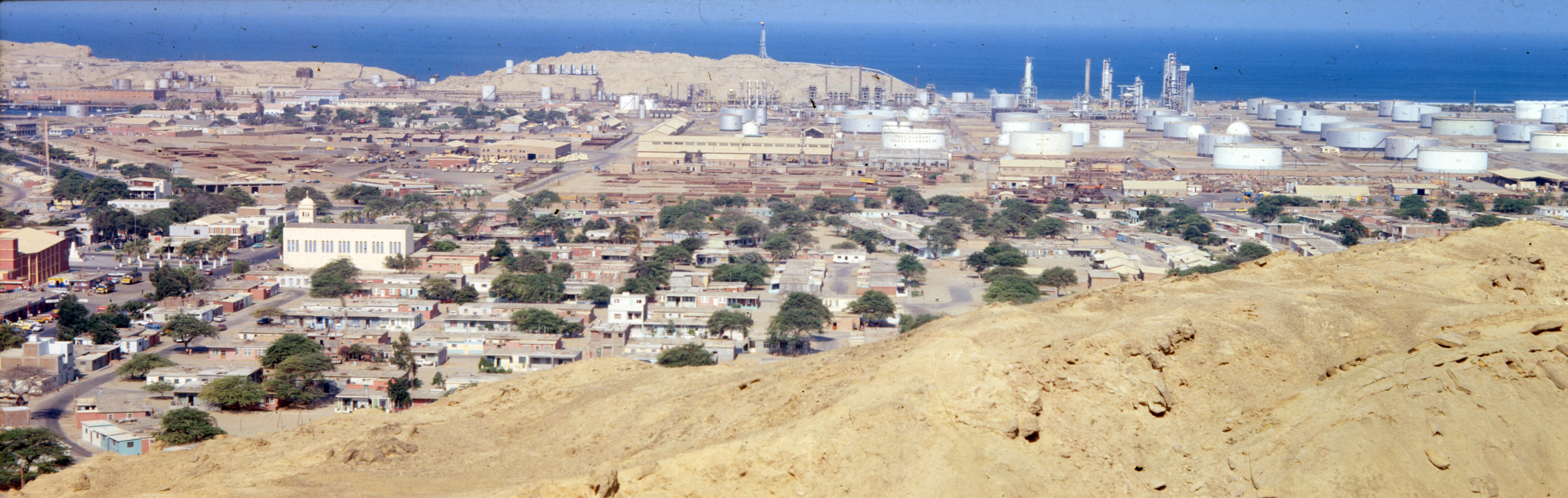
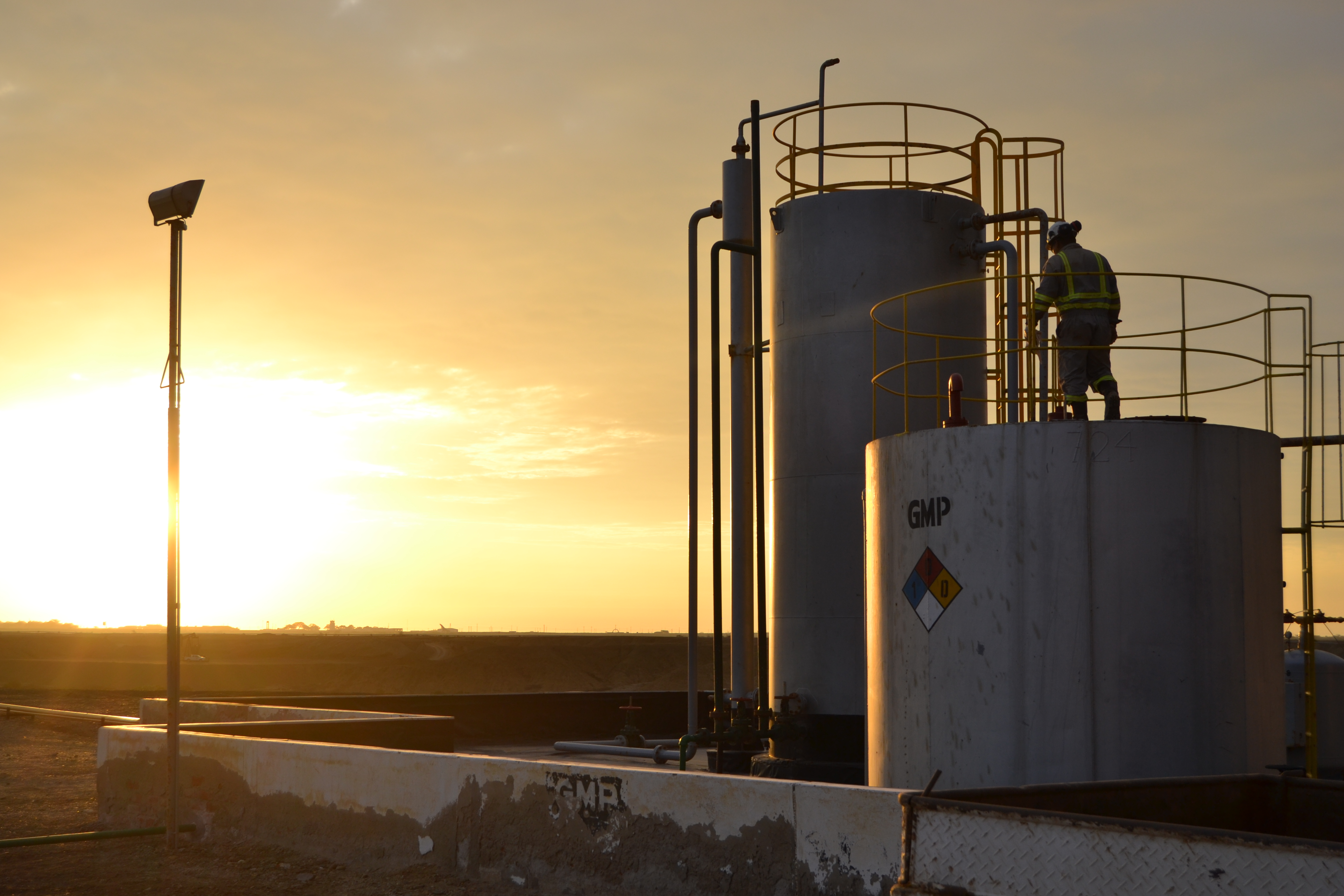
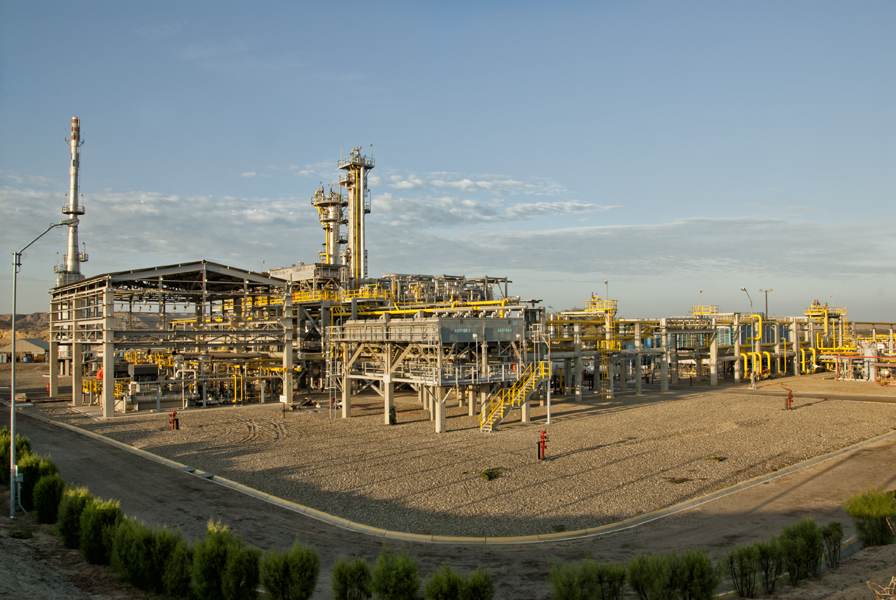
- Talara

- Location within Peru
- Coordinates: 4°34′47.65″S 81°16′18.76″W
- Country: Peru
- Region: Piura
- Province: Talara

Government
  - Type: Democracy
  - Mayor: José Alfredo Vitonera Infante
- Elevation: 11 m (36 ft)

Population (2017)
  - Total: 91,444
  - Estimate (2015): 90,830
- Time zone: UTC-5 (PET)
  - Summer (DST): UTC-5 (PET)
- Website: www.munitalara.gob.pe

Talara is a city in the Talara Province of the Piura Region, in northwestern Peru. It is a port city on the Pacific Ocean with a population of 91,444 as of 2017. Its climate is hot and dry. Due to its oil reserves, and ability to produce aviation fuel, Talara hosted a United States air base during World War II. It was also one of two refueling stations for the Pacific Fleet. There were naval guns on the hills, and submarine nets in the harbor. The Ajax, Achilles and Exeter, three British destroyers, were refuelled there on their way around the Horn to catch the Graf Spee in Rio de la Plata. Talara is also home to a large fishing fleet. The city is served by the Cap. FAP Víctor Montes Arias Airport.

Talara is the westernmost city in all of mainland South America. (A small outlying town, Seccion Dieciocho, is situated slightly further west, and just beyond there, the land itself reaches its westernmost extent at Punta Pariñas.) Talara and some neighbouring cities (Piura and Amotape) served as the backdrop for the short novel Who Killed Palomino Molero? by Mario Vargas Llosa.

== History ==
The contemporary history of Talara was profoundly shaped by the presence of the International Petroleum Company (IPC), a branch of the Standard Oil of New Jersey, that started its operations in the city during the decade of 1920. Its arrival implied a structural change in the economy, urbanism, and the social dynamics in the region.

In 1924, the IPC took control of oil operations in Talara after acquiring the assets of Lobitos Oilfield Limited, consolidating its presence in northwestern Peru. This transaction gave the company control over extensive extraction areas, as well as the Talara refinery, one of the most important in the country. The company also established a network of pipelines, port facilities, and other logistical infrastructure intended to facilitate the extraction and export of crude oil.

The city experienced accelerated economic growth and a significant urban transformation. The IPC implemented an urban model based on the separation of spaces according to occupational and ethnic hierarchies: on the one hand, an “American town” was built for foreign technical and administrative personnel, with modern housing, exclusive services, social clubs, and recreational facilities. On the other hand, Peruvian workers, mostly laborers and technicians, lived in peripheral areas with limited access to these benefits.

== Geography ==
=== Climate ===
Climate data for Talara
Month	Jan	Feb	Mar	Apr	May	Jun	Jul	Aug	Sep	Oct	Nov	Dec	Year
Mean daily maximum °C (°F)	30.0 (86.0)	30.7 (87.3)	30.8 (87.4)	30.2 (86.4)	28.2 (82.8)	26.2 (79.2)	24.7 (76.5)	24.2 (75.6)	24.2 (75.6)	24.5 (76.1)	25.7 (78.3)	27.7 (81.9)	27.3 (81.1)
Daily mean °C (°F)	24.8 (76.6)	25.7 (78.3)	26.0 (78.8)	25.3 (77.5)	23.4 (74.1)	21.6 (70.9)	20.4 (68.7)	19.9 (67.8)	19.8 (67.6)	20.1 (68.2)	21.0 (69.8)	22.7 (72.9)	22.6 (72.6)
Mean daily minimum °C (°F)	19.7 (67.5)	20.8 (69.4)	21.2 (70.2)	20.3 (68.5)	18.7 (65.7)	17.1 (62.8)	16.1 (61.0)	15.6 (60.1)	15.5 (59.9)	15.7 (60.3)	16.4 (61.5)	17.7 (63.9)	17.9 (64.2)
Average rainfall mm (inches)	1.7 (0.07)	1.1 (0.04)	6.7 (0.26)	0.7 (0.03)	0.0 (0.0)	0.1 (0.00)	0.0 (0.0)	0.0 (0.0)	0.0 (0.0)	0.4 (0.02)	0.1 (0.00)	0.1 (0.00)	10.9 (0.43)
Source: Senamhi

== See also ==
- 2005 Northern Peru earthquake
- Talara Refinery
