= Honduras–Peru relations =

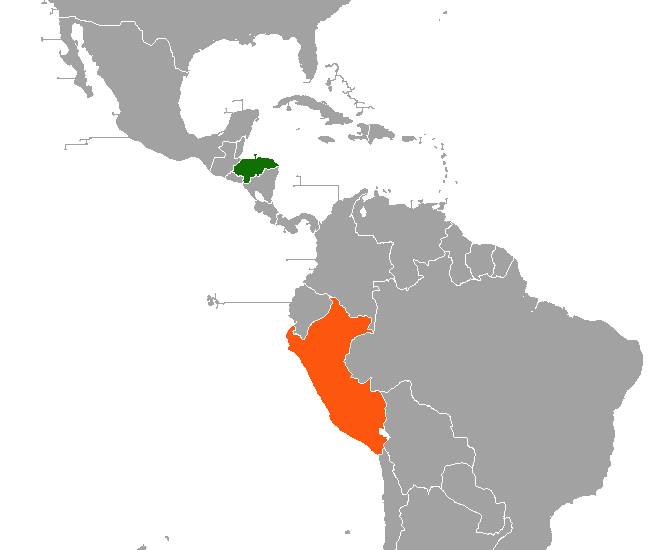

- Honduras: Peru

Diplomatic mission
- Embassy of Honduras, Lima: Embassy of Peru, Tegucigalpa

Honduras and Peru have long-standing bilateral and historical relations. Both countries are members of the United Nations (and its Group of 77), the Community of Latin American and Caribbean States, the Latin Union, the Association of Academies of the Spanish Language, the Organization of American States, and the Organization of Ibero-American States.

Prior to 2023, relations between both countries were described as friendly.

== History ==
Both states were formerly part of the Spanish Empire and formally established relations in 1857, during the Filibuster War.

In July 1966, El Salvador and Honduras went to war for 100 hours as a result of a football (soccer) match, also known as the Football War. Although the war was brief, relations between both nations remained strained for more than a decade. In 1977, both nations appointed former Peruvian President, José Bustamante y Rivero, as a mediator for peace negotiations between El Salvador and Honduras. On 30 October 1980, eleven years after the war, the two nations signed a peace treaty in Lima, Peru and agreed to resolve the border dispute over the Gulf of Fonseca and five sections of land boundary through the International Court of Justice (ICJ).

Both countries became briefly involved in an international incident when Honduran ambassador Eduardo Martell was among the hostages of the Japanese embassy hostage crisis in late 1996.

Peru recalled its ambassador from Honduras after Honduran president Xiomara Castro demanded the release of Pedro Castillo from prison during the 2023 CELAC summit, referring to Castillo as the "legitimate president of Peru."

== High-level visits ==
High-level visits from Honduras to Peru

- President Juan Orlando Hernandez (2015)

== Resident diplomatic missions ==
- Honduras has an embassy in Lima.
- Peru has an embassy in Tegucigalpa.

== See also ==
- Foreign relations of Honduras
- Foreign relations of Peru
- List of ambassadors of Honduras to Peru
- List of ambassadors of Peru to Central America
- List of ambassadors of Peru to Honduras
