= Nicaragua–Peru relations =

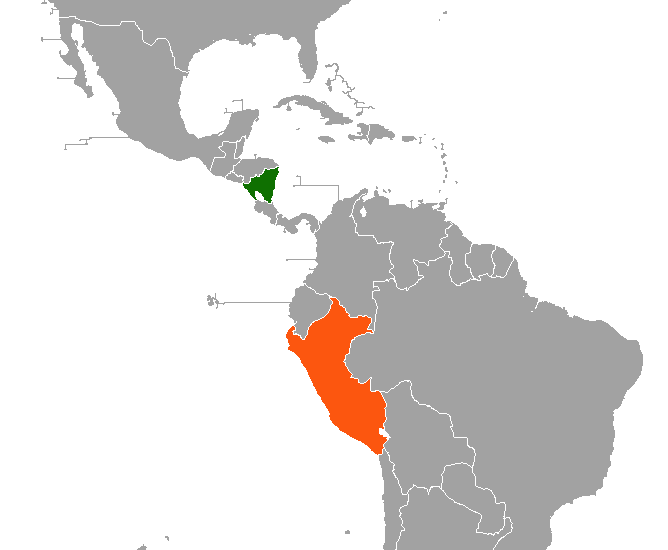

- Nicaragua: Peru

Diplomatic mission
- Embassy of Nicaragua, Lima: Embassy of Peru, Managua

Nicaragua and Peru established diplomatic relations in 1857. The two countries have a shared history due to being part of the Spanish Empire. Both countries are members of the United Nations (and its Group of 77), the Community of Latin American and Caribbean States, the Latin Union, the Association of Academies of the Spanish Language, the Organization of American States, and the Organization of Ibero-American States.

== History ==
Both states were formerly part of the Spanish Empire and formally established relations in 1857, during the Filibuster War.

During the Nicaraguan Revolution, the Andean Pact, of which Peru is a member of, released a communiqué urging acting president Francisco Urcuyo to allow for a peaceful transfer of power, rejecting his refusal to transfer power to the Junta of National Reconstruction.

In June 2009, Nicaragua granted political asylum to indigenous rights activist Alberto Pizango. A month later, the Peruvian government protested that Pizango was allowed to make public declarations against the Peruvian government, despite him not legally being allowed to do so.

Negotiations for a free trade agreement between both countries was resumed in January 2021. As of 2023, they are not yet concluded.

During the 2021 Peruvian general election, Nicaraguan president Daniel Ortega (as well as Bolivian counterpart Luis Arce) congratulated candidate Pedro Castillo prior to the election's conclusion and an official announcement of its winner, which led to the Peruvian government sending a formal letter of protest to its Nicaraguan and Bolivian counterparts. Months later, Peru was one of several countries to speak publicly against the 2021 Nicaraguan general election, with politicians and the Ministry of Foreign Affairs claiming that they were a sham which "threatened democracy."

In 2022, Nicaragua recalled its ambassadors in Colombia and Peru without an official explanation.

== High-level visits ==
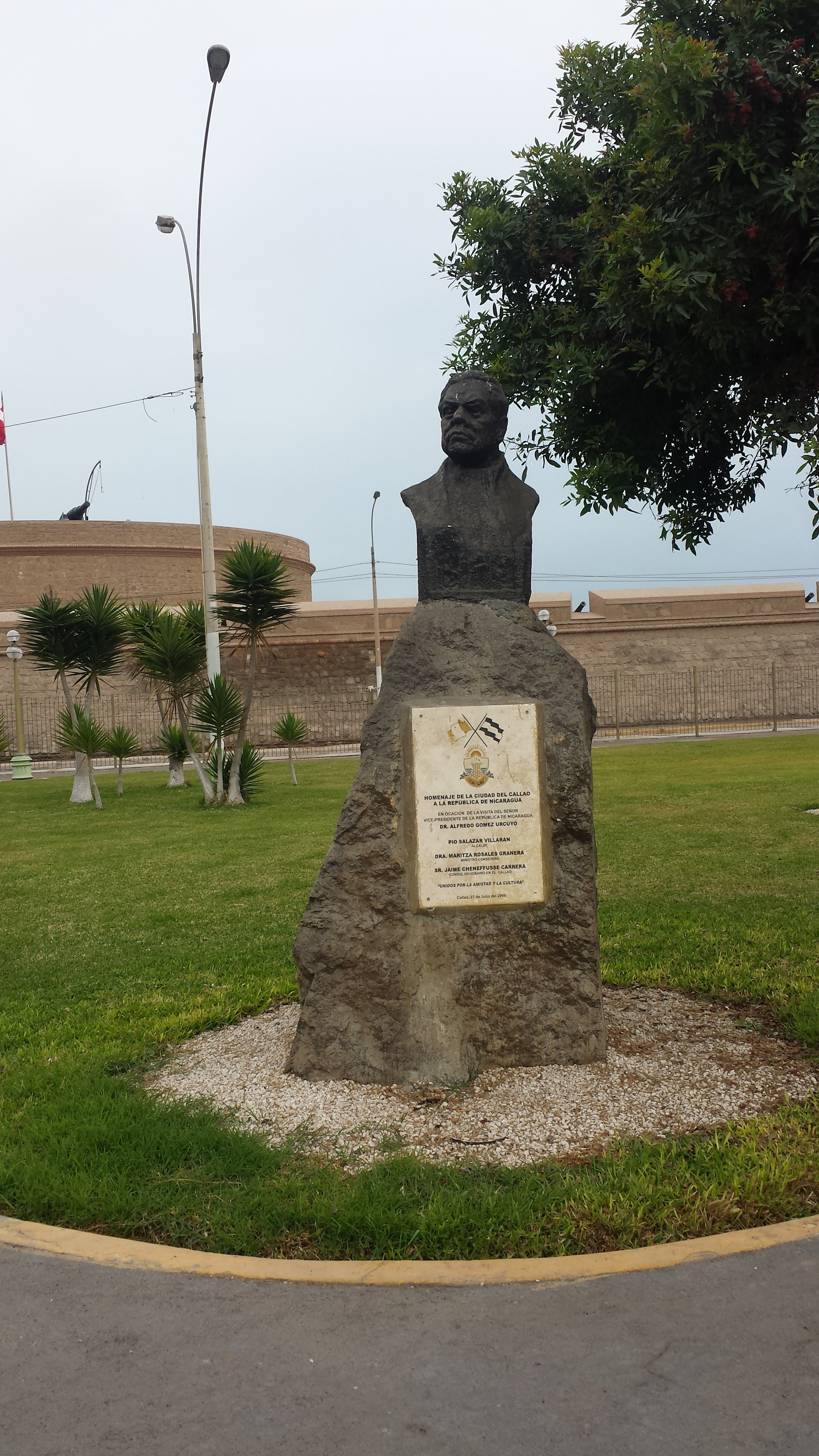
Bust and memorial stone on the occasion of the visit of the Vice President of Nicaragua Alfredo Gómez Urcuyo to Callao, Peru in 2006.

High-level visits from Nicaragua to Peru

- President Daniel Ortega (2007 & 2018)

High-level visits from Peru to Nicaragua

- Foreign Minister Manuel Rodríguez Cuadros (2004)

== Diaspora ==
The Peruvian capital of Lima is home to a community of ≅200 persons, mostly political refugees. One group was invited to the 52nd General Assembly of the Organization of American States, hosted at the Lima Convention Center in October 2022.

== Resident diplomatic missions ==
- Nicaragua has an embassy in Lima.
- Peru has an embassy in Managua.

== See also ==
- Foreign relations of Nicaragua
- Foreign relations of Peru
- List of ambassadors of Nicaragua to Peru
- List of ambassadors of Peru to Central America
- List of ambassadors of Peru to Nicaragua
