= List of ambassadors of El Salvador to Peru =

Ambassador of El Salvador to Peru
- Coat of Arms of El Salvador
- Incumbent; Pablo Caballero Pineda since May 31, 2022

The ambassador of El Salvador to Peru is the foremost representative of the government of El Salvador to the government of Peru.

Both countries established consular relations in 1854 and diplomatic relations followed in 1856. The ambassador's Peruvian counterpart was also accredited to other countries in Central America to the point where the legations in Panama and Central America were merged in 1905, only to be again separated in 1939.

== List of representatives ==
Name	Term begin	Term end	President	Notes
Roberto Quiñones			Óscar Osorio	
Byron Fernando Larios Lopez	1995	2000	Armando Calderón Sol	
Sigifredo Ochoa Pérez	2000	2002	Francisco Flores Pérez	
Raúl Soto-Ramírez	February 2002	2006	Francisco Flores Pérez	
Idalia Gertrudis Menjívar Campos	November 2006	September 2010	Antonio Saca	
Edgar Grego Pineda Rodríguez	February 25, 2015	2019	Salvador Sánchez Cerén	
German Banacek Álvarez Oviedo	March 2020	2022	Nayib Bukele	
Pablo Caballero Pineda	May 31, 2022	Incumbent	Nayib Bukele	

== See also ==
- List of ambassadors of Peru to El Salvador
