= List of ambassadors of Guatemala to Peru =

Ambassador of Guatemala to Peru
- Incumbent; Carlos José Escobedo Menéndez since December 26, 2022
- Inaugural holder: Augusto Morales Dardón
- Formation: May 27, 1955

The Guatemalan ambassador to the Peruvian Government in Lima is the official representative of the Government in Guatemala City to the Government of Peru.

Both countries established relations in 1857, after Peruvian diplomat Pedro Gálvez Egúsquiza was sent in 1856 to Central America on a mission to establish and improve relations with the states of said region. Relations have continued since.

== List of representatives ==
Name	Term begin	Term end	President	Notes
Augusto Morales Dardón	May 27, 1955		Carlos Castillo Armas	First to serve as ambassador to Peru. He delivered his credentials on May 27, 1955.
Juan Francisco Oliva	October 1962		Miguel Ydígoras Fuentes	Colonel Oliva presented his credentials on October 22.
Carlos Eduardo Paniagua España		1967	Enrique Peralta Azurdia	
José María Argueta			Ramiro de León Carpio	Hostage during the Japanese embassy hostage crisis.
Julio Antonio Torres Arriola			Álvaro Arzú	
Olga María Aguja Zúñiga	2004		Óscar Berger	
Gabriel Aguilera Peralta	December 23, 2010	2014	Álvaro Colom	
Walter David Zepeda Chavarría	November 27, 2014	2015	Otto Pérez Molina	
Irma Verónica Araujo Samayoa	January 21, 2016	2022	Jimmy Morales	
Carlos José Escobedo Menéndez	December 26, 2022	Incumbent	Alejandro Giammattei	

== See also ==
- List of ambassadors of Peru to Guatemala
