= List of ambassadors of Peru to Honduras =

Ambassador of Peru to the Republic of Honduras
- Great Seal of Peru
- Ministry of Foreign Affairs
- Appointer: The president of Peru
- Inaugural holder: Pedro Gálvez
- Formation: 1856
- Website: Embassy of Peru in Honduras

The extraordinary and plenipotentiary ambassador of Peru to the Republic of Honduras is the official representative of the Republic of Peru to the Republic of Honduras.

Both countries established relations during the Filibuster War and have maintained them since. Until the 1930s, the representative in Costa Rica was also accredited to other countries in Central America.

== List of representatives ==
Name	Portrait	Term begin	Term end	President	Notes
Pedro Gálvez Egúsquiza		August 5, 1856	1859	Ramón Castilla	Resident minister plenipotentiary of Peru near the States of Central America, New Granada and Venezuela.
Juan Ezeta		1860	1862	Ramón Castilla	Charge d'Affaires and General Consul of Peru near the States of Central America, based in San José.
José A. Figueroa		1862	1863	Ramón Castilla	Secretary in Charge of the Legation of Peru near the States of Central America, with headquarters in San José.
Tomás Lama		1865	1866	Juan Antonio Pezet	Charge d'Affaires and Consul General of Peru close to the Governments of Central America, based in San José.
Tomás Lama		1879	1881	Mariano Ignacio Prado	Resident Minister of Peru in the Republics of Central America.
Ramón Ribeyro		1901	1902	Eduardo López de Romaña	Extraordinary Envoy and Minister Plenipotentiary of Peru in the Republics of Central America, with headquarters in San José (1901) and Guatemala (1902).
José Santos Chocano		1902	1904	Eduardo López de Romaña	Consul general
Federico Alfonso Pezet		1904	1905	Manuel Candamo	Charge d'Affaires and General Consul of Peru in the Republics of Central America, based in Guatemala (1904) and San José (1905).
Federico Alfonso Pezet		1906	1911	José Pardo y Barreda	Charge d'Affaires of Peru in Central America and Panama, based in Panama.
Carlos Ferreyros		1911	1912	Augusto B. Leguía	In charge of the Legation of Peru in Central America, based in Panama.
Enrique A. Carrillo		1920	1926	Augusto B. Leguía	Charge d'Affaires of Peru in Central America, based in San José.
Carlos E. Salcedo		1926	1928	Augusto B. Leguía	Charge d'Affaires of Peru in Central America, based in Guatemala.
Alberto Franco Guerra		1927	1929	Augusto B. Leguía	Ad-interim Chargé d'Affaires of Peru in Central America, based in San José.
Enrique Castro Oyanguren		1929	1930	Augusto B. Leguía	Extraordinary Envoy and Plenipotentiary Minister of Peru in Central America, based in San José.
Gonzalo Ulloa Somocurcio		1931	1931	Luis Miguel Sánchez Cerro	Ad-interim Charge d'Affaires of Peru in Mexico and Central America.
Eduardo Herrera		1932	1934	Luis Miguel Sánchez Cerro	Charge d'Affaires of Peru in Central America, based in San José.
Salvador M. Cavero		1934	1937	Óscar R. Benavides	Charge d'Affaires of Peru in Central America, based in San José.
Evaristo San Cristóval		1937	1937	Óscar R. Benavides	Charge d'Affaires of Peru in Central America.
Adán Espinosa y Saldaña		1938	1939	Óscar R. Benavides	Envoy Extraordinary and Minister Plenipotentiary of Peru in Costa Rica, El Salvador, Guatemala, Honduras and Nicaragua, based in San José.
Juan Mendoza y Almenara		1939	1943	Óscar R. Benavides	Envoy Extraordinary and Minister Plenipotentiary of Peru in Guatemala, El Salvador and Honduras, based in Guatemala.
Carlos Hermoza Moya		1997	August 5, 1997	Alberto Fujimori	As ambassador.
Víctor Yamamoto Miyakawa		1998	2001	Alberto Fujimori	As ambassador.
Mario Pareja Lecaros		2001	2004	Valentín Paniagua	As ambassador.
Gustavo Otero Zapata		May 3, 2004	2008	Alejandro Toledo	As ambassador.
Alfredo José Castro Pérez-Canetto		2009	2011	Alejandro Toledo	As ambassador.
Helí Peláez Castro		2011	2013	Ollanta Humala	As ambassador.
Guillermo Marcial Gonzales Arica		April 22, 2013	2016	Ollanta Humala	As ambassador.
José Jesús Guillermo Betancourt Rivera		October 1, 2016	2019	Pedro Pablo Kuczynski	As ambassador.
Ana Marina Alvarado De Díaz		March 1, 2020	2021	Martín Vizcarra	As ambassador.
Jorge Alejandro Raffo Carbajal		2021	2026	Pedro Castillo	As ambassador.

== See also ==
- List of ambassadors of Honduras to Peru
- List of ambassadors of Peru to Mexico
- List of ambassadors of Peru to Central America
  - List of ambassadors of Peru to Costa Rica
  - List of ambassadors of Peru to El Salvador
  - List of ambassadors of Peru to Guatemala
  - List of ambassadors of Peru to Nicaragua
  - List of ambassadors of Peru to Panama
