= List of ambassadors of Peru to Costa Rica =

Ambassador of Peru to the Republic of Costa Rica
- Great Seal of Peru
- Incumbent; Vacant since 2021
- Ministry of Foreign Affairs
- Appointer: The president of Peru
- Inaugural holder: Pedro Gálvez
- Formation: 1856
- Website: Embassy of Peru in Costa Rica

The extraordinary and plenipotentiary ambassador of Peru to the Republic of Costa Rica is the official representative of the Republic of Peru to the Republic of Costa Rica.

Both countries established relations during the Filibuster War and have maintained them since. Until the 1930s, the representative in Costa Rica was also accredited to other countries in Central America.

== List of representatives ==
| Name | Portrait | Term begin | Term end | President | Notes |
|---|---|---|---|---|---|
| Pedro Gálvez Egúsquiza | | August 5, 1856 | 1859 | Ramón Castilla | Resident minister plenipotentiary of Peru near the States of Central America, New Granada and Venezuela. |
| Juan Ezeta | | 1860 | 1862 | Ramón Castilla | Chargé d'Affaires and General Consul of Peru near the States of Central America, based in San José. |
| José A. Figueroa | | 1862 | 1863 | Ramón Castilla | Secretary in Charge of the Legation of Peru near the States of Central America, with headquarters in San José. |
| Tomás Lama | | 1865 | 1866 | Juan Antonio Pezet | Chargé d'Affaires and Consul General of Peru close to the Governments of Central America, based in San José. |
| Tomás Lama | | 1879 | 1881 | Mariano Ignacio Prado | Resident Minister of Peru in the Republics of Central America. |
| Ramón Ribeyro | | 1901 | 1902 | Eduardo López de Romaña | Extraordinary Envoy and Minister Plenipotentiary of Peru in the Republics of Central America, with headquarters in San José (1901) and Guatemala (1902). |
| José Santos Chocano | | 1902 | 1904 | Eduardo López de Romaña | Consul general |
| Federico Alfonso Pezet | | 1904 | 1905 | Manuel Candamo | Chargé d'Affaires and General Consul of Peru in the Republics of Central America, based in Guatemala (1904) and San José (1905). |
| Federico Alfonso Pezet | | 1906 | 1911 | José Pardo y Barreda | Chargé d'Affaires of Peru in Central America and Panama, based in Panama. |
| Carlos Ferreyros | | 1911 | 1912 | Augusto B. Leguía | In charge of the Legation of Peru in Central America, based in Panama. |
| Enrique A. Carrillo | | 1920 | 1926 | Augusto B. Leguía | Chargé d'Affaires of Peru in Central America, based in San José. |
| Carlos E. Salcedo | | 1926 | 1928 | Augusto B. Leguía | Chargé d'Affaires of Peru in Central America, based in Guatemala. |
| Alberto Franco Guerra | | 1927 | 1929 | Augusto B. Leguía | Ad-interim Chargé d'Affaires of Peru in Central America, based in San José. |
| Enrique Castro Oyanguren | | 1929 | 1930 | Augusto B. Leguía | Extraordinary Envoy and Plenipotentiary Minister of Peru in Central America, based in San José. |
| Gonzalo Ulloa Somocurcio | | 1931 | 1931 | Luis Miguel Sánchez Cerro | Ad-interim Chargé d'Affaires of Peru in Mexico and Central America. |
| Eduardo Herrera | | 1932 | 1934 | Luis Miguel Sánchez Cerro | Chargé d'Affaires of Peru in Central America, based in San José. |
| Salvador M. Cavero | | 1934 | 1937 | Óscar R. Benavides | Chargé d'Affaires of Peru in Central America, based in San José. |
| Evaristo San Cristóval | | 1937 | 1937 | Óscar R. Benavides | Chargé d'Affaires of Peru in Central America. |
| Adán Espinosa y Saldaña | | 1938 | 1939 | Óscar R. Benavides | Envoy Extraordinary and Minister Plenipotentiary of Peru in Costa Rica, El Salvador, Guatemala, Honduras and Nicaragua, based in San José. |
| Luis Ravines Llosa | | 1957 | ? | Manuel Prado Ugarteche | As ambassador. |
| José Pareja Paz Soldán | | 1967 | 1971 | Fernando Belaúnde | As ambassador. |
| José Alvarado-Sánchez | | before 1972 | after 1975 | Juan Velasco Alvarado | As ambassador. |
| Enrique Rivero Vélez | | 1985 | 1990 | Alan García | As ambassador |
| Alberto Varillas Montenegro | | 1994 | April 3, 2000 | Alberto Fujimori | As ambassador. |
| Fernando Rojas Samanez | | 2000 | March 31, 2004 | Alberto Fujimori | As ambassador. |
| Moisés Tambini del Valle | | April 15, 2009 | July 15, 2011 | Alan García | As ambassador. |
| Luis Wilfredo Sándiga Cabrera | | January 1, 2012 | 2016 | Ollanta Humala | As ambassador. |
| Jaime Manuel Cacho Sousa Velázquez | | July 4, 2016 | 2021 | Ollanta Humala | As ambassador. |

== See also ==
- List of ambassadors of Costa Rica to Peru
- List of ambassadors of Peru to Mexico
- List of ambassadors of Peru to Central America
  - List of ambassadors of Peru to El Salvador
  - List of ambassadors of Peru to Guatemala
  - List of ambassadors of Peru to Honduras
  - List of ambassadors of Peru to Nicaragua
  - List of ambassadors of Peru to Panama
