= Costa Rica–Peru relations =

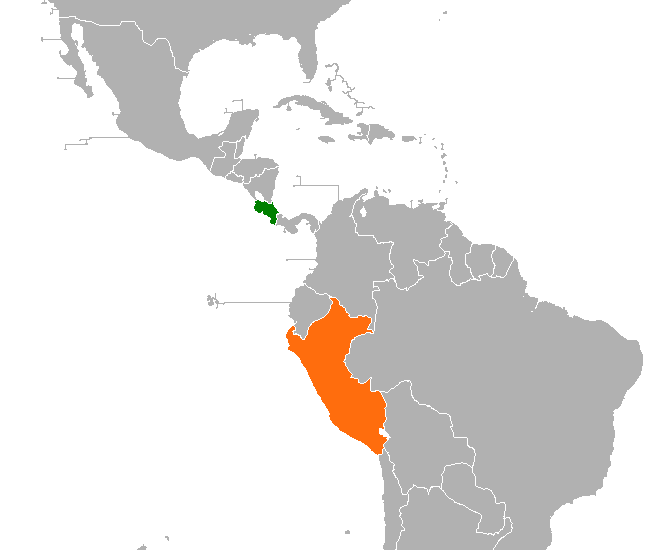

- Costa Rica: Peru

Diplomatic mission
- Embassy of Costa Rica, Lima: Embassy of Peru, San José

Costa Rica–Peru relations (Spanish: Relaciones Costa Rica-Perú) are the bilateral and historical relations between the Republic of Costa Rica and the Republic of Peru. Both countries are members of the Community of Latin American and Caribbean States, the Latin Union, the Association of Academies of the Spanish Language, the Organization of American States, the Organization of Ibero-American States, the Cairns Group.and the United Nations (and its Group of 77)

== History ==
Both countries used to be part of the Spanish Empire. The first diplomatic agent of Costa Rica in Peru was Chargé d'Affaires Gregorio G. Escalante y Nava, who signed the first Peruvian-Costa Rican bilateral agreement with the Chancellor of Peru, José Joaquín de Osma on April 25, 1852. The first diplomatic agent of Peru in Costa Rica was Minister Plenipotentiary Pedro Gálvez, recognised on January 22, 1857.

In economic matters, Costa Rica and Peru have a free trade agreement signed on May 26, 2011; and entered into force on June 1, 2013.

== Resident diplomatic missions ==
- Costa Rica has an embassy in Lima.
- Peru has an embassy in San José.

== See also ==
- Foreign relations of Costa Rica
- Foreign relations of Peru
- List of ambassadors of Costa Rica to Peru
- List of ambassadors of Peru to Costa Rica
