= Guatemala–Peru relations =

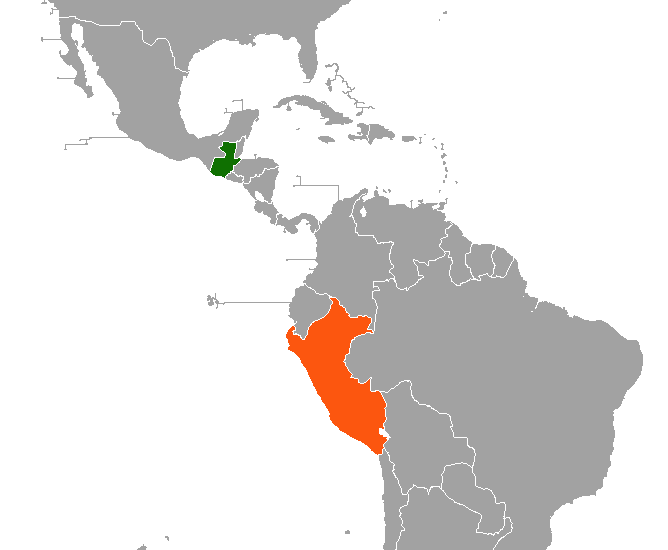
- Guatemala: Peru

Diplomatic mission
- Embassy of Guatemala, Lima: Embassy of Peru, Guatemala

Guatemala–Peru Relations have long-standing bilateral and historical relations. Both countries are members of the United Nations (and its Group of 77), the Community of Latin American and Caribbean States, the Latin Union, the Association of Academies of the Spanish Language, the Organization of American States, the Organization of Ibero-American States, and the Cairns Group.

== History ==
Both states were formerly part of the Spanish Empire and formally established relations in 1857, during the Filibuster War.

Both countries became briefly involved in an international incident when Guatemalan ambassador José María Argueta was among the hostages of the Japanese embassy hostage crisis.

In 2017, heads of state Pedro Pablo Kuczynski and Jimmy Morales met in Paris with Luis Alberto Moreno, president of the Inter-American Development Bank.

In economic matters, Guatemala and Peru have a free trade agreement signed on December 6, 2011.

== Resident diplomatic missions ==
- Guatemala has an embassy in Lima.
- Peru has an embassy in Guatemala City.
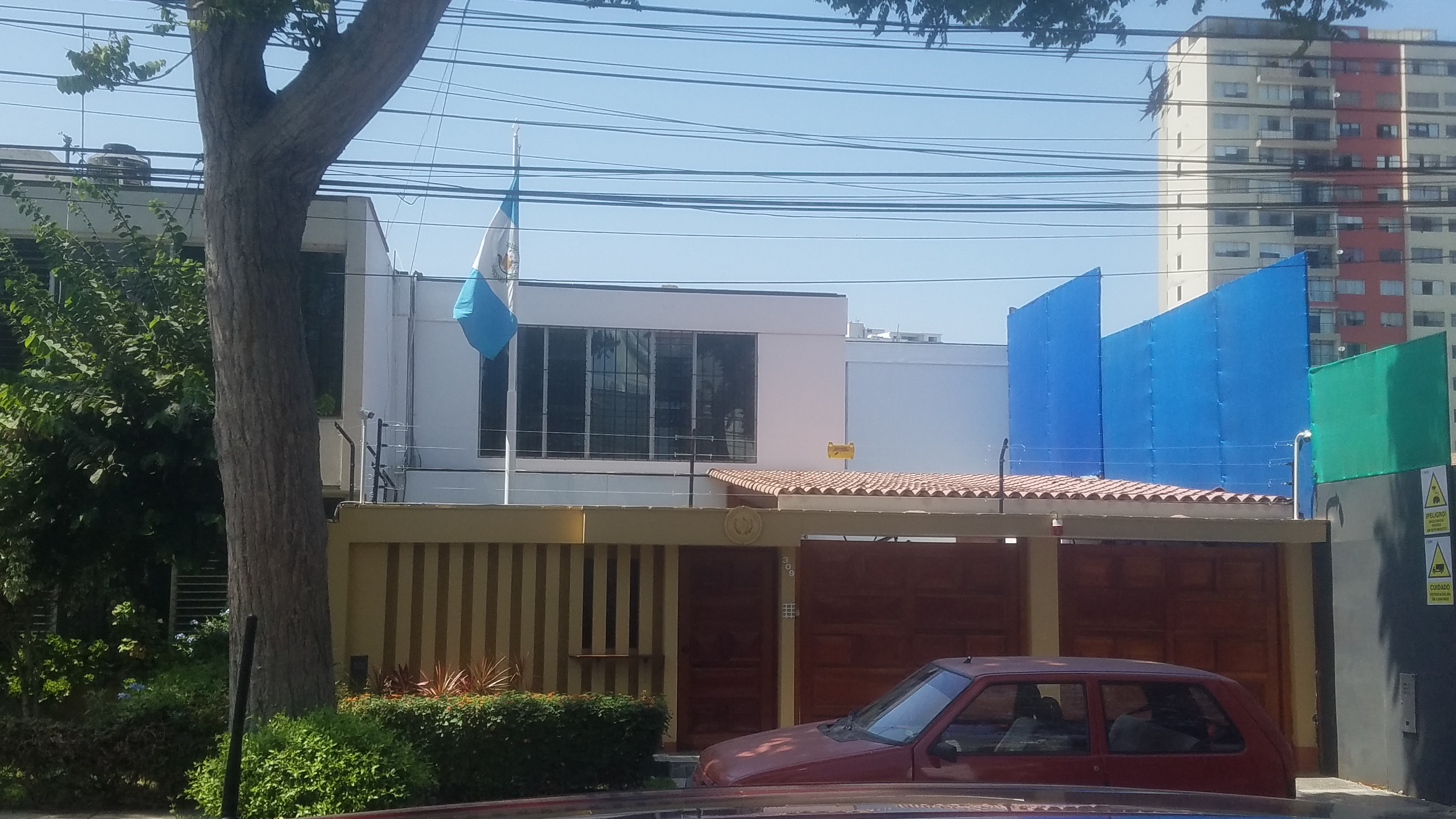
Embassy of Guatemala in Lima

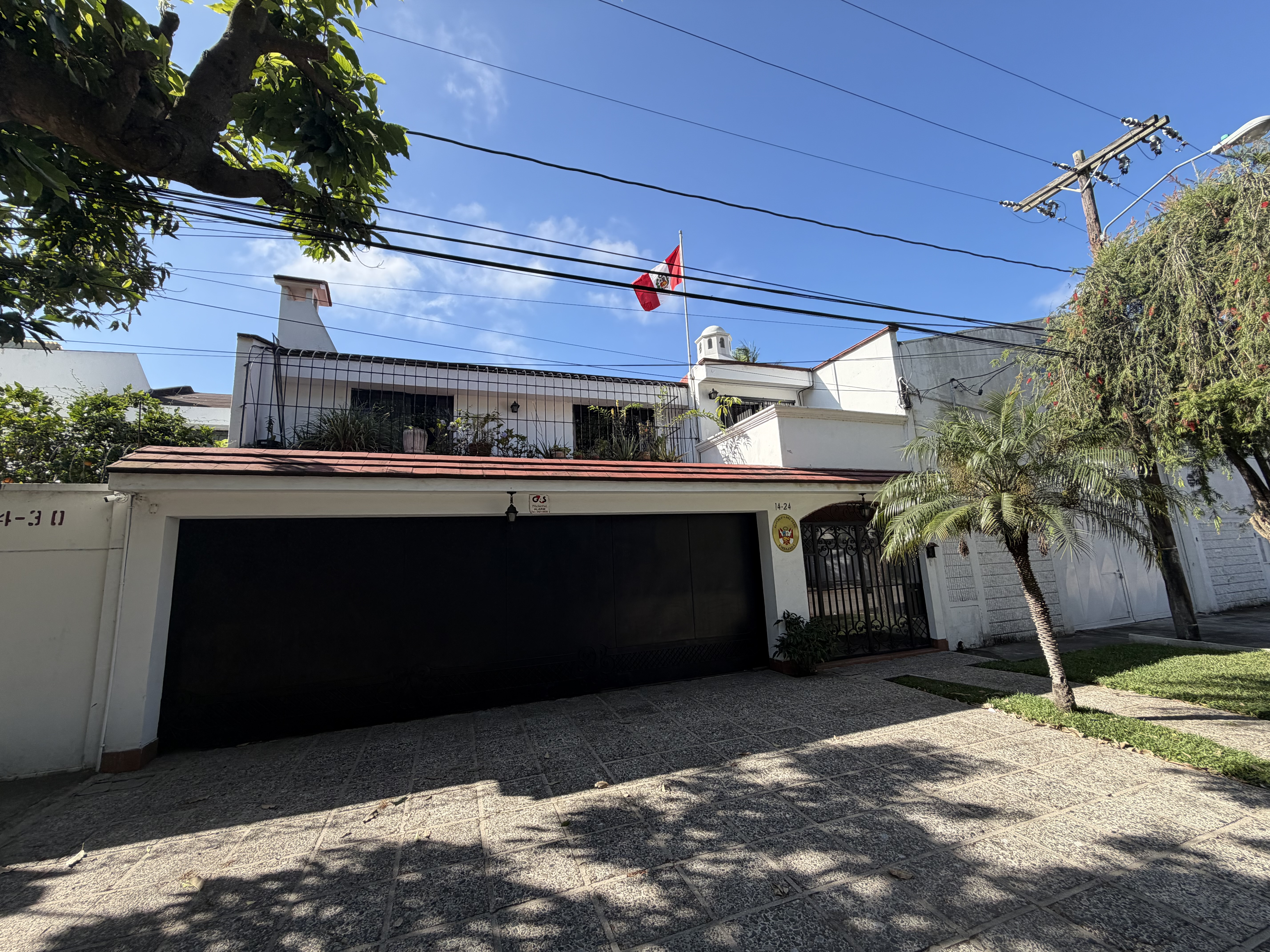
Embassy of Peru in Guatemala City

== See also ==
- Foreign relations of Guatemala
- Foreign relations of Peru
- List of ambassadors of Guatemala to Peru
- List of ambassadors of Peru to Central America
- List of ambassadors of Peru to Guatemala
