= List of ambassadors of Peru to Guatemala =

Ambassador of Peru to the Republic of Guatemala
- Great Seal of Peru
- Incumbent; Vacant since July 12, 2022
- Ministry of Foreign Affairs
- Appointer: The president of Peru
- Formation
- Website: Embassy of Peru in Guatemala

The extraordinary and plenipotentiary ambassador of Peru to the Republic of Guatemala is the official representative of the Republic of Peru to the Republic of Guatemala.

Both countries established relations in 1857, after Peruvian diplomat Pedro Gálvez Egúsquiza was sent in 1856 to Central America on a mission to establish and improve relations with the states of said region. Relations have continued since.

== List of representatives ==
Name	Portrait	Term begin	Term end	President	Notes
Pedro Gálvez Egúsquiza		August 5, 1856	1859	Ramón Castilla	Resident minister plenipotentiary of Peru near the States of Central America, New Granada and Venezuela.
Juan Ezeta		1860	1862	Ramón Castilla	Charge d'Affaires and General Consul of Peru near the States of Central America, based in San José.
José A. Figueroa		1862	1863	Ramón Castilla	Secretary in Charge of the Legation of Peru near the States of Central America, with headquarters in San José.
Tomás Lama		1865	1866	Juan Antonio Pezet	Charge d'Affaires and Consul General of Peru close to the Governments of Central America, based in San José.
Tomás Lama		1879	1881	Mariano Ignacio Prado	Resident Minister of Peru in the Republics of Central America.
Ramón Ribeyro		1901	1902	Eduardo López de Romaña	Extraordinary Envoy and Minister Plenipotentiary of Peru in the Republics of Central America, with headquarters in San José (1901) and Guatemala (1902).
José Santos Chocano		1902	1904	Eduardo López de Romaña	Consul general
Federico Alfonso Pezet		1904	1905	Manuel Candamo	Charge d'Affaires and General Consul of Peru in the Republics of Central America, based in Guatemala (1904) and San José (1905).
Federico Alfonso Pezet		1906	1911	José Pardo y Barreda	Charge d'Affaires of Peru in Central America and Panama, based in Panama.
Carlos Ferreyros		1911	1912	Augusto B. Leguía	In charge of the Legation of Peru in Central America, based in Panama.
Enrique A. Carrillo		1920	1926	Augusto B. Leguía	Charge d'Affaires of Peru in Central America, based in San José.
Carlos E. Salcedo		1926	1928	Augusto B. Leguía	Charge d'Affaires of Peru in Central America, based in Guatemala.
Alberto Franco Guerra		1927	1929	Augusto B. Leguía	Ad-interim Chargé d'Affaires of Peru in Central America, based in San José.
Enrique Castro Oyanguren		1929	1930	Augusto B. Leguía	Extraordinary Envoy and Plenipotentiary Minister of Peru in Central America, based in San José.
Gonzalo Ulloa Somocurcio		1931	1931	Luis Miguel Sánchez Cerro	Ad-interim Charge d'Affaires of Peru in Mexico and Central America.
Eduardo Herrera		1932	1934	Luis Miguel Sánchez Cerro	Charge d'Affaires of Peru in Central America, based in San José.
Salvador M. Cavero		1934	1937	Óscar R. Benavides	Charge d'Affaires of Peru in Central America, based in San José.
Evaristo San Cristóval		1937	1937	Óscar R. Benavides	Charge d'Affaires of Peru in Central America.
Adán Espinosa y Saldaña		1938	1939	Óscar R. Benavides	Envoy Extraordinary and Minister Plenipotentiary of Peru in Costa Rica, El Salvador, Guatemala, Honduras and Nicaragua, based in San José.
Juan Mendoza y Almenara		1939	1943	Óscar R. Benavides	Envoy Extraordinary and Minister Plenipotentiary of Peru in Guatemala, El Salvador and Honduras, based in Guatemala.
Max de la Fuente Locker		1944		Manuel Prado Ugarteche	First secretary
Germán Aramburú Lecaros		1954		Manuel A. Odría	
Alfredo Correa Elias		1955	1957	Manuel A. Odría	Ambassador
César Canevaro y Laos		1959	1961	Manuel Prado Ugarteche	Ambassador
Carlos Ortiz de Zevallos Paz Soldán				Nicolás Lindley López	Ambassador
Roberto Vélez Bravo		1970	1972	Juan Velasco Alvarado	
Santiago Luis Marcenaro Romero		1974	1977	Juan Velasco Alvarado	Ambassador
Percy Murillo Garaycochea		June 11, 1986	1988	Alan García	
Ricardo Temoche Benites		1990	1991	Alberto Fujimori	
María Victoria Castellanos Salazar		1991	1992	Alberto Fujimori	Retired in 1992.
Julio Florián Alegre		1996	2003	Alberto Fujimori	
Alfredo José Castro Pérez-Canetto		November 1, 2005		Alejandro Toledo	
Gliserio David Villanueva Díaz		February 20, 2009		Alan García	
Nilo Jesús Figueroa Cortavarria		October 3, 2011		Ollanta Humala	
Amador Velásquez García-Monterroso		April 1, 2016	June 13, 2020	Ollanta Humala	
Jorge Antonio Méndez Torres Llosa		October 7, 2020	July 12, 2022	Martín Vizcarra	
Ángel Yldefonso		N/A	N/A	Pedro Castillo	Yldefonso was appointed on November 16, 2020, but said appointment was annulled on December 20, 2022.

== See also ==
- List of ambassadors of Guatemala to Peru
- List of ambassadors of Peru to Mexico
- List of ambassadors of Peru to Colombia
- List of ambassadors of Peru to Venezuela
- List of ambassadors of Peru to Central America
  - List of ambassadors of Peru to Costa Rica
  - List of ambassadors of Peru to El Salvador
  - List of ambassadors of Peru to Honduras
  - List of ambassadors of Peru to Nicaragua
  - List of ambassadors of Peru to Panama
