= List of ambassadors of Peru to Nicaragua =

Ambassador of Peru to the Republic of Nicaragua
- Great Seal of Peru
- Ministry of Foreign Affairs
- Appointer: The president of Peru
- Inaugural holder: Pedro Gálvez
- Formation: 1856
- Website: Embassy of Peru in Nicaragua

The extraordinary and plenipotentiary ambassador of Peru to the Republic of Nicaragua is the official representative of the Republic of Peru to the Republic of Nicaragua.

Both countries established relations during the Filibuster War and have maintained them since. Until the 1930s, the representative in Costa Rica was also accredited to other countries in Central America.

== List of representatives ==
Name	Portrait	Term begin	Term end	President	Notes
Pedro Gálvez Egúsquiza		August 5, 1856	1859	Ramón Castilla	Resident minister plenipotentiary of Peru near the States of Central America, New Granada and Venezuela.
Juan Ezeta		1860	1862	Ramón Castilla	Chargé d'Affaires and General Consul of Peru near the States of Central America, based in San José.
José A. Figueroa		1862	1863	Ramón Castilla	Secretary in Charge of the Legation of Peru near the States of Central America, with headquarters in San José.
Tomás Lama		1865	1866	Juan Antonio Pezet	Chargé d'Affaires and Consul General of Peru close to the Governments of Central America, based in San José.
Tomás Lama		1879	1881	Mariano Ignacio Prado	Resident Minister of Peru in the Republics of Central America.
Ramón Ribeyro		1901	1902	Eduardo López de Romaña	Extraordinary Envoy and Minister Plenipotentiary of Peru in the Republics of Central America, with headquarters in San José (1901) and Guatemala (1902).
José Santos Chocano		1902	1904	Eduardo López de Romaña	Consul general
Federico Alfonso Pezet		1904	1905	Manuel Candamo	Chargé d'Affaires and General Consul of Peru in the Republics of Central America, based in Guatemala (1904) and San José (1905).
Federico Alfonso Pezet		1906	1911	José Pardo y Barreda	Chargé d'Affaires of Peru in Central America and Panama, based in Panama.
Carlos Ferreyros		1911	1912	Augusto B. Leguía	In charge of the Legation of Peru in Central America, based in Panama.
Enrique A. Carrillo		1920	1926	Augusto B. Leguía	Chargé d'Affaires of Peru in Central America, based in San José.
Carlos E. Salcedo		1926	1928	Augusto B. Leguía	Chargé d'Affaires of Peru in Central America, based in Guatemala.
Alberto Franco Guerra		1927	1929	Augusto B. Leguía	Ad-interim Chargé d'Affaires of Peru in Central America, based in San José.
Enrique Castro Oyanguren		1929	1930	Augusto B. Leguía	Extraordinary Envoy and Plenipotentiary Minister of Peru in Central America, based in San José.
Gonzalo Ulloa Somocurcio		1931	1931	Luis Miguel Sánchez Cerro	Ad-interim Chargé d'Affaires of Peru in Mexico and Central America.
Eduardo Herrera		1932	1934	Luis Miguel Sánchez Cerro	Chargé d'Affaires of Peru in Central America, based in San José.
Salvador M. Cavero		1934	1937	Óscar R. Benavides	Chargé d'Affaires of Peru in Central America, based in San José.
Evaristo San Cristóval		1937	1937	Óscar R. Benavides	Chargé d'Affaires of Peru in Central America.
Adán Espinosa y Saldaña		1938	1939	Óscar R. Benavides	Envoy Extraordinary and Minister Plenipotentiary of Peru in Costa Rica, El Salvador, Guatemala, Honduras and Nicaragua, based in San José.
Alfredo Arnaiz Ambrossiani		1996	October 16, 2000	Alberto Fujimori	Retired vice admiral of the Peruvian Navy and political ambassador.
Augusto Dammert		July 1983	1985	Fernando Belaúnde	As ambassador.
Eduardo Carlos Bienvenido Carrillo Hernández		April 1, 2002	2006	Alejandro Toledo	As ambassador.
Gerardo Morris Abarca		2007	2009	Alan García	As ambassador.
Carlos Oscar Enrique Bérninzon Devéscovi		June 1, 2009	2012	Alan García	As ambassador.
Rudecindo Vega		January 21, 2012	May 7, 2014	Ollanta Humala	As ambassador.
Alfredo José Castro Pérez-Canetto		October 15, 2014	2020	Ollanta Humala	As ambassador.
Alberto Esteban Massa Murazzi		December 10, 2020; January 1, 2022	December 31, 2021; 2026	Francisco Sagasti	As ambassador.

== See also ==
- List of ambassadors of Nicaragua to Peru
- List of ambassadors of Peru to Mexico
- List of ambassadors of Peru to Central America
  - List of ambassadors of Peru to Costa Rica
  - List of ambassadors of Peru to El Salvador
  - List of ambassadors of Peru to Guatemala
  - List of ambassadors of Peru to Honduras
  - List of ambassadors of Peru to Panama
