= List of ambassadors of Nicaragua to Peru =

Ambassador of Nicaragua to Peru
- Incumbent; Vacant since January 4, 2023

The Nicaraguan ambassador in Lima is the official representative of the Government in Managua to the government of Peru.

Both countries established relations during the Filibuster War and have maintained them since. As of 2023, relations between both countries have soured following the political crisis that followed the 2022 Peruvian self-coup attempt.

== List of representatives ==
Name	Term begin	Term end	President	Notes
Adrián Cuadra Gutiérrez	1959	1975	Luis Somoza Debayle	
Julio Molina Mendoza	1981	1987	Junta of National Reconstruction	
Elba Sandoval Valdivia		2000	Arnoldo Alemán	Started as a chargé d'affaires.
Svetlana Danessa Contreras Obregón	2001	2002	Arnoldo Alemán	
Leandro Marín Abaunza	2002	2003	Enrique Bolaños Geyer	
Guillermo F. Pérez-Argüello	2003	2004	Enrique Bolaños Geyer	Resident in Brazil. Born in Lima in 1950, Pérez-Argüello was also a member of Peruvian band Los Hang Ten's.
Maritza Rosales Granera	2005	2007	Enrique Bolaños Geyer	As chargé d'affaires.
Tomás Borge	March 21, 2007	April 30, 2012	Daniel Ortega	
Marcela Pérez Silva	June 4, 2012	December 21, 2022	Daniel Ortega	Peruvian-born (September 14, 1960) widow of Borge, appointed upon his death.
Gadiel Francisco Arce Mairena	December 21, 2022	January 4, 2023	Daniel Ortega	Formerly the ambassador to Colombia, Arce was appointed to Chile instead after 21 days.

== See also ==
- List of ambassadors of Peru to Nicaragua
