= Ángel G. Hernández =

Honduran professor, politician, and diplomat

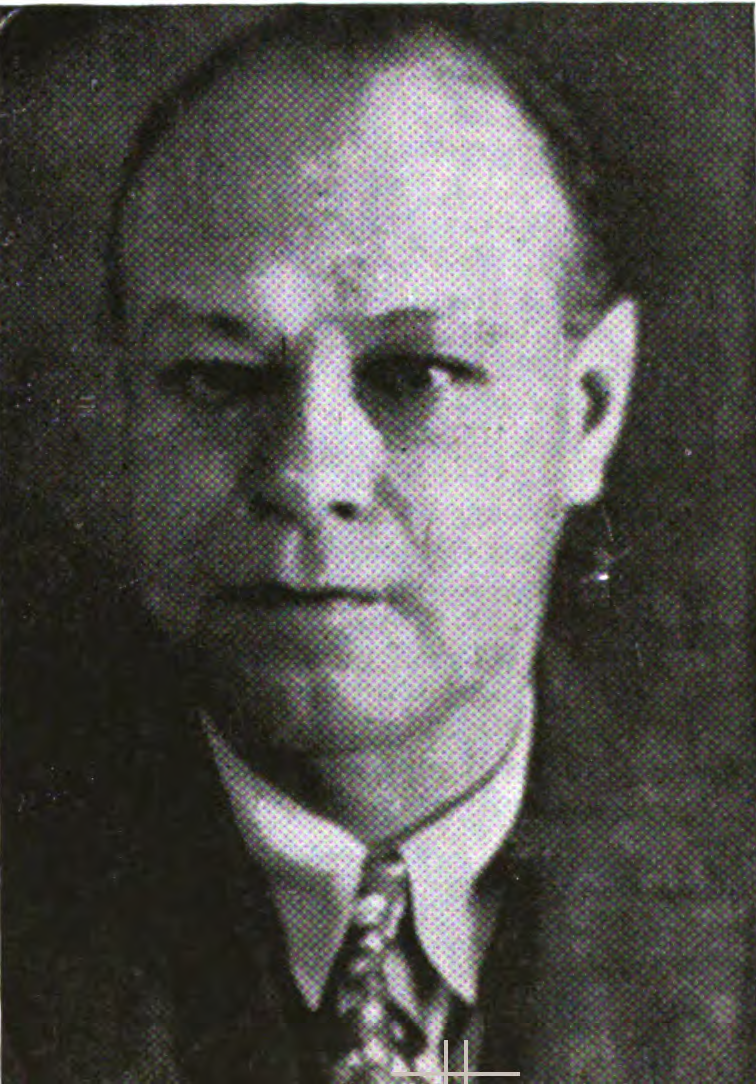

Minister of Public Education
- In office 1943–1949
- President: Tiburcio Carías Andino
- Succeeded by: Marcos Carías Reyes

Personal details
- Born: October 2, 1890
- Died: November 30, 1971 (aged 81)

Ángel G. Hernández (October 2, 1890 – November 30, 1971) was a Honduran professor, politician, and diplomat. He served as Minister of Public Education from 1943 to 1949, and he was also the ambassador to the governments of Panama and Peru, being also appointed as a delegate of the Honduran government in many international conferences.

== Career ==
As a delegate to the "Consolidation of Peace" conference in the city of Buenos Aires, he proposed the paper "Formation of the Citizen of America through Civic Education". In the city of Lima, the "Generalization of the Custom of Baptizing Schools -with the name of American countries- and the disclosure of the agreements approved in International Conferences". This resolution culminated in the Charter of America issued by the Organization of American States. Years later, at the conference in Ann Arbor, Michigan, he mentioned the way in which the "Mutual Knowledge of American Peoples" can be built in schools; at the conference in Panama, he mentioned the issue of Illiteracy; at the Mexico conference, the topic "The Freedom of Teaching", paper that was approved and recommended by the teachers of Cuernavaca to the Secretary of Education of Mexico, Ezequiel Padilla Peñaloza.

In 1946, when he was Minister of Education, he issued the corresponding decree, allocating the budget for the construction of the National Stadium of Honduras.

Government offices
Preceded by -	Minister of Public Education; 1943–1949	Succeeded by Marcos Carías Reyes
