= Three Linguistic Spaces =

Global structure for cooperation

Map of the Three Linguistic Spaces: the Hispanosphere, Lusophone world, and the Francophonie. Countries are colored by their official languages, minority communities are denoted by colored circles. Spanish French Portuguese

The Three Linguistic Spaces (Tres Espacios Lingüísticos in Spanish, Trois Espaces linguistiques in French, Três Espaços Linguísticos in Portuguese, acronym: TEL) is a structure for cooperation between the Francophone, or French-speaking world, the Hispanophone or Spanish-speaking world, and the Lusophone, or Portuguese-speaking world. It is led by the Organization of Ibero-American States, the Community of Portuguese Language Countries and the International Organisation of La Francophonie. The Francophone space is the most populous space with a population of 450 million people and also the largest space at over 20,000,000 km^{2} (7,700,000 sq mi). The Hispanophone space is the richest space by GDP nominal at nearly $5 trillion, slightly ahead of the Francophone space.

== History and Events ==
In 2001, the organizations above held a joint meeting dubbed the First Colloquium of the Three Linguistic Spaces (TEL) (Spanish: I Coloquio de los Tres Espacios Lingüísticos; Portuguese: I Colóquio dos Três Espaços Linguísticos; French: Colloque “Trois espaces linguistiques face aux défis de la mondialisation”). It was conceived, in the words of Spanish academic Frigdiano Álvaro Durántez Prados, as "a process of formalized meetings involving representatives of organizations from countries with Neo-Latin languages, together with independent specialists from those spheres, with the general objective of creating the conditions to initiate a dialogue aimed at achieving a form of Pan-Latin consensus, and 'organizing a common front to combat the negative effects of globalization.'"

In 2013, on the European Day of Languages, the Three Linguistic Spaces organizations issued a message declaring that they "join their voices to underscore the need to protect and promote multilingualism within the European space."

In November 2015, a Meeting of Three Linguistic Spaces was held at the headquarters of the Community of Portuguese Language Countries (CPLP) in Lisbon, with the participation of the Secretary-General of the OEI, as well as representatives from the CPLP, the International Organization of La Francophonie (OIF), and the Ibero-American General Secretariat (SEGIB). The meeting was titled "Language, Identity, and Social Inclusion in a Globalized World," and was divided into three roundtables: Plurilingualism and Intercultural Dialogue; Language, Culture, and Development; and Languages, Knowledge, and Social Inclusion.

== Area, population and GDP by country ==
=== Hispanophone space ===
Spanish-speaking countries:

Rank	Country	Area in km²	Population (2014)	Nominal GDP (2014) in millions USD
1	Argentina	2 780 400	43 024 374	540 200
2	Mexico	1 964 375	120 286 655	1 283 000
3	Peru	1 285 216	30 147 935	202 900
4	Colombia	1 138 914	46 245 297	384 900
5	Bolivia	1 098 581	10 631 486	34 430
6	Venezuela	916 445	28 868 486	205 800
7	Chile	756 102	17 363 894	256 000
8	Spain	505 370	47 737 941	1 407 000
9	Paraguay	406 752	6 703 860	29 700
10	Ecuador	283 561	15 654 411	100 800
11	Uruguay	176 215	3 332 972	55 140
12	Nicaragua	130 370	5 848 641	11 710
13	Honduras	112 090	8 598 561	19 510
14	Cuba	110 860	11 047 251	77 150
15	Guatemala	108 889	14 647 083	60 420
16	Panama	75 420	3 608 431	43 780
17	Costa Rica	51 100	4 755 234	48 140
18	Dominican Republic	48 670	10 349 741	64 080
19	Equatorial Guinea	28 051	722 254	14 310
20	El Salvador	21 041	6 125 512	25 310
21	Puerto Rico	13 790	3 620 897	61 460
	Hispanophone total area	12 012 212	439 320 916	4 925 740

=== Lusophone space ===
Portuguese-speaking countries:

Rank	Country	Area in km²	Population (2014)	GDP nominal (2014) in millions USD
1	Brazil	8 514 877	202 656 788	2 353 000
2	Angola	1 246 700	19 088 106	128 600
3	Mozambique	799 380	24 692 144	16 680
4	Portugal	92 090	10 813 834	230 000
5	Guinea-Bissau	36 125	1 693 398	1 024
6	Timor-Leste	14 874	1 201 542	4 478
7	Cape Verde	4 033	538 535	1 899
8	São Tomé and Príncipe	964	190 428	341
	Lusophone total area	10 709 043	260 874 775	2 736 022

=== Francophone spaces ===
French-speaking countries:

Rank	Country	Area in km²	Population (2014)	GDP nominal (2014) in millions USD
1	Canada	9984670	35099836	1573000
2	Democratic Republic of the Congo	2344858	100375136	39060
3	Chad	1284000	11631456	11690
4	Niger	1267000	18045729	7119
5	Mali	1240192	16955536	10950
6	France	643801	66553766	2423000
7	Central African Republic	622984	5391539	1624
8	Madagascar	587041	23812681	9514
9	Cameroon	475440	23739218	28520
10	Republic of the Congo	342000	4755097	8871
11	Ivory Coast	322463	23295302	31270
12	Gabon	267667	1705336	13800
13	Burkina Faso	274200	18931686	11320
14	Guinea	245857	11780162	6733
15	Senegal	196722	13975834	13990
16	Benin	112622	10448647	7701
17	Togo	56785	7552318	4152
18	Switzerland	41277	8121830	677
19	Belgium	30528	11323973	458700
20	Burkina Faso	27830	10742276	2970
21	Haiti	27750	10110019	8797
22	Rwanda	26338	12661733	8468
23	Djibouti	23200	828324	1743
24	New Caledonia	18575	224824	11100
25	Vanuatu	12189	272264	771
26	French Polynesia	4167	282703	7150
27	Luxembourg	2586	570252	57930
28	Comoros	2235	780971	589
29	Seychelles	455	92430	1375
30	Saint Pierre and Miquelon	242	5657	215.3
31	Wallis and Futuna	142	15613	188
32	Jersey	116	97294	5771
33	French Southern and Antarctic Lands	55	140	0
34	Saint Martin	54	29376	561.5
35	Saint Barthélemy	24	7237	179
36	Monaco	2	30535	6063
	Francophone total space	20 486 067	450 246 730	4 775 562

Total Hispanophone, Francophone and Lusophone spaces:

Rank	Country	Area in km²	Population (2014)	GDP nominal (2014) in millions USD
1	World	148 429 000	7 256 490 011	77 269 168
2	Three Linguistic Spaces	43 207 322	1 150 442 421	12 437 324

By ISO 639-3 code
Enter an ISO code to find the corresponding language article.
