= Carlos Eduardo Paniagua España =

Guatemalan diplomat

Carlos Eduardo Paniagua España (April 26, 1915 – April 19, 1988) was a Guatemalan diplomat. His second wife was Doña Julia Gomez-Mira. His career spanned more than 33 years, serving in Mexico, El Salvador, Panama, Cuba, France, Belgium, Netherlands and Peru. He served as an Ambassador to Peru.

He studied medicine and law. He entered the diplomatic service in 1944 as assistant of Protocol, and served in the Ministry of Foreign Affairs for three years, after which he rose from third secretary to the rank of ambassador. He was once Head of the Mission and Chargé d'Affaires in the Netherlands and was instrumental in the creation of the Organización de Estados Centroamericanos in 1951. He published several novels and accounts that in Mexico and Paris, of note are "Del Alcázar a la Torre Tagle" and "Instructivo Practico (Guía para Diplomáticos".
