= List of ambassadors of Peru to El Salvador =

Ambassador of Peru to the Republic of El Salvador
- Great Seal of Peru
- Ministry of Foreign Affairs
- Appointer: The president of Peru
- Inaugural holder: Pedro Gálvez
- Formation: 1856
- Website: Embassy of Peru in El Salvador

The extraordinary and plenipotentiary ambassador of Peru to the Republic of El Salvador is the official representative of the Republic of Peru to the Republic of El Salvador.

The ambassador in San Salvador is also accredited to Belize.

Both countries established consular relations in 1854 and diplomatic relations followed in 1856. The ambassador to El Salvador was also accredited to other countries in Central America to the point where the legations in Panama and Central America were merged in 1905, only to be again separated in 1939.

== List of representatives ==
Name	Portrait	Term begin	Term end	President	Notes
Pedro Gálvez Egúsquiza		August 5, 1856	1859	Ramón Castilla	Resident minister plenipotentiary of Peru near the States of Central America, (Note: Meaning: Central America; Costa Rica; El Salvador; Guatemala; Honduras; Nicaragua) New Granada and Venezuela.
Juan Ezeta		1860	1862	Ramón Castilla	Charge d'Affaires and General Consul of Peru near the States of Central America, based in San José.
José A. Figueroa		1862	1863	Ramón Castilla	Secretary in Charge of the Legation of Peru near the States of Central America, with headquarters in San José.
Tomás Lama		1865	1866	Juan Antonio Pezet	Charge d'Affaires and Consul General of Peru close to the Governments of Central America, based in San José.
Tomás Lama		1879	1881	Mariano Ignacio Prado	Resident Minister of Peru in the Republics of Central America.
Ramón Ribeyro		1901	1902	Eduardo López de Romaña	Extraordinary Envoy and Minister Plenipotentiary of Peru in the Republics of Central America, with headquarters in San José (1901) and Guatemala (1902).
José Santos Chocano		1902	1904	Eduardo López de Romaña	Consul general
Federico Alfonso Pezet		1904	1905	Manuel Candamo	Charge d'Affaires and General Consul of Peru in the Republics of Central America, based in Guatemala (1904) and San José (1905).
Federico Alfonso Pezet		1906	1911	José Pardo y Barreda	Charge d'Affaires of Peru in Central America and Panama, based in Panama.
Carlos Ferreyros		1911	1912	Augusto B. Leguía	In charge of the Legation of Peru in Central America, based in Panama.
Enrique A. Carrillo		1920	1926	Augusto B. Leguía	Charge d'Affaires of Peru in Central America, based in San José.
Carlos E. Salcedo		1926	1928	Augusto B. Leguía	Charge d'Affaires of Peru in Central America, based in Guatemala.
Alberto Franco Guerra		1927	1929	Augusto B. Leguía	Ad-interim Chargé d'Affaires of Peru in Central America, based in San José.
Enrique Castro Oyanguren		1929	1930	Augusto B. Leguía	Extraordinary Envoy and Plenipotentiary Minister of Peru in Central America, based in San José.
Gonzalo Ulloa Somocurcio		1931	1931	Luis Miguel Sánchez Cerro	Ad-interim Charge d'Affaires of Peru in Mexico and Central America.
Eduardo Herrera		1932	1934	Luis Miguel Sánchez Cerro	Charge d'Affaires of Peru in Central America, based in San José.
Salvador M. Cavero		1934	1937	Óscar R. Benavides	Charge d'Affaires of Peru in Central America, based in San José.
Evaristo San Cristóval		1937	1937	Óscar R. Benavides	Charge d'Affaires of Peru in Central America.
Adán Espinosa y Saldaña		1938	1939	Óscar R. Benavides	Envoy Extraordinary and Minister Plenipotentiary of Peru in Costa Rica, El Salvador, Guatemala, Honduras and Nicaragua, based in San José.
Juan Mendoza y Almenara		1939	1943	Óscar R. Benavides	Envoy Extraordinary and Minister Plenipotentiary of Peru in Guatemala, El Salvador and Honduras, based in Guatemala.
Manuel C. Sotil		1939	1939	Óscar R. Benavides	Chargé d'Affaires ad-interim, based in San Salvador.
Julio Balbuena		1940	1942	Manuel Prado Ugarteche	Chargé d'Affaires ad-interim, based in San Salvador.
Julio Noriega Pazos		1943	1943	Manuel Prado Ugarteche	Chargé d'Affaires ad-interim, based in San Salvador.
Adán Espinosa Saldaña		1943	1945	Manuel Prado Ugarteche	Envoy Extraordinary and Minister Plenipotentiary of Peru in El Salvador.
Enrique D. Tovar Ramírez		1945	1946	José Luis Bustamante y Rivero	Envoy Extraordinary and Minister Plenipotentiary of Peru in El Salvador.
José Jacinto Rada Benavides		1947	1948	José Luis Bustamante y Rivero	Envoy Extraordinary and Minister Plenipotentiary of Peru in El Salvador.
José Carlos Mognaschi		1949	1951	Manuel A. Odría	Envoy Extraordinary and Minister Plenipotentiary of Peru in El Salvador.
César Elejalde Chopitea		1951	1952	Manuel A. Odría	Envoy Extraordinary and Minister Plenipotentiary of Peru in El Salvador.
Víctor Proaño Correa		1953	1954	Manuel A. Odría	Envoy Extraordinary and Minister Plenipotentiary of Peru in El Salvador.
Federico Elguera Diez Canseco		1954	1955	Manuel A. Odría	Envoy Extraordinary and Minister Plenipotentiary of Peru in El Salvador.
Carlos Valera González		1955	1956	Manuel A. Odría	Envoy Extraordinary and Minister Plenipotentiary of Peru in El Salvador.
Cayo Ruiz de Castilla R.		1957	1957	Manuel Prado Ugarteche	Chargé d'Affaires (ad-interim) of Peru in El Salvador.
Gonzalo Pizarro Zeballos		1958	1961	Manuel Prado Ugarteche	Ambassador Extraordinary and Plenipotentiary of Peru in El Salvador.
Germán Aramburú Lecaros		1961	1962	Manuel Prado Ugarteche	Ambassador Extraordinary and Plenipotentiary of Peru in El Salvador.
Gonzalo Ulloa Ruiz de Somocurcio		1962	1970	Ricardo Pérez Godoy	Ambassador Extraordinary and Plenipotentiary of Peru in El Salvador.
Adelmo Risi Ferreyros		1971	1983	Juan Velasco Alvarado	Ambassador Extraordinary and Plenipotentiary of Peru in El Salvador.
Federico Ruiz de Castilla J. Rospigliosi		1984	1985	Fernando Belaúnde	Ambassador Extraordinary and Plenipotentiary of Peru in El Salvador.
Alberto Montagne Vidal		1986	1990	Alan García	Ambassador Extraordinary and Plenipotentiary of Peru in El Salvador.
Max de la Fuente Prem		1990	1992	Alberto Fujimori	Ambassador Extraordinary and Plenipotentiary of Peru in El Salvador.
Gustavo Teixeira		1992	1996	Alberto Fujimori	Ambassador Extraordinary and Plenipotentiary of Peru in El Salvador.
Antonio Gruter Vásquez		1996	2001	Alberto Fujimori	Ambassador Extraordinary and Plenipotentiary of Peru in El Salvador.
Sergio Kostritsky Pereira		2002	2006	Alejandro Toledo	Ambassador Extraordinary and Plenipotentiary of Peru in El Salvador.
Luis Juan Chuquihuara Chil		2007	2009	Alan García	Ambassador Extraordinary and Plenipotentiary of Peru in El Salvador.
Antonio Pajares Paredes		2010	2011	Alan García	Ambassador Extraordinary and Plenipotentiary of Peru in El Salvador.
Eric Edgardo Guillermo Anderson Machado		2012	2016	Ollanta Humala	Ambassador Extraordinary and Plenipotentiary of Peru in El Salvador.
Jorge Alejandro Raffo Carbajal		2016	2016	Ollanta Humala	Named as Ambassador Extraordinary and Plenipotentiary of Peru in El Salvador on February 16. His appointment was left without effect for medical reasons on August 5.
Jorge Eduardo Román Morey		2016	2017	Pedro Pablo Kuczynski	Ambassador Extraordinary and Plenipotentiary of Peru in El Salvador.
Librado Augusto Orozco Zapata		August 1, 2018	2022	Martín Vizcarra	As Ambassador Extraordinary and Plenipotentiary of Peru in El Salvador.
María de Fátima Trigoso Sakuma		2022	2026	Pedro Castillo	As Ambassador Extraordinary and Plenipotentiary of Peru in El Salvador.

== See also ==
- List of ambassadors of El Salvador to Peru
- List of ambassadors of Peru to Mexico
- List of ambassadors of Peru to Central America
  - List of ambassadors of Peru to Costa Rica
  - List of ambassadors of Peru to Guatemala
  - List of ambassadors of Peru to Honduras
  - List of ambassadors of Peru to Nicaragua
  - List of ambassadors of Peru to Panama
