= Tomás Borge =

Nicaraguan revolutionary and politician

Tomas Borge
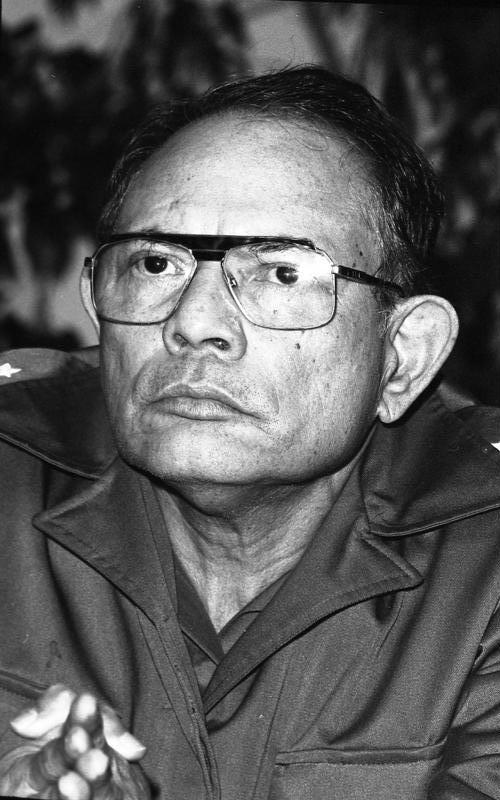

Interior Minister of Nicaragua

Vice-Secretary and President of the FSLN

Personal details
- Born: 13 August 1930 Matagalpa, Nicaragua
- Died: 30 April 2012 (aged 81) Managua, Nicaragua
- Party: Sandinista National Liberation Front

Tomás Borge Martínez (13 August 1930 – 30 April 2012), often spelled as Thomas Borge in American newspapers, was a cofounder of the Sandinista National Liberation Front in Nicaragua and was Interior Minister of Nicaragua during one of the administrations of Daniel Ortega. He was also a renowned statesman, writer, and politician. Tomás Borge also held the titles of "Vice-Secretary and President of the FSLN", member of the Nicaraguan Parliament and National Congress, and Ambassador to Peru. Considered a hardliner, he led the "prolonged people's war" tendency within the FSLN until his death.

In 2010, he stated in an interview: "I am proud to be a Sandinista, to continue being faithful to the red and black flag of our party, to continue being faithful to our revolutionary organization; and to die proud of raising the front, and not having been disloyal to my principles, nor disloyal with my friends nor my companions, nor with my flag, nor with my cries of war."

== Early life ==
Borge was born in Matagalpa on August 13, 1930. His father, Tomás Borge Delgado, was one of Augusto César Sandino's deputy commanders during the United States occupation of Nicaragua, from 1926 to 1932. From a young age, Borge integrated himself in the fight against the Somoza family dictatorship, which had ruled Nicaragua since the assassination of Sandino. In 1943, he began participating in revolutionary activities, and in 1946, he was editing the newspaper "Espartako" against the regime of General Anastasio Somoza García.

== Meeting Fonseca ==
After his secondary education, Borge enrolled as a law student at the National Autonomous University of Nicaragua-León in 1956. The following year he met Carlos Fonseca, with whom Borge would forge a strong friendship. Borge was six years older than Fonseca, which influenced Borge strongly. With Fonseca, Borge read the first few books that would forge their political philosophies: Utopia by Thomas More, novels of John Steinbeck, works by Karl Marx and Friedrich Engels, as well as writings of Lenin.

Along with Fonseca, Borge participated in a group of Marxist Nicaraguan students, who formed the Nicaraguan Socialist Party (PSN), which was based on Marxist thought and pro-Soviet leanings.

He was put under house arrest from 1956 to 1959 during the government crackdown following the assassination of Somoza by poet Rigoberto López Pérez. In 1959, he escaped to Honduras, where he was captured by the Honduran border patrol.

Otto Castro, a friend of both Borge and the president of Honduras at the time, arranged for Borge's release. Borge then travelled using a false passport to El Salvador and Costa Rica, where he would found the Juventud Revolucionaria Nicaragüense (Nicaraguan Revolutionary Youth).

== Foundation of Sandinista National Liberation Front ==
After the victorious Cuban Revolution, Fonseca, Borge, and a few companions decided to use militant tactics to fight against the Somoza regime. They participated in the formation of a militia under the command of Rigoberto López Pérez to face off against the National Guard of Nicaragua. The results were disastrous: Fonseca was gravely injured on July 24, 1959 in an ambush by Honduran and Nicaraguan troops in Honduras. Borge was then in Costa Rica with Silvio Mayorga; they thought Fonseca had perished. Upon reuniting with Fonseca, the three left to Cuba and formed friendships with Che Guevara and Tamara Bunke, who had helped them with the guerilla struggle.

In Cuba, Mayorga reunited with a group of young Nicaraguans from Venezuela, forming what would later be the "Frente Sandinista de Liberación Nacional" (National Sandinista Liberation Front). The name was derived from Augusto Sandino to convince Nicaraguans that Sandino's revolution was not dead and to draw on the fallen leader's enduring popularity. Fonseca traveled to Honduras to prepare the logistics that would permit the establishment of the group. On July 23, 1961, in Tegucigalpa, Borge, along with Carlos Fonseca, Francisco Buitrago, Jorge Navarro, Silvio Mayorga, José Benito Escobar, Noel Guerrero, and Germán Pomares, formed the FSLN, which would be the key to the downfall of the Somoza regime and the start of the Sandinista Revolution.

The FSLN was established in Honduras on the banks of the Patuka River. In 1962, the FSLN had 60 men in its ranks. Borge crossed into Nicaragua to recruit more members to the Sandinista cause.

== Insurrection ==
Between 1965 and 1966, Tomás Borge headed the Sandinista newspaper "The Republican Mobilization." The next year, he tried again to create an active guerrilla group in the mountains near the Pancasán region, but was defeated. In 1969, the National Directorate of the FSLN, of which Borge was a member, named Fonseca as secretary general.

In January 1969, along with Ruiz, Borge was arrested for arms smuggling on the border with Costa Rica. Both were deported to Colombia, beginning a period of exile that took Borge to Cuba and Peru. In that time he also visited the base of the Palestine Liberation Organization in Lebanon, passed by Mexico, and eventually returned to the ranks of the FSLN in Nicaragua.

On February 4, 1976, in the course of being arrested Borge killed the young lieutenant leading the police patrol. He was sent to prison, where he was tortured.

While in prison, the FSLN suffered several defeats and heavy losses. Fonseca perished in Zinica (Waslala, North Caribbean Coast Autonomous Region of Nicaragua). Borge was in prison in Matagalpa; a colonel in the National Guard told him the news of Fonseca's death, to which Borge said

You are mistaken, Colonel, Carlos Fonseca is among the dead who never die.

In August 1978, Borge was one of the highest ranking Sandinistas released from prison after the spectacular Sandinista raid (Operation Chanchera) on the Nicaraguan National Palace by 19 commandos, headed by Edén Pastora (Commander Zero), that took the entire Congress hostage.

The FSLN was divided into three factions at that time; Borge led the Prolonged Popular War fraction (GPP). On January 7, 1979, the FSLN came to an agreement on reunification, which was formalized in March, and Borge became one of the nine members of the National Directorate.

On July 11, as Somoza's grip on power weakened, Borge, along with Daniel Ortega, Sergio Ramirez and Miguel d'Escoto, attended a meeting between the National Directorate and William Boudlerom, representative of the US government, at the home of Costa Rican President Rodrigo Carazo Odio in Puntarenas. At that meeting, Borge rejected the proposal to replace Somoza with Francisco Urcuyo, who would, as President of the Congress, take power in the absence of the president under the Constitution of 1974. Even so Urcuyo was named president when Somoza fled the country on 17 July.

The triumphant guerrilla troops entered Managua on 19 July 1979. Urcuyo was overthrown and power passed to the Joint Government of National Reconstruction.

Borge landing in Cuba off a C-130 Venezuelan Airforce plane on August 25, 1978, after being released as a political prisoner after the Sandinista hostage standoff operative at the National Palace in Managua, 3 days earlier.

=== The revolution ===
After the FSLN proclaimed the Sandinista Revolution Borge, reputed to be the most radical of the nine commanders of the Front, took charge of the Ministry of Interior, overseeing the Sandinista Police, prisons, immigration, Directorate General of State Security and Fire. He maintained this position until the Sandinistas' loss of the presidential election in February 1990.

His first task in office was the dissolution of the National Guard and the reviewing of the cases of former Somoza government officials. Borge, one of a number of Sandinista leaders who had been tortured by the Somoza regime, tried to keep human rights violations low, forbidding cruelty to prisoners and providing prisoners accused of injustices under the Somoza regime with trials. In their first two years in power, Amnesty International and other human rights groups found the human rights situation in Nicaragua greatly improved.

Borge also founded open prisons, providing prisoners with relaxed conditions of custody in return for good behaviour until they could visit home at weekends and guard themselves, and the women's prison "La Esperanza", a novelty in Nicaragua.

Borge created the Council of Sandinista Defense (CDS), modeled on the Cuban's CDR, and the current Council of Citizen Power. The CDS was responsible for gathering and dissemination of information to all Nicaraguans, conducting a block-by-block census of all numbered houses in cities, and distributing rationed goods and funding for community improvement projects. He also attempted to eliminate moderate and minor crimes such as vagrancy, gambling and drinking.

Borge was part of the first revolutionary government delegation which visited the Soviet Union on March 17, 1980. On the trip, he described the situation in his country as follows:

The Government of National Reconstruction was a giant task to restore the devastated country, the need to pay a large external debt left by Somoza and his government held by the international banks. The country has high unemployment and poverty, the treacherous bourgeoisie - an ally of the most reactionary and aggressive circles of US imperialism - show a complete disregard for its people.

On July 19, 1981, in celebration of the third anniversary of the revolution, Borge reiterated that national unity, pluralism and a mixed economy were designed to strengthen, not to destabilize the revolutionary process. It was another warning to the opposition and entrepreneurs. At the same time, he ordered the dismissal of any officers who abused their authority.

In 1982, Tomás Borge was elected vice-president of the Permanent Conference of Political Parties in Latin America, an association of social democratic, socialist, liberal and nationalist parties on the continent.

In 1983, the Reagan administration, which opposed the Sandinista National Liberation Front, denied Borge entry to the United States. Historian Julia Rose Kraut writes that the denial "did not appear to consider the rights of those who had invited Borge to come to the United States and wanted to hear him speak." John Henry Coatsworth, then a history professor at the University of Chicago who had invited Borge to speak on campus, criticized the decision, stating: "The First Amendment means nothing at all if it does not permit American citizens to listen to views their government disapproves of."

=== After defeat ===
After the electoral defeat of 1990, some members of the National Directorate abandoned politics, and the FSLN underwent a transformation into the Sandinista Renovation Movement (MRS). Borge, Bayardo Arce and Daniel Ortega were the only members of the National Directorate who remained in the FSLN.

Between 1997 and 2002, he was a member of the Central American Parliament, Parlacén, and since 2001, a member of Nicaragua's National Assembly.

=== Return to power ===
In the presidential elections held on November 5, 2006, the Sandinista candidate Daniel Ortega won with 38% of the vote. Borge increased his influence in the government. On March 22, 2007, at his request, he was appointed Ambassador of Nicaragua to Peru, where he served until his death. His appointment was seen as a retreat from political life.

=== Death ===
On April 6, 2012, Borge entered the Military Hospital Alejandro Dávila Bolaños in Managua, where he underwent a video-assisted thoracic surgery for a lung condition which had been progressing; according to some unofficial sources, his condition was worse because he traveled to Cuba without being treated first. On April 9, he was transferred to the Intensive Care Unit after a respiratory complication developed while he remained under care. On April 30, Rosario Murillo, coordinator of the Communication and Citizenship Council, announced his death, which had occurred at 20:55 p.m. that night.

Borge had continued serving as ambassador in Lima, Peru almost until his death at 81. He was the last survivor of the founders of the FSLN and one of its most important figures. Rosario Murillo said in reporting his death that Borge, as Borge had said of Carlos Fonseca, is "among the dead who never die."

Official ceremonies were performed in his honor at the National Palace of Culture, the former National Palace, where the chapel once stood. Borge was buried in the mausoleum of Carlos Fonseca, at the Revolution Square in Managua; the government decreed three days of national mourning.

== Criticism ==
Borge was accused of exerting pressure against the Catholic Church hierarchy and accused it of siding with the Contras. Borge also established censorship of the press, which was later relaxed, as well as compulsory military service.

The Misquitos accused Borge, among others, of the displacement and killing of those who opposed the Sandinista government, as told by Marcos Carmona, the President of the Permanent Commission on Human Rights of the Organization of American States (OAS), to the FSLN and opposition in the context of an election campaign. Borge was also accused of ordering the killing of 37 dissidents imprisoned in Granada during the first term of Ortega. He was charged, along with the rest of the Sandinista government, after the victory of Violeta Chamorro in 1990, of the "Piñata sandinista", where they were accused of confiscating public properties. Borge rejected the charges.

In an interview with the newspaper Nuevo Diario of Nicaragua for the 30th anniversary of the Sandinista Revolution, Borge said:

We had come to power covered with an aura of holiness. We were 'the boys', heroes of the people we had released. But then came the war, the pressures, the economic crisis and mistakes, and the heroes we were became kings.

In 2009, Swedish journalist and filmmaker Peter Torbiornsson accused Borge of having ordered the La Penca Bombing of 1984, in which seven people were killed, including three journalists, and a dozen seriously injured. According to Torbiornsson, who survived the bombing, he had been asked by Renán Montero, a Cuban military officer who was working at the time for Borge's Ministry of the Interior, to meet with a man posing as a Danish news photographer and to escort him to the press conference convened by Contra leader Edén Pastora in his outpost at La Penca. That man turned out to be the bomber. Torbiornsson attempted to press charges against Montero, Borge, and former chief of state security Lenín Cerna for murder and crimes against humanity, but the Sandinista government of President Daniel Ortega refused to investigate the matter.

== Private life ==
His first wife, Yelba Mayorga, was killed in 1979 during the guerrilla struggle. The couple had five daughters. Later, he married Josephine Cerda and had several children with her. In 2007, he married the Peruvian actress Marcela Perez Silva and had three children with her.

== Writings ==
Borge was the author of several works of poetry, essays, and an autobiography. The Cuban poet Roberto Fernandez Retamar believes that Borge's book "Carlos, el amanecer no es sólo un sueño", which he wrote in prison, is comparable in literary merit to the documentary prose of Gabriel García Márquez.

Some of his published titles are "The Patient Impatience", "A Grain of Corn", and "The Anticipated Ceremony".

- fidel Castro, tomás Borge. 2009. Un grano de maíz: conversación con Fidel Castro. Editor Aldilá, 243 pp. ISBN 978-99924-0-875-9
- tomás Borge. 1989. La historia de Maizgalpa. Tambor de Tacuarí. Editor Ediciones Colihue 22 pp. ISBN 9505816111 en línea

== See also ==
- FSLN
- Sandinista Revolution
- Augusto Sandino
- Nicaragua
- Contras
- Nicaraguan Revolution
- Fidel Castro
- Che Guevara
- Régis Debray
- Hugo Chávez
