= List of ambassadors of Honduras to Peru =

Ambassador of Honduras to Peru
- Coat of Arms of Honduras
- Incumbent; Marcela María Mejía Díaz; Chargé d'Affaires since February 8, 2023

The Extraordinary and Plenipotentiary Ambassador of Honduras to the Republic of Peru is the official representative of the Republic of Honduras to the Republic of Peru.

Both countries established relations during the Filibuster War and have maintained them since. Both countries became briefly involved in an international incident when Honduran ambassador Eduardo Martell was among the initial hostages of the Japanese embassy hostage crisis.

== List of representatives ==
Name	Term begin	Term end	President	Notes
Hector Callejas Valentine		1961	Ramón Villeda Morales	
Ángel G. Hernández		1969	Oswaldo López Arellano	
Rafael Leiva Vivas		1984	Roberto Suazo Córdova	
Carlos Martinez Castillo		1990	José Azcona del Hoyo	
Napoleón Álvarez Alvarado	1990	1994	Rafael Leonardo Callejas Romero	
José Eduardo Martell Mejía	1994		Carlos Roberto Reina	Martell was one of the hostages during the 1996 Japanese embassy hostage crisis.
Edgardo Paz Barnica		September 26, 2003	Carlos Roberto Reina	Died in office at his home in Tegucigalpa.
Juan José Cueva Membreño	2004	2013	Ricardo Maduro	
Humberto López Villamil	2013		Porfirio Lobo Sosa	Accredited in January 2013, he presented his credentials on March 19.
Jorge Milla Reyes	October 2017	February 2020	Juan Orlando Hernández	Accredited on Oct 2017, he presented his credentials in February 2018
Adán Suazo Morazán	March 2020	2023	Juan Orlando Hernández	
Marcela María Mejía Díaz	February 8, 2023	Incumbent	Xiomara Castro	Chargé d'Affaires.

== See also ==
- List of ambassadors of Peru to Honduras
