= Panama–Peru relations =

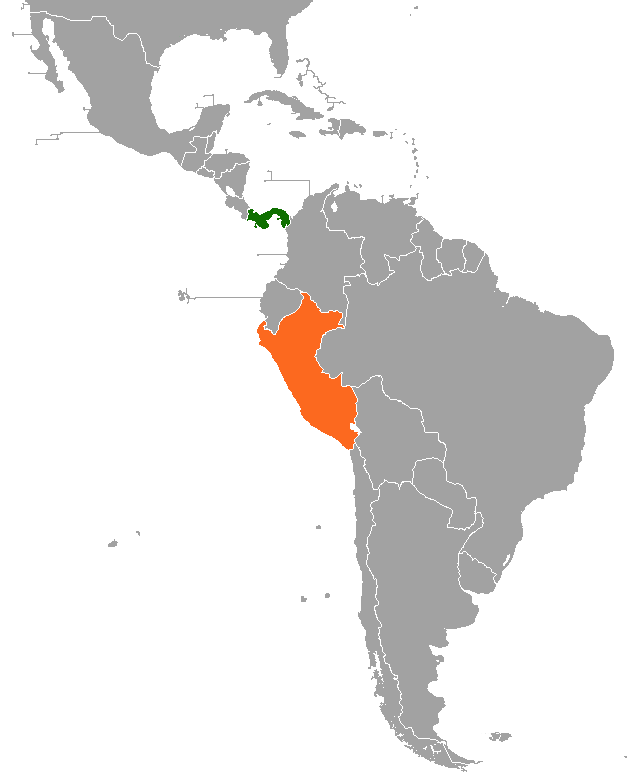
- Panama: Peru

Diplomatic mission
- Embassy of Panama, Lima: Embassy of Peru, Panama

Panama–Peru relations are the bilateral relations between Panama and Peru. Both countries are members of the Organization of American States, the United Nations and the Non-Aligned Movement.

Relations between both countries date back to contacts between the Inca Empire and local Indians in the Isthmus of Panama during pre-Columbian times, with both areas being controlled by the Spanish Empire until the early 19th century. Before and after independence, continued ties between the inhabitants of both regions have solidified the close relationship between both states.

Peru is represented in Panama from its embassy in Panama City, while Panama is represented in Peru through its embassy in Lima.

== History ==
=== Pre-Columbian era and Spanish conquest ===
In pre-Columbian times, the then Inca crown prince Túpac Yupanqui carried out a maritime expedition along the coasts of Tahuantinsuyo, in one of those routes he reached the Gulf of San Miguel, this was the first contact of the Inca Empire with the Indians of pre-Hispanic Panama, although not the first. Túpac returned to his nation with precious stones brought from the coasts of the Panamanian Chocó.

When the Spanish arrived in Panama, the conquistadors found out from the Indians that there was a territory beyond the Gulf of San Miguel with an abundance of gold, this territory was called El Birú, the fantastic place was a distorted version of Tahuantinsuyo. The island of Taboga was used as the starting point for the expeditions to El Birú by Francisco Pizarro and Diego de Almagro in 1526.

=== Spanish era ===
Colonial trade routes in the Isthmus of Panama:: ▬▬▬ Camino Real de Portobelo (from Panama to Portobelo) ▬▬▬ Camino Real de Nombre de Dios (route to Nombre de Dios) ▬▬▬ Camino Real de Cruces (route along the Chagres River) ▬▬▬ Camino Real de Cruces (tour on foot)

Panama was part of the Viceroyalty of New Granada, that did not prevent commercial exchanges between the isthmus and the Viceroyalty of Peru from being intense, within the isthmus was the Cruces road, a road that transported products such as potatoes and quinoa from Callao to Europe. On the other hand, Portobelo was the port on the Atlantic Ocean from where European merchandise was transported to Peru. This exchange was also seen in mutual migration; two of the most important figures of viceregal Catholic Peru, Martín de Porras and Rosa de Lima had family relations with Panama; Martin's mother was originally from this place and Rosa's parents lived in Panama.

The colonial bishop Javier Luna Victoria y Castro, the first Isthmian appointed bishop of the Archdiocese of Panama, who completed the construction of the Cathedral of Panama, also served as bishop of the Archdiocese of Trujillo, north of the Peruvian viceroyalty. The South Sea Navy, a naval corps of the Royal Army of Peru, was in charge of protecting the isthmus in the Pacific against pirate incursions.

From 1550 to 1614 the province of Tierra Firme was under the direct administration of the Viceroyalty of Peru.

=== Republican era ===
On November 28, 1821, during an open town hall meeting in Panama City, the "Independence of Panama" was proclaimed. But the lack of budget, the little military weapons that were available and the insecurity of being reconquered by Spain endangered continuing with the independence adventure of the isthmus, for which reason the union with Peru was proposed, which had been the main trading partner of the Isthmus in colonial times and it was easier and faster to get from Panama to Callao by boat than from Panama to Bogotá. Bishop José Higinio Durán y Martel led this pro-Peruvian party because he considered that Colombia did not have sufficient resources to consolidate independence, however, finally the isthmus joined Colombia. Several soldiers and insurgents from Spanish Panama fought in the Peruvian War of Independence, such as Tomás de Herrera, who stood out in combat in the battle of Ayacucho. Herrera's remains rest on his land and his monument in the Old Town of Panama. At his feet lies land brought from Ayacucho as a tribute. Already in the Republican era, military personnel from Panama fought on the Peruvian side, such as Gregorio Miró Quesada who fought in the Spanish-South American War and in the War of the Pacific.

During the government of Ramón Castilla, the then Republic of Peru reached its maximum level of international influence, to such a level that in the Watermelon riot of 1856, the Peruvian Miguel Abraham defended the fruit vendor Manuel Luna from Jack Oliver, an American attacker.

==== Independence of Panama ====
Map of Colombia from 1886 showing both Panama and the territory disputed by Peru, as part of it.

The Republic of Panama formalized its separation from Colombia on December 3, 1903. Peru was the first country to recognize the new Central American State, likewise the Peruvian government in the 20th century was one of the most benefited from the Panama Canal that had fallen under U.S. control; By 1973, Peru changed its position and became one of the main advocates for the canal to return to the sovereignty of the Panamanian State. Peruvian support allowed the Panamanian cause to reach the Security Council and reached greater intensity in the international community.

In 1989, the Peruvian ambassador to the United States, César Guillermo Atala Nazzal, was removed from office by the Peruvian Government in protest of the United States invasion of Panama.

== In popular culture ==
Panamanian-Peruvian relations had an influence on the Catholic religion, which is the majority in both countries. Due to social and economic exchanges, the devotion of the Lord of Miracles, originating in Viceregal Lima, continues to be present in Panama, having his own festivity in October with purple clothing like his Peruvian counterpart.

Within popular folklore, Peruvian nationalist and irredentist circles in the department of Loreto affirm that the Colombia–Peru War, in which Peru "ceded" territories that were de facto colonized by Peruvians, was a "gift" from the United States to the Colombian State as a consolation prize for the loss of Panama, it is also described that this exchange was to benefit the nationalism of Lima and Bogotá respectively, because the Peruvian capital obtained US support for the reincorporation of Tacna in its conflict with Chile and the Colombian capital had a free hand to recognize Panama as a sovereign state, something the U.S. administration wanted.

== Resident diplomatic missions ==
- Panama has an embassy in Lima.
- Peru has an embassy in Panama City.

== See also ==
- Foreign relations of Panama
- Foreign relations of Peru
- List of ambassadors of Panama to Peru
- List of ambassadors of Peru to Panama
