= List of ambassadors of Panama to Peru =

Ambassador of Panama to Peru
- Incumbent; Jaime G. Serrano since December 11, 2019
- Style: His Excellency

The Panamanian ambassador in Lima is the official representative of the Government in Panama City to the government of Peru.

Both countries established relations on December 18, 1903, after the Separation of Panama from Colombia. Relations have continued since, with both countries having close ties both historically and currently.

The ambassadors of Panama have been involved in a number of political events in Peru, most notably the 1954 extradition of Víctor Raúl Haya de la Torre and the 1996 Japanese embassy hostage crisis.

== List of representatives ==
Name	Term begin	Term end	President	Notes
Enrique Geenzier			Harmodio Arias Madrid	Accredited from Venezuela.
Aníbal Ríos Delgado		1941	Arnulfo Arias	The third in line to the presidency after Arnulfo Arias was overthrown in 1941, he refused the office after being threatened with prison.
Adolfo Arias Espinosa	February 7, 1941	January 1945	Arnulfo Arias	
Raúl De Roux	January 1955		José Antonio Remón Cantera	De Roux was one of the diplomats who accompanied Víctor Raúl Haya de la Torre when he left the Colombian embassy in 1954. He resumed control of the embassy on January 22, 1955. On October 16, chargé d'affaires Samuel Fábrega Goytia arrived in Lima.
Boris Moreno Contreras	March 1973		Demetrio B. Lakas	Moreno inaugurated the Consulate of Panama in Arequipa in 1977. The consulate closed in 1993.
Gerardo Arias	1990	1994	Guillermo Endara	
Carlos Luis Linares Brin	November 25, 1994	2003	Ernesto Pérez Balladares	Linares, the brother of future first lady Marta Linares Brin, was one of the ambassadors during the 1996 Japanese embassy hostage crisis.
Roberto Díaz Herrera	2004	2009	Martín Torrijos	
Carlos Luis Linares Brin	August 7, 2009	2014	Ricardo Martinelli	Second term as ambassador to Peru.
Nicole Danette Wolcovinsky De Ycaza	November 27, 2014		Juan Carlos Varela	
Jaime G. Serrano	December 11, 2019	Incumbent	Laurentino Cortizo	

== See also ==
- List of ambassadors of Peru to Panama
