= Piñata sandinista =

The Piñata sandinista is a case of corruption and appropriation of public and private property by Nicaraguan Sandinista leaders before leaving power in 1990. In the period between the electoral defeat of 25 February 1990 and the inauguration of their adversary Violeta Chamorro on 27 April of the same year, the Sandinistas transferred the ownership of a large amount of real estate and public property, some previously expropriated, to their related organizations and, mostly, personally to their leaders such as President Daniel Ortega himself, his brother Humberto and the leader Tomás Borge. Other assets (such as transportation companies, lumber, sugar factories and slaughterhouses) were nominally taken over by the FSLN but later passed into the private hands of Ortega's relatives and collaborators. The two main laws that implemented the piñata were those known as Law 85 and Law 86.

During the first government of Violeta Chamorro there were thousands of lawsuits against the State by the expropriated former owners. In an appearance in April 2010, the Attorney General of Nicaragua, Hernán Estrada, stated that the Nicaraguan State had paid some 1.3 billion dollars in compensation for the "piñata". Within Sandinismo, divisions were also created between those who benefited and those who did not, between the clientelist sector of the former and those who denounced the practice for ethical and principled reasons.

== See also ==
- Corruption in Nicaragua
