= Corruption in Nicaragua =

Corruption in Nicaragua is a serious problem at all levels of government. Transparency International's 2025 Corruption Perceptions Index gave Nicaragua a score of 14 on a scale from 0 ("highly corrupt") to 100 ("very clean"). When ranked by score, Nicaragua ranked 175th among the 182 countries in the Index, where the country ranked first is perceived to have the most honest public sector. For comparison with regional scores, the best score among the countries of the Americas (Note: Argentina, Bahamas, Barbados, Belize, Bolivia, Brazil, Canada, Chile, Colombia, Costa Rica, Cuba, Dominica, Dominican Republic, Ecuador, El Salvador, Grenada, Guatemala, Guyana, Haiti, Honduras, Jamaica, Mexico, Nicaragua, Panama, Paraguay, Peru, Saint Lucia, Saint Vincent and the Grenadines, Suriname, Trinidad and Tobago, United States of America, Uruguay, Venezuela) was 75, the average score was 42 and the worst score was 10.

According to Freedom House, since Daniel Ortega's election in 2006, corruption has increased in Nicaragua. Nicaragua is ranked 133 of 140 countries in the World Justice Project's Rule of Law Index (2022).

== The Somoza Dynasty ==
=== The beginning of corruption. ===
Throughout its history, Nicaragua has been a country marked by an increasing number of corruption cases. The Somoza dynasty—which established itself through dishonest means—governed the country from 1936 to 1979.They imposed a system that deliberately favors their family wealth. The regime controlled several important institutions—including the Internal Revenue Service, the postal service, and National Radio—managing them with almost complete impunity. The Somoza family amassed a vast personal fortune, built upon practices such as the diversion of foreign aid and corporate bribery. It is estimated that this fortune may have reached $533 million—equivalent to one-third of Nicaragua's GDP in 1979.

A clear example of this occurred during the earthquake of 1972, when the Somoza family decided to divert international humanitarian aid for their own benefit, leaving thousands of Nicaraguans devastated.

In 1979, two key events occurred that paved the way for increased corruption: the Sandinista Revolution and the subsequent period of liberal governments. Meanwhile, in the aftermath of the Sandinista Revolution, various interest groups began competing for control of government positions with the aim of imposing their economic and political ideas upon Nicaragua.

== History ==
=== Alemán presidency ===
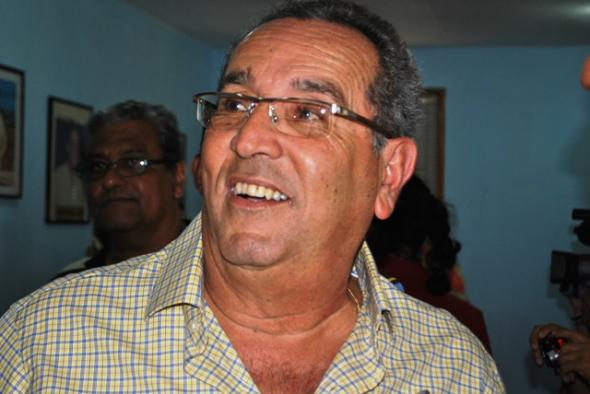
Alemán before 2012

Alemán, constitutionally barred from another term, was succeeded by his vice president, Enrique Bolaños. Allegations emerged that Alemán had concealed massive corruption in his administration. At the end of his presidency, public information about alleged corruption committed under his government became available.

Bolaños accused Alemán of widespread corruption in the Alemán administration. The scheme was reported to have involved several members of Arnoldo Alemán's closest family, including a brother and sister. Ex–ministers and close friends were also charged, some of whom fled the country. However, one of the central figures in the corruption plot, the former chief of the Department of Taxes Byron Jeréz, was imprisoned "on the basis of another charge of corruption. All in all, fourteen persons were charged." Several foreign governments froze Alemán's bank accounts in their countries and threatened to confiscate the funds. In such cases, his defense was to claim that the funds were not stolen, but that they came from his coffee plantations.

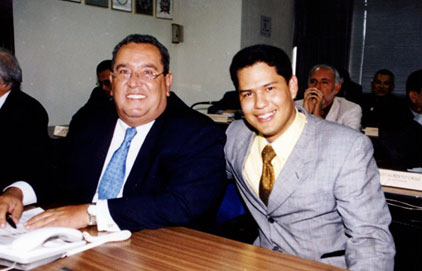
Alemán with Carlos Mayorga in 2009

Alemán was formally charged in December 2002, and on 7 December 2003 he was sentenced to a 20-year prison term for a string of crimes including money laundering, embezzlement and corruption. During his trial, prosecutors produced evidence showing that he and his wife had made extremely large charges to government credit cards, "including a $13,755 bill for the Ritz Carlton hotel in Bali and $68,506 for hotel expenses and handicrafts in India." In addition prosecutors alleged that on top of the $30,878 he spent at the Taj Mahal Hotel in India during a vacation, in Cairo in 1999, he charged $22,530 at a carpet shop, and in August that year, charged $3,867 at the Biltmore Hotel in Coral Gables, Florida, for his engagement party. He also used $25,955 for a honeymoon trip to Italy after his wedding. All of these expenses, along with others, contributed to the growing concerns about the political corruption scandals in Nicaragua, a nation where the average citizen earned about $430 a year. Because of health problems, he had been serving his prison term under house arrest. He was also barred from entering the United States. In 2004, Transparency International named him the ninth most corrupt leader in recent history, estimating that he had looted the country of $100 million in state funds to Panamanian bank accounts controlled by him and his family and then funneled some of the money to his party's candidates affiliates.

Meanwhile, following his presidency, Alemán developed a strategic alliance with Daniel Ortega to rule without effective opposition by offering employment in public offices and other privileges to key members of the Sandinista party, in order to stabilize the country. There are those who claim that the main purpose of this agreement, which led to a constitutional reform, was to distribute the institutions of the state in proportion to the power managed by the two main political parties of the country.

On 16 January 2009, Nicaraguan Supreme Court justices and Chief Justice Manuel Martinez overturned the 20-year corruption sentence against former President Arnoldo Alemán. The decision generated some controversy: "stunned opposition lawmakers immediately suspected a secret deal between Mr. Alemán, ranked one of the world's 10 most corrupt leaders ever by Transparency International, and Daniel Ortega, President of Nicaragua and leader of the Sandinista Party, who wields considerable influence and control over the courts. "He's handing over the National Assembly in exchange for his personal liberty", said Congressman Enrique Saenz. Mr. Alemán, who denies the allegation, said, "Justice has finally been served"."

The following president, Enrique Bolaños, who served under Aleman as his vice president, succeeded him in January, pledging to clean up the corruption in the nation's government, which put him at odds with his predecessor and his administration.

On 9 November 2020, the United States Department of State put Alemán on a list of corrupt foreign officials and also barred his family from entering the country.

== Analysis ==
According to Foreign Policy, following his loss in the 1990 presidential election, Daniel Ortega spent the next decade building alliances with former political enemies, which helped him win the 2006 presidential election. After assuming the presidency, Ortega used various means to maintain his power in Nicaragua. Ortega "used devious legal measures to harass those who refused to align with him", which included former allies and members of the Sandinista front.

Ortega then built an uneasy alliance with the business community, specifically Nicaragua's business organization COSEP, which resulted in less antagonism between his government and private business. This move by Ortega was similar to tactics used by the Somoza family dictatorship which ruled Nicaragua for the decades prior to Ortega's ascent.

According to Freedom House, Nicaragua was among the Largest 10-Year Score Declines list in its Freedom in the World 2017 report, with the human rights organization stating:

The election of Sandinista leader Daniel Ortega in 2006 began a period of democratic deterioration in Nicaragua that continues today. President Ortega has consolidated all branches of government under his party’s control, limited fundamental freedoms, and allowed unchecked corruption to pervade the government. In 2014, the National Assembly approved constitutional amendments that paved the way for Ortega to win a third consecutive term in November 2016.

— Freedom House

=== Bribery ===
Some businesses have suggested that facilitation payments are demanded from the authorities when conducting commercial activities in Nicaragua and the government often shows favoritism towards certain well-connected companies.

=== Electoral fraud ===
Electoral fraud in Nicaragua has paved the way for even greater corruption within the country. Throughout its history, the nation has witnessed presidents who won elections fraudulently—as was the case with Somoza; however, this phenomenon has been particularly pronounced under the government of Daniel Ortega. In the 2021 elections, Ortega secured his fourth consecutive presidential term under highly questionable circumstances. In the period leading up to the presidential vote, the government actively detained nearly 40 opposition figures and, simultaneously, prevented any credible opposition political party from participating in the electoral process. Thus, international groups characterized the electoral actions as unreliable.

In 2021, the National Assembly—controlled by Ortega's Sandinista Front—appointed new magistrates to the Supreme Electoral Council, pursuing its own agenda and thereby stifling the independence of the electoral authority.Following the elections, the Organization of American States declared the results fraudulent. In response, Nicaragua sought to withdraw from the OAS in 2021, and since then, it has refused to allow members of international organizations to assess the country's current situation.

=== Cronyism ===
The New York Times reports that when rising to power, Ortega often used union groups to protest and for other political motives. After taking power, he granted union leaders good positions within the Nicaraguan government.

According to Foreign policy prior to his re-election in the 2016 election, Ortega's wife Rosario Murillo had gained power over much of the Nicaraguan government, controlling all of the social programs of the country. When Murillo became involved in politics, Nicaraguans began to compare President Ortega's family and political practices to that of the Somoza family dictatorship.

By the time of the 2018–2020 Nicaraguan protests, The New York Times stated that Ortega and his wife hold power over the branches of government and media in Nicaragua. With this power, Ortega influenced judges and legislators to get rid of constitutional term limits, allowing Ortega to maintain power. Both opponents and supporters agreed that Ortega's wife, who was named vice president, held power over him. The New York Times asserted, "Few decisions seem to be made without her approval, making it clear that she is calling the shots". Ortega's children have also been rewarded with powerful positions within the government.

== Effects on society ==
Corruption in Nicaragua has had significant consequences for its society, particularly regarding public services and access to them. Between 1998 and 2009, a series of audits and surveys were conducted to examine corruption within five public service sectors: the courts, municipal government, health centers, public primary schools, and the traffic police. The research was based on approximately 6,000 Nicaraguan households and measured citizens' personal experiences with payments made without receipts, unofficial payments, and payments made to facilitate access to services. The results ultimately revealed an uneven pattern of corruption: while some sectors are improving, others are deteriorating, thereby affecting the population.

Based on data collected in the "Barometer of Barometers" survey published in 2023, it is estimated that 22 percent of Nicaraguan citizens have reported being asked for a bribe by a public official. This represents the highest rate ever recorded in Nicaragua.

== Anti-corruption efforts ==
Generally, Nicaragua has a well-developed legislative framework preventing and criminalizing corruption. Nicaragua has also signed several international agreements, such as the Dominican Republic-Central American Free Trade Agreement and the United Nations Convention against Corruption. In practicality, Nicaragua's anti-corruption institutions are highly subject to political influences.

== See also ==
- Piñata sandinista
