= List of ambassadors of Costa Rica to Peru =

Ambassador of Costa Rica to Peru
- Coat of arms of Costa Rica
- Incumbent; Flora Leah Venegas Corrales since 30 January 2024
- Formation: 1852 (174 years ago)
- First holder: Gregorio G. Escalante y Nava

The ambassador of Costa Rica to Peru is the official representative of the government of Costa Rica to the government of Peru.

Both countries established relations during the Filibuster War and have maintained them since.

== List of representatives ==
Representative	Term begin	Term end	President	Notes
Gregorio G. Escalante y Nava	1852		Juan Rafael Mora Porras	First representative of Costa Rica to Peru
Julio Alberto Ortiz López	28 December 1970		José Figueres Ferrer	
Delsa Rangel			Miguel Ángel Rodríguez	
Melvin Sáenz Biolley	3 July 2013	2019	Laura Chinchilla Miranda	
Charles Salvador Hernández Viale			Luis Guillermo Solís Rivera	Chargé d'affaires
Renato Víquez Jiménez	2019	2022	Carlos Alvarado Quesada	
Eduardo Cubero Barrantes	2022	2024	Carlos Alvarado Quesada	Chargé d'affaires
Flora Leah Venegas Corrales	30 January 2024	Incumbent	Rodrigo Chaves Robles	Ambassador.

== See also ==
- List of ambassadors of Peru to Costa Rica
