= List of ambassadors of Peru to Panama =

Ambassador of Peru to the Republic of Panama
- Great Seal of Peru
- Ministry of Foreign Affairs; Marbella 53, Panama City
- Appointer: The president of Peru
- Inaugural holder: Víctor R. Cárdenas
- Formation: September 1904
- Website: Embassy of Peru in Panama

The extraordinary and plenipotentiary ambassador of Peru to the Republic of Panama is the official representative of the Republic of Peru to the Republic of Panama.

Both countries established relations on December 18, 1903, after the Separation of Panama from Colombia. Relations have continued since, with both countries having close ties both historically and currently.

== List of representatives ==
Name	Portrait	Term begin	Term end	President	Notes
Víctor R. Cárdenas		September 1904	1905	Serapio Calderón	As chargé d'affairs. Previously served as Consul to Panama.
Federico Alfonso Pezet Eastted-Alcock		1905	1912	José Pardo y Barreda	Chargé d'affairs in Panama and Central America.
Emilio Rodríguez Larraín		November 1912	November 1913	Guillermo Billinghurst	Chargé d'affairs and general consul
Óscar Barrenechea Raygada		1916	1921	José Pardo y Barreda	Chargé d'affairs and general consul
Guillermo Espantoso Bergmann		1921	1924	Augusto B. Leguía	Chargé d'affairs and general consul
Guillermo Rosenthal Cáceres		1924	1930	Augusto B. Leguía	Chargé d'affairs
Eduardo Garland		1930	1932	Augusto B. Leguía	Chargé d'affairs
Enrique García-Bedoya Corrales-Melgar		1932	1937	Luis Miguel Sánchez Cerro	Chargé d'affairs
Luis Cúneo Harrison		1937	1939	Óscar R. Benavides	Minister plenipotentiary
Emilio Ortiz de Zevallos		1939	1944	Manuel Prado Ugarteche	Minister plenipotentiary
César Canevaro y Laos		1944	1945	Manuel Prado Ugarteche	Chargé d'affairs and minister counselor
Emilio Ortiz de Zevallos		1945	1952	Manuel A. Odría	Ambassador
Germán Aramburú Lecaros		1952	1958	José Luis Bustamante y Rivero	Ambassador
José Francisco Mariátegui Parodi		1958	1961	Manuel Prado Ugarteche	Ambassador
Ignacio Brandariz López Mujica		1961	1962	Manuel Prado Ugarteche	Ambassador
Víctor Pezet Miró Quesada		1962	1964	Ricardo Pérez Godoy	Ambassador
Gonzalo Fernández Puyó		1964	1967	Fernando Belaúnde	Ambassador
César Augusto de la Fuente Álvarez		1967	1968	Fernando Belaúnde	Ambassador
Bruno Guillermo Gerbending Melgar		1968	1971	Juan Velasco Alvarado	Ambassador
Alfonso Ruiz-Huidobro Araoz		1971	1971	Juan Velasco Alvarado	Ambassador
Félix Álvarez Brun		1971	1974	Juan Velasco Alvarado	Ambassador
José Carlos Ferreyros Balta		1974	1977	Juan Velasco Alvarado	Ambassador
Luis Solari Tudela		1977	1982	Francisco Morales Bermúdez	Ambassador
Augusto Salamanca Regalado		1982	1985	Fernando Belaúnde	Ambassador
Javier Ortiz de Zevallos		1985	1988	Alan García	Ambassador
Mario Castro Arenas		1988	1991	Alan García	Ambassador
Guillermo Fernández-Cornejo Cortés		1991	1994	Alberto Fujimori	Ambassador
Alfredo Ross Antezana		1994	2000	Alberto Fujimori	Ambassador
José Antonio Bellina Acevedo		2001	2005	Valentín Paniagua	Ambassador
José Barba		2005	2009	Alan García	Ambassador
Gabriel Ignacio García Pike		2009	2011	Alan García	Ambassador
Guillermo José Russo Checa		2011	2015	Ollanta Humala	Ambassador
Marco Balarezo Lizarzaburu		2015	2017	Pedro Pablo Kuczynski	Ambassador
Mario López Chávarri		2017	2019	Pedro Pablo Kuczynski	Ambassador
Jorge Raffo Carbajal		2019	September 1, 2021	Martín Vizcarra	Ambassador
Richard Rojas		N/A	N/A	Pedro Castillo	Rojas' naming was rejected.
Mario López Chávarri		March 16, 2022	December 7, 2022	Pedro Castillo	Ambassador

== See also ==
- List of ambassadors of Panama to Peru
- List of ambassadors of Peru to Central America
  - List of ambassadors of Peru to Costa Rica
  - List of ambassadors of Peru to El Salvador
  - List of ambassadors of Peru to Guatemala
  - List of ambassadors of Peru to Honduras
  - List of ambassadors of Peru to Nicaragua
