= List of ambassadors of Guatemala to Taiwan =

Coordinates: 25.117157°N 121.524085°E

Ambassador of Guatemala to Taiwan
- Incumbent; Willy Alberto Gómez Tirado since June 2019
- Inaugural holder: Rodolfo Espinosa Sanchez
- Formation: October 24, 1960
- Website: Embajada de Guatemala en Taiwán

The Guatemalan ambassador in Taipei is the official representative of the Government in Guatemala City to the Government of Taiwan.

== History ==
- In 1935 diplomatic relations between the governments of Guatemala and the Republic of China were established, when the Consulate General of the Republic of China was installed in Guatemala City.
- In 1954 the rank of the representation rose from Consulate General to Legation.
- In 1960 the rank of the representation rose from Legation to Embassy.

== List of representatives ==
Diplomatic accreditation	ambassador	Observations	President of Guatemala	Premier of the Republic of China	Term end
October 24, 1960	Rodolfo Espinosa Sanchez		Miguel Ydígoras Fuentes	Chen Cheng	August 20, 1961
December 1, 1961	Humberto Vizcaino		Miguel Ydígoras Fuentes	Chen Cheng	
November 17, 1964	Ramiro Gereda Asturias	Coronel, Since August 1, 1971 dean of the diplomatic corps	Alfredo Enrique Peralta Azurdia	Yen Chia-kan	November 6, 1974
November 25, 1974	Agustín Donis-Kestler		Kjell Eugenio Laugerud García	Chiang Ching-kuo	December 1976
December 1976	Luis A. Henry Sánchez	Encargado de negocios	Kjell Eugenio Laugerud García	Chiang Ching-kuo	March 6, 1977
April 1, 1977	Edgar Arturo López Calvo	(* 1938) He was employed in Spain, Japan and Mexico. In 1977 he was Consul General in Hamburg.	Kjell Eugenio Laugerud García	Chiang Ching-kuo	February 26, 1984
October 26, 1984	Rolando Chinchilla Aguilar		Óscar Humberto Mejía Victores	Yu Kuo-hwa	March 6, 1988
March 26, 1990	de:Carlos Humberto Jiménez Licona		Marco Vinicio Cerezo Arévalo	Hau Pei-tsun	
December 6, 1995	de:Roberto Enrique Mata Gálvez		Ramiro de León Carpio	Lien Chan	May 1, 1996
March 18, 1997	Luis Alberto Noriega Morales		Álvaro Arzú Irigoyen	Vincent Siew	
July 15, 2000	Julio Roberto Palomo Silva		Alfonso Antonio Portillo Cabrera	Tang Fei	
2002	Manuel Ernesto Gálvez Coronado		Alfonso Antonio Portillo Cabrera	Yu Shyi-kun	2005
April 12, 2005	Jorge Ricardo Putzeys Urigüen		Óscar Berger Perdomo	Hsieh Chang-ting	
June 6, 2008	Héctor Iván Espinoza Farfán		Álvaro Colom Caballeros	Wu Den-yih	June 19, 2013
July 6, 2012	Arturo Romeo Duarte Ortíz	6 October 2008 ambassador in Moscow Rusia	Otto Pérez Molina	Sean Chen	June 9, 2015
August 17, 2015	Olga María Aguja Zúñiga		Otto Pérez Molina	Mao Chi-kuo	June 2019
June 2019	Willy Alberto Gómez Tirado		Jimmy Morales	Su Tseng-chang	present
