= Organization of Ibero-American States =

International organization of Portuguese-, Spanish- and Catalan-speaking nations

Organization of Ibero-American States for Education, Science and Culture: Organización de Estados Iberoamericanos (Spanish); Organização de Estados Iberoamericanos (Portuguese); Organització d'Estats Iberoamericans (Catalan)
- Logo

- Members states of the OEI
- Headquarters: Madrid, Spain
- Languages: Spanish; Portuguese; Catalan
- Membership: 23 sovereign states

Leaders
  - Secretary General: Mariano Jabonero

Establishment
  - Foundation: 1949
  - Current statutes: 1985

Area
  - Total: 21,462,574 km^{2} (8,286,746 sq mi)

Population
  - 2005 estimate: 712,974,000
  - Density: 61.09/km^{2} (158.2/sq mi)
- GDP (PPP): 2025 estimate
  - Total: $15 trillion
  - Per capita: $23.960
- Website oei.int/

The Organization of Ibero-American States (Spanish: Organización de Estados Iberoamericanos, Portuguese: Organização dos Estados Iberoamericanos, Catalan: Organització d'Estats Iberoamericans; abbreviated as OEI), formally the Organization of Ibero-American States for Education, Science and Culture, is an international organization made up of 23 member states of Iberophone nations in Europe and the Americas, as well as one member in Africa. The OEI's membership is composed of all of the sovereign states of Ibero-America and the Iberian Peninsula, as well as Equatorial Guinea. All members are Portuguese and Spanish speaking nations, in addition to Andorra, which is predominantly Catalan speaking, though the organization does not include all the Iberophone nations of the world.

== History ==
The OEI was founded in 1949 as an international agency, the Office of Latin American Education, as a result of the first Latin American Education Congress in Madrid. In 1954 the second congress was held in Quito, where it was decided that the OEI would become an intergovernmental organization of sovereign states. On March 15, 1957, at the third Education Congress in Santo Domingo, the first statutes of the OEI became effective until 1985.

In 1979, the fourth congress met in Madrid; in 1983 the fifth congress took place in Lima. In May 1985, an extraordinary meeting of the congress was held in Bogotá, where it was decided to change the name of the OEI to its present name (keeping its acronyms and extending its objectives); the Latin American Education Congress became the General Assembly. At the December 1985 directive council meeting in Panama, its members agreed to the present statutes of the OEI, replacing the 1957 text and approving the organization's regulations. Since the 1991 Ibero-American Summit in Guadalajara, the OEI has promoted conferences of ministers of education and the execution of the educative, scientific and cultural programs delegated to it.

== Objectives ==
The purpose of the OEI is to promote intergovernmental cooperation among its member nations, primarily in the fields of education, science, technology and the arts. Its General Secretariat is located in Madrid. Financing of OEI operations and programs is derived from obligatory quotas and voluntary contributions from the governments of member nations and private cultural and educational institutions and foundations.

- To contribute to the fortification of knowledge, mutual understanding, integration, solidarity and peace among the Ibero-American peoples, and to spread education, science, technology and culture
- To encourage the development of education and culture for peace by preparing people to preserve freedom, solidarity and human rights, supporting change which make these possible
- To collaborate in the interchange of economic, political and cultural influences between Europe and Ibero-America
- To collaborate with its members ensure that their education systems are compassionate, democratic (socially fair) and productive, preparing for working life
- To collaborate in the diffusion of a common culture, respecting the uniqueness of its member states, encouraging global advances in science and technology while retaining cultural identity
- To facilitate relationships among science, technology and society in the Ibero-American countries and citizen understanding of their effects
- To promote the equitable distribution of cultural, Technological and scientific concepts
- To promote lateral cooperation among member states and between the states and other regional institutions
- To contribute to the spread of the Spanish and Portuguese languages, encouraging bilingual education while preserving the multicultural identity of the Ibero-American communities with a multilingual culture

== Structure ==
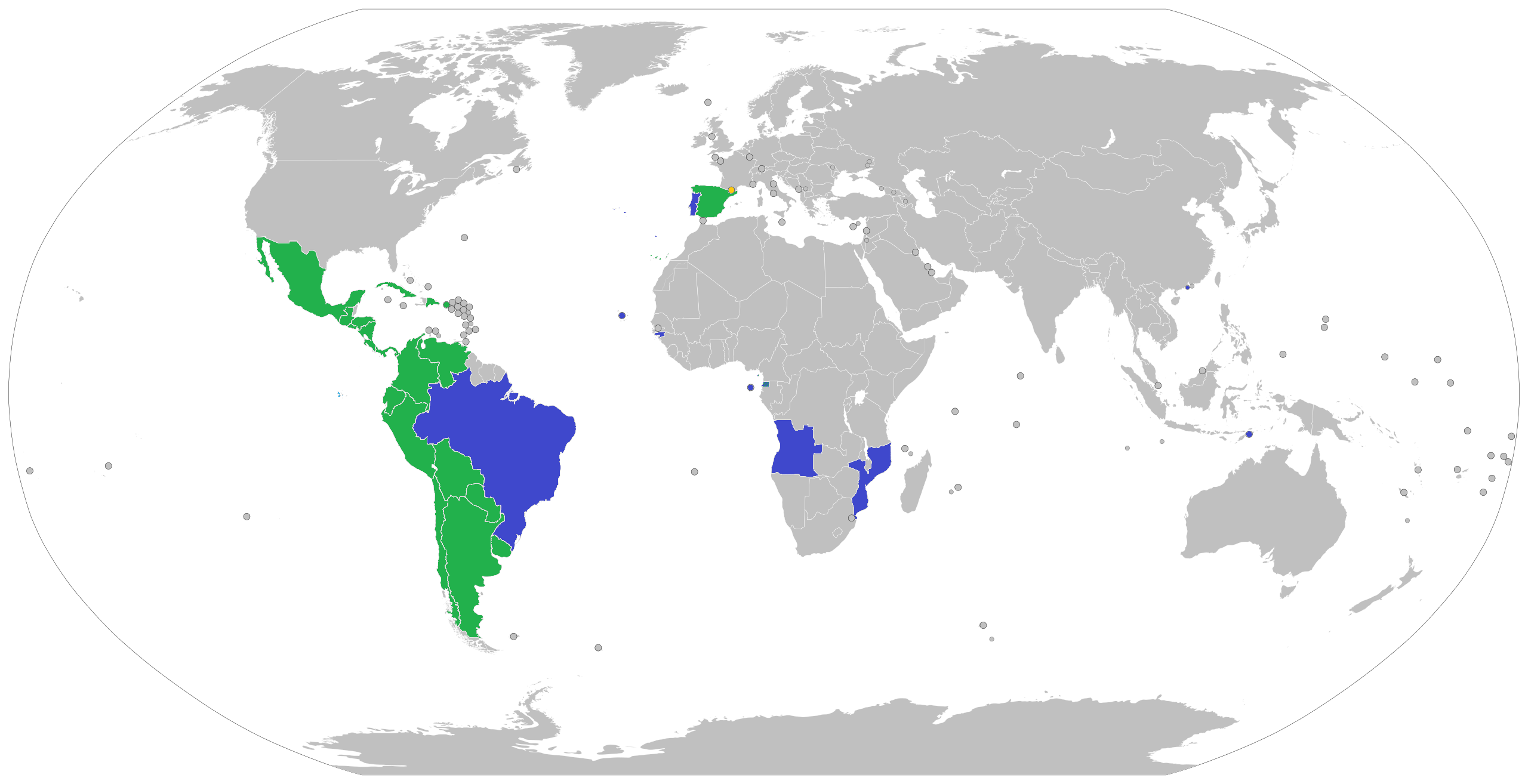
The Iberophone nations of the world: Portuguese-speaking countries. Spanish-speaking countries. Catalan-speaking Andorra.

The OEI consists of three bodies: the General Assembly, the Directive Council and the General Secretariat.

=== General Assembly ===
The General Assembly, the supreme authority of the organization, is composed of representatives (or delegations) from member States. It establishes OEI policies, evaluates and approves the organization's plan of activities, program and global budget, fixes annual dues and chooses the secretary-general.

=== Directive Council ===
The Directive Council is delegated by the General Assembly to control the OEI's government and administration. Made up of the member states' ministers of education (or their representatives), it is governed by the education minister of the country in which the next General Assembly meeting will be held. Its primary function is to analyze and approve the report of activities, programs, the biennial budget and the OEI's financial statement.

=== General Secretariat ===
The General Secretariat is delegated by the General Assembly as executive director of the OEI, representing it to governments, international organizations and other institutions. It directs, administers and executes the organization's programs and projects. The General Secretariat has a flexible internal structure, adaptable according to policies, strategies and the plan of activities.

== Member states ==
Members of the Organization of Ibero-American States

The following 23 states are members of the Organization of Ibero-American States:

- Andorra
- Argentina
- Bolivia
- Brazil
- Chile
- Colombia
- Costa Rica
- Cuba
- Dominican Republic
- Ecuador
- El Salvador
- Equatorial Guinea
- Guatemala
- Honduras
- Mexico
- Nicaragua
- Panama
- Paraguay
- Peru
- Portugal
- Spain
- Uruguay
- Venezuela

== See also ==
- Ibero-American Summit
- Ibero-America
- Organization of American States
- Community of Latin American and Caribbean States
- Community of Portuguese Language Countries
- Three Linguistic Spaces
