= List of ambassadors of Peru to Central America =

The representative of Peru to Central America was the official representative of the Peruvian Republic to Central America, an umbrella term for the countries located in the region of the same name.

== History ==
The term "Central America" was an umbrella term used by the Peruvian Ministry of Foreign Affairs for the countries located in the region between Mexico and Colombia. After the Separation of Panama from Colombia in 1903, Peru established relations with said state on December of the same year, and the legations in Central America and Panama were merged in 1905.

The establishment of relations between Peru and the countries in the region first took place in the 1850s, when Peru sent diplomat Pedro Gálvez Egúsquiza on a mission to establish relations with the countries of the region during the Filibuster War, including neighbouring New Granada and Venezuela. The umbrella representation was phased out in the 1930s, as Peruvian diplomats began to be appointed to the countries themselves instead of the entire region, and the legations of Panama and Central America were separated in 1939.

The countries represented under the name "Central America" were as follows:

- Central America (1896–1898)
- Costa Rica
- El Salvador
- Guatemala
- Honduras
- Nicaragua
- Panama (1905-2026)

As of 2023, Peru is diplomatically represented to each country individually at an embassy level, including, since 1991, an accreditation to Belize from its ambassador in El Salvador.

== List of representatives ==
Name	Portrait	Term begin	Term end	President	Notes
Pedro Gálvez Egúsquiza		August 5, 1856	1859	Ramón Castilla	Resident minister plenipotentiary of Peru near the States of Central America, New Granada and Venezuela.
Juan Ezeta		1860	1862	Ramón Castilla	Chargé d'Affaires and General Consul of Peru near the States of Central America, based in San José.
José A. Figueroa		1862	1863	Ramón Castilla	Secretary in Charge of the Legation of Peru near the States of Central America, with headquarters in San José.
Tomás Lama		1865	1866	Juan Antonio Pezet	Chargé d'Affaires and Consul General of Peru close to the Governments of Central America, based in San José.
Tomás Lama		1879	1881	Mariano Ignacio Prado	Resident Minister of Peru in the Republics of Central America.
Ramón Ribeyro		1901	1902	Eduardo López de Romaña	Extraordinary Envoy and Minister Plenipotentiary of Peru in the Republics of Central America, with headquarters in San José (1901) and Guatemala (1902).
José Santos Chocano		1902	1904	Eduardo López de Romaña	Consul general
Federico Alfonso Pezet		1904	1905	Manuel Candamo	Chargé d'Affaires and General Consul of Peru in the Republics of Central America, based in Guatemala (1904) and San José (1905).
Federico Alfonso Pezet		1906	1911	José Pardo y Barreda	Chargé d'Affaires of Peru in Central America and Panama, based in Panama.
Carlos Ferreyros		1911	1912	Augusto B. Leguía	In charge of the Legation of Peru in Central America, based in Panama.
Enrique A. Carrillo		1920	1926	Augusto B. Leguía	Chargé d'Affaires of Peru in Central America, based in San José.
Carlos E. Salcedo		1926	1928	Augusto B. Leguía	Chargé d'Affaires of Peru in Central America, based in Guatemala.
Alberto Franco Guerra		1927	1929	Augusto B. Leguía	Ad-interim Chargé d'Affaires of Peru in Central America, based in San José.
Enrique Castro Oyanguren		1929	1930	Augusto B. Leguía	Extraordinary Envoy and Plenipotentiary Minister of Peru in Central America, based in San José.
Gonzalo Ulloa Somocurcio		1931	1931	Luis Miguel Sánchez Cerro	Ad-interim Chargé d'Affaires of Peru in Mexico and Central America.
Eduardo Herrera		1932	1934	Luis Miguel Sánchez Cerro	Chargé d'Affaires of Peru in Central America, based in San José.
Salvador M. Cavero		1934	1937	Óscar R. Benavides	Chargé d'Affaires of Peru in Central America, based in San José.
Evaristo San Cristóval		1937	1937	Óscar R. Benavides	Chargé d'Affaires of Peru in Central America.
Adán Espinosa y Saldaña		1938	1939	Óscar R. Benavides	Envoy Extraordinary and Minister Plenipotentiary of Peru in Costa Rica, El Salvador, Guatemala, Honduras and Nicaragua, based in San José.
Juan Mendoza y Almenara		1939	1943	Óscar R. Benavides	Envoy Extraordinary and Minister Plenipotentiary of Peru in Guatemala, El Salvador and Honduras, based in Guatemala.

== See also ==
- List of ambassadors of Peru to Costa Rica
- List of ambassadors of Peru to El Salvador
- List of ambassadors of Peru to Guatemala
- List of ambassadors of Peru to Honduras
- List of ambassadors of Peru to Nicaragua
- List of ambassadors of Peru to Panama
