= José Santos Chocano =

Peruvian writer and diplomat (1875-1934)

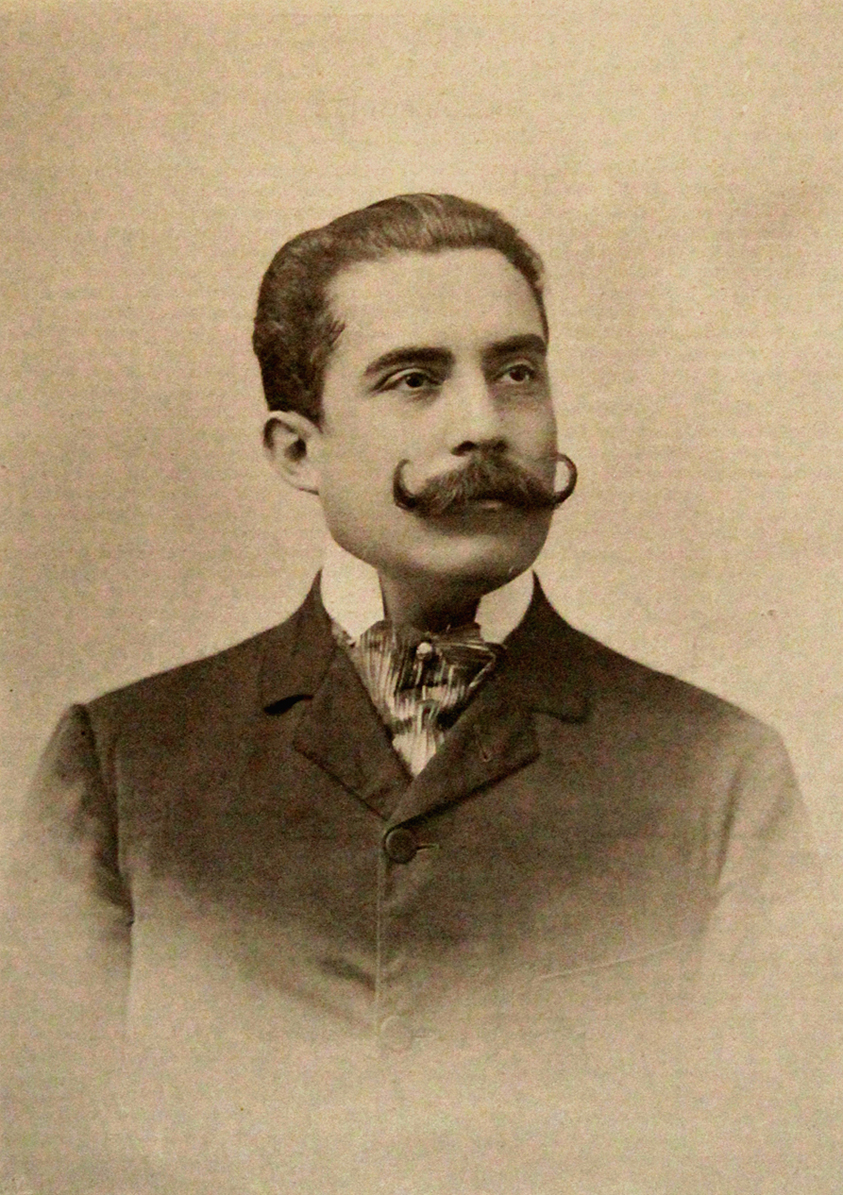
- The Singer of the Americas
- Born: José Santos Chocano Gastañodi; May 14, 1875; Lima, Peru
- Died: December 13, 1934 (aged 59); Santiago, Chile
- Known for: Poet, writer, journalist, diplomat and entrepreneur
- Notable work: Iras Santas, La epopeya del Morro, Cantos del Pacífico, Alma de América, Fiat Lux.
- Awards: Gold medal from El Ateneo De Lima

José Santos Chocano Gastañodi (May 14, 1875 – December 13, 1934), more commonly known by his pseudonym "El Cantor de América" (Spanish pronunciation: [tʃoˈkano]), was a Peruvian poet, writer and diplomat, whose work was widely praised across Europe and Latin America. Considered by many to be one of the most important Spanish-American poets, his poetry of grandiloquent tone was very sonorous and full of color.

He produced lyrical poetry of singular intimacy, refined with formalism, within the molds of modernism. His work is inspired by the themes, the landscapes and the people of Peru and of America in general. He became the most popular writer in Peru after Ricardo Palma, although his ascendancy in Peruvian literary circles gradually diminished, to the benefit of another great peruvian poet, César Vallejo.

He claimed to have rediscovered Latin America through verse in his 1906 collection Alma América, which carried an introduction by the distinguished philosopher-poet Miguel de Unamuno. Chocano was involved in many violent feuds with other intellectuals, and was jailed for shooting a journalist who had criticized him. In his turn, Chocano was stabbed to death on a tram in Santiago by an unknown assailant.

Chocano is remembered by most Peruvians as a great poet; his compositions "Blazon", "The horses of the conquerors" and "Who knows! ..." are classics of recitations to the present.

== Life and work ==
Born in Lima, Peru, Chocano was admitted to the National University of San Marcos at the early age of 14 years. After a short term in jail for political activism, he relocated to Madrid in the early 20th century. In this city his poems were first recognized by the Spanish literary and artistic circles; many notable artists and writers invited him to recite his poems at their reunions. This allowed Chocano to interact with prominent Spanish and Latin American intellectuals and artists such as Juan Gris (aka José González-Pérez), who became known by this pseudonym by signing the illustrations that he created for Chocano's book Alma América and Poemas Indoespañoles (Soul America: Indo-Spanish poems) in 1906; Miguel de Unamuno, who wrote the prologue for Alma América; Marcelino Menéndez y Pelayo; and Rubén Darío; and thus his name reached a prominent status not only in Spain, but in France and all over Latin America. His 1906 poetry collection, Alma América, was offered and taken as a "New World" corrective to the purportedly cosmopolitan modernismo of Rubén Darío. Chocano was a sophisticated writer whose metrics and creativity were sought by many statesmen who contracted his services as a writer and adviser for many years. He worked for different regimes and traveled a decade and a half through Latin and Central America, where he befriended a variety of political figures from different points on the ideological spectrum, such as Pancho Villa in Mexico, Manuel Estrada Cabrera in Guatemala, and Woodrow Wilson in the USA, with whom he struck up a correspondence. After the coup which deposed Estrada Cabrera in 1920, Chocano was briefly imprisoned, and subsequently returned to Peru, where he became associated with President Augusto B. Leguía. On November 5, 1922, Chocano was recognized by the government of Peru as a most notable poet of Peru, he made a laureate as "The Poet of America" in a ceremony featuring Leguía himself, various ministers, delegates from all the provinces of Peru, and a number of young and established writers.

Three years later, Chocano became embroiled in a dispute with Mexican intellectual José Vasconcelos; when Peruvian students sided with Vasconcelos, Chocano phoned the journalist Edwin Elmore to complain about his recent article on the polemic; insults and threats quickly followed. Elmore dashed off an article detailing Chocano's attack on him, and hurried to his office at the newspaper "El Comercio" to insert it. Unfortunately, as Elmore left the building, Chocano arrived at it, and after Elmore slapped Chocano, the latter pulled a gun and shot the young journalist in the stomach. Elmore died soon after.

Released after two years in jail, Chocano moved to Santiago, where he lived in dire poverty while preparing a new collection of poetry, Primicias de Oro de Indias. He was stabbed to death on a streetcar in 1934; reports are divided as to whether his assassin was a stranger, a madman, or a rival in a love affair. It is thought that his murder had to do with his political positions.

== Style ==
Chocano is considered one of the most important leaders of the Latin-American Modernism, sharing this distinction with Ruben Darío (Nicaragua), Manuel González Prada (Peru), José Martí (Cuba), Manuel Gutiérrez Nájera (Mexico), José Asunción Silva (Colombia) and others. However, Chocano's style is difficult to classify exactly, since it is very diverse and copious: for instance, some experts state that his writing is nearer to romanticism that to modernism; while others, like the American critic, Willis Knapp Jones, have denominated Chocano's work as "novomundista", i.e., a poet writing about the "new World" or America. Chocano was a very prolific poet, who also wrote epic and lyric poems.
