= 2020 in Peru =

- Decades: 2000s; 2010s; 2020s
- See also: Other events of 2020; Timeline of Peruvian history

Events in the year 2020 in Peru.

== Incumbents ==
- President:
  - Martín Vizcarra
  - Francisco Sagasti (from 17 November)
- Prime Minister:
  - Vicente Zeballos (until 15 July)
  - Pedro Cateriano (from 15 July)
  - Walter Martos Ruiz (from 6 August)
  - Violeta Bermúdez (from 18 November)

== Events ==
Ongoing – The 2017–2021 Peruvian political crisis

=== January ===
- 26 January – Scheduled date for the 2020 Peruvian parliamentary election.

=== April ===
- 27 April – A prison riot at the Miguel Castro Castro prison in San Juan de Lurigancho, Lima left nine inmates dead.

=== August ===
- 22 August – 13 people are killed in a stampede when police raided at a nightclub in Los Olivos District.

=== September ===
- 18 September – Impeachment hearings for President Martín Vizcarra begin.

== Deaths ==
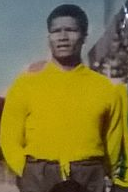
Walter Ormeño

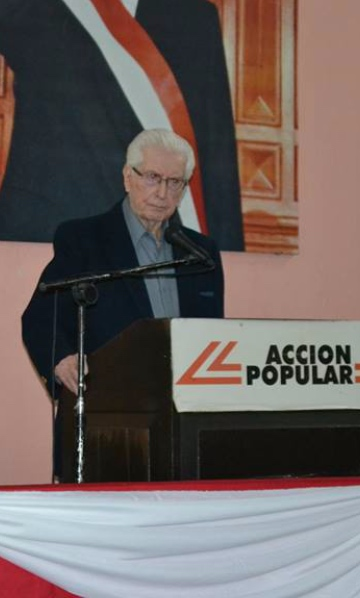
Javier Alva Orlandini

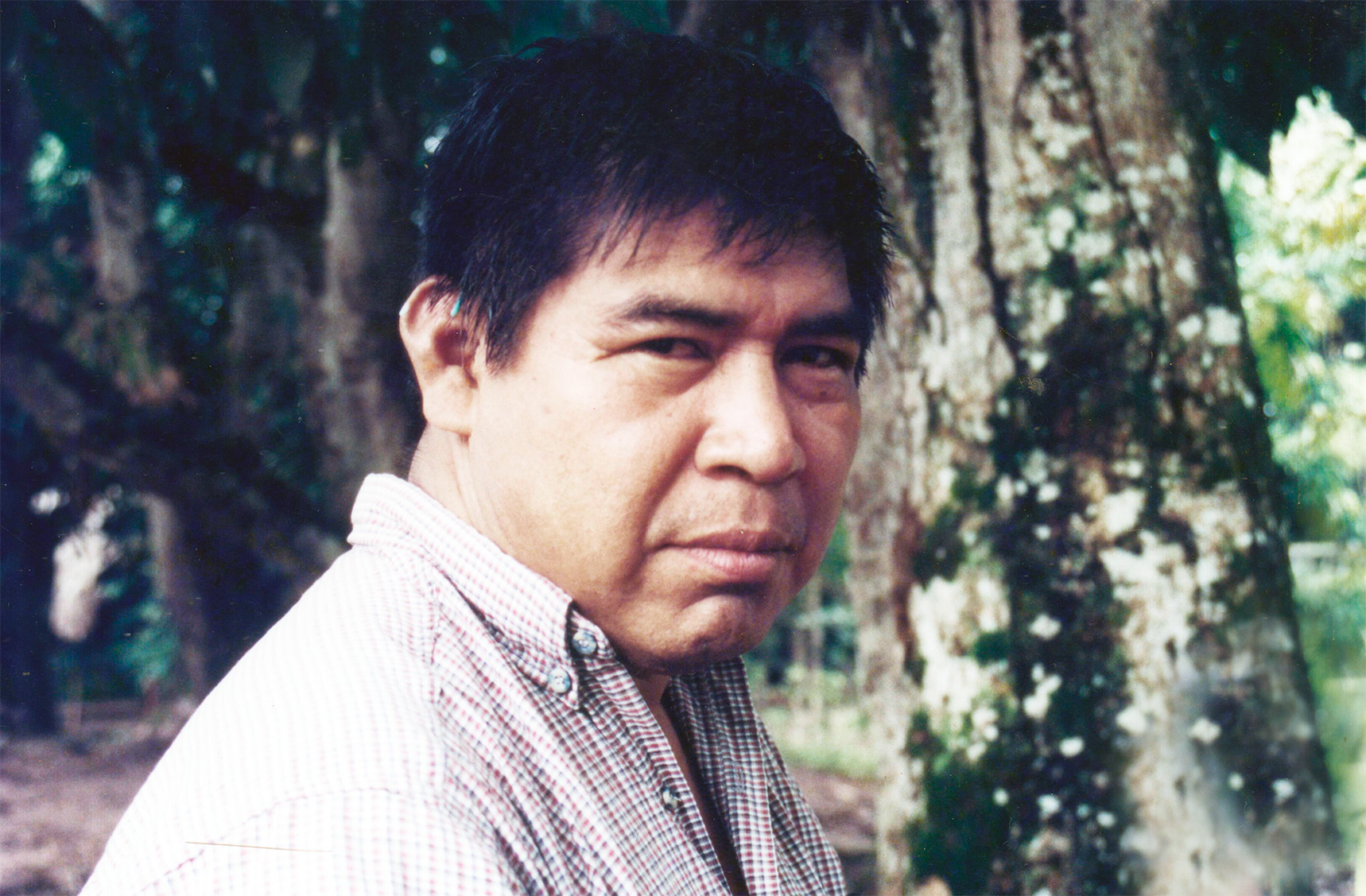
Santiago Manuin Valera

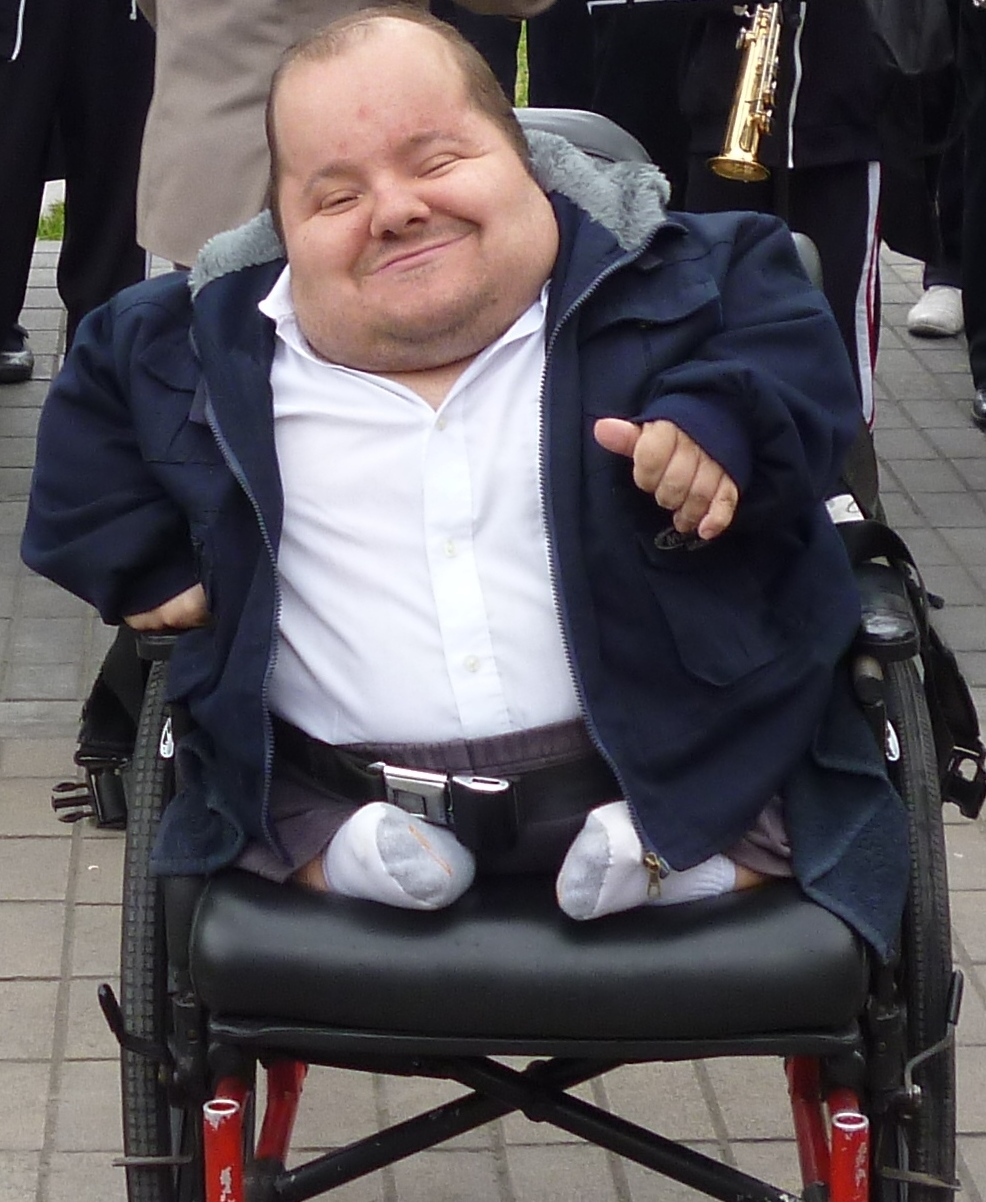
Gian Carlo Vacchelli

=== January ===
- January 4 – Walter Ormeño, footballer (b. 1926).
- January 9 – Pablo Macera, historian (b. 1929).
- January 19 – Dante Frasnelli Tarter, Roman Catholic bishop (b. 1925).

=== March ===
- March 4 – Javier Pérez de Cuéllar, politician and diplomat (b. 1920).

=== June ===
- June 1 – Javier Alva Orlandini, politician, Vice President, President of the Senate (b. 1927).
- June 9 – Luis Repetto Málaga, museologist and cultural manager (b. 1953).

=== July ===
- July 1 – Santiago Manuin Valera, Awajún leader and Indigenous rights activist (b. 1957).

=== August ===
- August 10 – Luis Abilio Sebastiani Aguirre, Roman Catholic prelate, Archbishop of Ayacucho o Huamanga (b. 1935).
- August 12 – Gian Carlo Vacchelli, sports commentator and politician (b. 1981).
- August 14 – Moisés Mamani, politician (b. 1969).
- August 24 – Jorge Sanjinez Lenz, military volunteer (b. 1917).
- August 25 – Francisco Belaúnde, politician (b. 1923).

=== September ===
- September 14 – Alicia Maguiña, singer and composer (b. 1938).

=== December ===
- December 14 – Segundo Galicia Sánchez, professor and sociologist (b. 1938).

== See also ==
- History of Peru
