= 2019 in Peru =

- Decades: 1990s; 2000s; 2010s; 2020s; 2030s
- See also: Other events of 2019; Timeline of Peruvian history

Events in the year 2019 in Peru.

== Incumbents ==
- President: Martín Vizcarra
- Prime Minister:
  - César Villanueva (until 8 March)
  - Salvador del Solar (from 11 March)

== Events ==
- 23 January — Former president Alberto Fujimori (1990-2000) is sent back to complete a 25 year sentence in prison after the Supreme Court of Peru overturns his presidential pardon.
- 27 January — The 2019 Abancay landslide.
- 8 March — Amid growing unpopularity, Prime Minister Cesar Villanueva resigns and is succeeded by Salvador del Solar.
- 10 April — Pedro Pablo Kuczynski, President of Peru from 2016 to 2018, is arrested and held in preventive prison for 10 days by court order for active involvement in the Operation Car Wash and for laundering on behalf of Westfield Capital.
- 17 April — Former president Alan Garcia Perez(1985-1990, 2006-2011) commits suicide before being detained by Peruvian authorities for laundering and corruption.
- 26 May — An 8.0 magnitude earthquake strikes Ucayali and Loreto, killing 2.

== Publications ==
=== Novel ===
- Teresa Ruiz Rosas: Estación delirio

== Deaths ==
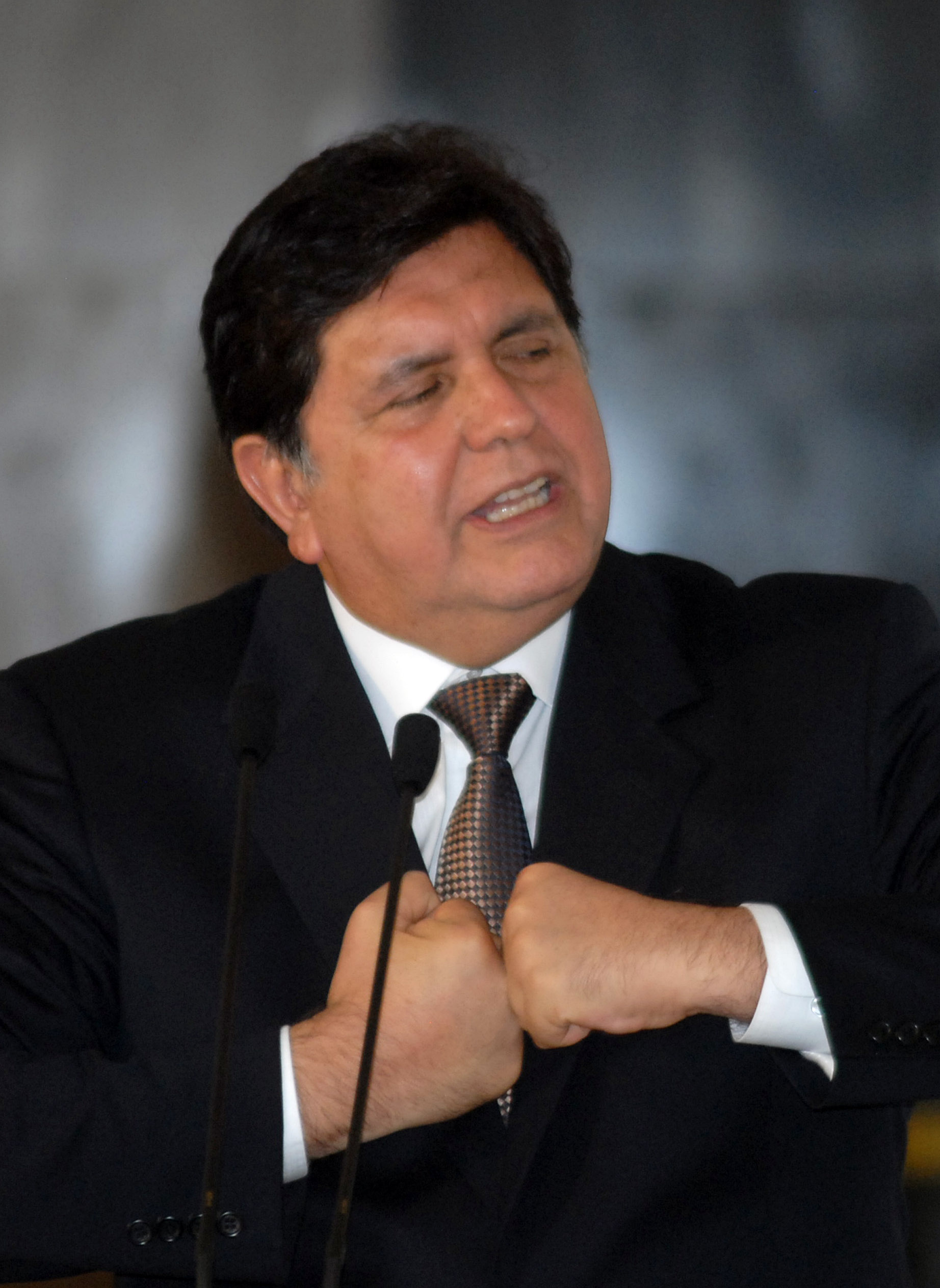
Alan García

=== January - June ===
- 17 January – Tulio Mora, poet.
- 16 February – Juan Incháustegui, engineer and politician, Minister of Energy and Mines and of Industry, Foreign Trade and Tourism (b. 1938).
- 17 February – Carlos Flores, footballer (b. 1974).
- 21 March – Gonzalo Portocarrero, sociologist, social scientist and essayist (b. 1949).
- 17 April – Alan García, politician (b. 1949).
- 11 June – Francisco Miró Quesada Cantuarias, philosopher (b. 1918)
- 24 June – José Huerta, Peruvian politician (b. 1948)

=== July - December ===
- 14 July – Miguel Gutiérrez, writer (b. 1940)
- 27 July – Máximo Mosquera, footballer (b. 1928)
- 11 September – Ricky Tosso, actor (b. 1960; cancer)
- 1 November – Rodolfo Hinostroza, poet (b. 1941)

== See also ==
- 2019 Pan American Games
