= 2017 in Peru =

- Decades: 1990s; 2000s; 2010s; 2020s
- See also: Other events of 2017; Timeline of Peruvian history

Events in the year 2017 in Peru.

== Incumbents ==
- President: Pedro Pablo Kuczynski
- First Vice President: Martín Vizcarra
- Second Vice President: Mercedes Aráoz
- Prime Minister: Fernando Zavala Lombardi (until September 17), Mercedes Aráoz (starting September 17)

== Events ==
- The 2017 Peru flood was a natural disaster in Peru in which more than 100 000 homes were demolished, over 100 bridges washed out, and multiple roadways rendered inoperable. Over 70 people have lost their lives as a result of the flooding.

== Publications ==
- Francisco Sagasti and Lucía Málaga Sabogal's book Un desafío persistente. Políticas de ciencia, tecnología e innovación en el Perú del siglo 21.

== Cinema ==
- La última tarde (The last evening) by Joel Calero.

== Deaths ==
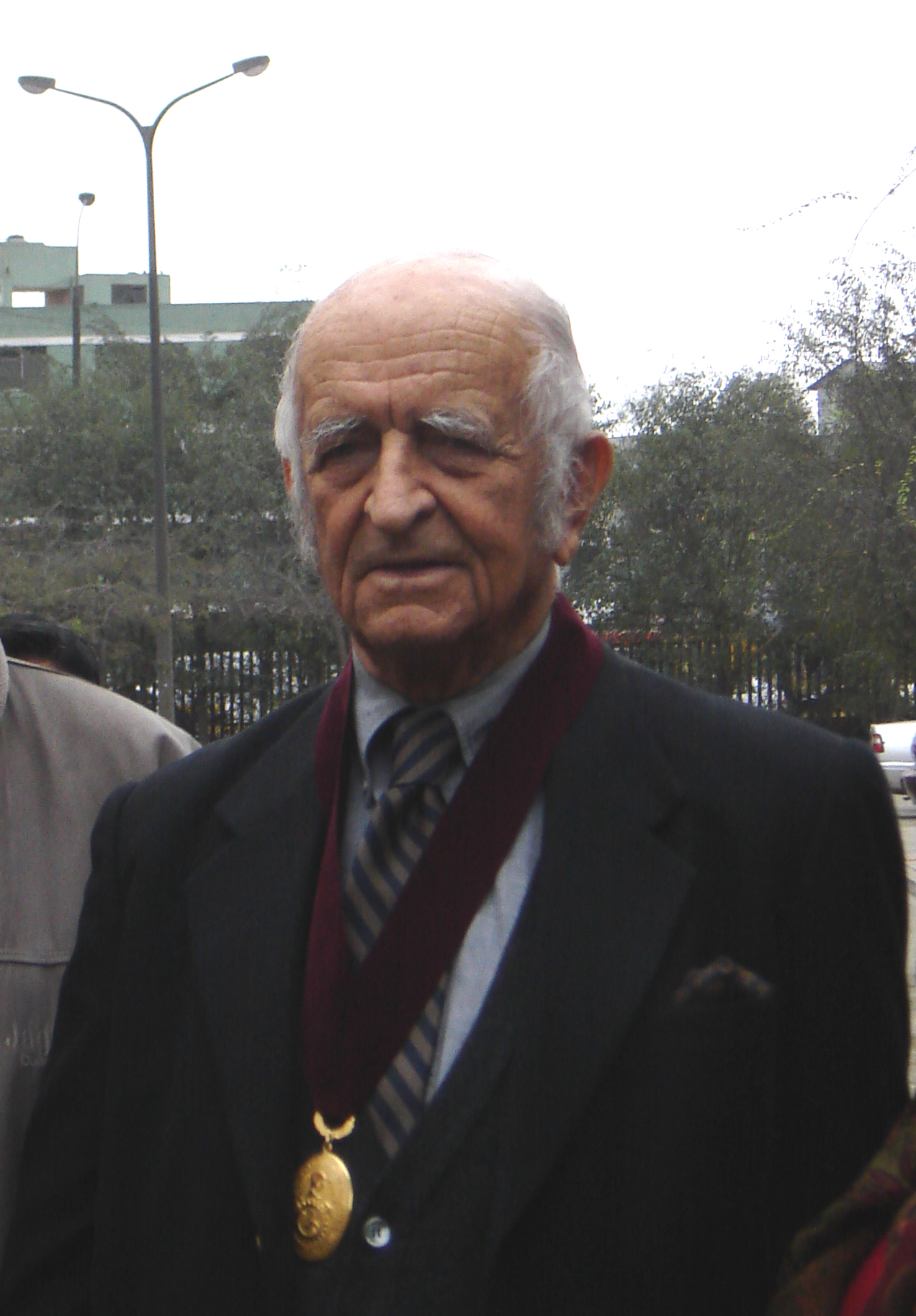
Fernando de Szyszlo

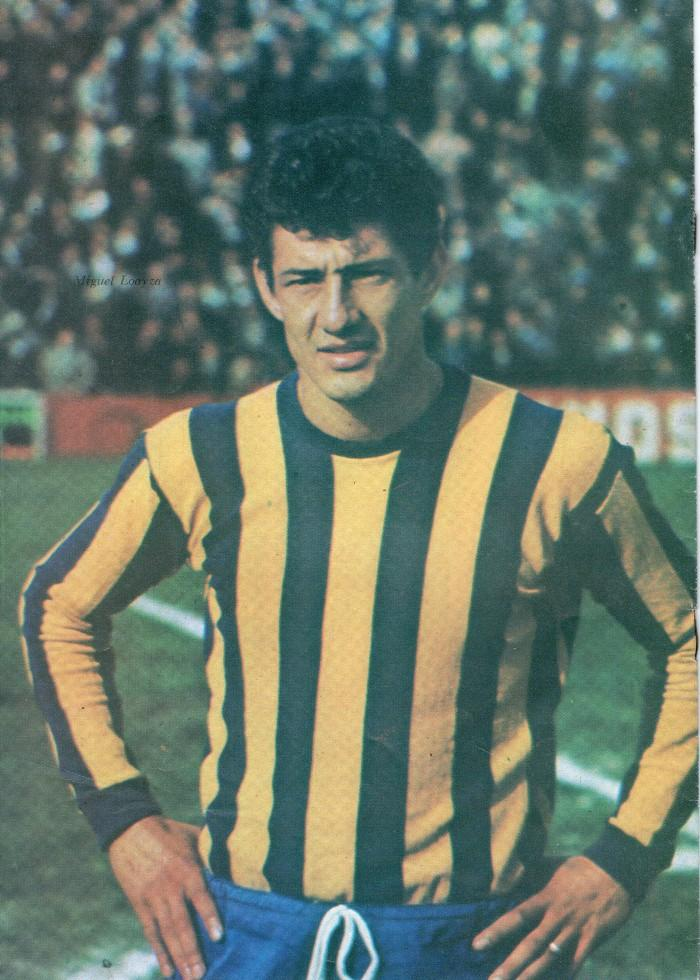
Miguel Ángel Loayza

=== January ===
- 20 January – José Luis Astigarraga Lizarralde, Roman Catholic bishop (b. 1940).

=== March ===
- 27 March – Armando Nieto, Roman Catholic priest and historian (b. 1931).

=== April ===
- 11 April – José Ramón Gurruchaga Ezama, Roman Catholic prelate, Bishop of Huaraz and Lurin (b. 1931).
- 23 April – Luis Pércovich Roca, politician, Prime Minister 1984–1985 (b. 1931).

=== June ===
- 14 June – Luis Abanto Morales, singer and composer (b. 1923)

=== July ===
- 14 July – Pedro Richter Prada, politician, Prime Minister 1979–1980 (b. 1921).
- 20 July – Wilindoro Cacique, 75, Amazonian cumbia musician (Juaneco y Su Combo).

=== August ===
- 21 August – Arturo Corcuera, poet (b. 1935).
- 28 August – Angélica Mendoza de Ascarza, human rights activist (b. 1929).

=== September ===
- 13 September – Saby Kamalich, film and television actress (b. 1939).
- 24 September – Carlos Vidal Layseca, physician, Minister of Health and Rector of Cayetano Heredia University (b. 1931).

=== October ===
- 9 October – Fernando de Szyszlo, painter, sculptor and printmaker (b. 1925).
- 19 October – Miguel Ángel Loayza, football player (b. 1940).
