= 2018 in Peru =

- Decades: 1990s; 2000s; 2010s; 2020s
- See also: Other events of 2018; Timeline of Peruvian history

Events in the year 2018 in Peru.

== Incumbents ==
- President: Pedro Pablo Kuczynski (until 23 March), Martín Vizcarra (since 23 March)
- First Vice President: Martín Vizcarra (until 23 March)
- Prime Minister: Mercedes Aráoz

== Events ==
- 2 January – The 2018 Pasamayo bus crash, killing at least 48.
- 14 January – A 7.1 magnitude earthquake struck Peru.
- 23 March – First Vice President Martín Vizcarra becomes new President of Peru after resignation of President Pedro Pablo Kuczynski.
- 24 April – 2018 Lima fire attack, causes 10 to be injured and 1 death.

== Publications ==
- José Sabogal Wiesse: Agricultura tradicional yunga (Yunga traditional agriculture).

=== Story ===
- Gabriela Cuba Espinoza: Sólo humanos (Only human).

=== Anthology ===
- Gloria Mendoza Borda (anthologist): Un otoño azul (A blue autumn).

== Cinema ==
- Todos somos marineros (We are all sailors) by Miguel Ángel Moulet.

== Deaths ==
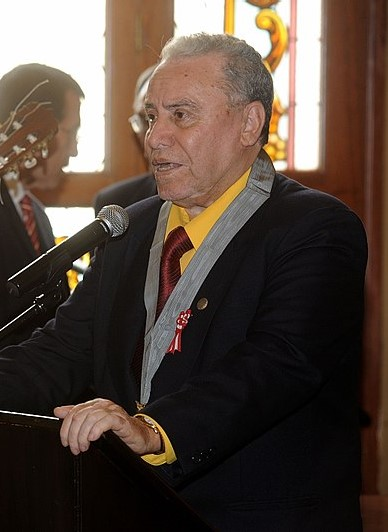
Augusto Polo Campos

- 17 January – Augusto Polo Campos, composer (b. 1932)
- 19 February – Hernán Alzamora, hurdler, (b. 1927)
- 19 February – Daniel Peredo, sports journalist (b. 1969)
- 27 March – José Hugo Garaycoa Hawkins, Roman Catholic bishop (b. 1930)
- 5 April – Jaime Thorne León, politician, Minister of Defense (2010–2011) (b. 1943).
- 16 July – Jaime Guardia, charango player (b. 1933)
- 27 July – Marco Aurelio Denegri, Peruvian television host and sexologist (b. 1938)
