= Vacchelli =

Vacchelli is an Italian surname. Notable people with the surname include:

- Gian Carlo Vacchelli (1981–2020), Peruvian sports commentator and Fujimorist politician
- Piergiuseppe Vacchelli (born 1937), Adjunct Secretary Emeritus of the Congregation for the Evangelization of Peoples and President of the Pontifical Missionary Societies

== See also ==
- Bacchelli
