= Manuel Ulloa Elías =

Peruvian politician and economist

President of the Senate
- In office 26 July 1984 – 26 July 1985
- Preceded by: Ricardo Monteagudo
- Succeeded by: Luis Alberto Sánchez

Prime Minister of Peru
- In office 28 July 1980 – 9 December 1982
- President: Fernando Belaúnde
- Preceded by: Pedro Richter Prada
- Succeeded by: Fernando Schwalb

Minister of Economy, Finance and Commerce
- In office 28 July 1980 – 9 December 1982
- President: Fernando Belaúnde
- Prime Minister: Manuel Ulloa Elías
- Preceded by: Javier Silva Ruete
- Succeeded by: Carlos Rodríguez Pastor

Member of the Senate
- In office 26 July 1980 – 26 July 1990
- Constituency: National

Minister of Finance and Commerce
- In office 1 June 1968 – 3 October 1968
- President: Fernando Belaúnde
- Prime Minister: Oswaldo Hercelles García; Miguel Mujica Gallo
- Preceded by: Francisco Morales-Bermúdez
- Succeeded by: Ángel Valdivia Morriberón

Personal details
- Born: 12 November 1922 Lima, Peru
- Died: 9 August 1992 (aged 69) Madrid, Spain
- Party: Popular Action
- Education: National University of San Marcos (LLB)
- Occupation: Politician

Manuel Ulloa Elías (12 November 1922 – 9 August 1992) was a Peruvian politician and economist. He was Prime Minister (1980–1982), Minister of Economy and Finance (1968; 1980–1982) and President of the Senate from July 1984 to July 1985.

== Early life and education ==
His father was the former Foreign minister Alberto Ulloa Sotomayor and his great-grandfather the president Domingo Elías.

Ulloa studied at Maristas San Isidro School and Colegio de la Inmaculada. He later attended the University of San Marcos, where he studied law.

== Career ==
While he was pursuing his degree, he joined the Lima office of W.R. Grace & Co. in 1940. In 1952, Ulloa was transferred to the company's headquarters in New York, named general manager of one of the subsidiaries in 1955 and appointed Manager of Planning & Development to the West Coast in 1957. The next year, he joined as vice-president to Deltec Baking Co., the Rockefeller family's Latin American investment company. Promoted to president in 1960, he was also named executive officer of the various subsidiaries and diversified companies of Deltec in Venezuela, Chile, Argentina, Brazil and Peru as well as Vice President of Deltec Investment Development, executive vice president of Deltec Panamericana, vice chairman bu of Del Peru Financiera and general manager of Société d'Investissement Le Fonds Deltec pour l'Amérique Latine in Luxembourg. In 1965, he bought a controlling interest in the Peruvian tabloid Expreso and its sister paper, Extra.

=== Political career ===
As President of Deltec, the bank operations mainly consisted of and acted as a lender with high interest rates to local companies, governments and industries. Particularly, these loans increased the Peruvian debt and contributed to the financial crisis of the following years. Ulloa resigned from Deltec in 1967 and President Fernando Belaunde appointed him Minister of Finance the next year. In October 1968, a military coup led by General Velasco overthrew the Belaunde's Administration and Ulloa went into exile in Spain. His newspapers were expropriated by the regime in 1970.

In Spain, Ulloa founded an art gallery and took and active part in the tourism and property development boom on the Costa del Sol. He returned to Peru in 1977 and participated in the reorganization of Belaúnde's party Acción Popular as head of the government planning committee. After the fall of the military government in 1980, his newspapers were returned to him and he was elected a member of the Senate in the general election of that year. As soon as he was elected President of the Republic, Belaunde appointed Ulloa Prime Minister and Minister of Finance. From 1980 to 1982 Ulloa worked to restore the country's credibility with the international financial community ensuring a healthy inflow of foreign loans and carrying out Peru's first ever thoroughgoing tax reform. In August 1982, the Prime Minister and his cabinet were interpellated for almost 50 hours and, despite Ulloa obtained a motion of confidence, he resigned four months later.

Ulloa returned to his seat and was elected President of the Senate for the 1984–1985 term. In 1985, he ran unsuccessfully for the Popular Action's presidential nomination, losing to Javier Alva Orlandini. Instead, he headed the list of Congress' candidates and was re-elected to the Senate for the 1985–1990 term. In the 1990 general election, he was re-elected to the Senate under the FREDEMO list.

For many years, he was a member of the International Council of the Museum of Modern Art (MoMA).

He died in exile in Madrid, Spain in 1992 in aftermath of the 1992 constitutional crisis.

== Family ==
He married firstly Carmen García Elmore, daughter of Carlos García Gastañeta, CEO of the local W. R. Grace and Company office. Next he married a Belgian, Nadine van Peborgh, with whom he had two sons, Manuel Jr. and Fernando. He married thirdly in 1978 Isabel Zorraquín, Marquise of Mariño, the divorced wife of Vicente Sartorius y Cabeza de Vaca. Lastly in 1987 Ulloa married Princess Elizabeth of Yugoslavia. They separated in 1989, but did not divorce, so Elizabeth became Ulloa's official widow when he died in 1992. From 1990 to 1992 he had a close relationship with the Peruvian writer and socialite Maki Miró Quesada.

Political offices
Preceded by Pedro Richter Prada	Prime Minister of Peru; 1980 – 1982	Succeeded by Fernando Schwalb López Aldana
