= El imperio socialista de los Incas =

L’empire socialiste des Incas better known from its Spanish translation El imperio socialista de los Incas is a book-length history essay about the Inca Empire and socialism. The book was originally published in French by Louis Baudin in 1928 and was first translated into Spanish by José Antonio Arze. Among various arguments the book posits that the equitative distribution of goods and allowances in the Empire were a socialist characteristics. According to historian Alberto Flores Galindo the popularity of the book in Peru was indebted to an idealization of the past in which the time of the Incas was one without injustice, hunger and with social equity, but in fact the book was written from a point of view critical to socialism.
