= Fernando Belaúnde =

President of Peru (1963–1968 and 1980–1985)

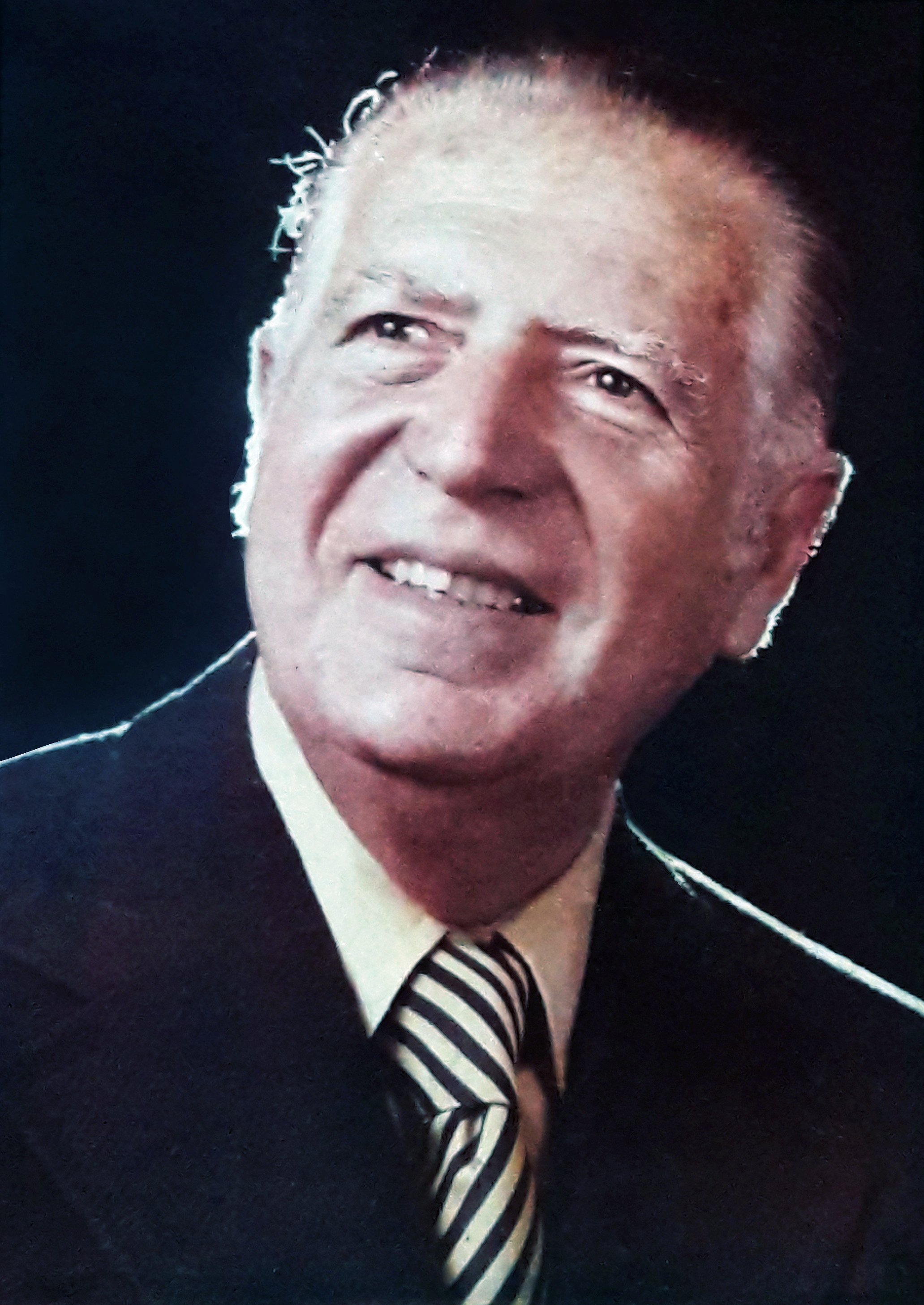
- Belaúnde in 1990

President of Peru
- In office 28 July 1980 – 28 July 1985
- Prime Minister: Manuel Ulloa Elías; Fernando Schwalb; Sandro Mariátegui Chiappe; Luis Pércovich Roca
- Vice President: Fernando Schwalb; Javier Alva Orlandini
- Preceded by: Francisco Morales Bermúdez (as President of the Armed Forces Revolutionary Government)
- Succeeded by: Alan García
- In office 28 July 1963 – 3 October 1968
- Prime Minister: Julio Óscar Trelles Montes; Fernando Schwalb; Daniel Becerra de la Flor; Edgardo Seoane Corrales; Raúl Ferrero Rebagliati; Oswaldo Hercelles García; Miguel Mujica Gallo
- Vice President: Edgardo Seoane; Mario Polar Ugarteche
- Preceded by: Nicolás Lindley López (as President of the Military Junta)
- Succeeded by: Juan Velasco Alvarado (as President of the Armed Forces Revolutionary Government)

Senator for Life Former President of the Republic
- In office 26 July 1985 – 5 April 1992

Member of the Chamber of Deputies
- In office 28 July 1945 – 29 October 1948
- Constituency: Lima

Leader of Popular Action
- In office 7 July 1956 – 2001
- Preceded by: Party founded
- Succeeded by: Valentín Paniagua (as Party President)

Personal details
- Born: Fernando Sergio Marcelo Marcos Belaúnde Terry; 7 October 1912 Lima, Peru
- Died: 4 June 2002 (aged 89) Lima, Peru
- Party: Popular Action
- Spouse(s): Violeta Correa Miller; Carola Aubry Bravo
- Children: 3
- Relatives: Rafael Belaúnde (grandson)
- Education: University of Miami; University of Texas at Austin
- Profession: Architect

Fernando Sergio Marcelo Marcos Belaúnde Terry (Note: Spanish pronunciation: [feɾˌnando ˌseɾxjo maɾˌselo ˌmaɾkos belaˌunde ˈteri]) (7 October 1912 – 4 June 2002) was a Peruvian politician who twice served as President of Peru (1963–1968 and 1980–1985). Deposed by a military coup in 1968, he was re-elected in 1980 after twelve years of military rule.

== Early life and education ==
The second of four children, Belaúnde was born in Lima into a wealthy aristocratic family of Spanish forebears: his father, Rafael Belaúnde Diez Canseco (1886–1972), a professor, served as Prime Minister under José Bustamante y Rivero; his paternal grandfather, Mariano Andrés Belaunde, was a Finance Minister; and one of his great-grandfathers, Pedro Diez Canseco, was also President of the Republic. He attended the Sagrados Corazones Recoleta in Lima.

During the dictatorship of Augusto B. Leguía, the persecution for the political activities of his father Rafael and his uncle Víctor Andrés Belaúnde prompted the family to move to France in 1924, where Fernando attended high school and received his initial University education in engineering.

From 1930 to 1935, Belaúnde studied architecture in the United States, first attending the University of Miami, where his father was teaching, and transferring in 1935 to the University of Texas at Austin, where he obtained his degree in architecture. He would later become pro-American and became very proficient in the English language, with some referring to him as "Fred Blundy".

== Career ==
In 1935, he moved to Mexico and worked as an architect for a brief time, but returned to Peru in 1936 and started his professional career as an architect designing private homes. In 1937, he started a magazine called El Arquitecto Peruano ("Peruvian Architect"), which dealt with interior design, general urbanism and housing problems the country was facing. This also gave way to the Architects Association of Peru and the Urbanism Institute of Peru.

As a result, Belaúnde also became a government public-housing consultant throughout the country and abroad. In 1943, Belaúnde began teaching architecture and urban planning at Escuela Nacional de Ingenieros of Lima and later became the dean of the Civil Engineering and Architecture department. Belaúnde also directed the construction, along with other professors and students, of the faculty of architecture of the National University of Engineering in 1955.

=== Political career ===
Belaúnde's political career began in 1944 as cofounder of the National Democratic Front party which elected José Bustamante as president in 1945; he served in the Peruvian Congress until a coup by General Manuel Odría in 1948 interrupted democratic elections.

Belaúnde returned to the political arena in 1956, when the outgoing Odría dictatorship called for elections and he led the slate submitted by the "National Front of Democratic Youth", an organization formed by reform-minded university students, some of which had studied under him; his principled support for the La Prensa newspaper, which had been closed down by the dictatorship in early 1956, had prompted the leadership of the National Front to approach him as to lead its slate.

==== "El Manguerazo" ====
He gained notoriety on June 1 of the same year when, after the national election board refused to accept his candidacy filing, he led a massive protest that became known as the "manguerazo" or "hosedown" from the powerful water cannons used by the police to repress the demonstrators. When it seemed that the confrontation was going to turn violent, Belaúnde showed the gift for symbolism that would serve him well throughout his political life; calming down the demonstrators and armed solely with a Peruvian flag, he crossed alone the gap separating the demonstrators from the police to deliver an ultimatum to the police chief that his candidacy be accepted.

The government capitulated, and the striking image of Belaúnde walking by himself with the flag was featured by the news magazine Caretas the following day, in an article entitled "Así Nacen Los Líderes" ("This is how Leaders are Born").

=== Founding Acción Popular ===
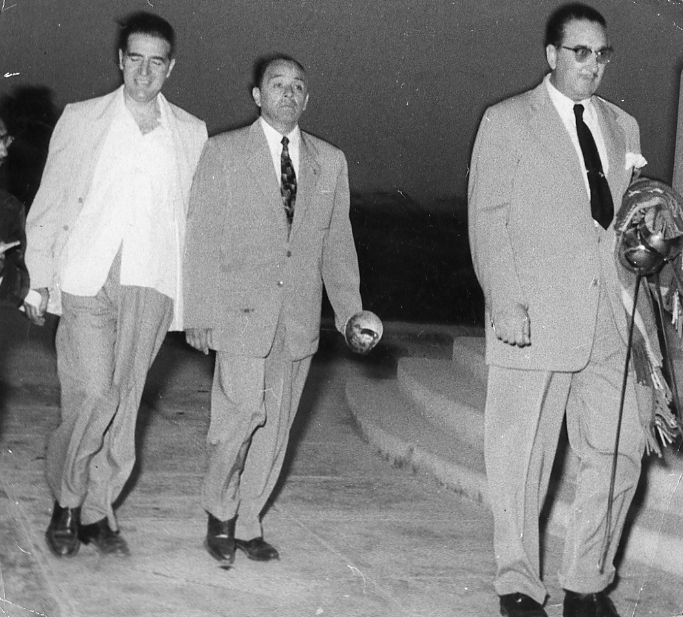
Belaúnde following a duel in 1957.

Belaúnde's 1956 candidacy was ultimately unsuccessful, as the dictatorship-favored right-wing candidacy of Manuel Prado took first place. Claiming irregularities, he prepared to lead the opposition, and in July 1956 in Chincheros, Cuzco, founded the center-right Acción Popular party, claiming the mantle of recapturing indigenous Inca traditions of community and cooperation in a modern social democratic context, placing itself squarely between the pro-oligarchy right-wing and the radicalism of the left-wing APRA and communist parties.

He would go on to travel extensively throughout the country, fleshing out the ideological principles of Acción Popular, while leading the opposition. During this period Belaúnde's traditionalism would manifest itself in dramatic flourishes, most notoriously when he challenged to a duel a Pradista congressman who refused to retract insulting statements in an open letter; the duel took place, with minor scratches on both sides.

In 1959, the Prado government's refusal to authorize the permits for the Accion Popular annual convention led to another confrontation: Belaúnde led the opening of the convention in defiance of the prohibition, and the Prado government arrested and jailed him in the Alcatraz-like island prison of El Frontón off the Lima coast. The imprisonment lasted 12 days, during which Belaúnde engaged in a failed attempt to escape by swimming to freedom; the Prado government, facing unrelenting public pressure, was forced to release him and drop all charges.

Belaúnde ran for president once again in the general elections of 1962, this time with his own party, Acción Popular. The results were very tight; he ended in second place, following Víctor Raúl Haya de la Torre (APRA), by less than 14,000 votes. Since none of the candidates managed to get the constitutionally-established minimum of one third of the vote required to win outright, selection of the President would fall to Congress; the long-held antagonistic relationship between the military and APRA prompted Haya de la Torre to make a deal with former dictator Odría, who had come in third, which would result in Odría taking the Presidency in a coalition government.

However, widespread allegations of fraud prompted the Peruvian military to depose Prado and install a military junta, led by Ricardo Pérez Godoy. Pérez Godoy ran a short transitional government and held new elections in 1963, which were won by Belaúnde by a more comfortable but still narrow five percent margin.

=== First presidency (1963–1968) ===
During Belaúnde's first term in office, he spurred numerous developmental projects. Belaúnde held a doctrine called "The Conquest of Peru by Peruvians", which promoted the exploitation of resources in the Amazon rainforest and other outlying areas of Peru through conquest, stating "only by turning our vision to the interior, and conquering our wilderness as the United States once did, will South America finally achieve true development". These included the Carretera Marginal de la Selva, a highway linking Chiclayo on the Pacific coast with then isolated northern regions of Amazonas and San Martín. In 1964, the Belaúnde administration targeted the Matsés indigenous group after two loggers were killed, with the Peruvian armed forces using aircraft to drop napalm on the Matsés who were armed only with bows and arrows, killing hundreds of them.

He also advanced the ambitious Santiago Antunez de Mayolo and Chira Piura irrigation projects, and the Tinajones, Jequetepeque, Majes, Chavimochic, Olmos, Chinecas hydroelectric projects. Belaúnde also oversaw the establishment of the Peruvian National Bank (Banco de la Nación). To alleviate poverty, Belaúnde also promoted a program of "social interest" homes in Lima and other cities, which benefited dozen thousands of families. Legal recognition was also given to hundreds of indigenous Indian communities, the hospital network was expanded into uncovered areas, and improvements were made in social security coverage. However, his administration was also blamed for making bad economic decisions, and by 1967 the sol had become seriously devalued.

In August 1968, the Belaúnde Administration announced the settlement of a long-standing dispute with a subsidiary of Standard Oil of New Jersey over claims to the rich La Brea and Pariñas oil fields. However, widespread anger about Belaúnde's decision to pay the Standard Oil compensation for handing over the installation to Peru forced his cabinet to resign on October 1. A further cause of anger was that the document of agreement was given by Belaúnde to the press with the final page (page 11) missing and signatures were squeezed at the bottom of page 10. The missing page became a cause célèbre and was later shown on television containing the contribution that Belaúnde had promised to pay.

The military's ideology at the time had also distanced itself from the wealthy elite, with the Center of High Military Studies promoting studies of Manuel González Prada and José Carlos Mariátegui for about a decade, creating officers that believed the elite were sacrificing Peru's sovereignty in exchange for foreign capital and that such practices resulted with an undeveloped, reliant nation. Several days after the Standard Oil controversy, Belaúnde was removed from office by a military coup led by general Juan Velasco Alvarado, who would go on to become dictator of Peru for seven years. Belaúnde spent the next decade in the United States, teaching at Harvard, Johns Hopkins and George Washington University. Meanwhile the military regime established by General Velasco instituted sweeping but ill-fated reforms, primarily the nationalization of the oil industry and the redistribution of land from owners of large holdings to the campesinos of Peru.

Law No. 15,260 of December 14, 1964 regulated and promoted cooperativism in Peru.

=== Second presidency (1980–1985) ===
In April 1980, with Peru's economy in deep depression, the military administration permitted an election for the restoration of constitutional rule. Belaúnde won a five-year term, polling an impressive 45 percent of the vote in a 15-man contest. One of his first actions as president was the return of several newspapers to their respective owners. In this way, freedom of speech once again played an important part in Peruvian politics. Gradually, he attempted to undo some of the most radical effects of the agrarian reform initiated by Velasco, and reversed the independent stance that the Military Government of Velasco had with the United States.

At the outbreak of the 1982 Falklands War (Spanish: Guerra de las Malvinas) between Argentina and the United Kingdom, Belaúnde declared that Peru was ready to support Argentina with all the resources it needed. This included a number of fighter planes from the Peruvian Air Force, ships, and medical teams. Belaúnde's government proposed a peace settlement between the two countries, but the Argentine military junta rejected it and the British launched an attack on the Argentinian forces deployed around the islands. In response to Chile's support of Britain, Belaúnde called for Latin American unity.

In domestic policy, he continued with many of the projects that were planned during his first term, including the completion of what is considered his most important legacy, the Carretera Marginal de la Selva, a much-needed roadway linking Chiclayo on the Pacific coast with then isolated northern regions of Amazonas and San Martín.

After a promising beginning, Belaúnde's popularity eroded under the stress of inflation, the War on Housing's continuation, economic hardship, and terrorism: per capita income declined, Peru's foreign debt burgeoned, and violence by leftist insurgents (notably Shining Path) rose steadily during the internal conflict in Peru, which was launched the day before Belaúnde was elected in 1980. He was president during the peak of the Lost Decade, in which unemployment rose above 50% and homelessness rose above 30%.

"Amnesty International's letters go in the trash ... I do not accept them."

— Fernando Belaúnde, 1983

Regarding Shining Path, Belaúnde was aware of how serious the threat was, he failed to develop solid policy to combat the group and military officers under his administration reportedly committed human rights violations. States of emergencies were declared in the Ayacucho and Apurímac regions. When mass graves were discovered, mainstream media in Peru defended Belaúnde, instead directing attacks at left-wing opposition. In 1984, General Luis Cisneros Vizquerra said that no human rights existed during a period of war, criticizing human rights groups and the media condemning abuses by the military. When Amnesty International raised concerns to Belaúnde, he chose to ignore reports of hundreds of civilians being killed in summary executions. Congress, controlled by Belaúnde's Popular Action party, was also aware of human rights abuses, refusing to investigate them. Thousands would die during the conflict during Belaúnde's tenure.

During the next years, the economic problems left over from the military government persisted, worsened by an occurrence of the "El Niño" weather phenomenon in 1982–83, which caused widespread flooding in some parts of the country, severe droughts in others, and sharply reduced the schools of ocean fish that are one of the country's major resources.

=== Post-presidency (1985–2002) ===
During the national elections of 1985, Belaúnde's party, Acción Popular, was defeated by APRA candidate Alan García. However, as established in the 1979 Constitution, he would go on to serve in the Peruvian Senate as Senador Vitalicio ("senator for life"), a privilege for former Presidents abolished by the 1993 Constitution.

== Political views ==
Belaúnde’s political outlook was centre-right, pro-American, and conservative. The Guardian described him as "a 19th century politician, with a high moral purpose and a sense of civic duty, who was perfectly at home in the conservative political milieu of 20th-century Peru, which for long occupied a time-warp, unusual even in Latin America, about a century behind the rest of the world". During the Falklands War, he supported Argentina.

== Notes ==
Party political offices
Preceded by —	Acción Popular presidential candidate 1962 (lost); 1963 (won); 1980 (won)	Succeeded by Javier Alva Orlandini
Preceded by —	General Secretary of Acción Popular; July 1956 – August 2001	Succeeded by Valentín Paniagua
Political offices
Preceded by Nicolás Lindley	President of Peru; July 1963 – October 1968	Succeeded by Juan Velasco; President of the Revolutionary Government
Preceded by Francisco Morales Bermúdez	President of Peru; July 1980 – July 1985	Succeeded by Alan García
Preceded by —	Senator of the Republic of Peru; July 1985 – April 1992	Succeeded by none (Senate dissolved)
