= Gonzalo Portocarrero =

Peruvian sociologist (1949–2019)

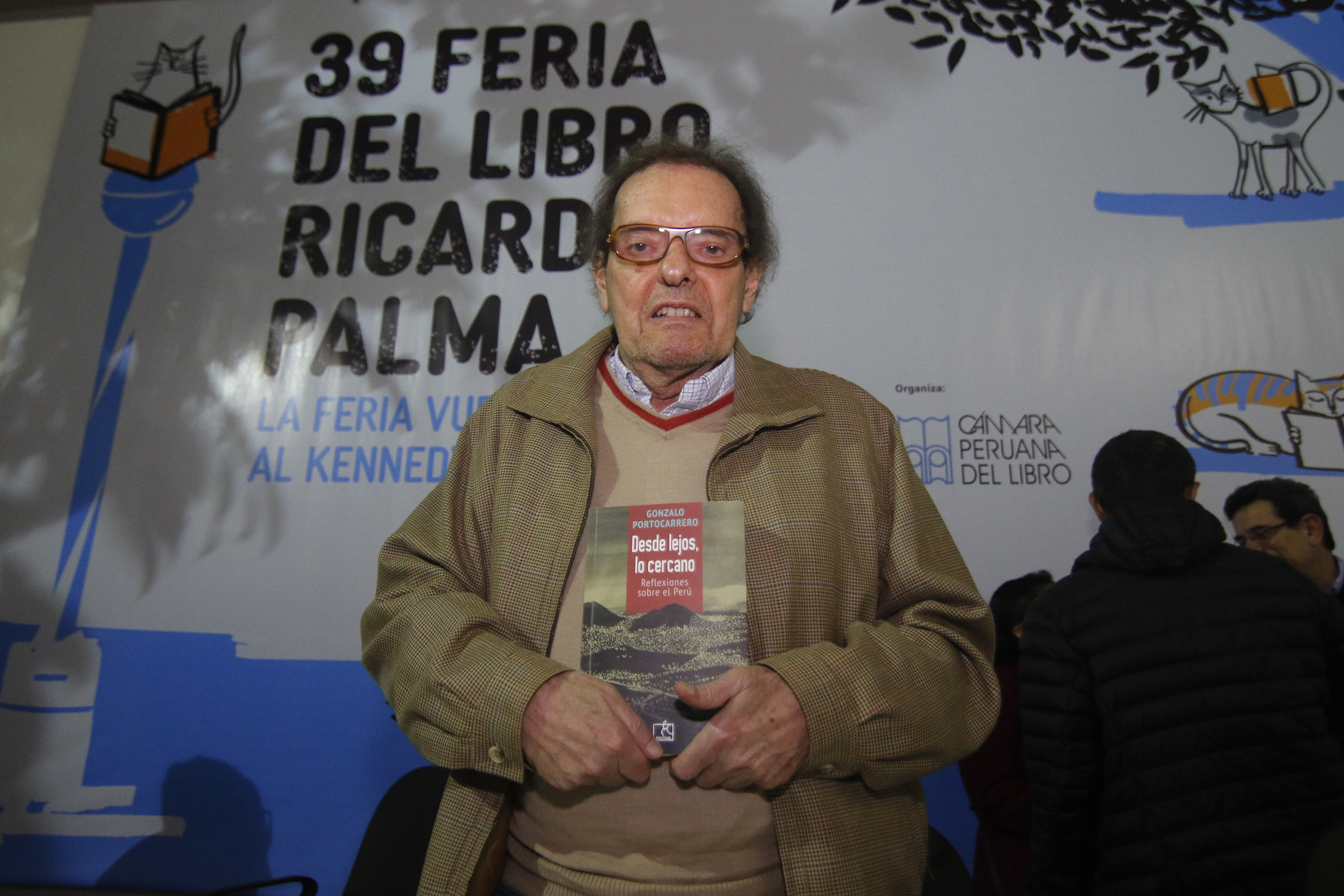
- Portocarrero in 2018
- Born: Gonzalo Javier Enrique Portocarrero Maisch; 3 December 1949; Lima, Peru
- Died: 21 March 2019 (aged 69); Lima, Peru
- Education: National University of San Marcos; Pontifical Catholic University of Peru
- Occupation: Sociologist

Gonzalo Portocarrero (December 3, 1949 – March 21, 2019) was a Peruvian sociologist, social scientist and essayist.

== Biography ==
He was born in Lima, the third of four children of Félix Portocarrero Olave and Lucrecia Maisch Von Humboldt. He studied at the private school La Recoleta. He studied Sociology at the National University of San Marcos and Letters at the Pontifical Catholic University of Peru. He was a Master in Sociology from the Latin American Social Sciences Institute (FLACSO) and doctor in the same specialty from the University of Essex (England).

He was a visiting professor at universities in the United States, Japan, Germany, Mexico, Venezuela and the United Kingdom. Until his death, he served as a professor at the Department of Social Sciences of the Pontifical Catholic University of Peru.

He was a member of the Board of Directors of the Network for the Development of Social Sciences, dynamic intellectual space for Neo-Marxist discussion of the Peruvian problem. He was Dean of the Association of Sociologists of Peru. In 2008 he created the first program of Cultural Studies in Peru, culminating the research around these topics that began in the late nineties. His work is strongly influenced by the imprint left by the historian Alberto Flores Galindo. Among other distinctions, he was recognized as Doctor Honoris Causa by the National University of the Center of Peru and was awarded the National Culture Award by the Ministry of Culture.

On March 21, 2019, at the age of 69, he died from lung cancer.

== Works ==
- De Bustamante a Odría. El fracaso del frente democrático nacional. 1945-1950 (1983)
- El Perú desde la escuela (1989)
- Las clases medias: Entre la pretensión y la incertidumbre (1998)
- Razones de sangre. Aproximaciones a la violencia política (1998)
- Rostros criollos del mal (2004)
- Racismo y mestizaje (2007)
- Figuraciones del mundo juvenil en el cine contemporáneo (2010)
- Oído en el silencio. Ensayos de crítica cultural (2010)
- Profetas del odio (2012)
- Utopía del blanqueamiento y la lucha por el mestizaje (2013)
- La urgencia por decir "nosotros". Los intelectuales y la idea de nación en el Perú republicano (2015)
- Imaginando al Perú. Búsquedas desde lo andino en arte y literatura (2016)
