= 2016 in Peru =

- Decades: 1990s; 2000s; 2010s; 2020s
- See also: Other events of 2016; Timeline of Peruvian history

This article lists events from the year 2016 in Peru.

== Incumbents ==
- President: Ollanta Humala (until 28 July) Pedro Pablo Kuczynski (from 28 July)
- First Vice President: Marisol Espinoza (until 28 July) Martín Vizcarra (from 28 July)
- Second Vice President: Omar Chehade (until 28 July) Mercedes Aráoz (from 28 July)
- Prime Minister: Pedro Cateriano (until 28 July) Fernando Zavala Lombardi (from 28 July)

== Events ==
- 10 April – 2016 Peruvian general election
- 28 July – Pedro Pablo Kuczynski took over as president

== Publications ==
=== Poetry ===
- Rossella Di Paolo: La silla en el mar (The chair in the sea).

=== Novel ===
- Isabel Sabogal: Un Universo dividido (A divided Universe).

=== Anthology ===
- Ricardo Silva Santisteban (anthologist): Antología general de la traducción en el Perú (General anthology of translation in Peru), volume VII.

== Cinema ==
- Extirpator of Idolatries by Manuel Siles.
- Videophilia (and Other Viral Syndromes) by Juan Daniel F. Molero.

== Sport ==
- 5-21 August – Peru at the 2016 Summer Olympics: 29 competitors in 11 sports

== Deaths ==
- 17 February – Eduardo Chirinos, poet (b. 1960).
- 26 February – Juan Conway McNabb, Roman Catholic bishop (b. 1925).
- 6 March – María Rostworowski, historian (b. 1915).

== Links ==
Media related to 2016 in Peru at Wikimedia Commons
