= Fernando Schwalb =

Peruvian politician (1916–2002)

Fernando Schwalb López-Aldana
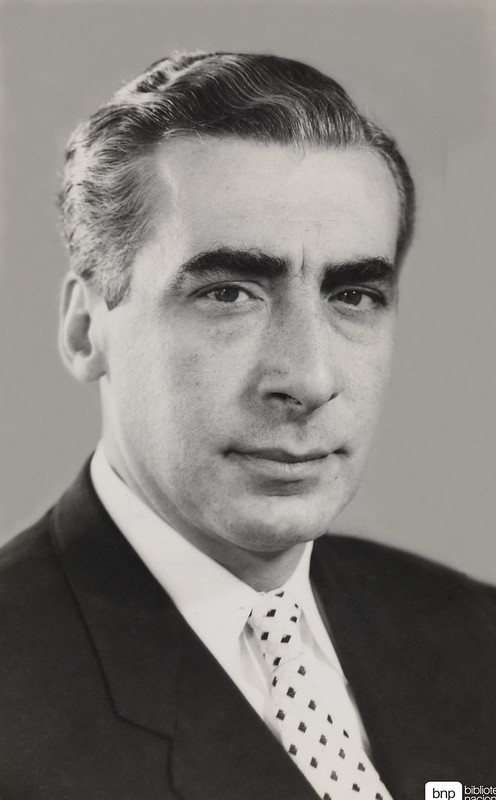

Prime Minister of Peru
- In office 9 December 1982 – 10 April 1984
- President: Fernando Belaúnde
- Preceded by: Manuel Ulloa Elías
- Succeeded by: Sandro Mariátegui Chiappe
- In office 31 December 1963 – 15 September 1965
- President: Fernando Belaúnde
- Preceded by: Julio Óscar Trelles Montes
- Succeeded by: Daniel Becerra de la Flor

Minister of Foreign Relations
- In office 3 January 1983 – 10 April 1984
- President: Fernando Belaúnde
- Preceded by: Javier Arias Stella
- Succeeded by: Sandro Mariátegui Chiappe
- In office 28 July 1963 – 15 September 1965
- President: Fernando Belaúnde
- Preceded by: Luis Edgardo Llosa
- Succeeded by: Jorge Vásquez Salas

First Vice President of Peru
- In office 28 July 1980 – 28 July 1985
- President: Fernando Belaúnde
- Preceded by: Edgardo Seoane (1968)
- Succeeded by: Luis Alberto Sánchez

Personal details
- Born: 26 August 1916 Arequipa, Peru
- Died: 22 July 2002 (aged 85) Lima, Peru
- Party: Popular Action
- Other political affiliations: Frente Democrático Nacional
- Spouse: María Jesús Rivera

Fernando Schwalb López Aldana (Lima, 26 August 1916 – Lima, 22 July 2002) was a former Prime Minister of Peru, and held the position twice (1963–1965, 1983–1984). He also served as the first Vice President of Peru from July 1980 to July 1985. Between 1980 and 1982, he was ambassador to the United States.

He became president of the Central Reserve Bank in 1966 and served until 1968.

== Biography ==
His parents were Joaquín Schwalb Ramos and María López-Aldana Hugues. He studied at the Colegio Sagrados Corazones Recoleta (1923–1932). His higher studies were carried out at the Pontifical Catholic University of Peru, where he graduated with a bachelor's degree in Law, and at the Universidad Nacional Mayor de San Marcos, where he received a law degree (November 27, 1940).

In 1933 he joined the diplomatic service, going through various auxiliary jobs until he became second secretary, being assigned to the United States embassy in 1944. He was a member of the Peruvian delegation accredited to the brand new United Nations, in 1946. Al the following year he was promoted to first secretary. In 1948 he was elevated to Minister Counselor, but resigned from the diplomatic service after the coup d'état of General Manuel A. Odría.

He returned to Peru, where he devoted himself to the exercise of his profession and alternately collaborated in the press.

He was one of the organizers of the Popular Action Party, of which he was Secretary General since 1960. He was elected Senator of the Republic in the period 1963–1968, under the first government of the architect Fernando Belaunde Terry, who also appointed him Minister of Foreign Relations ( from July 28, 1963 to September 15, 1965), in his first ministerial cabinet, chaired by Óscar Trelles. Censored this, Schwalb replaced him in the presidency of the Council of Ministers (from December 31, 1963 to September 15, 1965), maintaining the portfolio of Foreign Relations. He was also President of the Central Reserve Bank of Peru (1966–1968).

After the coup by the Armed Forces commanded by General Juan Velasco Alvarado, he left the country (1968). Abroad he exercised trustworthy functions in international credit organizations.

He supported his Popular Action party in the campaign in favor of democratic restoration and ran for the first vice presidency in the formula headed by Belaunde, who triumphed for the second time in the general elections of 1980. Shortly after the inauguration of this second Belaundista government, he passed to be ambassador of Peru in the United States of America.

Faced with the resignation of the cabinet chaired by Manuel Ulloa Elías, motivated by attrition, Schwalb was summoned to preside over the Council of Ministers and assume the Foreign Relations portfolio (from January 3, 1983 to April 10, 1984).

Later, he was ambassador on a special mission to the United States and Canada, as a result of the border conflict between Peru and Ecuador in 1995. He was also, that same year, president of the Foreign Relations committee.

Political offices
Preceded by Julio Óscar Trelles Montes	Prime Minister of Peru; 1963–1965	Succeeded by Daniel Becerra de la Flor
Preceded by Manuel Ulloa Elías	Prime Minister of Peru; 1983–1984	Succeeded by Sandro Mariátegui Chiappe
