= Bacchelli =

Bacchelli is an Italian surname. Notable people with the surname include:

- Fulvio Bacchelli (born 1951), former Italian rally driver
- Riccardo Bacchelli (1891 – 1985), Italian writer

== See also ==
- Bacchelli (singer)
- Vacchelli
