= Javier Alva Orlandini =

Peruvian lawyer and politician (1927–2020)

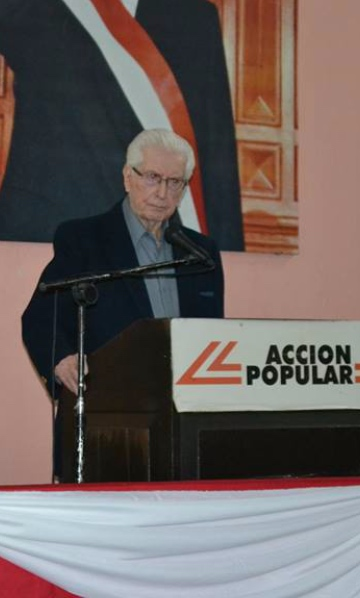

President of the Constitutional Tribunal of Peru
- In office December 2, 2002 – December 2, 2005
- Preceded by: Guillermo Rey Terr
- Succeeded by: Víctor García Toma

Magistrate of the Constitutional Tribunal of Peru
- In office May 31, 2002 – September 19, 2007

Member of Congress
- In office July 26, 1995 – July 26, 2000
- Constituency: National

Member of the Senate
- In office July 26, 1990 – April 5, 1992
- Constituency: National
- In office July 26, 1980 – July 26, 1985
- Constituency: National

President of the Senate
- In office July 26, 1981 – July 26, 1982
- Preceded by: Julio Óscar Trelles Montes
- Succeeded by: Sandro Mariátegui Chiappe

Second Vice President of Peru
- In office July 28, 1980 – July 28, 1985
- President: Fernando Belaúnde
- Preceded by: Mario Polar Ugarteche (1968)
- Succeeded by: Luis Alva Castro

Minister of Government and Police
- In office November 15, 1965 – October 26, 1966
- President: Fernando Belaúnde
- Preceded by: Octavio Mongrut Muñoz
- Succeeded by: Luis Alayza Escardó

Member of the Chamber of Deputies
- In office July 28, 1963 – October 3, 1968
- Constituency: Lima

Personal details
- Born: December 11, 1927 Cajamarca, Peru
- Died: June 1, 2020 (aged 92) Lima, Peru
- Cause of death: Fracture
- Party: Popular Action
- Education: National University of San Marcos

Javier Alva Orlandini (December 11, 1927 – June 1, 2020) was a peruvian lawyer and politician. A prominent member of the political party Popular Action, he served as the President of the party. He served as the Second Vice President of Peru during the government of Fernando Belaúnde from 1980 to 1985. Throughout his life he became a Deputy (1963–1968), Minister of Government and Police (1965–1966), Senator (1980–1985 and 1990–1992), President of the Senate (1981–1982), and Congressman (1995–2000). In 2002, he became a Magistrate of the Constitutional Court, at the same time being elected by Congress as the President of the Court for a 3-year term. He was a candidate for the Presidency of the Republic in 1985, but he only got 7.3% of the popular vote, placing fourth and lost the election to Alan García. He later served as President of Peru's Constitutional Tribunal from 2002 to 2005.

He wrote several books, including "Responding to the Dictatorship", "Yesterday, Today and Tomorrow", the "Vicious Circle", "I Minister", "Word of Honor" and "Yes I swear", and numerous legal articles. The audits, representative legislative, legal, academic and professional are of extensive quality and are recognized by the Peruvian people and their various institutions that have given many honorary degrees.

== Early life and education ==
He was the son of José Felipe Alva y Alva and Blanca Orlandini. His father was a lawyer, poet and senator for Cajamarca (1945–1948).

Javier attended elementary school in his hometown, then went on to Trujillo, where he attended High School at Colegio Seminario San Carlos y San Marcelo (1941–1945).

In 1946 he entered the Universidad Nacional Mayor de San Marcos, where he studied law and economics. He graduated from law school with his thesis on The Preference Pact (1952) and received his law degree on January 16, 1953.

During his time as a university student, he fought against General Manuel A. Odría's sole candidacy for the presidency (1950) and was president of the Centro Federado de los Estudiantes at the Law School (1952). Due to his political activities, he was imprisoned for three months at El Frontón.

== Political career ==
He was the founder and president of the National Front of Democratic Youth (1955), which led to the candidacy of architect Fernando Belaunde Terry for the presidency in the 1956 general elections, in which he came in second place. This political grouping gave rise shortly afterwards to the Popular Action party, whose first Ordinary National Congress was held in 1957, at which Alva was elected a member of the Plenary. In 1958, his party commissioned him to draft the new Electoral Law, which was presented to the Senate. He was then appointed Secretary of Electoral Affairs (1959) and Assistant Secretary General (1961).

During the 1962 general elections, and in his capacity as his party's representative, he denounced the alleged irregularities in the process, contributing to its annulment by the Armed Forces.

=== Deputy ===
In the 1963 general elections, he was elected deputy for Lima; among his legislative initiatives of those years was the Municipal Elections Bill.

=== Second Vice President of Peru ===
In the 1980 general elections, he was in charge of organizing Belaunde's electoral campaign, leading him to his second presidential victory and Alva Orlandini himself was elected 2nd Vice President of the Republic.

=== Senator ===
In these elections, Alva Orlandini was also elected Senator for Popular Action for the 1980-1985 parliamentary period.

In the 1990 general elections, he was again elected Senator for the Democratic Front for the 1990-1995 parliamentary term.

He was president of the Special Commissions that elaborated the Penal Code, the Penal Procedure Code, the Penal Execution Code (1991) and the Civil Procedure Code (1992).

Produced by the self-coup of 1992, his position was interrupted and he became a tenacious opponent of the Government of Alberto Fujimori.

=== Senate President ===
On July 26, 1981, he was elected president of the Senate for the period 1981-1982.

Between 1982 and 1985 he returned to be secretary general of his party.

=== Presidential campaign (1985) ===
In the 1985 general elections, he ran as a presidential candidate together with Manuel Ulloa Elías as a candidate for the first vice-presidency and Sandro Mariátegui for the second vice-presidency of the Republic. He came in fourth place, with 5% of the vote.

=== Congressman ===
In the 1995 general elections, he was elected Congressman for Popular Action for the 1995-2000 parliamentary period, and as such, he participated in the commission in charge of drafting the General Law of Companies and the Law of Securities Securities.

During his parliamentary work he showed his opposition to the Fujimori regime as well as his bench.

In the 2000 general elections, he failed to attain re-election as Congrsssman.
