= Armando Nieto =

Peruvian historian and Jesuit priest

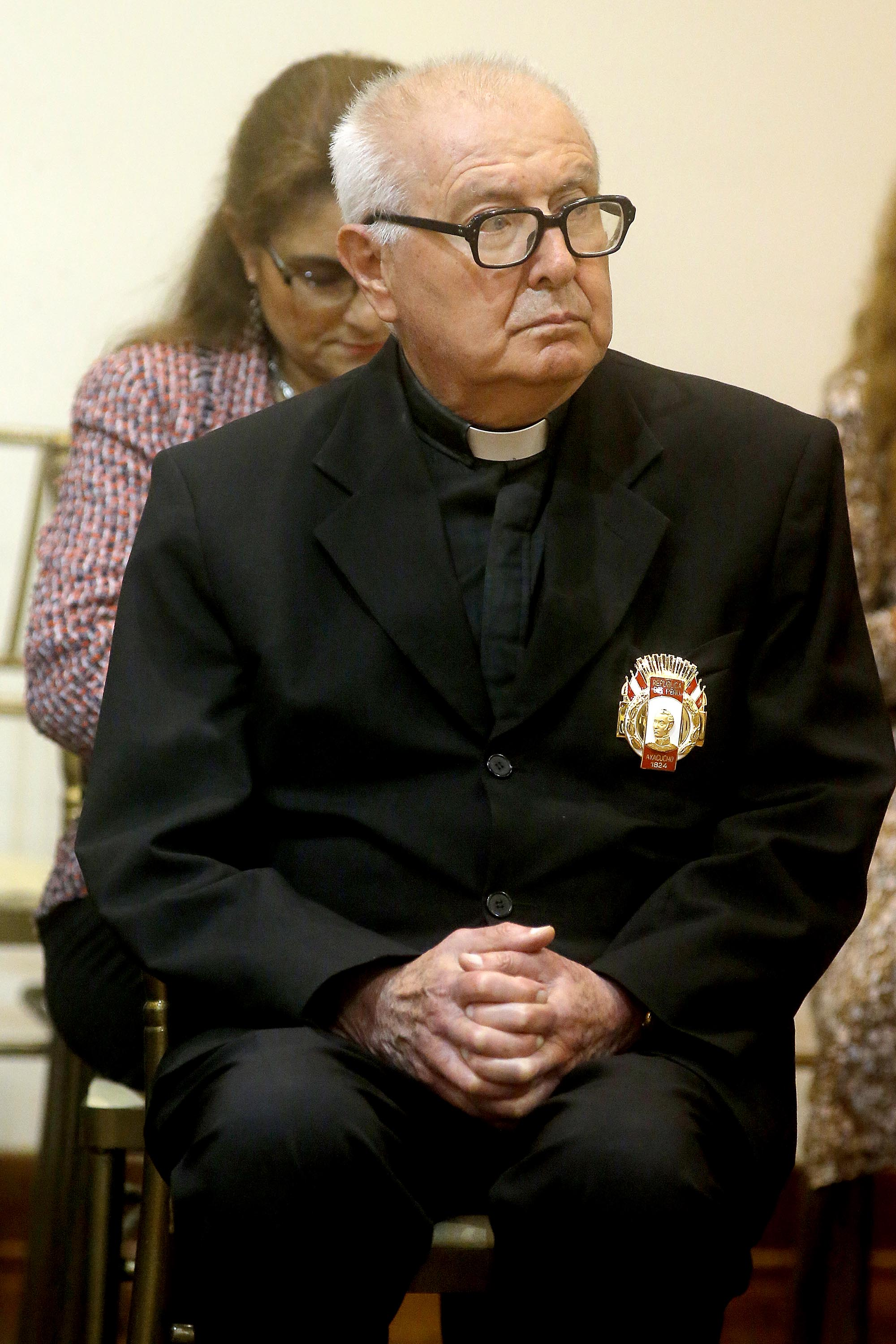
Armando Nieto Velez, 2012

Armando Nieto Vélez (24 October 1931 – 27 March 2017) was a Jesuit priest and Peruvian historian.

== Biography ==
His parents were Manuel R. Nieto and Rosa Vélez Picasso. He studied in Colegio de la Inmaculada (The Jesuit Fathers School) in Lima from 1938 to 1948. He was admitted into the Pontifical Catholic University of Peru.

He was a history professor at the Pontifical Catholic University of Peru, and was ordained a priest by the Society of Jesus in Frankfurt am Main Cathedral on 28 August 1964. In academia, he served as director of the Peruvian Center of Studies Historic-Militar, director of Riva Agüero Institute, and president of National Academy of History. As part of his pastoral activity, he was chaplain of the Sodalitium Christianae Vitae in Lima.

== Works ==
- La Iglesia (in General History of Peru. tomo V. Lima, Editorial Brasa, 1994, pp. 315–413).
- La primera evangelización en el Perú: hechos y personajes (1992)
- Francisco del Castillo, el apóstol de Lima (1992)
- Catholic Church in Peru. 5 (1980).
- History of Inmaculada High School (1978)
- Ecuadorian–Peruvian territorial dispute 1858-1859 (in Navy History of Peru; tomo VI, pp. 471–678), from manuscrites of Julio Jesús Elías.
- Antología de la Independencia del Perú (1972), with Félix Denegri Luna and Alberto Tauro del Pino.
- Contribution to history of "fidelismo" in Peru (1808-1810) (1960)

== Awards ==
- Orden al Mérito por Servicios Distinguidos, en el grado de Gran Oficial, por el gobierno del Perú (1971).
- Orden Cruz Peruana al Mérito Naval, en el grado de Gran Oficial - Distintivo Blanco, por la Marina de Guerra del Perú (2012), por estrechar los vínculos de amistad y cooperación con la Armada Peruana.

== See also ==
- Roman Catholicism in Peru
- Rubén Vargas Ugarte
