= Rubén Vargas Ugarte =

Peruvian priest and historian (1886–1975)

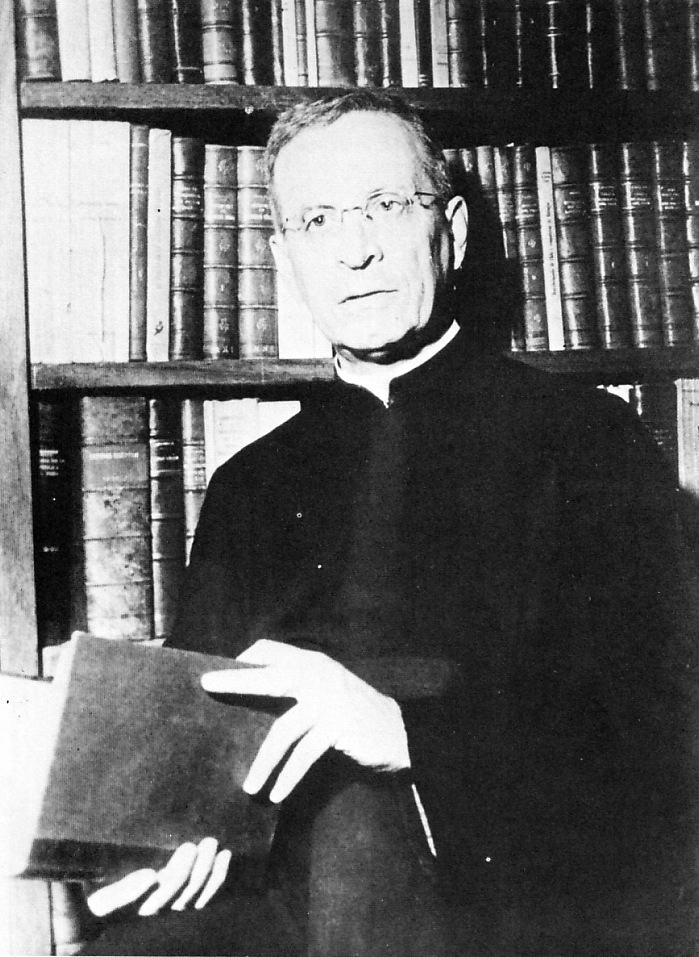
Rubén Vargas Ugarte

Rubén Vargas Ugarte (October 22, 1886 – February 14, 1975) was a Jesuit priest and Peruvian historian. He was the third president of the Pontifical Catholic University of Peru, and was ordained a priest in the Society of Jesus in 1921. He was also the Director of the National Library of Peru.

== Works ==
- General History of Peru. Edition 12 Vol. Milla Batres, Lima 1971–1984. The first five volumes are devoted to the times of the Viceroyalty and Emancipation, and the other to the Republic until 1980. The last volume (11 º to 12 º) the completed historian Margarita Guerra.
- Church History of Peru. 5 Vol Imp of Aldecoa, 1953–1962. This story only reaches to the late nineteenth century.
- Dictionary of Artificers Colonial. Lima, 1937-1944
- Life of Santa Rosa de Santa María. Lima, 1945.
- The Viceregal Peru. Editor Peruvian Typography. Lima, 1962
- History of the Society of Jesus in Peru. 4 Vol Imp of Aldecoa, Burgos 1963–1965. It covers the period from the arrival of the *Jesuits and their expulsion in 1767.
- History of Santo Cristo de los Milagros, Printing Sanmartí, 3ra.Edición Lima 1966.
- The Real Convictorio Carolino and their two luminaries. Editor Carlos Milla Batres, Lima, 1970
- General history of the Pacific War. Edit Milla Batres, Lima 1979

== See also ==
- Roman Catholicism in Peru
