= Luis Repetto =

Peruvian museologist (1953–2020)

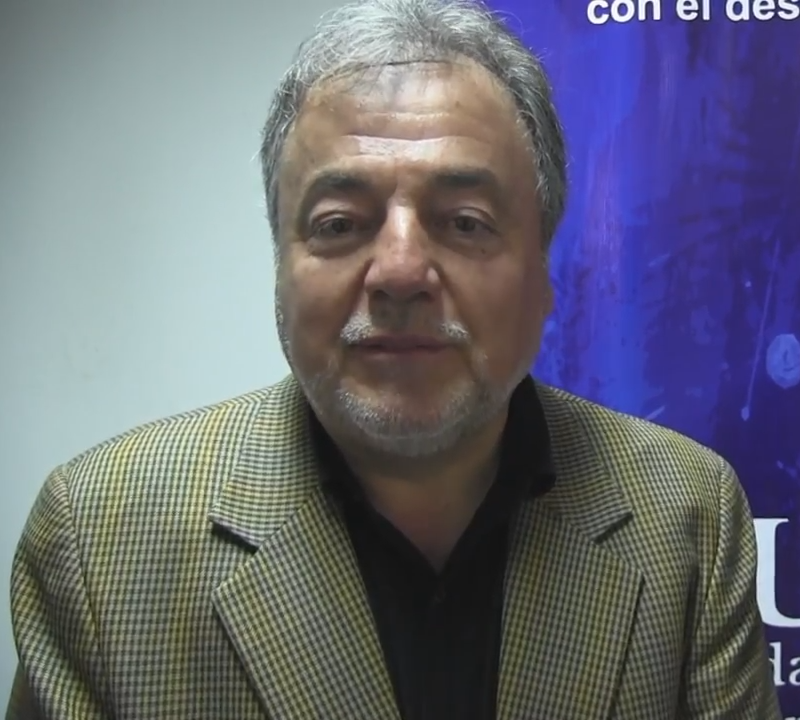
Repetto in 2013

Luis Orlando Repetto Málaga (Lima, 4 August 1953 – 9 June 2020) was a Peruvian museologist, cultural manager and television host.

== Career ==
Repetto studied at the Leoncio Prado Military Academy. He was director of the National Institute of Culture and director of the Museum of Popular Arts and Traditions of the Riva-Agüero Institute until 2018. He also served as vice president of the Peruvian Committee of the International Council of Museums ICOM-Peru and was the director of the Centrum Católica Museum of PUCP. For years he hosted the program Noches de sábado, together with Melanie Pérez Cartier, on Radio Programas del Perú. He was the host of the well-known cultural diffusion programs Museos puertas abiertas and Museos sin límites on TV Perú.

== Works ==
- In 1999 he published El arte popular peruano in Lima through the Museo Nacional de Arqueología, Antropología e Historia del Perú (MNAAHP) and the publishing house Lluvia editores.
- Through the Regional Organization for Latin America and the Caribbean of the International Council of Museums (ICOM-LAC) he published in 2003 the book Museo Presbítero Maestro : cementerio de Lima.
- Also in Lima, in 2013 he published El reino Chacha : etnografía de la región Amazonas through Museo Casa O'Higgins.

== Recognitions ==
- 2014: Meritorious Person of Culture, awarded by the Ministry of Culture of Peru.
- 2018. Medal "Toribio Rodríguez de Mendoza", awarded by the Provincial Council of Chachapoyas.

== Death ==
Repetto died in Lima on 9 June 2020, aged 66, of COVID-19 during the pandemic in Peru.
