= Pedro Richter Prada =

Peruvian politician (1921–2017)

Pedro Richter-Prada

Prime Minister of Peru
- In office 31 January 1979 – 28 July 1980
- President: Francisco Morales Bermúdez
- Preceded by: Óscar Molina Pallochia
- Succeeded by: Manuel Ulloa Elías

Minister of the Interior
- In office 18 May 1971 – 30 August 1975
- President: Juan Velasco Alvarado
- Preceded by: Armando Artola Azcárate
- Succeeded by: César Campos Quesada

Minister of Defense
- In office 31 January 1979 – 28 July 1980
- President: Juan Velasco Alvarado
- Preceded by: Óscar Molina Pallochia
- Succeeded by: Jorge Muñiz Luna

Personal details
- Born: Pedro Ángel Richter Fernández-Prada; 4 January 1921; Ayacucho, Peru
- Died: 14 July 2017 (aged 96); Lima, Peru
- Profession: Military

Pedro Ángel Richter Fernández-Prada (4 January 1921 – 14 July 2017) was a Peruvian politician who was the prime minister of Peru from January 31, 1979, until July 28, 1980. On December 28, 2007, the Italian government issued an arrest warrant for Prada for the disappearance of 25 Italian citizens in the 1970s. In February 2015, a trial started in Italy related to Operation Condor, there were indictments against 32 people, including Richter Prada. He was charged with aggravated murder. Richter Prada also served as Minister of Defense and Commander-in-Chief of the Army. According to a private death notice, Richter Prada died on 14 July 2017 aged 96.

Political offices
Preceded by Óscar Molina Pallochia	Prime Minister of Peru; 1979 – 1980	Succeeded by Manuel Ulloa Elías
