= Mario Polar Ugarteche =

Peruvian politician and writer

Mario Polar Ugarteche (Arequipa, 5 September 1912 - Lima, 16 February 1988) was a Peruvian politician and writer. He was one of the founders of the Christian Democratic Party and its first president. Later he was the founder and president of the Popular Christian Party (PPC). He was a senator of the Republic on four occasions and once a constitutional deputy (1979).

== Early life ==
He was born to Miguel Ángel Polar Vargas and Esther Ugarteche. He studied at the National College of American Independence and the Arévalo Institute in his hometown, completing his secondary studies with honors. His higher studies were completed at the National University of Saint Augustine in Arequipa, where he graduated with a doctorate in Philosophy and Letters.

From a very young age, he devoted himself to teaching, teaching at various secondary schools in Arequipa (including the Colegio de la Independencia) and, later, at the Faculty of Letters and the Faculty of Economic Sciences of the Universidad San Agustín.

He played an important role in the birth of the National Democratic Front. At that time, he met Luis Bedoya Reyes and other future associates and co-thinkers, who were then members of the "Independent Youth", a civic movement that supported President Bustamante y Rivero.

He was appointed economic and cultural adviser to the Peruvian embassy in Santiago, Chile (1946) and later was the adviser of economic affairs for the Peruvian embassy in Buenos Aires. However, his diplomatic career was cut short when President Bustamante and Rivero were overthrown by the 1948 coup.

He returned to Arequipa, where he returned to pursue secondary and university education. He was also the manager of the local chamber of commerce.

In 1950 he resumed political activity as general secretary of the nascent Democratic League in Arequipa, which faced hardship during the dictatorship of Manuel A. Odría. He was accused of sedition; however, the judicial proceedings initiated against him did not move forward.

At the end of 1955, he was the first general secretary of the Christian Democratic Movement formed in Arequipa, and following that, he participated in the Arequipa revolution of 1955, which caused the fall of Minister Alejandro Esparza Zañartu, a fact that accelerated the end of the odriista dictatorship.

When the Christian Democratic Party was founded in Lima on 10 January 1956, Mario Polar was elected as its president, with Luis Bedoya Reyes as secretary general. That same year he was elected senator for Arequipa (1956-1962). [1] He stood for reelection in 1962, but that year's elections were thwarted by the coup d'état of General Ricardo Pérez Godoy. New general elections were called in 1963, in which his party participated in alliance with Acción Popular, founded by architect Fernando Belaúnde Terry, which obtained victory. Polar was elected Second Vice President of the Republic and senator from Lima.

When the Christian People's Party (PPC) was born on 18 December 1966, split from the Christian Democratic Party, Polar became one of its main leaders, along with personalities such as Luis Bedoya Reyes, Ernesto Alayza Grundy, Antonio Espinoza Laña, Emilio Castañón Pasquel, Honorio Delgado, Juan Chaves Molina, Roberto Ramírez del Villar, and others. He had a great affinity with Ernesto Alayza.

During the military government from 1968 to 1980, he remained in opposition, calling for democratic elections, through articles published in the magazine Free Opinion (1976-1980).

He was elected deputy of the PPC to the Constituent Assembly of 1978, and served as one of the main writers of the 1979 Constitution, where he included the chapter referring to "Fundamental Rights and Duties of a Person".

He was elected senator for the period 1980 to 1985 and was reelected for the period 1985 to 1990, but he died in office in 1988.
