= Segundo Galicia Sánchez =

Peruvian writer (1938–2020)

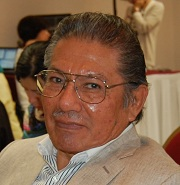
- Born: 11 August 1938; Virú, Peru
- Died: 14 December 2020 (aged 82); Mazatlán, Mexico
- Education: National University of San Marcos; National Autonomous University of Mexico
- Occupations: Professor and researcher
- Spouse: Susana Calderón Verdes

Segundo Galicia Sánchez (11 August 1938 – 14 December 2020) was a Peruvian professor and sociologist.

== Career ==
He completed a degree in Sociology from the National University of San Marcos, Lima, Peru; Master's in Social Sciences from the Latin American Faculty of Social Sciences (FLACSO) in Chile and a doctorate in Sociology from the Faculty of Political and Social Sciences of the National Autonomous University of Mexico, Mexico.

He served as a full-time professor and researcher, "C" holder of the Faculty of Social Sciences of the Autonomous University of Sinaloa, (UAS), Mexico; member of the Sistema Nacional de Investigadores. He was the leader of the Academic Body CA-156 "Society and Culture" and a member of the Core of the Master in Social Sciences. He was also a PROMEP-SEP Researcher-Evaluator.

== Works ==
- Introducción al estudio del conocimiento científico, Plaza y Valdés Editores, ISBN 978-97-072-2377-6
- El punto de partida del método científicamente correcto, Plaza y Valdés Editores, ISBN 978-60-740-2085-4
- El arte y la ciencia de enseñar, Plaza y Valdés Editores, ISBN 978-60-740-2323-7
