= Jorge Sanjinez Lenz =

Peruvian military soldier (1917–2020)

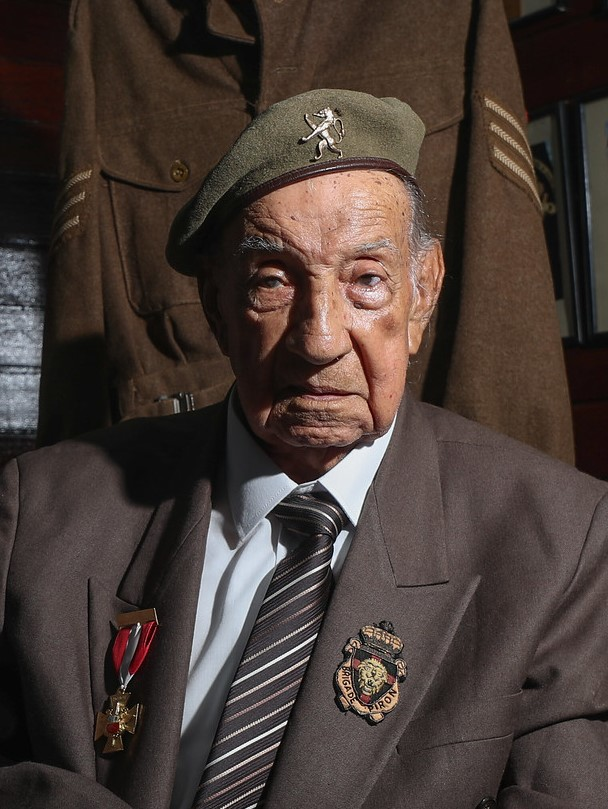
- Sanjinez in 2019. Official photo of the Ministry of Defense of Peru.
- Born: January 24, 1917; Moquegua, Moquegua, Peru
- Died: August 24, 2020 (aged 103); Pucallpa, Ucayali, Peru
- Burial place: Pucallpa, Peru
- Military career
- Allegiance: Belgium
- Rank: Sergeant
- Unit: Independent Belgian Brigade
- Conflicts: Second World War
- Awards: Legion of Honour

Jorge Sanjinez Lenz (January 24, 1917 – August 24, 2020) was a Peruvian veteran who participated as a military volunteer in World War II, on the side of the Allies for the liberation of Europe from the Axis powers. He enlisted in the Piron Brigade in the Free Belgian forces.

== Early years ==
He was born on January 24, 1917, in Moquegua, Peru. His childhood passed through periods in his country and in Bolivia.

== Second World War ==
In December 1942, in the midst of the Second World War, Sanjinez attended the Belgian embassy in Lima to enroll in the rebel camp that the government of the European country was promoting, along with other governments in exile, to end the Nazi occupation. The then President of Peru, Manuel Prado Ugarteche, accepted his decision and authorised Sanjinez.

He left on a Chilean ship, from Port of Callao, bound for New Orleans (through Panama), and from there to New York, and then to Canada, where he started his military training at No.42 Canadian Army Educational (Basic) Training Centre - Joliette, in Quebec. Months later, Sanjinez was relocated to the South of England, where further training was provided, in preparation to what would be the largest amphibious invasion in the history of warfare.

His participation began in August 1944, in the Battle of Normandy, then in the Dutch campaigns. Sanjinez said that during his stay on the Western Front he knew death directly:

We saw the explosion and little by little we got closer to the place. We could only find the trunk of the sergeant. He had lost his hands and legs and was dead. The driver was lying several meters away, unconscious. We were seconds away from being in the jeep, but we were saved.

Sanjinez also had an active and recognized participation with the Piron Brigade in the campaigns towards the liberation of France (Cabourg, August 21, Deauville, August 22 and Honfleur, August 24), Belgium (Brussels, September 3) and Netherlands.

== Post-war ==
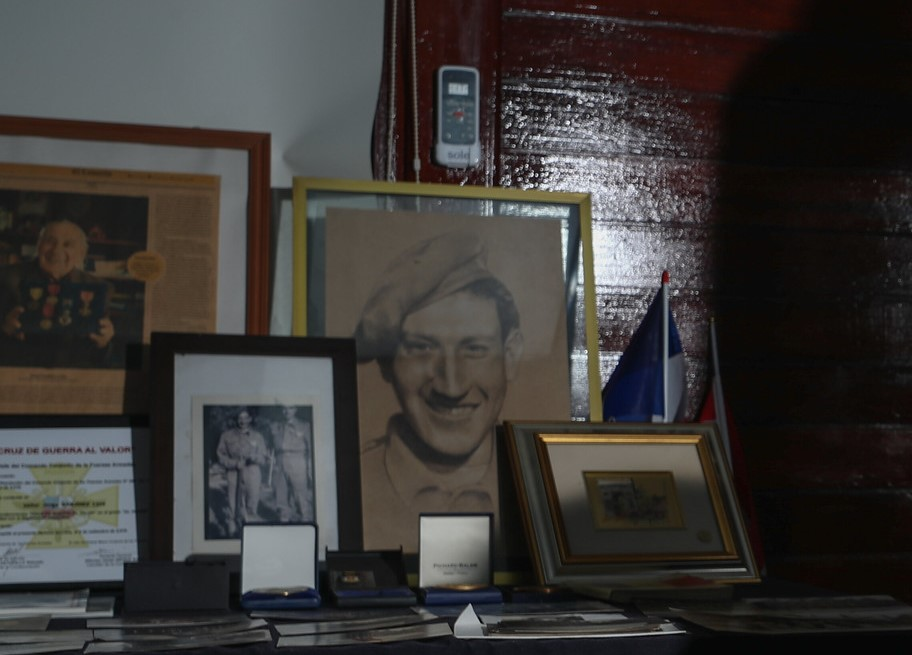
Personal belongings of Sanjinez Lenz at his home in Pucallpa (2019).

In 1946 he returned to Peru after finishing his volunteering in 1945. He worked for the airline company Faucett, from the late 1940s till 1980s. He had 6 children, 9 grandchildren and 2 great-grandchildren.

== Death ==
Sanjinez died on 24 August 2020 at his home in Pucallpa at 103 years of age due to kidney failure, an ailment that had afflicted him for some time. He was the last Latin American soldier to die who fought in the Liberation of France.

== Awards ==
He received several recognitions and medals for his participation. The most important is the medal of the Legion of Honor in knighthood by France, awarded in 2017 by the French embassy.
