= Sandro Mariátegui Chiappe =

Peruvian politician

Sandro Mariátegui Chiappe (December 9, 1921 – September 28, 2013) was a Peruvian politician. He was Minister of Economy and Finance from 1965 to 1967. He served as the President of the Senate from July 1982 to July 1983. Mariátegui was the prime minister of Peru from 10 April until 12 October 1984. He was the son of José Carlos Mariátegui. He died on 28 September 2013, aged 91.

== Biography ==
Son of José Carlos Mariátegui and Anna Chiappe; was born in Rome, Italy. Together with his family he moved to Lima in 1923. He finished his secondary education at the Colegio Superior directed by Professor Carlos A. Velásquez. His higher studies were taken at the Pontifical Catholic University of Peru, from where he graduated as a lawyer.

He assumed the direction of the Minerva - Miraflores Bookstore and Printing House, which his father founded in 1925. He was part of the National Front of Democratic Youth, which nominated the presidential candidacy of the architect Fernando Belaúnde Terry in 1956, whose registration was admitted by the National Jury of Elections after an epic civic day known as “El Manguerazo”. Belaúnde did not triumph then, being surpassed by Manuel Prado Ugarteche, but based on the Youth Front, the Popular Action party was immediately constituted, on July 7, 1956, which would triumph in the following general elections.

As a candidate for Popular Action, Sandro was elected deputy for Lima in 1962, performing his legislative function from 1963 to 1968. During the first Belaúnde government he was Minister of Finance and Commerce (from September 8, 1967 to January 29, 1968) . After the coup d'état of October 3, 1968, perpetrated by General Juan Velasco Alvarado, he suffered persecution, like the rest of the leading men of the Belaundista government. He was arrested and walked in shackles through the center of Lima.

After the announced return to democracy, he ran for Senate of the Republic in the general elections of 1980, in which his party led by Belaúnde again triumphed. He was president of the Senate in 1982. During this second Belaundista government he was appointed Minister of Foreign Affairs and President of the Council of Ministers, from April 10 to October 12, 1984. He had to face the problem of rampant inflation and the economic crisis, as well as the terrorist actions of the Shining Path.

He was reelected senator in 1985 and 1990. He supported his party's participation in the FREDEMO electoral alliance, which nominated writer Mario Vargas Llosa for president. His term as senator ended abruptly after Alberto Fujimori's self-coup on April 5, 1992. Since then, he has retired from public life and has been devoted to editorial work.

Political offices
Preceded by Fernando Schwalb López Aldana	Prime Minister of Peru; 1984	Succeeded by Luis Ciro Pércovich Roca
