= 2019 Abancay landslide =

Landslide in Abancay, Peru

A landslide on 27 January 2019 in Abancay, Peru, killed at least 15 people and injured 34 more when it destroyed part of a hotel during a wedding celebration. The celebration at the Alhambra Hotel was attended by 100 people at the time of the landslide, which caused the building to collapse. The landslide was triggered by heavy rains from earlier in the day.
