= José Hugo Garaycoa Hawkins =

Peruvian Roman Catholic bishop (1930–2018)

- Bishop of Tacna and Moquegua
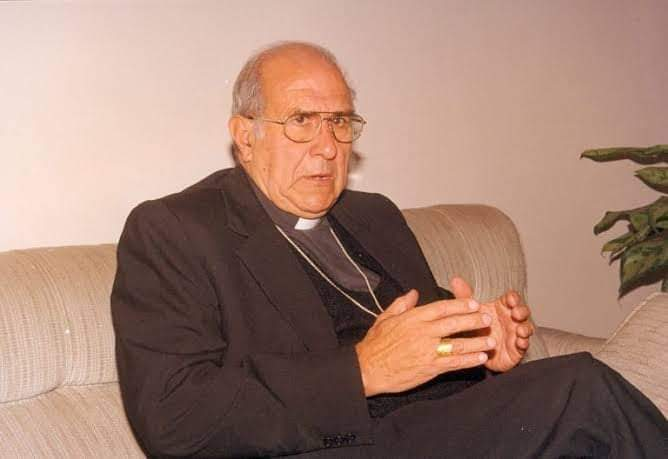
- Church: Catholic Church
- Diocese: Diocese of Tacna and Moquegua
- In office: 6 June 1991 – 1 September 2006
- Predecessor: Óscar Alzamora Revoredo
- Successor: Marco Antonio Cortez
- Previous posts: Titular Bishop of Horaea (1982-1991); Auxiliary Bishop of Lima (1982-1991)

Orders
- Ordination: 9 July 1961
- Consecration: 25 January 1983 by Juan Landázuri Ricketts

Personal details
- Born: 2 June 1930 Callao, Department of Lima, Peru
- Died: 27 March 2018 (aged 87) Lima, Peru

José Hugo Garaycoa Hawkins (2 June 1930 – 27 March 2018) was a Roman Catholic bishop.

Garaycoa Hawkins was born in Peru and was ordained to the priesthood in 1961. He served as titular bishop of Horæa and auxiliary bishop of the Roman Catholic Archdiocese of Lima, Peru, from 1982 to 1991. He then served as Bishop of the Roman Catholic Diocese of Tacna y Moquegua, Peru, from 1991 to 2006.
