= Miguel Gutiérrez (writer) =

Peruvian writer (1940–2016)

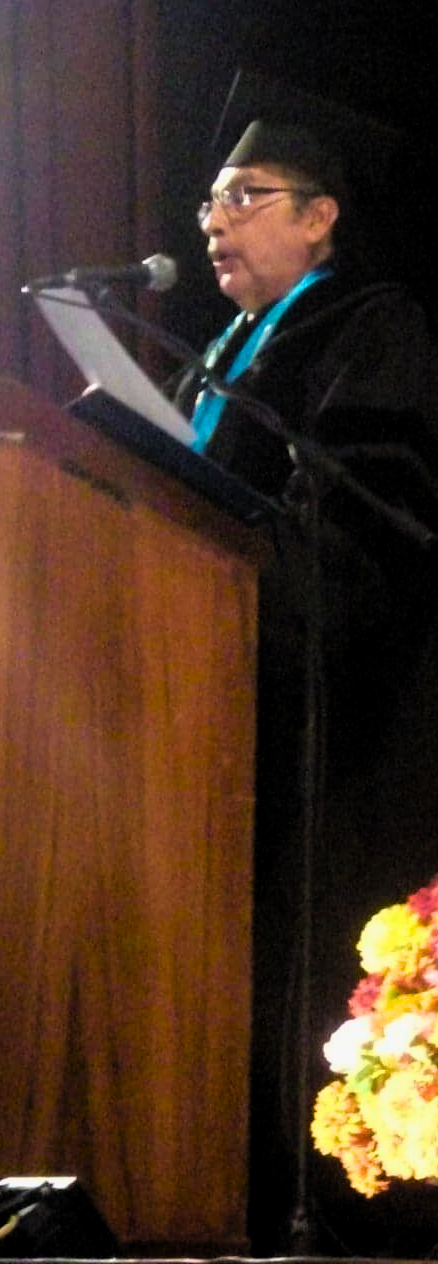

Miguel Francisco Gutiérrez Correa (27 July 1940 – 14 July 2016) was a Peruvian writer.

His works on the theme of disaffected youth include El viejo saurio se retira (The Ancient Lizard Retires; 1969) and La violencia del tiempo (The Violence of Time; 1991).

== Works ==
- El viejo saurio se retira (1969)
- Hombres de caminos (1988)
- La violencia del tiempo (1991)
- La destrucción del reino (1992)
- Babel, el paraíso (1993)
- Poderes secretos (1995)
- El mundo sin Xóchitl (2001)
- Cinco historias de mujeres y otra sobre Tamara Fiol (2006)
- Confesiones de Tamara Fiol (2009)
- Una pasión Latina (2011)
