= Santiago Manuin Valera =

Peruvian Awajún activist (1957–2020)

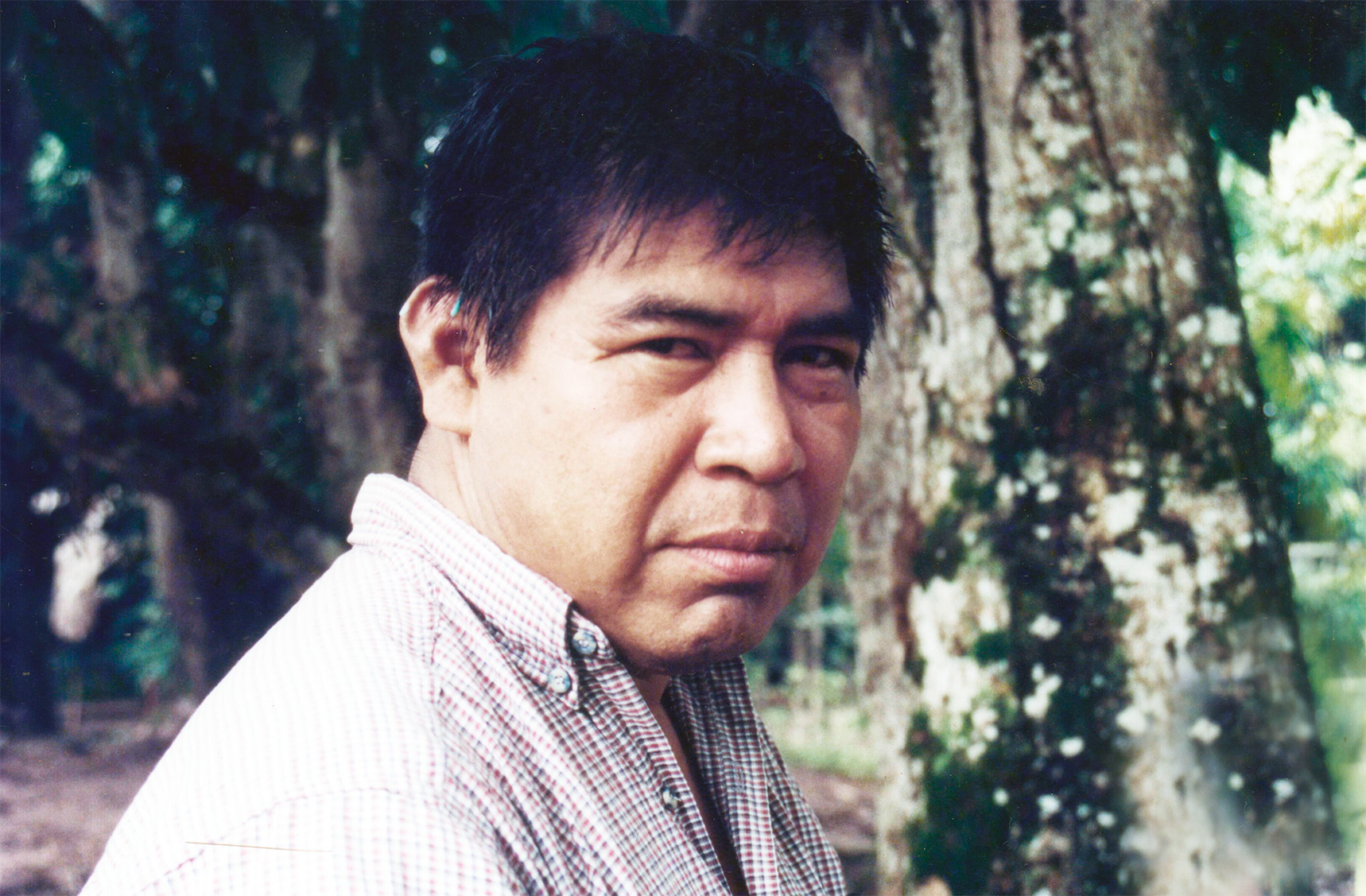
Santiago Manuin in 2009.

Santiago Manuin Valera (1 January 1957 – 1 July 2020) was a Peruvian human rights activist and indigenous leader.

== Biography ==
He was born in Condorcanqui Province, Peru. He was a key leader of the Aguaruna people in Peru. He was President of the Committee for the Struggle for Respect for Indigenous Peoples of Condorcanqui.

He was a critic of the Túpac Amaru Revolutionary Movement. During a police crackdown on dissenters in 2009, he was shot, but survived the encounter. He and other activists were blocking a road to protest the destruction of the Amazon rainforest. Several dozen people were killed during the conflict with the police.

Manuin Valera died on 1 July 2020, from COVID-19 during the COVID-19 pandemic in Peru in Chiclayo, Peru, at the age of 63.
