= Alberto Flores Galindo =

Peruvian historian, social scientist and essay writer

Alberto Flores Galindo (May 28, 1949, in Bellavista, Callao – March 26, 1990, in Lima) was a Peruvian historian, social scientist, and essay writer. He was the founder of the socialist Centro de Investigacion Casa SUR.

== Biography ==
Alberto Flores Galindo was born in Lima to a middle-class family. He spent his school years studying in the Lima private religious school Colegio La Salle. Later, he studied history at the Pontificia Universidad Catolica del Peru. At age 22 he had already concluded his thesis on miners from Cerro de Pasco, which was graded as "outstanding." This thesis was later published by the university in the form of a book.

As a result of his studies, he obtained a scholarship from the École des hautes études en sciences sociales of Paris. Upon returning to Peru he dedicated his time to university research at the Universidad Católica, and also spent time as a reporter for newspapers and magazines. During the 1980s he founded SUR, the Casa de Estudios del Socialismo (House of Socialist Studies), and made it both an editorial house and a center of intellectual discussions. Moreover, he also founded the magazine Margenes and published it through SUR.

He was a prolific historian and one of the most influent Peruvian leftist intellectuals of the 1980s. Flores Galindo constantly promoted various debates about Marxism through intellectual thought (La Agonia de Mariategui, 1980) and social history (Aristocracia y Plebe, 1984). In this last book he was inspired by the works of E.P. Thompson, an English Marxist historian. With this influence, he was able to analyze and understand Peruvian colonial society in terms of class, understanding class -much like Thompson- not as a thing in itself but as a set of relationships. Other major influences in his works came from Frantz Fanon, the French historians from the Annales School, and the Peruvians Jose Carlos Mariategui, Jose Maria Arguedas, and Jorge Basadre.

The collection of essays entitled Buscando un Inca: Indentidad y Utopia en los Andes (Searching for an Inca: Identity and Utopia in the Andes), originally published in 1986, obtained the Premio Ensayo de Casa de las Americas in Cuba. With the book, Flores Galindo sought to formulate a link between socialist thought and Andean traditions. He was the first historian to write about racism in Peru through the 1988 version of Buscando un Inca in the chapter entitled República sin Ciudadanos (Republic without Citizens).

== Works ==
- Los Mineros de la Cerro de Pasco (1974) (The Miners from Cerro de Pasco)
- La Agonia de Mariategui. La polemica con la Komintern (1980) (Mariategui's Agony: Problems with the Comintern)
- Apogeo y Crisis de la República Aristocrática (with Manuel Burga)
- Aristocracia y Plebe. Lima, 1760-1830. Estructura de Clases y Sociedad Colonial (1984)
- Buscando un Inca: Identidad y utopía en los Andes (1986, 1988); Searching for an Inca: Identity and Utopia in the Andes
- La Tradición Autoritaria (posthumously published) (The Authoritarian Tradition)
