= Gian Carlo Vacchelli =

Peruvian sports commentator and politician (1981-2020)

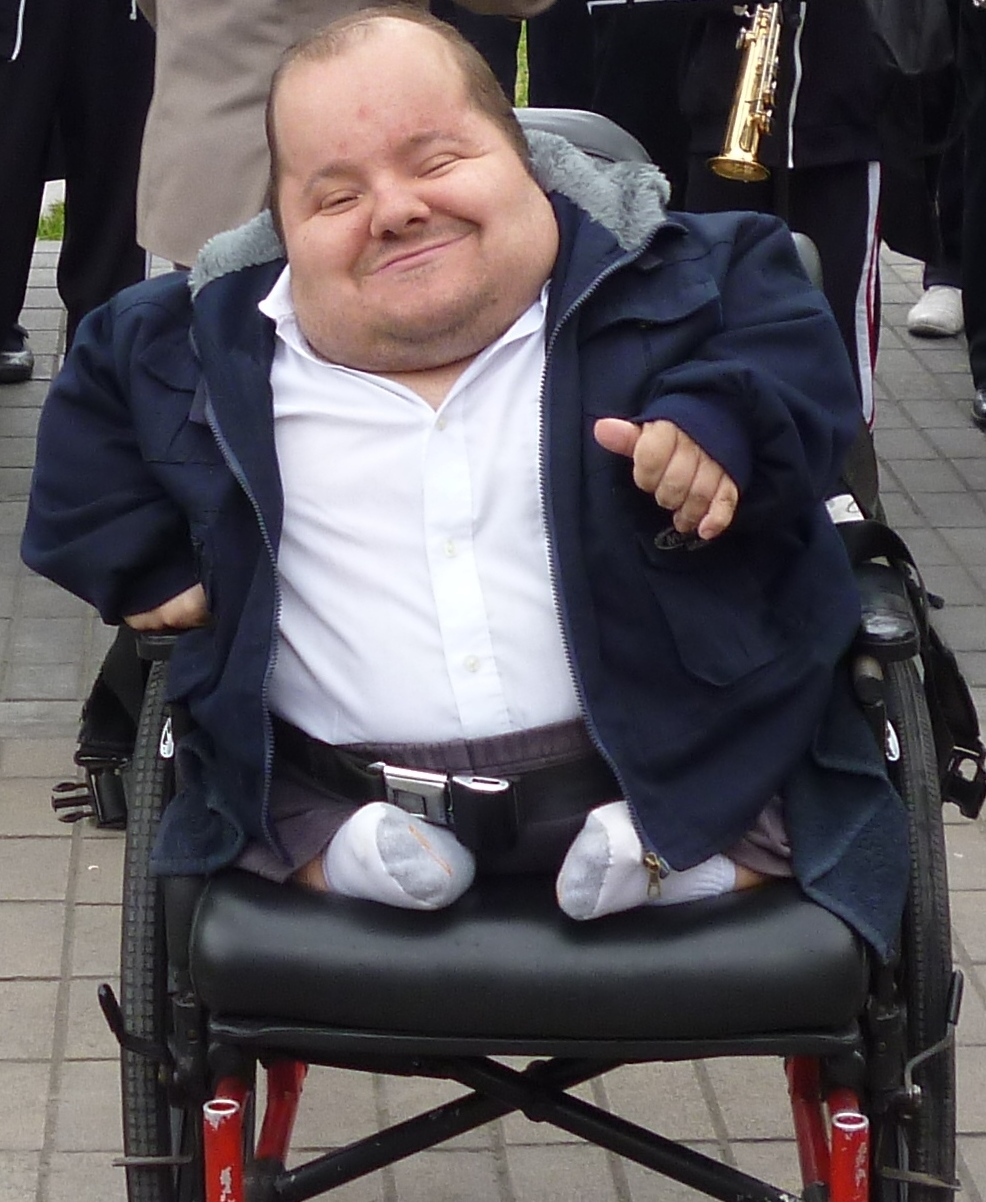
- Vacchelli in 2012

Member of Congress
- In office 26 July 2011 – 26 July 2016
- Constituency: Lima

Personal details
- Born: Gian Carlo Vacchelli Corbetto; 16 December 1981
- Died: 12 August 2020 (aged 38)
- Party: Popular Force
- Spouse: Evelyn Osorio (2015–2020, his death)
- Occupation: Sports commentator, politician

Gian Carlo Vacchelli Corbetto (16 December 1981 – 12 August 2020) was a Peruvian sports commentator and Fujimorist politician. Nicknamed El Angelito, meaning "the little angel", he presented the sports program El ángel del deporte (2008–09) on RBC Televisión. Between 2011 and 2016, Vacchelli was a member of the Fujimorist Force 2011 and was Congressman for the district of Lima elected in the 2011 elections. He stood for re-election in the 2016 election, but lost his seat. During his time in Congress, he presented various bills in favour of sports and people with disabilities, of which 49 were approved.

== Personal life ==
Vacchelli had osteogenesis imperfecta and used a wheelchair for mobility. He married Evelyn Osorio in May 2015. He had a little brother named "Upa". He died on 12 August 2020 at the age of 38.
