= Peru–European Union relations =

- European Union: Peru

Diplomatic mission
- Delegation of the EU to Peru: Embassy of Peru, Brussels

Peru–European Union relations refers to the bilateral relations between the European Union and Peru. The Delegation of the European Union in Peru is based in the city of Lima and also serves as the link for the Andean Community.

== History ==
Since March 1991, the Representation of the European Commission has been present in Peru.

Since March 15, 2016, Peruvians in the Schengen area have been exempted from needing a travel visa.

In 2021, the High Representative of the European Union, Josep Borrell, made an official visit to Peru.

== High-level visits ==
High-level visit from the EU to Peru

- High Representative Josep Borrell (2021)

High-level visit from Peru to the EU

- President Ollanta Humala (2016)

== Trade ==
The European Union represents 11% of Peru's total merchandise trade, making it the third largest trading partner. Likewise, Peru is the 49th trading partner of the EU with 0.2% of the total trade in goods in the EU.

The EU has sought a Free Trade Agreement with the Andean Community and especially with Peru, as Spain is the world's leading investor in the Andean country.

The Free Trade Agreement between Peru and the European Union entered into negotiations between February 9 and 13, 2009. On May 18, 2010, the conclusion of the Free Trade Agreement negotiations with the European Union was formally announced. On June 26, 2012, the treaty was signed with Colombia in Brussels, Belgium. It entered into force in Peru on March 1, 2013. Ecuador joined the trade agreement in 2016.

== Diplomatic missions ==
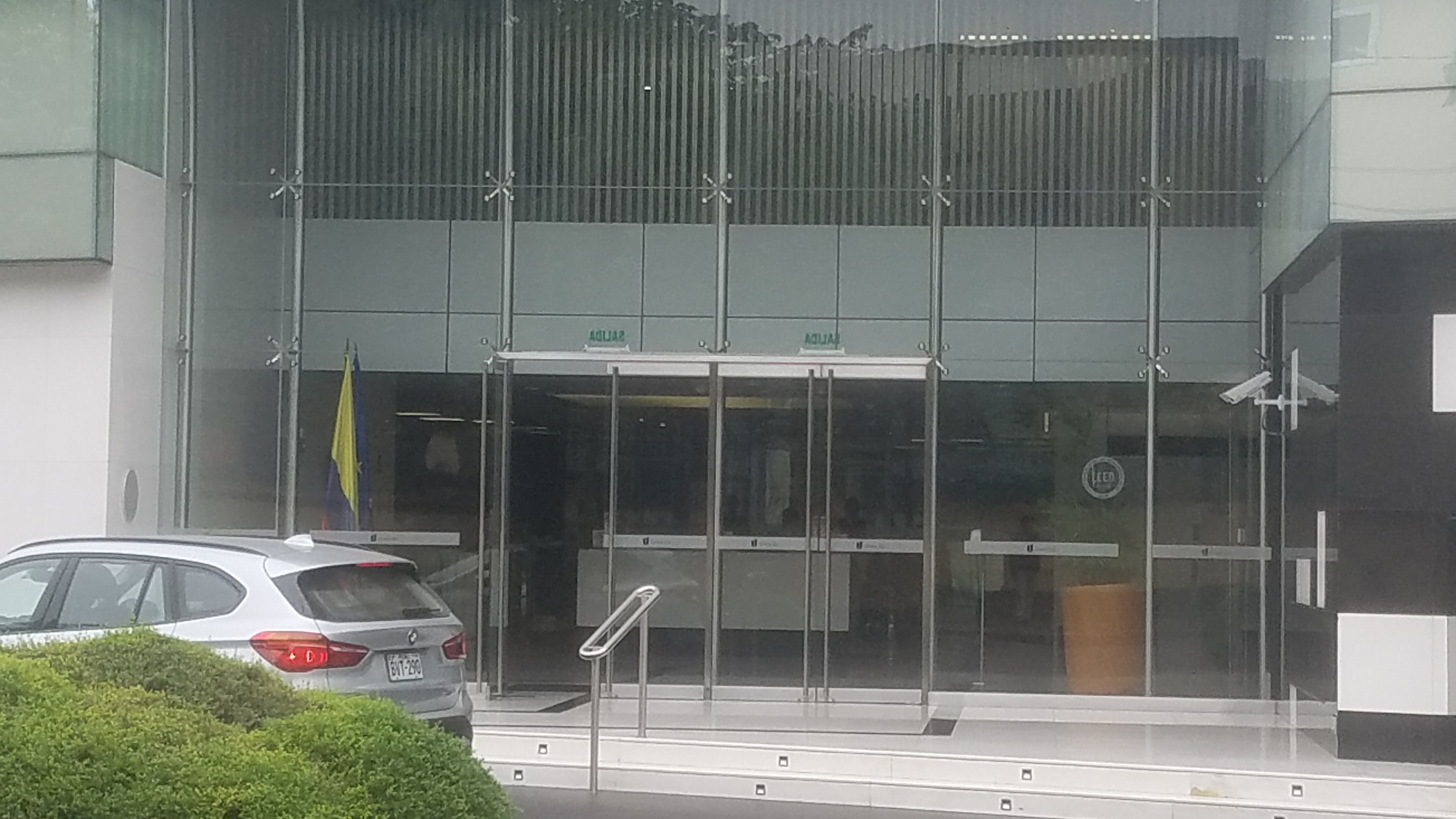
The EU delegation and Colombian embassy in San Isidro.

- The European Union has a delegation in Lima.
- Peru has an embassy in Brussels accredited to the EU.

== Peru's foreign relations with EU member states ==
- Austria
- Belgium
- Bulgaria
- Croatia
- Cyprus
- Czech Republic
- Denmark
- Estonia
- Finland
- France
- Germany
- Greece
- Hungary
- (Republic of Ireland) Ireland
- Italy
- Latvia
- Lithuania
- Luxembourg
- Malta
- Netherlands
- Poland
- Portugal
- Romania
- Slovakia
- Slovenia
- Spain
- Sweden

== See also ==
- Foreign relations of the European Union
- Foreign relations of Peru
- List of ambassadors of the European Union to Peru
- List of ambassadors of Peru to the European Union
- Peru–Spain relations
