= List of diplomatic missions in Peru =

This is a list of diplomatic missions in Peru. There are currently 58 embassies in Lima, and many countries maintain consulates in other Peruvian cities (not including honorary consulates).

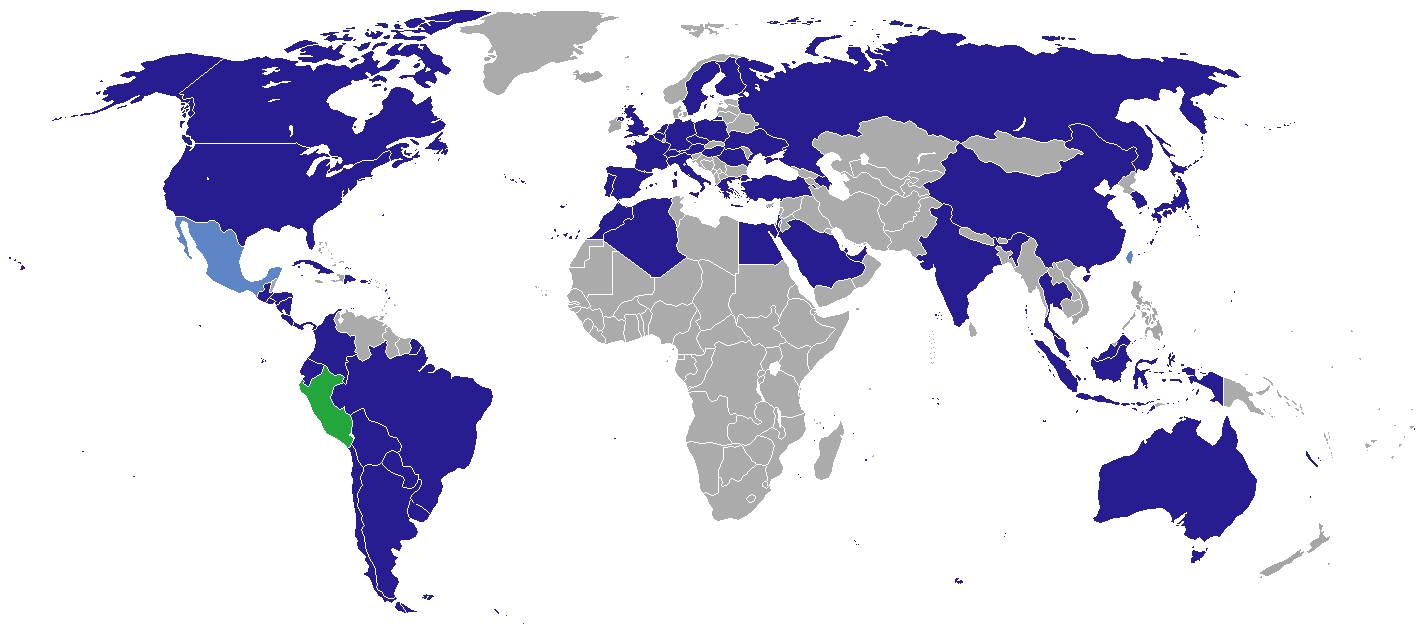
Diplomatic missions in Peru Peru Countries with embassies in Lima

== Diplomatic missions in Lima ==
=== Embassies ===
Delegation	Mission type	Year established	District	Photo	Mission website
Algeria	Embassy	1975	San Isidro		
Argentina	Embassy	1822	San Isidro		
Australia	Embassy	1963	Miraflores		
Austria	Embassy	1900	San Isidro		
Azerbaijan (Note: Subordinate to the Azerbaijani Embassy in Mexico City, Mexico.)	Embassy office	2013	Miraflores		
Belgium	Embassy	1910	Miraflores		
Bolivia	Embassy	1826	San Isidro		
Brazil	Embassy	1826	Miraflores		
Canada	Embassy	1944	Miraflores		
Chile	Embassy	1909	San Isidro		
China	Embassy	1972	San Isidro		
Colombia	Embassy	1826	San Isidro		
Costa Rica	Embassy	1960	San Isidro		
Cuba	Embassy	1955	San Isidro		
Czech Republic	Embassy	1933	San Isidro		
Dominican Republic	Embassy		San Isidro		
Ecuador	Embassy	1846	San Isidro		
Egypt	Embassy	1963	San Isidro		-
El Salvador	Embassy		San Isidro		-
Finland	Embassy	1983	San Isidro		
France	Embassy	1826	San Isidro		
Germany	Embassy	1828	San Isidro		
Greece	Embassy	1965	San Isidro		
Guatemala	Embassy	1960	Jesús María		
Holy See	Apostolic Nunciature	1859	Jesús María		
Honduras	Embassy	1960	San Isidro		-
Hungary	Embassy	2017	San Isidro		
India	Embassy	1980	San Isidro		
Indonesia	Embassy	1975	San Isidro		
Israel	Embassy	1957	San Isidro		-
Italy	Embassy	1827	Jesús María		
Japan	Embassy	1899	Magdalena del Mar		
Malaysia	Embassy	1996	San Isidro		
Mexico	Embassy	1823	San Isidro		
Morocco	Embassy	1970	San Isidro		
Netherlands	Embassy	1970	Miraflores		(Note: Also represents Luxembourg.)
Nicaragua	Embassy		San Isidro		
Palestine	Embassy	1960	San Isidro		
Panama	Embassy	1950	San Isidro		
Paraguay	Embassy	1827	San Isidro		
Poland	Embassy	1910	Jesús María		
Portugal	Embassy	1890	San Isidro		
Qatar	Embassy	2011	Miraflores		
Romania	Embassy	1947	San Isidro		
Russia	Embassy	1969	San Isidro		-
Saudi Arabia	Embassy	2011	San Isidro		-
South Korea	Embassy	1960	San Isidro		
Sovereign Military Order of Malta	Embassy		San Isidro	|	
Spain	Embassy	1860	San Isidro		
Sweden	Embassy	1975	San Isidro		
Switzerland	Embassy	1957	San Isidro		
Thailand	Embassy	2006	San Isidro		
Turkey	Embassy	2009	San Isidro		
Ukraine	Embassy	2003	San Isidro		
United Arab Emirates	Embassy	2016	Miraflores		
United Kingdom	Embassy	1823	Miraflores		
United States	Embassy	1920	Santiago de Surco		
Uruguay	Embassy		San Isidro		

=== Other missions or delegations ===
1. European Union (Delegation)
2. International Committee of the Red Cross (Delegation)
3. Organization of American States (Representative office)
4. Taiwan (Representative office)
5. United Nations (Resident coordinator's office)

== Consular missions ==
=== Arequipa ===
- Chile (Consulate-General)

=== Cusco ===
- Bolivia (Consulate)
- United States (Consular Agency)

=== Ilo ===
- Bolivia (Consulate)

=== Iquitos ===
- Brazil (Vice-Consulate)
- Colombia (Consulate)
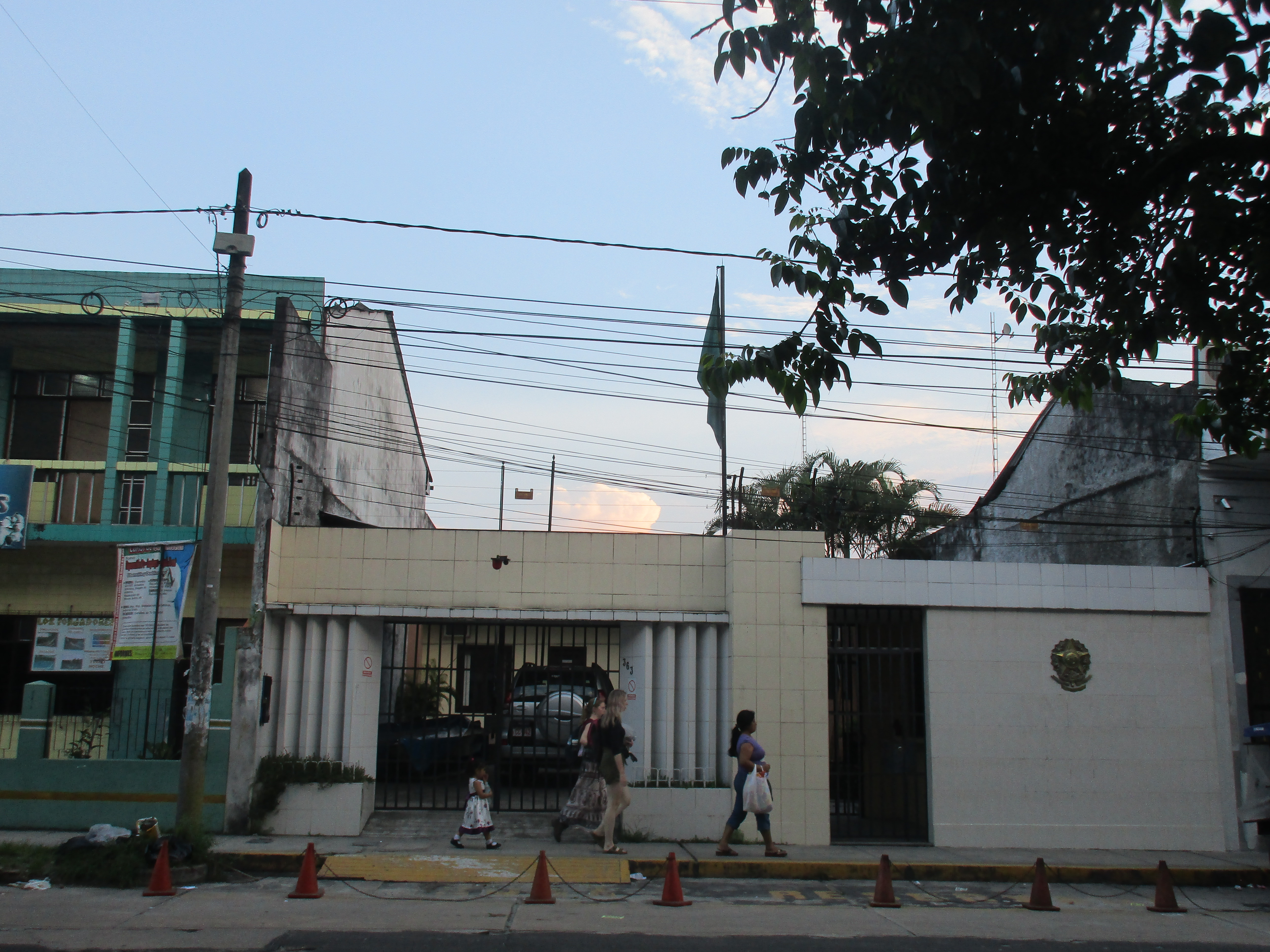
Vice-Consulate of Brazil

=== Puno ===
- Bolivia (Consulate)

=== Tacna ===
- Bolivia (Consulate)
- Chile (Consulate-General)

=== Tumbes ===
- Ecuador (Consulate-General)

== Non-resident embassies accredited to Peru ==
=== Resident in Brasília, Brazil ===
1. Albania
2. Angola
3. Bulgaria
4. Burkina Faso
5. Cambodia
6. Cameroon
7. Congo-Brazzaville
8. Equatorial Guinea
9. Georgia
10. Ghana
11. Guinea
12. Ivory Coast
13. Jordan
14. Kenya
15. Kuwait
16. Libya
17. Mali
18. Mauritania
19. Namibia
20. Oman
21. Senegal
22. Sri Lanka
23. Sudan
24. Suriname
25. Tanzania
26. Vietnam
27. Zambia
28. Zimbabwe

=== Resident in Buenos Aires, Argentina ===
1. Armenia
2. Belarus
3. Cyprus
4. Nigeria
5. Pakistan
6. Serbia
7. Slovakia
8. Slovenia
9. Tunisia

=== Resident in Caracas, Venezuela ===
1. Barbados
2. Grenada
3. Guyana
4. Iraq
5. Trinidad and Tobago

=== Resident in Santiago de Chile, Chile ===
1. Croatia
2. Denmark
3. Haiti
4. Ireland
5. New Zealand
6. Norway
7. Philippines
8. South Africa
9. Syria

=== Resident in Washington, D.C., United States ===
1. Brunei
2. Saint Vincent and the Grenadines
3. Uganda

=== Resident elsewhere ===
1. Azerbaijan (Mexico City)
2. Bangladesh (New York City)
3. Estonia (Tallinn)
4. Fiji (Wellington)
5. Iceland (Madrid)
6. Lebanon (Bogotá)
7. Monaco (Paris)
8. Mongolia (Havana)
9. Nepal (New York City)
10. San Marino (Rome)
11. Singapore (Singapore)

=== Unconfirmed ===
- Afghanistan (Ottawa)
- Bahrain (Brasília)
- Belize (Mexico City)
- Cape Verde (Brasília)
- Central African Republic (Washington, D.C.)
- Gabon (Brasília)
- Iran (Quito)
- Laos (Havana)
- Latvia (Berlin)
- Maldives (New York City)
- Myanmar (Brasília)
- Sierra Leone (New York City)
- South Sudan (Washington, D.C.)
- Timor-Leste (Brasília)
- Turkmenistan (Washington, D.C.)

== Closed missions ==
Host city	Sending country	Mission	Year closed	Ref.
Lima	Bulgaria	Embassy	1998	
Lima	China (Taiwan)	Embassy	1971	
Lima	Denmark	Embassy	Unknown	
Lima	East Germany	Embassy	1990	
Lima	Haiti	Embassy	1991	
Lima	Namibia	Representative office	Unknown	
Lima	New Zealand	Embassy	1990	
Lima	North Korea	Embassy	2018	
Lima	Philippines	Embassy	1993	
Lima	Sahrawi Republic	Embassy	2023	
Lima	Serbia	Embassy	2009	
Lima	Slovakia	Embassy	2003	
Lima	South Africa	Embassy	2021	
Lima	Venezuela	Embassy	2024	
Callao	Chile	Consulate-General	Unknown	
Arequipa	Panama	Consulate	1993	
Piura	Ecuador	Consulate	2013	

== Missions to open ==
Host city	Sending country	Mission	Ref.
Lima	Croatia	Embassy	
Lima	Philippines	Embassy	
Cusco	Brazil	Vice-Consulate	

== See also ==
- Foreign relations of Peru
- List of diplomatic missions of Peru
