= Foreign relations of Peru =

The foreign relations of Peru are managed by the Ministry of Foreign Affairs. As an important first-tier state in South America, Peru has been a member of the United Nations since 1945, and Peruvian Javier Pérez de Cuéllar served as UN Secretary General from 1981 to 1991. Former President Alberto Fujimori's tainted re-election to a third term in June 2000 strained Peru's relations with the United States and with many Latin American and European countries, but relations improved with the installation of an interim government in November 2000 and the inauguration of Alejandro Toledo in July 2001.

Peru is planning full integration into the Andean Free Trade Area. In addition, Peru is a standing member of APEC and the World Trade Organization, and is an active participant in negotiations toward a Free Trade Area of the Americas (FTAA).

== Diplomatic relations ==
List of countries which Peru maintains diplomatic relations with:

#	Country	Date
1	Colombia	6 July 1822
2	Argentina	10 July 1822
3	Chile	8 October 1822
4	Mexico	23 January 1823
5	United Kingdom	10 October 1823
6	Netherlands	18 July 1825
7	Bolivia	24 June 1826
8	Brazil	3 February 1827
9	United States	21 May 1827
10	Ecuador	26 September 1831
—	Venezuela (suspended)	23 December 1833
11	Belgium	16 May 1850
12	Costa Rica	28 April 1851
13	Portugal	26 March 1853
14	Honduras	22 January 1857
15	Guatemala	20 April 1857
16	El Salvador	10 July 1857
17	Nicaragua	5 October 1857
18	France	9 March 1861
19	Uruguay	16 May 1862
20	Paraguay	25 June 1862
21	Italy	25 February 1864
22	Japan	21 August 1873
23	Dominican Republic	6 April 1874
—	Holy See	10 October 1877
24	Spain	15 November 1879
25	Switzerland	7 March 1893
26	Panama	18 December 1903
27	Cuba	11 January 1905
28	Denmark	22 July 1921
29	Czech Republic	11 July 1922
30	Austria	17 July 1923
31	Norway	3 August 1923
32	Poland	6 September 1923
33	Haiti	10 October 1929
34	Sweden	1 January 1931
35	Romania	10 October 1939
36	Canada	30 January 1944
37	Lebanon	1949
38	Turkey	21 September 1950
39	Germany	28 June 1951
—	Sovereign Military Order of Malta	15 April 1953
40	Israel	6 November 1956
41	Luxembourg	14 June 1962
42	Australia	1 March 1963
43	India	25 March 1963
44	Finland	29 March 1963
45	South Korea	1 April 1963
46	Egypt	7 October 1963
47	Morocco	18 June 1964
48	Ivory Coast	18 August 1964
49	Thailand	10 November 1965
50	Niger	November 1965
51	Greece	3 December 1965
52	Burkina Faso	March 1966
53	Cyprus	12 September 1966
54	Tunisia	30 May 1967
55	Ethiopia	10 September 1967
56	Iceland	14 November 1967
57	Trinidad and Tobago	5 February 1968
58	Barbados	29 February 1968
59	Russia	1 February 1969
60	Hungary	16 April 1969
61	Bulgaria	18 April 1969
62	Serbia	12 December 1969
63	Jamaica	29 April 1970
64	Zambia	5 October 1970
65	Nigeria	5 July 1971
66	Guyana	17 July 1971
67	China	2 November 1971
68	Albania	6 December 1971
69	Algeria	10 March 1972
70	New Zealand	4 July 1972
—	Iran (suspended)	20 November 1973
71	Libya	28 April 1974
72	Pakistan	1 September 1974
73	Philippines	30 November 1974
74	Guinea	8 January 1975
75	Sri Lanka	17 March 1975
76	Republic of the Congo	12 July 1975
77	Democratic Republic of the Congo	3 August 1975
78	Indonesia	12 August 1975
79	Tanzania	12 August 1975
80	Syria	16 August 1975
81	Iraq	11 October 1975
82	Kuwait	1 December 1975
83	Nepal	28 January 1976
84	Kenya	25 February 1976
85	Cambodia	31 May 1976
86	Malta	27 April 1977
87	Suriname	23 June 1978
88	Singapore	27 October 1980
89	Equatorial Guinea	28 April 1981
90	Bangladesh	February 1983
91	Grenada	16 March 1983
92	Papua New Guinea	14 September 1983
93	Kiribati	29 October 1983
94	Tonga	20 January 1984
95	Nauru	23 January 1984
96	Samoa	23 January 1984
97	Antigua and Barbuda	24 June 1985
98	Angola	6 September 1985
99	Jordan	21 October 1985
100	Bahamas	1985
101	Saint Lucia	1985
102	Mozambique	25 February 1986
103	Dominica	18 March 1986
104	Saudi Arabia	19 March 1986
105	Malaysia	24 April 1986
106	Zimbabwe	30 April 1986
107	Saint Vincent and the Grenadines	5 May 1986
108	Oman	14 May 1986
109	Vanuatu	30 May 1986
110	United Arab Emirates	17 June 1986
111	Guinea-Bissau	29 September 1986
112	Ghana	23 June 1987
113	Cape Verde	1 November 1988
114	North Korea	15 December 1988
115	Maldives	6 February 1989
116	Myanmar	17 April 1989
117	Laos	27 April 1989
118	São Tomé and Príncipe	4 May 1989
119	Sierra Leone	15 May 1989
120	Eswatini	8 June 1989
121	Lesotho	21 July 1989
122	Qatar	7 November 1989
123	Brunei	1 June 1990
124	Mauritania	19 June 1990
125	Namibia	11 July 1990
126	Marshall Islands	14 November 1991
127	Belize	27 November 1991
128	Seychelles	15 January 1992
129	Federated States of Micronesia	7 May 1992
130	Ukraine	7 May 1992
131	Armenia	9 September 1992
132	Slovenia	9 September 1992
133	Slovakia	1 January 1993
134	Croatia	12 January 1993
135	South Africa	28 July 1993
136	Vietnam	14 November 1994
137	Estonia	27 July 1995
138	Moldova	11 August 1995
139	Azerbaijan	25 June 1996
140	Liechtenstein	5 July 1996
141	Latvia	23 July 1996
142	Kazakhstan	6 February 1997
143	Belarus	19 February 1997
144	Turkmenistan	7 May 1997
145	Mongolia	30 May 1997
146	Andorra	3 June 1997
147	Lithuania	9 June 1997
148	Bosnia and Herzegovina	23 January 1998
149	Mali	16 July 1998
150	Ireland	27 June 1999
151	Kyrgyzstan	2 July 1999
152	Uzbekistan	22 December 1999
153	Tajikistan	21 January 2000
154	Timor-Leste	30 September 2002
155	North Macedonia	29 June 2005
156	San Marino	4 July 2005
157	Mauritius	12 December 2005
158	Montenegro	12 September 2006
159	Bahrain	22 September 2009
160	Georgia	14 January 2010
161	Cameroon	13 July 2010
162	Monaco	13 October 2010
—	State of Palestine	12 November 2010
163	Solomon Islands	14 March 2012
164	Tuvalu	29 March 2012
165	Fiji	11 June 2012
166	Afghanistan	27 September 2012
167	Sudan	22 July 2013
—	Cook Islands	September 2017
168	Benin	22 November 2017
169	Senegal	5 December 2017
170	Rwanda	7 December 2017
171	Togo	18 December 2017
172	Djibouti	28 February 2018
173	Palau	14 February 2019
—	Niue	13 July 2020
174	Uganda	4 June 2021
175	Saint Kitts and Nevis	24 April 2023
176	Gabon	3 August 2023
177	Malawi	Unknown

== Bilateral relations ==
=== Africa ===
Country	Formal Relations Began	Notes
Algeria	10 March 1972	Main article: Algeria–Peru relations: Algeria has an embassy in Lima.
Angola	6 September 1985	Angola is accredited to Peru from its embassy in Brasília.
Burkina Faso	March 1966	Burkina Faso is accredited to Peru from its embassy in Brasília.
Congo-Brazzaville	12 July 1975	The Republic of the Congo is accredited to Peru from its embassy in Brasília.
Egypt	7 October 1963	Main article: Egypt–Peru relations: Egypt has an embassy in Lima.
Ghana	23 June 1987	Main article: Ghana–Peru relations: Ghana is accredited to Peru from its embassy in Brasília, Brazil.
Kenya	25 February 1976	Peru formerly had an embassy from 1987 to 1990. The embassy in Nairobi was re-opened in 2023.
Libya	28 April 1974	Main article: Libya–Peru relations: Libya is accredited to Peru from its embassy in Brasília.
Morocco	18 June 1964	Main article: Morocco–Peru relations: Morocco has an embassy in Lima.
Namibia	11 July 1990	Main article: Namibia–Peru relations: Peru established relations with SWAPO, preceding Namibian independence.; Namibia is accredited to Peru from its embassy in Brasília.
Nigeria	5 July 1971	Both countries established diplomatic relations on 5 July 1971: Nigeria is accredited to Peru from its embassy in Buenos Aires.
Sahrawi Arab Democratic Republic	—	Main article: Peru–Sahrawi Arab Democratic Republic relations: The SADR has an embassy in Lima.; Peru established formal relations with the SADR on 5 May 1987, under Alan García, but recognition existed since 16 August 1984. Said relations expired on 9 September 1996, with Peru taking a neutral part in the Western Sahara conflict.; On September 8, 2021, Peru and the SADR re-established their bilateral relations, but the former again severed them on August 16, 2022, renovating them one month later.
South Africa	28 July 1993	Main article: Peru–South Africa relations: Peru has an embassy in Pretoria. A Consulate was also maintained in Cape Town which closed in 1985.; South Africa is accredited to Peru from its embassy in Santiago.
Sudan	October 7, 1988	Sudan is accredited to Peru from its embassy in Brasília.
Tanzania	12 August 1975	Tanzania is accredited to Peru from its embassy in Brasília.
Tunisia	September 1966	Tunisia is accredited to Peru from its embassy in Buenos Aires.
Zambia	5 October 1970	Both countries established diplomatic relations on 5 October 1970: Peru is accredited to Zambia from its embassy in Pretoria. It previously maintained an embassy in Lusaka until 1990.; Zambia is accredited to Peru from its embassy in Brasília.
Zimbabwe	March 1986	Peru is accredited to Zimbabwe from its embassy in Pretoria. It previously maintained an embassy in Harare until 1990.; Zimbabwe is accredited to Peru from its embassy in Brasília.

=== Americas ===
Country	Formal Relations Began	Notes
Argentina	10 July 1822	Main article: Argentina–Peru relations: Argentina has an embassy in Lima.; Peru has an embassy in Buenos Aires and consulates-general in Córdoba, La Plata and Mendoza.; Both countries are full members of the Association of Spanish Language Academies, Organization of American States, Organization of Ibero-American States, Rio Group, and the Union of South American Nations.
Bolivia	24 June 1826	Both countries established diplomatic relations on 24 June 1826 Main article: Bolivia–Peru relations: Bolivia has an embassy in Lima.; Peru has an embassy in La Paz.
Brazil	3 February 1827	Both countries established diplomatic relations on 3 February 1827. Main article: Brazil–Peru relations: Brazil has an embassy in Lima.; Peru has an embassy in Brasília.; Both countries are full members of the Community of Latin American and Caribbean States (CELAC), the Latin American Integration Association (ALADI), the Organization of American States (OAS), and the Union of South American Nations (UNASUR).
Canada	30 January 1944	Both countries established diplomatic relations on 30 January 1944 Main article: Canada–Peru relations: Canada has an embassy in Lima.; Peru has an embassy in Ottawa and 3 consulates-general (in Montreal, Toronto and Vancouver).; Both countries are full members of the Asia-Pacific Economic Cooperation, of the Cairns Group and of the Organization of American States.; The Canadian government announced in February 2009 that it was adding Peru to its list of preferred countries to receive foreign aid. This list includes 18 countries and the West Bank and Caribbean.
Chile	8 October 1822	Both countries established diplomatic relations on 8 October 1822 Main article: Chile–Peru relations In November 1999, Peru and Chile signed three agreements which put to rest the remaining obstacles holding up implementation of the 1929 Treaty of Lima, which officially ended the 1879 War of the Pacific. In December 1999, President Alberto Fujimori made the first visit ever to Chile by a Peruvian head of state. Relations between the two nations have since mostly recovered. In 2005, the Peruvian Congress unilaterally approved a law which increased the stated sea limit with Chile. This law superseded the Peruvian supreme decree 781 for same purpose from 1947, which had autolimited its maritime border to geographical parallels only. Peru's position was that the border has never been fully demarcated, but Chile disagreed reminding on treaties in 1952 and 1954 between the countries, which supposedly defined seaborder. The border problem has still not been solved. However, Chile's Michelle Bachelet and Peru's Alan García have established a positive diplomatic relationship, and it is very unlikely any hostilities will break out because of the dispute. Nevertheless, in early April 2007, Peruvian nationalistic sectors, mainly represented by left wing ex-presidential candidate Ollanta Humala decided to congregate at 'hito uno' right at the border with Chile, in a symbolic attempt to claim sovereignty over a maritime area known in Peru as Mar de Grau (Grau's Sea) just west of the Chilean city of Arica. Peruvian police stopped a group of nearly 2,000 people just 10 km from the border, preventing them from reaching their intended destination. Despite these incidents, the presidents of both Chile and Peru have confirmed their intentions to improve the relationships between the two countries, mainly fueled by the huge amount of commercial exchange between both countries' private sectors.: Chile has an embassy in Lima.; Peru has an embassy in Santiago.
Colombia	6 July 1822	Both countries established diplomatic relations on 6 July 1822. Main article: Colombia–Peru relations: Colombia has an embassy in Lima.; Peru has an embassy in Bogotá.; In 2024, bilateral trade between Colombia and Peru reached $2.09 billion, with Colombia exporting $1.17 billion (led by crude petroleum at $51.6 million and soap at $48.1 million) and importing $920 million from Peru (dominated by copper wire at $174 million), resulting in a $250 million trade surplus for Colombia.
Costa Rica	28 April 1851	Main article: Costa Rica–Peru relations Both countries established diplomatic relations on 28 April 1851: Costa Rica has an embassy in Lima.; Peru has an embassy in San José.
Cuba	11 January 1905	Both countries established diplomatic relations on 11 January 1905. Main article: Cuba–Peru relations: Peru had relations with Cuba prior to 1972, but broke them off in the 1960s.; Cuba has an embassy in Lima.; Peru has an embassy in Havana.
Dominican Republic	6 April 1874	Both countries established diplomatic relations on 6 April 1874 Main article: Dominican Republic–Peru relations: The Dominican Republic has an embassy in Lima.; Peru has an embassy in Santo Domingo.
Ecuador	26 September 1831	Both countries established diplomatic relations on 26 September 1831 Main article: Ecuador–Peru relations See also: Ecuadorian–Peruvian territorial dispute: In October 1998, Peru and Ecuador signed a peace accord which definitively resolved border differences which had, over the years, resulted in armed conflict. Peru and Ecuador are now jointly coordinating an internationally sponsored border integration project. The United States Government, as one of four guarantor states, was actively involved in facilitating the 1998 peace accord between Peru and Ecuador and remains committed to its implementation. The United States has pledged $40 million to the Peru-Ecuador border integration project and another $4 million to support Peruvian and Ecuadorian demining efforts along their common border.; In November 2009, Peru made an agreement with Ecuador in which Peru would export between 40 and 50 megawatts of electricity until April 2010 in order to help Ecuador with its energy crisis. Rafael Correa, Ecuador's president, expressed his gratitude to Peru for its generous aid during Ecuador's energy crisis.; Ecuador has an embassy in Lima.; Peru has an embassy in Quito and a consulate in Guayaquil.
El Salvador	10 July 1857	Both countries established diplomatic relations on 10 July 1857 Main article: El Salvador–Peru relations: El Salvador has an embassy in Lima.; Peru has an embassy in San Salvador.
Guatemala	20 April 1857	Main article: Guatemala–Peru relations Both countries established diplomatic relations on 20 April 1857: Guatemala has an embassy in Lima.; Peru has an embassy in Guatemala City.
Guyana	17 July 1971	Both countries have established diplomatic relations on 17 July 1971; Guyana is accredited to Peru from its embassy in Caracas. It also has an honorary consulate in Lima.; Peru is accredited to Guyana from its embassy in Caracas, Venezuela.; Both countries are full members of Organization of American States and Union of South American Nations.; Vice President Carl Barrington Greenidge visited Lima in 2018.
Haiti	1929	Peru is accredited to Haiti from its embassy in Santo Domingo, and has an honorary consulate in Port-au-Prince. Its embassy in the Haitian capital closed a few days prior to the 1991 Haitian coup d'état.; Haiti is accredited to Peru from its embassy in Santiago, Chile.
Honduras	5 August 1856	Main article: Honduras–Peru relations: Honduras has an embassy in Lima.; Peru has an embassy in Tegucigalpa.
Jamaica	29 April 1970	Both countries established diplomatic relations on 29 April 1970: Jamaica has a consulate in Lima; Jamaica is accredited to Peru from its embassy in Caracas.
Mexico	23 January 1823	Both countries established diplomatic relations on 23 January 1823 Main article: Mexico–Peru relations: Mexico has an interests section in Lima.; Peru has a consular office in Mexico City.; Both nations are members of the Asia-Pacific Economic Cooperation, Organization of American States, Organization of Ibero-American States and the Pacific Alliance.
Nicaragua	28 June 1850	Main article: Nicaragua–Peru relations: Nicaragua has an embassy in Lima.; Peru has an embassy in Managua.
Panama	2 March 1908	Main article: Panama–Peru relations Both countries established diplomatic relations on 2 March 1908 See also: List of ambassadors of Peru to Panama: Panama has an embassy in Lima.; Peru has an embassy in Panama City.
Paraguay	5 February 1858	Both countries established diplomatic relations on 5 February 1858 Main article: Paraguay–Peru relations: Paraguay has an embassy in Lima.; Peru has an embassy in Asunción.; Both countries are full members of the Rio Group, Latin Union, Association of Spanish Language Academies, Organization of American States, Organization of Ibero-American States and of the Union of South American Nations.; Peruvian Ministry of Foreign Relations about the relation with Paraguay (in Spanish only)
Suriname	23 June 1978	Both countries established diplomatic relations on 23 June 1978: Peru is accredited to Suriname from its embassy in Caracas.; Peruvian president Ollanta Humala visited Paramaribo in 2013.
Trinidad and Tobago	5 February 1968	Both countries established diplomatic relations on 5 February 1968 Main article: Peru-Trinidad and Tobago relations: Peru has an embassy in Port of Spain.; Trinidad and Tobago is accredited to Peru from its embassy in Caracas, Venezuela.
United States	2 May 1826	Main article: Peru–United States relations: The U.S. maintains an embassy in Lima, Peru. There is a U.S. Consular Agency in Cuzco, and the USAID building is located in Lima.
Uruguay	13 November 1858	Main article: Peru–Uruguay relations: Peru has an embassy in Montevideo.; Uruguay has an embassy in Lima and an honorary consulate in Arequipa.; In 2024, bilateral trade between Peru and Uruguay totaled $165.7 million, with Uruguay maintaining a trade surplus driven by $118 million in exports to Peru consisting primarily of rice ($62.2 million), compared to $47.7 million in Peruvian exports to Uruguay, which were led by calcium phosphates ($8.18 million); Peruvian Ministry of Foreign Relations about relations with Uruguay (in Spanish only)
Venezuela		Main article: Peru–Venezuela relations In October 2021, the leftist government of Peru re-established diplomatic relations with the leftist Venezuelan government of President Nicolas Maduro after four years. Both embassies were closed after ties were cut off in July 2024.

=== Asia ===
Country	Formal Relations Began	Notes
Armenia	9 September 1992	Armenia is accredited to Peru from its embassy in Buenos Aires, Argentina.
Azerbaijan	25 June 1996	Both countries established diplomatic relations on 25 June 1996 Main article: Azerbaijan–Peru relations: Azerbaijan has an embassy in Lima.
Bahrain	22 September 2009	Both countries established diplomatic relations on 22 September 2009: Bahrain is accredited to Peru from its embassy in Brasília.; Peru is accredited to Bahrain from its embassy in Riyadh, Saudi Arabia.; In 2024, bilateral trade between Peru and Bahrain reached $3.16 million with a $1.2 million surplus favoring Peru, driven by $2.18 million in Peruvian exports, led by fresh fruit ($414 thousand).
Bangladesh	28 February 1983	Bangladesh is accredited to Peru from its embassy in New York City.; Peru is accredited to Bangladesh from its embassy in Bangkok.
China	2 November 1971	Both countries established diplomatic relations on 2 November 1971 Main article: China–Peru relations: China has an embassy in Lima.; Peru has an embassy in Beijing and has consulates-general in Guangzhou, Hong Kong and Shanghai.
China (ROC)	26 June 1874, broken 2 November 1971	Main articles: Peru–Taiwan relations and Foreign relations of Taiwan: Taiwan has an Economic and Cultural Representative Office in Lima; Peru has a Commercial Office in Taipei.
Georgia	14 January 2010	Main article: Georgia–Peru relations Both countries established diplomatic relations on 14 January 2010: Georgia is accredited to Peru from its embassy in Brasília.; Peru has an honorary consulate in Tbilisi.
India	25 March 1963	Both countries established diplomatic relations on 25 March 1963 Main article: India–Peru relations: India has an embassy in Lima.; Peru has an embassy in New Delhi.
Indonesia	12 August 1975	Both countries established diplomatic relations on 12 August 1975 Main article: Indonesia-Peru relations: Indonesia has an embassy in Lima.; Peru has an embassy in Jakarta.
Iran	20 November 1973 (suspended)	Both countries established diplomatic relations on 20 November 1973: Iran is accredited to Peru from its embassy in Quito.; Peru is accredited to Iran from its non-resident embassy in New Delhi.; Peru had an embassy in Tehran until 1978, serviced by its lone ambassador since 1977, César de la Fuente.; Peru suspended relations with Iran on 1 September 2026.
Iraq	11 October 1975	Peru and Iraq agreed to renew their bilateral ties in 2012.; Iraq is accredited to Peru from its embassy in Caracas.
Israel	20 August 1957	Main article: Israel–Peru relations: Israel has an embassy in Lima.; Peru has an embassy in Tel Aviv.; Peruvian Ministry of Foreign Relations about relations with Israel (in Spanish only)
Japan	21 August 1873	Both countries established diplomatic relations on 21 August 1873. Main article: Japan–Peru relations: Japan has an embassy in Lima.; Peru has an embassy in Tokyo and a consulate-general in Nagoya.
Kazakhstan	6 February 1997	Both countries established diplomatic relations on 6 February 1997
Kuwait	1 December 1975	Main article: Kuwait–Peru relations Both countries established diplomatic relations on 1 December 1975: Peru has an embassy in Kuwait City.; Kuwait is accredited to Peru from Santiago, Chile.
Malaysia	24 April 1986	Both countries established diplomatic relations on 24 April 1986 Main article: Malaysia–Peru relations: Malaysia has an embassy in Lima.; Peru has an embassy in Kuala Lumpur
Mongolia	30 May 1997	Both countries established diplomatic relations on 30 May 1997: Mongolia is accredited to Peru from its embassy in Havana.; Peru is accredited to Mongolia from its embassy in Beijing.
Nepal	28 January 1976	Both countries established diplomatic relations on 28 January 1976: Nepal is accredited to Peru from its embassy in New York City.; Peru is accredited to Nepal from its embassy in India.
North Korea	15 December 1988	Both countries established diplomatic relations on 15 December 1988 Main article: North Korea–Peru relations: North Korea has an embassy in Lima.; Diplomatic relationships between both countries are suspended since 2017.
Palestine	30 April 2011	Main article: Palestine–Peru relations: Peru recognized Palestine on 24 January 2011.; Palestine has an embassy in Lima.; Palestinian immigration to Peru began in the late 19th century, remaining a minor demographic group consisting of several thousand individuals.
Philippines	30 November 1974	Both countries established diplomatic relations on 30 November 1974 Main article: Peru-Philippines relations: Peru is accredited to the Philippines from its embassy in Bangkok, Thailand.; Philippines is accredited to Peru from its embassy in Santiago, Chile.
Qatar	7 November 1989	Main article: Peru–Qatar relations At an official level, both countries began diplomatic relations in 1989.: Peru has an embassy in Doha.; Qatar has an embassy in Lima.
Saudi Arabia	19 March 1986	Main article: Peru–Saudi Arabia relations: Peru has an embassy in Riyadh.; Saudi Arabia has an embassy in Lima.
Singapore	27 October 1980	Both countries established diplomatic relations on 27 October 1980: Singapore is accredited to Peru from its embassy in Singapore.; Peru has an embassy in Singapore.
South Korea	1 April 1963	Both countries established diplomatic relations on 1 April 1963 Main article: Peru–South Korea relations: Peru has an embassy in Seoul.; South Korea has an embassy in Lima.; Signed in March 2011 and entering into force on August 1 of the same year, the Peru–South Korea Free Trade Agreement; In 2024, bilateral trade between Peru and South Korea totaled $2.86 billion.
Thailand	10 November 1965	Both countries established diplomatic relations on 10 November 1965. Main article: Peru–Thailand relations: Peru has an embassy in Bangkok.; Thailand has an embassy in Lima.
Turkey	1952	Main article: Peru–Turkey relations: Peru has an embassy in Ankara and a Consulate General in Istanbul.; Turkey has an embassy in Lima.; Trade volume between the two countries was US$250 million in 2019 (Peruvian exports/imports: 72.6/177.4 million USD).
United Arab Emirates	17 June 1986	Main article: Peru–United Arab Emirates relations: Peru has a consulate-general in Dubai.; The UAE has an embassy in Lima.; The United Arab Emirates is Peru's primary trading partner in the Arab world, in 2024 bilateral trade reached approximately $1.98 billion driven heavily by Peru’s $1.9 billion in gold exports, while the UAE exported $42.4 million to Peru, primarily consisting of ethylene polymers ($10.1 million) and refined petroleum ($6.66 million).; In October 2026, Peru and the United Arab Emirates marked the 40th anniversary of the formal establishment of their bilateral diplomatic relations.
Uzbekistan	22 December 1999	Peru and Uzbekistan established bilateral relations on 22 December 1999
Vietnam	14 November 1994	Both countries established diplomatic relations on 14 November 1994 Main article: Peru–Vietnam relations: Peru has an embassy in Hanoi.; Vietnam is accredited to Peru from its embassy in Brasília, Brazil.

=== Europe ===
Country	Formal Relations Began	Notes
Albania	6 December 1971	Both countries established diplomatic relations on 6 December 1971 Main article: Albania–Peru relations: Peru and Albania established formal relations in 1971.; Albania is accredited to Peru from its embassy in Brasília.; Peru is accredited to Albania from its embassy in Athens. Until its dissolution, Peru was accredited from its embassy in Yugoslavia.
Andorra	3 June 1997	Both countries established diplomatic relations on 3 June 1997 Main article: Andorra–Peru relations: Andorra does not hold an embassy in Peru.; Peru is accredited to Andorra from its embassy in Madrid, Spain.
Austria	2 November 1949	Main article: Austria–Peru relations: Austria has an embassy in Lima, and honorary consulates in Cuzco, Trujillo, Iquitos, and Arequipa.; Peru has an embassy in Vienna, and consulates in Innsbruck and Salzburg.
Belarus	19 February 1997	Both countries established diplomatic relations on 19 February 1997 In 1999, Foreign Minister Sergei Martynov visited Peru.: Belarus is accredited to Peru from its embassy in Buenos Aires, Argentina.; Peru is accredited to Belarus from its embassy in Moscow, Russia.
Belgium	1 April 1852	Main article: Belgium–Peru relations: Belgium has an embassy in Lima.; Peru has an embassy in Brussels.
Bosnia and Herzegovina	23 January 1998	Both countries established diplomatic relations on 23 January 1998 Main article: Bosnia and Herzegovina–Peru relations: Peru is accredited to Bosnia and Herzegovina from its embassy in Budapest.
Bulgaria	18 April 1969	Both countries established diplomatic relations on 18 April 1969 Main article: Bulgaria–Peru relations: Peru closed its embassy in Sofia for economic reasons in 2003.; Peru is accredited to Bulgaria from its embassy in Athens, Greece.; Bulgaria is accredited to Peru from its embassy in Brasília, Brazil.; Peruvian Ministry of Foreign Relations about relations with Bulgaria (in Spanish only)
Croatia	12 January 1993	Both countries established diplomatic relations on 12 January 1993 Main article: Croatia–Peru relations: Croatia is accredited to Peru through its embassy in Santiago, Chile and maintains an honorary consulate in Lima.; Peru is accredited to Croatia through its embassy in Bucharest, Romania and maintains an honorary consulate in Zagreb.; There are around 6,500 people of Croatian descent living in Peru. Most Croats arrived in Peru between the Interwar period.; Croatian Ministry of Foreign Affairs and European Integration: list of bilateral treaties with Peru
Cyprus	19 September 1966	Both countries established diplomatic relations on 19 September 1966. On October of the same year, relations were elevated to embassy level.; Cyprus is represented in Peru through its embassy in Brasília, Brazil.; Peru is accredited to Cyprus from it missions in Italy.
Czech Republic	11 July 1922, broken 4 October 1957, restored 27 December 1968 ( with Czech Republic from 2 January 1993)	Main article: Czech Republic–Peru relations Both countries re-established diplomatic relations on 27 December 1968: Peru first established relations with Czechoslovakia in 1922. Relations were broken in 1957 and the Peruvian Ambassador was recalled under the government of Manuel A. Odría.; Czech Republic has an embassy in Lima.; Peru has an embassy in Prague.
Denmark		Denmark is accredited to Peru from its embassy in Santiago, Chile.; Peru is accredited to Denmark from its embassy in Stockholm, Sweden. It formerly had an embassy in Copenhagen until its closure in 2003.
Estonia	27 July 1995	Both countries established diplomatic relations on 27 July 1995 Main article: Estonia–Peru relations: Estonia is accredited to Peru from its embassy in Helsinki.; Peruvian ambassadors to Estonia; Peru is accredited to Estonia from its embassy in Helsinki.; Estonian ambassadors to Peru; Mart Tarmak: 2015–2021; Urmas Eigla: 2021–present
Finland	29 March 1963	Both countries established diplomatic relations on 29 March 1963 Main article: Finland–Peru relations: Peru recognized Finland on June 23, 1919.; Peru has an embassy in Helsinki.; Finland has an embassy in Lima.; Ministry for Foreign Affairs of Finland about Peru
European Union	2000	Main article: European Union–Peru relations: The European Union has a consulate in Lima.; Peru has a section of its Ministry of Foreign Affairs dedicated to the European Union, as well as diplomatic relationships with its members.
France	1826	Main article: France–Peru relations: France has an embassy in Lima.; Peru has an embassy in Paris.
Germany	28 June 1951 (Federal Republic); 28 December 1972 – 1990 (Democratic Republic)	Both countries established diplomatic relations on 3 June 1871. Main article: Germany–Peru relations: Peru has an embassy in Berlin and consulates-general in Hamburg, Munich and Offenbach.; Germany has an embassy in Lima, and honorary consulates in Arequipa, Piura, Bagua, and Trujillo.; Formal diplomatic relations between the two countries have existed since the 1828. Peru established relations with the North German Confederation before 23 September 1870, recognizing the German Empire as its successor in 1871 until relations were severed on 5 October 1917. Relations were resumed on 21 May 1920, then severed again on January 26, 1943. After World War II, relations were resumed with the Federal Republic of Germany on 28 June 1951. After the 1968 Peruvian coup d'état and the establishment of Juan Velasco Alvarado's Revolutionary Government, relations with the German Democratic Republic were also established on December 28, 1972.
Greece	3 December 1965	Main article: Greece–Peru relations: Both countries established diplomatic relations on 3 December 1965; Greece has an embassy in Lima.; Peru has an embassy in Athens.
Hungary	16 April 1969	Main article: Hungary–Peru relations Both countries established diplomatic relations on 16 April 1969: Peru has an embassy in Budapest.; Hungary has an embassy in Lima.
Iceland	14 November 1967	Both countries established diplomatic relations on 14 November 1967: Iceland is accredited to Peru from its embassy in Oslo.; Peru is accredited to Peru from its embassy in Oslo.
Ireland	27 June 1999	Main article: Ireland–Peru relations Both countries established diplomatic relations on 27 June 1999: Ireland is accredited to Peru from its embassy in Mexico City and maintains an honorary consulate in Lima.; Peru has an embassy in Dublin. Until 2017, the ambassador resided in London.
Italy	23 December 1874	Both countries established diplomatic relations on 23 December 1874 Main article: Italy–Peru relations: Italy has an embassy in Lima.; Peru has an embassy in Rome and consulates-general in Florence, Genoa, Milan and Turin.
Latvia	23 July 1996	Both countries established diplomatic relations on 23 July 1996: Latvia is accredited to Peru through its embassy in Berlin.; Peru is accredited to Latvia through its embassy in Helsinki.
Liechtenstein	5 July 1996	Both countries established diplomatic relations on 5 July 1996: Liechtenstein does not have an embassy accredited to Peru.; Peru is accredited to Liechtenstein from its embassy in Bern.
Lithuania	9 June 1997	Both countries established diplomatic relations on 9 June 1997: Peru is accredited to Lithuania from its embassy in Helsinki.
Luxembourg	14 June 1962	Both countries established diplomatic relations on 14 June 1962: Luxembourg is accredited to Peru through its embassy in Berlin.; Peru is accredited to Luxembourg from its embassy in Brussels.
Malta	27 April 1977	Both countries established diplomatic relations on 27 April 1977: Malta has two honorary consulates in Lima and Arequipa.; Peru has an honorary consulate in Valletta.
Netherlands	1 February 1826	Main article: Netherlands–Peru relations: Netherlands has an embassy in Lima.; Peru has an embassy in The Hague and a consulate-general in Amsterdam.
Norway	3 August 1923	Main article: Norway–Peru relations Both countries established diplomatic relations on 3 August 1923: Peru has an embassy in Oslo.; Norway has a consulate-general in Lima and is accredited from its embassy in Santiago, Chile.
Poland	6 September 1923	Both countries established diplomatic relations on 6 September 1923. Peru refused to recognize the Polish government in London on December 29, 1945. Peru and Poland re-established diplomatic relations on 14 April 1969. Main article: Peru–Poland relations: Peru has an embassy in Warsaw.; Poland has an embassy in Lima.
Portugal	26 March 1853	Main article: Peru–Portugal relations Both countries established diplomatic relations on 26 March 1853: Peru has an embassy in Lisbon.; Portugal has an embassy in Lima.
Romania	10 October 1939, broken 5 March 1942, Re-established diplomatic relations 9 November 1968	Main article: Peru–Romania relations: Romania has an embassy in Lima and an honorary consulate in Arequipa.; The Republic of Peru has an embassy and an honorary consulate, both in Bucharest.; Diplomatic relations' level: Legation: October 10, 1939 – March 5, 1942; Embassy: since November 9, 1968; Diplomatic relations' timeline: October 10, 1939 – March 5, 1942; since November 9, 1968
Russia	16 May 1874 to 1918; 1 February 1969	Main article: Peru–Russia relations: Peru and Russia established formal relations in Saint Petersburg on 16 May 1874, which were then severed after the Russian Revolution in 1918. Relations between Peru and the Soviet Union were then established on 1 February 1969. During and after the collapse of the Soviet Union, Peru and Russia continued their relations.; Peru has an embassy in Moscow and an honorary consulate in Saint Petersburg.; Russia has an embassy in Lima and an honorary consulate in the San Isidro District.; Both countries are full members of the APEC.
San Marino	24 February 2005	Both countries established diplomatic relations on 24 February 2005: San Marino is accredited to Peru from its embassy in Rome.; Peru is accredited to San Marino from its missions in Italy.
Serbia	10 December 1968	Main articles: Peru–Serbia relations and Peru–Yugoslavia relations See also: Kosovo–Peru relations: Diplomatic relations between then Yugoslavia and Peru existed before the Second World War. They were renewed on 10 December 1968.; Serbia is accredited to Peru from its embassy in Buenos Aires.; Peru is accredited to Serbia from its embassy in Budapest.
Slovakia	1 January 1993	Main article: Peru–Slovakia relations: Slovakia is accredited to Peru from its embassy in Buenos Aires.; Peru is accredited to Slovakia from its embassy in Vienna.
Sovereign Military Order of Malta	15 April 1953	See also: List of ambassadors of the Sovereign Military Order of Malta to Peru: The Sovereign Military Order of Malta has an embassy in Lima.; Peru is accredited to the Sovereign Military Order of Malta from its embassy in the Holy See.
Spain	15 November 1879	Both countries established diplomatic relations on 15 November 1879 Main article: Peru–Spain relations: Peru has an embassy in Madrid and consulates-general in Barcelona, Bilbao, Seville and Valencia.; Spain has an embassy in Lima.; Both countries are full members of the Association of Spanish Language Academies and the Organization of Ibero-American States
Sweden	11 February 1938	Both countries established diplomatic relations on 11 February 1938. Main article: Peru–Sweden relations: Peru has an embassy in Stockholm.; Sweden is accredited to Peru from its embassy in Santiago, Chile.
Switzerland	16 September 1884	Main article: Peru–Switzerland relations: Peru has an embassy in Bern.; Switzerland has an embassy in Lima.
Ukraine	7 May 1992	Both countries established diplomatic relations on 7 May 1992 Main article: Peru–Ukraine relations: Peru was accredited to Ukraine from its embassy in Warsaw, Poland. It was formerly accredited from its embassy in Moscow, Russia.; Ukraine has an embassy in Lima.
United Kingdom	10 October 1823	Both countries established diplomatic relations on 10 October 1823. Main article: Peru–United Kingdom relations: Peru maintains an embassy in London.; The United Kingdom is accredited to Peru through its embassy in Lima.; Both countries are members of CPTPP, the International Criminal Court, and the World Trade Organization, as well as the Andean Countries–UK Free Trade Agreement. Bilaterally the two countries have an Investment Agreement.
Vatican City	1 November 1852	Main article: Holy See–Peru relations: The Holy See has a nunciature in Lima.; Peru has an embassy in Rome to the Holy See.

=== Oceania ===
Country	Formal Relations Began	Notes
Australia	1 March 1963	Both countries established diplomatic relations on 1 March 1963 Main article: Australia–Peru relations Both countries have an expanding relationship in all areas. In February 2018 trade ministers from both Peru and Australia signed a free trade agreement. Until 2019, the Peruvian ambassador was also accredited to New Zealand.: Australia has an embassy in Lima.; Peru has an embassy in Canberra and a consulate-general in Sydney.
Fiji		Fiji is accredited to Peru from its embassy in Wellington, New Zealand.; Peru is accredited to Fiji from its embassy in Canberra.
New Zealand	4 July 1972	Both countries established diplomatic relations on 4 July 1972 Main article: New Zealand–Peru relations: New Zealand is accredited to Peru from its embassy in Santiago, Chile and maintains an honorary consulate in Lima.; Peru has an embassy in Wellington.
Papua New Guinea	14 September 1983	Both countries established diplomatic relations on 14 September 1983: Peru is accredited to Papua New Guinea from its consulate-general in Sydney.

== Transnational issues ==
=== Illicit drugs ===
Until recently the world's largest coca leaf producer, Peru has reduced the area of coca under cultivation from 115,300 ha to 38,700 ha, or 66%, between 1995 and 1999; most of cocaine base is shipped to neighboring Colombia, Bolivia, and Brazil for processing into cocaine for the international drug market, but exports of finished cocaine are increasing by maritime conveyance to Mexico, US, and Europe.

== See also ==
- List of diplomatic missions in Peru
- List of diplomatic missions of Peru
- Foreign policy of Ollanta Humala
