= Kosovo–Peru relations =

Peru–Kosovo relations
- Kosovo: Peru

Kosovo–Peru relations are foreign relations between Kosovo and Peru. Peru recognised Kosovo as a sovereign state in 2008 after its declaration of independence from Serbia, although formal diplomatic relations have yet to be established.

== History ==
=== Background ===
Peru maintained warm relations with the Socialist Federal Republic of Yugoslavia, a country to which Kosovo belonged within the Socialist Republic of Serbia. In the 1960s, Yugoslav politics even tried to influence the then military regime of Juan Velasco Alvarado to oppose both Cuba and the Soviet Union.

=== Recognition ===
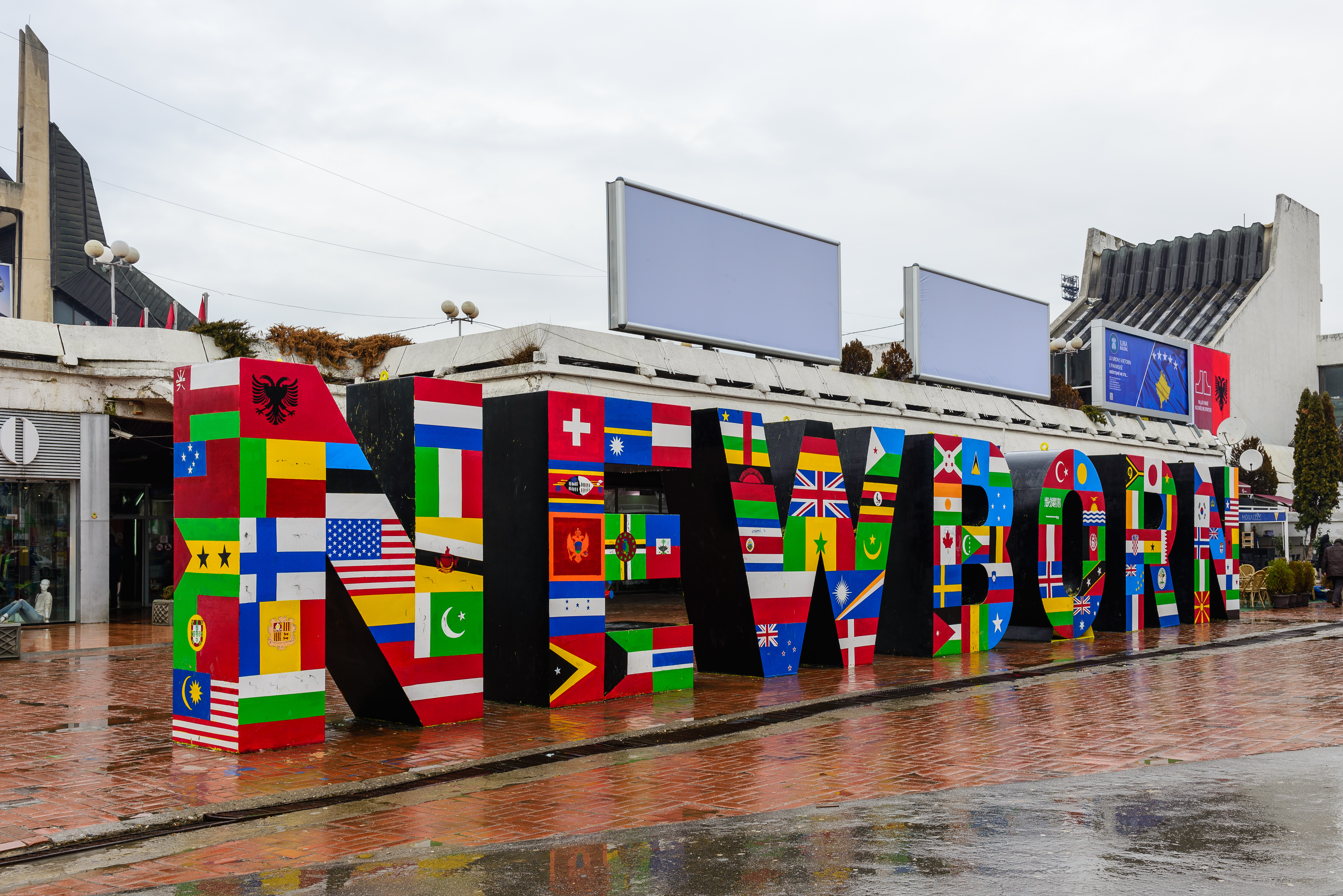
The Newborn monument in Pristina featuring the flag of Peru on the letter O.

Kosovo declared its independence from Serbia on February 17, 2008. On February 22 of that same year, the government of Alan García decided to recognise Kosovo as an independent country, which made Peru one of the four South American countries (along with Colombia, Guyana and Suriname in recognising the independence of Kosovo.

The position of the Peruvian government was criticised by the governments of Cuba and Venezuela. President Alan García sent a statement to the then president of Kosovo Fatmir Sejdiu congratulating him on independence. García also expressed that he hopes that Peruvian recognition of Kosovo does not affect the "close and cordial relationship" with Belgrade, highlighting the work of Serbian company Energoprojekt in Peru. Nevertheless, the announcement led to controversy with the Serbian authorities, who recalled their ambassador for a couple of months. This event was the main reason for the closure of the Serbian embassy in Lima.

After the Russo-Georgian War later that year, parallels were drawn between the Kosovar declaration of independence and the consolidation of Abkhazia and South Ossetia, with the Russian government and the Peruvian opposition making unsuccessful efforts to obtain the Peruvian recognition of the newly established states, with Peru instead formally establishing relations with Georgia two years later.

== See also ==
- Peru–Serbia relations
- Foreign relations of Kosovo
- Foreign relations of Peru

== Bibliography ==
- Breña Alegre, Jeancarlo Giovanni (2017). Relaciones entre el Perú y los Países Balcánicos no miembros de la Unión Europea: Retos y Perspectivas (in Spanish). Academia Diplomática del Perú Javier Pérez de Cuéllar.
