= Peru–Yugoslavia relations =

Peru-Yugoslavia relations

- Peru: Yugoslavia

Diplomatic mission
- Embassy of Peru, Belgrade: Embassy of Yugoslavia, Lima

Peru–Yugoslavia relations were historical foreign relations between Peru and Yugoslavia. Both countries had amicable relations and were active in the Non-Aligned Movement which was established in Belgrade in 1961. Peru had an embassy in Belgrade until 2006 and Yugoslavia, later Serbia, had an embassy in Lima until 2009.

== History ==
=== Kingdom of Yugoslavia ===
Relations between Peru and the then Kingdom of Yugoslavia date back to the 1920s, as the latter had established an honorary consulate in Lima and the former had consulates in Belgrade and Zagreb by 1929. The former also had a Croat minority present in the city's capital, Callao and Cerro de Pasco, represented by the Yugoslav Society in central Lima. During World War II in Yugoslavia, Peru established economic and consular relations with the Yugoslav government-in-exile in October 1942. The consulate and embassy accredited to Peru were then located in Santiago de Chile.

=== Socialist Federal Republic of Yugoslavia ===
In 1950, both countries organized cultural exchanges among its citizens aimed at development of further relations. In 1963, President Josip Broz Tito organized a month long (18 September – 17 October) South American tour during which he visited Brazil, Chile, Bolivia, Peru and Mexico. In Peru he met President Fernando Belaúnde Terry.

After Juan Velasco Alvarado's coup d'état against Fernando Belaúnde and the establishment of his so-called revolutionary government, Peru reestablished relations with the countries of the second world, including the Socialist Federal Republic of Yugoslavia in 1967. Thus, the Yugoslav consulate was opened in Lima, replacing the honorary consulate. Relations were then upgraded to embassy level on December of the following year, and the embassy of Peru in Belgrade was opened on the same year. After Peru recognized and established relations with Albania in late 1971, the ambassador in Belgrade became accredited to Albania

The first Yugoslav ambassador presented his credentials on January 9, 1971. On the same year, Yugoslav Foreign Minister Mirko Tepavac invited Peruvian politician Luis Edgardo Mercado Jarrín to official visit to Yugoslavia. Yugoslav diplomacy wanted to develop its relations with countries in Latin America which were not right-wing dictatorships with an aim to engage them in the Non-Aligned Movement. The country believed that other Latin American countries will be in a position to counterbalance Cuban efforts to de facto align the movement with Eastern Bloc.

=== Relations after 1971 ===
After the death of Tito, a Peruvian delegation headed by Pedro Richter Prada, then Prime Minister of Peru, was sent to the state funeral held on May 8, 1980.

During the internal conflict in Peru, due to the region's support of the Peruvian government and lack of support for the terror group, embassies of the Eastern Bloc were attacked by the Shining Path on several occasions, such as in 1986, when the Soviet embassy was attacked, or in 1987, when the North Korean embassy was bombed. The Yugoslav embassy was not spared from the conflict either, as it was also the target of an unsuccessful bombing on September 4, 1981.

After the breakup of Yugoslavia, Peru continued relations with the Federal Republic of Yugoslavia (Serbia and Montenegro) and its other successor states, such as Croatia in 1993. The Peruvian embassy in Belgrade closed in 2006, a couple of months after the independence of Montenegro, and the Peruvian Ambassador to Romania became accredited to Serbia until 2018, when the Peruvian Ambassador to Hungary became accredited instead after a series of reforms. On the other hand, the Serbian embassy's closure was announced and finalized in 2009, with the Serbian mission in Buenos Aires becoming accredited to Peru instead.

During the 2016 Peruvian general election, the National Office of Electoral Processes accidentally listed the Honorary Consulate of Peru in Belgrade as being located in Yugoslavia, while at the same time listing North Macedonia as a separate state, where only three people voted.

== See also ==
- Bosnia and Herzegovina–Peru relations
- Croatia–Peru relations
- Kosovo–Peru relations
- Peru–Serbia relations
- Yugoslavia and the Non-Aligned Movement
- Croatian Peruvians

== Bibliography ==
- Burin, Marko (2009). La familia croata en el Peru (in Spanish). Marko Burin.
