= Albania–Peru relations =

- Albania: Peru

Albania–Peru relations refers to the bilateral relations between Albania and Peru. Albania is accredited to Peru through its embassy in Brasília, Brazil, while and a Peru is accredited to Albania through its embassy in Athens, Greece. Both countries are members of the United Nations.

== History ==
Peru and Albania established diplomatic relations on December 6, 1971. The embassy of Peru in Belgrade became accredited to Albania, and the Albanian embassy in Havana became accredited to Peru. Despite Peru's warm relations with neighbouring Yugoslavia, Albania's isolationist policy under Enver Hoxha kept diplomatic relations from developing further between both countries.

In 2009, Peru presented a visa exemption project in Athens to Albania, who accepted the suggestion and requested that it be signed at the UN meeting that would take place in September 2015. This did not happen, and the agreement was only signed on June 19, 2017. Albania presented its part of the agreement to Peru earlier that year.

On the judicial side, Peru and Albania had an extradition process open due to former Foreign Minister Augusto Blacker Miller committing fraud to build a waste processing plant. It ultimately did not happen due to Blacker being a naturalised Albanian citizen, and he was sentenced in Albania to eight years in prison.

The Albanian mafia started operating in Peru in 2021, when two members illegally entered Trujillo through Ecuador on November of said year, operating with local exporting businesses to ship liquid cocaine to the ports of Rotterdam and Antwerp.

== Trade ==
Trade between Peru and Albania only surpassed US$ 500,000 in 2016. Albania's main export is veterinarian medical products, and its main imports are wind instruments and ferrochrome. On the other hand, Peru's exports to Albania in 2015 were seeds (33% of total exports), pharmaceuticals (29%), frozen fish (22%) and plastic sheeting (9%).

== Diplomatic missions ==
- Albania is accredited to Peru from its embassy in Brasília.
- Peru is accredited to Albania from its embassy in Athens.

== See also ==
- Foreign relations of Albania
- Foreign relations of Peru

== Bibliography ==
- Breña Alegre, Jeancarlo Giovanni (2017). "Relaciones entre el Perú y los Países Balcánicos no miembros de la Unión Europea: Retos y Perspectivas". Academia Diplomática del Perú Javier Pérez de Cuéllar (in Spanish).
