= Libya–Peru relations =

Libya-Peru relations
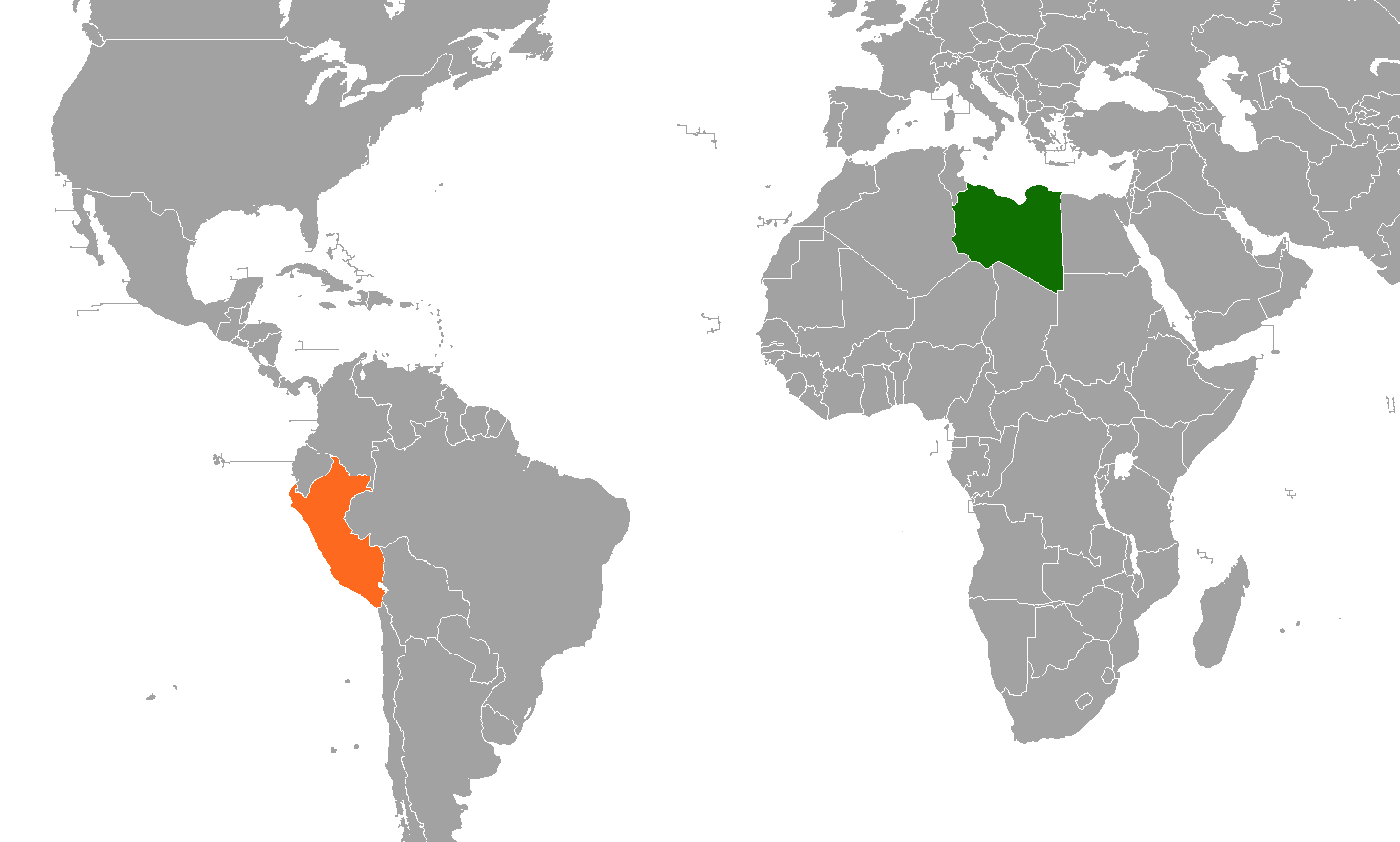

- Libya: Peru

Libya–Peru relations are the bilateral relations between Libya and Peru. Both countries are members of the United Nations and the Non-Aligned Movement.

Peru maintained formal relations with the Libyan Arab Jamahiriya, led by Muammar Gaddafi, until February 21, 2011, the date on which the Peruvian government officially broke relations with Libya due to accusations of human rights violations by Gaddafi against its civilian population. Peru was the first country at the international level to break relations with Libya before the first Libyan civil war.

== History ==
During the internal conflict in Peru, the Shining Path received support from Gaddafi's Libya, according to multiple sources, such as the CIA.

In 2006, the commercial exchange between Peru and Libya reached US$ 37 million. Peruvian exports in that year reached the figure of US$23 million.

In 2008, Peruvian economist Hernando de Soto advised Gaddafi on economic issues, which was highly questioned during his candidacy for the presidency of Peru during the 2021 general election. De Soto responded to the criticisms by saying "I have advised dictators, but that is irrelevant."

Gaddafi was invited to the ASPA Summit to be hosted in Lima in February 2011, although the event was ultimately postponed until 2012 due to the Arab Spring.

=== Libyan crisis (2011) ===
In 2011, then president of Peru Alan García, during his second government, expressed that "Peru suspends all diplomatic relations with Libya until the violence against the people ceases." In addition, García was also the first president to suggest the creation of an exclusion zone on Libya. The former Minister of Foreign Relations of Peru, Luis Gonzales Posada, described the government's decision as "enormous moral importance" and the then Minister of Foreign Relations José Antonio García Belaúnde expressed that he hopes that other Latin American countries follow suit, while the governments from Cuba and Venezuela criticised the Peruvian position.

On February 26, 2011, after breaking relations with Libya, García described the Gaddafi government as a "bloody dictatorship" and justified his management's position by saying that "we should not act as spectators of the bombings by the Libyan air force on civilian targets”, and finally said that he defends democracy and freedom in Libya.

According to analysts, García's position would be related to trying to improve the image of the Peruvian State regarding human rights, with special emphasis on criticism of the Peruvian government, especially the crimes against humanity committed by President Alberto Fujimori and even during the García's first term in relation to the counterinsurgency repression during the conflict by the terrorist groups Shining Path and MRTA, all of which occurred between the years 1980 and 2000.

The then President of the Peruvian Congress, César Zumaeta, similar to García, justified the position of the Peruvian government, also saying that "it is madness and an adventure for Gaddafi to want to liquidate his people with force, demonstrating a high level of intolerance" and for this reason the UN should intervene in Libya.

=== Relations since 2011 ===
In December 2018, the Peruvian Foreign Ministry condemned a jihadist attack carried out against the facilities of the Ministry of Foreign Affairs of the State of Libya.

In 2020, the Peruvian government, through an official note, congratulated the end of hostilities between the warring parties in the Second Libyan Civil War.

== Diplomatic missions ==
- Libya is accredited to Peru from its embassy in Brasília.
- Peru was accredited to Libya from its embassy in Algiers.

== See also ==
- Foreign relations of Libya
- Foreign relations of Peru
- List of ambassadors of Peru to Libya
