= List of ambassadors of Georgia to Peru =

Representative of Georgia to Peru

Ambassador of Georgia to Peru
- საქართველოს ელჩი პერუში
- Seal of the Ministry of Foreign Affairs
- Incumbent; Nikoloz Sakhvadze since 2021
- Ministry of Foreign Affairs of Georgia
- Style: His Excellency (formal); Mr. Ambassador (informal)
- Reports to: Minister of Foreign Affairs of Georgia
- Seat: Brasília
- Nominator: Prime Minister of Georgia
- Appointer: President of Georgia
- Formation: 2011

The Georgian ambassador to Peru is the official representative of the president of Georgia and the Georgian Government to the president and government of Peru, accredited from Brazil. The position is held by Nikoloz Sakhvadze.

Relations between both countries were formally established on January 14, 2010.

== List of representatives ==
Name	Portrait	Appointment	Presentation	Termination	Prime Minister	Notes
Otar Berdzenishvili (ოთარ ბერძენიშვილი)		2011	November 7, 2011	2016	Nika Gilauri	
David Solomonia (დავით სოლომონია)		2017	June 12, 2017	2021	Giorgi Kvirikashvili	
Nikoloz Sakhvadze (ნიკოლოზ სახვაძე)				Incumbent	Irakli Garibashvili	As chargé d'affaires.

== See also ==
- Georgia–Peru relations
- List of ambassadors of Peru to Georgia
