= List of ambassadors of Peru to Belgium =

Ambassador of Peru to the Kingdom of Belgium, the Grand Duchy of Luxembourg — Head of Mission to the European Union
- Great Seal of Peru
- Ministry of Foreign Affairs; Tervueren 212, Brussels
- Appointer: The president of Peru
- Formation: 1851 (Belgium); 1953 (Luxembourg); January 25, 1961 (EU)
- Website: Embassy of Peru in Belgium, Luxembourg — Mission to the European Union

The extraordinary and plenipotentiary ambassador of Peru to the Kingdom of Belgium, the Grand Duchy of Luxembourg and head of mission to the European Union is the official representative of the Republic of Peru to the Kingdom of Belgium and the Grand Duchy of Luxembourg who also serves as the Head of Mission to the European Union.

Peru is accredited to all three entities from its embassy in Brussels.

== List of representatives ==
Name	Portrait	Term begin	Term end	President	Notes
Manuel Irigoyen Larrea		1861	1865	Ramón Castilla	Chargé d'Affaires to Belgium
Manuel Arizola		1872	1872	José Balta	Chargé d'Affaires to Belgium
José de la Riva-Agüero y Looz-Corswarem		1876	1877	Manuel Pardo	Minister Plenipotentiary
José Francisco Canevaro		1887	1891	Andrés Avelino Cáceres	Minister Plenipotentiary in Brussels and The Hague; Count of Zoagli
José de Araníbar		1891	1893	Remigio Morales Bermúdez	Minister Plenipotentiary in Brussels
Manuel Álvarez Calderón		?	1915	?	Minister Plenipotentiary in Brussels
Francisco García Calderón Rey		November 12, 1918	March 11, 1921	José Pardo y Barreda	Minister Plenipotentiary in Brussels
Eduardo S. Leguía		September 22, 1921	March 9, 1922	Augusto B. Leguía	Chargé d'Affaires to Belgium
Germán Cisneros Raygada		March 9, 1922	January 3, 1924	Augusto B. Leguía	Chargé d'Affaires to Belgium
Guillermo Swayne y Mendoza		January 3, 1924	1928	Augusto B. Leguía	Chargé d'Affaires to Belgium
Antonio Miró Quesada de la Guerra		1933	1934	Luis Miguel Sánchez Cerro	Minister Plenipotentiary in Brussels
Enrique Goytisolo Bolognesi		1935	1935	Óscar R. Benavides	Minister Plenipotentiary in Brussels
Ventura García Calderón		1935	1939	Óscar R. Benavides	Minister Plenipotentiary in Brussels
Edwin Letts Sánchez		March 22, 1943	July 1945	Manuel Prado Ugarteche	Minister Plenipotentiary in Brussels
Pablo Abril de Vivero		1956	1959	Manuel Prado Ugarteche	Chargé d’affaires a.i. to the Belgian government in exile in London. He was also the chargé d’affaires en pied to the Polish government-in-exile, the Netherlands, Czechoslovakia, Norway and Yugoslavia.
César Canevaro y Laos		1961	1962	Manuel Prado Ugarteche	Minister Plenipotentiary
Carlos Miró-Quesada Laos		1963	1969	Nicolás Lindley López	Ambassador
Julio Doig Sánchez		1971	?	Juan Velasco Alvarado	Ambassador
Emilio Barreto Bermeo	Ambassador	1976	?	Francisco Morales Bermúdez	Ambassador
Julio Ego-Aguirre Álvarez		1979	?	Francisco Morales Bermúdez	Ambassador
Jorge Guillermo Llosa Pautrat		1983	?	Fernando Belaúnde	Ambassador
Julio Ego-Aguirre Álvarez		1985	?	Fernando Belaúnde	Ambassador
Guillermo del Solar Rojas		1992	?	Alberto Fujimori	Ambassador
José Antonio Arróspide del Busto		November 6, 1995	2000/2004	Alberto Fujimori	Ambassador in Brussels and Peruvian Representative to the European Union
Luis Chuquihuaura Chil		2004	2006	Alejandro Toledo	Ambassador
Jorge Valdez Carrillo		2006	2011	Alan García	Ambassador
Cristina Ronquillo de Blödorn		2011	2016	Ollanta Humala	Ambassador
Gonzalo Gutiérrez Reinel		January 1, 2017	September 29, 2022	Pedro Pablo Kuczynski	Ambassador.
Luis Enrique Chavez Basagoitia		October 20, 2022	October 10, 2025	Pedro Castillo	Ambassador since December 1 2022. He was accredited to Luxembourg on December 25 of the same year.

== See also ==
- Belgium–Peru relations
- European Union–Peru relations
- List of ambassadors of Belgium to Peru
- List of ambassadors of the European Union to Peru
