= Bosnia and Herzegovina–Peru relations =

- Bosnia and Herzegovina: Peru

Bosnia and Herzegovina–Peru relations refers to the bilateral relations between Bosnia and Herzegovina and Peru. Both countries are members of the United Nations.

Before the country's independence, Peru maintained warm relations with Bosnia's predecessor state, Yugoslavia.

== History ==
Bosnia and Herzegovina and Peru established diplomatic relations on January 23, 1998, and the Peruvian embassy in Belgrade thus became accredited to the country. After the embassy closed in 2006, the embassy in Bucharest became accredited instead. The Bosnian embassy in Washington, D.C. is accredited to Peru.

The Bosnian government has repeatedly supported Peru's candidacies to councils of the United Nations, such as those of the International Maritime Organization, UNESCO and the Committee on Enforced Disappearances, as well as the International Law Commission.

In 2021, Peru established a traveling consulate in Sarajevo.

Both countries are affected by organised crime groups, such as the Serbian America group, which operates in the Balkans and has led to at least one arrest in northern Peru involving Interpol.

== High-level visits ==
High-level visit from Bosnia and Herzegovina to Peru

- Foreign Minister Mladen Ivanić (2004)

== Trade ==
Commerce between both countries was negatively affected by the closure of the Peruvian embassy in Belgrade. In 2005, Peruvian exports were valued at US$ 400,000 and at US$ 2 million in 2006. In 2007, this number dropped to zero, as Peru did not export any goods on that year, as well as in 2009, 2011, 2013, 2014 and 2016. In contrast, Bosnian exports—mainly lubricant and carburetor filters and shoewear—steadily increased until 2016, being valued at over US$ 700,000.

Bosnian investment in South America is low, with Peru ranking fourth in exports in 2016. Bosnia and Herzegovina exports vinyl chloride polymers, rubber shoewear, centrifuges, and other home products. Peru contributes 1% of imports to the Balkan country, importing bone meal (43% of total imports), seeds (18.7%), legumes (10%), bananas (5.3%), mollusks (5.2%), etc.

In 2024, bilateral merchandise trade between Peru and Bosnia and Herzegovina totaled $7.39 million, resulting in a $3.45 million trade surplus for Peru. Peruvian exports to Bosnia and Herzegovina reached $5.42 million, led by raw tin products ($4.02 million), oil seeds ($501,000), and edible fruits and nuts ($459,000). Conversely, Bosnian exports to Peru totaled $1.97 million, primarily comprising explosive products and detonating fuses ($874,000), mechanical machinery and parts ($383,000), and footwear ($326,000).

== Diplomatic missions ==
Neither country has a resident ambassador.

- Bosnia and Herzegovina is accredited to Peru from its embassy in Washington, D.C.
- Peru is accredited to Bosnia and Herzegovina from its embassy in Bucharest.

== See also ==
- Foreign relations of Bosnia and Herzegovina
- Foreign relations of Peru

== Bibliography ==
- Breña Alegre, Jeancarlo Giovanni (2017). Relaciones entre el Perú y los Países Balcánicos no miembros de la Unión Europea: Retos y Perspectivas (in Spanish). Academia Diplomática del Perú Javier Pérez de Cuéllar.
