= List of ambassadors of Belgium to Peru =

Belgian Ambassador to Peru
- Arms of the Kingdom of Belgium
- Incumbent; Yannick Minsier since 2025
- Style: His Excellency
- Website: Official website

The Belgian ambassador to Peru is the highest representative of the Kingdom of Belgium to the Republic of Peru. The ambassador is also accredited to Bolivia and Ecuador.

Both countries established relations in the 19th century. During World War II, the Peruvian government appointed a chargé d’affaires (a.i.) to the Belgian government in exile in London, also accredited to other governments-in-exile.

== Embassy ==
The Belgian embassy in Lima is located in the district of Miraflores. Belgium maintained an ambassadorial residence at Jirón Sánchez Cerro 1960, located in the district of Jesús María until it moved to Barranco in 2021. In 2025, the house's belongings were auctioned off.

== List of heads of mission ==
Name	Title	Term start	Term end	Monarch	Notes
Leon Le Maire	MPEE	?	1904	Leopold II	Left for Saint Petersburg after his term concluded.
Leon Guislain	MPEE	1904		Leopold II	Named in 1904, he arrived in Callao only on February 17, 1912, after recently being named an officer of the Order of Leopold.
Frédéric de Ridder	Amb.			Leopold II	
Ronald Watteeuw	Amb.	February 1972		Baudouin	
Willy Tielemans	Amb.	c. 1990	c.2000	Baudouin	
Eric Focke	Amb.	2000		Albert II	
Marie-Louise Vanherk	Amb.	2003	2009	Albert II	
Beatriz Van Hemeldonck	Amb.	August 7, 2009	2013	Albert II	
Michel Dewez	Amb.	November 5, 2013	2017	Philippe	
Koenraad Lenaerts	Amb.	October 25, 2017	2021	Philippe	
Mark Van de Vreken	Amb.	September 8, 2021	July 2025	Philippe	
Yannick Minsier	Amb.	2025	Incumbent	Philippe	

== See also ==
- Belgium–Peru relations
- List of ambassadors of Peru to Belgium
