= List of ambassadors of Romania to Peru =

Ambassador of Romania to Peru
- Ambasadorul român în Peru
- Coat of arms of Romania
- Incumbent; Camelia Ion-Radu since March 22, 2021
- Inaugural holder: Mircea Nicolaescu
- Formation: December 28, 1970

The Romanian Ambassador in Lima is the official representative of the Government in Bucharest to the Government of Peru. The ambassador in Lima is also accredited to the Plurinational State of Bolivia and the Republic of Ecuador.

Both countries established relations on October 10, 1939. Peru severed its relations as a result of World War II, but reestablished them at en embassy level with the Socialist Republic of Romania on November 9, 1968, after the 1968 Peruvian coup d'état and the establishment of Juan Velasco Alvarado's Revolutionary Government. Under Velasco Alvarado's tenure, Peru pursued closer relations with Romania and the rest of the Soviet bloc.

== List of representatives ==
Ambassador	Term start	Term end	President	Notes
9 November 1968: Relations reestablished at embassy level after being severed due to World War II
Mircea Nicolaescu	December 28, 1970	December 1974	Nicolae Ceaușescu	First ambassador to Peru. He was awarded the Order of the Sun on December 3 for his services.
Ion Comănescu	1974	at least 1980	Nicolae Ceaușescu	
December 1989: Dissolution of the Socialist Republic of Romania
Ion Vasile			Emil Constantinescu	As chargé d'affaires.
Gheorghe Liciu	December 2001	2003	Ion Iliescu	Started as a chargé d'affaires until his appointment on December 12, 2001.
Stefan Costin	2004	January 2010	Ion Iliescu	Also accredited to Ecuador.
Stefan Nicolae	August 25, 2011	2016	Traian Băsescu	As chargé d'affaires.
Gabriel Gafita	November 25, 2016	2020	Klaus Iohannis	
Camelia Ion-Radu	March 22, 2021	Incumbent	Klaus Iohannis	

== See also ==
- List of ambassadors of Peru to Romania
