= List of ambassadors of Greece to Peru =

Ambassador of Greece to Peru
- Coat of Arms of Greece
- Inaugural holder: Alcibiades Carokis
- Formation: 1990s

The Greek Ambassador to Peru is the Ambassador of the government of Greece to the government of Peru.

Both countries established relations in 1965, which have continued since.

== List of representatives ==
#	Name	Term begin	Term end	President	Notes
1st	Alcibiades Carokis (Αλκιβιάδης Καρόκης)		February 1997	Konstantinos Karamanlis	First ambassador until February 1997 and also one of the hostages during the Japanese embassy hostage crisis.
2nd	Constantino Pisjinas	1997	1999	Konstantinos Stephanopoulos	
3rd	Jean Neonakis	1999	early 2003	Konstantinos Stephanopoulos	
4th	Vassilis Simantirakis	2004	2009	Konstantinos Stephanopoulos	
5th	Ioannis Papadopoulos (Ιωάννης Παπαδόπουλος)	March 15, 2009	2011	Karolos Papoulias	
6th	Dimitris Hatzopoulos (Δημήτρης Χατζόπουλος)	January 9, 2012	2015	Karolos Papoulias	
7th	Yerassimos Davaris (Γεράσιμος Δάβαρης)	2016	2019	Prokopis Pavlopoulos	
8th	Dimitrios Zoitos (Δημήτριος Ζωητός)	2019	2021	Prokopis Pavlopoulos	
9th	Eleni Lianidou (Ελένη Λιανίδου)	November 2021	2026	Katerina Sakellaropoulou	

== See also ==
- List of ambassadors of Peru to Greece
