= Croatia–Peru relations =

- Croatia: Peru

Croatia–Peru relations refers to the bilateral relations between Republic of Croatia and the Republic of Peru. Both countries established diplomatic relations on January 12, 1993. Croatia is represented in Peru through its embassy in Santiago and through an honorary consulate in Lima. Peru is represented in Croatia through its embassy in Bucharest and through an honorary consulate in Zagreb.

A large community of people of Croatian descent live in Peru, mostly in Lima, Callao and Cerro de Pasco. Most Croats arrived in Peru between the Interwar period. Over a dozen families of Croatian descent live in Arequipa alone. In Lima, there are over 40 families.

== History ==
=== 20th century ===
Croatian immigrants to Peru first arrived during the 16th century, arriving from Dalmatia to coastal Peru. Dubrovnik lord Basilije Basiljević came to Peru in 1573, attracted by the legend of El Dorado. In Cusco, the capital of the Incas, Croatian sailors and Basiljević built the church of St. Blaise. Later, the Divočići and Škrabonje families and other settlers came from the Dubrovnik region. A larger number of Croats arrived in Peru in the second half of the 19th and the beginning of the 20th century, when the business of exporting natural guano fertilizer flourished. Later, Croats began to deal with copper, gold and silver. On January 7, 1906, the Slavic Charitable Society was founded by local slavs, most of them Croats. Ivan Ostoja was named as president and the Honorary Consul of Austria, Walter Justus, was named as honorary president. In 1911, a dispute arose over which flag to use for the society, which led to some Serbian members leaving the organisation, founding a parallel society the same year that functioned until 1917, when the Serbs again joined the Slavic society after the removal of the portraits of Emperor Franz Joseph I of Austria and his consort due to the nationalist sentiment that arose during World War I.

Relations between Peru and the then Kingdom of Yugoslavia date back to the 1920s, as the latter had established an honorary consulate in Lima and the former had consulates in Belgrade and Zagreb by 1929. The Croat minority in Peru present in the city's capital, Callao and Cerro de Pasco, was represented by the Yugoslav Society in central Lima. During World War II in Yugoslavia, Peru established economic and consular relations with the Yugoslav government-in-exile in October 1942. The honorary consulate in Lima was at the time administered by Croats, while the official consulate and embassy were located in Chile.

After World War II, a new wave of Croats arrived to Peru, with most of them being combatants who fought against the partisan forces of Josep Broz Tito. The earliest arrivals happened in 1948 and 1949 due to the efforts of the International Refugee Organization (IRO) and the cooperation of the government of José Luis Bustamante y Rivero. In 1948, after the Second World War, a group of about 1000 Croatian political emigrants from all over Croatia arrived in Peru. According to the 1993 Peruvian census, there were 187 persons who identified themselves as Croatian, while 269 did so as Yugoslavs.

In 1969, the Yugoslav Society moved to its current location in the district of Jesús María in Lima. During this time, it became a non-profit society, changing into more of a recreational club. In 1973 it changed its name to Dubrovnik Yugoslav Association, and during the 1990s due to the Yugoslav Wars, changing to its current name, Dubrovnik Croat Association, in 1994. The club now acts as the honorary consulate of Croatia in Peru.

=== Recent history ===
After the breakup of Yugoslavia, Peru continued relations with the Federal Republic of Yugoslavia (Serbia and Montenegro) but also recognised its successor states, such as Croatia in 1993.

Both countries signed a memorandum of understanding in 2013.

Croatia became a part of the free trade agreement between Peru, Colombia (and later Ecuador) and the European Union in 2015.

== High-level visits ==
High-level visits from Croatia to Peru

- Minister of Foreign and European Affairs Gordan Grlić-Radman (2024)

== See also ==
- Foreign relations of Croatia
- Foreign relations of Peru
- Croatian Peruvians
- List of ambassadors of Peru to Croatia
- Peru–Yugoslavia relations

== Bibliography ==
- Burin, Marko (2009). La familia croata en el Peru (in Spanish). Marko Burin.
- Pletickosich López, Jianphier (2017). La inmigración croata a Arequipa, siglo XX (Thesis) (in Spanish). Arequipa: Universidad Católica de San Pablo.
- Puh Ponce, Pedro. "BREVE RESEÑA HISTÓRICA". Asociación Croata Dubrovnik.
