= Namibia–Peru relations =

- Namibia: Peru

Namibia–Peru relations are the bilateral relations between the Republic of Namibia and the Republic of Peru. Namibia is accredited to Peru from its embassy in Brasília, Brazil, while Peru is accredited to Namibia from its embassy in Pretoria, South Africa. Both countries are members of the Non-Aligned Movement and the United Nations.

== History ==
Peru established diplomatic relations with the Republic of South Africa in 1974. At the time, the country enforced its policy of Apartheid and controlled the territory of Namibia, at the time known as South West Africa. International opposition to the country's racial policies forced it into international isolation. Peru was an active participant of this opposition, and in protest of the policy and the occupation of Namibia, it closed its consulate in Cape Town in 1985.

In 1986, prior to Namibian independence and as part of the protests, the Peruvian government established relations with the South West Africa People's Organisation (SWAPO), which would become the ruling party of an independent Namibia in 1989, during that year's summit of the Non-Aligned Movement. As part of this development, SWAPO President Sam Nujoma visited Lima on March 19, 1987, where he met with president Alan García and a SWAPO representative office was opened in July of the same year.

As part of the independence process, Peruvian troops took part in the United Nations Transition Assistance Group, being personally thanked by Secretary-General Javier Pérez de Cuéllar, a Peruvian diplomat. The ambassador of Peru to Kenya at the time, Fortunato Isasi Cayo, presided the Peruvian delegation that participated in the celebrations of the country's independence in Windhoek from March 20 to 22, 1990.

After independence, relations with the new Namibian state were formalised on July 11, 1990.

== High-level visits ==
- President Sam Nujoma (1987)

== Diplomatic missions ==
- Namibia is accredited to Peru from its embassy in Brasília. A diplomatic mission formerly operated in Lima.
- Peru is accredited to Namibia from its embassy in Pretoria.

== Trade ==
In 2020, Peruvian exports to Namibia increased as a result of the COVID-19 pandemic by 118%, being valued at US$100 million.

== See also ==
- Foreign relations of Namibia
- Foreign relations of Peru
- List of ambassadors of Peru to Namibia
