= Ireland–Peru relations =

- Ireland: Peru

Diplomatic mission
- None (Accredited from Santiago): Embassy of Peru, Dublin

Ireland–Peru relations refers to the bilateral relations between the Republic of Ireland and the Republic of Peru. Both countries are members of the United Nations.

== History ==
Relations between Peru and Ireland date back to the Viceroyalty of Peru, where Ambrosio O'Higgins, a viceroy of Irish descent, governed the polity from 1796 to 1801. During the Spanish American Wars of Independence, Irish volunteers participated alongside British troops in the Peruvian War of Independence. One such example is the presence of an Irish battalion during the decisive battle of Ayacucho, as well as during the battles of Pinchincha (of the Ecuadorian campaign), among other engagements. Notable Irishmen during this early decade include Daniel Florence O'Leary and Francis O'Connor. Another wave of immigrants came during the guano boom in Peru under the presidency of Ramón Castilla, eventually forming a small community in Callao.

Bilateral relations were formally established on June 27, 1999. Until 2017, the Peruvian ambassador in London was concurrent with Ireland. Peru inaugurated an embassy in Dublin in September 2017. The first resident ambassador to the country was Carmen McEvoy, whose great-grandparents left Ireland during the famine of the 1850s.

== High-level visits ==
High-level visits from Ireland to Peru

- President Michael D. Higgins (2017)
- Minister of State for Trade Promotion, Digital and Company Regulation Dara Calleary (2024).

== Trade ==
An Irish-Peruvian chamber of commerce operates in Peru to promote Irish interests in the country.

In 2022, trade between the two countries totaled US$111.4 million. Irish exports to Peru accounted for US$77.7 million with sectors such as chemical products for medical purposes and milk by-products being the most common. Meanwhile, Peruvian exports to Ireland accounted for US$33.7 million with essential oils making up about 23.7% of all exports. Agricultural products are also one of Peru's main exports with tropical fruits and coffee being the most sent to Ireland.

== Resident diplomatic missions ==
- Ireland is accredited to Peru from its embassy in Santiago and has an honorary consulate in Lima.
- Peru has an embassy in Dublin.
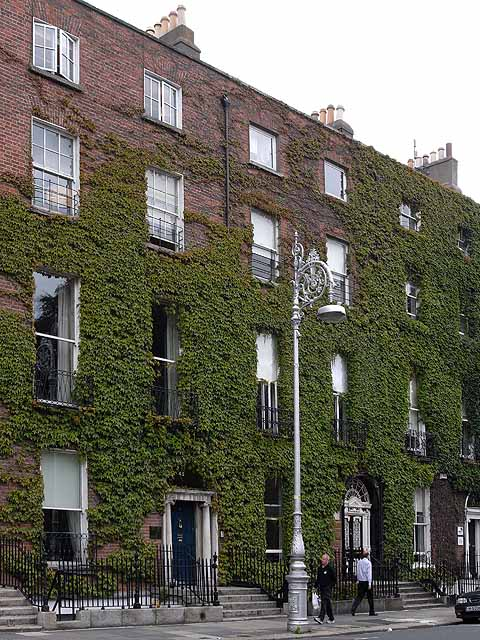
Embassy of Peru in Dublin

== See also ==
- Foreign relations of Ireland
- Foreign relations of Peru
- List of ambassadors of Peru to Ireland
- Peru–United Kingdom relations
