= Belgium–Peru relations =

- Belgium: Peru

Diplomatic mission
- Embassy of Belgium, Lima: Embassy of Peru, Brussels

Belgium–Peru relations refers to the bilateral relations between the Kingdom of Belgium and the Republic of Peru. Both countries are members of the United Nations.

Both countries established relations in the 19th century. Belgium has an embassy in Lima that is also accredited to Bolivia and Ecuador, and Peru has an embassy in Brussels also accredited to Luxembourg and the European Union.

Belgium is Peru's sixth commercial partner within the European Union and European investor mainly in the energy and transport sectors of the country. Both countries have also signed several bilateral agreements.

== History ==
Both countries established relations in the 19th century. During World War II, the Peruvian government appointed a chargé d’affaires (a.i.) to the Belgian government in exile in London, also accredited to other governments-in-exile such as those of Poland, the Netherlands, Czechoslovakia, Norway and Yugoslavia.

A Belgian humanitarian mission sponsored by the embassy arrived to Peru on January 22, 1965, focusing since then in working in the rural areas of Peru, building infrastructure and donating goods to local communities.

Belgium maintained an ambassadorial residence in the district of Jesús María until it moved to Barranco in 2021.

== High-level visits ==
High-level visits from Belgium to Peru

- Prime Minister Yves Leterme (2008)
- Princess Astrid of Belgium (2014)
- Foreign Minister Didier Reynders (2015 & 2017)
- Secretary General Dirk Achten (2017)

== Resident diplomatic missions ==
- Belgium has an embassy in Lima.
- Peru has an embassy in Brussels.

== See also ==
- List of ambassadors of Belgium to Peru
- List of ambassadors of Peru to Belgium
- Foreign relations of Belgium
- Foreign relations of Peru
