= List of ambassadors of Peru to Ireland =

Ambassador of Peru to Ireland
- Great Seal of Peru
- Ministry of Foreign Affairs
- Appointer: The president of Peru
- Inaugural holder: Gilbert Chauny de Porturas-Hoyle
- Formation: 2000
- Website: Embassy of Peru in Ireland

The extraordinary and plenipotentiary ambassador of Peru to Ireland is the official representative of the Republic of Peru to Ireland.

Relations between Peru and Ireland were established on June 27, 1999. Until 2017, the Peruvian ambassador in London was concurrent with Ireland. After the inauguration of a Peruvian embassy in September 2017, the Peruvian ambassador resides in Dublin.

== List of representatives ==
Name	Portrait	Term begin	Term end	President	Notes
Gilbert Chauny de Porturas-Hoyle		2000	2001	Alberto Fujimori	Ambassador; accredited from London.
Armando Lecaros de Cossío		2001	2003	Alejandro Toledo	Ambassador; accredited from London.
Luis Solari Tudela		October 6, 2004	July 27, 2006	Alejandro Toledo	Ambassador; accredited from London.
Ricardo Luna Mendoza		2006	2010	Alan García	Ambassador; accredited from London.
Hernán Couturier		2010	2012	Alan García	Ambassador; accredited from London.
Julio Muñoz Deacon		2012	2015	Ollanta Humala	Ambassador; accredited from London.
Claudio de la Puente Ribeyro		February 11, 2016	2017	Ollanta Humala	Ambassador; accredited from London.
Carmen Elena McEvoy Carreras		January 7, 2018	2019	Pedro Pablo Kuczynski	First resident ambassador in Dublin.
Ana María Sánchez de Ríos		April 1, 2020	2024	Martín Vizcarra	Ambassador.
Jaime Cacho-Sousa Velázquez		May 1, 2024	2026	Dina Boluarte	Ambassador

== See also ==
- List of ambassadors of Peru to the United Kingdom
