= Peru–Serbia relations =

- Peru: Serbia

Peru and Serbia maintain diplomatic relations established between Peru and the Kingdom of Yugoslavia before World War II, which were broken off in 1947 and renewed in 1967. From 1967 to 2006, Peru maintained relations with the Socialist Federal Republic of Yugoslavia (SFRY) and the Federal Republic of Yugoslavia (FRY) (later Serbia and Montenegro), of which Serbia is considered shared (SFRY) or sole (FRY) legal successor.

== History ==
Peru had relations with the Kingdom of Yugoslavia since the 1920s. During the World War II in Yugoslavia, Peru established economic and consular relations with the Yugoslav government-in-exile in 1942, and the consulate and embassy accredited to Peru were then located in Santiago de Chile. Relations continued after the war, with Josip Broz Tito visiting Peru in 1963, and were elevated to embassy level in 1967. A Yugoslav consulate opened in Lima, and a Peruvian embassy was opened in Belgrade.

After the breakup of Yugoslavia, Peru continued relations with the Federal Republic of Yugoslavia (Serbia and Montenegro) and its other successor states, such as Croatia in 1993. The Peruvian embassy in Belgrade closed in 2006, a couple of months after the independence of Montenegro, and the Peruvian Ambassador to Romania became accredited to Serbia until 2018, when the Peruvian Ambassador to Hungary became accredited instead after a series of reforms. On the other hand, the Serbian embassy's closure was announced and finalized in 2009, with the Serbian mission in Buenos Aires becoming accredited to Peru instead. In 2019, the Serbian government opened an honorary consulate in Lima.

Peru recognised Kosovo in 2008 after the latter declared its independence from Serbia. In relation to the announcement, Peru stressed that it wished to maintain its warm relations with Serbia, highlighting the work of Serbian company Energoprojekt in Peru. Nevertheless, the announcement led to controversy with the Serbian authorities, who recalled their ambassador for a couple of months. This event was the main reason for the closure of the Serbian embassy in Lima.

== High-level visits ==
- Foreign minister of Serbia and Montenegro, Goran Svilanović, (2003)
- Foreign minister of Serbia, Ivica Dačić, (2019)

== Economic relations ==
Trade between two countries amounted to $16 million in 2022; Peruvian merchandise export to Serbia were about $10 million; Serbian exports were standing at $6 million.

== Diplomatic missions ==
- Peru had an embassy in Belgrade until 2006 and is represented since through its embassy in Budapest (Hungary).
- Serbia had an embassy in Lima until 2009 and is represented since through its embassy in Buenos Aires (Argentina).

== See also ==
- Foreign relations of Peru
- Foreign relations of Serbia

== Bibliography ==
- Breña Alegre, Jeancarlo Giovanni (2017). Relaciones entre el Perú y los Países Balcánicos no miembros de la Unión Europea: Retos y Perspectivas (in Spanish). Academia Diplomática del Perú Javier Pérez de Cuéllar.
