= Austria–Peru relations =

- Austria: Peru

Diplomatic mission
- Embassy of Austria, Lima: Embassy of Peru, Vienna

Austria–Peru relations are the bilateral and diplomatic ties between the Republic of Austria and the Republic of Peru. The Austrian Ministry of Foreign Affairs describes relations between both countries as amicable, the largest community of Austrians are in Pozuzo and Oxapampa, located in the departament of Pasco.

== History ==
Both countries established relations in the 19th century. In 1851, Austria-Hungary recognized the independence of Peru, and both countries subsequently established relations. By 1859, ethnic Germans from Austria and Germany established and founded the colony of Pozuzo.

As a result of World War I, Peru severed relations with both Germany and Austria-Hungary, reestablishing them with the First Austrian Republic after the war. After the incorporation of Austria into the German Reich in 1938, Peru ceased to have relations with Austria, instead continuing its relations with Germany until 1942. During this period, the Austrian population in Peru saw itself polarized between Austrian loyalists and National Socialists.

In 1947, Peru recognized the Republic of Austria, and in 1949, bilateral relations were resumed, being elevated to embassy level in 1968.

== Resident diplomatic missions ==
- Austria has an embassy in Lima.
- Peru has an embassy in Vienna.
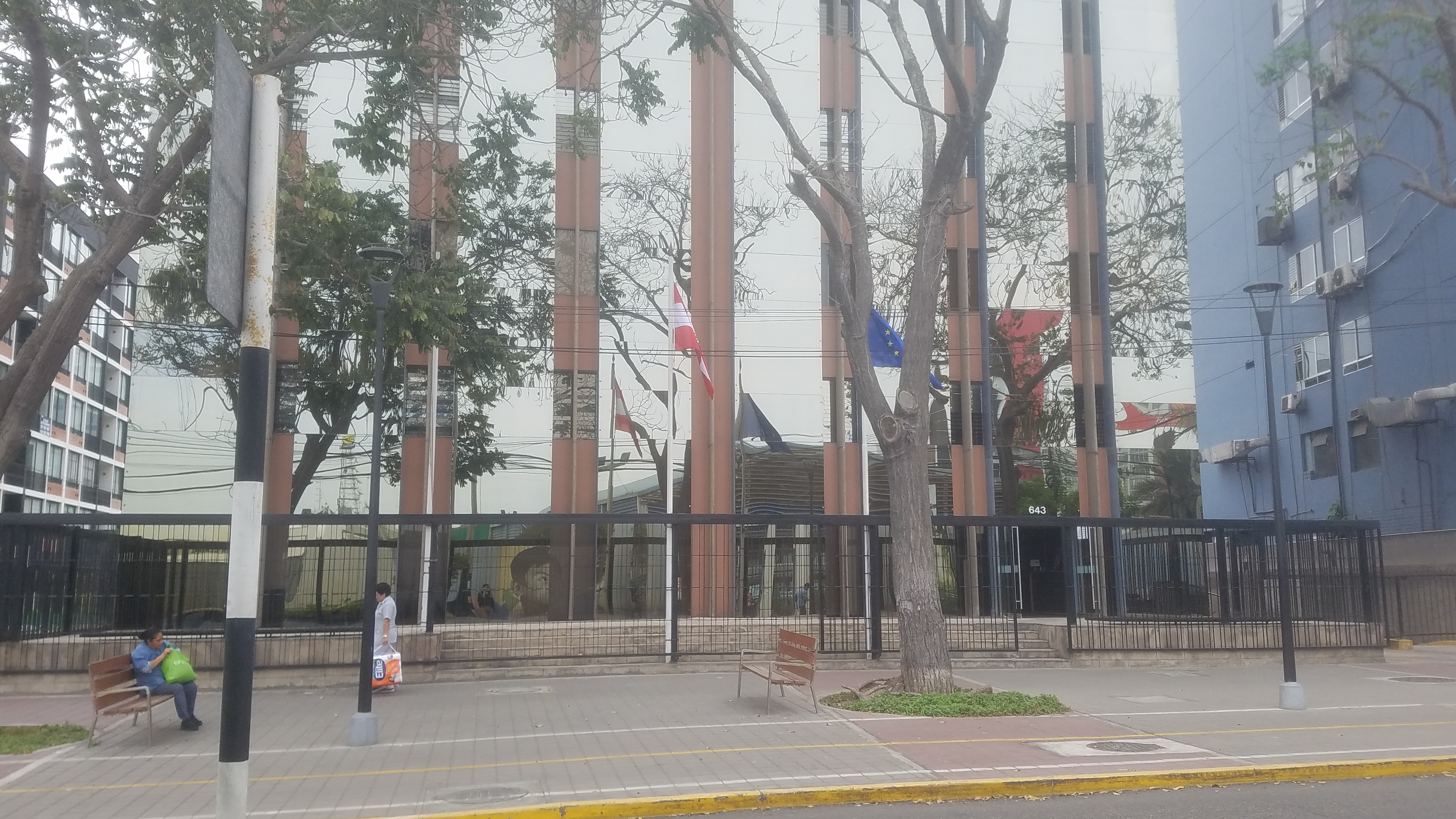
Austrian embassy in Lima

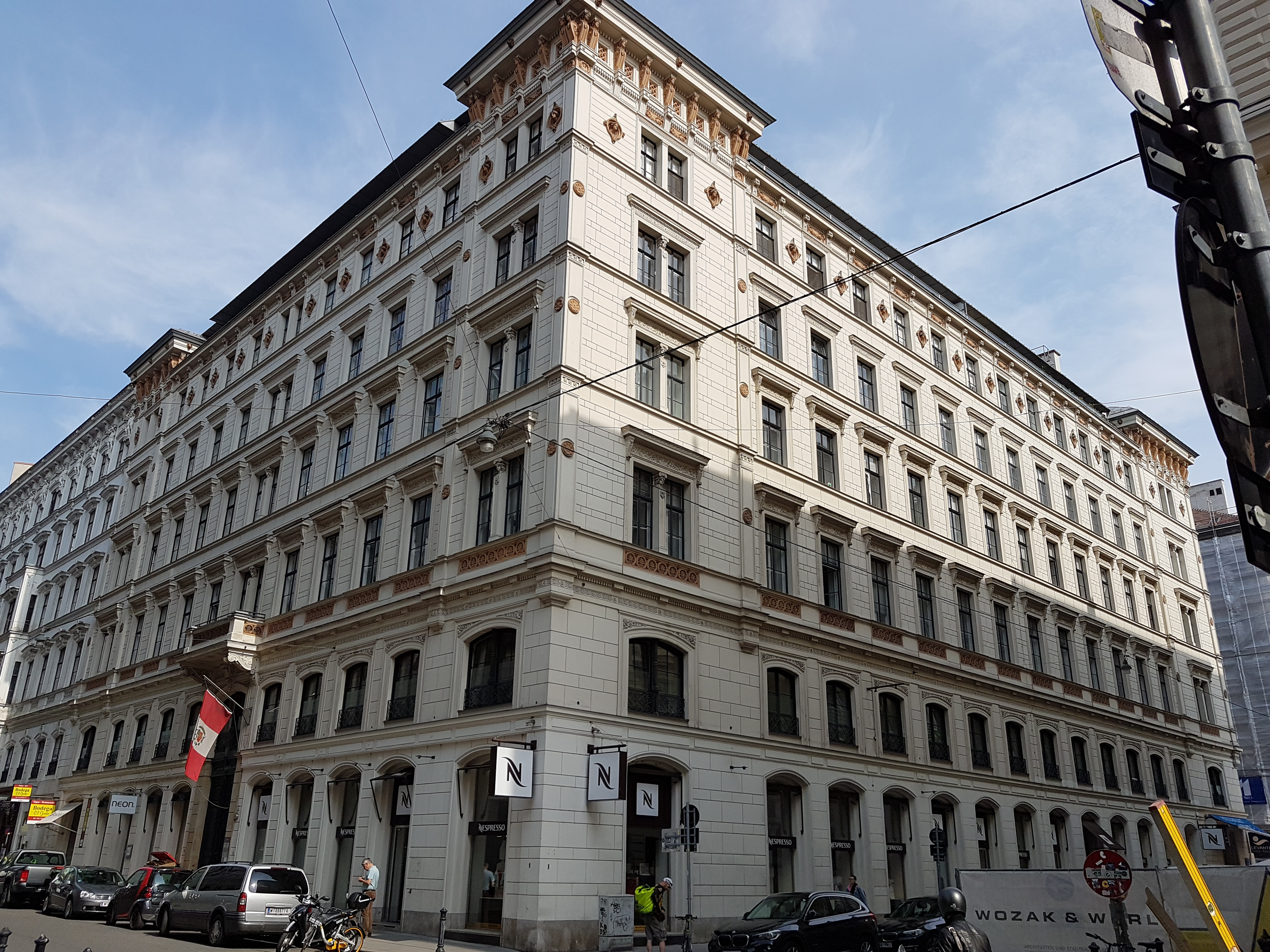
Building hosting the embassy of Peru in Vienna

== See also ==
- Foreign relations of Austria
- Foreign relations of Peru
- List of ambassadors of Austria to Peru
- List of ambassadors of Peru to Austria
