= Greece–Peru relations =

- Greece: Peru

Greece–Peru relations are the diplomatic and foreign relations of the Hellenic Republic and the Republic of Peru on 5 December 1965. Greece was represented in Peru by its embassy in Brazil until 1992, when the embassy in Lima was opened. Around 150-350 people of Greek descent live in Peru. Since 1987, Peru has an embassy in Athens.

== High level visits ==
The first official visit by a Greek official to Peru was made by the then Minister of Foreign Affairs George Papandreou in 2003.

Peruvian Governor Manuel Llempén Coronel visited Central Macedonia in 2022.

== Bilateral agreements ==
A number of agreements exist:

- Agreement on visa supretion for diplomatic passports (1986)
- Educational Agreement which was signed in Athens in 1988 (renewed in 2003)
- Agreement on tourism cooperation (1998)
- A Memorandum of Co-operation between the Ministries of Foreign Affairs of the two countries provides for the establishment of a mechanism of bilateral political consultations (in force since it was signed in Lima on 30 October 2003).

== See also ==
- Foreign relations of Greece
- Foreign relations of Peru
- List of ambassadors of Greece to Peru
- List of ambassadors of Peru to Greece
