= Georgia–Peru relations =

- Georgia: Peru

Georgia–Peru relations are the bilateral relations between Georgia and the Republic of Peru. Both countries are members of the United Nations and of the Pacific Alliance, with Georgia being an observer of the latter.

== History ==
Relations were formally established on January 14, 2010. Delegations from both countries visited Lima and Tbilisi in October and November of the same year, respectively, and the following year Georgian president Mikheil Saakashvili attended the inauguration of Peruvian president Ollanta Humala as part of an official visit. A cooperation agreement to strengthen competition policies was signed in 2018.

Peru opened an embassy in Azerbaijan on August 2, 2017, that was concurrent with Georgia. After it closed in 2020, the embassy in Turkey became accredited again. An honorary consulate was ultimately opened in Tbilisi on August 23, 2018.

=== Subnational relations ===
After the Russo-Georgian War in August 2008, the Russian government started a diplomatic campaign aimed at the international recognition of Abkhazia and South Ossetia, whose independence was consolidated by the conflict. Regarding Peru, the Russian press and Peruvian opposition drew parallels with the country's recognition of Kosovo's declaration of independence from Serbia on February 22 of the same year.

In 2009, the leader of the Peruvian Nationalist Party, Ollanta Humala, submitted a motion to the Peruvian Congress to diplomatically recognise the disputed countries. The issue was ultimately not discussed, with the territorial integrity of Georgia (with whom relations had not yet been established) being implicitly recognised by Peru instead, as the country has consistently abstained to vote on the issue at the United Nations General Assembly except for one case where a vote in favour was cast regarding cooperation with Georgia regarding the humanitarian situation in both regions.

== High-level visits ==
High-level visits from Georgia to Peru

- President Mikheil Saakashvili (2011)

== Trade ==
In 2021, Georgian exports were valued at US$ 13,9 million, while imports were valued at US$500 thousand. In comparison, Georgian exports and imports were valued at US$2,2 million in 2012.

== Diplomatic missions ==
- Georgia is accredited to Peru from its embassy in Brasília.
- Peru is accredited to Georgia from its embassy in Ankara and has an honorary consulate in Tbilisi.

== See also ==
- Foreign relations of Georgia
- Foreign relations of Peru
- List of ambassadors of Georgia to Peru
- List of ambassadors of Peru to Georgia
