= Peru–Romania relations =

- Peru: Romania

Diplomatic mission
- Embassy of Peru, Bucharest: Embassy of Romania, Lima

Peru–Romania relations refers to the bilateral relations between Peru and Romania. Both countries are members of the United Nations.

== History ==
Both countries formally established relations on October 10, 1939. Peru severed its relations with the Kingdom of Romania as a result of World War II, but reestablished them at en embassy level with the Socialist Republic of Romania on November 9, 1968, after the 1968 Peruvian coup d'état and the establishment of Juan Velasco Alvarado's Revolutionary Government. Under Velasco Alvarado's tenure, Peru pursued closer relations with Romania and the rest of the Soviet bloc.

The chargé d'affaires of the Romanian embassy in Lima was one of the initial hostages of the Japanese embassy hostage crisis of 1996.

Peru has an embassy in Bucharest. It closed in 1991, but reopened on August 4, 1994. The ambassador to Romania was accredited to Serbia until 2018.

In 2013, Romanian president Traian Băsescu made an official visit to Peru, where he met with Peruvian president Ollanta Humala.

== High-level visits ==
High-level visits from Romania to Peru

- President Nicolae Ceaușescu and First Lady Elena Ceaușescu (1973)
- President Traian Băsescu (2013)
- Foreign Minister Titus Corlățean (2014)

== Trade ==
A Peruvian-Romanian chamber of commerce promotes trade between both countries. In 2021, Peruvian exports to Romania were valued at US$ 14,8 million, while Romanian exports were valued at US$ 20,1 million.

== Diaspora ==
A community of Romanians described as "considerably large" lives in Peru. During the 1970s to 1980s, a large number of Peruvians studied abroad in Romania thanks to the scholarships granted by the socialist government.

== Resident diplomatic missions ==
- Peru has an embassy in Bucharest.
- Romania has an embassy in Lima.

== See also ==
- Foreign relations of Peru
- Foreign relations of Romania
- List of ambassadors of Peru to Romania
- List of ambassadors of Romania to Peru
