= Delegation of the European Union to Peru =

Diplomatic mission of the European Union to Peru

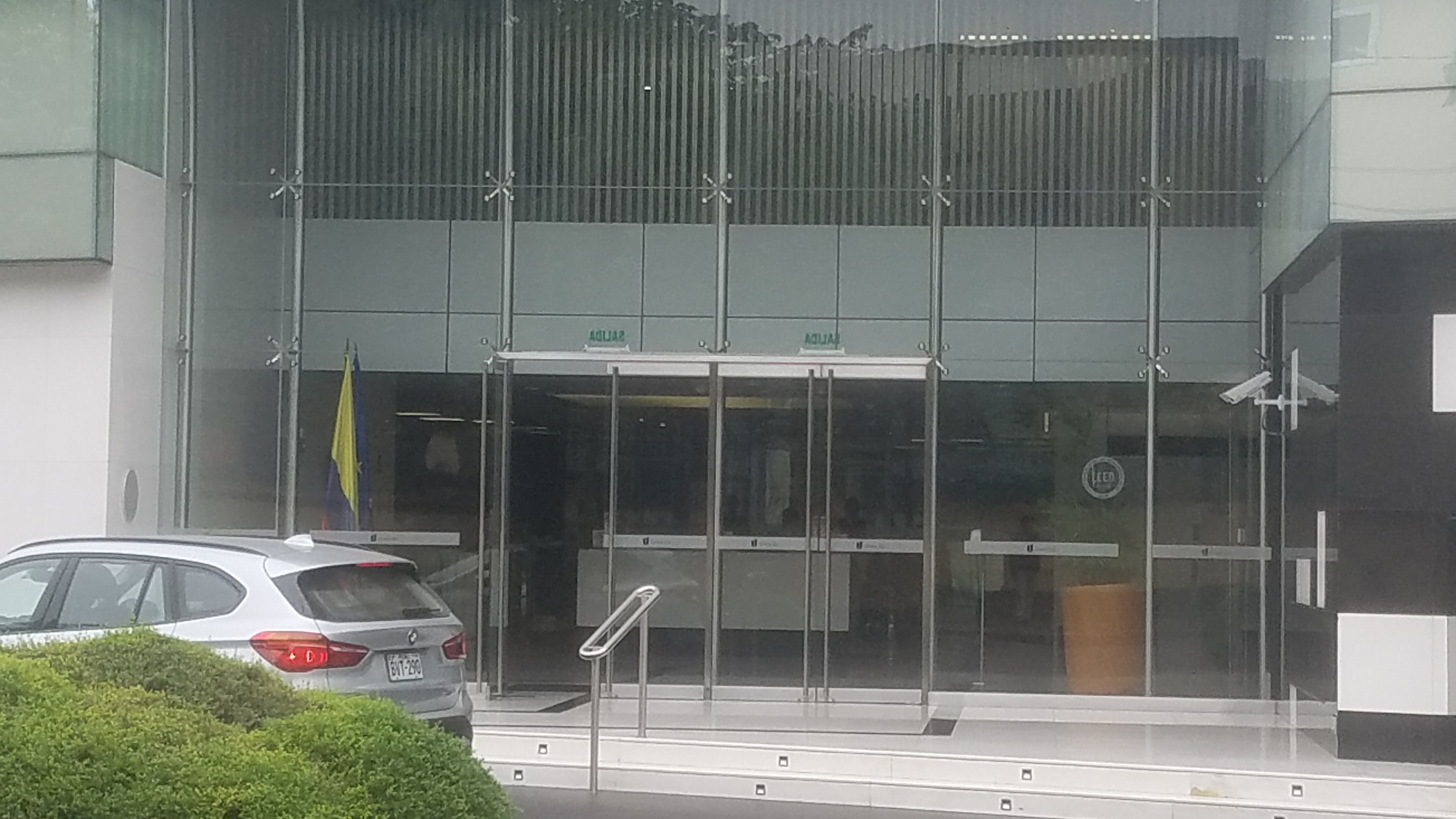
- Location: San Isidro District, Lima
- Address: Víctor Andrés Belaúnde 340
- Opened: March 1991
- Relocated: 2016
- Ambassador: Jonathan Hatwell
- Website: Official website

The Delegation of the European Union in Lima represents the permanent diplomatic mission of the European Commission, the primary executive arm of the European Union (EU), in Peru. The delegation also serves as a link between the EU and the Andean Community.

It is located at the fifth floor of the Edificio Cromo 332, an office building located at 340 Víctor Andrés Belaúnde Avenue, in central San Isidro District, Lima. The building is shared with the Embassy of Colombia.

Since 2021, the current representative of the EU is Irish citizen Jonathan Hatwell.

== History ==
The delegation of what was then the European Economic Community in Lima opened in March 1991. It was concurrently accredited to Bolivia until 1995, when a delegation opened in La Paz. Despite the presence of the delegation, bilateral relations between both entities were formally established in 2000.

The delegation was previously housed at 165 Pasaje Alberto Lynch, in San Isidro District, Lima, after which it operated at its own building in Comandante Espinar Avenue 719, which was eventually demolished in 2016.

It is currently housed at the fifth floor of the Edificio Cromo 332, a seven-storey LEED-certified building that also houses the Embassy of Colombia in Lima.

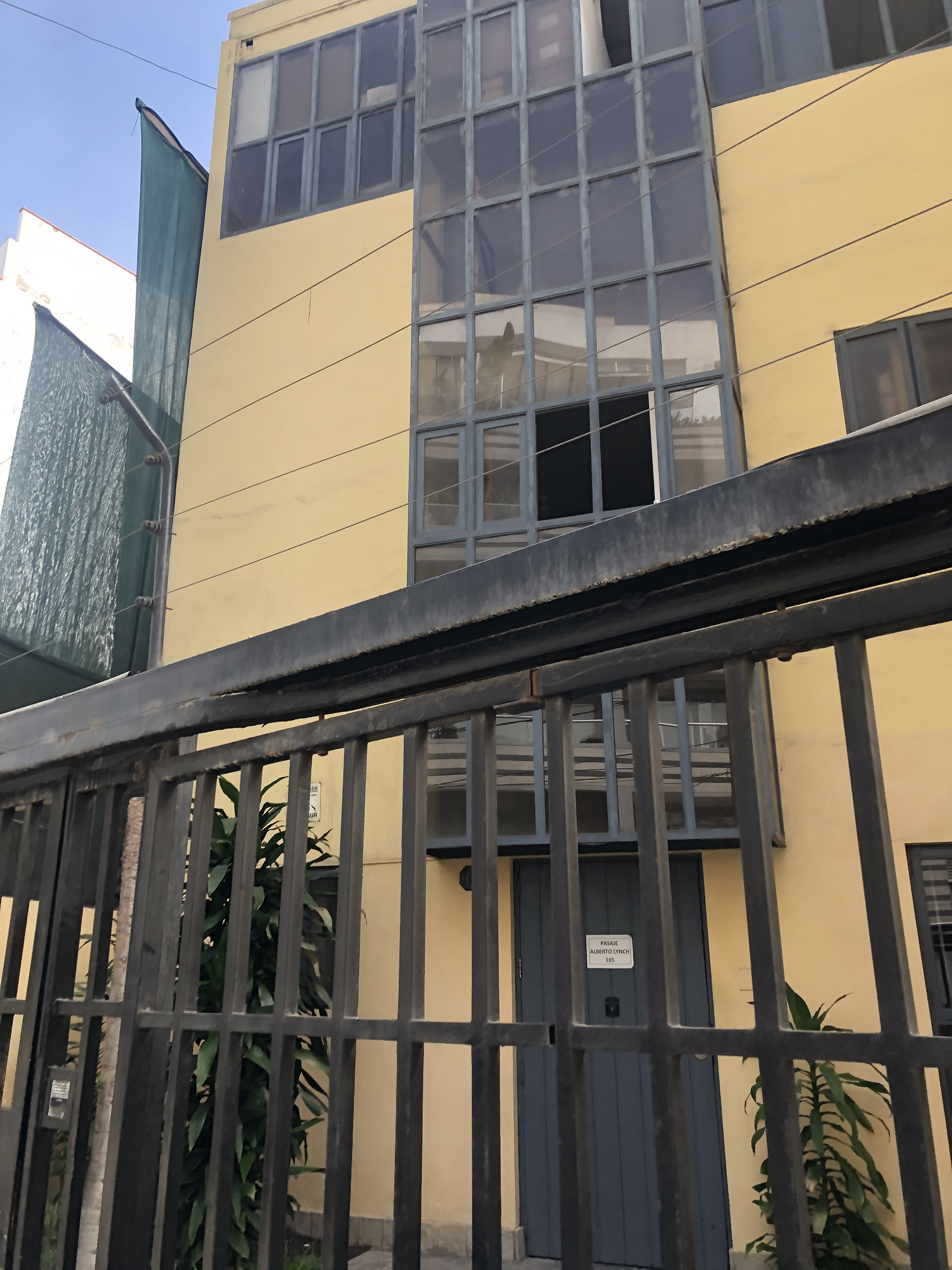
Former location in San Isidro

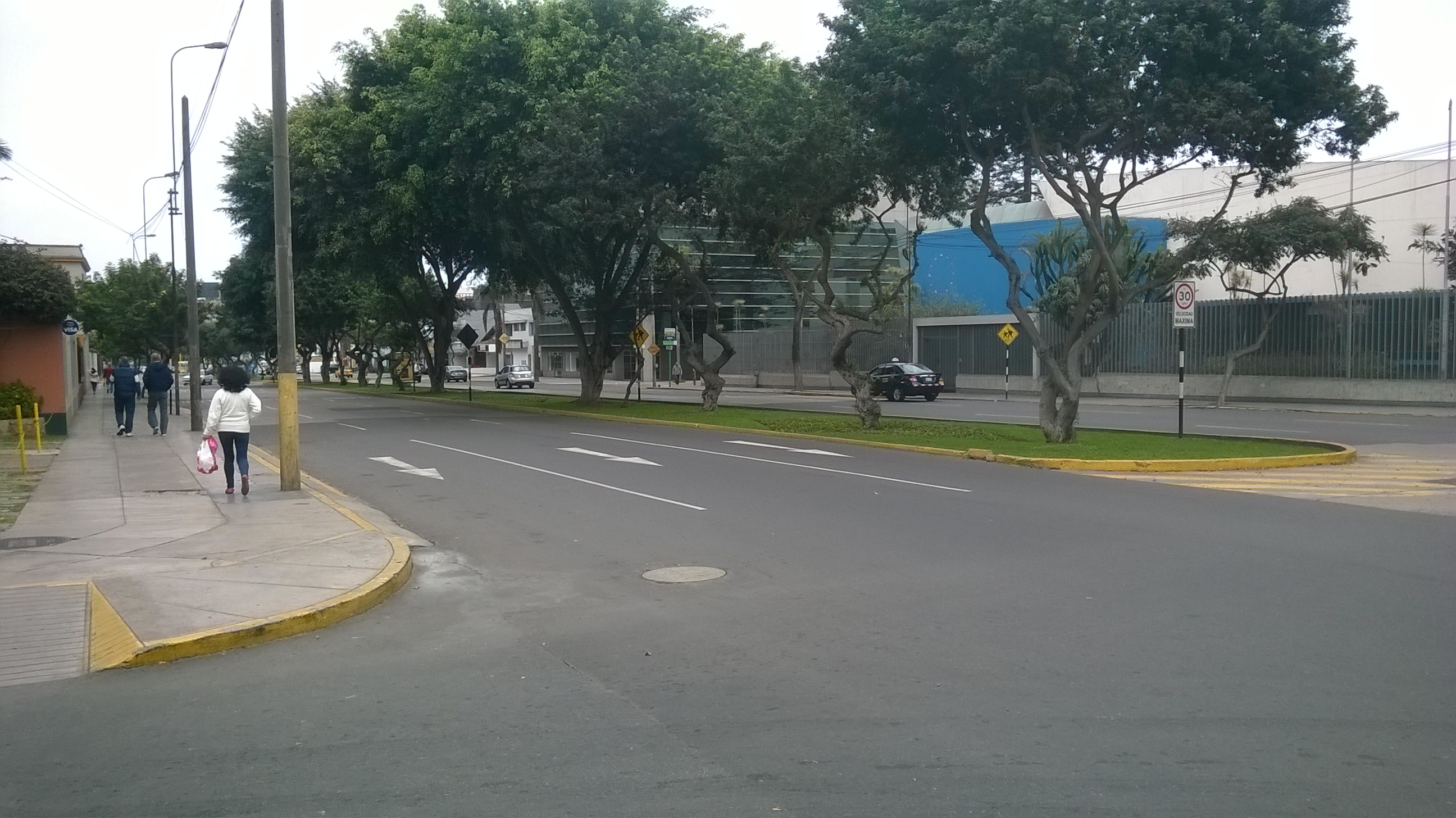
Former location in Miraflores

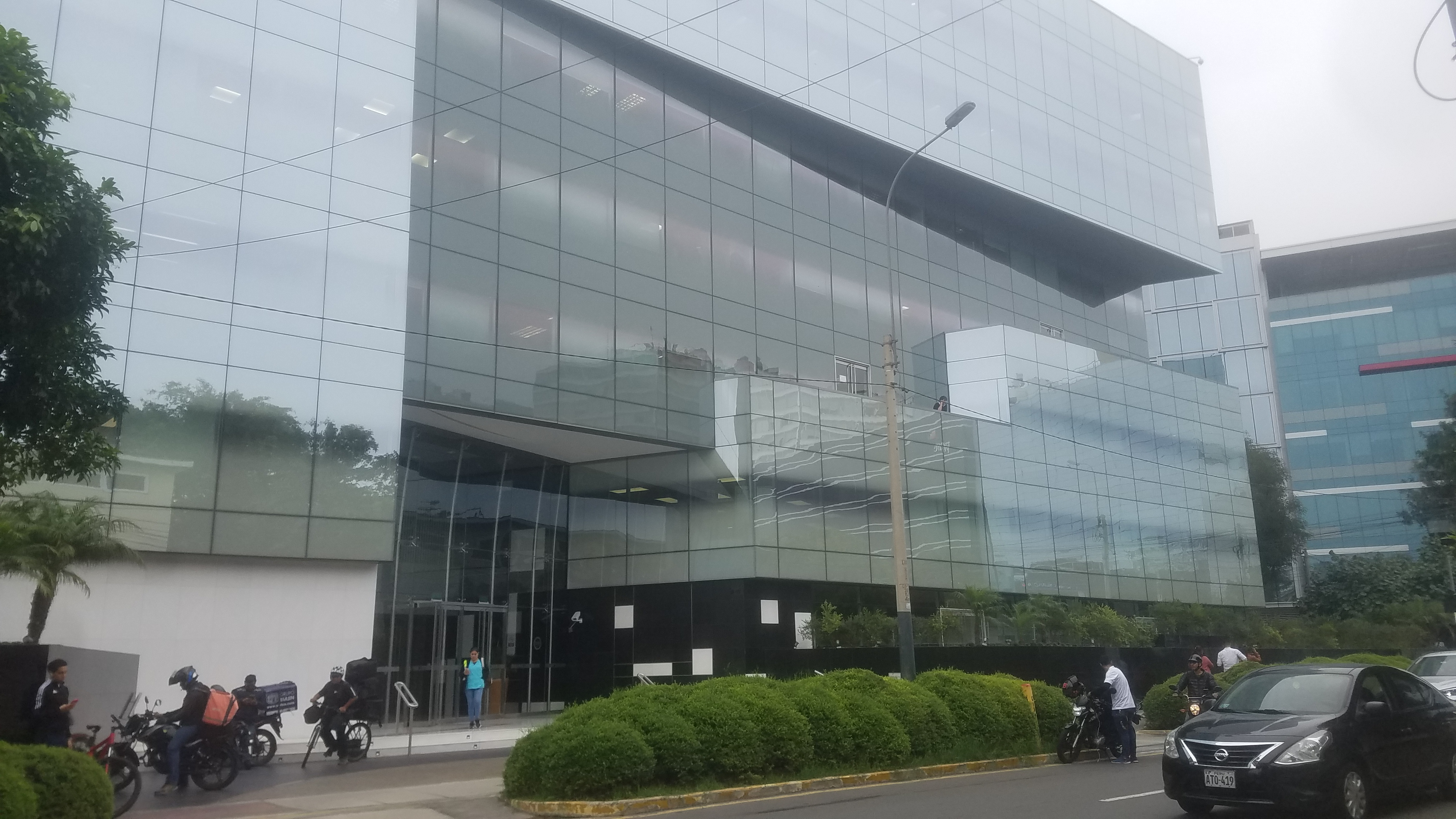
Current location in San Isidro

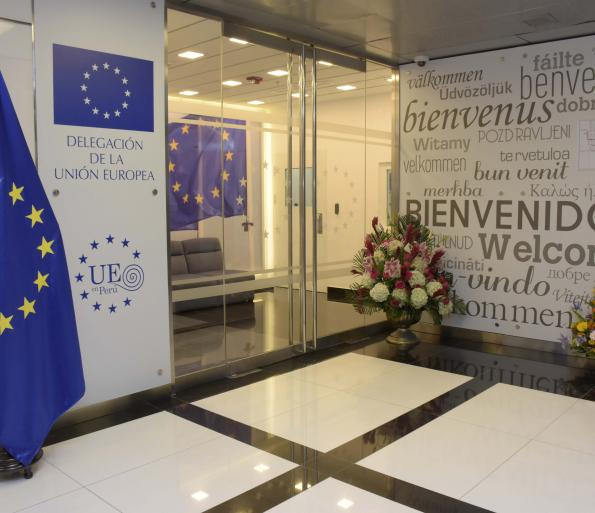
Ditto, interior

=== Residence ===
The ambassador's residence is located at Pezet 515, a building next to Lima Golf Club designed by Austrian architect Hans Hollein and built from 2006 to 2011.

== List of representatives ==
The Head of Delegation of the European Union in Lima is the official representative of the European Commission to the Government of Peru.

Name (and country)	Portrait	Term begin	Term end	President	Notes
(Italy) Sabato Della Monica		March 1991	1996	Jacques Delors	First representative; also accredited to Bolivia until 1995.
(France) Jean-Michel Pérille		1997	2001	Jacques Santer	
(Germany) Mendel Goldstein		2001	September 2005	Romano Prodi	
(Portugal) Antonio Cardoso Mota		2005	October 2009	José Manuel Barroso	
(Sweden) Hans Allden		2010	2013	José Manuel Barroso	Allden presented his credentials on January 15.
(Austria) Irene Horejs		2013	2017	José Manuel Barroso	Horejs presented her credentials on November 7.
(Spain) Diego Mellado		2017	2021	Jean-Claude Juncker	
(Spain) Gaspar Frontini		September 2021	2024	Ursula von der Leyen	Frontini presented his credentials on October 7.
(Republic of Ireland) Jonathan Hatwell		2024	Incumbent	Ursula von der Leyen	Hatwell presented his credentials on October 2.

== See also ==
- European Union–Peru relations
- List of ambassadors of Peru to the European Union
