= Embassy of Serbia, Lima =

Former Yugoslav and later Serbian diplomatic mission to Peru

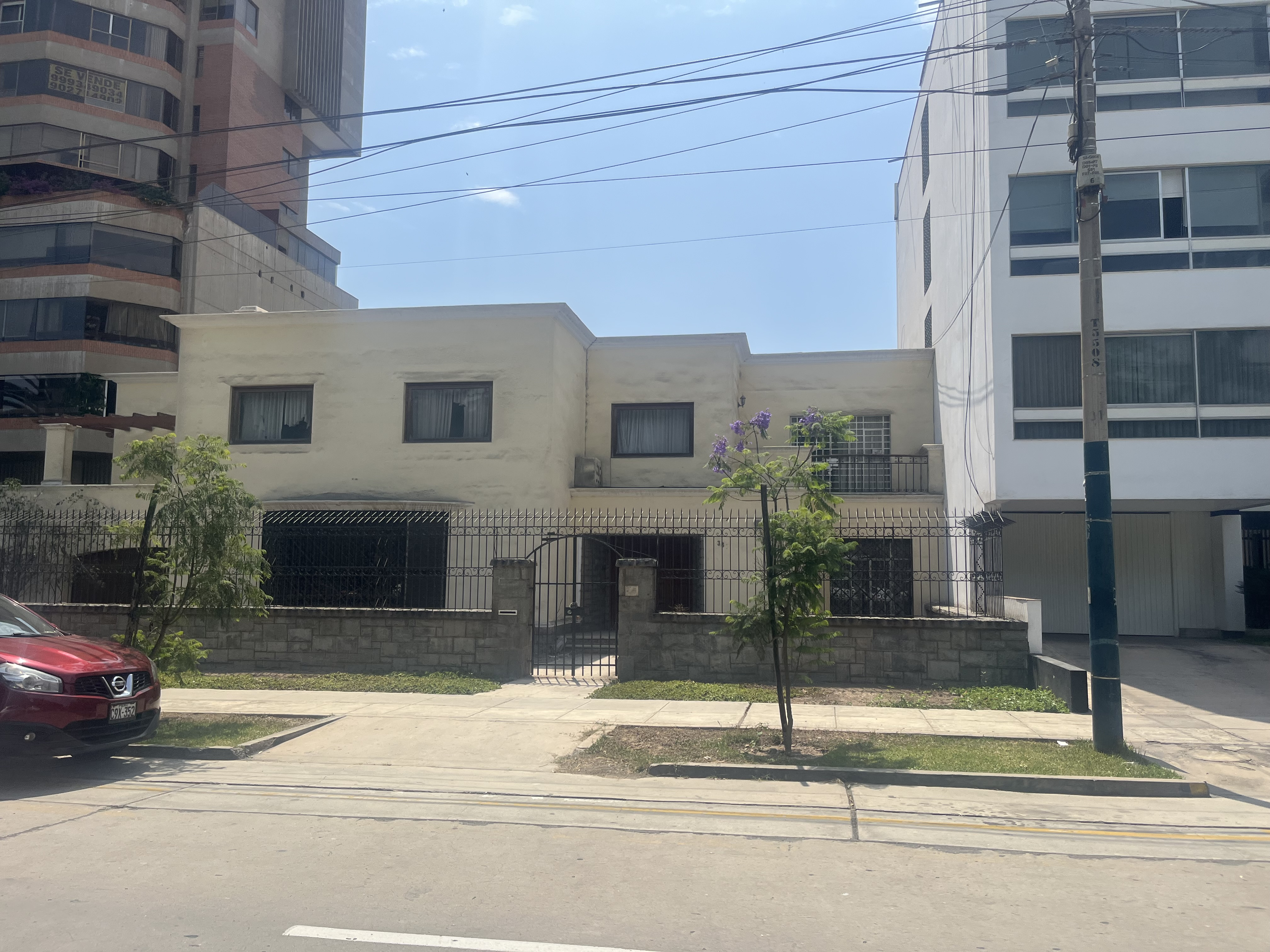
- Former embassy building in 2026
- Location: San Isidro, Lima, Peru
- Address: Carlos Porras Osores 360 (Note: The embassy's address was Carlos Porras Osores 360, while the ambassador's residence's address was Jr. Los Cibeles 110, also located in San Isidro.)
- Opened: 1968
- Closed: 2009

The Embassy of Serbia in Lima (Serbian: Амбасада Србије у Лими; Spanish: Embajada de la República de Serbia en Lima) was the diplomatic mission of Serbia to Peru. From its establishment in 1968 until 2006, the embassy represented the Socialist Federal Republic of Yugoslavia and its successor, the Federal Republic of Yugoslavia. Its closure was announced in May 2009.

Serbia is currently accredited to Peru from its embassy in Buenos Aires. An honorary consulate opened in Lima in July 2019.

== History ==
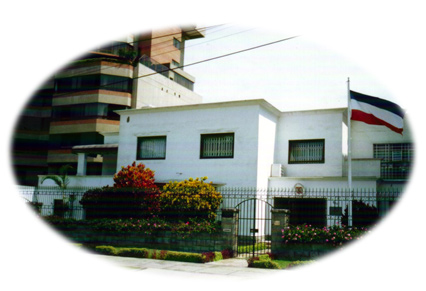
The Yugoslav embassy in the early 2000s.

Relations between Peru and the then Kingdom of Yugoslavia date back to the 1920s, as the latter had established an honorary consulate in Lima, and the former had consulates in Belgrade and Zagreb by 1929. The former also had a Croat minority present in the city's capital, Callao and Cerro de Pasco, represented by the Yugoslav Society in central Lima. During World War II, Peru established economic and consular relations with the Yugoslav government-in-exile in October 1942. The consulate and embassy accredited to Peru were then located in Santiago de Chile.

After Juan Velasco Alvarado's coup d'état against Fernando Belaúnde and the establishment of his so-called revolutionary government, Peru reestablished relations with the countries of the second world, including the Socialist Federal Republic of Yugoslavia in 1967. Thus, the Yugoslav consulate was opened in Lima, replacing the honorary consulate. Relations were then upgraded to embassy level on December of the following year, and the Yugoslav ambassador presented his credentials on January 9, 1971.

During the internal conflict in Peru, due to the region's support of the Peruvian government and lack of support for the terror group, embassies of the Eastern Bloc were attacked by the Shining Path on several occasions, such as in 1986, when the Soviet embassy was attacked, or in 1987, when the North Korean embassy was bombed. The Yugoslav embassy was not spared from the conflict either, as it was also the target of an unsuccessful bombing on September 4, 1981.

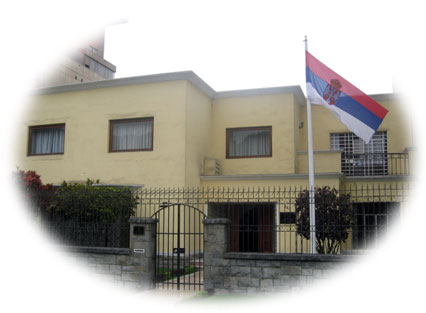
The embassy in 2007, now Serbian.

After the breakup of Yugoslavia, Peru continued relations with the Federal Republic of Yugoslavia (FRY), later Serbia and Montenegro, and its other successor states. After Montenegro declared its independence following a referendum, Serbia followed suit soon after. While relations continued with now-independent Montenegro, the new Serbian state took over the chancery.

The Peruvian embassy in Belgrade closed in 2006, instead accrediting its ambassadors in the former country's neighbouring regions to the successor states of Yugoslavia. On the other hand, the Serbian embassy's closure was announced and finalized in 2009, with the Serbian mission in Buenos Aires becoming accredited to Peru instead. The Peruvian recognition of the independence of Kosovo was the main reason for the closure.

== List of representatives ==
Name	Term begin	Term end	Head of state	Notes
Kole Čašule	January 9, 1971	1975	Josip Broz Tito	First Yugoslav ambassador to Peru.
Kuzmán Dimčevski	1975	1983	Josip Broz Tito	As ambassador.
Luka Soldić	1975	1983	Josip Broz Tito	As ambassador.
Alija Vejacić	1983	1986	Mika Špiljak	As ambassador.
Ladislav Varga	1986	1990	Radovan Vlajković	As ambassador.
Zvonimir Stenek	1991	?	Borisav Jović	As ambassador.
Zoran Raičević	before 1999	after 1999	Slobodan Milošević	As chargé d'affaires.
Milivoj Sucevic	before 2002	October 12, 2004	Vojislav Koštunica	As chargé d'affaires (a.i.).
Goran Mešić	October 12, 2004	2009	Svetozar Marović	As ambassador.

== See also ==
- Embassy of China, Lima
- Embassy of Russia, Lima

== Bibliography ==
- Breña Alegre, Jeancarlo Giovanni (2017). Relaciones entre el Perú y los Países Balcánicos no miembros de la Unión Europea: Retos y Perspectivas (in Spanish). Academia Diplomática del Perú Javier Pérez de Cuéllar.
- Burin, Marko (2009). La familia croata en el Peru (in Spanish). Marko Burin. ISBN 9789972339950.
