= List of diplomatic training institutions =

This is an alphabetical list of diplomatic training institutions.

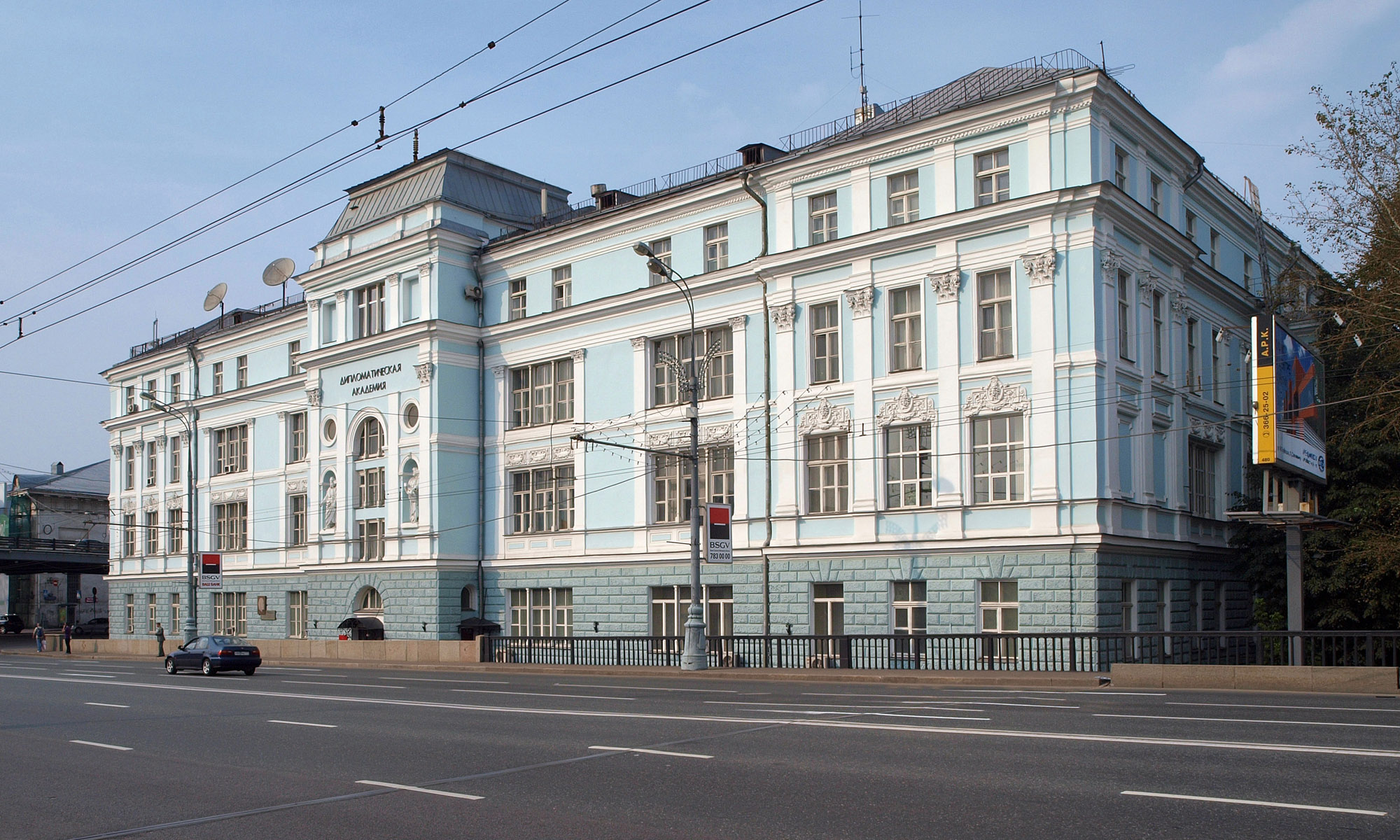
The Diplomatic Academy of the Ministry of Foreign Affairs of the Russian Federation at 53/2 Ostozhenka Street in Moscow.

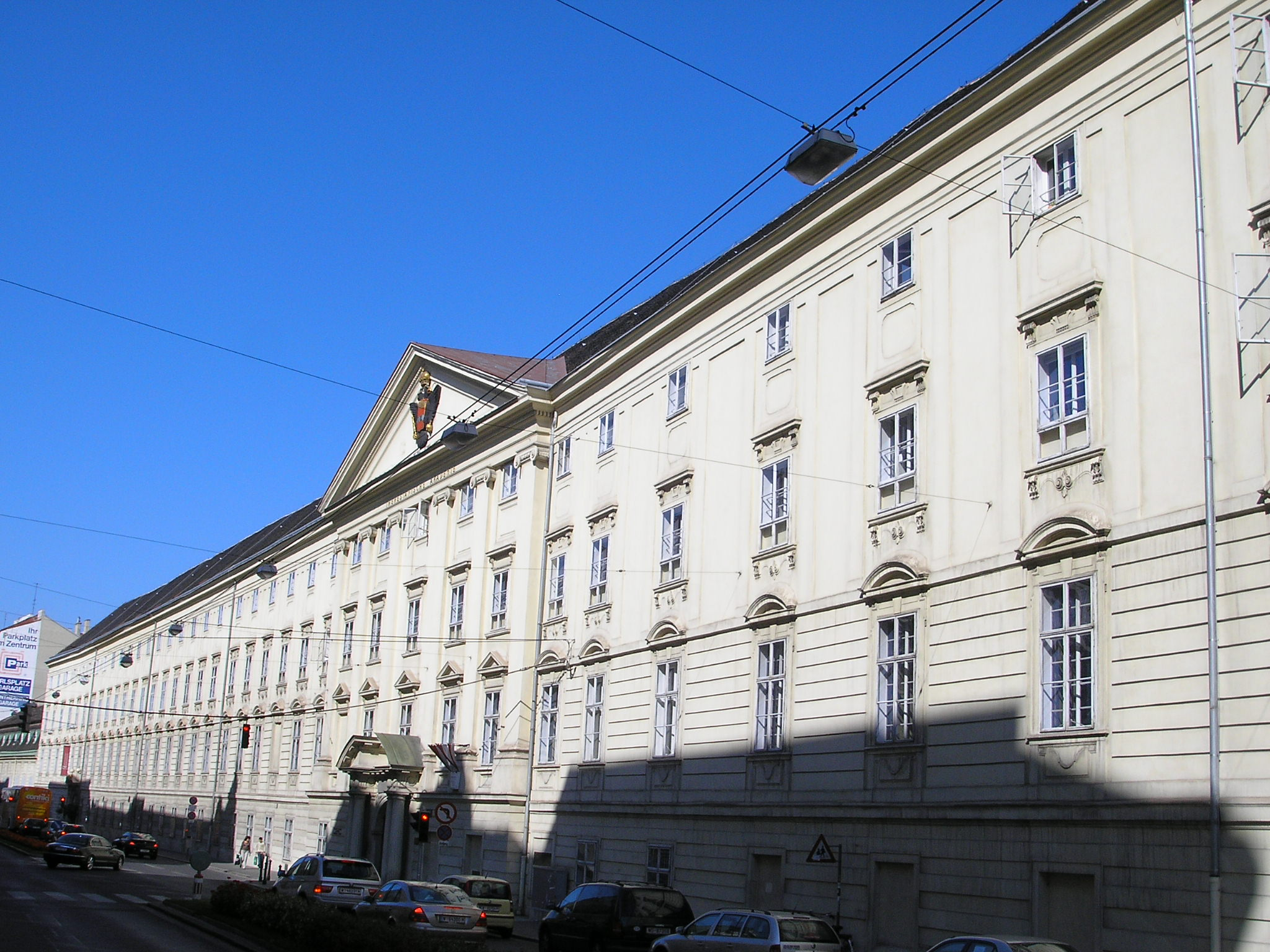
Front side of the Diplomatic Academy of Vienna

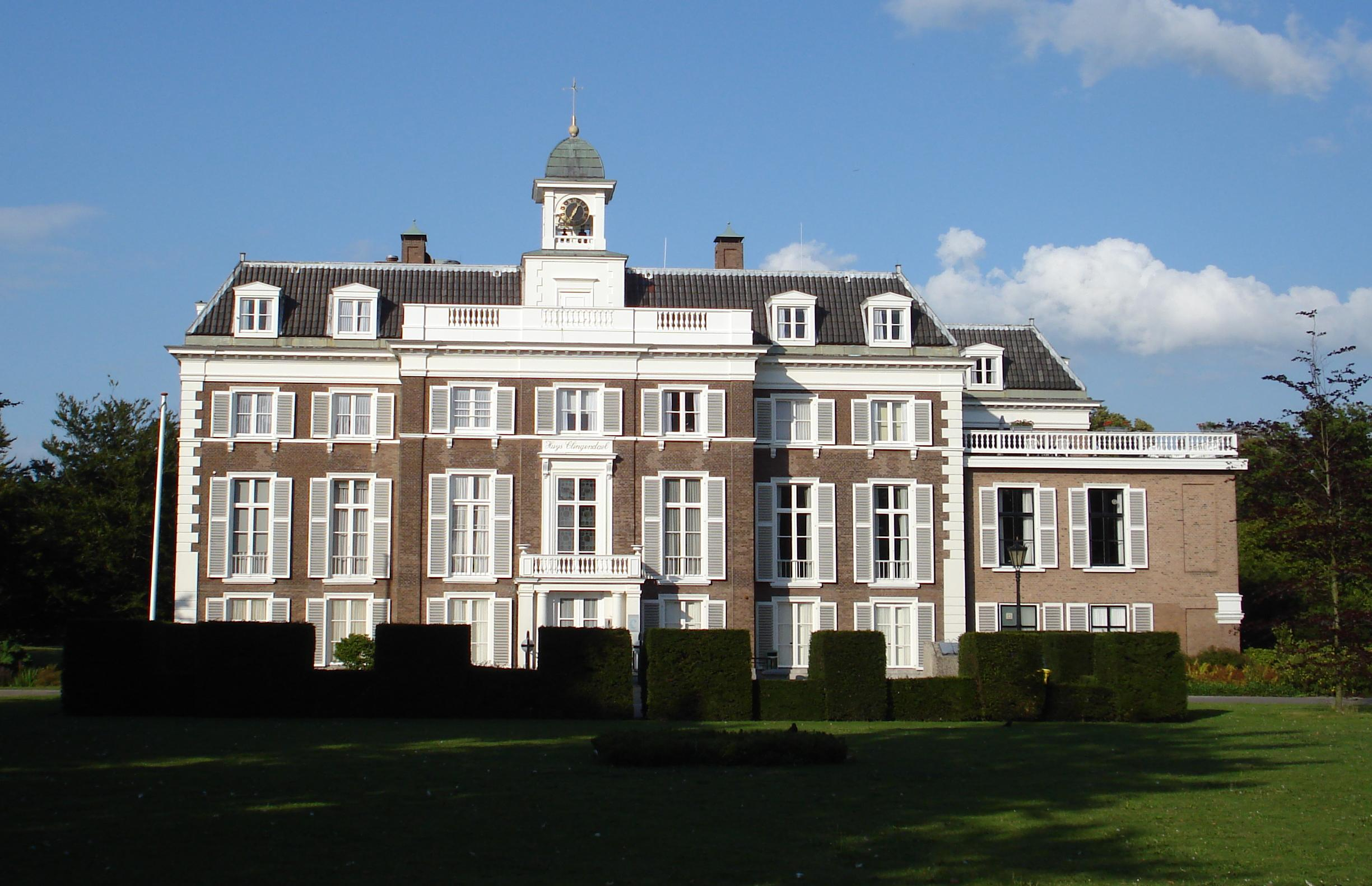
The Netherlands Institute of International Relations Clingendael, in The Hague.

- Academia Diplomática de Chile Andrés Bello, Santiago, Chile
- Academia Diplomática del Ecuador Galo Plaza Lasso, Quito, Ecuador
- Academia Diplomática de Nicaragua José de Marcoleta, Managua Nicaragua
- Academia Diplomática del Peru Javier Pérez de Cuéllar, Lima, Perú
- Asia Pacific College of Diplomacy, The Australia National University, Canberra, Australia
- Ateneo de Manila University, Philippines
- Azerbaijan Diplomatic Academy, Baku, Azerbaijan
- Bahrain's Diplomatic Institute, Manama, Bahrain
- Balsillie School of International Affairs, Canada
- Bandaranaike International Diplomatic Training Institute, Colombo, Sri Lanka
- Consular and Diplomatic Service University (CDSU)
- Centre for International Studies and Diplomacy, School of Oriental and African Studies, University of London, UK
- Centre for Politics and Diplomatic Studies, University of Leicester, UK
- College of Europe
- De La Salle - College of Saint Benilde
- DiploFoundation, Malta
- Diplomatic Institute, Israel
- Diplomacy Academy, Turkey
- Diplomatic Academy of the Ministry of Foreign Affairs of the Russian Federation
- Diplomatic Academy, Hellenic Ministry of Foreign Affairs, Athens
- Diplomatic Academy of Vienna
- Diplomatic Institute of Paris, Washington, DC
- Edelstam Institute of Education for Human Rights and International Affairs
- Edmund A. Walsh School of Foreign Service, Georgetown University, Washington, DC
- Elliott School of International Affairs, George Washington University, Washington, DC
- Escuela Diplomática de España, Spain
- Fletcher School of Law and Diplomacy, Tufts University, Medford, Massachusetts
- Foreign Service Academy, Bangladesh
- Foreign Service Academy, Pakistan
- Foreign Service Institute India
- Foreign Service Institute of the Philippines
- Foreign Service Institute, George P. Shultz National Foreign Affairs Training Center, Arlington, Virginia
- Foreign Service Training Institute, Sagamihara, Japan
- Helena Z Benitez School of International Relations and Diplomacy, Philippine Women's University
- Institute for European Business Administration, Belgium
- Institute of Diplomacy & Foreign Relations (IDFR), Kuala Lumpur, Malaysia
- Institute of Strategic Relationship Management, Den Haag, Netherlands
- Institute of Diplomatic Studies, Cairo, Egypt
- Instituto de Educación Superior en Formación Diplomática y Consular "Dr. Eduardo Latorre Rodríguez" -INESDYC- of Dominican Republic
- Instituto del Servicio Exterior de la Nación, Argentina
- Instituto del Servicio Exterior "Manuel Maria de Peralta" – Diplomatic Academy of Costa Rica
- Instituto Matías Romero, Mexico City
- International Academy, Foreign, Commonwealth and Development Office, United Kingdom
- International School of Protocol & Diplomacy, Brussels, Belgium
- Istituto Diplomatico - Ministry of Foreign Affairs of Italy
- Josef Korbel School of International Studies, University of Denver, Denver, Colorado, USA
- Kofi Annan Peace Keeping Training Centre - Accra, Ghana
- Kuwait Diplomatic Institute (KDI)
- Lancaster University, Department of Politics, Philosophy and Religion
- Legon Centre for International Affairs and Diplomacy (LECIAD) University of Ghana, Legon
- Lyceum of the Philippines University-Cavite, Department of Foreign Service, Governors Drive, Manggahan, General Trias, Cavite, Philippines
- Luiss University, Rome, Italy
- Maxwell School of Citizenship and Public Affairs
- Mediterranean Academy of Diplomatic Studies (MEDAC), Malta
- Moscow State Institute of International Relations
- Mozambique-Tanzania Centre For Foreign Relations Dar es Salaam
- National Korean Diplomatic Agency, Seoul, Korea
- Institute of Diplomacy and International Affairs, Taipei, Taiwan
- Netherlands Institute of International Relations Clingendael
- Norman Paterson School of International Affairs, Carleton University, Ottawa, Canada
- Oxford University Diplomatic Studies Programme
- Paris School of International Affaires (PSIA), Institut d'études politiques de Paris (Sciences Po), France
- Patterson School of Diplomacy and International Commerce, University of Kentucky, Lexington, Kentucky
- Paul H. Nitze School of Advanced International Studies, Johns Hopkins University, Baltimore, Maryland
- Peruvian Diplomatic Academy, Lima, Peru
- Pontifical Ecclesiastical Academy, Rome
- Prince Saud Al Faisal Institute of Diplomatic Studies, Riyadh
- Protocolbureau, Den Haag, Netherlands
- Rio Branco Institute, the diplomatic academy of the Ministry of External Relations of Brazil
- Royal United Services Institute
- School of International and Public Affairs, Columbia University (SIPA), New York City, NY
- School of International Service, American University, Washington, DC
- The Diplomatic Academy of the Caribbean, Trinidad and Tobago
- USC School of International Relations, Los Angeles, California, U.S.A.
- United Nations International School
- United Nations International School of Hanoi
- United Nations Institute for Training and Research (UNITAR), Geneva, Switzerland, and New York, New York
- University of International Relations, Beijing, China
- University for Peace
- US Institute of Diplomacy and Human Rights, Washington, D.C.
- School of Diplomacy and International Relations, Seton Hall University, South Orange, New Jersey
- Woodrow Wilson School of Public and International Affairs, Princeton University, New Jersey
- Zimbabwe Institute of Diplomacy, Julius Nyerere House, Belgravia, Harare
