= List of ambassadors of the United Arab Emirates to Peru =

Ambassador of United Arab Emirates to the Republic of Peru
- Coat of Arms of the UAE
- Incumbent; Khaled Ali Mohammed Binsalem Alnuaimi since January 7, 2023
- Ministry of Foreign Affairs
- Style: His Excellency
- Inaugural holder: Mohammad Youssef Mohammad Alawadi
- Formation: 2016

The Emirati ambassador in Lima is the official representative of the government in Abu Dhabi to the government of the Republic of Peru.

== List of representatives ==
Diplomatic accreditation	Ambassador	Observations	Emirati president	President of Peru	Term end
2016	Mohammad Youssef Mohammad Alawadi (محمد يوسف محمد العوضي)	First ambassador to Peru. Credentials presented on April 5, 2016.	Khalifa bin Zayed Al Nahyan	Ollanta Humala	2019
2020	Mohamed Abdulla Ali Khater Alshamsi (محمد عبدالله علي خاطر الشامسي)	Credentials presented on October 7, 2021.	Khalifa bin Zayed Al Nahyan	Martín Vizcarra	2022
January 7, 2023	Khaled Ali Mohammed Binsalem Alnuaimi	Credentials presented on January 7, 2023.	Mohamed bin Zayed Al Nahyan	Dina Boluarte	Incumbent

== See also ==
- Peru–United Arab Emirates relations
- List of consuls-general of Peru in Dubai
