= Peru–Qatar relations =

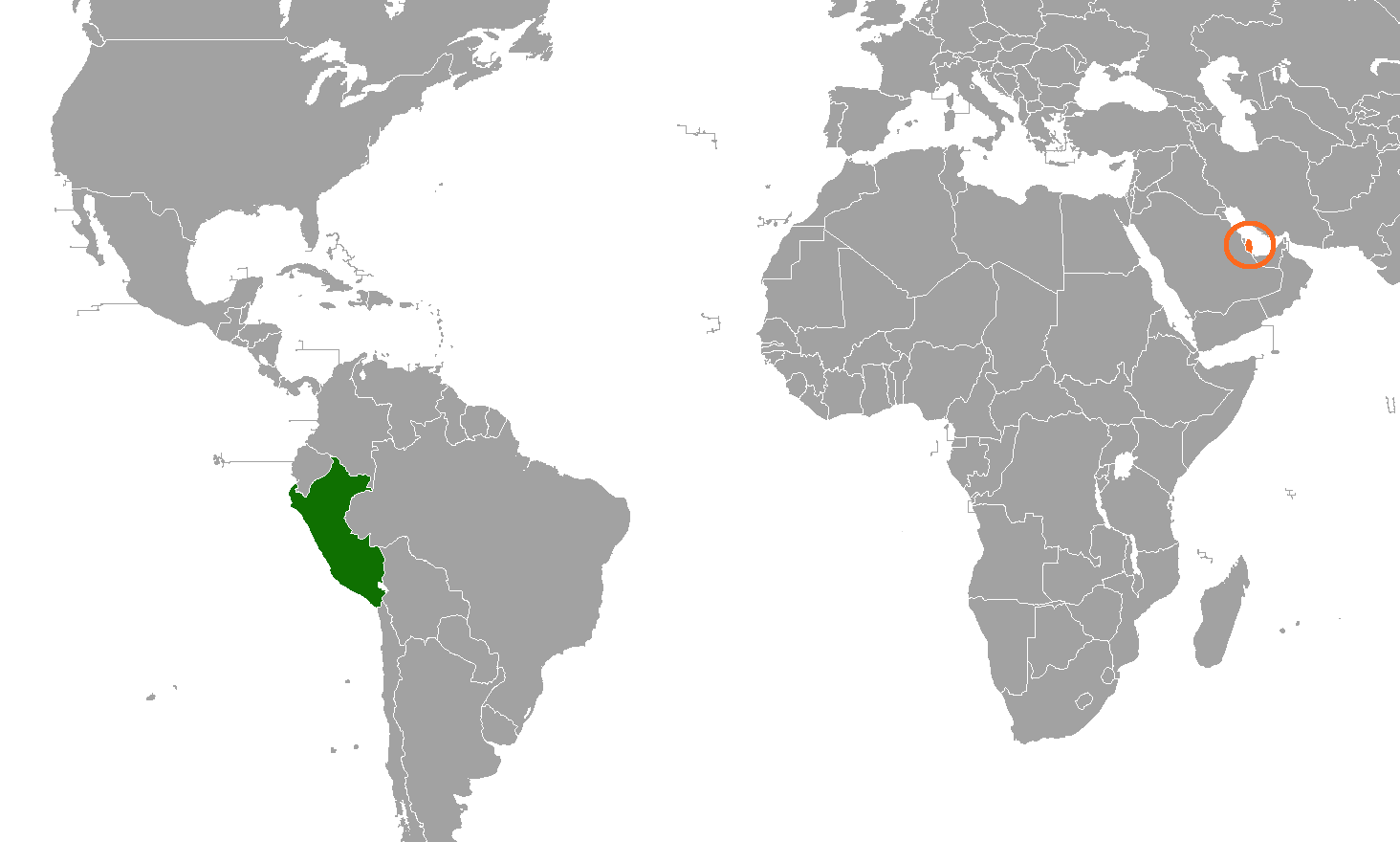

- Peru: Qatar

Diplomatic mission
- Embassy of Peru, Doha: Embassy of Qatar, Lima

Peru–Qatar relations are the bilateral relations between the Republic of Peru and the State of Qatar. Both nations are members of the World Trade Organization, the Non-Aligned Movement and the United Nations.

== History ==
Both countries established relations in 1989. In 2011, Peru opened an embassy in Doha, with Qatar opening an embassy in Lima in response the following year. Starting in 2013, a series of high-level visits took place, with two emirs of Qatar and one president of Peru visiting each other's countries. During these visits, seven bilateral treaties were signed by both countries' heads of state.

Commercial relations were negatively affected by the 2017 Qatar diplomatic crisis, as transport routes became limited due to the closure of the Gulf Cooperation Council's airspace to Qatari trade (with the exception of Kuwait and Oman).

In Peru, a parliamentary league of Peru–Qatari friendship operates under the Congress of Peru. As of 2023, the Peruvian community in Qatar consists of 157 people.

== High-level visits ==
High-level visits from Qatar to Peru

- Emir Hamad bin Khalifa Al Thani (2013)
- Emir Tamim bin Hamad Al Thani (2018)

High-level visits from Peru to Qatar

- Foreign Minister José Antonio García Belaúnde (2009)
- President Ollanta Humala (2014)

== Trade ==
As of 2020, Qatar is Peru's 4th trading partner in the Arab world, with trade valued in that year at US$ 17 million. Peruvian exports are mostly framed wood and pomegranates.

== Resident diplomatic missions ==
- Qatar has an embassy in Lima.
- Peru has an embassy in Doha.
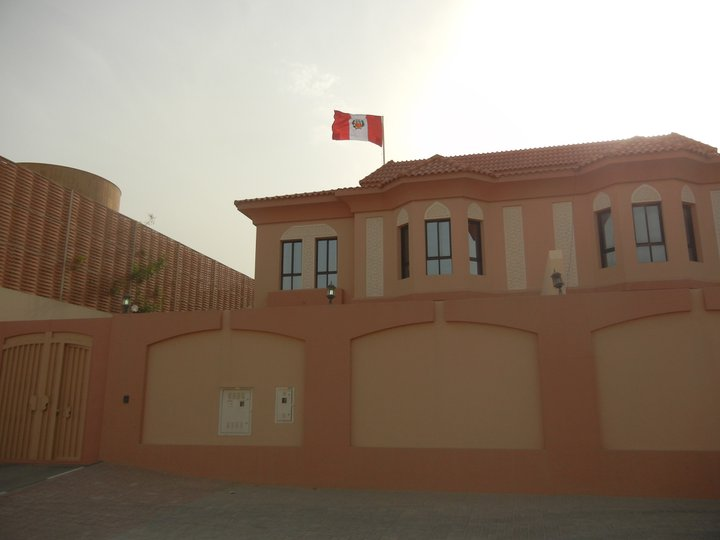
Embassy of Peru in Doha

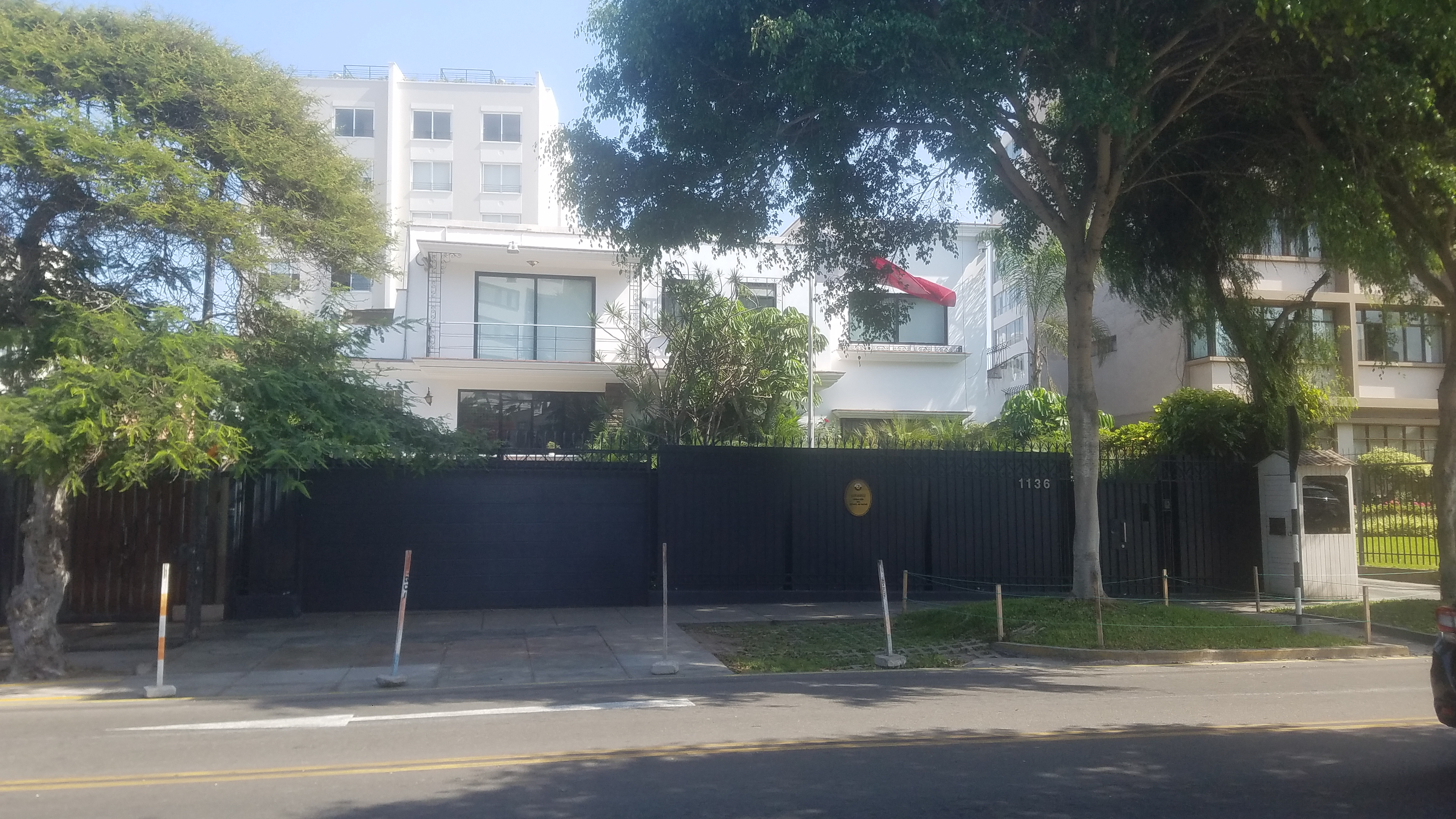
Embassy of Qatar in Lima

== See also ==
- Foreign relations of Peru
- Foreign relations of Qatar
- List of ambassadors of Peru to Qatar
- List of ambassadors of Qatar to Peru
