= Frederick Gordon-Lennox, 9th Duke of Richmond =

British peer, engineer, racing driver and motor racing promoter

His Grace The Duke of Richmond
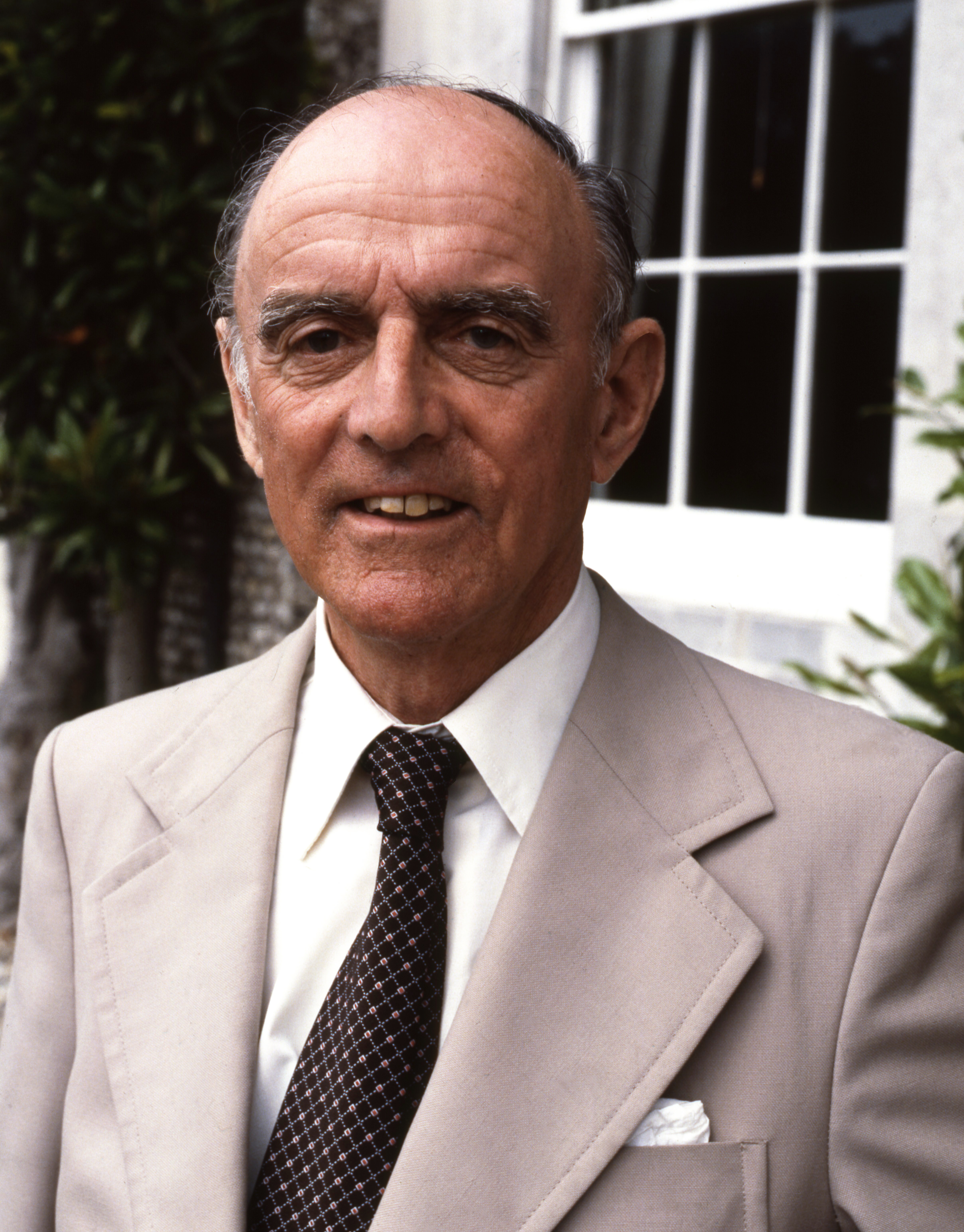
- Portrait by Allan Warren

Personal details
- Born: 5 February 1904 Marylebone, London
- Died: 2 November 1989 (aged 85) Chichester, West Sussex, England
- Spouse: Elizabeth Grace Hudson (m. 1927)
- Children: Charles Gordon Lennox, 10th Duke of Richmond; Lord Nicholas Gordon Lennox
- Parents: Charles Gordon Lennox, 8th Duke of Richmond; Hilda Madeline Brassey

Frederick Charles Gordon-Lennox, 9th Duke of Richmond, 9th Duke of Lennox, 9th Duke of Aubigny, 4th Duke of Gordon (5 February 1904 – 2 November 1989), also known as Freddie March and Freddie Richmond, was a British peer, engineer, racing driver, and motor racing promoter who founded the Goodwood Circuit at his Sussex estate.

== Early life ==
"Freddie" was born at 58, Great Cumberland Place, Marylebone, the second surviving son of Charles, Earl of March and Hilda Brassey. He was educated at Eton College and Christ Church, Oxford. His elder brother Charles Henry of the Royal Fusiliers was killed in action in 1919 during the Allied intervention in the Russian Civil War. In 1928, his father succeeded as the 8th Duke of Richmond, and Freddie was styled as Earl of March and Kinrara.

== Motor racing ==
His interest in engineering started while he was at university and afterwards, he was apprenticed to Bentley Motors in the 1920s. He began a motor racing career in 1929 when he took part in the JCC High-Speed Trial. In the next year, he became a member of the Austin team and won the Brooklands International 500 Miles Race. He created his own team of MG Midgets in 1931 and won the Brooklands Double Twelve race, but then became more involved in the organisational side of motorsport.

He inherited the Dukedoms in 1935, along with Goodwood House and its racecourse, near Chichester. Death duties meant he had to sell the family interests in Scotland, including Gordon Castle, and settle on Goodwood. He designed and flew his own aircraft and served with the Royal Air Force during World War II. For a time, he was based in Washington, working for the Ministry of Aircraft Production.

After the war, he faced the task of rehabilitating Goodwood, and saw the potential for creating a motor racing circuit from the air fighter station built at Goodwood during the Second World War. Horse racing was an important part of the Goodwood scene, but he did not share his ancestors' interest in the sport. Opened in 1948, the Goodwood Circuit became an important venue in motor racing. However, by 1966 the Duke was concerned at the increasing risks involved in motor racing and closed the circuit except for minor club activities and private testing.

The Duke was the longest-serving Vice President of the Royal Automobile Club, with which he was associated since 1948. As early as the thirties, he was the motoring correspondent of the Sunday Referee, and became the Founder President of the Guild of Motoring Writers.

The Duke appeared on the 14 December 1958 episode of the American version of What's My Line?.

A devout Anglican, the Duke represented the Church of England on the World Council of Churches' Central Committee from 1968.

== Marriage and children ==
He married Elizabeth Grace Hudson (1900–1992) on 15 December 1927. She was the daughter of Rev. Thomas William Hudson and his wife, Alethea Mary Matheson, and sister of Bishop Noel Hudson. They were married for sixty-one years and had two children:

- Charles Henry Gordon Lennox, 10th Duke of Richmond (19 September 1929 – 1 September 2017)
- Lord Nicholas Charles Gordon Lennox KCVO KCMG (31 January 1931 – 11 October 2004), married Mary Williamson and had issue. He was the British ambassador to Spain from 1984–9.

== Ancestry ==
Ancestors of Frederick Gordon-Lennox, 9th Duke of Richmond

16. Charles Lennox, 5th Duke of Richmond
8. Charles Gordon-Lennox, 6th Duke of Richmond
17. Lady Caroline Paget
4. Charles Gordon-Lennox, 7th Duke of Richmond
18. Algernon Greville
9. Frances Greville
19. Charlotte Cox
2. Charles Gordon-Lennox, 8th Duke of Richmond
20. Ralph Ricardo
10. Percy Ricardo
21. Charlotte Lobb
5. Amy Ricardo
22. John Hensley
11. Matilda Hensley
1. Frederick Gordon-Lennox, 9th Duke of Richmond
24. John Brassey
12. Thomas Brassey
25. Elizabeth Perceval
6. Henry Brassey
26. Thomas Harrison
13. Maria Harrison
3. Hilda Brassey
14. George Stevenson
7. Anna Stevenson

== Sources ==
- Times Obituary, November 1989

Peerage of England
Preceded by Charles Gordon-Lennox	Duke of Richmond; 3rd creation 1935–1989	Succeeded by Charles Gordon-Lennox
Peerage of Scotland
Preceded by Charles Gordon-Lennox	Duke of Lennox; 2nd creation 1935–1989	Succeeded by Charles Gordon-Lennox
Peerage of the United Kingdom
Preceded by Charles Gordon-Lennox	Duke of Gordon; 2nd creation 1935–1989	Succeeded by Charles Gordon-Lennox
French nobility
Preceded by Charles Gordon-Lennox	Duke of Aubigny; 1935–1989	Succeeded by Charles Gordon-Lennox
