= Peru–Saudi Arabia relations =

- Peru: Saudi Arabia

Diplomatic mission
- Embassy of Peru, Riyadh: Embassy of Saudi Arabia, Lima

Peru–Saudi Arabia relations are the bilateral relations between the Republic of Peru and the Kingdom of Saudi Arabia. Both countries are members of the World Trade Organization, the Non-Aligned Movement and the United Nations.

== History ==
Diplomatic relations between both countries were established on March 19, 1986. Relations between both countries began to develop starting in 2012. On the same year, a Saudi delegation visited the Summit of South American-Arab Countries held in Lima.

The Embassy of Peru in Saudi Arabia started operations on June 1, 2012, and the Saudi Embassy in Lima followed suit on June 27, 2013. Before the establishment of these embassies, contacts between both states was carried out through their embassies in the Egyptian capital, Cairo.

== High-level visits ==
High-level visits from Peru to Saudi Arabia

- Foreign Minister José Antonio García Belaúnde (2009)

High-level visits from Saudi Arabia to Peru

- Foreign Minister Adel al-Jubeir (2022)

== Trade ==
Saudi Arabia is Peru's second commercial partner in the Arab World. As of November 2021, bilateral trade amounted to US$164.78 million.

== Resident diplomatic missions ==
- Peru has an embassy in Riyadh.
- Saudi Arabia has an embassy in Lima.

== See also ==
- Foreign relations of Peru
- Foreign relations of Saudi Arabia
- List of ambassadors of Peru to Saudi Arabia
- List of ambassadors of Saudi Arabia to Peru
