= Peru–United Arab Emirates relations =

- Peru: United Arab Emirates

Diplomatic mission
- Consulate General of Peru, Dubai: Embassy of the United Arab Emirates, Lima

Peru–United Arab Emirates relations are diplomatic and bilateral relations between the Republic of Peru and the United Arab Emirates (UAE). Both countries are members of the Non-Aligned Movement, the World Trade Organization and the United Nations.

== History ==
Both countries established relations on June 17, 1986. In 2011, Peru opened a consulate general and a commercial office in Dubai. In March 2016, the UAE opened an embassy in Lima.

Bilateral engagement expanded significantly in the late 2000s alongside Peru's strategy to strengthen political and economic links with the Arab world and the Gulf Cooperation Council (GCC) countries. In late 2009, Peruvian Foreign Minister José Antonio García Belaúnde made an official visit to the UAE to enhance diplomatic cooperation and lay the groundwork for increased trade. That same year, Emirati Foreign Minister Sheikh Abdullah bin Zayed Al Nahyan made a reciprocal visit to Lima, signaling mutual interest in deepening economic and political partnerships.

To support growing commercial activities, Peru established a Consulate General and a trade office in Dubai in 2011. Political dialogue continued to build as Peruvian Economy Minister Luis Miguel Castilla visited the UAE in 2013 to attract Emirati investment, while Sheikh Abdullah bin Zayed returned to Lima for further high-level talks in 2014.

The partnership broadened to encompass trade agreements and formal bilateral frameworks. In February 2024, the two nations agreed to initiate negotiations toward a Comprehensive Economic Partnership Agreement (CEPA), launching the first round of official talks in November 2025 to boost trade flows in key sectors such as agriculture, minerals, and manufactured goods.

== Diaspora ==
The city is also home to a sizeable Peruvian community, the largest in an Arab country, and hosts the most Peruvian restaurants in the Middle East.

== High-level visits ==
High-level visits from Peru to the United Arab Emirates

- Foreign Minister José Antonio García Belaúnde (2009)
- Economic Minister Luis Miguel Castilla (2013)

High-level visits from the United Arab Emirates to Peru

- Foreign Minister Abdullah bin Zayed Al Nahyan (2009 & 2014)
- Minister of State for International Cooperation Reem Al Hashimy

== Trade ==
The UAE is Peru's first commercial partner in the Arab world. In 2020, trade between both countries was valued at US$ 530 million. Peru is the UAE's second destination in South America for investments. In 2024, bilateral trade between the two nations totaled approximately $1.98 billion, with Peruvian exports to the UAE reaching $1.94 billion driven primarily by gold ($1.9 billion) compared to $42.4 million in imports from the UAE, led by ethylene polymers ($10.1 million).

== Travel ==
In 2023, both countries signed a travel agreement so that Emirates starts operating direct flights to Lima. Following a 2023 agreement, updates to the bilateral air services framework between Italy and the United Arab Emirates positioned Emirates to receive fifth-freedom rights. This regime allows the carrier to operate direct passenger and belly cargo flights connecting Milan Malpensa to Jorge Chávez International Airport in Lima as part of a multi-leg route from Dubai.

== Resident diplomatic missions ==
- Peru has a consulate general in Dubai.
- The UAE has an embassy in Lima.

== See also ==
- Foreign relations of Peru
- Foreign relations of the United Arab Emirates
- List of consuls-general of Peru in Dubai
- List of ambassadors of the United Arab Emirates to Peru
