= Hilda Gordon-Lennox, Duchess of Richmond =

Her Grace The Duchess of Richmond, Lennox, and Gordon DBE FRHS JP

Personal details
- Born: 16 June 1872 Kensington, London, England
- Died: 29 December 1971 (aged 99) Westminster, London, England
- Spouse: Charles Henry Gordon-Lennox, 8th Duke of Richmond (m. 1893; died 1935)
- Children: Lady Amy Coats; Hon. Charles Gordon-Lennox; Lady Doris Vyner; Charles Gordon-Lennox, Lord Settrington; Frederick Gordon-Lennox, 9th Duke of Richmond
- Parents: Henry Brassey (father); Anna Harriet Stevenson (mother)
- Relatives: Thomas Brassey (paternal grandfather); Thomas Brassey, 1st Earl Brassey (paternal uncle); Albert Brassey (paternal uncle)

Hilda Madeline Gordon-Lennox, Duchess of Richmond, Lennox, and Gordon DBE FRHS JP (née Brassey; 16 June 1872 – 29 December 1971) was a British aristocrat, horticulturist, and philanthropist. She was known as Lady Settrington from 1893 to 1903, and as Countess of March from 1903–28.

She was born at 51 Queen's Gate, Kensington, the daughter of Henry Brassey, M.P. and Anna Harriet Stevenson (died 15 July 1898), and granddaughter of the railway pioneer Thomas Brassey. She married Charles Gordon-Lennox, Lord Settrington in 1893. Her husband succeeded as 8th Duke of Richmond and 3rd Duke of Gordon in 1928.

Lady Settrington joined her husband in South Africa in early 1900, when he served there during the Second Boer War.

She was elected a Fellow of the Royal Horticultural Society in 1902, and in 1927 she became the first chairman of the National Gardens Scheme.

The Duchess was closely involved with the Soldiers', Sailors', and Airmen's Families Association (SSAFA). She was national vice-chairman of the charity from 1925–45 and acting national chairman from 1939–41. She also held the office of Justice of the Peace (JP) for Sussex and, later, Morayshire.

She was invested as a CBE in the 1919 New Year Honours and as DBE in the 1946 New Year Honours in recognition of her work with the SSAFA.

Her husband died in 1935. She died in 1971, aged 99.

== Family ==
On 8 June 1893, Hilda Madeline Brassey married Charles Henry Gordon-Lennox, the 8th Duke of Richmond (born 30 December 1870 – died 7 May 1935); they had the following children:

- Lady Amy Gwendoline Gordon-Lennox (5 May 1894 – 1975); married, in 1917, Sir James Stuart Coats.
- Hon. Charles Henry Gordon-Lennox (15 August 1895 – 5 September 1895)
- Lady Doris Hilda Gordon-Lennox (6 September 1896 – c. 8 February 1980); married Commander Clare George Vyner. She was a bridesmaid to Princess Mary and a close friend of Queen Elizabeth The Queen Mother.
- Charles Henry Gordon-Lennox, Lord Settrington (26 January 1899 – 24 August 1919)
- Frederick Charles Gordon-Lennox, 9th Duke of Richmond, 9th Duke of Lennox, 4th Duke of Gordon (5 February 1904 – 2 November 1989)
