= Robin Fearn =

British diplomat

Sir Patrick Robin Fearn KCMG (5 September 1934 – 26 August 2006) was a British diplomat who was ambassador to Cuba and Spain.

== Career ==
Patrick Robin Fearn was educated at Ratcliffe College and University College, Oxford. After national service 1952–54 he worked for Dunlop Rubber in Venezuela and the Caribbean 1957–61, then joined the Diplomatic Service. Between posts at the Foreign Office (later the Foreign and Commonwealth Office, FCO) he served at the embassies in Caracas, Havana, Budapest, as Head of Chancery and Consul at Vientiane 1972–75 and as Head of Chancery and Consul General at Islamabad 1977–79. He was head of the South America department at the FCO 1979–82, culminating in the invasion of the Falkland Islands by Argentina on 2 April 1982.

From the moment of the invasion, it fell to Fearn to organise and animate – indeed, almost to invent – the emergency unit which had to manage intra-Whitehall coordination as well as to seek international support for the UK's response. He worked almost without pause for weeks on end, but remained calm, reassuring and approachable, encouraging his team by his own example as they shouldered a huge burden of work. – Obituary, The Guardian

After the war Fearn spent 1983 at the Royal College of Defence Studies, writing a thesis on the Antarctic Treaty. He was ambassador to Cuba 1984–86, assistant Under-Secretary of State (Americas) at the FCO 1986–89, and ambassador to Spain 1989–94. He was appointed CMG after the Falklands war and knighted KCMG during his posting to Spain.

After retiring from the Diplomatic Service, Fearn was director of the Oxford University Diplomatic Studies Programme and visiting Fellow of University College 1995–99.

Diplomatic posts
Preceded by David Thomas	Ambassador to Cuba; 1984–1986	Succeeded by Andrew Palmer
Preceded by Lord Nicholas Gordon-Lennox	Ambassador Extraordinary and Plenipotentiary at Madrid; 1989–1994	Succeeded by David Brighty
