= Lord Nicholas Gordon-Lennox =

British diplomat

Lord Nicholas Gordon-Lennox KCMG KCVO

Her Majesty's Ambassador to Spain
- In office 1984–1989
- Monarch: Elizabeth II
- Prime Minister: Margaret Thatcher
- Preceded by: Sir Richard Parsons
- Succeeded by: Sir Robin Fearn

Governor of the BBC
- In office 1990–1998
- Monarch: Elizabeth II

Personal details
- Born: Nicholas Charles Gordon-Lennox; 31 January 1931
- Died: 11 October 2004 (aged 73)
- Children: 4
- Parent: Frederick, 9th Duke of Richmond
- Education: Worcester College, Oxford
- Occupation: Diplomat

Lord Nicholas Charles Gordon-Lennox KCMG KCVO (31 January 1931 – 11 October 2004), the younger son of the 9th Duke of Richmond and his wife, Elizabeth, was a British diplomat, serving as Her Majesty's Ambassador to Spain from 1984 to 1989.

== Background and early life ==
Gordon-Lennox was born the younger son of Frederick Gordon-Lennox, the Earl of March and Kinrara. On his grandfather's death in 1935, his father succeeded as the 9th Duke of Richmond, with Gordon-Lennox becoming 'Lord Nicholas'. He was raised at the family home of Goodwood House before being sent with his elder brother, Charles, to the United States at the outbreak of World War II. He returned to Britain in 1944 to join Eton and later won a scholarship to read history at Worcester College, Oxford.

== Career ==
After graduation and National Service with the King's Royal Rifle Corps, he joined HM Foreign Service in 1954 and became Private Secretary to the British Ambassador to the United States, Sir Harold Caccia, in 1957, for which he was awarded the LVO. He transferred to Chile in 1961 as Second Secretary, and then First Secretary, at Santiago.

In 1963, he returned to England again to become Private Secretary to Caccia again, in the latter's post as Permanent Under-Secretary at the Foreign Office, before moving to Madrid as Head of the Chancery in 1966.

After a brief secondment at the Cabinet Office from 1971 to 1973, he became Head of the News Department at the Foreign and Commonwealth Office and then Head of the North American Department in 1974, before becoming a Counsellor at Paris in 1975 and was awarded the CMG in 1978.

In 1979 he became Assistant Under-Secretary at the Foreign Commonwealth Office and his final diplomatic post was as British Ambassador to Spain from 1984 to 1989. Gordon-Lennox was then a Governor of the BBC from 1990 and retired in 1998.

== Personal life ==
He married Mary Williamson, daughter of Brigadier Hudleston Noel Hedworth Williamson, on 14 January 1958. They had four children and eleven grandchildren:

- Sarah Caroline Gordon-Lennox (20 January 1960); married Dominic Caldecott in 1988. They have three sons and one daughter.
- Henrietta Mary Gordon-Lennox (8 January 1962); married Michael Lindsell in 1992. They have three children, two sons and a daughter.
- Lucy Elizabeth Gordon-Lennox (28 December 1965); married Mark Cornell on 7 December 1996. They have four children, two sons and two daughters.
- Anthony Charles Gordon-Lennox (26 April 1969 – 7 October 2017).

He died on 11 October 2004, aged 73.

== Honours ==
Gordon-Lennox was awarded the Grand Cross of the Order of Isabella the Catholic in 1986, for his role as Ambassador from the United Kingdom to Spain. He was promoted to KCMG in 1986 and then KCVO in 1988.

Knight Commander of the Order of St Michael and St George (KCMG)	1986
Companion of the Order of St Michael and St George (CMG)	1978
Knight Commander of the Royal Victorian Order (KCVO)	1988
Lieutenant of the Royal Victorian Order (LVO)	1957
Knight Grand Cross of the Order of Isabella the Catholic (Spain)	1986

== Posts and offices ==
Diplomatic posts
Preceded by Richard Parsons	British Ambassador to Spain; 1984–1989	Succeeded by Sir Robin Fearn
Military offices
Preceded by The Lord Holderness	Honorary Colonel of the 4th Battalion of The Royal Green Jackets; 1990–1996	Succeeded by Sir Geoffrey Pattie

== Sources ==
- Profile, burkes-peerage.net
- Obituary, telegraph.co.uk
