= Oxford University Diplomatic Studies Programme =

Programme of courses offered by the University of Oxford

The Oxford University Diplomatic Studies Programme (formerly known as the Foreign Service Programme) is a long-running programme of courses offered by the University of Oxford in the field of diplomacy. The programme was originally established in 1969 in partnership with the Foreign and Commonwealth Office, with the intention of educating diplomats of newly independent Commonwealth countries. The programme has since run continuously, celebrating its fiftieth anniversary in 2019, and now consists of a Master of Studies (MSt) in Diplomatic Studies. It is customised for professionals, typically early to mid-career diplomats and other international relations practitioners who seek the combination of academic and vocational study. The annual intake has a global reach, and participants come from a wide range of countries. Over its many years within the university, alumni of the programme have included royalty and heads of state, as well as senior government figures from all over the world.

== History ==
Building on a long history of the universities of Oxford and Cambridge being linked to the British civil service, in 1926 they jointly created a Tropical African Services Course on behalf of the British Colonial Office. This programme continued in varying forms and under different names for another forty-three years, as the Colonial Administrative Service Course (1934), the Devonshire Course (1945), Course 'A' and 'B' (1953), the Overseas Service Course (1962) and, finally, the Overseas Course in Government and Development (1964).

As many Commonwealth states gained independence, their governments sought trained diplomats to staff their Foreign Services. In response to this need, in the 1960s, the Overseas Course was adapted to allow for a small Foreign Service component, morphing, in 1964, into a coherent and more integrated Foreign Service Training Course under the auspices of the Overseas Service Course. Examinations were instituted in 1966.

When the Overseas Service Course was discontinued in 1969, the Foreign Service element of that course was transformed into the Foreign Service Programme, based out of Queen Elizabeth House, Oxford. In the decades that followed, the programme expanded its audience to governments in the Middle East, Latin America, and Asia. After the Fall of the Berlin Wall in November 1989, the Foreign and Commonwealth and Office requested places be made available to newly independent former Soviet countries, to help to build their diplomatic capacity. In 2010, the programme moved to the Department for Continuing Education at Oxford, and in 2017 it changed its name to the Diplomatic Studies Programme, reflecting the more common terminology in the modern academic field.

== Notable alumni ==
- Jigme Khesar Namgyel Wangchuck, King of Bhutan
- Haitham bin Tariq, Sultan and Prime Minister of Oman
- Ratu Epeli Nailatikau, former President of Fiji
- Sultan Muhammad V, former Yang di-Pertuan Agong (head of state of Malaysia)
- Benazir Bhutto, former Prime Minister of Pakistan
- Enele Sopoaga, Prime Minister of Tuvalu
- Tupoutoʻa ʻUlukalala, Crown Prince of Tonga
- Haji Al-Muhtadee Billah, Crown Prince of Brunei
- Grigol Mgaloblishvili, former Prime Minister of Georgia
- Koila Nailatikau, Minister of Tourism, then First Lady of Fiji.
- José Antonio García Belaúnde, FM of Peru & Professor of the Javier Perez de Cuellar Diplo. Academy
- Amina Mohamed, former Cabinet Secretary for Foreign Affairs of Kenya

== Directors ==
- 1969–1986: Ralph Feltham
- 1986–1987: Anthony Kirk-Greene
- 1987–1988: Philip McKearney
- 1988–1990: Anthony Kirk-Greene
- 1990–1995: Sir John Johnson
- 1995–1999: Sir Robin Fearn
- 1999–2003: Christopher Long
- 2003–2010: Alan Hunt
- 2003–2006: Rodney Hall (Academic Director)
- 2010–2015: Jeremy Cresswell
- 2015–2019: Kate Jones
- 2020: Dr Vahid Nick Pay and Dr Charles Boyle (interim directors)
- 2021–present: Dr Yolanda Kemp Spies
