= List of ambassadors of Qatar to Peru =

Ambassador of Qatar to Peru
- Incumbent; Jabr bin Abdullah Khalfan Al-Suwaidi since 2021
- Inaugural holder: Jamal Nasser Sultan al-Bader
- Formation: 2012

The Qatari ambassador in Lima is the official representative of the Government of Qatar to the Government of Peru.

Both countries established relations in 1989. The Peruvian embassy in Doha opened in 2011, and the Qatari embassy in Lima opened next year.

== List of representatives ==
Term start	Ambassador	Observations	Prime minister of Qatar	President of Peru	Term end
2012	Jamal Nasser Sultan al-Bader (جمال ناصر سلطان البدر)	First ambassador to Peru.	Hamad bin Jassim bin Jaber Al Thani	Ollanta Humala	2015
2017	Khalifa Al Zarraa	As Chief of Mission.	Abdullah bin Nasser bin Khalifa Al Thani	Pedro Pablo Kuczynski	2018
2018	Ali Hamad Ali Mohamed Al Sulaiti (علي حمد علي محمد السليطي)	As ambassador.	Abdullah bin Nasser bin Khalifa Al Thani	Martín Vizcarra	2021
2021	Jabr bin Abdullah Khalfan Al-Suwaidi (جبر بن عبدالله السويدي)	As ambassador.	Khalid bin Khalifa bin Abdul Aziz Al Thani	Pedro Castillo	Incumbent

== See also ==
- List of ambassadors of Peru to Qatar
