= Charles Gordon-Lennox, 8th Duke of Richmond =

British peer and politician

His Grace The Duke of Richmond DSO MVO
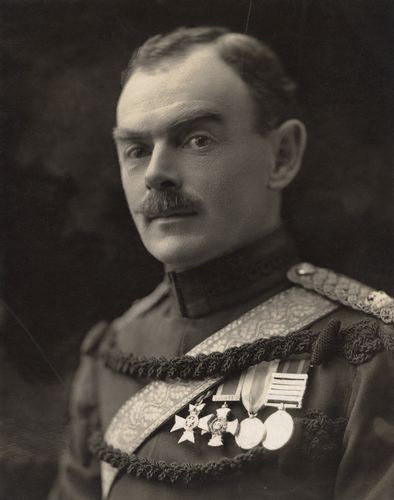
- In office 18 January 1928 – 7 May 1935

Personal details
- Born: 30 December 1870
- Died: 7 May 1935 (aged 64)
- Spouse: Hilda Madeline Brassey (m. 1893)
- Children: Lady Amy Coats; Hon. Charles Gordon-Lennox; Lady Doris Vyner; Charles Gordon-Lennox, Lord Settrington; Frederick Gordon-Lennox, 9th Duke of Richmond
- Parent(s): Charles Gordon-Lennox, 7th Duke of Richmond; Amy Mary Ricardo

Charles Henry Gordon-Lennox, 8th Duke of Richmond, 8th Duke of Lennox, 3rd Duke of Gordon DSO MVO (30 December 1870 – 7 May 1935), known as Lord Settrington 1870–1903, and as Earl of March 1903–1928, was a British peer and politician.

== Biography ==
Lord Settrington was the son of Charles Gordon-Lennox, 7th Duke of Richmond (at the time known as Earl of March, as his father, the 6th Duke was still alive) by his first wife, Amy Mary Ricardo (1849–1879), daughter of Percy Ricardo, of Bramley Park and Mathilde Hensley. He was styled as Earl of March when his father held the dukedom, and inherited the dukedom upon his father's death in 1928, holding the title for only seven years.

He was promoted to captain while in the service of the 3rd (Militia) Battalion, Royal Sussex Regiment. In December 1899 he was seconded as a staff officer, and appointed an Aide-de-camp to Lord Roberts, Commander-in-Chief of the forces in South Africa during the early part of the Second Boer War. He was appointed Lieutenant-Colonel in command of the Sussex Yeomanry on 8 July 1914, just before the outbreak of World War I.

== Family ==
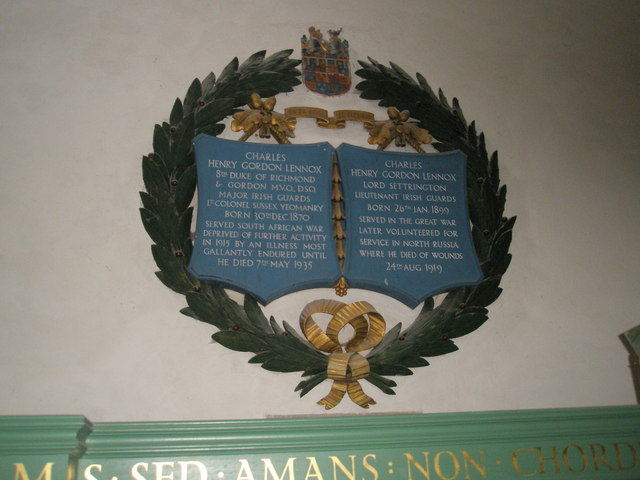
Memorial to the Duke and his second son in Boxgrove Priory church

Lord Settrington married Hilda Madeline Brassey (1872 – 29 December 1971) on 8 June 1893; they had five children:

- Lady Amy Gwendolin Gordon-Lennox (5 May 1894 – 27 April 1975); married Sir James Stuart Coats, 3rd Bt.
- The Hon. Charles Henry Gordon-Lennox (15 August 1895 – 5 September 1895)
- Lady Doris Hilda Gordon-Lennox (6 September 1896 – 5 February 1980); married Commander Clare George Vyner. She was a close friend of Queen Elizabeth The Queen Mother.
- Charles Henry Gordon-Lennox, Lord Settrington (26 January 1899 – 24 August 1919)
- Frederick Charles Gordon-Lennox, 9th Duke of Richmond, 9th Duke of Lennox, 4th Duke of Gordon (5 February 1904 – 2 November 1989)

== Ancestry ==
Ancestors of Charles Gordon-Lennox, 8th Duke of Richmond

8. Charles Gordon-Lennox, 5th Duke of Richmond
4. Charles Gordon-Lennox, 6th Duke of Richmond
9. Lady Caroline Paget
2. Charles Gordon-Lennox, 7th Duke of Richmond
10. Algernon Frederick Greville
5. Frances Harriett Greville
11. Charlotte Maria Cox
1. Charles Gordon-Lennox, 8th Duke of Richmond
12. Ralph Ricardo
6. Percy Ricardo
13. Charlotte Lobb
3. Amy Mary Ricardo
14. John Isaac Hensley
7. Matilda Mawdesley Hensley
15. Mary Ann Wilson

Honorary titles
Preceded by The Duke of Richmond	Lord Lieutenant of Moray; 1928–1935	Succeeded by The Earl of Moray
Peerage of England
Preceded by Charles Gordon-Lennox	Duke of Richmond; 3rd creation 1928–1935	Succeeded by Frederick Gordon-Lennox
Peerage of Scotland
Preceded by Charles Gordon-Lennox	Duke of Lennox; 2nd creation 1928–1935	Succeeded by Frederick Gordon-Lennox
Peerage of the United Kingdom
Preceded by Charles Gordon-Lennox	Duke of Gordon; 2nd creation 1928–1935	Succeeded by Frederick Gordon-Lennox
French nobility
Preceded by Charles Gordon-Lennox	Duke of Aubigny; 1928–1935	Succeeded by Frederick Gordon-Lennox
