= Archangel Allied Cemetery =

CWGC cemetery in Russia

Coordinates: 64.5530°N 40.5429°E

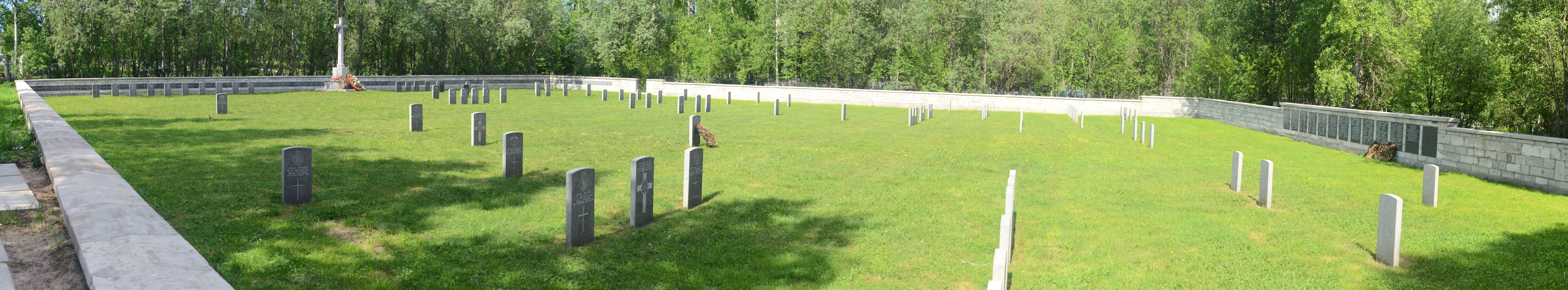
Archangel Allied Cemetery

The Archangel Allied Cemetery is a military cemetery in Arkhangelsk, Russia, that is under the management of the Commonwealth War Graves Commission. Amongst the buried or commemorated are Charles Gordon-Lennox, Lord Settrington and Canadian Royce Coleman Dyer.
