= List of ambassadors of Peru to Kuwait =

Ambassador of Peru to the State of Kuwait
- Great Seal of Peru
- Ministry of Foreign Affairs
- Appointer: The president of Peru
- Website: Embassy of Peru in Kuwait

The extraordinary and plenipotentiary ambassador of Peru to the State of Kuwait is the official representative of the Republic of Peru to the State of Kuwait.

Both countries established relations on December 1, 1975, and have maintained them since. After the Iraqi invasion of Kuwait, Peru condemned the invasion and supported Kuwait. Peru maintains an embassy in Kuwait City, which closed at one point but reopened in 2010.

== List of representatives ==
Name	Portrait	Term begin	Term end	President	Notes
Amador Velásquez García Monterroso		2010	2012	Alan García	As ambassador.
Heli Peláez Castro		April 20, 2013	2016	Ollanta Humala	As ambassador.
Rolando Domingo Lozada Valderrama		2015	Incumbent	Ollanta Humala	As chargé d'affaires (a. i.)
Francisco Javier Rivarola Rubio		2017	July 20, 2020	Pedro Pablo Kuczynski	As ambassador.
Carlos Manuel Alfredo Velasco Mendiola		December 25, 2022	2026	Dina Boluarte	As ambassador.

== See also ==
- List of ambassadors of Peru to Qatar
- List of ambassadors of Peru to Saudi Arabia
- List of consuls-general of Peru in Dubai
