= List of ambassadors of Saudi Arabia to Peru =

Ambassador of Saudi Arabia to Peru
- Emblem of Saudi Arabia
- Incumbent; Hassan Mohammed Alansari since 2022
- Ministry of Foreign Affairs of Saudi Arabia
- Appointer: The King
- Inaugural holder: Sahal Mustafa Ergesous (as chargé d'affaires)
- Formation: 2013

The Ambassador of Saudi Arabia to Peru is the official representative of the Kingdom of Saudi Arabia to the President and Government of Peru. The ambassador and the embassy staff work at the Saudi Embassy in Miraflores, Lima.

== List of ambassadors ==
No.	Name	Observations	Start of term	End of term	Appointer
-	Ahmad Hamad Al-Hamoud	Ambassador on special mission.	2013	2013	Abdullah
1	Sahal Mustafa Ergesous (سهل بن مصطفى عرقسوس)	First ambassador to Peru, started as a chargé d'affaires.	2013	2016	Abdullah
2	Munir bin Ibrahim al-Punjabi (منير بن إبراهيم البنجابي)		2016	2018	Salman
3	Waleed Bin Abdullah Y. Mokeem	Presented his credentials on December 28, 2018.	2018	2022	Salman
4	Hassan Mohammed Alansari	Presented his credentials on September 29, 2022.	2022	Incumbent	Salman

== See also ==
- Peru–Saudi Arabia relations
- List of ambassadors of Peru to Saudi Arabia
