= Royce Coleman Dyer =

Canadian soldier

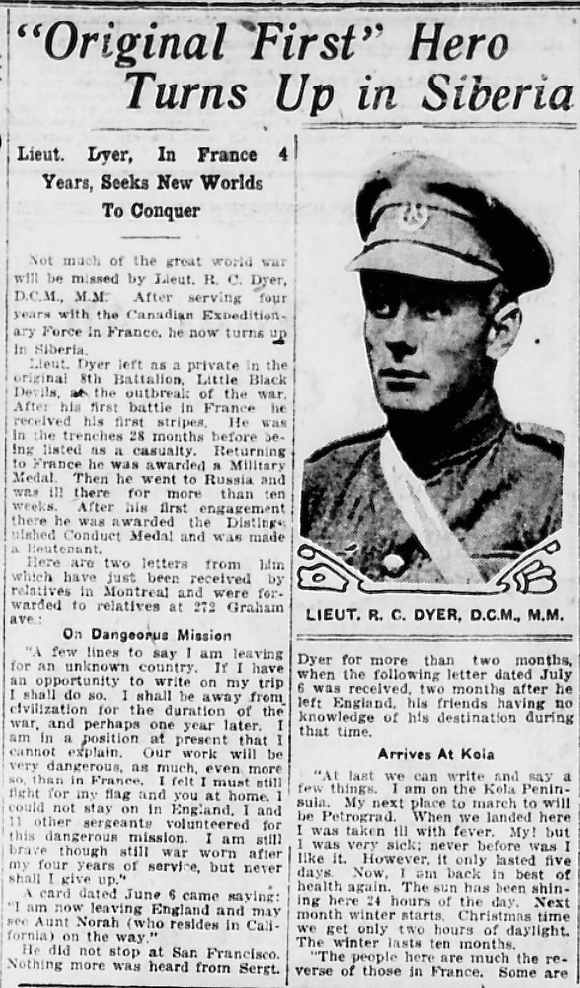
- Newspaper clipping from the Winnipeg Evening Tribune
- Born: February 1, 1889; Sutton, Quebec, Canada
- Died: December 30, 1918 (aged 29); Arkhangelsk, Russia
- Burial place: Archangel Allied Cemetery, Russia
- Military career
- Allegiance: Canada
- Branch: Canadian Expeditionary Force; Special Service Force
- Service years: 1914–1918
- Rank: Captain
- Commands: Slavo-British Allied Legion "SBAL" aka Dyer's Battalion
- Conflicts: First World War; Second Battle of Ypres; Battle of Mont Sorrel; Battle of the Somme; North Russia Intervention †
- Awards: Military Medal Distinguished Conduct Medal Russian Order of St. George 4th Class

Captain Royce Coleman Dyer, DCM, MM (February 1, 1889 – December 30, 1918) was a Canadian soldier who fought during the First World War and led a Russian unit during the North Russia intervention, which was part of the Allied intervention in the Russian Civil War after the October Revolution. He died of broncho-pneumonia on December 30, 1918, while serving in Russia.

== Early life and First World War ==
The son of the five-term mayor of Sutton, Quebec, Leon C. Dyer, Royce Coleman Dyer was born in Sutton on February 1, 1889. Before the war he worked as a butcher.

Dyer enlisted on September 23, 1914, in Valcartier, Quebec, and was assigned to the 8th Battalion (90th Winnipeg Rifles), CEF, the 'Black Devils'. He participated in a number of battles during his service, including the Second Battle of Ypres. During the Battle of Mont Sorrel his actions earned him the Military Medal. During this action he was gassed. After losing consciousness he was found in a ditch two days later, then spent the next month in hospital. After being promoted to sergeant, he was hospitalized after breaking a rib during the Battle of the Somme, and again knocked out of action after suffering a gunshot wound to the torso.

== North Russia intervention ==
While recovering in England from his bullet wound, he was approached about joining the Special Service Force that was being sent to assist anti-Bolshevik forces near Arkhangelsk, Russia, as part of the Allied North Russia intervention. He attracted the attention of the unit's commander General Edmund Ironside after his actions while taking the village of Onega, for which he received the Distinguished Conduct Medal.

445 A./Sjt. R. C. Dyer, M.M., 8th Bn., Can. Infy. (N. RUSSIA).
For conspicuous gallantry and resource during the landing at Onega and clearing of the town. He set a very fine example to his men throughout the action, and, from a very exposed position, successfully engaged an enemy machine-gun at close range with his Lewis gun. He showed marked courage in taking up new positions with his gun under heavy machine-gun and cross rifle fire, and by his skilful use of it rendered very valuable service.

— The London Gazette 14 January 1919

=== Dyer's Battalion ===
General Ironside needed more men for his Russian occupation force and so looked to recruit local Russians. When enrollment figures came up short he took the suggestion of one of his staff and looked to recruit criminals from the local prisons. Called the Slavo-British Allied Legion (SBAL) he assigned their training to Dyer, who was promoted to lieutenant. With British, Australian and Canadian officers Dyer created a unit of just under three hundred ex-prisoners. The men viewed their lieutenant with much respect and took to calling themselves “Dyer’s Battalion.” Encouraged by the progress of the unit Allied Russian command promoted Dyer to captain. During training, disaster struck when he died from broncho-pneumonia. The unit never recovered but to show their respect the men carried around a huge portrait of Dyer when marching, as is the Eastern Orthodox tradition of an icon. With their namesake dead, morale in the battalion plummeted. Dyer had resisted enlisting suspected Bolsheviks, but after his death, high command ignored this and many imprisoned Russian Bolsheviks were added to the unit. When the unit was moved to the front lines tensions grew, and on July 7, 1919, the men murdered their officers. The mutineers then ordered the soldiers to cross enemy lines and join the Bolsheviks.

== Death ==
Dyer became ill while serving in Russia, and on December 27, 1918, he was admitted to the 82nd Casualty Clearing Station in Bakharitza suffering from fever. The medics there diagnosed his ailment as broncho-pneumonia, then a deadly disease, which he died from three days later, on December 30. Enlisting in 1914 and dying long after the First World War had ended, he was one of the first Canadians to volunteer and the last to die. He is buried at Archangel Allied Cemetery.

== Bibliography ==
Notes

References

- Ford, Trevor (June 30, 2017). "Dyer's Battalion: the Untold Story of the Russian Revolution (Part I)". canadianmilitaryhistory.ca.
- Ford, Trevor (July 3, 2018). "Dyer's Battalion: the Untold Story of the Russian Revolution (Part II)". canadianmilitaryhistory.ca.
- Kinvig, Clifford (2007). Churchill's Crusade: The British Invasion of Russia, 1918–1920. A & C Black. ISBN 9781847250216. – Total pages: 400
- Library and Archives Canada (2019). "Personnel Records of the First World War: Dyer". Government of Canada.
- The London Gazette (January 14, 1919). "Distinguished Conduct Medal announcements in the Fifth Supplement to the London Gazette 31128". The London Gazette. No. 31128. London, UK: Government of the United Kingdom. ISSN 0374-3721. OCLC 6672113.
- MacLaren, Roy (1976). Canadians in Russia, 1918–1919. Macmillan of Canada. ISBN 9780770513399. – Total pages: 301
- Swettenham, John (2017). Allied Intervention in Russia 1918–1919: And the Part Played by Canada. Routledge. ISBN 9781351798761. – Total pages: 322
- Vachon, Jocelyn (2019). "A Hundred Years Ago, The Great War Began" (PDF). Héritage Sutton.
- The Vancouver Daily World (November 23, 1918). "Original First Hero Turns Up in Siberia". The Vancouver Daily World. Vancouver, British Columbia.
- Veterans Affairs Canada (2019). "Captain Royce Coleman Dyer". Government of Canada.
