= List of ambassadors of Peru to Saudi Arabia =

Ambassador of Peru to the Kingdom of Saudi Arabia
- Great Seal of Peru
- Ministry of Foreign Affairs
- Appointer: The president of Peru
- Inaugural holder: Eduardo Martinetti
- Formation: 2012
- Website: Embassy of Peru in Saudi Arabia

The extraordinary and plenipotentiary ambassador of Peru to the Kingdom of Saudi Arabia is the official representative of the Republic of Peru to the Kingdom of Saudi Arabia.

Since the post's creation, the ambassador in Riyadh is also accredited to Bahrain and Oman.

Both countries established relations in April 1986, but diplomatic representation to the Arabian Peninsula had existed since their accreditation from the Embassy in Lebanon at least 20 years prior. Peru opened its embassy in Riyadh in 2012.

== List of representatives ==
| Name | Portrait | Term begin | Term end | President | Notes |
|---|---|---|---|---|---|
| Julio Eduardo Martinetti Macedo | | 2012 | 2015 | Ollanta Humala | First ambassador to Saudi Arabia; accredited to Bahrain and Oman. |
| Carlos Rodolfo Zapata López | | 2015 | 2020 | Ollanta Humala | As ambassador. |
| José Luis Salinas Montes | | June 7, 2020 | 2021 | Martín Vizcarra | As ambassador. |
| Carlos Rodolfo Zapata López | | February 1, 2022 | 2026 | Pedro Castillo | As ambassador. |

== See also ==
- List of ambassadors of Saudi Arabia to Peru
- List of ambassadors of Peru to Kuwait
- List of ambassadors of Peru to Qatar
- List of consuls-general of Peru in Dubai
