= List of ambassadors of Peru to Qatar =

Ambassador of Peru to the State of Qatar
- Great Seal of Peru
- Ministry of Foreign Affairs
- Appointer: The president of Peru
- Inaugural holder: Julio Florián Alegre
- Formation: 2011
- Website: Embassy of Peru in Qatar

The extraordinary and plenipotentiary ambassador of Peru to the State of Qatar is the official representative of the Republic of Peru to the State of Qatar.

Both countries established relations in 1989. The Peruvian embassy in Doha opened in 2011, and the Qatari embassy in Lima opened next year.

== List of representatives ==
Name	Portrait	Term begin	Term end	President	Notes
Julio Jorge Guillermo Florián Alegre		March 1, 2011	2016	Alan García	First ambassador in Qatar.
Carlos Manuel Alfredo Velasco Mendiola		November 1, 2016	2018	Pedro Pablo Kuczynski	As ambassador.
José Benzaquén Perea		2019	2024	Martín Vizcarra	As ambassador.

== See also ==
- List of ambassadors of Qatar to Peru
- List of ambassadors of Peru to Kuwait
- List of ambassadors of Peru to Saudi Arabia
- List of consuls-general of Peru in Dubai
