= Charles Gordon-Lennox, Lord Settrington =

British aristocrat

Lieutenant Lord Settrington
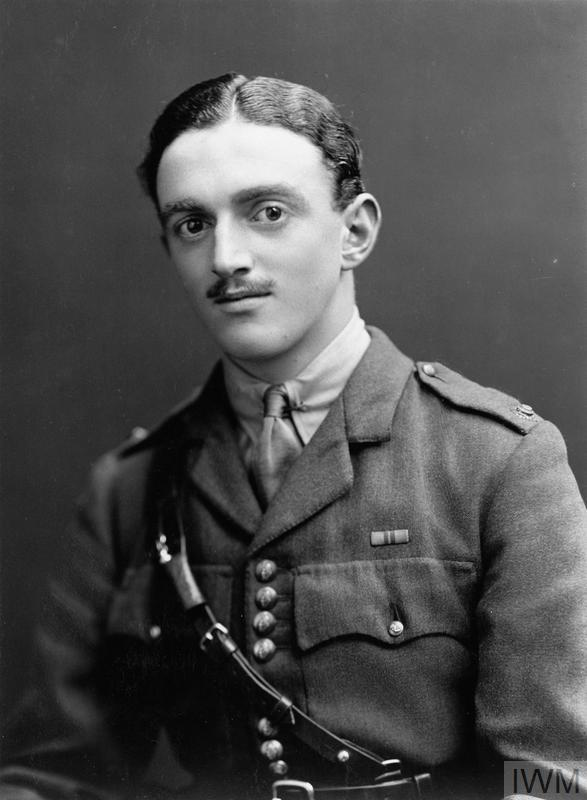
- Born: 26 January 1899; 67 Cadogan Square, London, United Kingdom
- Died: 24 August 1919 (aged 20); Bereznik, Severnaya Oblast, Russian State
- Burial place: Archangel Allied Cemetery, Arkhangelsk, Arkhangelsk Oblast, Russia
- Relatives: Charles Gordon-Lennox, 8th Duke of Richmond (father); Hilda Brassey (mother)
- Military career
- Branch: British Army
- Service years: 1916–1919
- Rank: Lieutenant
- Units: Irish Guards; Royal Fusiliers
- Conflicts: World War I; Russian Civil War †

Charles Henry Gordon-Lennox, Lord Settrington (26 January 1899 – 24 August 1919) was a British aristocrat and heir to the dukedoms of Richmond, Lennox and Gordon. A lieutenant in the British Army during World War I and the Russian Civil War, he was killed during the North Russia intervention.

== Early life ==
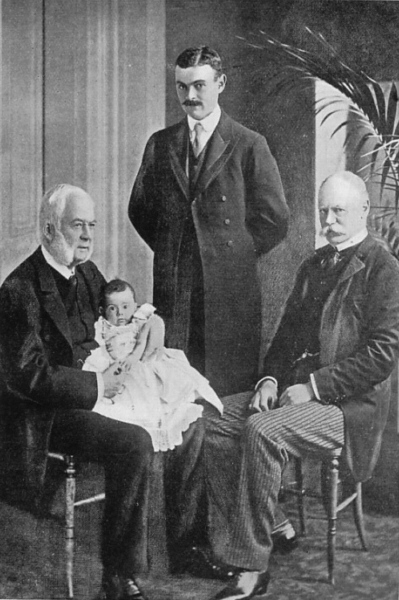
Charles in the arms of his great-grandfather, next to his father and grandfather, c. 1900

Charles Gordon-Lennox was born on 29 January 1899 at 67 Cadogan Square, London, to Lord Settrington and his wife, Hilda Madeline Brassey. Since his elder brother died in infancy in 1895, Charles was heir to the dukedoms of Richmond, Lennox and Gordon, as well as the French dukedom of Aubigny. He was a descendant of King Charles II and his mistress Louise de Kérouaille, Duchess of Portsmouth. From the death of his great-grandfather, the 6th Duke of Richmond, in 1903 he held the courtesy title Lord Settrington. Charles was raised at Molecomb House, a house on the family's Goodwood Estate in West Sussex.

In 1903, at the age of four, he attended the ninth birthday party of Prince Edward of Wales, the future King Edward VIII and later Duke of Windsor. In 1911, he was his grandfather's page at the coronation of King George V. His grandfather, the 7th Duke of Richmond, carried the Sceptre with Dove.

He was educated at Eton College and the Royal Military College, Sandhurst.

== Military service ==
=== World War I ===
On 26 October 1916, Settrington received a commission in the Irish Guards with the rank of second lieutenant. He was later raised to the rank of lieutenant on 22 July 1917.

Prior to being deployed, his girlfriends included actresses Joyce Barbour and Faith Celli, to the disapproval of his mother.

On 13 April 1918, after three days under heavy enemy artillery fire, Settrington went missing in action during the Battle of Hazebrouck. He had been captured by the Germans and remained a prisoner of war at Karlsruhe until the Armistice of 11 November 1918. He returned to England in December 1918.

=== Russian Civil War ===
After the October Revolution, the Allies intervened in the Russian Civil War on the side of the White movement. Bored with civilian life, Settrington volunteered with the 45th Battalion of the Royal Fusiliers and was deployed to North Russia as part of the North Russia intervention.

On 10 August 1919, British troops advanced to the Northern Dvina, southeast of Arkhangelsk, and attacked the Bolshevik positions. They captured the villages of Sludka and Lypovets. That evening, the company, with the 16th Company of D Platoon as the rear, attempted to link up with the main Allied force, burdened with villagers, wounded and over 500 released prisoners. On the morning of 11 August, the company was crossing a makeshift bridge over the Sheika River. They came under enemy fire and Settrington was shot in the chest, falling into the river. Settrington, along with three other soldiers, were pulled from the river by Arthur Sullivan, an action for which he was awarded the Victoria Cross.

== Death and legacy ==
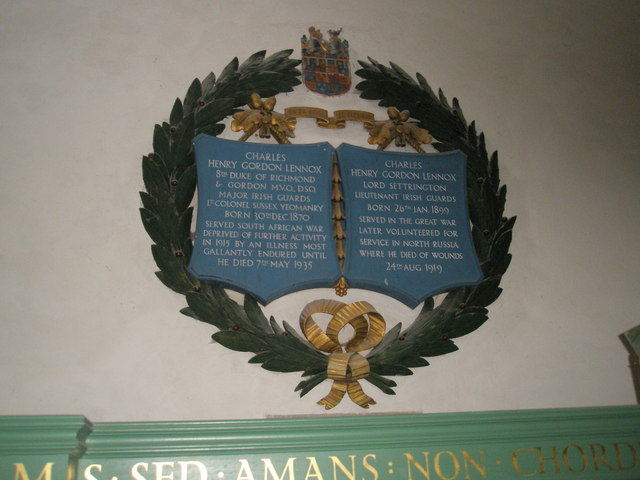
Memorial plaque to Settrington and his father in the Church of St Mary and St Blaise, Boxgrove

Settrington died of his injuries in Bereznik, Severnaya Oblast, on 24 August 1919 at the age of 20. He was buried in the Imperial War Graves Commission's Archangel Allied Cemetery. A memorial service was held in London at the Guards' Chapel, Wellington Barracks.

Settrington was considered the first love of Lady Elizabeth Bowes-Lyon, the future Queen Mother, a close friend of his sister, Lady Doris. Upon his death, Bowes-Lyon called him "my only true friend", writing: "I was not shy about him and he was so delightful. It's terrible, and his family just adored him. He was completely unique and always said what he thought [...] Charlie was the only one I could talk to in a completely natural and simple way – he was dear to me, and I miss him very much".

A memorial plaque to Settrington and his father was erected in the Church of St Mary and St Blaise, Boxgrove, near Goodwood.

== Bibliography ==
- Milne, J. Hogarth (1914). Great Britain in the Coronation Year. London: W. H. Allen & Company Limited.
- Dod's Peerage, Baronetage & Knightage. London: Simkin, Marshall, Hamilton, Kent & Co., Ltd. 1918.
- Singleton-Gates, GR (1920). Bolos & Barishynas. Aldershot: Gale & Polden.
- Kipling, Rudyard (1923). The Irish Guards in the Great War. New York: Doubleday, Page & Company.
- Quinlivian, Peter (2006). Forgotten Valour: The Story of Arthur Sullivan V.C. New Holland. ISBN 9781741104868.
- Challinger, Michael (2010). Anzacs in Arkhangel: The Untold Story of Australia and the Invasion of Russia 1918-19. Hardie Grant Books. ISBN 9781740667517.
- Murland, Jerry (2010). Aristocrats Go to War: Uncovering the Zillebeke Churchyard Cemetery. Pen & Sword Military.
- Shawcross, William, ed. (2012). Counting One's Blessings: The Selected Letters of Queen Elizabeth the Queen Mother. Farrar, Straus and Giroux. ISBN 9780374185220.
