= List of consuls-general of Peru in Dubai =

Consul General of Peru in Dubai
- Great Seal of Peru
- Ministry of Foreign Affairs; Al Habtoor Business Tower, F-25, Dubai
- Appointer: The president of Peru
- Inaugural holder: Rómulo Acurio Traverso
- Formation: 2011
- Website: Consulate General of Peru in Dubai

The consul general of Peru in Dubai is the official representative of the Republic of Peru to the United Arab Emirates.

The Peruvian consulate-general in Dubai was opened in 2011. The United Arab Emirates have an embassy in Lima, which opened in March 2016, and is accredited to neighbouring Ecuador and Bolivia.

== List of representatives ==
Name	Portrait	Term begin	Term end	President	Notes
Rómulo Fernando Acurio Traverso		May 1, 2011	2013	Alan García	First Consul-General in Dubai.
Carlos Eduardo Tavera Vega		2013	2019	Ollanta Humala	As Consul General.
Marco Antonio Santivañez Pimentel		August 15, 2019	2026	Martín Vizcarra	As Consul General; accredited to IRENA.

== See also ==
- Peru–United Arab Emirates relations
- List of ambassadors of Peru to Kuwait
- List of ambassadors of Peru to Qatar
- List of ambassadors of Peru to Saudi Arabia
