= Diplomacy Academy, Turkey =

Institute of diplomatic training in Turkey

The Diplomacy Academy is the institute in charge of diplomatic training and academic collaboration operations of Ministry of Foreign Affairs of Turkey. The Academy was originally established as Foreign Affairs Academy in 1968, was later renamed to Training Center in 1994, and eventually took its current designation, "Diplomacy Academy" under the 2010 legal overhaul that redesigned Ministry of Foreign Affairs of Turkey and gave the Academy a larger spectrum of tasks, including:

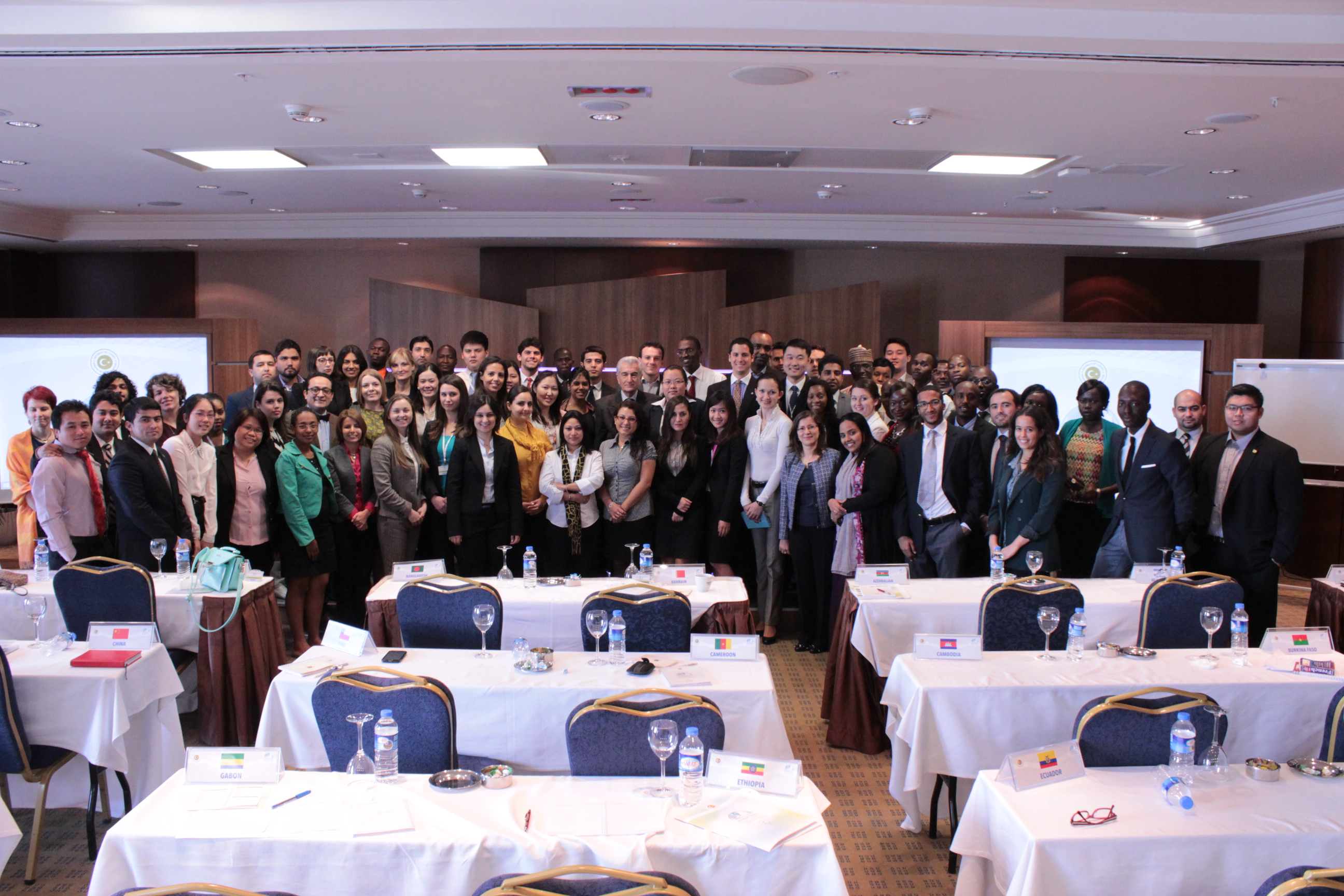
20th International Junior Diplomats Training Program

- train Ministry officers of every service category and rank, including Consuls General and Ambassadors,
- plan and organize attendance to internship and training programs,
- coordinate exchange of diplomats with other Ministries of Foreign Affairs,
- execute training programs for foreign diplomats, including International Junior Diplomats Training Program.
- collaborate with other Diplomatic Academies,
- plan and organize foreign service orientation program for officials from other Turkish government institutions due for overseas posting,
- hold foreign policy and protocol seminars for foreign relations departments of other Turkish government institutes.

International Junior Diplomats Training Program is the Academy's biggest annual undertaking. It has been held every year since 1992, and diplomats from all over the globe are invited for a one-month program covering an overview of Turkish foreign policy, introduction to Turkish history and art, and visits to tourist and cultural spotlights including Cappadocia, Nevşehir, and landmarks of Istanbul.

The Diplomacy Academy is headed by the office of Director, currently held by Assoc. Prof. Mesut Özcan.

== Website ==
- http://diab.mfa.gov.tr/en
