= International School of Protocol and Diplomacy =

International relations school in Brussels, Belgium

Coordinates: 50.84139°N 4.37631°E

ISPD Group
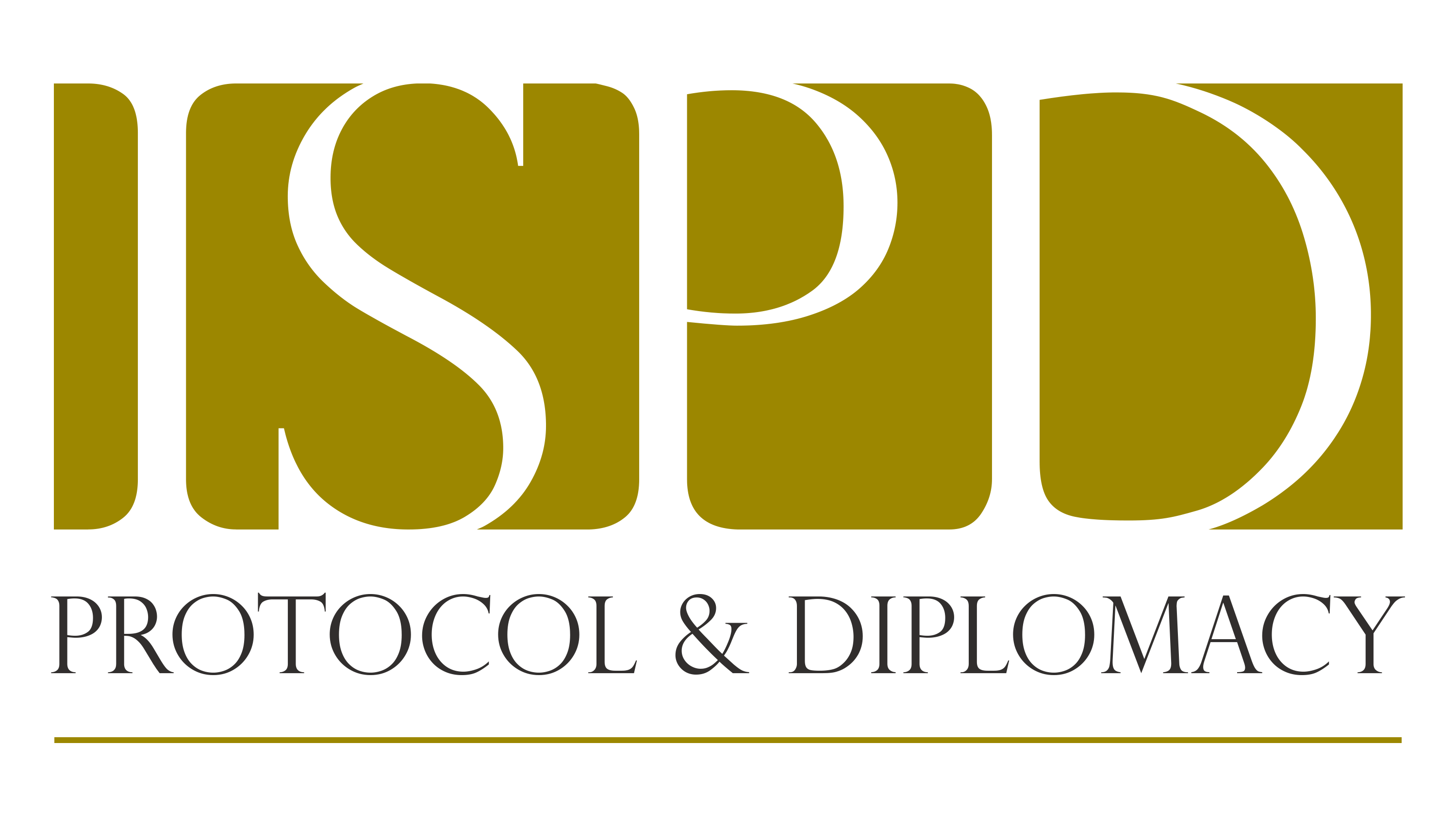
- Formerly: International School of Protocol & Diplomacy
- Founded: 2008
- Founder: Ines Pires
- Headquarters: Brussels, Belgium
- Area served: Worldwide
- Services: Executive Master Programme in Protocol & Soft Diplomacy Skills; Postgraduate Certificate in Protocol; Executive Diplomas; Consultancy; Cross-Cultural Intelligence
- Divisions: Protocol & Diplomacy; Innovation in Diplomacy; Security & Governance; Impact; Certification & Licenses; Skills
- Website: ISPD Group

The ISPD Protocol & Diplomacy (founded in 2008 as The International School of Protocol and Diplomacy) is part of the ISPD Group and an academic institution solely dedicated to research, education, training and consultancy in International Protocol, Soft Diplomacy, Business Protocol, Etiquette, Official Events, Cross-Cultural Intelligence, Strategic Communication and Corporate Diplomacy. As the word “School” is not summarising properly all ISPD related activities the wording was changed and the group does not use the word “School” anymore.

The ISPD combines fields like Protocol, Diplomacy, Soft Diplomatic Skills, Security, Corporate Diplomacy, etc. in order to bring clients and course participants a unique range of study programmes designed and developed by academics from multicultural and interdisciplinary backgrounds. Although born in Brussels, Belgium, the ISPD has representative offices worldwide.

Since the inception in 2008, the ISPD Protocol & Diplomacy has trained over 1200 professionals, including ambassadors, chiefs of protocol and embassy personnel across 104 countries. In addition, the ISPD Protocol & Diplomacy works with more than 60 internationally known experts like the Former Minister for Foreign Affairs of Austria Dr Karin Kneissl; H.E. Dr Luis Ritto former EU Ambassador to the Holy See, Order of Malta, FAO; Captain José Paulo Lucena, Head of Security, Safety and Environment Department at the Portuguese Navy General Inspection; Thomas Sladko, former Deputy Head of Protocol of the Austrian Federal Chancellery; Vazil Hudák, Vice President of the European Investment Bank; Pierre Jirikoff, Senior Advisor of Protocol at the Chamber of Representatives of Belgium; Baron Jacques de Cattier d'Yves, former Protocol Director of the Ministry of Defense; Phillipa Lawrence, former Chief of Protocol of the UN, among many others. ISPD's primary language of instruction is English, but it also provides lectures on other languages on demand. Its method of teaching is based on both face2face training and online learning platform for students in distant parts of the world.

== History ==
ISPD has delivered tailor made training projects around the world for Expo2020 Dubai/UAE, the Pentagon, Umicore, EU Agency Frontex, Abu Dhabi Crowne Prince Court, ICD (Institute of Capacity Development) of Diwan of Royal Court (Oman), DG (Deutschsprachige Gemeinschaft der Belgier), OBF (Oman Business Forum), OSCE, European Commission, European Parliament, ECHA (European Chemistry Agency), ESMA (European Security & Markets Authority), Teneo Cabinet DN, G4S, Oman Aviation Services and many others.

ISPD's activities include Soft Diplomacy and all the related areas like Protocol, Event Organisation, Cross-Cultural Intelligence, Corporate Diplomacy, Interfaith Dialogue, Conflict Resolution, Public Diplomacy, Soft Diplomacy Skills, Military Protocol, Politician Intelligence, Sports Protocol, Negotiation Skills, Cross-Cultural Awareness, Media Relations, Strategic Communication and Cross-Cultural Communication.

== Accomplishments ==
- According to the Journal of International Diplomatic Higher Education, “the ISPD is the first international institution of diplomatic and protocolar higher education to offer an executive master degree in protocol, business and foreign relations thus giving it an enviable and exclusively unique niche in diplomacy’s intimate sister statecraft, protocol. The ISPD’s masters degree in protocol programme is only the more elevated on the scale of exclusivity, prestige and privilege by its access to the Brussels, EU and larger euro-continental diplomatic communities at The Hague and in Paris, London and Geneva.”
- In 2013 ISPD Founder and Chair Ines Pires was nominated by the Sabado Magazin among the most innovative Portuguese living abroad.
- In 2015 the ISPD held the first Business Protocol and Corporate Diplomacy Conference in Muscat, Sultanate of Oman.
- In 2017 ISPD Group was honoured with the Medal of the State Council of the Sultanate of Oman.
- In 2019 the ISPD published the book: "Soft Diplomacy - Modelling Global Interactions".
