= José Antonio García Belaúnde =

Peruvian politician (1948–2025)

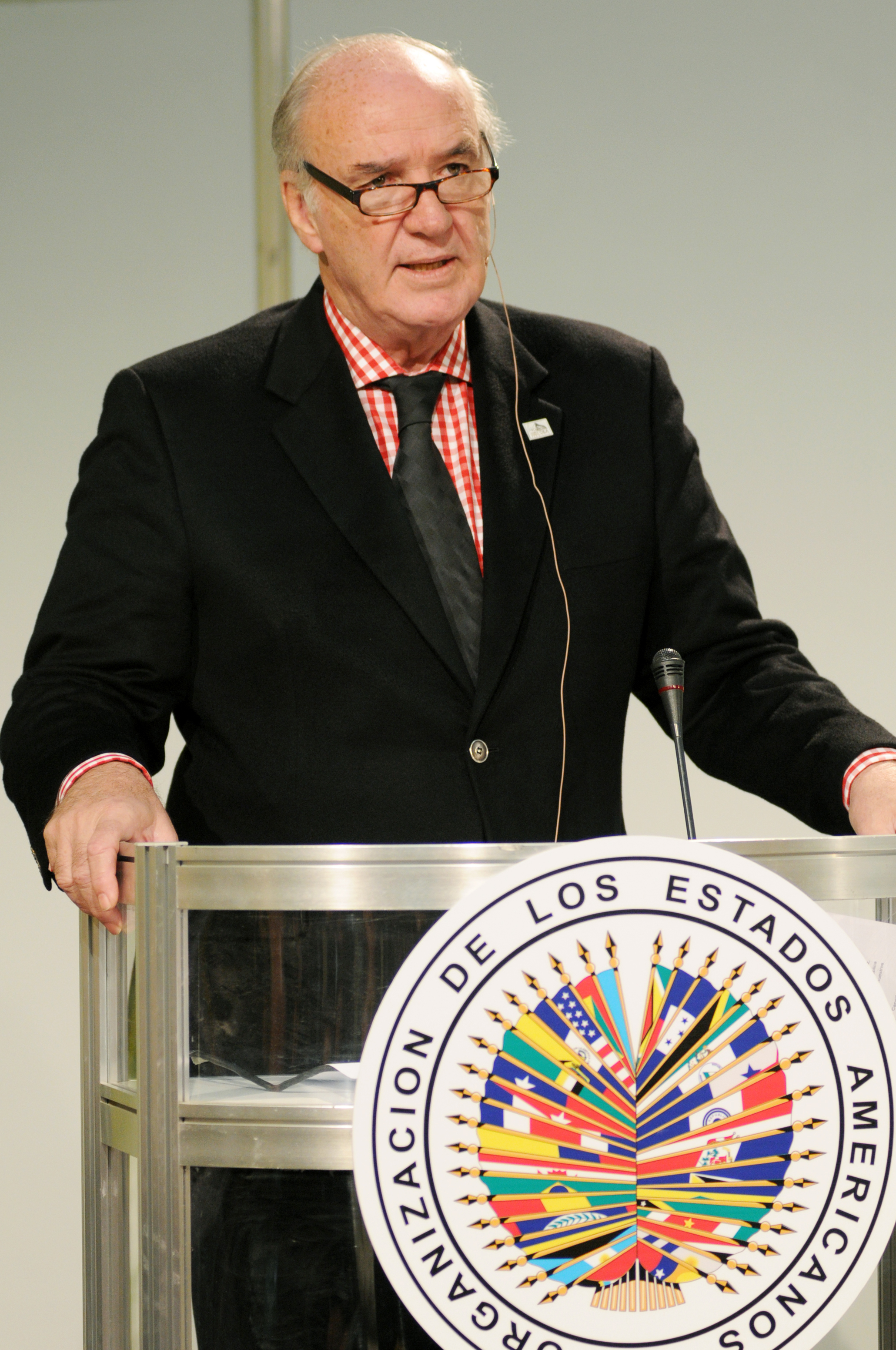

Minister of Foreign Relations of Peru
- In office 28 July 2006 – 28 July 2011
- President: Alan García
- Preceded by: Óscar Maúrtua
- Succeeded by: Rafael Roncagliolo

Personal details
- Born: José Antonio García Belaúnde; 16 March 1948 Lima, Peru
- Died: 4 July 2025 (aged 77)
- Party: Independent
- Profession: Diplomat, politician

José Antonio García Belaúnde (Spanish: [xoˈse anˈtonjo ɣaɾˈsi.a βelaˈunde]; 16 March 1948 – 4 July 2025) was a Peruvian career diplomat, who served as foreign minister during the second presidency of Alan García from 2006 to 2011, making him the only foreign minister to serve a complete term. On 2 August 2011, his successor in office, Rafael Roncagliolo, announced his appointment as Peru's co-agent before the International Court of Justice in The Hague.

In 2016, President Pedro Pablo Kuczynski appointed him ambassador to Spain where he served until 2018, when he assumed the post of Representative to Europe for the CAF – Development Bank of Latin America and the Caribbean.

== Early life and education ==
García Belaúnde was born in Lima on 16 March 1948. He was the son of distinguished jurist Domingo García Rada, who presided the Supreme Court (1967–1968) and grandson of Víctor Andrés Belaúnde, a Peruvian diplomat who was President of the United Nations General Assembly in 1959. His brother, Víctor Andrés García Belaúnde, is a former congressman and politician, and his uncle, Fernando Belaúnde Terry, was elected President of Peru twice.

He studied at Colegio de la Inmaculada in Lima and then in Colegio Winnetka. He studied Literature and Linguistics at Pontifical Catholic University of Peru, where he became a close friend of future president Alan García. He earned a Post Graduate Diploma in Foreign Policy from the University of Oxford, and also attended the Diplomatic Academy of Peru, graduating with a BA in International Relations. He held a master's degree in international relations, International Law and International Economics at Instituto Universitario Ortega y Gasset in Madrid.

== Career ==
In July 2006, García Belaúnde became Peru's minister of foreign affairs. During his mandate, Peru submitted a maritime delimitation dispute with Chile to the International Court of Justice (ICJ) in The Hague. The ruling was mostly favorable to Peru. Prior to the final decision of the ICJ, Peru signed a maritime delimitation agreement with Ecuador. He recounts his experiences in "El largo camino a La Haya", published in El Comercio, Lima, 29 January 2014.

Peru also finalized a Free Trade Agreement with the United States which was approved by Congress, and also signed FTAs with the European Union, China, Japan, et al. With President García's leadership, he launched the Pacific Alliance, a Latin American regional integration initiative. He negotiated with Yale University the recuperation of prehispanic pottery and artifacts from Machu Picchu that had been lent to the university one hundred years before. Also, during this period, Peru was a non-permanent member of the United Nations Security Council (2006–2007). He died on 4 July 2025, aged 77.

=== Diplomatic career ===
García Belaúnde served at the Permanent Mission of Peru to the United Nations, as well as in the embassies in France, Mexico, Spain, Ecuador, the United States of America and the Latin American Free Trade Association, ALADI, in Uruguay. He also served as Director-Secretario and Director General at the Andean Community (1990–2006).

== Academic activities ==
García Belaúnde was a lecturer at the Academia Diplomática del Perú and at the Instituto de Gobierno y Gestión Pública de la Universidad de San Martín de Porres. He prologued and edited Política Exterior Peruana. Teoría y práctica, by Carlos García Bedoya, Mosca Azul Editores, Lima, 1981, and wrote Carlos García Bedoya: el primer decenio, Mosca Azul Editores, Lima, 1993.

He published Dos siglos de desafíos en la política exterior peruana as part of the Colección Nudos de la República, Biblioteca Bicentenario, Lima, 2021.

== Death ==
Garcia Belaunde died on 4 July 2025, at the age of 77.

== Sources ==
- List of his Diplomatic posts
