= El Olivar =

El Olivar may refer to:

- El Olivar, Peru
- El Olivar, Spain
- Olivar, in Chile
