= Algeria–Peru relations =

Algeria-Peru relations
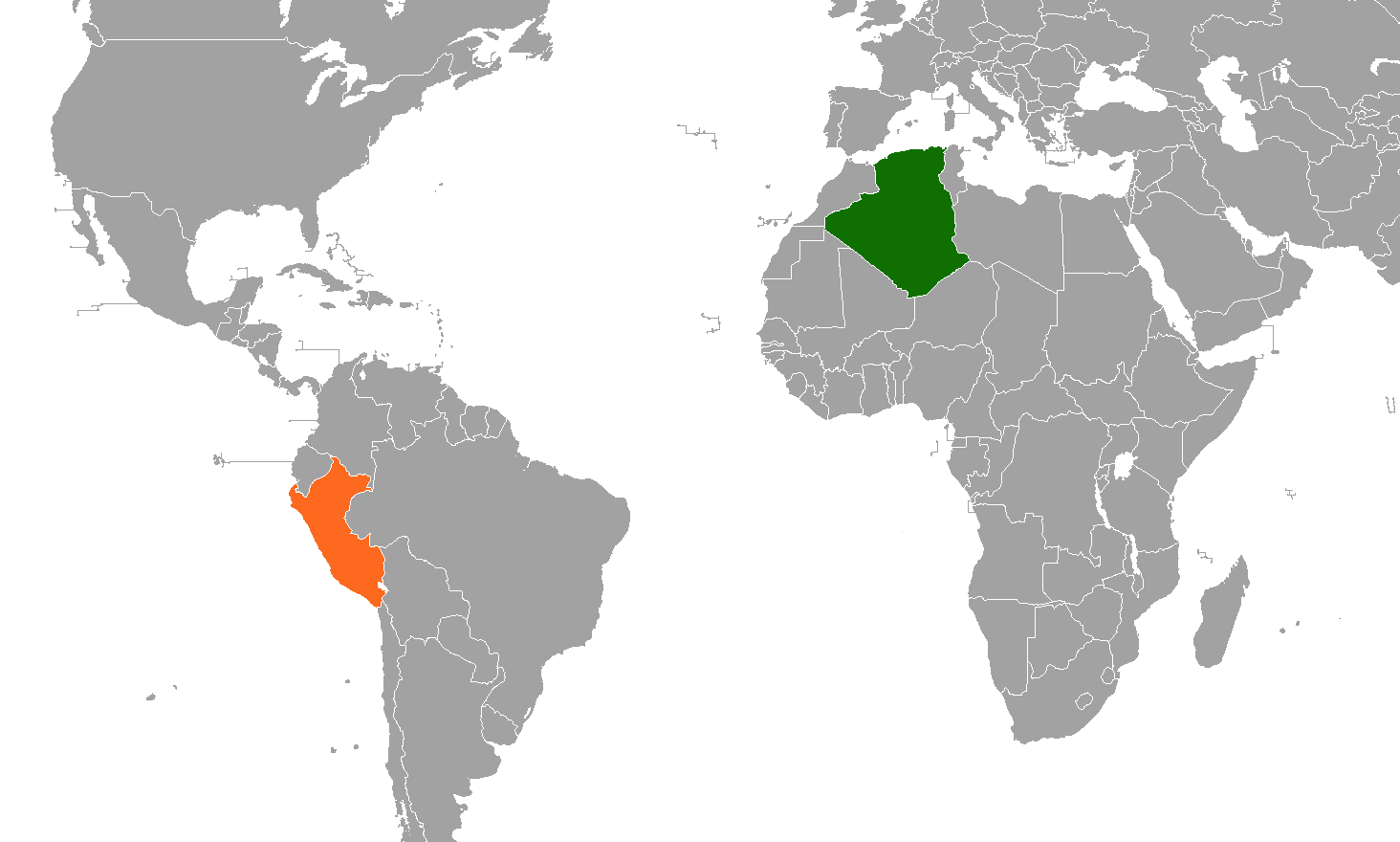
- Algeria: Peru

Diplomatic mission
- Embassy of Algeria, Lima: Embassy of Peru, Algiers

Algeria–Peru relations are the bilateral relations between Algeria and Peru. Both countries are members of the United Nations and the Non-Aligned Movement.

== History ==
Algeria and Peru established diplomatic relations on March 10, 1972, when these countries were governed by Houari Boumedienne and Juan Velasco Alvarado, respectively. Before the establishment of diplomatic relations, Peru had maintained a consulate in French Algeria since the 19th century as part of its diplomatic relations with France. The establishment of relations with Morocco in 1964 led to the embassy in Rabat being accredited to both Algeria and Tunisia.

In 1985, Algeria began a foreign policy aimed at the recognition of the Sahrawi Arab Democratic Republic by Latin American countries, which led to the Peruvian recognition of the state in 1987.

The Peruvian embassy in Algiers opened in 1972, but it closed in 1990 until it reopened in 2005, the same year a series of treaties was signed between both countries as part of the strengthening of their relations.

At the legislative level there is a Parliamentary League of Peruvian-Algerian Friendship.

== Trade ==
Algeria and Peru maintain an important commercial exchange. Algeria imports 47 million dollars a year in Peruvian products, which represents 47.3 percent of the total imports from the Arab world to Peru. Algerian investments in Peru amount to nearly one billion dollars, mainly in the hydrocarbons sector.

== High-level visits ==
High-level visits from Algeria to Peru

- President Abdelaziz Bouteflika (2005)

== Resident diplomatic missions ==
- Algeria has an embassy in Lima.
- Peru has an embassy in Algiers.

== See also ==
- Foreign relations of Algeria
- Foreign relations of Peru
- List of ambassadors of Algeria to Peru
- List of ambassadors of Peru to Algeria
