= List of ambassadors of Peru to Morocco =

Ambassador of Peru to the Kingdom of Morocco
- Great Seal of Peru
- Ministry of Foreign Affairs
- Appointer: The president of Peru
- Inaugural holder: Adhemar Montagne
- Formation: 1963
- Website: Embassy of Peru in Morocco

The extraordinary and plenipotentiary ambassador of Peru to the Kingdom of Morocco is the official representative of the Republic of Peru to the Kingdom of Morocco.

The ambassador in Rabat is accredited to neighbouring Mauritania and Senegal, and has also been accredited to Equatorial Guinea, Ivory Coast and Mali.

Both countries established relations in 1964, and have maintained them since. After the unavailability of a chargé d'affaires in Morocco, the embassy in Rabat was closed from 1973 to 1986. During this time, the ambassador in Madrid was accredited to the country, and Peru established diplomatic relations with the Sahrawi Arab Democratic Republic, which did not appear to disturb its relations with Morocco.

== List of representatives ==
Name	Portrait	Term begin	Term end	President	Notes
Adhemar Montagne		1963	1966	Fernando Belaúnde	First representative of Peru to Morocco, resident in Cairo. Previously the ambassador to Lebanon, accredited to the "Arabian countries" from 1957 to 1962.
Alejandro Gordillo Fernández		1985	after 1990	Alan García	First ambassador to Morocco; accredited to Equatorial Guinea, Ivory Coast and Senegal.
Tomás Castillo Meza		1997	2001	Alberto Fujimori	Retired Division general of the Peruvian Army and thus, a political ambassador; accredited to Mali.
Jorge Abarca del Carpio		January 1, 2002	July 1, 2007	Alejandro Toledo	As ambassador.
Luis Manuel Santiago Marcovich Monasi		September 1, 2007	2012	Alan García	As ambassador.
Carlos Manuel Alfredo Velasco Mendiola		April 1, 2013	2016	Ollanta Humala	As ambassador.
Carlos Polo Castañeda		July 19, 2016	2019	Ollanta Humala	As ambassador.
Arturo Chipoco Caceda		April 1, 2019	2026	Martín Vizcarra	As ambassador; accredited to Mauritania and Senegal.

== See also ==
- List of ambassadors of Morocco to Peru
- List of ambassadors of Peru to Algeria
- List of ambassadors of Peru to Egypt
- List of ambassadors of Peru to Spain
