= Embassy of Morocco, Lima =

Diplomatic mission of Morocco to Peru

Embassy of Morocco in Peru
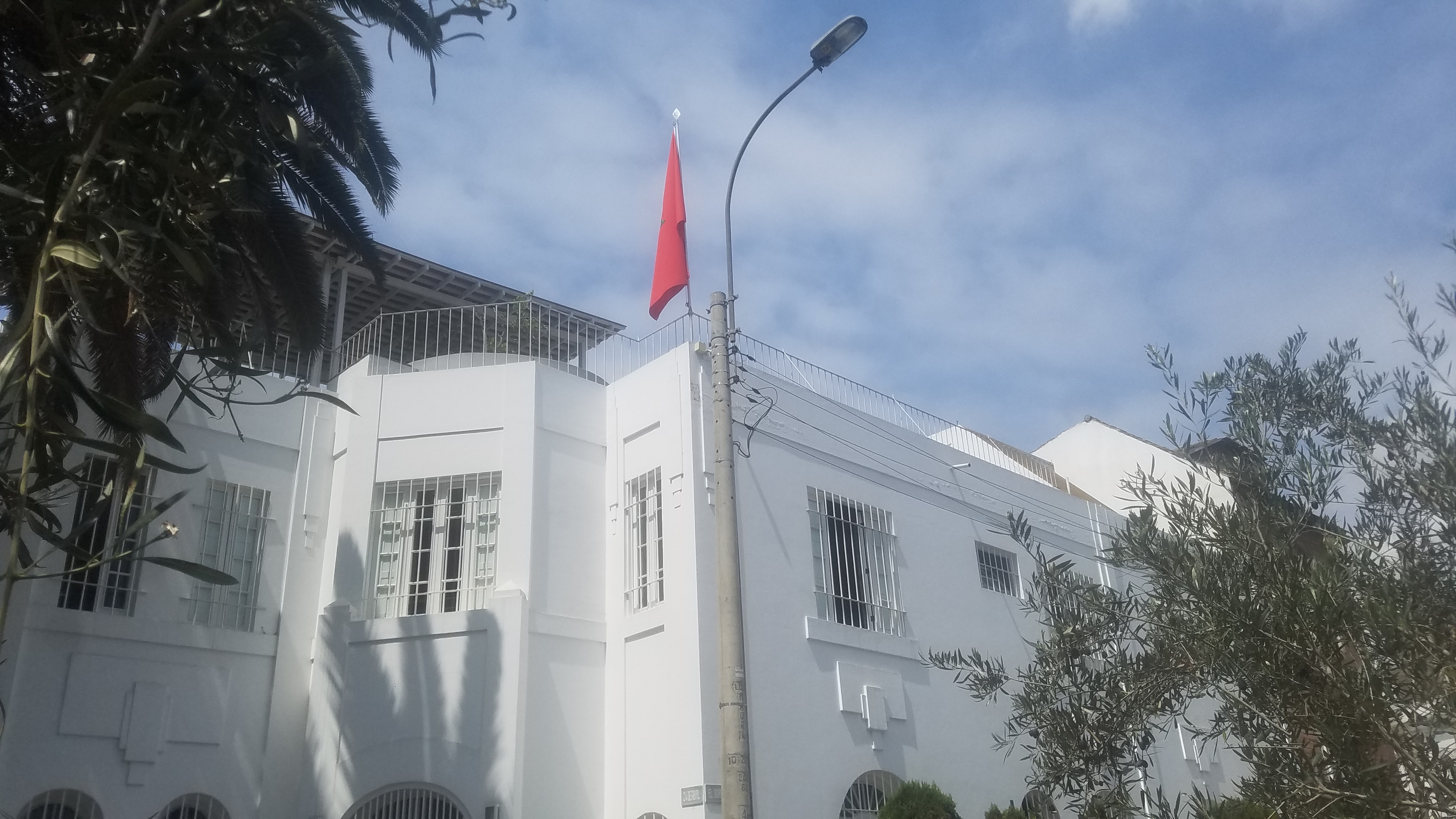
- Location: Lima, Peru
- Address: Calle 24 de abril 195
- Opened: 1986
- Ambassador: Amin Chaoudri

Cultural Heritage of Peru
- Designated: December 2, 1998
- Part of: El Olivar Monumental Zone
- Legal basis: R.D.N. Nº 410/INC

The Embassy of Morocco in Peru represents the permanent diplomatic mission of the Kingdom of Morocco to the Republic of Peru, also being accredited to the Plurinational State of Bolivia. The chancery, part of the Cultural heritage of Peru, is located at 195 Calle 24 de abril, El Olivar, San Isidro District, Lima.

The current ambassador of Morocco to Peru since 2019 is Amin Chaoudri.

== History ==
Both countries established relations in 1964, and have maintained them since. Although generally amicable, relations between both countries have been affected by the Western Sahara conflict and twice by the establishment of relations between Peru and the Sahrawi Arab Democratic Republic.

The first Moroccan ambassador, resident in Washington, D.C., was appointed in 1966. The embassy in Lima opened its doors in 1986, with Mohamed Ben Mufti being appointed and assuming office in June of the same year. The chancery is part of El Olivar Monumental Zone, a protected area and neighbourhood located in San Isidro District, thus forming part of the Cultural heritage of Peru.

=== Residence ===
The ambassador's residence is located in Las Casuarinas, an exclusive neighbourhood of Santiago de Surco.

== List of representatives ==
The Moroccan ambassador to Peru is the highest diplomatic representative of Morocco to the Government of Peru.

Ambassador	Start time	End time	Monarch	Notes
1966: Accreditation from Washington, D.C. established
See list
1986: Embassy in Lima opened
Mohamed Ben Mufti	June 1986	?	Hassan II	First resident ambassador in Lima.
Taieb Chaoudri	September 12, 1994	1999?	Hassan II	
Mustapha Ziane	1999?	2001?	Hassan II	As chargé d'affaires.
Mahmoud Rmiki	February 14, 2001	2004	Mohammed VI	Rmiki was appointed to Mexico in 2004, leaving for the country the following year.
Abderrahim Mohandis	c. 2005	2008	Mohammed VI	
Oumama Aouad Lahrech	January 8, 2009	September 2016	Mohammed VI	
Youssef Balla	May 16, 2017	2019	Mohammed VI	
Amin Chaoudri	August 5, 2019	Incumbent	Mohammed VI	

== See also ==
- Morocco–Peru relations
- List of ambassadors of Peru to Morocco
- List of ambassadors of the Sahrawi Arab Democratic Republic to Peru
