= List of ambassadors of Peru to Ghana =

Ambassador of Peru to Ghana
- Great Seal of Peru
- Ministry of Foreign Affairs
- Style: Her Excellency
- Appointer: The president of Peru
- Inaugural holder: Eliot Gaviria Valverde (as Chargé d'affaires)
- Formation: 2014
- Website: Embassy of Peru in Ghana

The ambassador of Peru to Ghana is the official representative of the Republic of Peru to the Republic of Ghana.

Both countries established diplomatic relations on June 23, 1987. Peru has an embassy in Accra since 2014, which it shares with other members of the Pacific Alliance.

The embassy is one of two embassies of Peru in Sub-Saharan Africa, the other being in Pretoria, South Africa, since the closure of three embassies in Kenya, Zambia, and Zimbabwe in 1990.

== List of representatives ==
Name	Term begin	Term end	President	Notes
Eliot Gaviria Valverde	October 29, 2014	2016	Ollanta Humala	First representative of Peru as chargé d'affaires.
Patricia Yolanda Raez Portocarrero	2017	2019	Pedro Pablo Kuczynski	As chargé d'affaires.
Abel Antonio Cárdenas Tuppia	January 1, 2020	2023	Martín Vizcarra	As chargé d'affaires and head of mission. He has been described as an ambassador by local media.
Rosa Liliana Gómez Cárdenas de Weston	2023	2026	Dina Boluarte	As first formal ambassador.

== See also ==
- List of ambassadors of Peru to South Africa
