= Egypt–Peru relations =

- Egypt: Peru

Diplomatic mission
- Embassy of Egypt, Lima: Embassy of Peru, Cairo

Egypt–Peru relations are the bilateral and diplomatic ties between the Arab Republic of Egypt and the Republic of Peru. Both countries are members of the United Nations, the Non-Aligned Movement, the World Trade Organization and the Group of 24. Relations between both countries are described by the Egyptian Ministry of Foreign Affairs as "excellent" as both countries share a similar history, especially since the latter half of the 20th century.

== History ==
Peru and the United Arab Republic first established relations on October 7, 1963, with the Arab country being the first with which Peru established relations in Africa. Due to the revolutionary nature of both countries' governments at the time, relations became close from the beginning. The Egyptian embassy in Lima opened the same year relations were established, with the Peruvian mission being the oldest in the continent.

During the Japanese embassy hostage crisis, the Egyptian ambassador, Sami Tewfik, was among the initial hundreds held hostage by the MRTA.

In 2012, Peru hosted the third Summit of South American-Arab Countries in Lima. Egypt was represented in the summit by a delegation, as well as by the presence of the Arab League's Secretary General, Nabil Elaraby, who inaugurated the event alongside Peruvian president Ollanta Humala.

A parliamentary league of Peruvian–Egyptian Cooperation exists in Peru.

Following the events that collapsed the government of Syria in late 2024, the Ministry of Foreign Affairs of Peru requested that Peruvian citizens in the country contact the Egyptian embassy in Damascus.

== High-level visits ==
High-level visits from Egypt to Peru

- Minister Zahi Hawass (2011)
- Secretary General Nabil Elaraby (2012)

High-level visits from Peru to Egypt

- Foreign Minister Manuel Rodríguez Cuadros (2004)
- Foreign Minister José Antonio García Belaúnde (2009)

== Trade ==
In 2022, trade between both countries reached US$ 28 million, with the trade balance being in favour of Egypt. This number shows a steady increase when compared to previous years. Imports to Peru include glasses, potassium, vegetables, and white cement. Imports to Egypt include copper compounds, Karimine, fruits, and nuts.

== Cultural ==
Cultural ties between Egypt and Peru are the strong point of their relations. Both countries have signed treaties promoting cultural cooperation and the prevention of archaeological looting with each other, starting with the first treaty in 1974. In 2015, a treaty was signed between the National Library of Peru and the Bibliotheca Alexandrina, to promote cooperation between both entities.

== Resident diplomatic missions ==
- Egypt has an embassy in Lima.
- Peru has an embassy in Cairo.

== See also ==
- Foreign relations of Egypt
- Foreign relations of Peru
- List of ambassadors of Egypt to Peru
- List of ambassadors of Peru to Egypt
