= Morocco–Peru relations =

- Morocco: Peru

Diplomatic mission
- Embassy of Morocco, Lima: Embassy of Peru, Rabat

Morocco–Peru relations refers to the current and historical relations between the Republic of Peru and the Kingdom of Morocco. Both countries are members of the Non-Aligned Movement, the World Trade Organization and the United Nations.

Although generally amicable, relations between both countries have been affected by the Western Sahara conflict, specifically the establishment of relations between Peru and the Sahrawi Arab Democratic Republic.

== History ==
Relations were officially established on June 27, 1964, during the governments of Peruvian president Fernando Belaúnde and Hassan II of Morocco. The embassy, concurrently accredited to Algeria and Tunisia, was inaugurated by diplomat Adhemar Montagne Sánchez.

The 2004 visit of Mohammed VI to Peru, the first Arab, Muslim and African Head of State in the South American country, led to the strengthening of Peruvian-Moroccan relations.

In 1999, and from 2012 to the present day, Peru has sent troops to the United Nations Mission for the Referendum in Western Sahara.

In 2014, the Peruvian president Ollanta Humala, through a representative in Rabat, gave a speech on the relations both countries in front of the then prime minister Abdelilah Benkirane. The Moroccan government created a public space in Rabat called Peru Plaza.

In 2019, the then President of the Congress of Peru, Daniel Salaverry, stated that "Peru has maintained diplomatic relations with Morocco for more than fifty years. Time during which these ties have been strengthened through delegations that have visited both countries" in front of the Moroccan ambassador Youssef Balla.

On May 10, 2023, the embassy of Morocco in Lima held the first edition of the Lima Caftan Fashion Show, a charity event dedicated to improving the services of the National Institute of Child Health (NICH) in Breña.

=== Western Sahara conflict ===
Peru maintained an embassy in Rabat, which closed from 1973 to 1986 due to the unavailability of a chargé d'affaires. During this time, the ambassador in Madrid was accredited to the country, and Peru established diplomatic relations with the Sahrawi Arab Democratic Republic (SADR), which did not appear to disturb its relations with Morocco.

After relations with the SADR were frozen in 1996, Peru maintained an ambiguous position on the recognition of the Sahrawi Arab Democratic Republic, maintaining a de facto legitimization from the government of Alberto Fujimori (1990-2000) to the Moroccan occupation of Western Sahara, which is not unrecognized by the international community. This position was seen again when in September 2017 the representative of the SADR, Khadijetou El Mokhtar, was prohibited from leaving Jorge Chávez International Airport. El Mohtar had to meet with the then president Pedro Pablo Kuczynski, which ultimately did not happen.

On September 9, 2021, during the government of Pedro Castillo, Peru re-established diplomatic relations with the SADR, which was criticised by the Congress of Peru.

In 2022, the Peruvian Ministry of Foreign Affairs announced that it suspended its relations with the SADR and that it instead "values the territorial integrity of the Kingdom of Morocco," also mentioning that it would improve its relations with the country through commercial trade, including fertilizer. This particular item was highlighted by some commentators, who noted that the Moroccan-controlled area of Western Sahara are home to the largest open-air phosphate mines in the world, with phosphate being fundamental in the manufacturing of fertilizers. Despite this, relations were again re-established with the SADR in September of the same year before being suspended once again about one year later in 2023.

During the 81st session of the United Nations General Assembly on 25 September 2026 in New York, Moroccan Minister of Foreign Affairs Nasser Bourita met with his Peruvian counterpart, Carlos Espá , resulting in a joint communiqué that officially declared Peru’s support for Morocco’s territorial integrity and sovereignty over Western Sahara. Reaffirming its adherence to UN Security Council Resolution 2797, Peru endorsed the Moroccan Autonomy Initiative as a viable political settlement for the region, joining a broader international movement of over 150 UN member states and 25 EU member nations backing Rabat's stance. As part of this diplomatic realignment and revitalized bilateral ties, Peru announced plans to open a commercial consulate in Dakhla to facilitate trade access into African markets.

== High-level visits ==
High-level visit from Morocco to Peru

- Foreign minister Mohamed Benaissa (2003)
- Minister Abdelkader Aamara (2012)
- Foreign minister Salaheddine Mezouar (2014)

== Trade ==
The commercial exchange between Morocco and Peru in the mid-2010s reached US$ 24 million. In 2015, the governments of both countries began talks for the creation of a free trade agreement. In 2024, bilateral trade between Morocco and Peru reached over $149 million, with Peru maintaining a trade surplus driven by $93.3 million in exports to Morocco, led primarily by petroleum gas ($56.3 million), compared to $56.1 million in imports from Morocco, which consisted mostly of calcium phosphates ($39.6 million). Trade velocity between the two nations continued to accelerate through 2026, with cumulative exports from Morocco reaching $86.3 million by August 2026 (an 11.3% year-over-year increase) alongside $1.11 billion in total imports from Peru, reflecting an expanding long-term economic integration.

== Resident diplomatic missions ==
- Morocco has an embassy in Lima.
- Peru has an embassy in Rabat.

== See also ==
- Foreign relations of Morocco
- Foreign relations of Peru
- List of ambassadors of Morocco to Peru
- List of ambassadors of Peru to Morocco
