= Ghana–Peru relations =

Ghana-Peru relations
- Ghana: Peru

Diplomatic mission
- None (Accredited from Brasília): Embassy of Peru, Accra

Ghana–Peru relations are the bilateral relations between the Republic of Ghana and the Republic of Peru. Ghana is accredited to Peru from its embassy in Brasília, Brazil, while Peru has an embassy in Accra. Both countries are members of the United Nations and the Non-Aligned Movement. Peru's embassy in Ghana is one of two embassies of Peru in Sub-Saharan Africa, the other being in Pretoria, South Africa, since the closure of three embassies in Kenya, Zambia, and Zimbabwe in 1990.

== History ==
Relations between both countries date back to the Conquista and the era of the Viceroyalty of Peru, as a number of African slaves came from the region.

Both countries established diplomatic relations on June 23, 1987. Peru has an embassy in Accra since 2013, which it shares with other members of the Pacific Alliance. A consulate was opened by Peru in the coastal city of Tema in 2015.

In 2015, a Peruvian delegation headed by Carlos Pareja Ríos visited Accra to further bilateral relations, as well as to formally inaugurate the Peruvian embassy in the state. In 2016, a Ghanaian delegation visited Peru in order to further trade between both states.

== Trade ==
In 2020, Peruvian exports to Ghana totaled a value of US$ 17.8 million, which represented a growth of 229% in relation to 2019. On the same year, the trade balance between the two countries was US$ 17.5 million, a growth of 276% in relation to the previous year.

== Resident diplomatic missions ==
- Ghana is accredited to Peru from its embassy in Brasília. It also has an honorary consulate in Lima.
- Peru has an embassy in Accra and an honorary consulate in Tema.

== See also ==
- Foreign relations of Ghana
- Foreign relations of Peru
- List of ambassadors of Peru to Ghana
