= List of ambassadors of South Africa to Peru =

Ambassador of South Africa to Peru
- Ministry of Foreign Affairs
- Style: His Excellency
- Appointer: The president
- Inaugural holder: Johann Kilian
- Formation: 1998
- Final holder: Nomonde Rasmeni
- Abolished: April 2021

The ambassador of South Africa to Peru is the official representative of the Republic of South Africa to the Republic of Peru. The resident ambassador in Lima was also accredited to Ecuador.

Both countries reestablished relations in 1994, and have maintained them since. (Note: Relations were only established after the end of Apartheid.) Peru opened an embassy in Pretoria in 1994 (Note: The embassy was preceded by a consulate in Cape Town which closed in 1985.) and South Africa maintained an embassy in Lima from 1998 to 2021, being since accredited from its embassy in Santiago de Chile.

== List of representatives ==
Name	Term begin	Term end	President	Notes
Johann Kilian	1998	2002	Nelson Mandela	First resident ambassador in Lima.
2003: Vacant
Chris Streeter	2005	2008	Thabo Mbeki	Streeter took part in the 2005 inauguration of the first Afro-Peruvian museum in the country. He is married to Judy Streeter.
Albert Leslie Manley	2008	2011	Thabo Mbeki	He presented his credentials on July 24, 2008.
Elsie Jacoba Dry	2012	after 2014?	Jacob Zuma	She presented her credentials on December 13, 2012.
Nomonde Rasmeni	2017	2021	Jacob Zuma	Final resident ambassador of South Africa in Lima. She presented her credentials on October 5, 2017.
Since 2021: Accredited from Chile

== See also ==
- List of ambassadors of Peru to South Africa
