= List of ambassadors of Peru to South Africa =

Ambassador of Peru to South Africa
- Great Seal of Peru
- Ministry of Foreign Affairs
- Appointer: The president of Peru
- Inaugural holder: Jorge Valdez Carrillo
- Formation: 1994
- Website: Embassy of Peru in South Africa

The extraordinary and plenipotentiary ambassador of Peru to the Republic of South Africa is the official representative of the Republic of Peru to the Republic of South Africa.

The ambassador in South Africa is also accredited to "Sub-Saharan Africa". While this term is not defined, the embassy is explicitly accredited to Mozambique and Zambia. (Note: Peru maintained embassies in Harare and Lusaka until 1990.)

Both countries reestablished relations in 1994, and have maintained them since. (Note: Relations were only established after the end of Apartheid.) Peru opened an embassy in Pretoria in 1994 and South Africa maintained an embassy in Lima until 2021. (Note: The embassy was preceded by a consulate in Cape Town which closed in 1985.)

== List of representatives ==
As of 2024, seven ambassadors have serviced the embassy in South Africa.

Name	Portrait	Term begin	Term end	President	Notes
Jorge Valdez Carrillo		January 1994	December 1995	Alberto Fujimori	First ambassador of Peru to South Africa.
Juan José Meier Espinosa		February 1996	August 2000	Alberto Fujimori	As ambassador, also accredited to Zimbabwe.
Amador Velásquez García Monterroso		January 2002	February 2005	Alejandro Toledo	As ambassador.
Félix César Calderón Urtecho		October 2005	June 2008	Alejandro Toledo	As ambassador.
Daúl Jesús Enrique Matute		March 2009	October 2014	Alan García	As ambassador.
Nicolás Alfonso Roncagliolo Higueras		November 15, 2014	February 2018	Ollanta Humala	As ambassador.
Jorge Félix Rubio Correa		December 1, 2018	December 2023	Martín Vizcarra	As ambassador; accredited to Mozambique and Zambia.
Mario Bustamante		December 2023	July 2026	Dina Boluarte	Chargé d'affaires.

== See also ==
- List of ambassadors of South Africa to Peru
- List of ambassadors of Peru to Algeria
- List of ambassadors of Peru to Egypt
- List of ambassadors of Peru to Ghana
- List of ambassadors of Peru to Kenya
