= List of ambassadors of Peru to Egypt =

Ambassador of Peru to the Arab Republic of Egypt
- Great Seal of Peru
- Ministry of Foreign Affairs
- Appointer: The president of Peru
- Inaugural holder: Augusto Morelli Pando
- Formation: 1963 (to the UAR)
- Website: Embassy of Peru in Egypt

The extraordinary and plenipotentiary ambassador of Peru to the Arab Republic of Egypt is the official representative of the Republic of Peru to the Arab Republic of Egypt.

The ambassador in Cairo is generally accredited to neighbouring countries, including Iraq, Iran, Jordan, Lebanon, Sudan and Syria.

Peru and Egypt—then the United Arab Republic—first established relations on October 7, 1963, and have maintained them since.

== List of representatives ==
Name	Portrait	Term begin	Term end	President	Notes
Augusto Morelli Pando		1963	1965	Fernando Belaúnde	First Minister Plenipotentiary of Peru to the United Arab Republic, i.e. Egypt.
Felipe Valdivieso Belaunde		c. 1969	1975	Juan Velasco Alvarado	As ambassador.
Jorge Plasencia Malpica		1984	1986	Fernando Belaúnde	As ambassador.
Claudio Enrique Sosa Voyset		1988	1993	Alan García	As ambassador; concurrent from 1990 in Iraq, Jordan and the Sudan.
Manuel Veramendi y Serra		1993	July 31, 1997	Alberto Fujimori	As ambassador; concurrent to Jordan and the Sudan.
Alberto Tamayo Barrios		1997	June 17, 2000	Alberto Fujimori	As ambassador.
José Fernando Torres-Muga Jiménez		2001	2003	Valentín Paniagua	As ambassador.
César Rolando Castillo Ramírez		2004	2009	Alejandro Toledo	As ambassador; concurrent with Jordan and Iran.
Alberto Gustavo Gálvez de Rivero		June 1, 2009	2014	Alan García	As ambassador; concurrent in Jordan and Syria.
Hugo César Portugal Carbajal		2014	2017	Ollanta Humala	As ambassador; concurrent with Jordan and Lebanon.
Paúl Andrés Paredes Portella		2018	2021	Pedro Pablo Kuczynski	As ambassador; concurrent with Jordan and Lebanon.
José Jesús Guillermo Betancourt Rivera		September 14, 2022	December 7, 2022	Pedro Castillo	As ambassador.

== See also ==
- List of ambassadors of Egypt to Peru
- List of ambassadors of Peru to Algeria
- List of ambassadors of Peru to Kenya
- List of ambassadors of Peru to Morocco
- List of ambassadors of Peru to South Africa
