= List of ambassadors of Peru to Algeria =

Ambassador of Peru to the People's Democratic Republic of Algeria
- Great Seal of Peru
- Ministry of Foreign Affairs
- Appointer: The president of Peru
- Inaugural holder: Enrique de los Heros Riquelme
- Formation: 1972
- Website: Embassy of Peru in Algeria

The extraordinary and plenipotentiary ambassador of Peru to the People's Democratic Republic of Algeria is the official representative of the Republic of Peru to the People's Democratic Republic of Algeria.

The ambassador in Algiers is accredited to Tunisia and, until 2010, Libya. (Note: Peru severed its diplomatic relations with Libya in 2010 and has not restored them since.)

Peru and Algeria established diplomatic relations in 1972. (Note: Before the establishment of diplomatic relations, Peru had maintained a consulate in French Algeria since at least 1874. M. Mélia is named as a consul in Algeria from 1908 to 1911.) Peru maintains an embassy in Algiers since the establishment of relations, which was once closed in 1990 until it reopened in 2005.

== List of representatives ==
| Name | Portrait | Term begin | Term end | President | Notes |
|---|---|---|---|---|---|
| Enrique de los Heros Riquelme | | June 30, 1972 | 1975? | Juan Velasco Alvarado | First ambassador of Peru to Algeria. |
| Edgardo de Habich | | 1975 | 1976 | Juan Velasco Alvarado | As ambassador. |
| José Rafael Eduardo Beraún Araníbar | | 2005 | 2010 | Alejandro Toledo | As ambassador; accredited to Tunisia and Libya from 2006 until the rupture of relations with the latter in 2010. |
| José Martín Ramón Yrigoyen Yrigoyen | | 2010 | December 31, 2012 | Alan García | As ambassador; concurrent with Tunisia. |
| Luis Felipe Gálvez Villarroel | | 2013 | 2015 | Ollanta Humala | As ambassador. |
| Librado Augusto Orozco Zapata | | N/A | N/A | Ollanta Humala | Orozco resigned before taking office and his appointment was left without effect. |
| Gustavo Felipe José Lembcke Hoyle | | October 1, 2016 | 2022 | Pedro Pablo Kuczynski | As ambassador. |
| Jorge Eduardo Wurst Calle | | December 30, 2022 | 2026 | Dina Boluarte | As ambassador. |

== See also ==
- List of ambassadors of Algeria to Peru
- List of ambassadors of Peru to Egypt
- List of ambassadors of Peru to Kenya
- List of ambassadors of Peru to South Africa
