= Peru–South Africa relations =

Relations between Peru and South Africa

- Peru: South Africa

Diplomatic mission
- Embassy of Peru, Pretoria: None

Peru–South Africa relations are the diplomatic and bilateral relations between the Republic of Peru and the Republic of South Africa. Both countries established relations in 1974 and reestablished them in July 1993, after the end of Apartheid. They are members of the World Trade Organization and the United Nations.

== History ==
Relations were officially established in 1974, although they had existed unofficially beforehand, as seen in the appointment in 1970 of an honorary consul of South Africa in Peru.

During the 1980s, Peru played an active role in opposing the South African policy of Apartheid, participating in the World Conference on Sanctions against Racist South Africa that took place in June 1986 in Paris, organised by UNESCO.

In 1985, the Peruvian consulate general in Cape Town—that had existed since at least the 1960s —was closed by Allan Wagner Tizón in protest of Apartheid and the South African occupation of Namibia. In 1986, prior to Namibian independence and as part of the protests, the Peruvian government severed its relations with the South African government and established relations with the South West Africa People's Organisation (SWAPO), which would become the ruling party of an independent Namibia in 1989, during that year's summit of the Non-Aligned Movement. As part of this development, SWAPO President Sam Nujoma visited Lima and a SWAPO representative office was opened in July of the same year.

Other developments that year included a monetary contribution to the Africa Fund, the naming of ambassadors to Kenya and Zimbabwe, an assessment mission to Zambia and in October of the same year, Peru hosted a meeting of cooperation with Sub-Saharan countries in Lima, where four countries (Kenya, Ghana, Nigeria and Equatorial Guinea) joined the Frontline States.

In 1988, the "Seminar on the Role of the Latin American and Caribbean Media in the International Campaign against Apartheid" was held in Lima with the cooperation of the Peruvian government and was chaired by Acting Foreign Minister and Minister of Justice Gonzalo Durant Aspíllaga. Attendees included 17 Latin American and Caribbean countries, South African journalists and SWAPO representatives.

After the end of the racial policy and the independence of Namibia, Peru opened an embassy in Pretoria on January 11, 1994. This followed the reestablishment of relations on July 28, 1993.

In 2010, a statue of Nelson Mandela was inaugurated in San Isidro, a district of Lima. The inauguration ceremony featured then South African ambassador Leslie Manley.

South Africa's embassy in Lima, which had first opened in January 1998, closed in 2021.

== Trade ==
South Africa is the main destination of Peruvian exports to Africa. Peru opened a commercial office in Pretoria in 2013.

In 2019, trade between Peru and South Africa decreased by 33.9%, reaching US$77 million, having increased by US$6 million the previous year. In the five years prior, Peruvian exports to South Africa decreased at an average annual rate of 15.4% and in 2019 totaled US$42 million.

== Resident diplomatic missions ==
- Peru has an embassy in Pretoria.
- South Africa had an embassy in Lima until 2021.

== See also ==
- Foreign relations of Peru
- Foreign relations of South Africa
- List of ambassadors of Peru to South Africa
- List of ambassadors of South Africa to Peru
