= Embassy of Egypt, Lima =

Diplomatic mission of Egypt to Peru

Embassy of the Arab Republic of Egypt in Lima
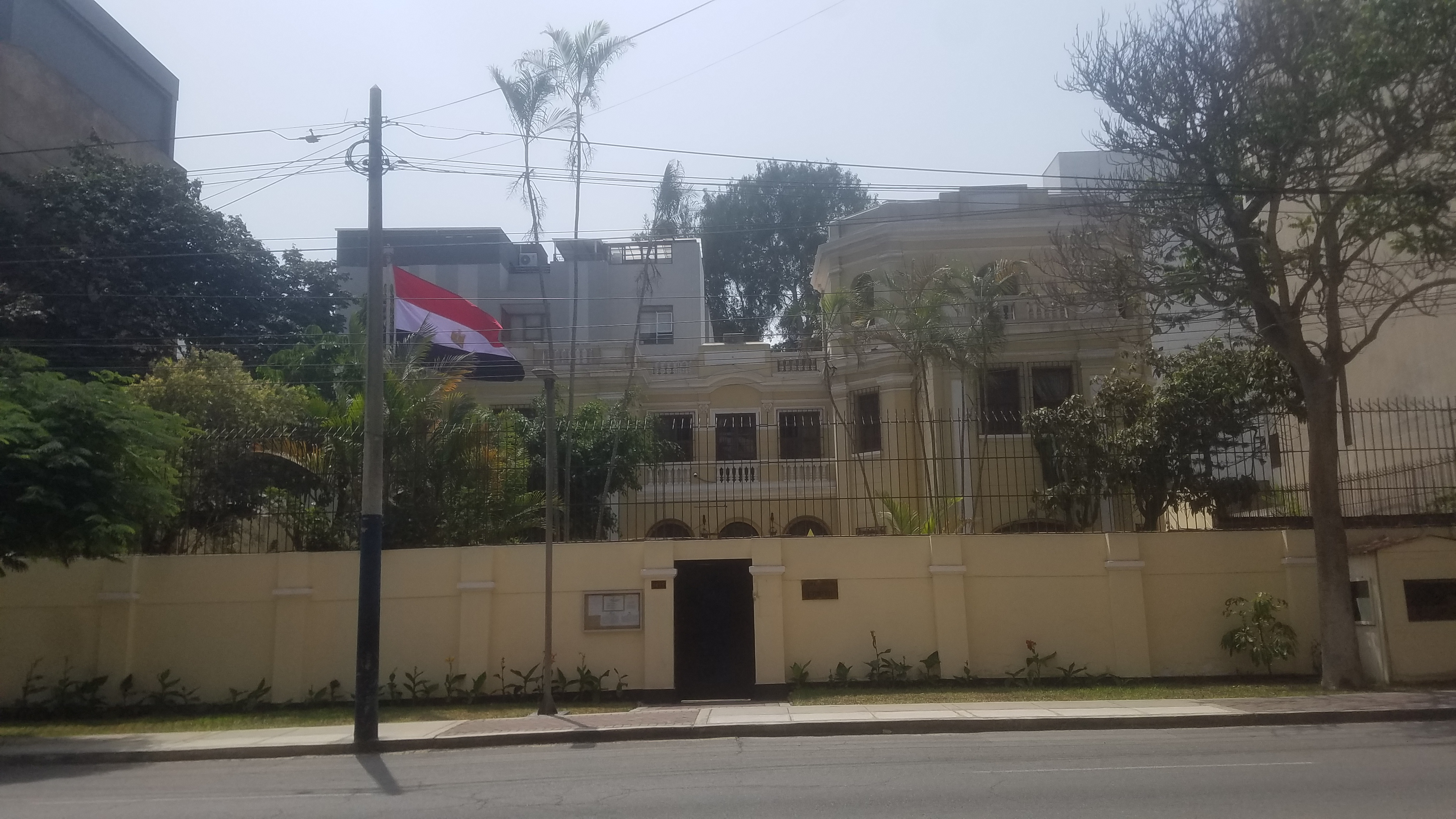
- Location: Orrantia del Mar, San Isidro
- Address: Jorge Basadre Grohmann 1470
- Opened: 1963
- Ambassador: Ahmed Hamdi Bakr

The Embassy of Egypt in Lima (Russian: Embajada de Egipto en Lima; Arabic: سفارة جمهورية مصر العربية في ليما) is the diplomatic mission of the Arab Republic of Egypt to the Republic of Peru. The chancery is located at 1470 Jorge Basadre Grohmann Avenue, in the Orrantia del Mar neighbourhood of San Isidro District, Lima.

The current Egyptian ambassador to Peru is Ahmed Hamdi Bakr.

== History ==
Peru and the United Arab Republic (UAR) first established relations on October 7, 1963, with the Arab country being the first with which Peru established relations in Africa. The Egyptian embassy in Lima opened the same year relations were established, with the Peruvian mission being the oldest in the continent.

One of Egypt's ambassadors, Samy Tawfik Ismail, was one of the initial hostages of the Japanese embassy hostage crisis.

== List of representatives ==
Below is a list of representatives of the United Arab Republic and Egypt to Peru.

Ambassador		Term start	Term end	Head of state	Notes
Aly Kabil	علي قابيل	?	c. 1972	Gamal Abdel Nasser	
Mohamed El-Taher Shash	محمد الطاهر شاش	1973	?	Anwar Sadat	Named in March 1973.
Wahib Fahmy El-Miniawi	وهيب فهمي المنياوي	bef. 1979	aft. 1982	Anwar Sadat	
Samy Tawfik Ismail	سامى توفيق إسماعيل	1993	1997	Hosni Mubarak	
Hala Hassan Ismail	هاله حسن اسماعيل	1997	aft. 2000	Hosni Mubarak	
Abdel Mawgoud El Habashy	عبدال موجود إل حبشي			Hosni Mubarak	
Desouky Aly Fayed	دسوقي علي فايد	2005	2008	Hosni Mubarak	Credentials presented on September 28.
Hesham Mohamed Abbas Khalil	هشام محمد عباس خليل	2008	?	Hosni Mubarak	Credentials presented on September 16.
Ahmad Salama		2012		Mohamed Morsi	
Gamal Tawfik	جمال توفيق	2016	2020	Abdel Fattah el-Sisi	Credentials presented on October 4.
Hany Moawad Selim Labib	هاني سليم	2020		Abdel Fattah el-Sisi	
Ahmed Hamdi Bakr Mohamed		April 30, 2024	Incumbent	Abdel Fattah el-Sisi	

== See also ==
- Egypt–Peru relations
- List of ambassadors of Peru to Egypt
