= Embassy of Algeria, Lima =

Diplomatic mission of Algeria to Peru

Embassy of Algeria in Peru
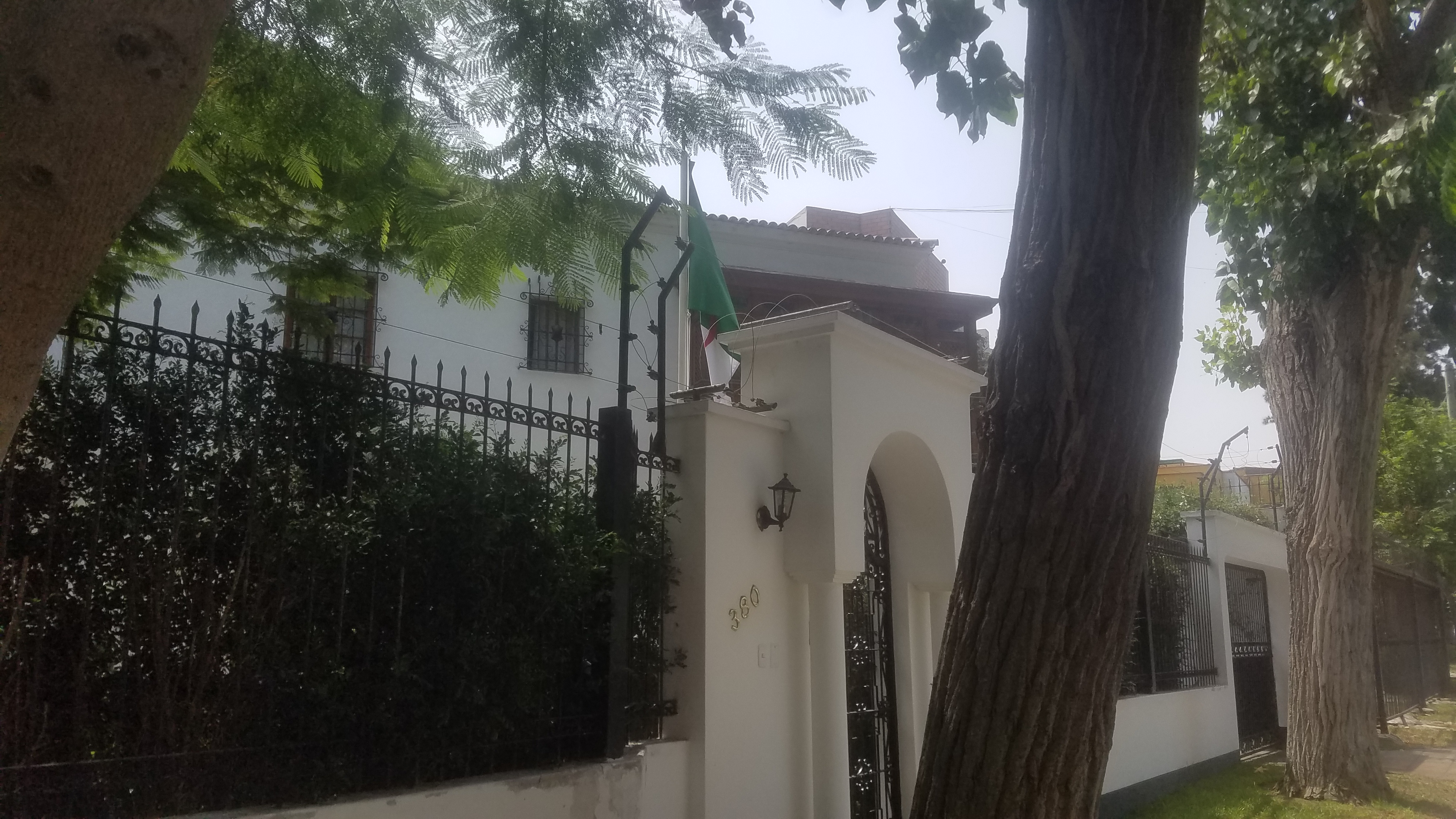
- Location: San Isidro, Lima, Peru
- Address: Avenida El Rosario 380
- Opened: 1975 (Note: Original opening. The embassy reopened in 2004.)
- Ambassador: Nawel Settouti
- Website: Official website

The Embassy of Algeria in Peru (Note: Arabic: سفارة الجزائر بليما; French: Ambassade d'Algérie à Lima; Spanish: Embajada de Argelia en Lima.) represents the represents the permanent diplomatic mission of the People's Democratic Republic of Algeria to the Republic of Peru. The chancery is located at Avenida El Rosario 380, El Rosario, San Isidro District, Lima.

The current ambassador of Algeria to Peru since 2024 is Nawel Settouti.

== History ==
Algeria and Peru established diplomatic relations on March 10, 1972, although relations with France had already existed long before Algerian independence, and an embassy in Rabat had been accredited to Algeria (and Tunisia) since 1964.

Both countries opened their embassies soon after relations were established, although both closed during the 1990s due to financial reasons. This closure lasted until 2004, when both countries agreed to reopen their respective embassies. The first resident ambassador after the embassy's reopening was Abdelkader Riame.

Prior to moving to its current location, the embassy was located at Calle Tudela y Várela 360, currently the location of the embassy of Turkey since 2010.

=== Residence ===
The ambassador's residence is also located in San Isidro District, at 121 José Dionisio Anchorena street. Its former location at the corner of Lizardo Alzamora Oeste (485-495) and Los Laureles streets has also since been occupied by the residence of the diplomatic mission of Turkey.

== List of representatives ==
Ambassador	Start time	End time	Notes	President
2004: Embassy reopened
Abdelkader Riame	January 5, 2005	2009	Ambassador Riame presented his credentials in January 2005.	Abdelaziz Bouteflika
Mohammed Bensabri	January 15, 2010	2015	Bensabri presented his credentials on January 15.	Abdelaziz Bouteflika
Chakib Rachid Kaid (Note: Arabic: شكيب رشيد قائد)	September 2015	2020		Abdelaziz Bouteflika
Mohamed Lamine Laabas	2020	2022		Abdelmadjid Tebboune
Kamel Retieb (Note: Arabic: كمال رتياب)	October 11, 2022	2024	Retieb presented his credentials on October 11.	Abdelmadjid Tebboune
Nawel Settouti (Note: Arabic: نوال السطاوطي)	July 25, 2024	2022	Settouti presented her credentials to diplomat Luis Escalante Schuler at Torre Tagle Palace on July 25, and to Dina Boluarte on October 2, 2024.	Abdelmadjid Tebboune

== See also ==
- Algeria–Peru relations
- List of ambassadors of Peru to Algeria
