= El Olivar, Peru =

Park in Lima, Peru

Coordinates: 12°06′06″S 77°02′05″W

Bosque El Olivar
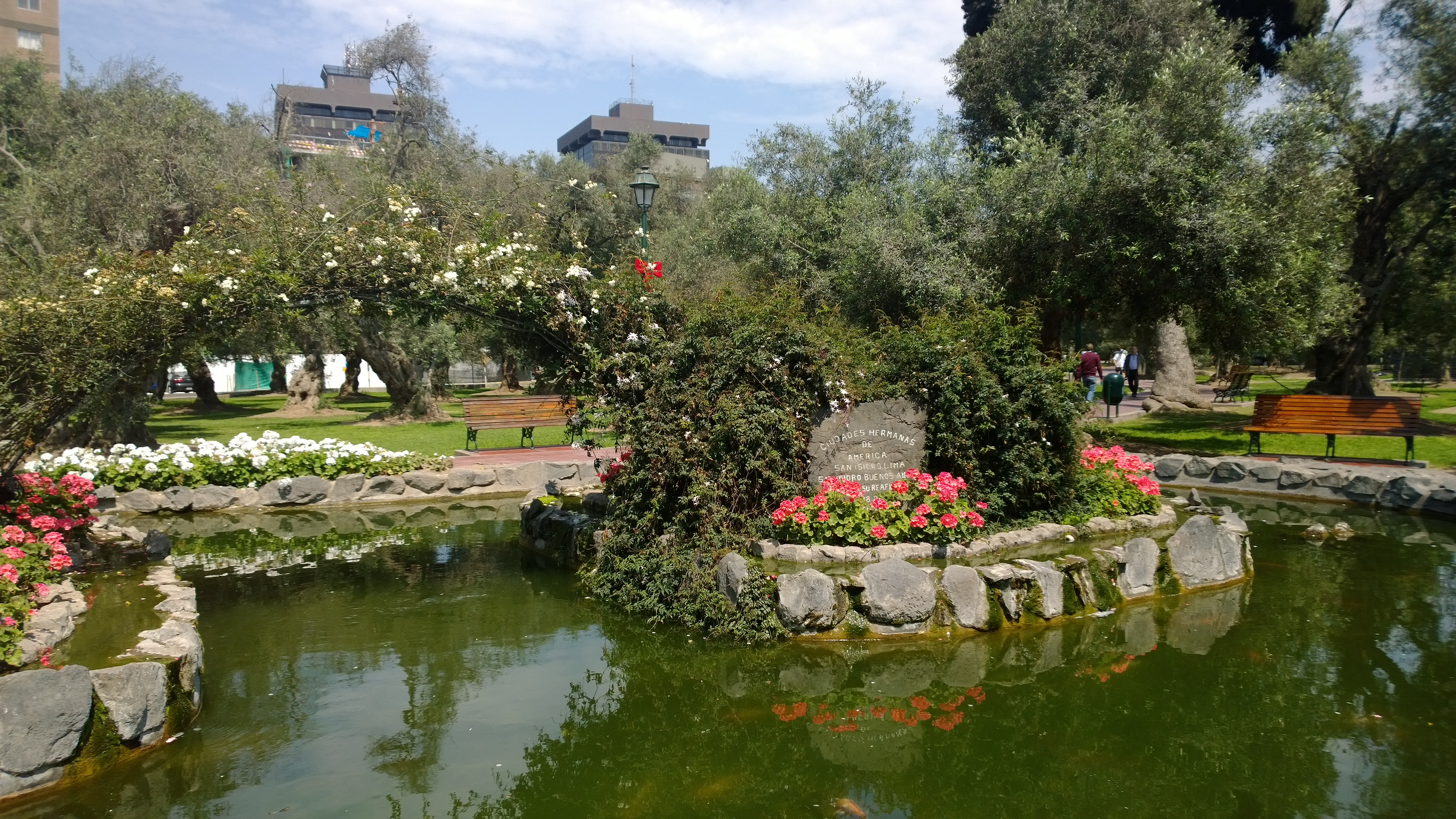
- Interactive map of Bosque El Olivar
- Type: Public park
- Location: San Isidro District, Lima
- Area: 10,36–23 ha
- Operated by: Municipality of San Isidro

Cultural Heritage of Peru
- Official name: Zona Monumental del Bosque de los Olivos
- Type: Immobable tangible
- Designated: December 2, 1998
- Legal basis: R.D.N. Nº 410/INC

Bosque el Olivar ("Olive grove woodland") is a public park located in the neighbourhood of the same name in San Isidro District, Lima, Peru. Named after the olive trees located there since their introduction in 1560, it is part of the cultural heritage of Peru.

== History ==
Originally part of the Guática territory, under the Spanish authorities it became part of the El Rosario hacienda, belonging to the Dominican Order, until 1539. Martín de Porres was one of the people who planted olive trees in the area during the 17th century. Once property of the Count of San Isidro, it was declared a National Monument in 1959 and a Monumental Zone in 1998.

The park is the location of the House of Culture (and former Municipal Palace), the El Olivar Cultural Centre, which houses the Municipal Library, the Chamber Theater, the Children's Library, the Multipurpose Room and the Art Gallery; and the Marina Núñez del Prado Museum. There are also many buildings designed by architects such as Ricardo de Jaxa Malachowski, Emilio Harth-Terré and José Álvarez Calderón.

The neighbourhood, which consists of the park's surroundings, houses a number of historical buildings, among them the embassies of Colombia (residence), Finland, France, and Morocco.

== Gallery ==
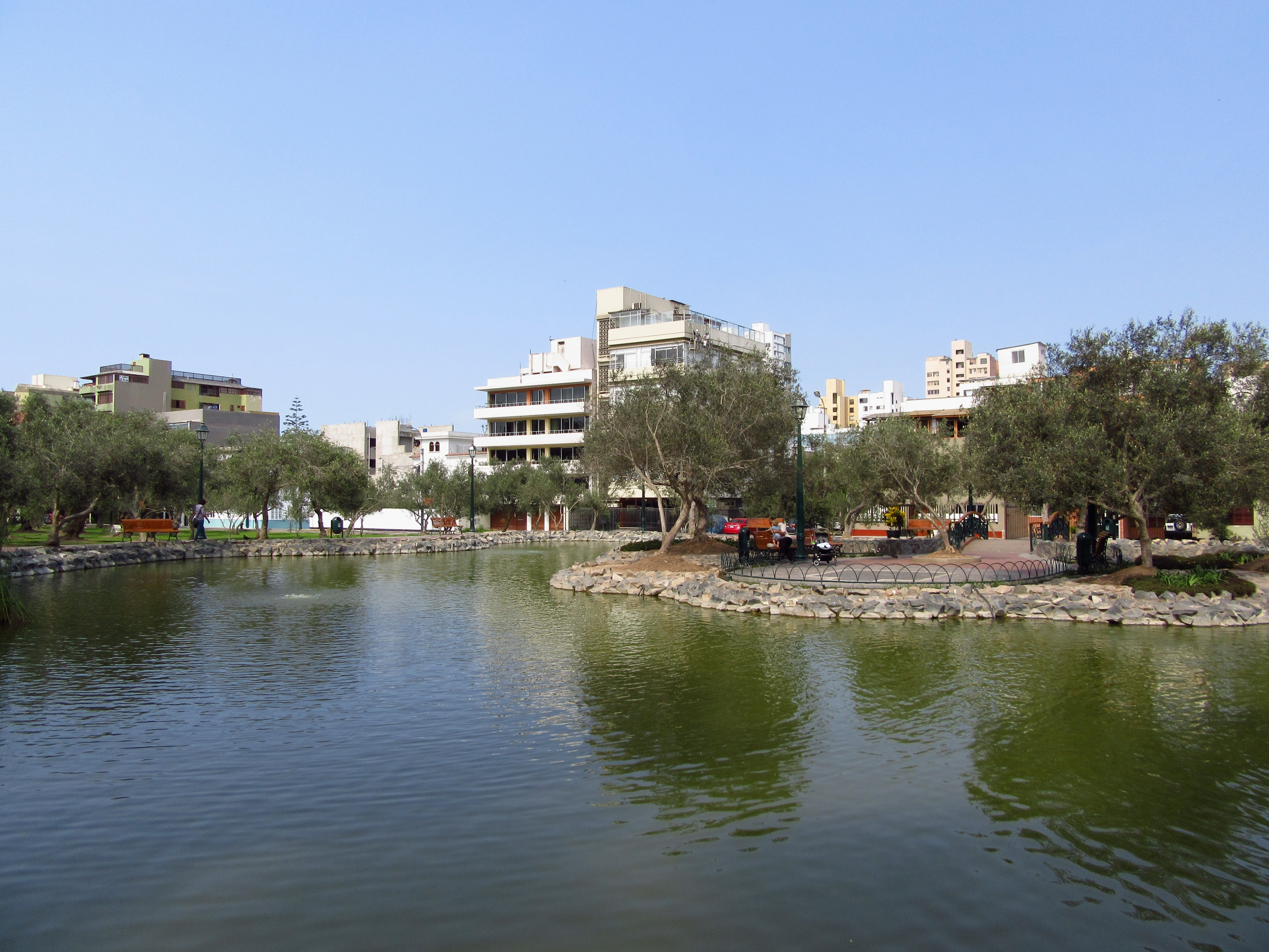
Lake

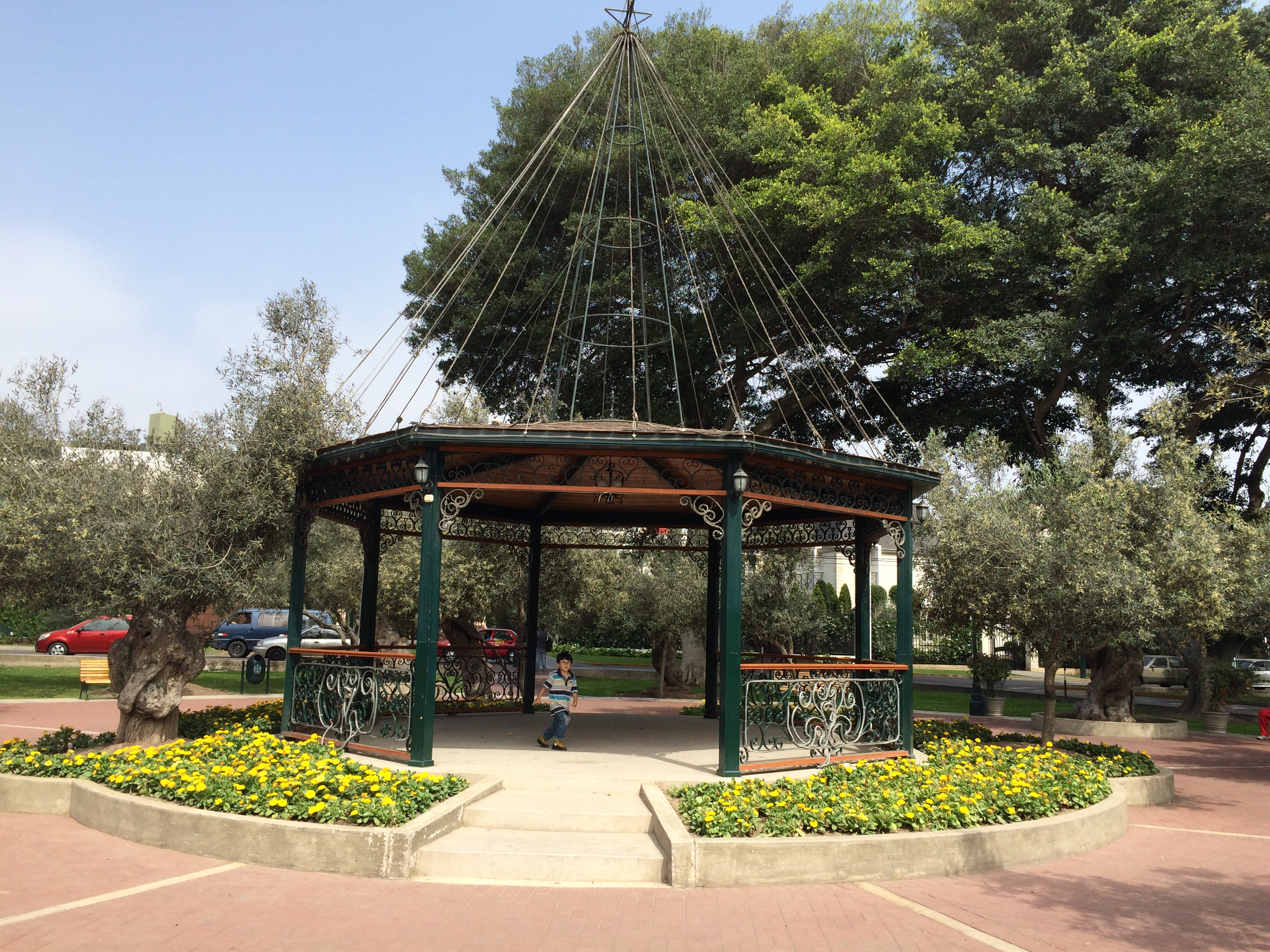
Gazebo

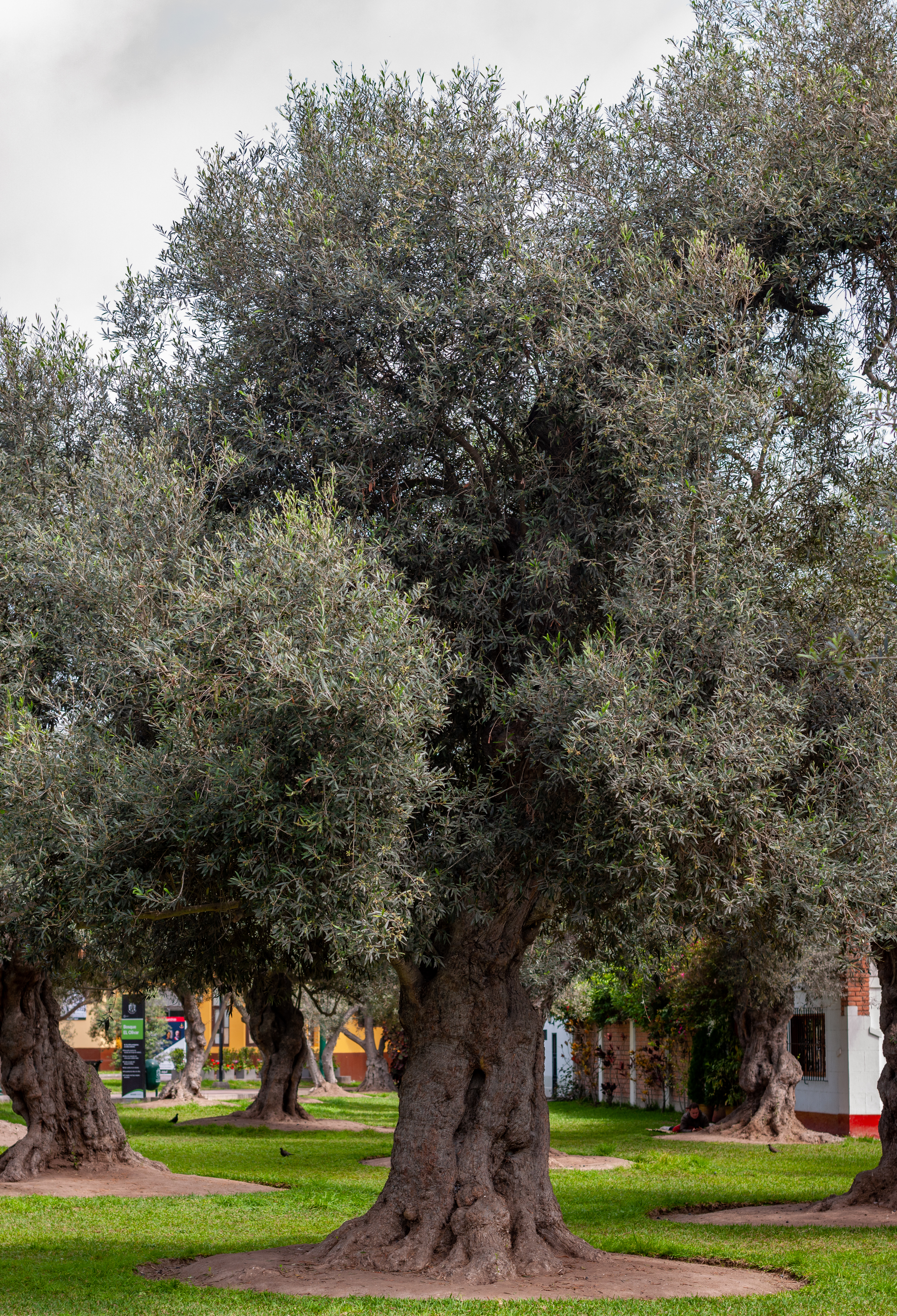
Olive tree

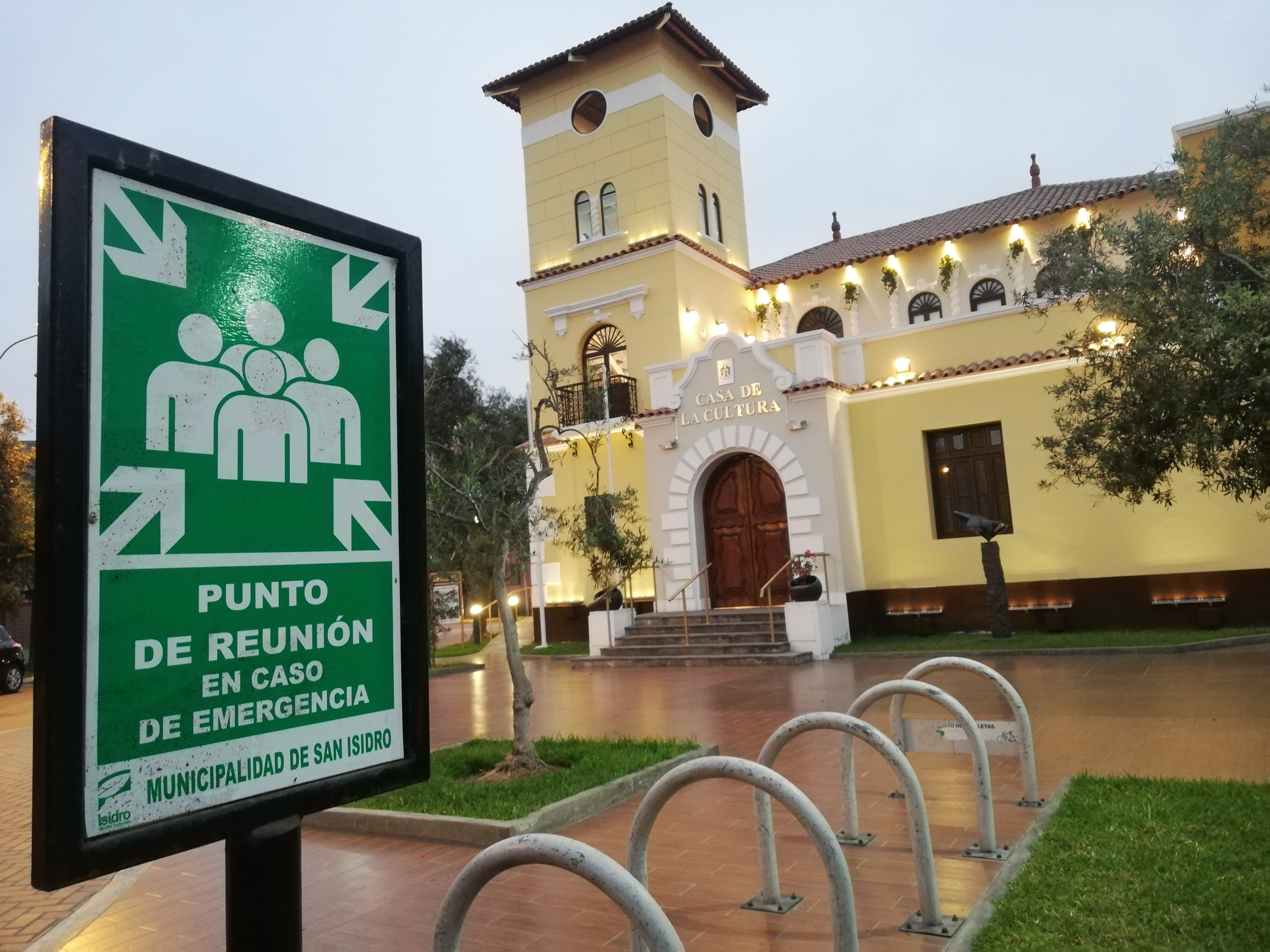
House of Culture

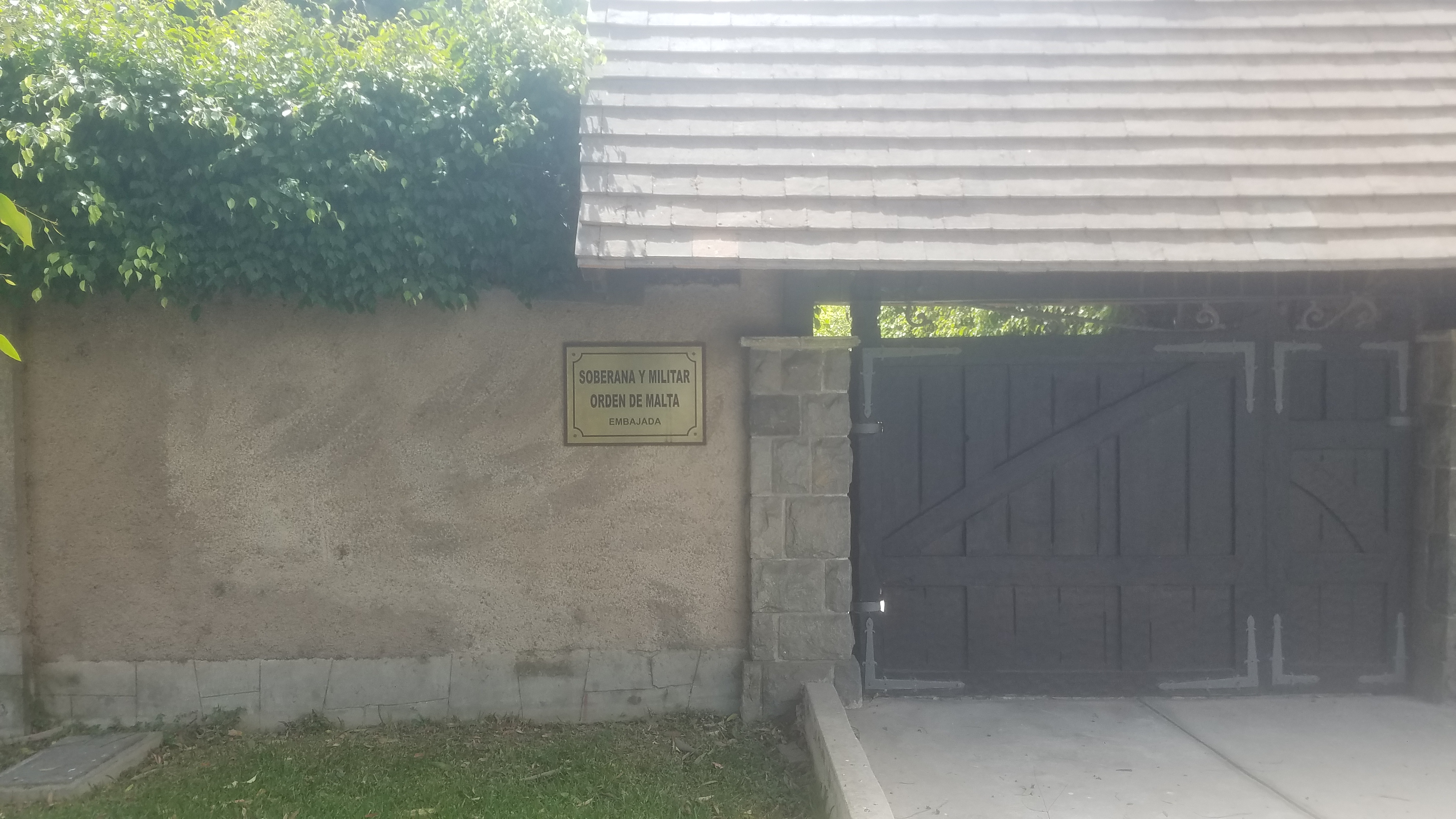
Embassy of the Sovereign Military Order of Malta

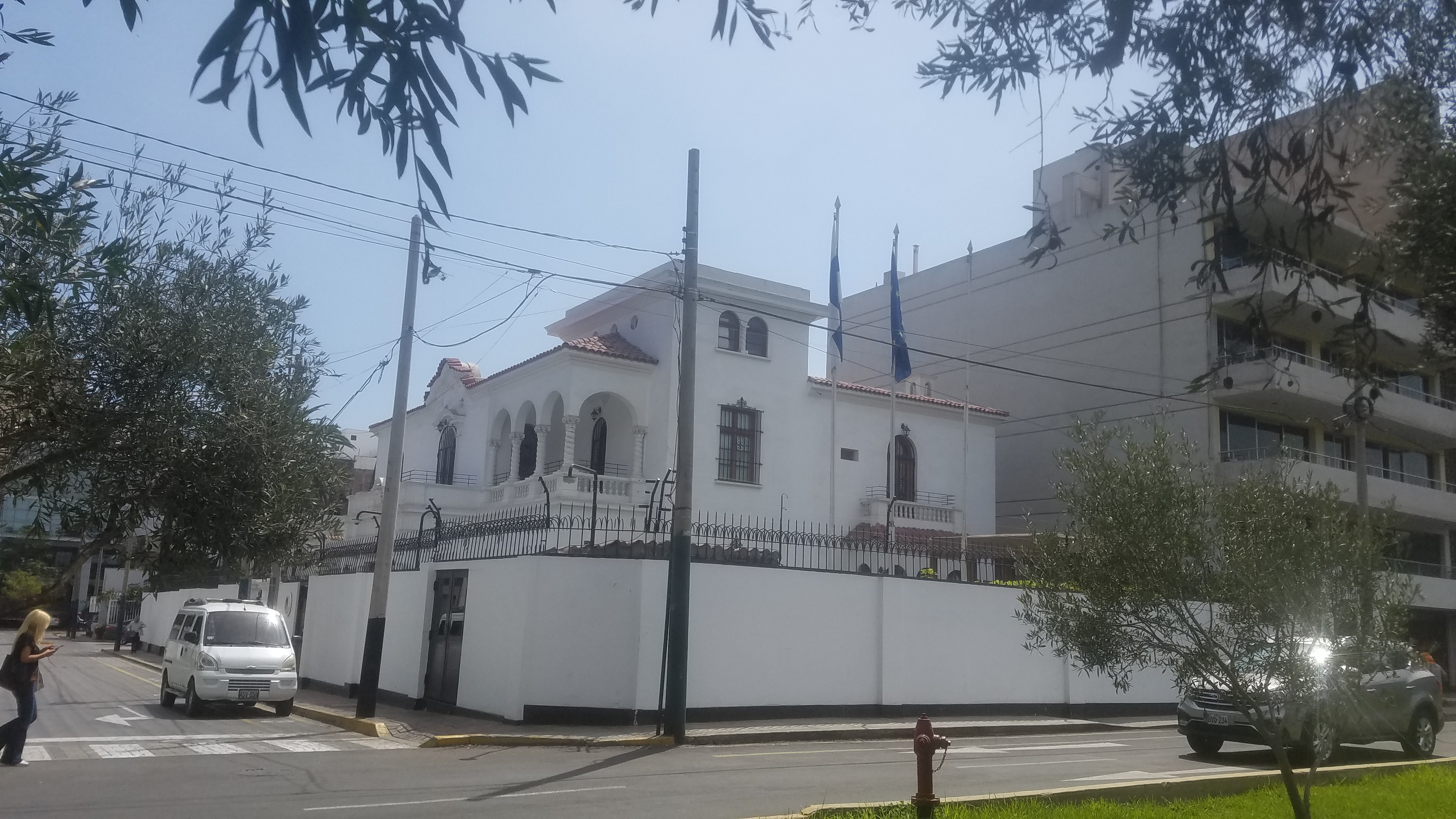
Embassy of Finland

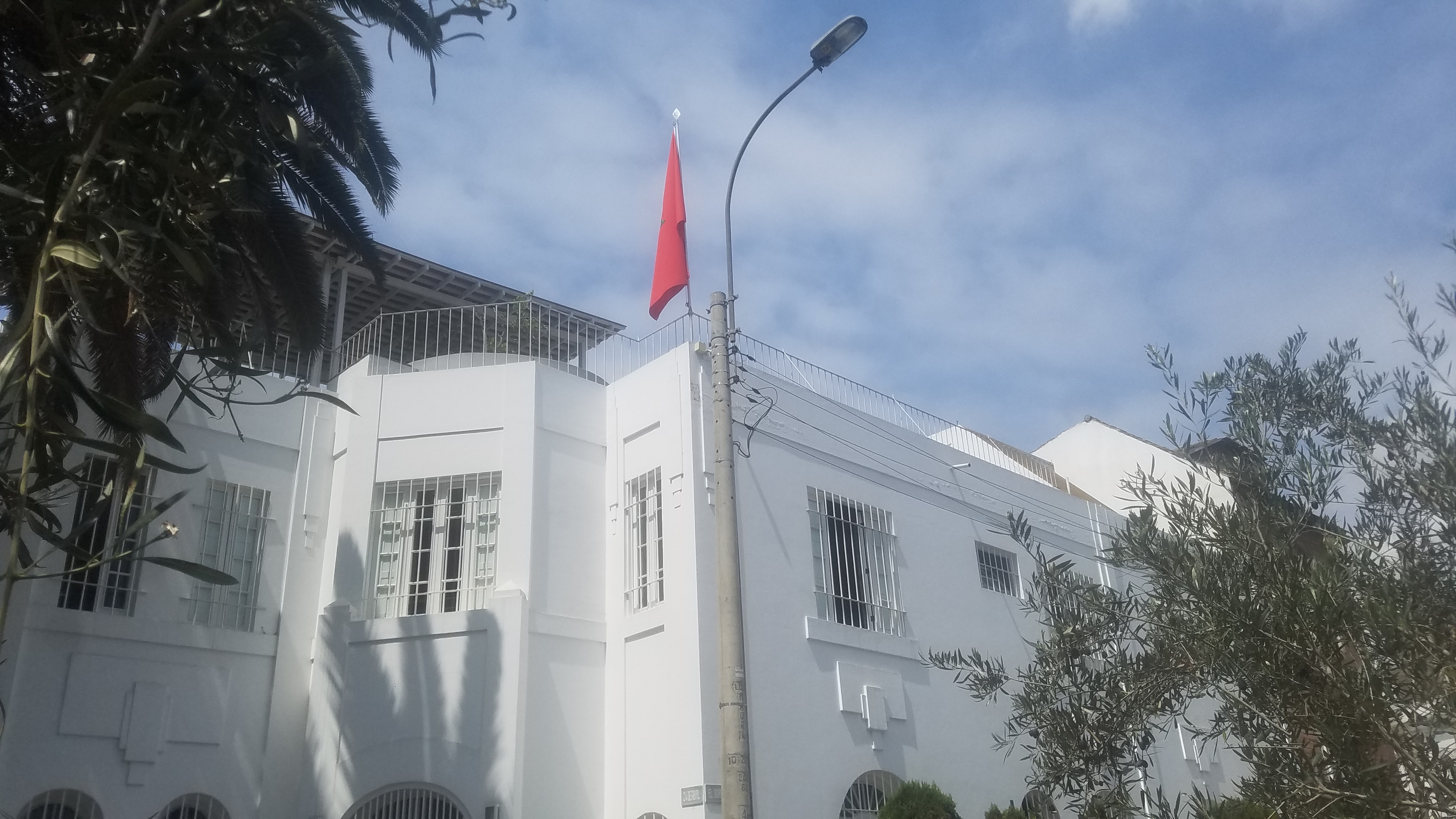
Embassy of Morocco

== See also ==
- San Isidro District, Lima
