= List of ambassadors of the Sahrawi Arab Democratic Republic to Peru =

Sahrawi Ambassador to Peru
- Sahrawi coat of arms
- Ministry of Foreign Affairs
- Style: His Excellency
- Appointer: The president
- Inaugural holder: Hamri Bouiha
- Formation: 1987
- Final holder: Hamdi Bueha
- Abolished: September 23, 2023

The ambassador of the Sahrawi Arab Democratic Republic to Peru was the official representative of the Sahrawi Arab Democratic Republic (SADR) to Peru. The Sahrawi Arab Democratic Republic's embassy in Peru was located in Miraflores, a district of Lima. Prior to its opening, the embassy in Caracas was accredited instead.

== Background ==
The Sahrawi Arab Democratic Republic was first recognised by Peru through a treaty signed on August 16, 1984, under the presidency of Fernando Belaúnde. Bilateral relations were then formally established in 1987 but ultimately frozen in 1996 due to the Moroccan government pursuing closer relations with Peru as a direct consequence of the recognition, as well as criticisms at home and diplomatic incidents involving both African states.

After relations were suspended, the only Peruvian government to take an interest in the situation in Western Sahara was that of Ollanta Humala, who sent a delegation to the territories administered by the Polisario Front and the Algerian refugee camps, where they met with Sahrawi authorities. During this period, the Sahrawi government was represented through special envoys sent to negotiate the reestablishment of relations.

After 25 years, relations were resumed on September 8, 2021, under the presidency of Pedro Castillo. After a year, the Ministry of Foreign Affairs of Peru announced that it decided to withdraw its recognition of the state on August 18, 2022, but this was disputed by Castillo, who confirmed the recognition of the state on September 8, 2022. Castillo subsequently met with Foreign Affairs Minister Mohamed Salem Uld Salek and speculated on the prospect of opening an embassy in Peru. The embassy ultimately opened in November 2022 and closed on September 23, 2023.

== List of representatives ==
Ambassadors from the Sahrawi Arab Democratic Republic to Peru
Name	Term begin	Term end	President	Notes
Hamri Bouiha	May 1987	1988	Mohamed Abdelaziz	First special envoy and ambassador of the SADR to Peru. Resident in Caracas.
Hambi B. Sidi Mahmud	1988	September 9, 1996	Mohamed Abdelaziz	Second ambassador of the SADR to Peru until relations were frozen. Also resident in Caracas and also accredited to Bolivia and Ecuador. He presented his credentials on April 28, 1988.
Alisalem Sirizeyn (Note: Arabic: اعلي سالم سيدي الزين.)	2010	2015	Mohamed Abdelaziz	As special envoy. He became the first resident ambassador to Ecuador in 2015, presenting his credentials on September 28.
Khadijetou El Mokhtar (Note: Arabic: خديجتو المختار.)	May 2017	September 2017	Brahim Ghali	As special envoy. She was detained at Jorge Chávez International Airport for seventeen days due to her misuse of her tourist visa, as she was travelling with a Spanish passport due to Peruvian authorities not recognising her credentials.
Hamdi Bueha Chejmohamed (Note: Arabic: حمدي أبيها محمد الشيخ.)	2022	September 23, 2023	Brahim Ghali	As resident ambassador. His term ended with the embassy's closure on September 23, 2023.

== See also ==
- Foreign relations of Peru
- Foreign relations of the Sahrawi Arab Democratic Republic
- List of ambassadors of Morocco to Peru
