= Khadijetou El Mokhtar =

Sahrawi politician and diplomat

- خديجتو المختار
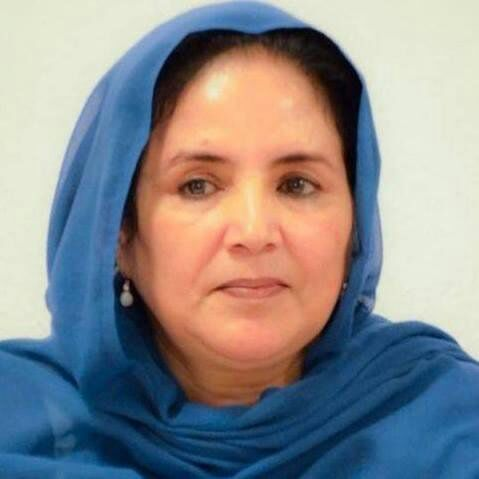

Sahrawi ambassador to Peru Not officially recognised
- In office May 2017 – September 2017
- President: Brahim Ghali
- Prime Minister: Abdelkader Taleb Omar
- Preceded by: Alisalem Sirizeyn
- Succeeded by: Hamdi Bueha

Personal details
- Born: 4 February 1959 Villa Cisneros, Sahara, Spain
- Party: Polisario
- Education: University of Alcalá
- Occupation: Diplomat

Khadijetou El Mokhtar (Arabic: خديجتو المختار, Spanish: Jadiyetu El Mohtar; born 4 February 1959) is a Sahrawi politician who acted as the country's special representative to Peru in 2017, being detained for seventeen days at Jorge Chávez International Airport due to the country's lack of recognition of the Sahrawi Arab Democratic Republic (SADR) at the time. Since 1986, she has been a member of the National Union of Sahrawi Women and of the delegation of the Polisario Front in Spain.

== Biography ==
El Mokhtar was born on February 4, 1959, in Villa Cisneros, Spanish Sahara. She taught from 1978 to 1985 at the Sidi Brahim Basiri school in Aousserd (not to be confused with the town of the same name), a wilayah of the Saharawi refugee camps in Tindouf, promoting the dissemination of the Spanish language.

El Mokhtar was appointed special representative to Peru by Brahim Ghali to begin negotiations to restore diplomatic relations on 15 May 2017. Peru had originally recognised the SADR as a state in 1984 but rescinded that recognition and froze diplomatic ties in 1996. At the time, she was President of the National Union of Sahrawi Women.

Described as the SADR's "roving ambassador to Latin America", she was involved in political meetings between 10 June and 18 July but on re-entering Peru on 9 September was refused entry and detained at Jorge Chávez International Airport. She had been added to a list of people banned from entering Peru, as her political meetings had breached the terms of her tourist visa (El Mokhtar had entered Peru on a Spanish passport and a tourist visa as her SADR documentation was not recognised by the country).

She remained at the airport, unable to enter the country and unwilling to leave despite calls for her release. El Mokhtar refused to leave willingly for the SADR (it was also claimed that she travelled at the invitation of the Peruvian senate) and was, on 28 September, placed on a flight to Spain against her will.

== See also ==
- Peru–Sahrawi Arab Democratic Republic relations
