= Peru–Sahrawi Arab Democratic Republic relations =

- Peru: Sahrawi Arab Democratic Republic

Peru–Sahrawi Arab Democratic Republic relations refers to the current and historical relations between the Republic of Peru and the Sahrawi Arab Democratic Republic (SADR).

Peru first established relations with the SADR in 1987 and froze them in 1996. After 25 years, relations were reestablished in 2021, suspended in August 2022 and again reestablished on September of the same year. In September 2023, it was announced that relations between both states were again suspended.

In 1999, and from 2012 to the present day, Peru has also sent troops to the United Nations Mission for the Referendum in Western Sahara.

== History ==
Peru first recognized the SADR through a treaty signed on August 16, 1984, under the presidency of Fernando Belaúnde. Relations were then officially established on May 5, 1987, under the first presidency of Alan García, with another treaty being signed by Peruvian Foreign Minister Allan Wagner Tizón and Sahrawi Special Envoy Hamri Bouiha, who became the first concurrent ambassador to Peru, presenting his credentials to García. Then Sahrawi foreign minister Omar Mansour paid a visit to the country from April 14 to 18 of the same year.

Despite the recognition, relations between Morocco and Peru were not negatively affected, as relations were not severed and the Peruvian embassy in Madrid continued to be accredited to the North African country. Instead, the Peruvian embassy in Rabat, which had been de facto closed since 1973 due to a lack of a chargé d'affaires, reopened in 1986, with both countries strengthening their relations.

The next ambassador accredited to Peru, Hambi B. Sidi Mahmud, presented his credentials to García on April 28, 1988, during a visit coordinated by Alfonso Barrantes. The visit was criticised by members of the press who believed that the strengthening of both governments' relations harmed the much more convenient relationship with Morocco, which controls most of the territory claimed by the SADR.

On September 9, 1996, then foreign minister Francisco Tudela announced the freezing of relations between Peru and the SADR, with Peru becoming the first Latin American country to sever relations with the state. This was due to Morocco's diplomatic efforts in Peru and then Alberto Fujimori's pro-Moroccan policy. A diplomatic incident also played a role in the decision, as the Moroccan delegation protested the presence of the Sahrawi delegation in the investiture of Fujimori after his victory in the 1995 election.

After relations were suspended, the only government to take an interest in the situation in Western Sahara was the government of Ollanta Humala, who sent a delegation headed by diplomat José Beraun Aranibar to the territories administered by the Polisario Front and Smara refugee camp in Tindouf, Algeria. The delegation met with Sahrawi authorities, including then president Mohamed Abdelaziz.

A diplomatic incident between the governments of Peru and the SADR took place in September 2017 when Sahrawi diplomat Khadijetou El Mokhtar was denied entry into Peru, remaining at Jorge Chávez International Airport for seventeen days. A communiqué released by the Peruvian Ministry of Foreign Affairs claimed that El Mohtar, despite travelling as a tourist with a Spanish passport, had acted as a diplomat in Peruvian territory—despite not having the recognition to exercise such functions—in her last visit to the country. A social media campaign, #TodosSomosJadiyetu, was started by Munbadat, a pro-human rights NGO, which was spread by the Sahrawi diaspora as well as sympathizers. The NGO also wrote a letter to the Peruvian consulate in Bilbao protesting the situation.

After 25 years, relations were resumed on September 8, 2021, under the presidency of Pedro Castillo. After a year, the Ministry of Foreign Affairs of Peru announced that it decided to withdraw its recognition of the state on August 18, 2022, but this was disputed by Castillo, who confirmed the recognition of the state on September 8, 2022. Castillo subsequently met with Foreign Affairs Minister Mohamed Salem Uld Salek and speculated on the prospect of opening an embassy in Peru.

In September 2023, it was announced that relations between both states were again suspended.

== High-level visits ==
High-level visits of Peru to the SADR (includes refugee camps in Algeria)

- Foreign Vice Minister José Beraún Aranibar (2011)

High-level visits of the SADR to Peru

- Foreign Minister Omar Mansour (1987)
- Minister Ahmed Hutch (2011 & 2013)
- Ambassador Ahmed Mulay Ali Hamadi (2016)
- Foreign Minister Mohamed Salem Uld Salek (2022)

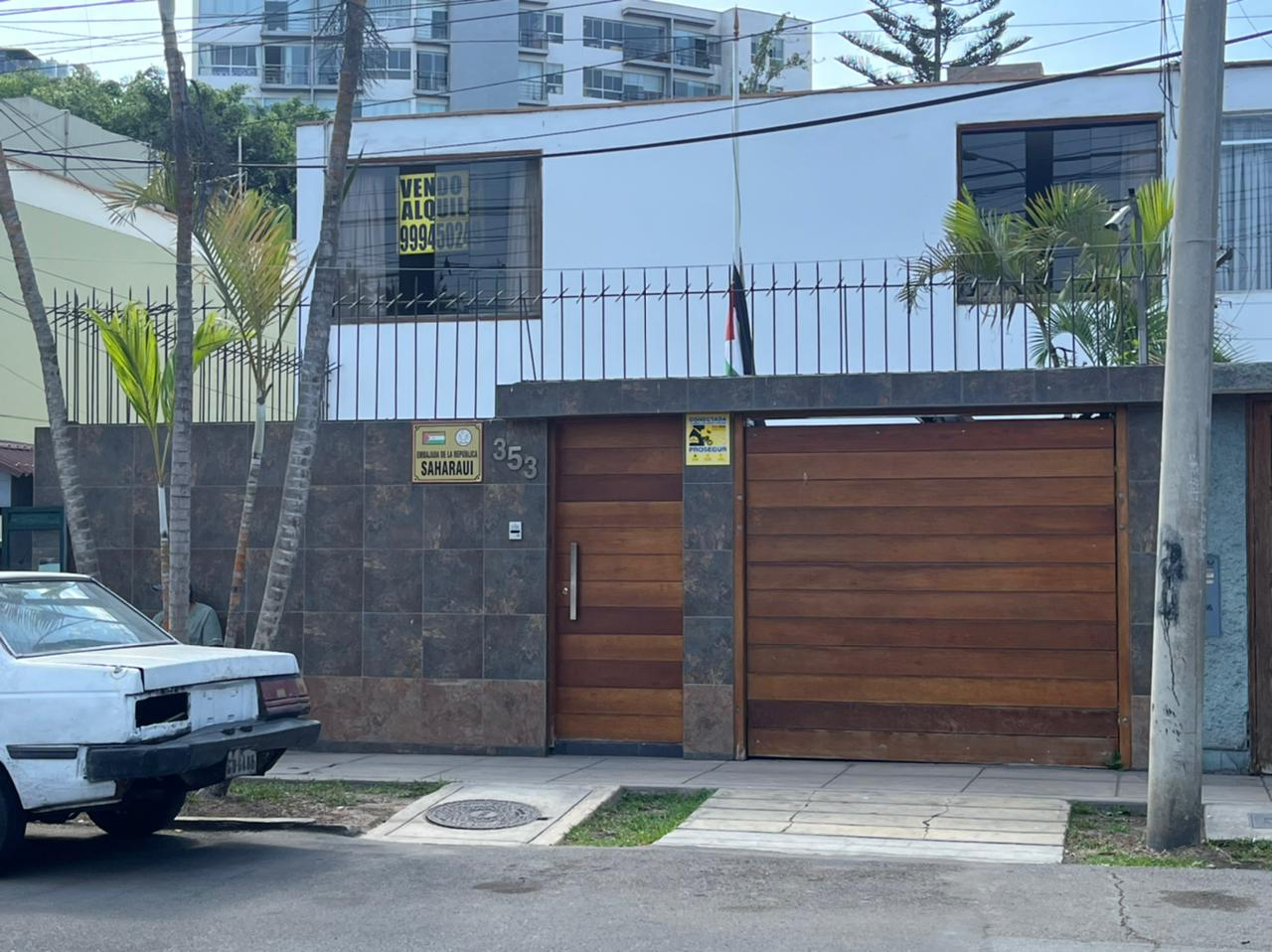
Former Sahrawi embassy in Lima

== Diplomatic missions ==
Formerly accredited from Caracas, the SADR had an embassy in Lima from November 2022 to September 2023. On the other hand, Peru did not have an embassy accredited to the SADR at any point in time.

== See also ==
- Foreign relations of Peru
- Foreign relations of the Sahrawi Arab Democratic Republic
- List of ambassadors of the Sahrawi Arab Democratic Republic to Peru
- International recognition of the Sahrawi Arab Democratic Republic

== Bibliography ==
- Avilés Flores, Fiorella Kristell (2019-11-04). EL RECONOCIMIENTO DEL PERÚ A LA RASD Y LA POSICIÓN DEL PERÚ SOBRE EL CONFLICTO EN EL SAHARA OCCIDENTAL 35 AÑOS DESPUÉS (PDF) (Thesis) (in Spanish). Academia Diplomática Javier Pérez de Cuellar. Archived from the original on 2021-09-22.
