= List of ambassadors of Peru to Kenya =

Ambassador of Peru to the Republic of Kenya
- Great Seal of Peru
- Ministry of Foreign Affairs
- Style: His Excellency
- Appointer: President of Peru
- Inaugural holder: Jesús F. Isasi Cayo
- Formation: 1987

The extraordinary and plenipotentiary ambassador of Peru to the Republic of Kenya is the official representative of the Republic of Peru to the Republic of Kenya.

Peru and Kenya established relations in 1976, and Peru opened an embassy in Nairobi on October 30, 1987. Shortly after Alberto Fujimori was elected president in 1990, the embassy was closed on the same year. Up until 2023, the embassy of Peru in South Africa, which opened in 1994, was accredited to neighbouring countries and also represented Peru in "Sub-Saharan Africa."

After considerations, the reopening of the embassy was announced in September 2023.

== List of representatives ==
Name	Title	Term begin	Term end	President	Notes
Raúl Salazar Cosio	CdA	1987	1987	Alan García	Sent to Nairobi to prepare the arrival of the ambassador the same year.
Jesús Fortunato Isasi Cayo	AEP	1987	1990	Alan García	First and final ambassador before the closure of the embassy in 1990. Previously served as the ambassador to Zimbabwe.
Johan Ríos Rivas	CdA	2023	2026	Dina Boluarte	First to hold office after the embassy's reopening.
