= Embassy of Cuba, Lima =

Diplomatic mission of Cuba to Peru

Embassy of Cuba in Peru
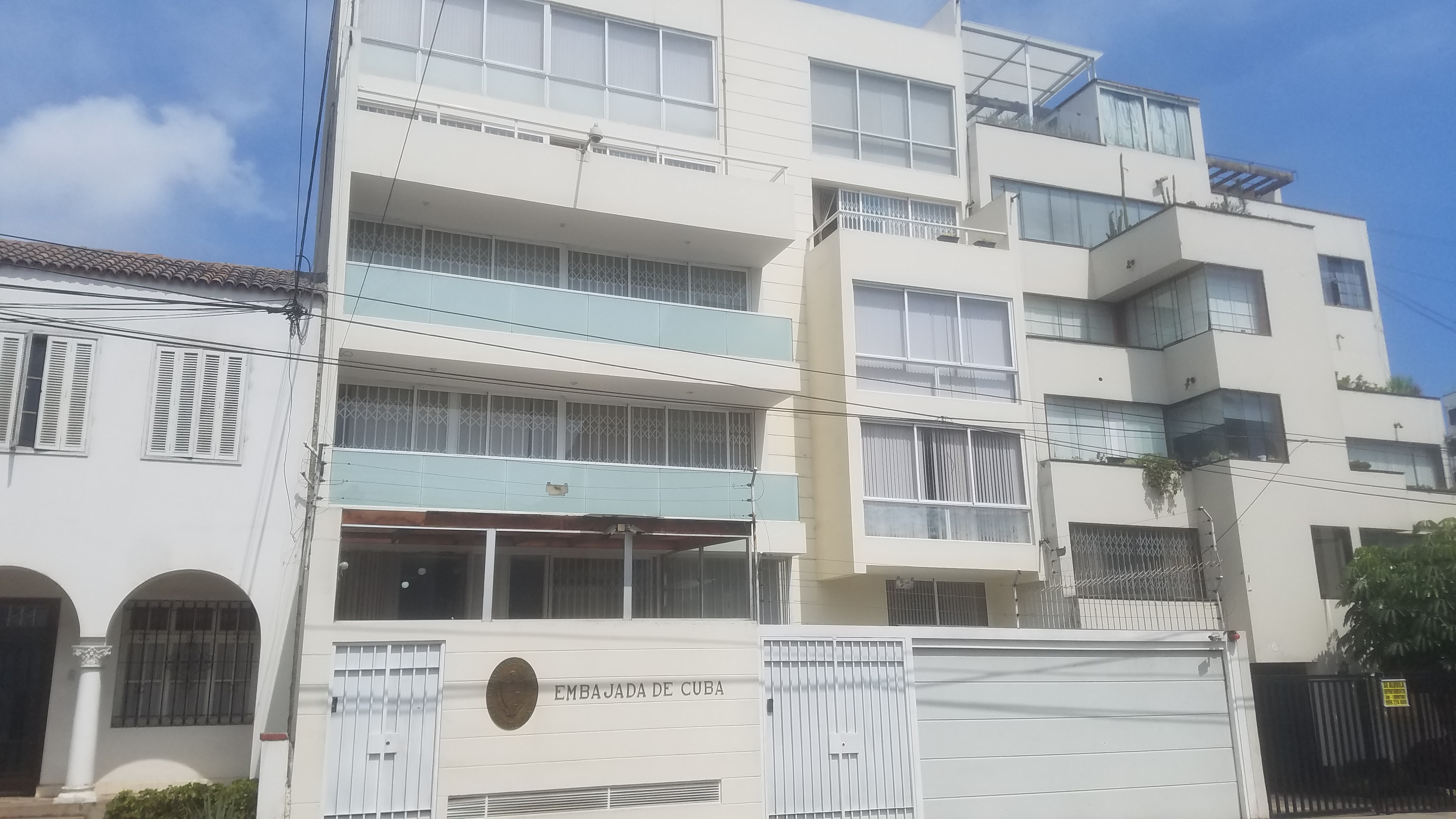
- Location: El Olivar, Lima, Peru
- Address: Calle Choquehuanca 135
- Opened: 1972
- Ambassador: Argelio Labrada Cruz (a.i.)
- Website: Official website

The Embassy of Cuba in Peru represents the represents the permanent diplomatic mission of the Republic of Cuba to the Republic of Peru. The chancery is located at Calle Choquehuanca 135, El Olivar, San Isidro District, Lima.

The current ambassador of Cuba to Peru since 2025 is Argelio Labrada Cruz, Chargé d'affaires (a.i.).

== History ==
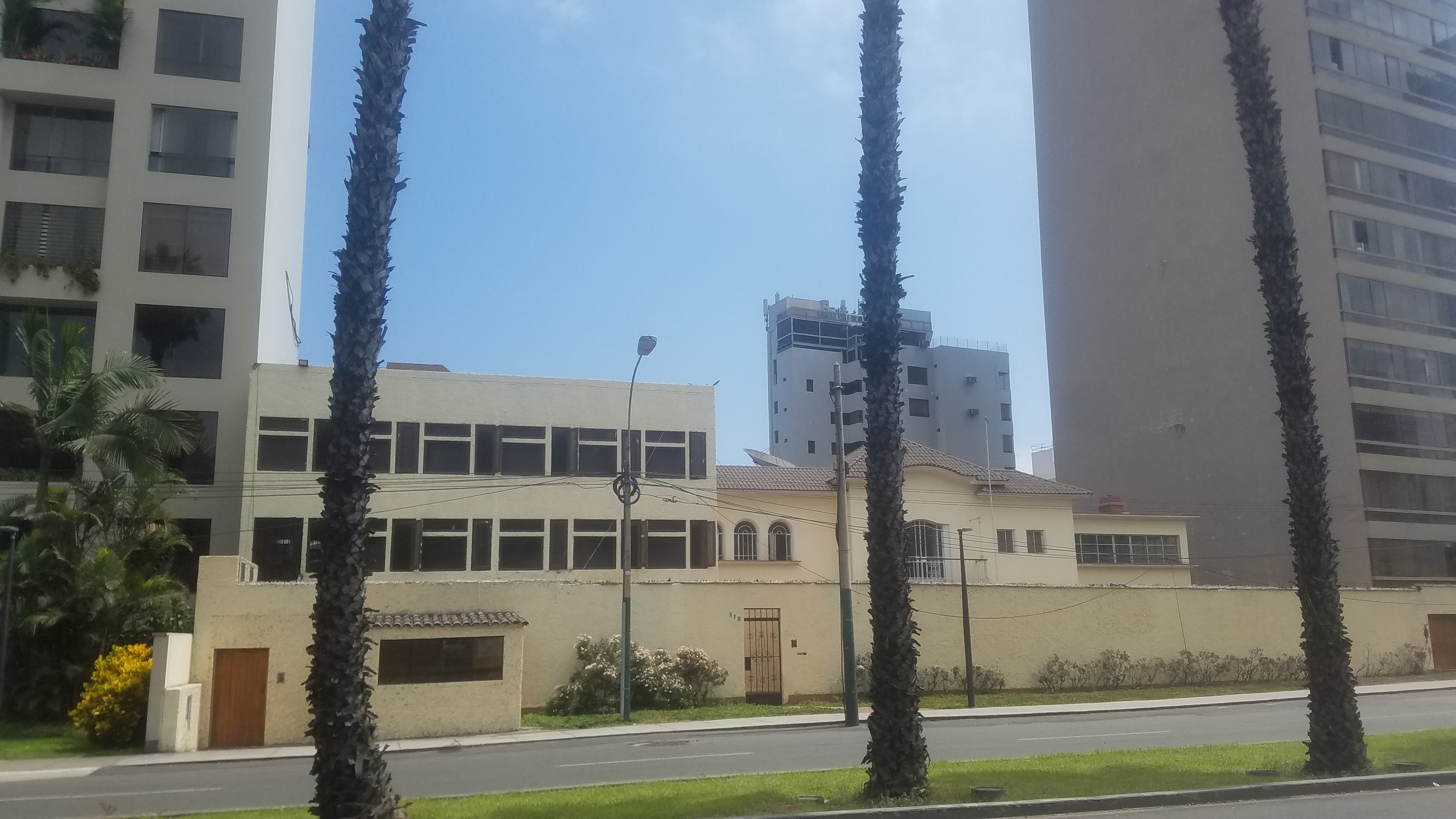
The former embassy in San Isidro.

Peru and Cuba formally established relations in 1902. Peru had previously recognised and assisted Cuban independence through an official government decree issued on August 13, 1869, during the Ten Years' War, and with ambassador to the U.S. Manuel de Freyre y Santander successfully embargoing 30 gunboats that Spain had built to blockade the island, constantly maintaining a posture in favour of the country's separation from the Spanish Empire prior to its formal independence in 1902.

Relations continued following the success of the Cuban Revolution, but their troubled nature eventually led to Peru to sever diplomatic relations between both countries on December 30, 1960, after a latter was reportedly found, which stated that the embassy was financing the Peruvian Communist Party to form assault units, recalling its ambassador in Havana and notifying the Cuban chargé d'affaires to leave the country immediately.

After the establishment of Juan Velasco Alvarado's Revolutionary Government, Peru reestablished its relations with Cuba on 8 July 1972, which have remained since, through two concurrent ceremonies celebrated in Havana and Lima that saw the appointment of new ambassadors to Cuba (Joaquín Heredia Cabieses) and to Peru (Antonio Núñez Jiménez). Prior to its move during the late 2010s, the Cuban chancery in Lima was located at 110 Coronel Pedro Portillo Avenue.

After the death of Fidel Castro in 2016, a large amount of flower arrangements were left at the former chancery. Five years later, during the 2021 Cuban protests, the embassy—now at its current location—was vandalized by unknown individuals who threw red paint at the building before quickly driving away.

=== Residence ===
The ambassador's residence is located at Pasaje El Aromito 170, within El Olivar Monumental Zone, the protected area of the neighbourhood, thus forming part of the Cultural heritage of Peru.

== List of representatives ==
The Cuban ambassador to Peru is the highest diplomatic representative of the Republic of Cuba to the Republic of Peru.

Name	Title	Term begin	Term end	Head of state	Notes
Ambrosio Valiente y Duany	M	1869	1869	Carlos Manuel de Céspedes	Accredited in Peru and Bolivia.
Manuel Márquez Sterling	MP	1869	1878	Carlos Manuel de Céspedes	Representing the so-called Republic in Arms. In 1872, his son of the same name was born in Lima while he was in office.
1902: Relations formally established between Cuba and Peru
Manuel Márquez Sterling	MEP	August 26, 1911	1913	José Miguel Gómez	First representative of Cuba to Peru. He was received on August 26 by then president Augusto B. Leguía.
Charles Aguirre y Santiuste	MEP	1913	1913	José Miguel Gómez	Resigned after a few months in office.
Carlos de Armenteros y de Cárdenas	MEP	1913	1915	Mario García Menocal	
Nicolás de Cárdenas y Chappotin	MEP	1915	1918	Mario García Menocal	He arrived to Lima on May 5, alongside the legation's secretary, Calixto Whitmarsh García.
José Luis Gómez Garriga	CdA	December 1916	1918	Mario García Menocal	
Luis Alejandro Baralt y Peoli	MEP	1918	1925	Mario García Menocal	Named in 1918, he was the husband of Blanche Zacharie Hutchings and the father of playwright Luis A. Baralt.
Enrique J. Varona Roura	EEMP	1925	1930	Gerardo Machado	
Orlando Freyre y Cisneros	EEMP	1935	March 30, 1937	Carlos Mendieta	The embassy was left in charge of consul Luis Duany Griñán after the end of his term.
Alberto Díaz Pardo	MEP	1938	1938	Federico Laredo Brú	Agrément granted on March 21, 1938.
Emilio Núñez Portuondo	MEP	November 15, 1938		Federico Laredo Brú	Núñez presented his credentials on November 15.
Manuel Wall González	EE*	December 1, 1939	December 1939	Federico Laredo Brú	Sent to the inauguration of Manuel Prado Ugarteche.
Miguel A. Xiques Macías	AEP	1955	1959	Fulgencio Batista	Xiques arrived on February 1, presenting his credentials on the 9th.
Luis Ricardo Alonso	AEP	February 1959	October 23, 1960	Manuel Urrutia Lleó	He left Peru after his pro-Castro activities were uncovered by police. This incident led to Peru severing relations with Cuba on December of the same year.
1960–1972 Relations severed
Antonio Núñez Jiménez	AEP	1972	1978	Osvaldo Dorticós	
Pedro Díaz Arce	AEP	July 13, 1992	1997	Fidel Castro	He was one of the hostages during the Japanese embassy hostage crisis.
Benigno Pérez Fernández	AEP	1997	2002	Fidel Castro	
Rogelio Sierra Díaz	AEP	2002	2006	Fidel Castro	
Luis Delfín Pérez Osorio	AEP	2006	2011	Fidel Castro	He was named in September 2006. In 2011, he was decorated for his efforts during the 2007 Peru earthquake.
Juana Martínez González	AEP	November 18, 2011		Raúl Castro	
Sergio González Gonzáles	AEP	2016	November 2021	Raúl Castro	
Carlos Rafael Zamora Rodríguez	AEP	December 2021	October 28, 2025	Miguel Díaz-Canel	
Argelio Labrada Cruz	CdA	October 28, 2025	Incumbent	Miguel Díaz-Canel	

== See also ==
- Cuba–Peru relations
- Embassy of Peru, Havana
- List of ambassadors of Peru to Cuba
