= Cuba–Peru relations =

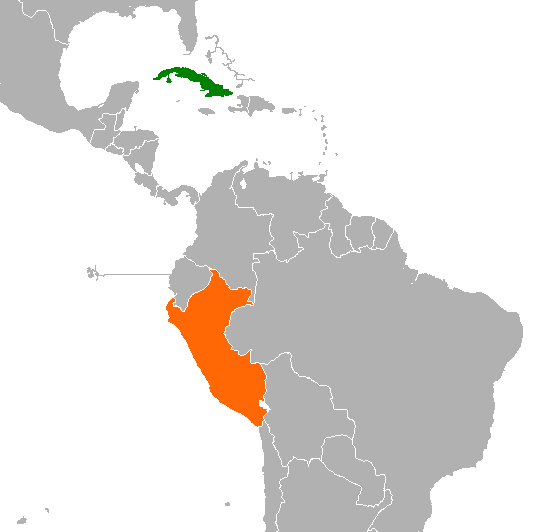

- Cuba: Peru

Diplomatic mission
- Embassy of Cuba, Lima: Embassy of Peru, Havana

Cuba–Peru relations are the relations between the Republic of Cuba and the Republic of Peru. Both nations belonged to the Spanish Empire until Peru's independence in 1821, Cuba wouldn't gain its independence until 1902 when the US occupation ended following the Spanish-American War. Both are members of the Community of Latin American and Caribbean States (CELAC) and the United Nations.

== History ==
Relations between the South American states of Cuba and Peru have been troubled since the Cuban Revolution brought Fidel Castro to power in 1959. Like all other states in the Americas apart from Canada and Mexico, Peru broke off diplomatic relationships with the newly communist Cuba on 30 December 1960. While diplomatic ties were re-established on 8 July 1972, under the dictatorship of Juan Velasco Alvarado, the relationship has since been rocked by a succession of incidents. Tensions were aggravated by the Cold War, with Peru tending to side with the US, while Cuba was a loyal ally of the Soviet Union. A destabilizing factor specific to the bilateral relationship was the alleged Cuban support for the Túpac Amaru Revolutionary Movement, a terrorist group that operated in remote rural areas of Peru.

=== Mariel boatlift of 1980 ===
A small group of Cuban citizens took sanctuary at the Peruvian embassy by smashing through the perimeter fence in a bus. Cuba asked embassy officials to hand the Cubans over to Cuban security officials. Peru refused and the Cuban government responded by withdrawing the Cuban security officers who protected the embassy. About 10,000 Cubans then sought asylum at the embassy. Cuba then opened the port of Mariel and allowed Cubans who wanted to emigrate to leave by boat, prompting the exodus of approximately 125,000.

=== Post Cold War Era ===
The relationship remained rocky even after the cold war ended. An example incident followed Peru's support for a 2004 UN resolution critical of Cuba's human rights record. This prompted Fidel Castro to speak out strongly against Peru and her president, leading Peru to respond by recalling her ambassador. By 2010, the general improvement in Cuba's foreign relations that had followed the ascension of U.S. President Barack Obama had lost momentum. However both Cuba and Peru were quick to lay aside their differences as they co-operated in delivering humanitarian relief for victims of the 2010 Chile earthquake.

After the death of Fidel Castro in 2016, a large amount of flower arrangements were left in the Cuban embassy in Lima. Five years later, during the 2021 Cuban protests, the embassy—now in another location—was vandalized by unknown individuals who threw red paint at the building.

== Resident diplomatic missions ==
- Cuba has an embassy in Lima.
- Peru has an embassy in Havana.
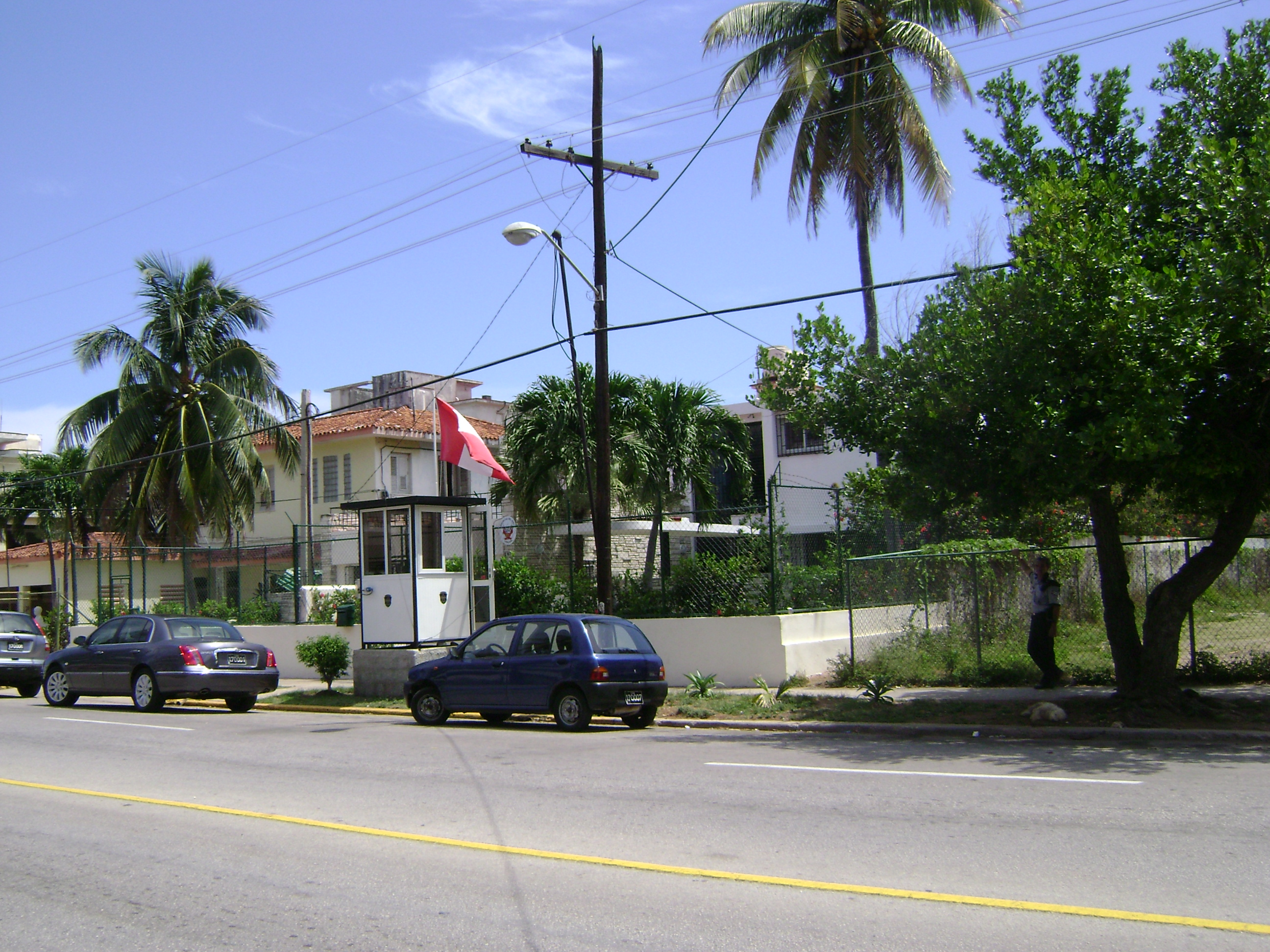
Embassy of Peru in Havana

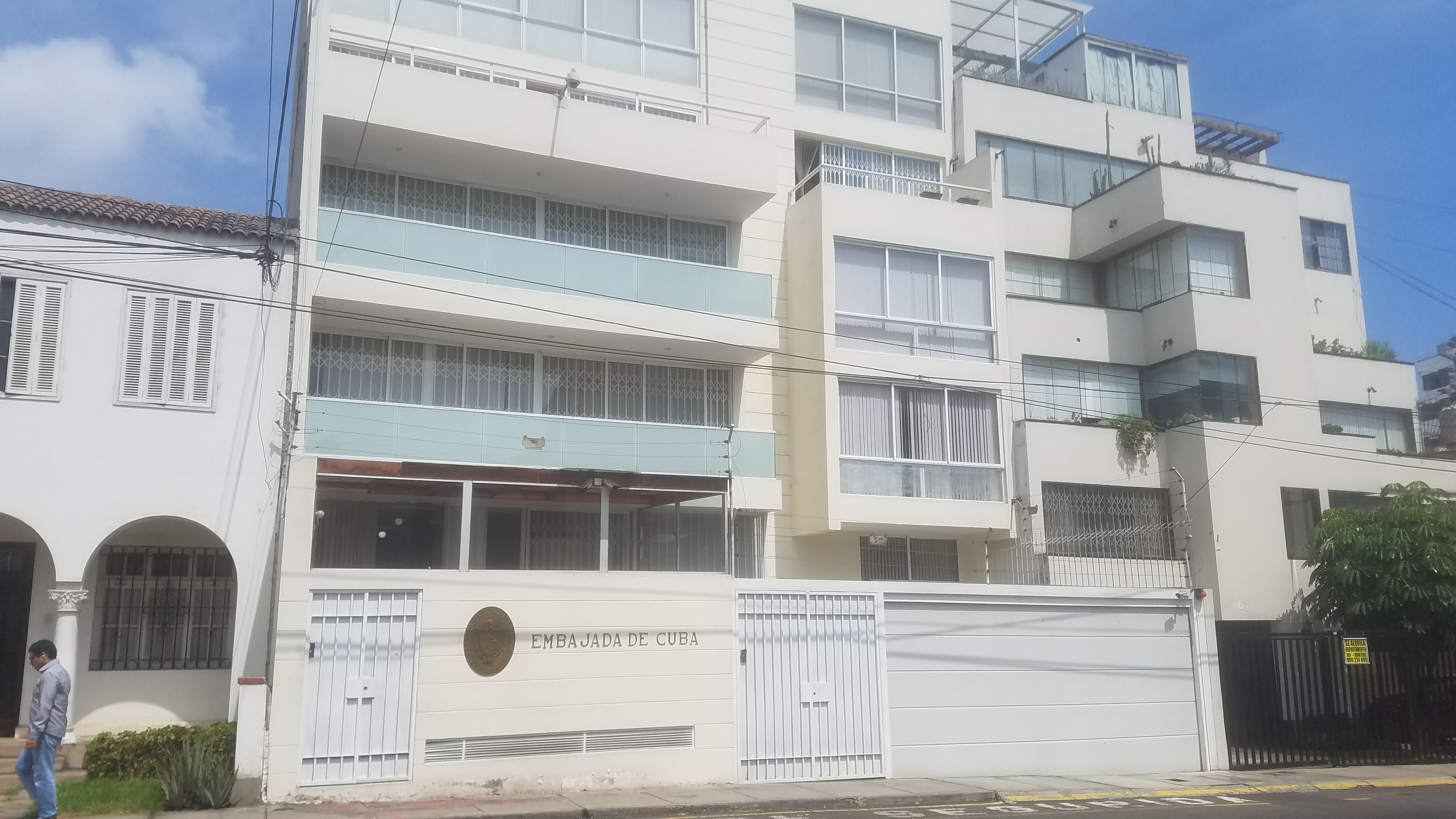
Embassy of Cuba in Lima

== See also ==
- List of ambassadors of Cuba to Peru
- List of ambassadors of Peru to Cuba
