= Baralt =

Baralt may refer to:

- Baralt (surname)
- Baralt Municipality, Venezuela
- Baralt Theatre, Venezuela
- Baralt Tunnel, Caracas, Venezuela
