= Havana Peruvian embassy crisis =

1980 diplomatic crisis

- Part of the Cuban exodus
- Cuban asylum-seekers in front of the embassy
- Native name: Crisis de la Embajada peruana de La Habana
- Date: 1 April 1980
- Location: Embassy of Peru, Havana
- Patrons: Fidel Castro; Jimmy Carter; Ernesto Pinto-Bazurco, Jr. Rodrigo Carazo
- Participants: Government of Costa Rica; Government of Cuba; Government of Peru; Government of United States; Government of Argentina; Government of Venezuela

On April 1, 1980, six Cuban citizens made their way into the Peruvian embassy in Havana, Cuba, instigating an international crisis over the diplomatic status of around 10,000 asylum-seeking Cubans who joined them over the following days. The Peruvian ambassador, Ernesto Pinto Bazurco Rittler, spearheaded the effort to protect Cubans, most of whom were disapproved of by Fidel Castro’s regime and were seeking protection at the embassy. This episode marked the start of the Cuban refugee crisis, which was followed by a series of diplomatic initiatives between various countries in both North and South America that tried to organize the fleeing of people from the island of Cuba to the United States and elsewhere. The embassy crisis culminated with the substantial exodus of 125,266 Cuban asylum-seekers during the Mariel Boatlift.

== Background ==
The underlying causes behind the events of April 1, and thereafter, have been attributed in large part as a response to the prevalence of economic trouble and the decline in living standards afflicting many Cubans, particularly amongst the youth and educated demographic of the population. According to historian Ronald Copeland, such economic misfortune was due to a combination of rising inflation and poor markets, which in turn, contributed to the short-term downward trajectory of the Cuban economy during the late 1970s. Both worked in tandem to weaken the predominantly agriculture-based economy; the former increasing the costs of agricultural inputs needed for production, while the latter reducing the level of disposable income received for the tobacco and sugar crops. Furthermore, decreasing employee performance in conjunction with low morale further contributed to lower productive output.

In addition to the unfavorable economic climate, social and political factors combined to exacerbate both Cuba's domestic and international relations. The Cuban state's decision to begin rationing the distribution of food during this period further contributed to widespread discontent throughout the population. Simultaneously, the spirit and morale of the Cuban revolution was harmed by the death of major revolutionary figures such as Celia Sanchez, Alejo Carpentier, and the suicide of Haydee Santamaria. The increasing levels of social tension resulting from the economic hardships imposed on many Cubans during this period manifested themselves through a chain of instances involving forcible entrances into Latin American embassies in Havana, occurring prior to the events precipitated on April 1, with a majority of its actors seeking political asylum.

Episodes of such embassy intrusions included a group of 25 asylum-seekers penetrating the Peruvian embassy, 15 into the Venezuelan embassy, and one into the Argentinian embassy. Despite assertions from Cuban officials rejecting the would-be exiles’ claim for diplomatic protection, upon the false premise of them being petty criminals as opposed to legitimate political dissidents, both the Peruvian and Venezuelan embassies continued to receive Cubans. The decision on behalf of these Latin American countries to grant asylum to those entering embassy compounds was received with much criticism by the Cuban government, for both Venezuela and Peru had refused to facilitate legal immigration from Cuba during this period.

== Crisis ==
On April 1, 1980, six Cuban asylum-seekers crashed through the entrance of Peru’s embassy complex in Havana using a city bus. The incident cost the life of a Cuban soldier who was mortally wounded by a ricocheting bullet, whilst two of the bus’s passengers sustained minor injuries. Following the incident, Fidel Castro, already frustrated by the series of preceding activities by such asylum-seekers, publicly declared via the official state newspaper GRANMA that all those forcefully entering a foreign embassy thereafter would lose their right to safe departure from Cuba.

On April 4, the Castro administration pivoted their position, announcing the lifting of all protective mechanisms from the Peruvian embassy in Havana, with the intention of providing all those desiring to leave the country with the opportunity of doing so. The primary reason for Castro’s policy shift was articulated in GRANMA as a response to the perceived tolerance of the Peruvian government toward “criminals”. In the articles, those seeking refuge in the embassy labeled “scum, criminals, lumpen, parasites, and antisocial elements'' whilst their pleas for diplomatic asylum were invalidated as “none of them were subject to political persecution”. Castro critic and poet-activist Reinaldo Arenas described how protesters organized by the regime waited outside the embassy in order to violently assault refugee-seekers. These aggressive acts and protests outside of the embassy allegedly lasted days. Regardless of motive, the decision delegated the onus of the asylum-seeker issue on the shoulders of Cuba's Latin American counterparts, particularly Peru.

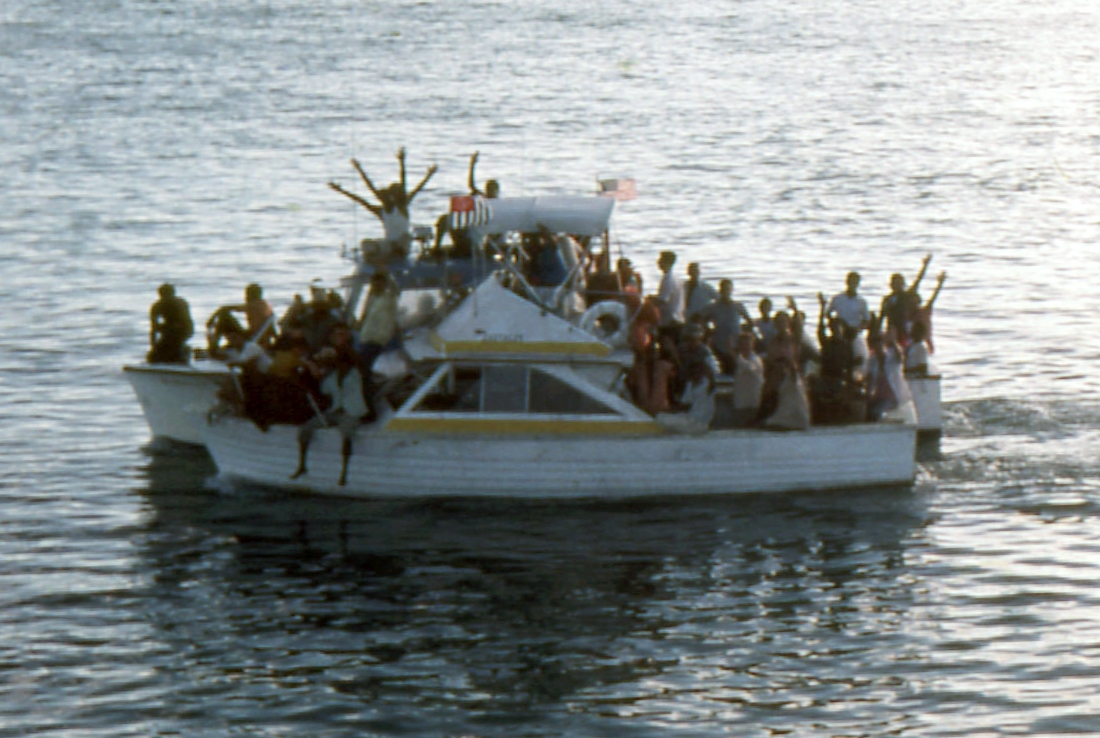
Overcrowded Cuban boats headed to the U.S

The Castro administration's actions sparked both confusion and alarm amongst the six-member contingent of the Peruvian diplomatic legation situated in Havana, headed by Ernesto Pinto-Bazurco Rittler. Aside from concerns regarding the safety of his colleagues, Rittler questioned what would become of the 25 Cuban asylum-seekers already residing in the embassy, most of whom had gatecrashed their way through. Over 300 people had entered through the unguarded embassy compounds by midnight on April 4 and by the early hours of April 5th, this number had risen to 500. Thereafter, the influx of asylum-seekers increased exponentially.

After personally witnessing the stream of asylum-seekers flood the embassy compounds, Fidel Castro requested a meeting with Ernesto Pinto Bazurco Rittler on the morning of April 5. During the negotiations, Castro and Rittler discussed the undetermined status of Cubans inside the Peruvian embassy, particularly on whether they should be considered refugees or asylum-seekers. Ultimately, both settled on the term “emigrating people” as the official label. While these negotiations took place, the number of Cubans entering the embassy compound had swiftly risen to over 10,000. Castro's ploy to embarrass Peru while setting a precedent for other Latin American embassies in Cuba was quickly turning into an embarrassment for the Cuban communist regime as the increasing number of asylum-seekers vastly exceeded the few “malcontents” Castro had anticipated.

On the morning of April 6, Castro announced the official closure of the embassy compound, with barricades erected to block off the area from further asylum-seekers. The Cuban government also consented to guarantee the safety of the Peruvian embassy, given that some of the emigrating persons had forced their way onto the embassy grounds. Nonetheless, the police guard was withdrawn, which represented a violation of the Vienna Convention on Diplomatic Relations.

During the 38-hour period in which guards were absent, 10,865 Cubans had filed into the 2,000 square-meter embassy compound, with many more potential asylum-seekers denied access and subsequently arrested by Cuban authorities. In an attempt to de-escalate tensions while mitigating the political impact of the situation for the Castro administration, Cuban government officials offered green "safe-conduct" passes to the refugees which provided them with the option to leave the embassy and return home until they could procure exit visas. Under Castro's guarantee of safety, several thousand of those in the embassy agreed to this arrangement, with 1,730 of the 10,865 people accepting the pass on its first day, followed by an additional 1,000.

To organize the people within the embassy, one of the first actions was to form a central commission to coordinate the communal lives of the people at the embassy. The central commission found that of 3,000, of the 7,020 people the people surveyed were men, while 1,320 were women. This left 2,700 as children and 150 former political prisoners. There were 34 people who had actually been under the diplomatic protection of the embassy during the preceding months. The refugee seekers in the embassy were running out of food and Peruvian officials could not help, as food was bought with Cuban ration cards.

== Response ==
=== International response ===
The dramatic influx of several thousand asylum-seekers into the 22-acre compound of the Peruvian embassy provoked widespread concern within the American hemisphere regarding geographic potentialities surrounding resettlement programs. Despite initially stating the embassy crisis to be a Latin American issue, President Jimmy Carter entered the United States into the situation following his appearance before the Caribbean Action Group on April 9, in which he publicly declared his support for those Cubans temporarily housed within the embassy. Additionally, throughout the U.S., Cuban exile communities, particularly in Miami, organized rallies and demonstrations in conjunction with efforts to raise food and money for those would-be exiles as a sign of diasporic solidarity with their stranded compatriots. By April 14, several Latin American countries, along with the U.S., reached an agreement to evacuate the Peruvian embassy, with each country announcing separate arrangements regarding the number of Cubans it would take in. Spearheading this effort, Costa Rica’s president Rodrigo Carazo volunteered his country as the first asylum destination for the affected Cubans, while pressing international organizations to assist in the facilitation of airlifting refugees to various destinations. Following Costa Rica, the United States agreed to admit up to 3,500 embassy refugees.

By May 14, 1980, 37,085 refugees had entered Washington. Due to resource depletion at all governmental levels, public polling showed decreasing approval for the admission of Cubans into the United States.

President Carter’s attempt of internationalism in solving the crisis became more difficult than initially planned. The goal was to broadcast the crisis in such a manner that Castro would be ashamed to continue his campaign against the refugees. This attempt suffered due to Mexico turning away from the American plan.

=== Impact on Castro's regime ===
The Peruvian embassy crisis acted as the perfect conditions for Castro’s regime to push for anti-American propaganda domestically. Patriotism was celebrated within the regime and movement between the United States and Cuba was heavily ridiculed. Castro successfully fought back against U.S president Carter, but at the expense of his policy toward the Cuban community abroad, many of whom interpreted the “Havana Ten Thousand” as a clear indictment of Castro and his revolutionary project. The Peruvian embassy crisis in Havana led to a nationwide realization of the number of people who desperately wanted to leave the country. For Castro, this delegitimized his position as Cuba's leader on the international political stage, which led to harsher and more forceful attempts to restore Cuba's internal order and public image. Even neutral institutions such as “Casa de las Américas'' were obligated by the regime to take a position against immigrants and refugee-seekers. Several defamation campaigns against those wishing to emigrate out of Cuba, including the government-sponsored campaign launched in the GRANMA newspaper, encouraged violence and hostility towards such people. A large contingent of Castro supporters reverberated such rhetoric, branding such asylum-seekers as ungrateful “escorias” (“scums”) for attempting to discredit the validity of the revolution and all it had purportedly achieved. Days before Castro's announcement of an impending boatlift to be facilitated at the port city of Mariel on April 20, over a million Cubans demonstrated their support for the Cuban regime through a march in front of the Peruvian embassy in Havana.

Castro's government strategically used the Cuban press to condemn the refugees as enemies of the State and traitors. Castro's regime controlled the media to successfully incite the rage of Cubans. This allowed him to adopt greater surveillance policies against the increasing number of traitors and to strengthen his support. The press utilized symbolism of the Cuban War for independence which caused civilians to form mobs and force refugees to state their illegal actions.

=== Andean Pact effects ===
The Peruvian Embassy crisis caused rifts between the Latin American countries and Castro's government. Peru called for "an eventual break" of relations with Cuba despite supporting its unsuccessful bid for a seat on the United Nations Security Council. Venezuela requested "evidence on the part of Cuba that it knows how to appraise its relations with our country" as it sided with refugees and the right to seek asylum. Nevertheless, Venezuela and Peru worked to end the boycott of Cuba economically by the U.S.

== Aftermath ==
This incident opened a new chapter in international law and peacemaking in Latin America and led to the Mariel boatlift – a mass emigration of about 125,000 Cubans to the U.S. The crisis also led many Cubans to start seeking refuge in other foreign embassies in the capital, leading to a massive international effort between the U.S., European and Latin American countries in order to receive the Cubans fleeing Castro's regime. The Peruvian ambassador Ernesto Pinto Bazurco Rittler received the Palmer Award in 2011 and was nominated for the Nobel Peace Prize in 2016 for his commitment to defend human rights in Cuba.

=== Refugee resettlement ===
Fort Chaffee, Arkansas, was one of several resettlement camps in the United States for the refugees. As well, the United States’ historical preference for lighter-skinned immigrants contrasts with the refugee crisis as the perceived racial and class differences of the Marielitos, was overlooked as they were more importantly anti-communist.

Between March and April 1980 the more orderly phase of the emigration involved air flights to Costa Rica and eventual resettlement in several countries, including Costa Rica, Peru, Spain, and the United States.

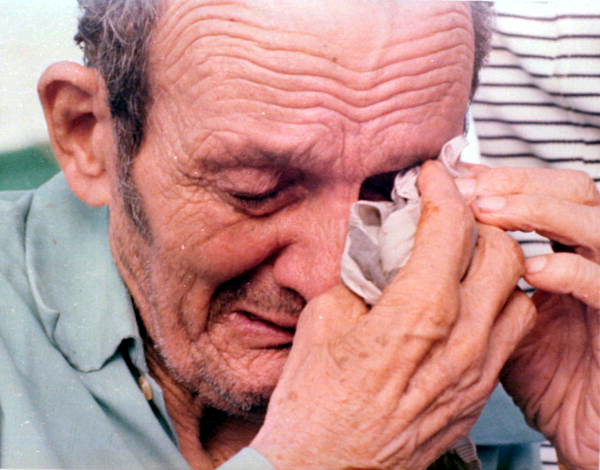
Cuban refugee landing in the U.S

It was unclear whether Cuban immigrants entering during the Mariel boatlift would be granted the same level of preferential treatment given to previous Cuban immigrants. In fact, few Mariel Cubans were defined as either political refugees or seekers of asylum. Instead, they were issued "paroles," and a new category was created for them: "Cuban-Haitian entrant (status pending)." This ambiguous status allowed them physical but not legal entrance into the country and became the foundation for the systematic denial of rights to Mariel Cubans. Also, unlike previous Cuban immigrants who had been processed by the Cuban Refugee Program, this new wave became "the first sizeable group of Cuban immigrants to experience the Immigration and Naturalization Service's personnel and operations". Therefore, most Mariel Cubans encountered more difficult immigration procedures and policy hurdles than had the post-1959 Cuban immigrant.

=== Gender and sexuality ===
The state of Cuba used the rhetoric that those who were leaving were primarily visible homosexuals, which follows a long trend of official discourses and state policies stigmatizing the community. As a result, the crisis allowed for the Cuban government to justify their expulsion as they were traitors to the state. Public display of homosexuality was the main target of the regime through humiliation in choices in clothing, mannerisms and speech. Refugees who did not consider themselves homosexuals claimed to be homosexual in order to leave the country. Furthermore, Black Cubans made up 75 percent of Cubans awaiting sponsorship in Fort Chaffee in October 1980 long after the establishment of all camps. Gender and marital status also affected a refugee's chance at finding sponsorship as single males found greater difficulties in finding a sponsor than families and single females.

== Cultural impact ==
The desperation of many Cubans to seek refuge that was first seen in the 1980 Peruvian embassy crisis and the several human rights violations within the island, inspired many pieces of literature, films, and documentaries; while marking the beginning of photojournalism in Cuba. The first Cuban short film to be made about the refugee crisis was Laura, directed by Ana Rodriguez in 1990. Ana was later taken as a political prisoner by Castro's regime and was sent to jail for 19 years. The crisis also inspired other cinematographic works such as La Anunciación (2008) by Enrique Pineda Barnet and Memorias del Desarrollo (2010) by Miguel Coyula. The pictures taken by Santiago Alvarez showed the violence that surrounded the Peruvian embassy and the Mariel Boatlift and were used for the documentary Sueños al Parío, which had a sizeable cultural impact in and outside of Cuba. This documentary was censored by Castro's regime.
