= Baralt (surname) =

Baralt is a surname. Notable people with the surname include:

- Blanche Zacharie de Baralt (1865/66–1950), American author
- David Carrión Baralt (born 1957), Puerto Rican military officer
- Guillermo A. Baralt (born 1948), Puerto Rican historian
- Luce López-Baralt (born 1944), Puerto Rican scholar and essayist
- Luis Alejandro Baralt Zacharie (1892–1969), Cuban playwright
- Rafael María Baralt (1810–1860), Venezuelan diplomat
