= Fort Chaffee Maneuver Training Center =

Military installation of the Arkansas Army National Guard

Coordinates: 35.270°N 94.202°W

Fort Chaffee Joint Maneuver Training Center
- Part of Arkansas National Guard; United States Army Reserve
- Fort Smith, Arkansas
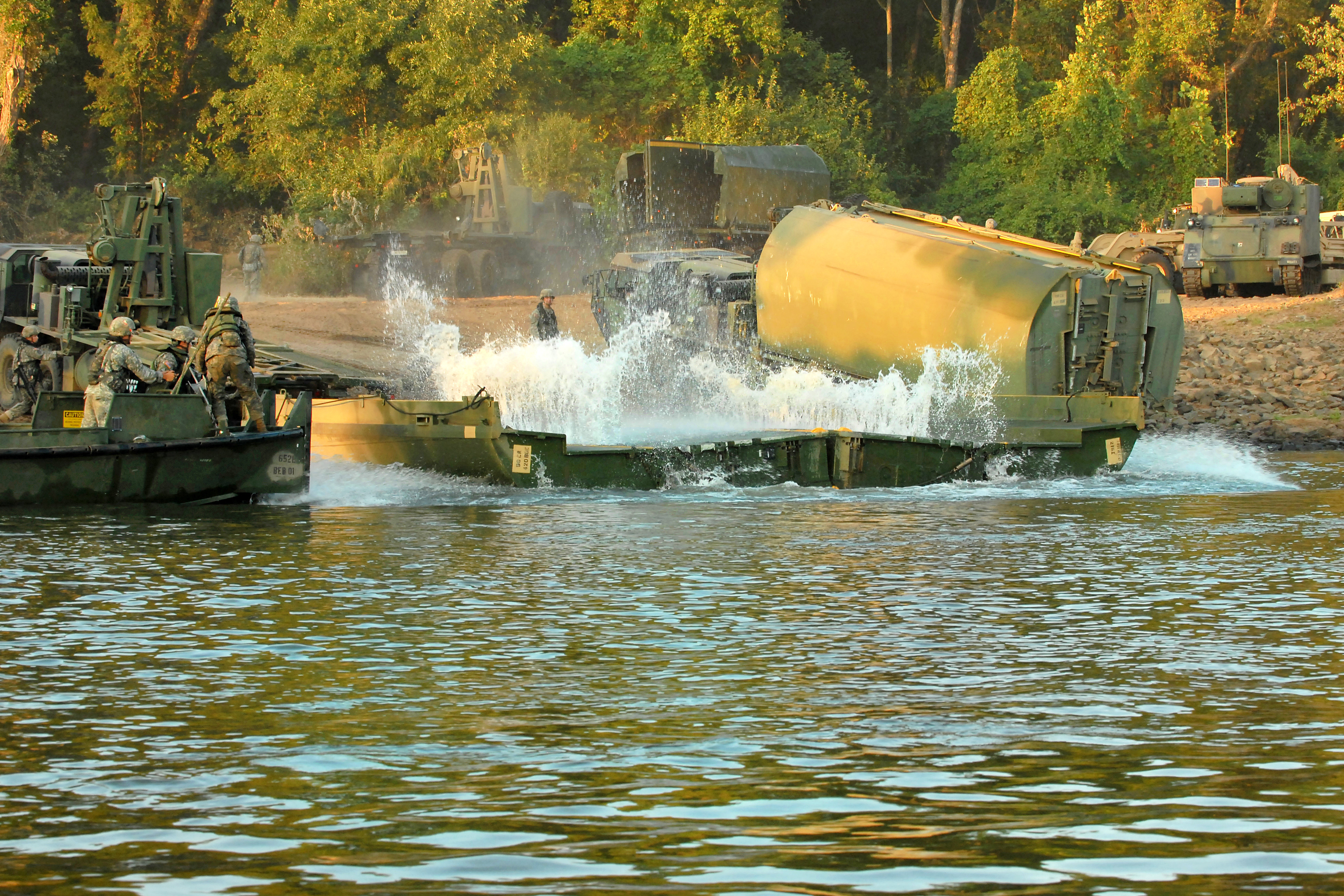
- U.S. Army Reserve soldiers of the 652nd Engineer Company (Multi-Role Bridge), from Ellsworth, Wis., launch and position bridge bay sections during "River Assault 2011" at Fort Chaffee.

Site information
- Type: National Guard Training Camp
- Owner: Arkansas
- Controlled by: Arkansas National Guard
- Open to the public: Prior Permission needed

Site history
- Built: 1941
- Built by: United States Army
- In use: 1941-Present
- Battles/wars: World War II, Cold War

Garrison information
- Occupants: U.S. Army, Arkansas National Guard

Fort Chaffee Joint Maneuver Training Center, also known as Fort Chaffee, is an Arkansas Army National Guard installation located in western Arkansas, adjacent to the city of Fort Smith. Established as Camp Chaffee in 1941, renamed to Fort Chaffee in 1956, it has served as a U.S. Army base, training camp, prisoner-of-war camp, and refugee camp. The fort was realigned following the 1995 Base Realignment and Closure Commission round. Since that time, the Arkansas National Guard has been using 66,000 acres (270 km^{2}) as a training facility. The State of Arkansas received 6,000 acres (24 km^{2}), about half of which have been redeveloped as of 2014. The main environmental concern has been asbestos, released during various fires.

== Location ==
Fort Chaffee is just outside Fort Smith (Sebastian County) and Barling (Sebastian County) on Arkansas Highway 22, 1 mi (1.6 km) southeast of Fort Smith Regional Airport. The Arkansas River flows eastward along its northern border and Interstate 40 is 5 mi (8.0 km) to the north on the opposite side of the river.

== History ==
Fort Chaffee was originally named Camp Chaffee. The camp was named after Major General Adna R. Chaffee Jr., a Cavalry officer who, in Europe during World War I, determined that the cavalry was outmoded and, unlike other cavalry officers, advocated for the use of tanks.

The groundbreaking of Camp Chaffee was held on 20 September 1941, as part of the Department of War's preparations to double the size of the U.S. Army in the face of World War II. That month, the U.S. government paid $1,350,000 (equivalent to $29,550,339 in 2025) to acquire 15,163 acres (61.36 km^{2}) from 712 property owners, including families, farms, businesses, churches, schools, and other government agencies. It took only sixteen months to build the entire base. The first soldiers arrived on 7 December 1941, the day of the Japanese attack on Pearl Harbor, Hawaii. The installation was activated on March 27, 1942 and from 1942 to 1946, the 6th, 14th and 16th Armored Divisions trained there. The creation of the camp caused the nearby town of Barling to experience a tremendous boom in housing and businesses. Fort Chaffee also served as a prisoner-of-war-camp during World War II, housing 3,000 German prisoners of war.

From 1948 to 1957, Chaffee was the home of the 5th Armored Division. On March 21, 1956, the name of Camp Chaffee was officially changed to Fort Chaffee in recognition of the permanent nature of the base. For four days in 1958, Chaffee was home to Elvis Presley, who as part of his induction into the Army received his first military haircut in Building 803. In 1959, the "Home of the U.S. Army Training Center, Field Artillery" moved from Fort Chaffee to Fort Sill, Oklahoma, where it remains to this day.

The Berlin Crises of the early 1960's resulted in Fort Chaffee being opened as a Basic training facility for Army recruits. Kentucky's 100th Infantry Division, last fully active during the Second World War, was activated and moved to Fort Chaffee where they ran a complete eight week basic training operation for thousands of Army recruits during the early 60's including an Advanced Infantry Training (AIT) course for those recruits assigned to infantry units throughout the Army.

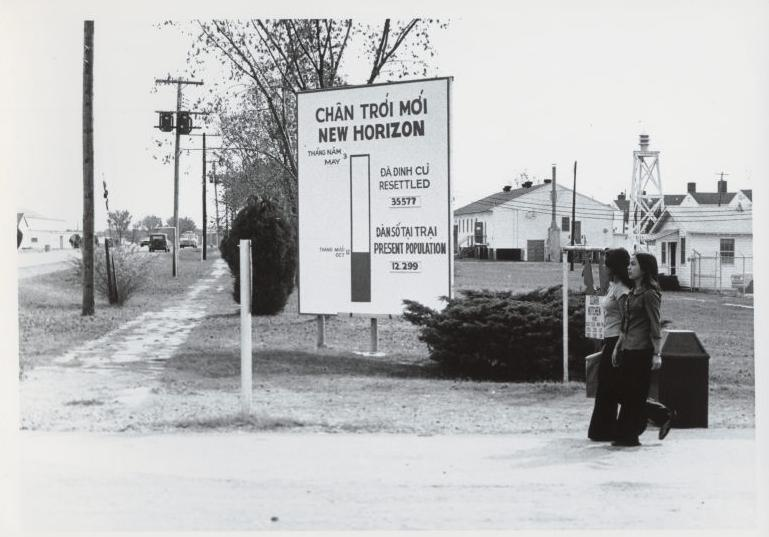
This sign, titled "New Horizon" in front of Fort Chaffee showed the number of Vietnamese and Cambodian refugees who had lived at the camp and had been subsequently resettled, as well as the number still living there.

Fort Chaffee housed refugees three times; from 1975 to 1976 it was a processing center for refugees from Southeast Asia and held Vietnamese and Cambodian refugees after the Vietnam and Cambodia wars. The facility processed 50,809 refugees of the Vietnam War, giving them medical screenings, matching them with sponsors, and arranging for their resettlement in the United States.

In 1980, Fort Chaffee became a Cuban refugee resettlement center, holding 19,000 Cubans after the Mariel boatlift and briefly making the camp the 11th largest city in Arkansas. The Cubans were brought to the fort in early May, and there were delays in processing and resettlement caused by "bureaucratic setbacks and rumors (later proven true) that Chaffee was full of Cuban criminals released from prison by Fidel Castro." On June 1, the detainees rioted, destroying four barracks and fighting with State Police officers and National Guardsmen. 62 refugees were injured and 46 others were arrested. After the riots, the previously unsecured facility was turned into a prison, encircled with miles of concertina wire and 2,000 heavily armed federal troops. The riot was a major issue in Frank D. White's victory over Governor Bill Clinton in the November 1980 gubernatorial election. Over two years, Fort Chaffee processed 25,390 Cuban refugees.

In 1987, the Joint Readiness Training Center (JRTC) began training soldiers at Chaffee. In 1993 the JRTC was transferred to Fort Polk, Louisiana and in 1995, the Base Realignment and Closure Commission recommended the closure of Fort Chaffee. The recommendation was approved with the condition that minimum essential ranges, facilities, and training areas were maintained as a Reserve component training enclave. On September 28, 1995, Fort Chaffee became a subinstallation of Fort Sill. In late 1995, the federal government declared 7,192 acres (29.10 km^{2}) of Fort Chaffee's 76,075 acres (307.86 km^{2}) to be surplus and turned the land over to the state, while the remaining 66,000 acres (270 km^{2}) were turned over to the Arkansas National Guard for use as a training facility.

On September 27, 1997 command of Fort Chaffee was transferred from the U.S. Army to the Arkansas Army National Guard when the U.S. Army garrison was deactivated, with Fort Chaffee subsequently becoming the Chaffee Maneuver Training Center for Light Combat Forces, and later simply Chaffee Joint Maneuver Training Center. The Arkansas Air National Guard stationed at Ebbing Air National Guard Base in Fort Smith has used the fort's Razorback Range for target practice with their A-10s until January 2014 when their mission changed, but Razorback Range remained under the control of the 188th Wing.

On April 15, 2014 the Arkansas National Guard's new Fort Chaffee Combined Arms Collective Training Facility opened; the $26 million training center consisting of 18 buildings is meant to recreate a small city and includes 189 cameras.

In September 2017, the Arkansas Air National Guard at Ebbing Air National Guard Base transferred Razorback Range back to the control of Chaffee Joint Maneuver Training Center.

== Redevelopment ==
In 1997 the Fort Chaffee Redevelopment Authority was established to redevelop the 7,000 acres (28 km^{2}) acres that were turned over to the state. This included demolishing more than 700 buildings and rezoning land. Redevelopment of the base began shortly after land was turned over, and the redevelopment authority is overseeing a number of residential, commercial, and industrial projects in what is known as 'Chaffee Crossing'.

After property transfers were complete and with minimal military staff permanently stationed, the Chaffee Maneuver Training Center was declared an open post. The gatehouses were abandoned, and most of the fencing was removed. Military police patrols were discontinued, and emergency services turned over to the city of Barling and the Arkansas State Police Troop H. After the September 11, 2001, terrorist attacks all Army installations in the U.S. were declared closed posts, and the center again took over emergency services.

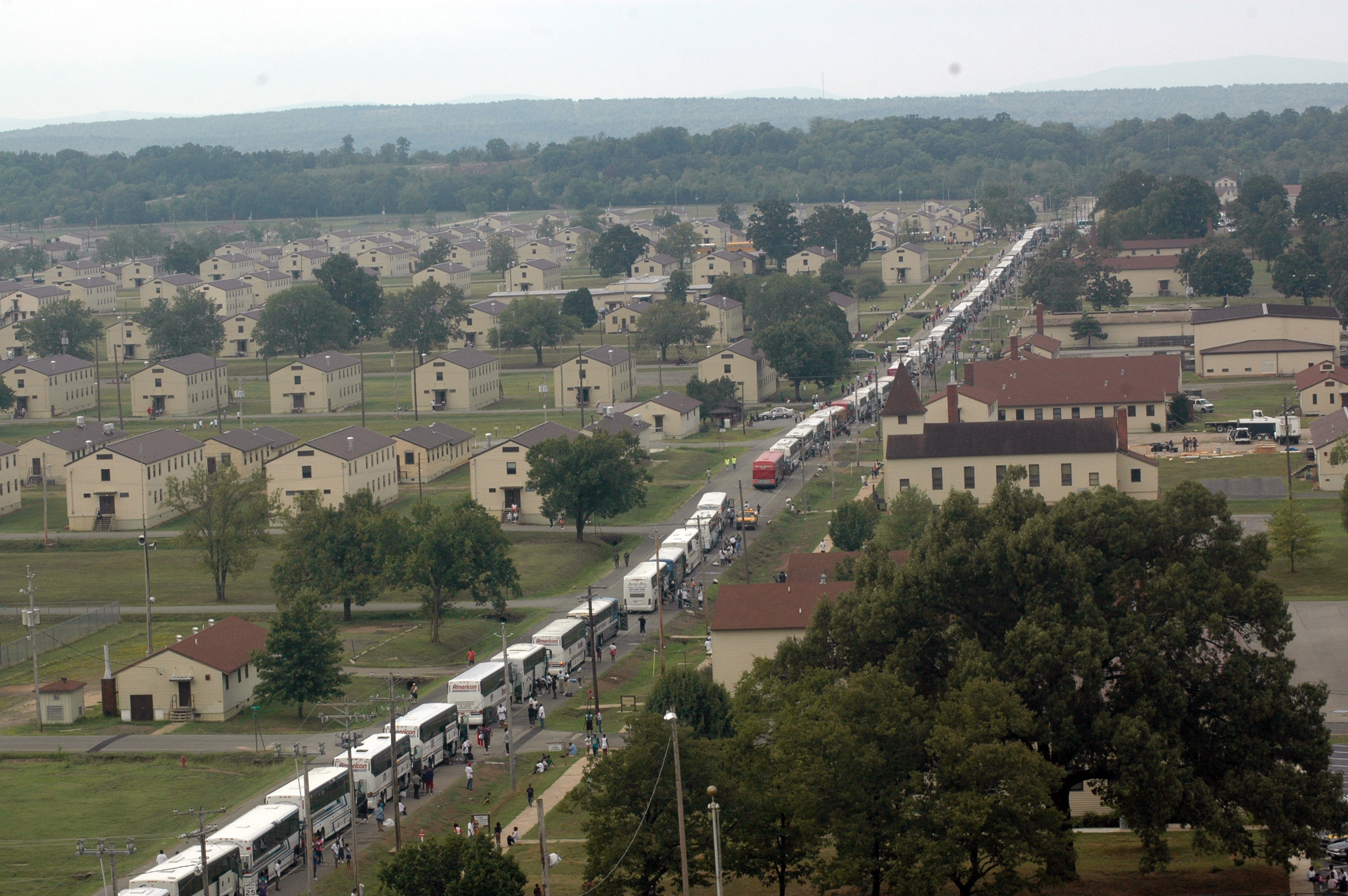
Busses loaded with Hurricane Katrina refugees arrive at Fort Chaffee

On January 6, 2005, ground was broken for the 170 acres (0.69 km^{2}) Janet Huckabee Arkansas River Valley Nature Center. In September 2005 Fort Chaffee housed evacuees after Hurricane Katrina struck Louisiana. The empty barracks were converted into temporary housing for more than 10,000 refugees from Louisiana, Mississippi, Texas, and other areas affected by the hurricane. Many of the evacuees that were sponsored or temporarily housed at Fort Chaffee have since decided to make Fort Smith their new home, which has brought a slight increase to the city's economy.

In September 2011, a rectangular block of the base, containing 44 World War II-era barracks buildings, was listed on the National Register of Historic Places. Bounded by Terry and Ellis Streets and Darby and Ward Avenues, these barracks were built 1941-42 to house two tank destroyer battalions. The district was slightly enlarged in 2015.

During 2013, Chaffee has seen a mix of developments, with the announcement of a new 70 store shopping center along Arkansas Highways 22 and 59, the creation of the Arkansas College of Osteopathic Medicine, an expansion of Umarex and the construction of several large housing developments. The area is also home to manufacturing facilities operated by Graphic Packaging and Mars Petcare. A wind turbine manufacturing building owned by Mitsubishi was never utilized and the more than 400 jobs planned faded when economics changed within the wind energy industry.

In May 2014 ArcBest Corp announced construction of an office building and data center to add an estimated 975 corporate jobs by 2021.

As of 2014 FCRA is down to about 3,000 acres (12 km^{2}) remaining for development, of which about 25% is intended for residential development, roughly 40% to 50% is targeted for commercial and retail development, while the remaining land is intended for industrial development.

In September 2017, the Fort Chaffee Redevelopment Authority bought back the land for the shopping center at Hwy 59 and Hwy 22 as the developer had already received 5 time extensions, and no construction had yet started.

== Environmental contamination ==
The 2008 fire uncovered the only environmental contamination to date: asbestos.

== Fires ==
During the morning hours of January 29, 2008, a mixture of high winds and fire, which local authorities determined was a brush fire that started from an electrical source, burned approximately 100 acres (0.40 km^{2}) and damaged or destroyed 150 abandoned buildings at Fort Chaffee.

On the night of August 3, 2011, a fire broke out on the 90 acre former medical complex, destroying the hospital and nearly 120 buildings in the area. This was, according to the National Weather Service, the hottest day in Fort Chaffee history at 115 degrees Fahrenheit. The fire's cause was ruled accidental before it became known that a cigarette dropped by a Kentucky National Guardsman of the 138th Fires Brigade was the culprit.

A fire destroyed an office building on June 20, 2014.

== Other uses of Fort Chaffee ==
Fort Chaffee has been used as a set for various movies, including A Soldier's Story in 1984, Biloxi Blues in 1988, The Tuskegee Airmen in 1995 and it was featured in episode 10 of the 4th season of Ghost Adventures on November 19, 2010.

It is a training station for the Department of Energy (DOE) for which their federal agents are trained at. The Office of Secure Transport (OST) at the National Nuclear Security Administration (NNSA) maintains the OST Transportation Safeguards Training Site at Fort Chaffee, where the 18-week-long Nuclear Material Courier Basic Academy for new federal agents is conducted. New OST agents are taught specialized skills from a wide range of areas, including general law enforcement tactics, physical security, firearms training and qualification, convoy operations, physical fitness, tractor-trailer driving skills, and legal issues around nuclear materials transport.

== See also ==
- National Register of Historic Places listings in Sebastian County, Arkansas
