= List of ambassadors of Peru to Cuba =

Ambassador of Peru to the Republic of Cuba
- Great Seal of Peru
- Ministry of Foreign Affairs; Calle 8 Nº 307, Miramar, Havana
- Appointer: The president of Peru
- Formation: 1902
- Website: Embassy of Peru in Cuba

The extraordinary and plenipotentiary ambassador of Peru to the Republic of Cuba is the official representative of the Republic of Peru to the Republic of Cuba.

Peru and Cuba established relations in 1902. After the Cuban Revolution, relations continued, but their troubled nature led to Peru to sever diplomatic relationships on December 30, 1960. After the establishment of Juan Velasco Alvarado's Revolutionary Government, Peru reestablished its relations with Cuba on 8 July 1972, which have remained since.

== List of representatives ==
Name	Portrait	Term begin	Term end	President	Notes
Rafael Belaúnde Diez Canseco		1936	1937	Óscar R. Benavides	Ambassador
Juan de Osma y Prado		March 1, 1938	1939	Óscar R. Benavides	Ambassador
Luis Cúneo Harrison		November 28, 1939		Óscar R. Benavides	Ambassador
Pedro Yrigoyen Diez Canseco		1944	1944	Manuel Prado Ugarteche	Ambassador. His grandson Jose Martín later served as Ambassador to Cuba from 2005 to 2006.
José Bernardo Goyburú		1945	1946	Manuel Prado Ugarteche	Ambassador
Ignacio Brandariz		1956	1960	Manuel Prado Ugarteche	Ambassador; recalled due to a scandal in Lima that led to the severing of diplomatic relations.
1960–1972: Relations severed
Joaquín Heredia Cabieses		1972	1974	Juan Velasco Alvarado	
Edgardo de Habich y Palacio		1977	1980	Francisco Morales Bermúdez	Ambassador during the Peruvian Havana Embassy Crisis of 1980
Ernesto Pinto Bazurco Rittler		1980	?	Francisco Morales Bermúdez	Interim Chargé d'Affairs. Under his tenure, the 1980 Havana Peruvian embassy crisis took place.
Armando Lecaros de Cossio				Fernando Belaúnde	Interim Chargé d'Affairs
Carlos Higueras Ramos		1986	1990	Alan García	
José Torres-Muga Jimenez		1991	1995	Alberto Fujimori	
Jaime Sobero Taira		1996	1999	Alberto Fujimori	
Juan Castilla Meza		June 1, 1999	November 27, 2000	Alberto Fujimori	
Juan Álvarez Vita		2001	2004	Alejandro Toledo	
Jose Martín Ramón Yrigoyen Yrigoyen		2005	2006	Alejandro Toledo	
Armando Román Morey		2007	2008	Alan García	
Armando Raúl Patiño Alvistur		2008	2009	Alan García	
Gilmer Calderón Cuenca		2009	2011	Alan García	
Víctor Mayorga		2011	2014	Ollanta Humala	
Hugo Eduardo Jara Facundo		2015	2016	Ollanta Humala	
Guido Octavio Toro Cornejo		May 1, 2016	October 13, 2021	Ollanta Humala	
Gonzalo Flavio Guillén Beker		March 1, 2022	December 7, 2022	Pedro Castillo	

== See also ==
- List of ambassadors of Cuba to Peru
