= Víctor Mayorga =

Peruvian politician

Víctor Mayorga Miranda
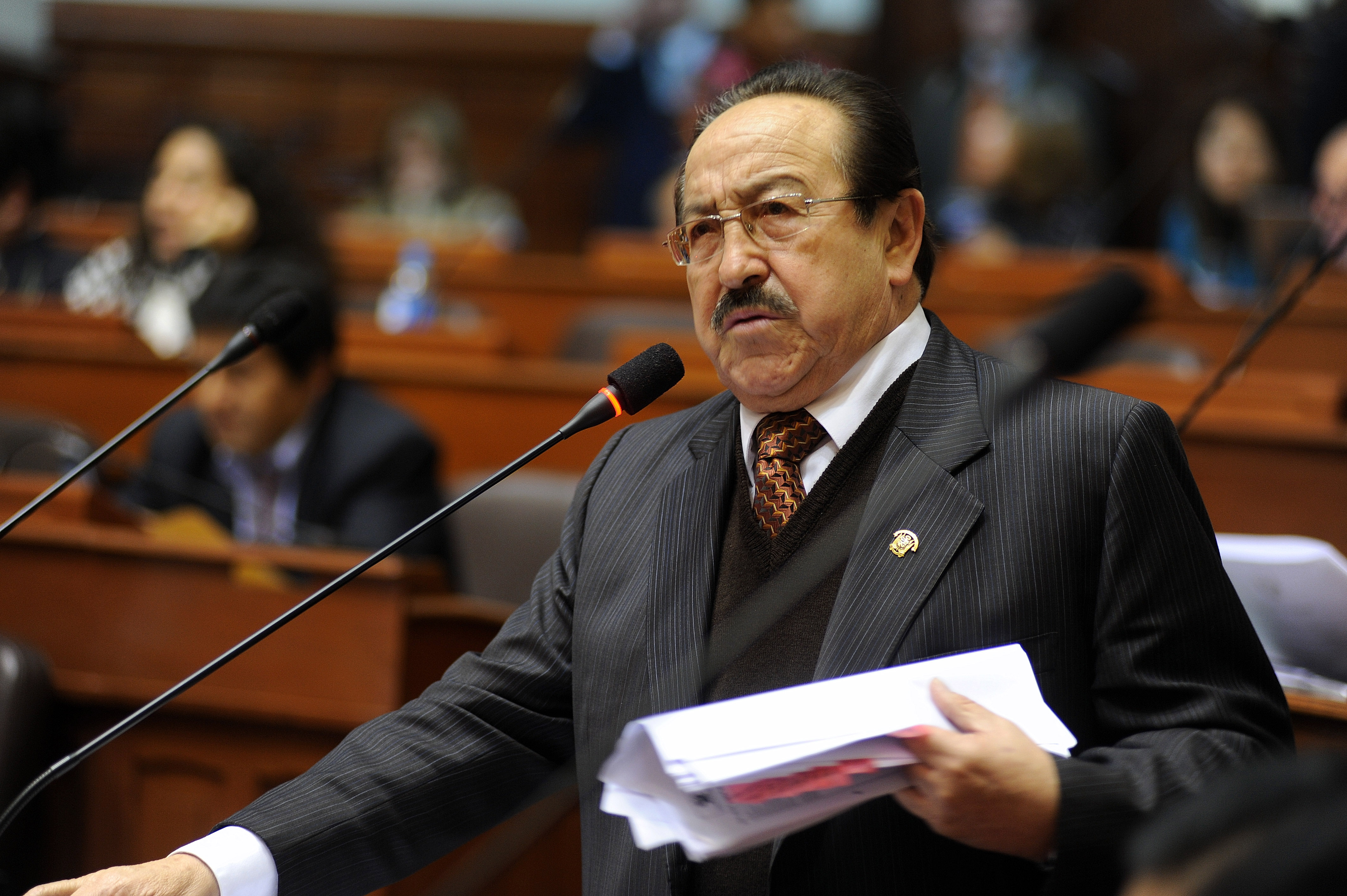

Peruvian Supplementary Representative to the Andean Parliament
- In office 26 July 2011 – 26 July 2016

Member of Congress
- In office 26 July 2006 – 26 July 2011
- Constituency: Cusco

Personal details
- Born: Víctor Ricardo Mayorga Miranda; 3 April 1942 (age 84) Cusco, Peru
- Party: Peruvian Nationalist Party
- Other political affiliations: Peru Wins (2010-2012); Union for Peru (2001–2006)
- Education: National University of Saint Anthony the Abbot in Cuzco
- Occupation: Politician
- Profession: Lawyer

Víctor Ricardo Mayorga Miranda (born 3 April 1942) is a Peruvian lawyer and politician. He was a former Congressman representing the Cusco Region for the 2006–2011 period and was elected under the joint Nationalist-Union for Peru ticket, and belongs to the Peruvian Nationalist Party. Mayorga was a Supplementary Representative to the Andean Parliament between 2011 and 2016, elected under the ticket of the dominated Nationalists-Peru Wins alliance.

== Early life and career ==
He was born in Cusco on April 3, 1942. He attended his primary studies at the Colegio San Francisco de Asís and his secondary studies at the Colegio Ciencias. Between 1960 and 1968, he studied law at the National University of Saint Anthony the Abbot in Cuzco, graduating as a lawyer. During those years, between 1965 and 1968 he was a teacher of secondary education at the Colegio de Las Mercedes teaching Universal History. Between 1978 and 1996 he was a professor at the National University of San Antonio Abad del Cusco. In 1980, he entered the Judiciary as a Labor Judge and then as a member of the Superior Court of Justice of Cusco until 2002.

He participated in the general elections of 2006 and was elected a congressman for the department of Cusco for the Union for Peru-Peruvian Nationalist Party joint ticket. In 2011, he was elected as supplementary representative of Peru in the Andean Parliament until 2016. From 2011 to 2014, he served as Ambassador to Cuba.
