= Fort Chaffee crisis =

19,000 Cuban refugees were detained at Fort Chaffee in 1980

- Part of the Mariel boatlift
- Date: May - June 1980
- Location: Arkansas
- Caused by: Processing problems for Cuban refugees and local anger at Cubans in the area.

Parties
Ku Klux Klan and vigilantes	Law enforcement: Arkansas State Police; US Military	Cuban refugees

Lead figures
	Bill Clinton

The Fort Chaffee crisis occurred during the Mariel boatlift in 1980 when over 19,000 Cuban refugees were detained at Fort Chaffee in Arkansas. They could not be released into the public because they were not United States citizens. After a promise of quick release, many processing setbacks occurred and many refugees remained still detained at the center. Frustrated with the conditions at the facility and the slow processing, many refugees rioted. 62 refugees were injured, some by gunfire, and 46 others were arrested. Refugees at the center would go on to refer to the riot as El Domingo. After the riots, Governor Bill Clinton put heavy fortifications at the center. Clinton would later lose the 1980 Arkansas gubernatorial election after his opponent used the incident against him.

== Background ==
=== Refugees enter Fort Chaffee ===
President Jimmy Carter had recently accepted Cuban refugees from the Mariel boatlift to enter the United States. The Fort Chaffee Maneuver Training Center had previously been used as a detention center for Vietnamese refugees and Carter negotiated with Arkansas governor Bill Clinton for the use of the center to process Cuban refugees. At first Clinton feared the plan, and instead requested that they be processed on an aircraft carrier. He would also argue "We still have a base at Guantanamo, don't we? And there must be a gate in the fence that divides it from Cuba. Take them to Guantanamo, open the door, and march them back into Cuba." President Carter would still order the use of the base and Cuban refugees began to be transported to the center.

In May 1980 around 19,000 Cuban refugees from the Mariel boatlift were airlifted to the Fort Chaffee Maneuver Training Center for immigration processing. The first 128 Cubans brought to the base by plane were met by a trespassing klansman on the tarmac who warned officials to not let them in, claiming they were criminals. By May 20 around 20,000 Cubans were being held at the base.

=== Complications in processing ===
Despite wishes to gain freedom in America, many of the refugees were held for months at the base. Refugees were not allowed to leave the base unless they had a sponsor; it became incredibly hard for refugees to find sponsors due to the branding of Mariel refugees as criminals. Locals and members of the Ku Klux Klan also demonstrated against the Cuban refugees outside of the base, angering the refugees inside.

== Conflict ==
=== Escape and standoff ===
On May 26 hundreds of refugees escaped the base through an unguarded gate. The refugees couldn't be captured since they were technically not illegal aliens. Clinton would later recall "I was afraid people in the area were going to start shooting them. There had been a run on handguns and rifles in every gun store within fifty miles of Chaffee." As the group of refugees walked to Barling armed citizens, some on horseback, faced down the escapees to stop their movement. The police intervened to stop violence and asked for a Spanish speaking interpreter. Eduardo Gamarra a Bolivian born refugee re-locator official was brought in to interpret. Gamarra pleaded the refugees sit down to talk, warning the residents might open fire. The refugees talked of their frustrations in not finding sponsors so they could leave the base and Gamarra reassured them he would help to find sponsors, the refugees decided to return to the base. As the refugees returned to the base's fence the angered citizens charged the refugees pushing some over the fence and forcing them back into the base.

Later that night Ku Klux Klan members carrying torches marched by the base with signs saying "Kill the Communist Criminals" while local armed vigilantes circled the base with pickup trucks. Gamarra would recall that later that night the local news would refer to the standoff as a sit-in protest staged by the refugees.

=== Riots ===
==== June 1 ====
On June 1 a group of refugees began marching and chanting "Libertad!" and walked out of the center. When state police began to beat the escapees the refugees began to hurl rocks at them. After police were pinned behind trucks the police began to open fire with pistols and shotguns at the escapees. The escapees were forced back into the base and were then tear gassed and clubbed by federal police and soldiers. Bands of refugees began roaming around the base starting fires, various barracks were burned. Some Cubans helped authorities put out fires and calm rioters. Many rioters were later arrested, and many civilians were evacuated from the base.

==== June 2 ====
On June 2 a group of refugees began chanting "Libertad" and marching towards the gate. A conflict arose between the marchers and a television crew and the crew had to flee to a nearby building. As the marchers began climbing the base fences, state troopers and deputies from Fort Smith and Sebastian county began to corral marchers back into the base and began firing warning shots. The marchers retreated back inside the base and began hurling rocks at law enforcement. Police officers began clubbing a refugee who escaped the conflict and was running from the base. In the town of Barling soldiers and police were holding back armed locals who demanded to battle the Cuban rioters, six locals would be arrested for disorderly conduct.

== Aftermath ==
The conflict left one Cuban dead, 40 injured, 84 jailed, while one civilian and 15 state troopers were also injured.

=== Political losses ===
Political challenger of Bill Clinton for the governorship Frank White, used the crisis against Clinton in his campaign and would eventually win the election.

=== Immigration fears ===
After the May 26th standoff People magazine quoted an INS officer claiming that, "85 percent of the refugees are convicts, robbers, murderers, homosexuals, and prostitutes." This figure was a gross overestimate, but stoked popular fears. Former Carter administration official Gene Eidenberg stated on the media's role in the incident: "I was in Chicago in 1968. What happened at Ft. Chaffee was a disturbance but it became a riot in the public mind. The national media defined the character of 127,000 Cubans… people wandered off the base on a hot summer night to stretch their legs, they were scared, nervous, bored, but not about to take on the U.S. Army." Mayor Jack Freeze of neighboring community Fort Smith noted of the incident "People here decided they didn't want the Cubans before they saw them. The press had already said they were bad. I knew they couldn't be productive. There might be a Desi Arnaz or two out there, but mostly they were going to be killing one another."

== See also ==
- 1980 Miami riots
