= Blanche Zacharie de Baralt =

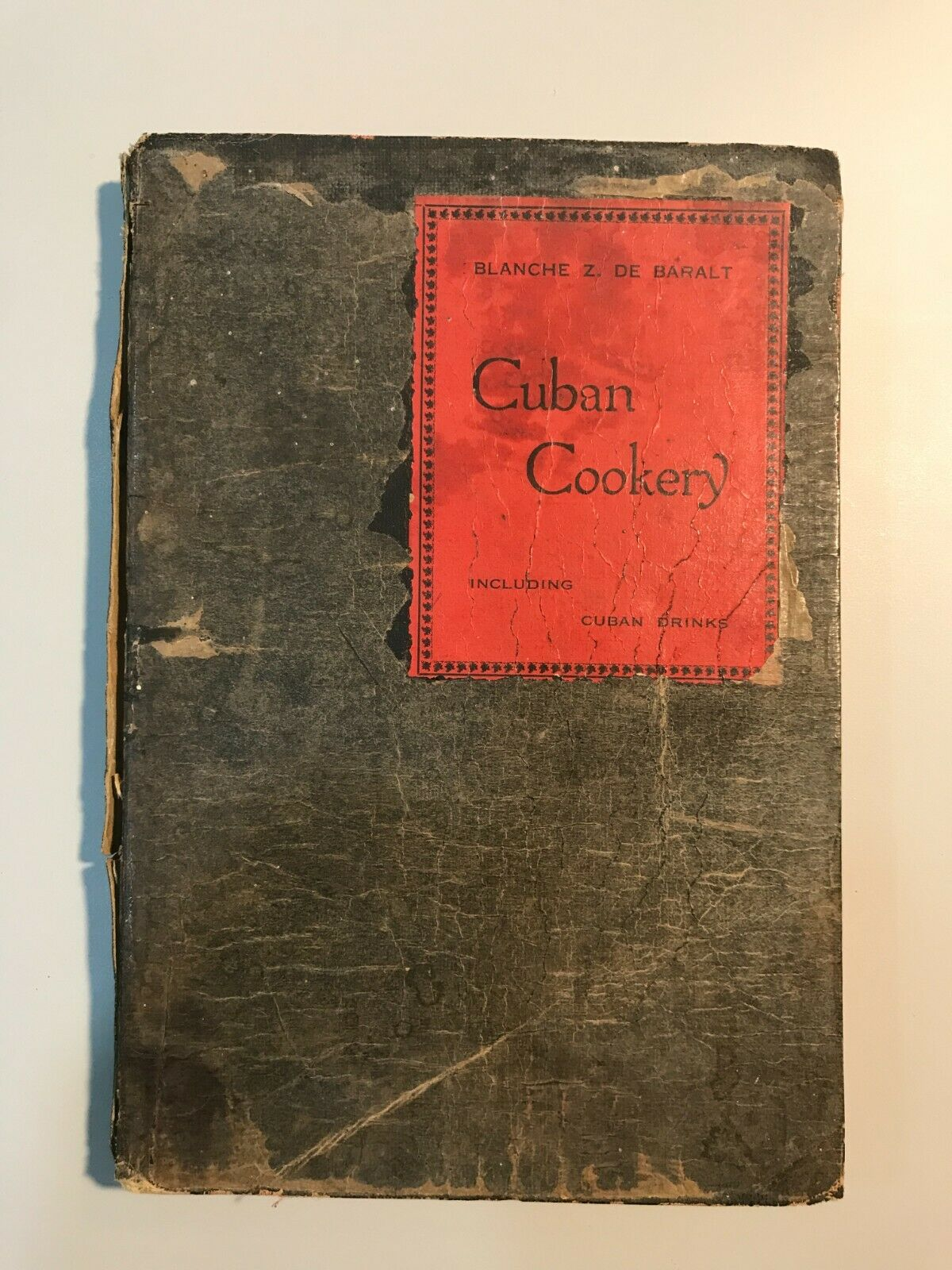
Cuban Cookery (1931) by Blanche Zacharie de Baralt

Jane Blanche Zacharie Hutchings de Baralt (1865/66–1950) was an American-Cuban lecturer, writer and translator. She was the first woman to receive a degree in philosophy from the University of Havana and the first person to translate Rabindranath Tagore into Spanish. In a 1931 cookbook, she provided an early recipe for the mojito cocktail.

== Life ==
Jane Blanche Zacharie Hutchings was born in New York. Most sources give her year of birth as 1865, but according to one source she was born on September 17, 1866. Her father was a perfumier of Polish ancestry, and her mother was from New Jersey. She was sent to France for her primary education before continuing study in the United States.

On 15 December 1886 she married Luis Alejandro Baralt y Peoli, a Cuban physician, journalist, diplomat and linguist in New York. They lived in New York, until moving to Havana in 1900. In 1902 she became the first women to be awarded a philosophy PhD from the University of Havana.

In 1913 she read Tagore's poetry collection Gitanjali. On August 6, 1913, she published a review, along with some of Tagore's poems translated into Spanish, in the Cuban newspaper El Diario de la Marina. This is said to be the first Spanish translation of his poetry.

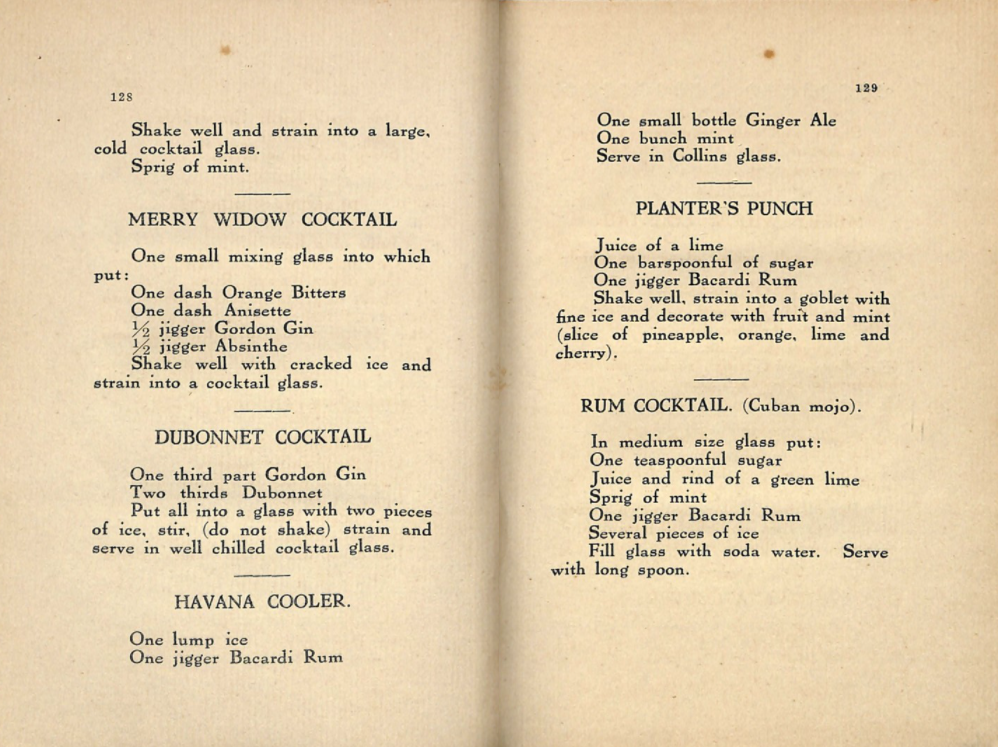
Page 129 of Cuban Cookery (1931), by Blanche Zacharie de Baralt, showing a recipe for a rum cocktail (Cuban mojo)

Baralt published her cookbook, Cuban Cookery, in 1931. It was the first English-language guide to Cuban cuisine, illustrated by the Cuban artists Conrado W. Massaguer and Federico Edelmann. Clearly directed at an international readership, the book emphasized European origins of Cuban food. Baralt argued that "the cuisine of a country is one of its psychological aspects, an accumulation of slow growth, almost a synthesis of its civilization". An appendix on Cuban drinks included a recipe for a mojito cocktail, which she called a "rum cocktail (Cuban mojo)".

In 1945 she published a book about the Cuban national hero José Martí.

The playwright Luis Alejandro Baralt Zacharie was her son.

== Works ==
- Estudios de arte y de vida [Studies in art and life]. París: P. Ollendorff, [1914].
- Cuban cookery: gastronomic secrets of the Tropics, with an appendix on Cuban drinks. Havana: Hermes, 1931.
- El Martí quo yo conocí [The El Martí I knew]. La Habana: Editorial Trópico, 1945.
