= Luis Alejandro Baralt Zacharie =

Luis Alejandro Baralt y Zacharie (1892–1969) was a Cuban playwright.

== Biography ==
Baralt was born in New York on April 12, 1892. He was the youngest of three children of Luis Alejandro Baralt y Peoli (1849–1933), a professor of Spanish, journalist, doctor and diplomat, and Blanche Zacharie Hutchings (1865–1950), the first woman to receive a degree in philosophy from the University of Havana.

Baralt gained a PhD in Philosophy and Letters from the University of Havana in 1914, and a Masters from Harvard University in 1916. From 1918 to 1924 he was professor of English at the Havana Institute of Secondary Education.

In 1932-33 he was Professor of Latin American Culture at the University of Miami. In 1934 he became Professor of Philosophy and Aesthetics at the University of Havana. He was the director of Teatro la Cueva, an experimental Havana theater which he founded in 1936. On 6 November 1936 La luna y el pantano opened, written and directed by Baralt. The cast included the student leader Teté Casuso.

Following the Cuban Revolution, in 1960, Baralt left Cuba for exile in the United States. He died in September 1969.

== Works ==
- (tr. and ed.) Martí on the U.S.A. by José Martí. Carbondale: Southern Illinois University Press, 1966.
