= Embassy of Peru, Havana =

Peruvian diplomatic mission in Cuba

Embassy of Peru in Havana
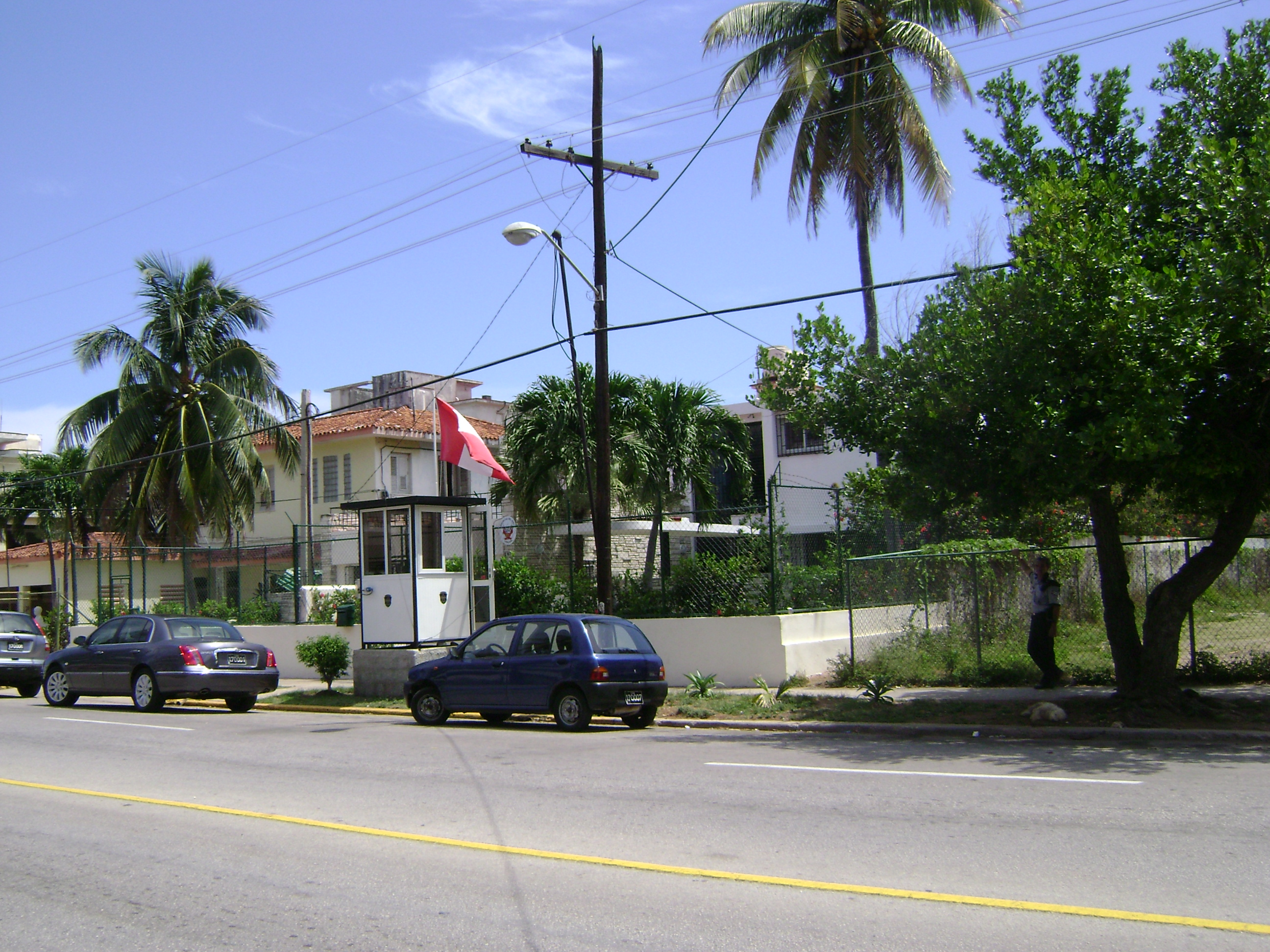
- Location: Havana, Cuba
- Ambassador: Gonzalo F. Guillén Beker
- Website: Official website

The embassy of Peru in Cuba (Spanish: Embajada del Perú en Cuba) represents the permanent diplomatic mission of the South American country in Cuba.

The current Peruvian ambassador to Cuba is Gonzalo Flavio Guillén Beker.

== History ==
Peru and Cuba established relations in 1902. After the Cuban Revolution, relations continued, but their troubled nature led to Peru to sever diplomatic relationships on December 30, 1960, leading to the closure of the Peruvian embassy. After the establishment of Juan Velasco Alvarado's Revolutionary Government, Peru reestablished its relations with Cuba on 8 July 1972, which have remained since.

=== 1980 crisis ===
On early 1980, a small group of Cuban citizens made their way into the embassy, instigating an international crisis over the diplomatic status of around 10,000 asylum-seeking Cubans who joined them over the following days after the Cuban government ceased its protection of the embassy.

In the aftermath of the event, the embassy—then located on the 5th Avenue of Miramar—closed and became the Militant People's March Historic Museum (Spanish: Museo de la Marcha del Pueblo Combatiente) until 1988, when the expo was moved to the Municipal Museum at Marianao. After a period of abandonment, the former embassy was demolished in the summer of 1999, becoming the parking lot area for a tourist hotel opened as the Novotel, and later known as the Occidental Miramar, and ultimately as the Memories Miramar.

== See also ==
- Cuba–Peru relations
- List of ambassadors of Peru to Cuba
