= Peru–Slovakia relations =

- Peru: Slovakia

Peru–Slovakia relations are the bilateral relations between the Republic of Peru and the Slovak Republic. Both countries are members of the United Nations and of the Pacific Alliance, where Slovakia is an observer state.

== History ==
Peru formally established relations with Slovakia's predecessor states: first the Austro-Hungarian Empire, and then Czechoslovakia. After the German occupation of Czechoslovakia—now the Protectorate of Bohemia and Moravia—Peru ceased to recognize Czechoslovakia as a sovereign state. However, as World War II progressed, Peru maintained relations with the Czechoslovak government-in-exile, among others, now based in London.

After the dissolution of Czechoslovakia in 1993, relations were continued with both states, with the newly established Czech Republic continuing to inhabit the chancery of the former Czechoslovak embassy, and the Slovak Republic inheriting the commercial office building in Angamos Avenue, which became the Slovak embassy until its closure in 2003.

In December 1996, both countries were involved in a diplomatic incident, as the Slovak chargé d'affaires, Július Grančák, became one of many hostages held by the Túpac Amaru Revolutionary Movement in the Japanese embassy hostage crisis. He was ultimately released on December 27.

Both countries have moved to improve their relations, with a cooperation agreement being signed in 2015 by Slovak Minister Ľubomír Rehák.

== High-level visits ==
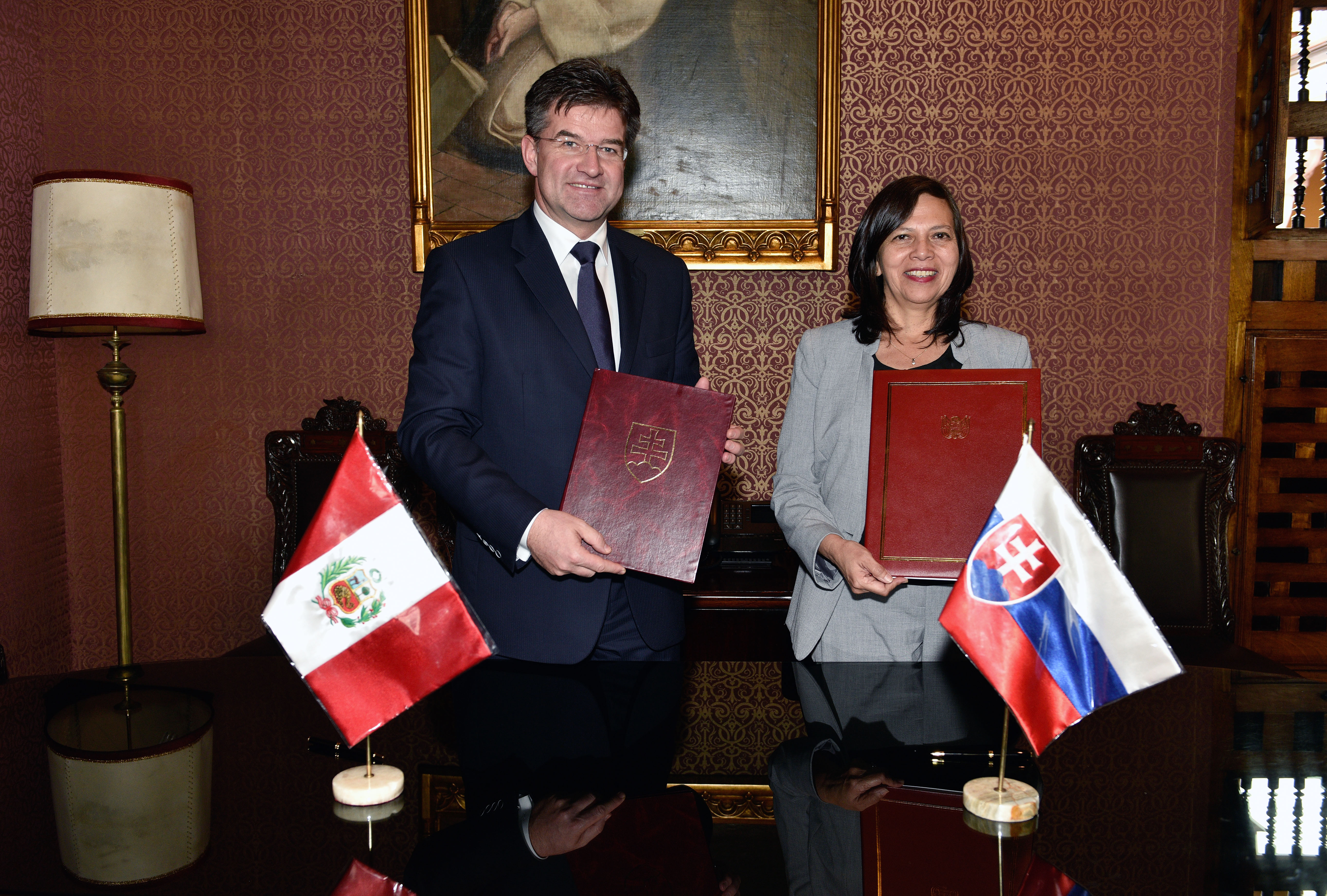
Miroslav Lajčák with Ana María Sánchez during his visit in 2015.

High-level visits of Slovakia to Peru

- Vice Minister Tatiana Silhankova
- Minister Ján Kubiš (2008)
- Minister Ľubomír Rehák (2015)
- Minister Miroslav Lajčák (2015)

High-level visits of Peru to Slovakia

- Vice Minister Ignacio Higueras Hare (2023)

== Trade ==
In 2012, a Free Trade Agreement with the European Union, of which Slovakia is a part of, was signed with Colombia in Brussels, Belgium. It entered into force in Peru on March 1, 2013. In 2021, Peruvian exports to Slovakia were valued at US$ 25.9 million, while Slovak exports were valued at US$26.5 million.

== Diplomatic missions ==
- Peru is accredited to Slovakia from its embassy in Vienna, Austria and also has an honorary consulate in Bratislava.
- Slovakia is accredited to Peru from its embassy in Buenos Aires, Argentina and also has an honorary consulate in Lima.

== See also ==
- Foreign relations of Peru
- Foreign relations of Slovakia
- Czech Republic–Peru relations
- List of ambassadors of Peru to Slovakia
- List of ambassadors of Slovakia to Peru
