= Steve Dudeney =

British firefighter

Stephen Dudeney (born July 1968) is a retired British firefighter. He was a senior officer in the London Fire Brigade.

== Early life ==
He was born in Kensington, West London and adopted at 6 weeks old and raised in Stepney & Poplar in London's East End. As a youngster he used to spend a lot of time at his local Fire Station in Poplar and held a desire to become a Firefighter when he was older.

== Career ==
In 1987, aged 18, he joined the London Fire Brigade, and after his initial training, was posted to Bethnal Green fire station. He spent most of his career at fire stations in the East End (Bethnal Green, Poplar, Shadwell, Plaistow, Bow) rising up the ranks to Station Officer in 2000. In 2002 he became Station Commander at Poplar fire station (near his childhood home) the station where he served in every rank. He was also Station Commander at Homerton fire station in Hackney, Wennington fire station in Havering and was the First Station Commander at the new fire station in Harold Hill in Havering which (2009) was the first newly established fire station in London for 13 years. In April 2010 he was promoted to Group Manager and became head of the LFB Leadership and Management Development Team. In April 2012 he transferred to LFB's Special Operations Group.

On 1 August 2013 he was appointed to the role of LFB Borough Commander for the London Borough of Hackney. Responsible for 200 staff at the four fire Stations in the Borough; Homerton, Kingsland (closed in 2014), Shoreditch & Stoke Newington. In November 2017, he became Borough Commander for the London Borough of Tower Hamlets in Command of the five fire stations in the Borough; Bethnal Green, Millwall, Poplar, Shadwell & Whitechapel. Covering the area where he grew up and started his Fire Service career.

Throughout his career, he attended many incidents across London using his experience at East London fire stations to gain an understanding of firefighting tactics which allowed him to mentor & train younger Firefighters and Junior Officers. When he retired in July 2018, he was one of LFB's most experienced and respected Command Officers. Notable incidents he attended include the 1996 Canary Wharf bomb, the 2005 Buncefiled Oil terminal fire (Hertfordshire), the 2011 Swinley Forest fire (Surrey), the 2011 London riots, the Terrorist attacks at Parliament Square in March 2017 and London Bridge in June 2017 as well as the Grenfell Tower fire in June 2017.

== London Firefighter Book ==
In August 2022, Steve's first book, "London Firefighter". 6 August 2022. was published. The book is a memoire of his career in London Fire Brigade from 1987 until he retired in 2018. The book documents his career where he attended some of the most significant incidents to befall London in recent decades.

== Writing and Media ==
Steve is a regular contributor to a number of International Fire Service publications and was the editor of the British Fire Service Association magazine 'The Journal'. He is best for his contribution to Fire Service articles relating to Fire Service Command, Fire Service Tactics especially around Firefighting in high rise buildings. He is also part of the Management team for the popular UK Firefighting website www.fireservice.co.uk He has been a contributing Author to 3-D Firefighting and Eurofighter He is also a frequent media commentator on Fire Service related issues on UK TV and Radio.

== Television ==
In 2017 Steve Dudeney featured in two Fire Service TV programmes. Timeshift Blazes and Brigades was a BBC4 programme looking at almost two centuries of Firefighting history in the UK where he spoke about the changes over the past thirty years of UK Firefighting (1987 to 2017). He also featured in two episodes of the ITV television documentary Inside London Fire Brigade. Telling of his experiences at the Grenfell Tower Fire (episode 1) and Film crews followed him on his day-to-day duties as a Borough Commander (episode 2).

== 9/11 FDNY links ==
Steve along with three colleagues from Poplar Fire Station were among the first British Firefighters to fly to New York in the days following the attacks on the Twin Towers. The group visited many Stations as well as Ground Zero and became pivotal in the fundraising for the families of the New York Firefighters from within the UK Fire Service in the months after the attack. It was US Firefighters raising funds for British Firefighters in World War Two which saw the establishment of the Fire Services National Benevolent Fund (now Firefighters Charity. In 2003 article 'Completing the Circle' in Firehouse Magazine Dudeney explains the story of the WW2 Firefighters and how modern day counterparts repaid the favour to US Firefighters after 9/11. He was involved in the 60th Anniversary celebrations of the FSNBF in 2003 where he accompanied a group of New York Firefighters to the celebration at the Royal Albert Hall.

== Awards ==
In 1991 as a Temporary Leading Firefighter Steve was awarded a Chief Fire Officers letter of Congratulations along with Liam Hackett and two others following the rescue of a man from a live electricity pylon in Leytonstone East London on 23 December 1989. "The London Fire Brigade's highest gallantry award was a Chief Officer's Commendation, next came a Chief Officer's Letter of Congratulations.In either case an individual had demonstrated exceptional courage and bravery working in a hostile and dangerous environment........."

In 2014 he was admitted into Worshipful Company of Firefighters and granted The Freedom of the City of London.

Ribbon	Description	Notes
	Queen Elizabeth II Golden Jubilee Medal	2002; UK Version of this Medal
	Queen Elizabeth II Diamond Jubilee Medal	2012; UK Version of this Medal
	Fire Brigade Long Service and Good Conduct Medal	July 2007
