= List of ambassadors of the Czech Republic to Peru =

Ambassador of the Czech Republic to Peru
- Coat of arms of Czechia
- Incumbent; Josef Hlobil since 2022
- Inaugural holder: František Kadeřábek
- Formation: 1937

The Czech ambassador in Lima is the official representative of the Government in Prague to the Government of Peru. The ambassador in Lima is also accredited to Bolivia.

Czechoslovakia first established relations with Peru on July 11, 1922. In 1937, the diplomatic representation between both countries was raised to the level of Embassy, with the Czechoslovak government opening an embassy in Lima the same year.

After the German occupation of Czechoslovakia—now the Protectorate of Bohemia and Moravia—Peru ceased to recognize Czechoslovakia as a sovereign state. However, as World War II progressed, Peru maintained relations with the Czechoslovak government-in-exile, among others, now based in London.

After the war, both countries reestablished relations, which continued into the Czechoslovak Socialist Republic until October 4, 1957, when Peru, under Manuel A. Odría's government, broke relations with the state. After the 1968 Peruvian coup d'état and the establishment of Juan Velasco Alvarado's Revolutionary Government, relations were renewed in 1968 and raised to the level of embassy in 1969.

Relations again continued into the Czech and Slovak Federative Republic, and after the country ceased to exist in 1993, the Peruvian government recognized the Czech Republic and Slovakia as its successor states.

== List of representatives ==
=== Czechoslovakia (1922–1993) ===
Diplomatic agrément	Diplomatic accreditation	Ambassador	Notes	President of Czechoslovakia	President of Peru	Term end
	June 8, 1936	Jaroslav Netoušek	As chargé d'affaires.	Edvard Beneš	Óscar R. Benavides	1937
	April 6, 1937	František Kadeřábek	As ambassador.	Edvard Beneš	Óscar R. Benavides	1937
	July 2, 1937	Augustin Lafar	As chargé d'affaires.	Edvard Beneš	Óscar R. Benavides	1938
Represented by Germany (Czechoslovakia incorporated into Germany in 1938, diplomatic relations resumed in 1943)
	October 9, 1942	Vladimír Polodna	As chargé d'affaires.	Edvard Beneš (E)	Manuel Prado	1943
	November 3, 1943	Vladimír Smetana	As ambassador.	Edvard Beneš (E)	Manuel Prado	1946
	May 23, 1946	Václav Kresta	As ambassador.	Edvard Beneš	José Luis Bustamante y Rivero	1947
	October 21, 1947	Eduard Kühnl	As chargé d'affaires.	Edvard Beneš	José Luis Bustamante y Rivero	March 1948
Relations renewed to embassy level in 1968; embassy opened in Lima
December 1968	March 1969	Věroslav Vágner	As chargé d'affaires.	Alexander Dubček	Juan Velasco Alvarado	1971
	1971	Josef Mejstřík	As ambassador.	Gustáv Husák	Juan Velasco Alvarado	December 1974
	November 1989	Marian Masarik	Also accredited to Bolivia.	Gustáv Husák	Alan García	1990

=== Czech Republic (1993–present) ===
Diplomatic agrément	Diplomatic accreditation	Ambassador	Notes	President of the Czech Republic	President of Peru	Term end
	1992	Milan Řádek	As (final) Chargé d'affaires (a.i.) of Czechoslovakia, his post continued after the dissolution of the country. He was thus the first representative to Peru.	Václav Havel	Alberto Fujimori	1994
	1994	Ľubomír Hladík	As Chargé d'affaires (a.i). He was one of the hostages during the Japanese embassy hostage crisis.	Václav Havel	Alberto Fujimori	1999
	October 18, 2000	Jan Kopecký	During his tenure, a Czech-Peruvian parliamentary league was inaugurated.	Václav Havel	Alberto Fujimori	
March 17, 2006	June 1, 2006	Véra Zemanová	Her agrément for Bolivia was granted on May 18, 2006.	Václav Klaus	Alejandro Toledo	2010
	February 2, 2011	Vladimir Eisenbruk		Václav Klaus	Alan García	2015
	September 25, 2015	Pavel Bechný		Miloš Zeman	Ollanta Humala	September 2019
	October 25, 2019	Michal Sedláček		Miloš Zeman	Martín Vizcarra	2022
	July 21, 2022	Josef Hlobil		Miloš Zeman	Pedro Castillo	Incumbent

== See also ==
- Czech Republic–Peru relations
- List of ambassadors of Peru to the Czech Republic
- List of ambassadors of Slovakia to Peru
