= Liam Hackett (firefighter) =

British firefighter

William (Liam) Alfred Hackett CStJ
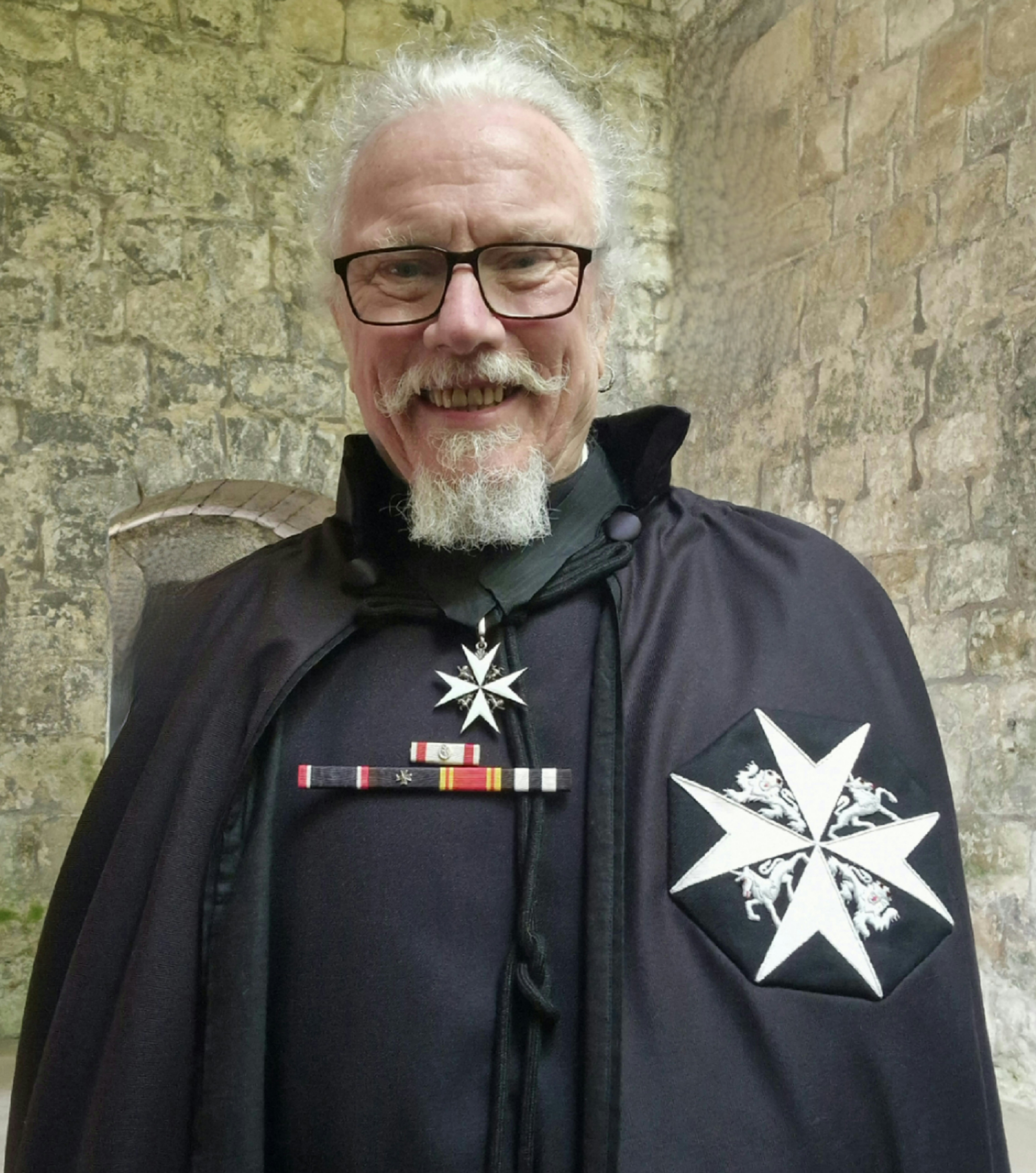

Assistant Division Officer London Fire Brigade
- In office 1969–1991

Personal details
- Occupation: Retired firefighter
- Awards: St John Life Saving Medal (1991) Commander of the Order of Saint John (2022); Silver Medal Order pro Merito Melitensi (2016) Cross of the Order pro Merito Melitensi (2024)

William (Liam) Alfred Hackett CStJ is a retired British firefighter and recipient of the Life Saving Medal of the Order of St John.

He was awarded the London Fire Brigade's highest gallantry award, The Chief Officers Commendation in 1990 and the Life Saving Medal of the Most Venerable Order of the Hospital of St John of Jerusalem on 6 February 1991 for a rescue he performed on 23 December 1989, whilst serving in the London Fire Brigade. The medal is awarded for saving a life or attempting to while placing themselves in imminent danger.

On 17 September 2010, he was admitted into the Worshipful Company of Firefighters and granted The Freedom of the City of London.

In 2013, he was made a Member of the Most Venerable Order of the Hospital of St John of Jerusalem making him the first person in Scotland to be both a member of the Order of Saint John and a recipient of the Live Saving Medal. In 2018, he was promoted to Officer of the Order of Saint John. In January 2022, he was once again promoted but this time to the rank of Commander.

For his voluntary work with the Companions of the Sovereign Military Order of Malta in Glasgow. Scotland, he was invested into the Order pro Merito Melitensi, in the grade of Silver Medal, on the feast of St John, held in the Brompton Oratory Church in London on 24 June 2016. In 2024, in recognition of continued service, he was awarded the Cross of the Order pro Merito Melitensi.

== Honours ==
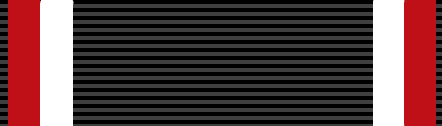

Ribbon	Description	Notes
	Order of St. John (CStJ)	Commander; 2022
	Order of St John Life Saving Medal	1991
	Fire Brigade Long Service and Good Conduct Medal	1989
	Cross pro Merito Melitensi	2024
	Bronze medal pro Merito Melitensi	2016
