= Freedom of the City of London =

Status necessary to take part in City of London governance institutions and procedures

The Freedom of the City of London started around 1237 as the status of a 'free man' or 'citizen', protected by the charter of the City of London and not under the jurisdiction of a feudal lord. In the Middle Ages, this developed into a freedom or right to trade, becoming closely linked to the medieval guilds, the livery companies. In 1835, eligibility for the freedom of the City was extended to anyone who lived in, worked in or had a strong connection to the City. The freedom that citizens enjoy has long associations with privileges in the governance of the City.

The freedom is awarded by the City of London Corporation. Whilst no longer carrying many substantive rights and largely existing as a tradition, the freedom is a pre-requisite for standing for election to the Common Council and Court of Aldermen of the City of London. The Lord Mayor of the City must first become an alderman, and hence must also be a freeman.

There are multiple routes to gaining the freedom of the City of London.

The original three routes to the freedom, via the livery companies, still exist. An individual can become a freeman of a livery company by servitude (apprenticeship), patrimony (either parent being a member of that livery company at the time of the individual's birth), or redemption (general admission, the criteria varying by livery company). Once a freeman of a livery company, an application can be made to the Chamberlain's Court for admission as a freeman of the City, which requires approval from Common Council. It is necessary to become a freeman of the City to advance to the livery company status of 'liveryman', or to hold an office in a livery company. Liverymen have electoral rights in the City of London in voting for certain offices.

It is also possible to become a freeman of the City by nomination by two common councillors, aldermen or liverymen.

Similarly, due to freedom being a pre-requisite for standing for elected office in the City, it is possible for a prospective candidate to obtain freedom by nomination by any two electors.

Freemen are admitted by the Clerk of the Chamberlain's Court during a ceremony at Guildhall.

== Honorary Freedom ==
Honorary Freedom of the City of London is a recognition of lifetime achievement or high international standing, and is much rarer than the broader freedom of the city.

The granting of the Honorary Freedom of the City of London (or Freedom Honoris Causa) is extremely rare and generally awarded today only to royalty, heads of state, or figures of genuine global standing. It is the greatest honour that is in the power of the City of London to bestow, and usually takes place in Guildhall in the presence of the Common Council and the lord mayor, sheriffs, and aldermen, along with invited guests.

For example, in 2013, after a gap of some eleven years, Anglican Archbishop Desmond Tutu received the Honorary Freedom of the City of London, with the ceremony taking place at Mansion House. In 1996, Nelson Mandela, as President of South Africa, received the same honour. The presentation on such occasions is made by the Chamberlain of the City of London and is often followed by a banquet at Guildhall or Mansion House. Historically, the first personage to be so honoured was William Pitt the Elder in 1757. However, there are also records of the presentation of such in May 1698 to Philemon Philip Carter, son of Nathaniel Carter (goldsmiths) in the "Freedom of the City Admission Papers" 1681–1930. For many years, it was the custom to present the Freedom in specially commissioned and unique gold or silver caskets, the design of which was inspired by the background and the achievements of the individual to which it was presented. More normal today would be to present the honour in the form of a scroll in an inscribed box.

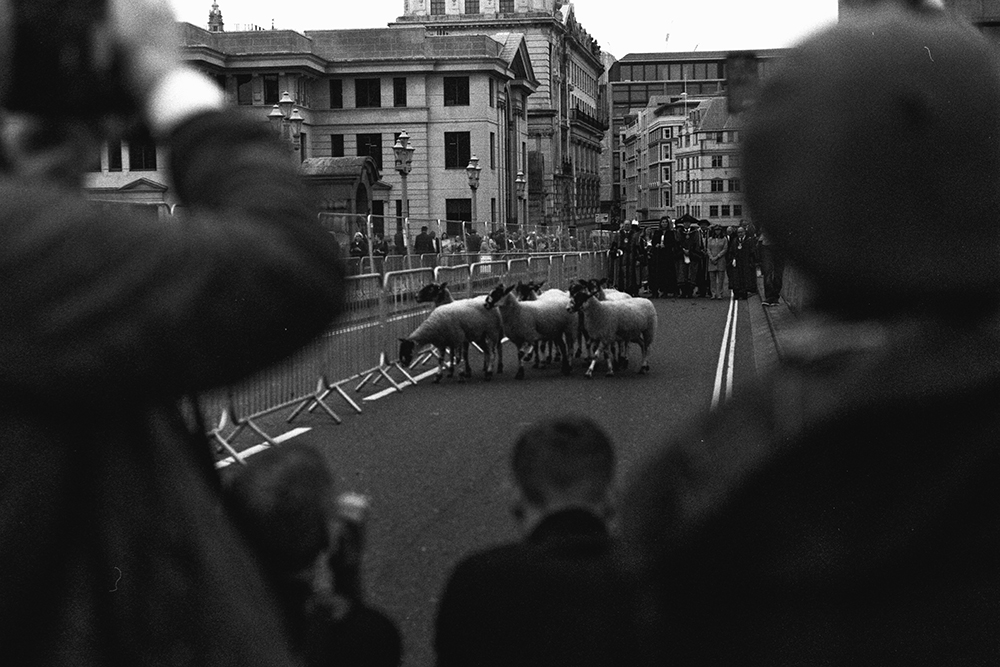
A small number of sheep are herded across Southwark Bridge by the Lord Mayor and Yorkshire Shepherdess among others who are members of the Worshipful Company of Woolmen, bestowed with freedom of the city, London 2021.

== Controversy ==
In March 2026, the City of London Corporation reviewed the option to remove the Freedom of the City from Andrew Mountbatten-Windsor. The review found that the title could not be removed from the former prince because it was a legal right he had acquired by patrimony through his father Prince Philip and thus had not been subject to approval by the Common Council. Mountbatten-Windsor had been installed as a Liveryman of the Worshipful Company of Shipwrights in 2012 and had been styled Grand Master of the Honourable Company of Air Pilots from 2002 until January 2022, when all his royal patronages and military affiliations were returned to the Queen.

In September 2026, the Corporation passed an Act of Common Council to create a process to confer the power to remove the title on itself. Since then the Corporation is urgently considering whether to remove Mountbatten-Windsor's title.

== List of Freemen ==
The mixed list below contains the names of some of the notable people who have received the Freedom or Honorary Freedom over the years. Dates of awards are shown in brackets.

=== Royal Family members ===
- Prince George, Duke of Cambridge (4 November 1857)
- Edward VII (1863)
- Prince Albert Victor, Duke of Clarence and Avondale (29 June 1885)
- Louis Mountbatten, 1st Earl Mountbatten of Burma (1946)
- Elizabeth II (11 June 1947)
- Prince Philip, Duke of Edinburgh (14 June 1948)
- Queen Elizabeth the Queen Mother (1953)
- Princess Margaret, Countess of Snowdon (21 June 1966)
- Charles III (1971)
- Anne, Princess Royal (February 1976)
- Diana, Princess of Wales (22 July 1987)
- Prince Edward, Duke of Edinburgh (2011)
- Andrew Mountbatten-Windsor (2012)

=== Prime ministers of the United Kingdom ===
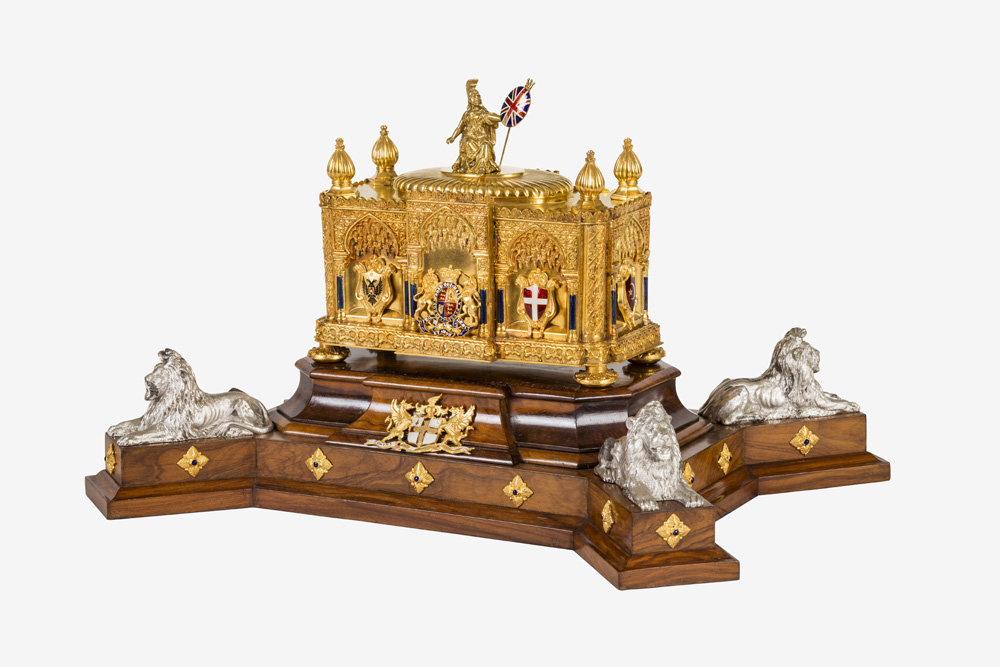
Casket presented to Disraeli, Hughenden collection

- William Pitt the Younger (February 1784)
- Arthur Wellesley, 1st Duke of Wellington (1815)
- Benjamin Disraeli (3 August 1878)
- Robert Gascoyne-Cecil, 3rd Marquess of Salisbury (3 August 1878)
- William Gladstone (October 1881)
- David Lloyd George (27 April 1917)
- Stanley Baldwin
- Winston Churchill (30 June 1943)
- Clement Attlee (26 November 1953)
- Margaret Thatcher (26 May 1989)

=== Victoria Cross and George Cross recipients ===
- William Reid
- Joshua Leakey (5 May 2016)

=== Foreign royalty ===
- Margrethe II of Denmark (2000)
- Otto von Habsburg (11 July 2007)
- Michael I of Romania (2011)
- Kigeli V of Rwanda (28 June 2016)

=== International leaders and principal figures ===
==== Prime Ministers of Canada ====
- Robert Borden (29 July 1915)
- R. B. Bennett (4 November 1930)
- Lester B. Pearson (1967)
- Mark Carney (2014), former governor, Bank of Canada; former governor, Bank of England; 2025 became Prime Minister of Canada

==== Presidents of the United States of America ====
- Ulysses S. Grant (15 June 1877)
- Theodore Roosevelt (31 May 1910)
- Woodrow Wilson (28 December 1918)
- Dwight D. Eisenhower (12 June 1945)

==== Rest of the World ====
- Giuseppe Garibaldi (20 April 1864)
- Louis Botha (16 April 1907)
- Jan Smuts (1 May 1917)
- Jawaharlal Nehru (1956)
- Lee Kuan Yew (15 July 1982)
- Nelson Mandela (10 July 1996)
- Helmut Kohl (18 February 1998, "as the first European leader")
- Bob Hawke (March 1999)
- Marjorie Jackson-Nelson (24 June 2005)
- Lee Hsien Loong (28 March 2014)

=== Entrepreneurs, business leaders, and academics ===
- George Peabody (10 July 1862, in recognition of his financial contribution to London's poor)
- Sir Albert Sassoon (1873)
- Benjamin Henry Blackwell (1920; founder of Blackwell's academic publishing company)
- Patrick Boylan (1991)
- Jimmy Choo (14 November 2006)
- Sir Tim Berners-Lee (24 September 2014)
- George Helon, JP (3 March 2016 and presented on 12 September 2016)
- Stephen Hawking (2017)
- Brady Brim-DeForest (2020)
- John Palmer, 4th Earl of Selborne
- Dame Kate Bingham (2021)
- Julia Hoggett (1 November 2023), CEO of the London Stock Exchange
- André M. Levesque
- James Mwangi (2025; for his contribution to the economic development of Africa)
- Barry Hearn, sports promoter
- Sir Nasser Khalili

=== Archbishops of Canterbury, or of York ===
- Robert Runcie (2 January 1981)

=== Religious leaders ===
- William Booth (26 October 1906)
- Robin Dunster (13 September 2007)
- Cardinal Vincent Nichols (7 September 2011)
- Cardinal Renato Martino (6 May 2013)
- Rabbi Jonathan Sacks (2006)
- Rabbi Alan Plancey (1988)

=== Diplomats ===
- Daniel Mulhall (17 July 2017)
- Arkady Rzegocki, Polish Ambassador (26 February 2020)
- Ľubomír Rehák (2020)
- John Kerry (9 May 2022) United States Secretary of State 2013–2017

=== Entertainment and the arts ===
- Annie Lennox
- Audrey Russell, broadcaster
- Luciano Pavarotti (12 November 2005)
- Dame Barbara Windsor (4 August 2010)
- Simon Russell Beale (10 January 2011)
- J. K. Rowling (8 May 2012)
- Dame Judi Dench
- Sir Michael Caine (8 March 2013)
- Damian Lewis (20 March 2013)
- Plácido Domingo (16 April 2013)
- Bob Geldof (16 September 2013)
- Henry Winkler (9 January 2014)
- Sir Ian McKellen (30 October 2014)
- Morgan Freeman (12 November 2014)
- Stephen Fry
- Eddie Redmayne
- Stephen Sondheim (2018)
- Mark Oliver Everett (July 2019)
- Ronnie Wood (6 April 2021)
- Tommy Steele (19 July 2021)
- Arif Anis (7 April 2022)
- Marco Camisani Calzolari (22 June 2022)
- Ed Sheeran (24 June 2022)
- Cameron Mackintosh (1 June 2023)
- Robert J. Sherman (11 January 2024)
- Simon Armitage (17 April 2025)
- Rachel Riley (22 October 2025)
- Paul Atherton (22 April 2026)
- Andrew Lloyd Webber (7 October 2026)

=== Sports ===
- 2022 EURO England Women's Football Team squad (announced 1 August 2022):
  - Sarina Wiegman (coach, from The Netherlands)
  - Mary Earps
  - Lucy Bronze
  - Rachel Daly
  - Keira Walsh
  - Alex Greenwood
  - Millie Bright
  - Beth Mead
  - Leah Williamson
  - Ellen White
  - Georgia Stanway
  - Lauren Hemp
  - Jess Carter
  - Hannah Hampton
  - Fran Kirby
  - Demi Stokes
  - Jill Scott
  - Nikita Parris
  - Chloe Kelly
  - Bethany England
  - Ella Toone
  - Ellie Roebuck
  - Lotte Wubben-Moy
  - Alessia Russo
- Mark Noble (18 November 2022), West Ham United footballer
- Harry Kane (25 May 2023), England men's football captain
- Ian Wright (1 November 2023), former Crystal Palace, Arsenal and England footballer
- Sir Chris Hoy (26 June 2025), Olympic Gold Medal winning Cyclist.
- Michael Watson (25 September 2025), Boxer

=== Historically notable Britons ===
- Edward Jenner (11 August 1803)
- Sir James Brooke (1847)
- Sir Alexander Cockburn, 12th Baronet (9 March 1876)
- Sir Rowland Hill (1879)
- Frederick Sleigh Roberts, 1st Earl Roberts (1880)
- Beauchamp Seymour, 1st Baron Alcester (1883)
- Anthony Ashley-Cooper, 7th Earl of Shaftesbury (1884)
- Sir Henry Morton Stanley (13 January 1887)
- Sir George Williams (June 1894)
- Herbert Kitchener, 1st Earl Kitchener (4 November 1898)
- Alfred Milner, 1st Viscount Milner (23 July 1901)
- Joseph Chamberlain (13 February 1902)
- Florence Nightingale (16 August 1908).
- Albert Grey, 4th Earl Grey (23 January 1912)
- Douglas Haig, 1st Earl Haig (16 June 1919)
- David Beatty, 1st Earl Beatty (16 June 1919)
- Sir Austen Chamberlain (25 March 1926)
- Sir Neville Leigh
- John Bercow (4 July 2016)
- Captain Sir Tom Moore (12 May 2020)

=== Other notable recipients ===
- Sir Thomas Phillips (voted 26 February 1840, admitted on 7 April 1840)
- Sir James Willcocks (11 July 1901). Freedom of the City of London with sword of honour.
- Frederick Cook (15 October 1909)
- Sir Ernest Marshall Cowell (1953)
- PC Trevor Lock
- Ari Norman (6 November 1992) for services to the British silver industry
- Brian Dear (3 October 2001) for charity work
- Peter Ackroyd (15 December 2006)
- Bob Winter (10 September 2007)
- Shaw Clifton (13 September 2007)
- Lasse Lehtinen (21 September 2007)
- Liam Hackett (15 September 2010)
- Robin Tilbrook (27 September 2011)
- David Weir (3 December 2012)
- Alastair Cook
- Dwayne Fields (2013)
- Crista Cullen (23 August 2013)
- Rob Whiteman (1 May 2014), public servant and CEO of CIPFA
- Adam Ockelford (2021)
- Tom Harwood (14 February 2022)
- Sarah Gilbert (6 October 2023) Oxford project leader for the Oxford–AstraZeneca COVID-19 vaccine
- Bernárd J. Lynch (17 January 2025)

== See also ==
- Burgess of Edinburgh
- Bourgeois of Brussels
- Bourgeois of Paris
- Bourgeoisie of Geneva
