= List of ambassadors of Slovakia to Peru =

Ambassador of Slovakia to Peru
- Coat of Arms of Slovakia
- Incumbent; Rastislav Hindický since 2021
- Seat: Buenos Aires
- Inaugural holder: Pavel Šípka (Chargé d'affaires)
- Formation: 1993

The Slovak ambassador to Peru is the official representative of the Government in Bratislava to the government of Peru. Since 2003, the ambassador to Peru is accredited from Buenos Aires.

Czechoslovakia first established relations with Peru on July 11, 1922. In 1937, the diplomatic representation between both countries was raised to the level of Embassy, with the Czechoslovak government opening an embassy in Lima the same year.

After the German occupation of Czechoslovakia—now the Protectorate of Bohemia and Moravia—Peru ceased to recognize Czechoslovakia as a sovereign state. However, as World War II progressed, Peru maintained relations with the Czechoslovak government-in-exile, among others, now based in London.

After the war, both countries reestablished relations, which continued into the Czechoslovak Socialist Republic until October 4, 1957, when Peru, under Manuel A. Odría's government, broke relations with the state. After the 1968 Peruvian coup d'état and the establishment of Juan Velasco Alvarado's Revolutionary Government, relations were renewed in 1968 and raised to the level of embassy in 1969.

Relations again continued into the Czech and Slovak Federative Republic, and after the country ceased to exist in 1993, the Peruvian government recognized the Czech Republic and Slovakia as its successor states.

== List of representatives ==
Name	Term begin	Term end	President	Notes
1922–1993: Represented by Czechoslovakia (Occupied by Germany in 1938, diplomatic relations resumed in 1945)
Pavel Šípka	January 1, 1993	1996	Michal Kováč	Acting chargé d'affaires. First Slovak representative to Peru.
Július Grančák	May 1996	February 2000	Michal Kováč	Chargé d'affaires; he was one of the hostages during the 1996 Japanese embassy hostage crisis.
Marián Masarik	March 2000	2003	Rudolf Schuster	First and last resident ambassador.
2003: Closure of the Slovak embassy in Lima; ambassador in Buenos Aires becomes accredited
Pavel Šípka	September 18, 2009	2014	Ivan Gašparovič	
Branislav Hitka	January 2015	2019	Andrej Kiska	
Rastislav Hindický	2021	Incumbent	Zuzana Čaputová	

== See also ==
- Peru–Slovakia relations
- List of ambassadors of Peru to Slovakia
- List of ambassadors of the Czech Republic to Peru
