= Alan Plancey =

Jewish Rabbi (1941–2025)

Rabbi Alan Plancey MBE
- Born: 1941; Edinburgh
- Died: June 8, 2025 (aged 83–84); London
- Occupation: Councillor
- Political party: Conservative Party
- Movement: Orthodox Judaism
- Board member of: Hertsmere Borough Council
- Spouse: Miriam Hirsch
- Honours: Member of the Order of the British Empire; Freedom of the City of London

Alan Plancey (1941–2025) was an Orthodox rabbi (who was Rabbi and, later, Emeritus Rabbi) at Borehamwood and Elstree Synagogue. He was also a councillor on Hertsmere Borough Council, representing the Conservative Party. He was appointed to the ceremonial position of Mayor of Hertsmere twice, once in 2019, and again in 2020.

== Honours ==
- Freedom of the City of London (1988)
- Guest at the Royal Wedding (2011)
- Member of the Order of the British Empire (MBE) (2023)
