= Ľubomír Rehák =

Slovak diplomat

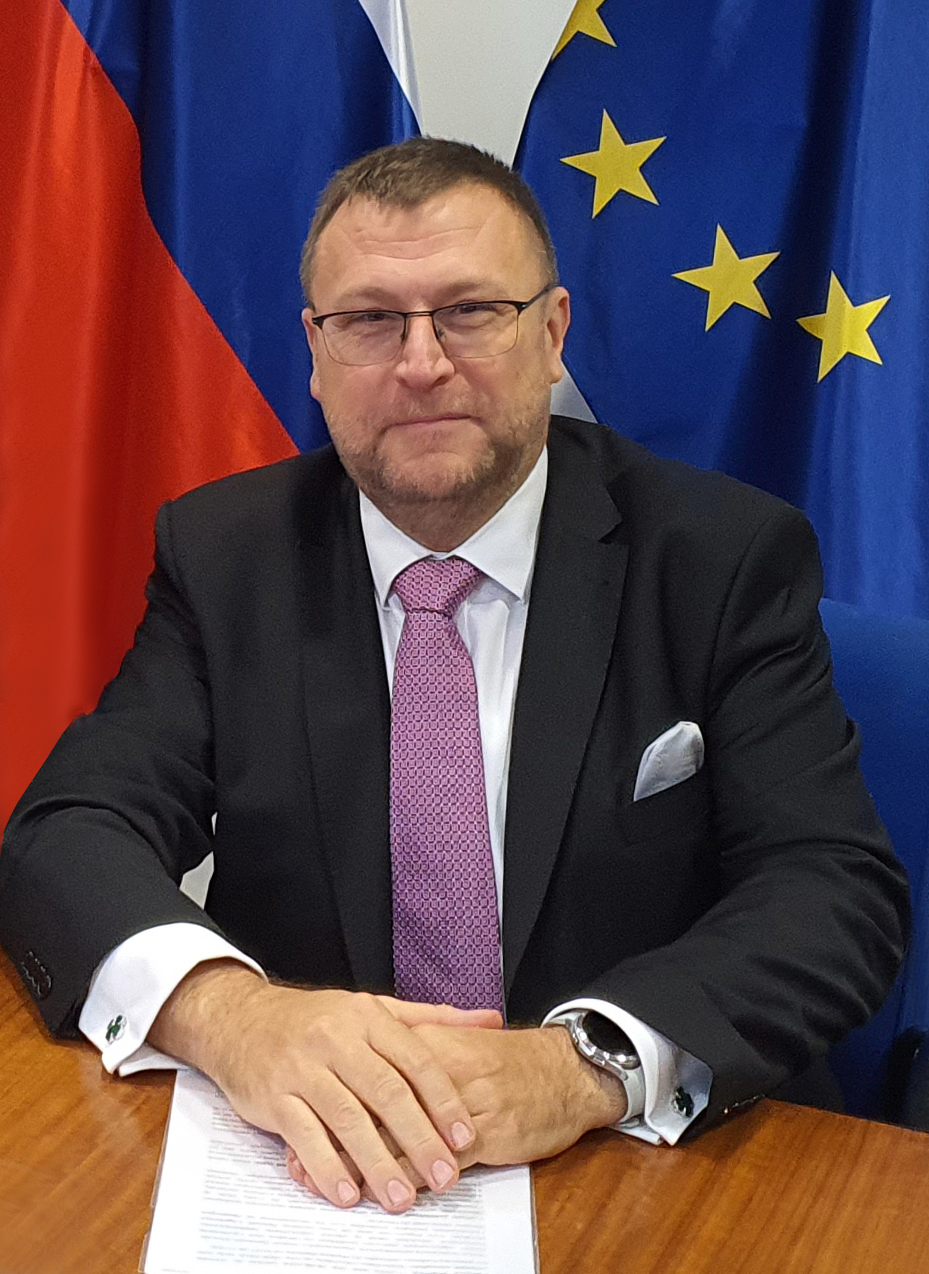

Personal details
- Born: 24 February 1970 (age 56) Topoľčany, Slovakia
- Spouse: Dana Reháková
- Education: Moscow State Institute of International Relations
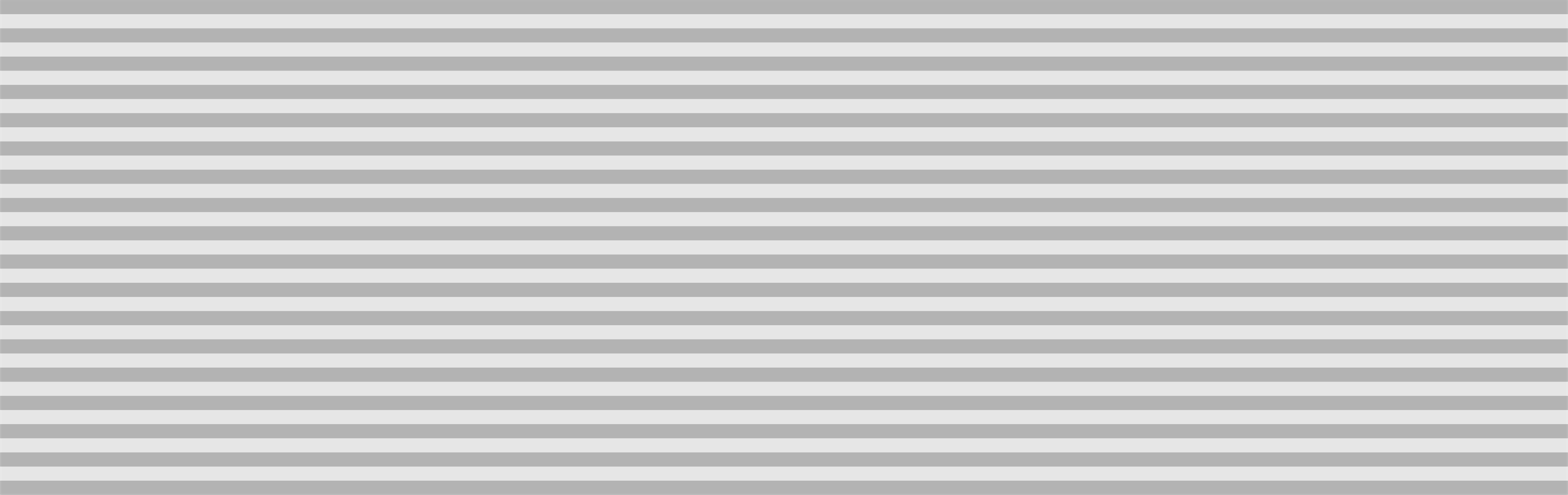
- Awards: Freedom of the City of London

Ľubomír Rehák (born 24 February 1970) is a Slovak diplomat.Since 2024, he has been working in the Department of Analysis and Policy Planning at the Ministry of Foreign and European Affairs of the Slovak Republic in Bratislava (MZVaEZ SR).

== Career ==
Ľubomír Rehák was graduated from the Moscow State Institute of International Relations in 1992 and started his professional career at the MZVaEZ SR. His first 5-year diplomatic posting abroad was in Moscow as the Private Secretary to the Ambassador and Political Officer for Central Asia (1993 –1998). Ľubomír Rehák is also an Honorary Fellow of the London College of Contemporary Arts.

=== Diplomatic activity ===
- 1993 – 1998 Russia, Moscow: Private Secretary to the Ambassador and agenda of Central Asia.
- 1999 – 2003 Portugal, Lisbon: Deputy Ambassador.
- 2004 – 2006 Slovakia, Bratislava: European correspondent, coordinator in the field of the common foreign and security policy of the European Union.
- 2006 – 2008 Belarus, Minsk: Head of the Embassy of the Slovak Republic in Minsk. In the second half of 2007, he also held the position of local presidency of the European Union in Belarus.
- 2008 – 2009 Belgium, Brussels: Ambassador, Representative of the Slovak Republic to the Political and Security Committee of the European Union.
- 2010 – 2011 Slovakia, Bratislava: Director General of the Political Section – Political Director of the Ministry of Foreign Affairs of the Slovak Republic.
- 2011 – 2012 Kazakhstan, Astana: Ambassador Extraordinary and Plenipotentiary to Kazakhstan and Kyrgyzstan.
- 2012 – 2015 Slovakia, Bratislava: Director General of the Political Section – Political Director of the Ministry of Foreign and European Affairs of the Slovak Republic.
- 2015 – 2020 United Kingdom, London: Ambassador Extraordinary and Plenipotentiary of the Slovak Republic to the Court of St. James's in London.
- 2020 – 2024 Russia, Moscow: Ambassador Extraordinary and Plenipotentiary of Slovakia to Russia.
- 2024 – Department of Analysis and Policy Planning at the MZVaEZ SR.

== Honours and awards ==
Coat of Arms of Ľubomír Rehák
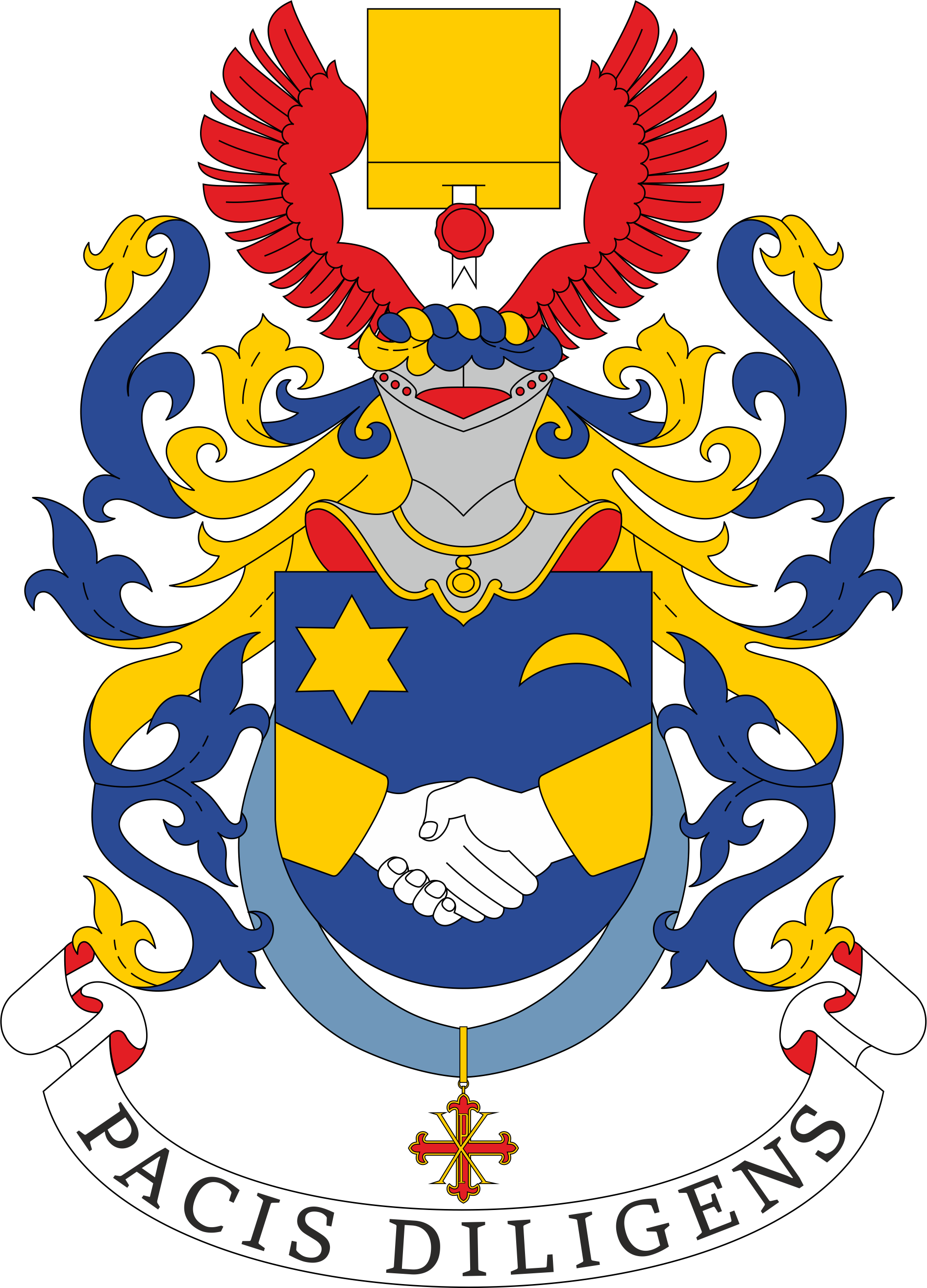
- Armiger: Ľubomír Rehák
- Adopted: 2019
- Crest: A pair of eagle wings Gules encircling a document Or, with a chained seal Gules.
- Shield: Azure, from the sides two growing Argent clothed shaking hands Or raised over the celestial bodies Or - a star on the right, and on the left a half-lying and inverted crescent. Below the torse on a closed tournament helmet a mantling Azure doubled Or.
- Motto: Latin: Pacis Diligens, English: Peace-loving (allusion to Slovak name Ľubomír)
- Order: Knight Commander of Merit with Star of the Sacred Military Constantinian Order of Saint George
- Reg. №: QR-1041/2019, Heraldic Register of the Slovak Republic

=== Foreign honours ===
- United Kingdom: Freedom of the City of London (24 February 2020)

=== Dynastic ===
- Knight Grand Cross of Merit (GOMCO) of the Franco-Neapolitan-Two Sicilian Sacred Military Constantinian Order of Saint George, 23 December 2024. Since 2021, his wife Dana Reháková has also been appointed Dame Commander of Merit.
- Order of Saint Anna of the House of Romanov, 2nd Class, 14 (Julian) / 27 (Gregorian) September 2024.

=== Ecclesiastical awards ===
Orthodox Church of the Czech Lands and Slovakia

- Order of Saint Equal to the Apostles Prince Rastislav of Great Moravia (III grade).
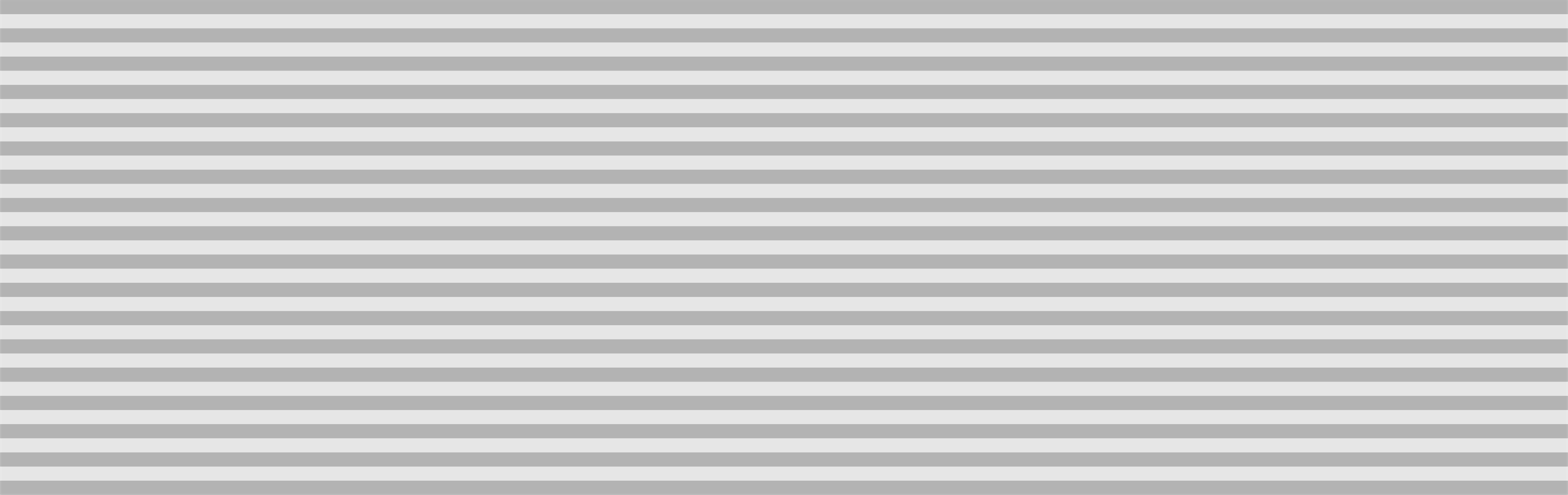
- Medal of Saints Equal-to-Apostles Cyril and Methodius.
