= Czech Republic–Peru relations =

- Czech Republic: Peru

Diplomatic mission
- Embassy of the Czech Republic, Lima: Embassy of Peru, Prague

Czech Republic–Peru relations are the bilateral relations between the Czech Republic and the Republic of Peru. Both countries are members of the United Nations.

== History ==
Peru first established relations with Czechoslovakia on July 11, 1922. In 1937, the diplomatic representation between both countries was raised to the level of Embassy, with the latter opening an embassy in Lima the same year.

After the German occupation of Czechoslovakia—now the Protectorate of Bohemia and Moravia—Peru ceased to recognize Czechoslovakia as a sovereign state. However, as World War II progressed, Peru maintained relations with the Czechoslovak government-in-exile, among others, now based in London.

After the war, both countries reestablished relations, which continued into the Czechoslovak Socialist Republic until October 4, 1957, when Peru, under Manuel A. Odría's government, broke relations with the state. After the 1968 Peruvian coup d'état and the establishment of Juan Velasco Alvarado's Revolutionary Government, relations were renewed in 1968 and raised to the level of embassy in 1969.

In 1996, one of the hostages during the Japanese embassy hostage crisis was Czech chargé d'affaires (a.i.) Ľubomír Hladík.

Relations again continued into the Czech and Slovak Federative Republic, and after the country ceased to exist in 1993, the Peruvian government recognized the Czech Republic and Slovakia as its successor states. As of 2023, Peru maintains an embassy in Prague, and the ambassador in Vienna is accredited to Slovakia.

== High-level visits ==
High-level visits from the Czech Republic to Peru

- Vice Minister Alexandr Vondra (1993)
- Deputy Prime Minister Jan Kalvoda (1994)
- Vice Minister Václav Petříček (1995)
- Vice Minister Martin Palouš (1999)
- Minister Eduard Zeman (2000)
- Minister Jan Fencl (2002)
- Foreign Minister Jan Kavan (2002)
- Prime Minister Vladimír Špidla (2003)
- Prime Minister Mirek Topolánek (2008)
- President Václav Klaus and First Lady Livia Klausová (2009)
- Cardinal Dominik Duka (2012)
- Senator Tomáš Kladívko (2012)
- Defence Minister Martin Stropnický (2013)

High-level visits from Peru to the Czech Republic

- President of Congress Martha Chávez (1997)
- Mayor Alex Kouri (1999)
- Foreign Minister Fernando de Trazegnies (2000)
- Vice President Raúl Diez Canseco (2001)
- INANPE President Hugo de Zela (2004)
- Vice Foreign Minister Harold Forsyth (2006)
- Foreign Minister José Antonio García Belaúnde (2007 & 2009)

== Resident diplomatic missions ==
- The Czech Republic has an embassy in Lima.
- Peru has an embassy in Prague.
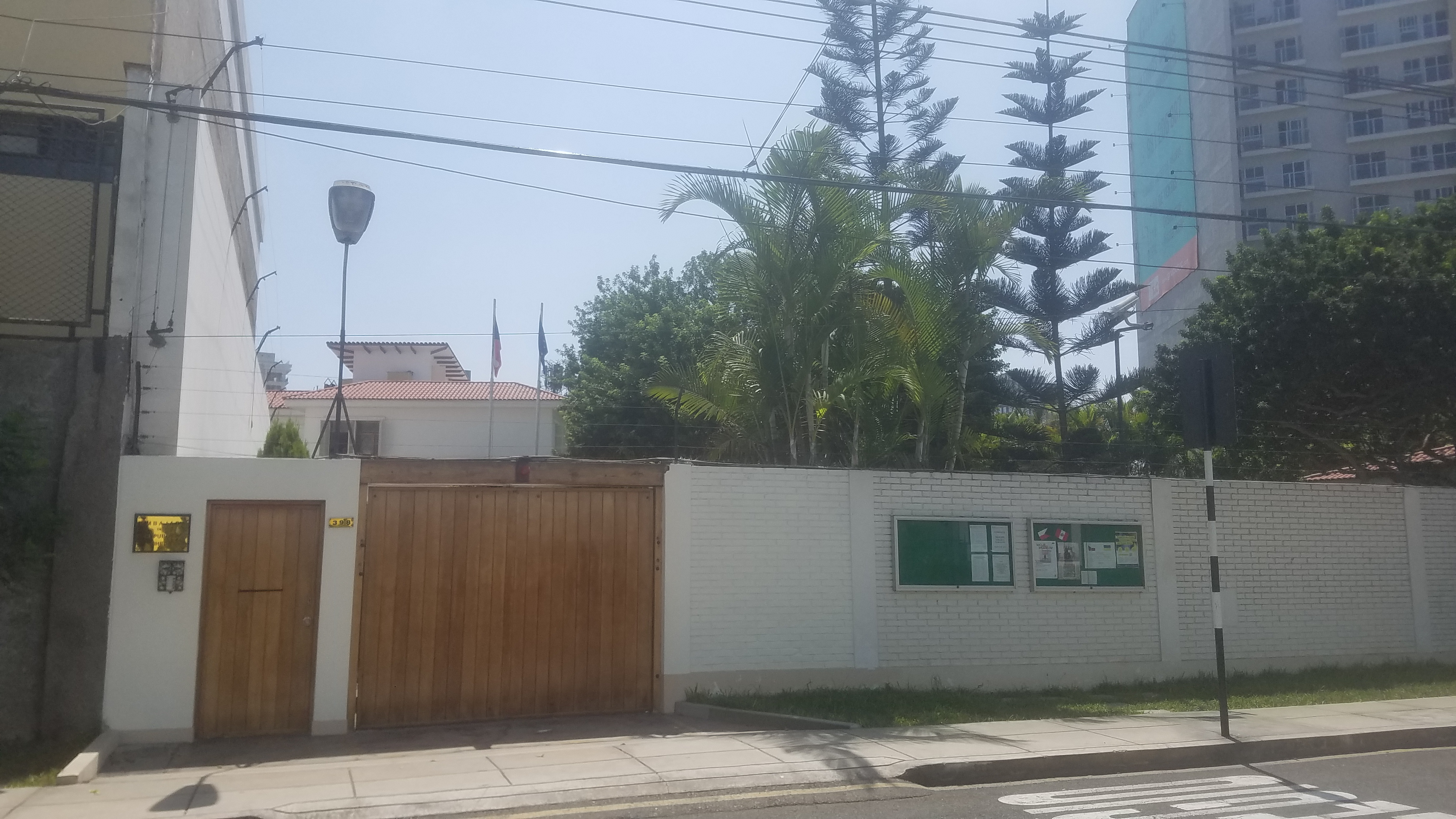
Embassy of the Czech Republic in Lima

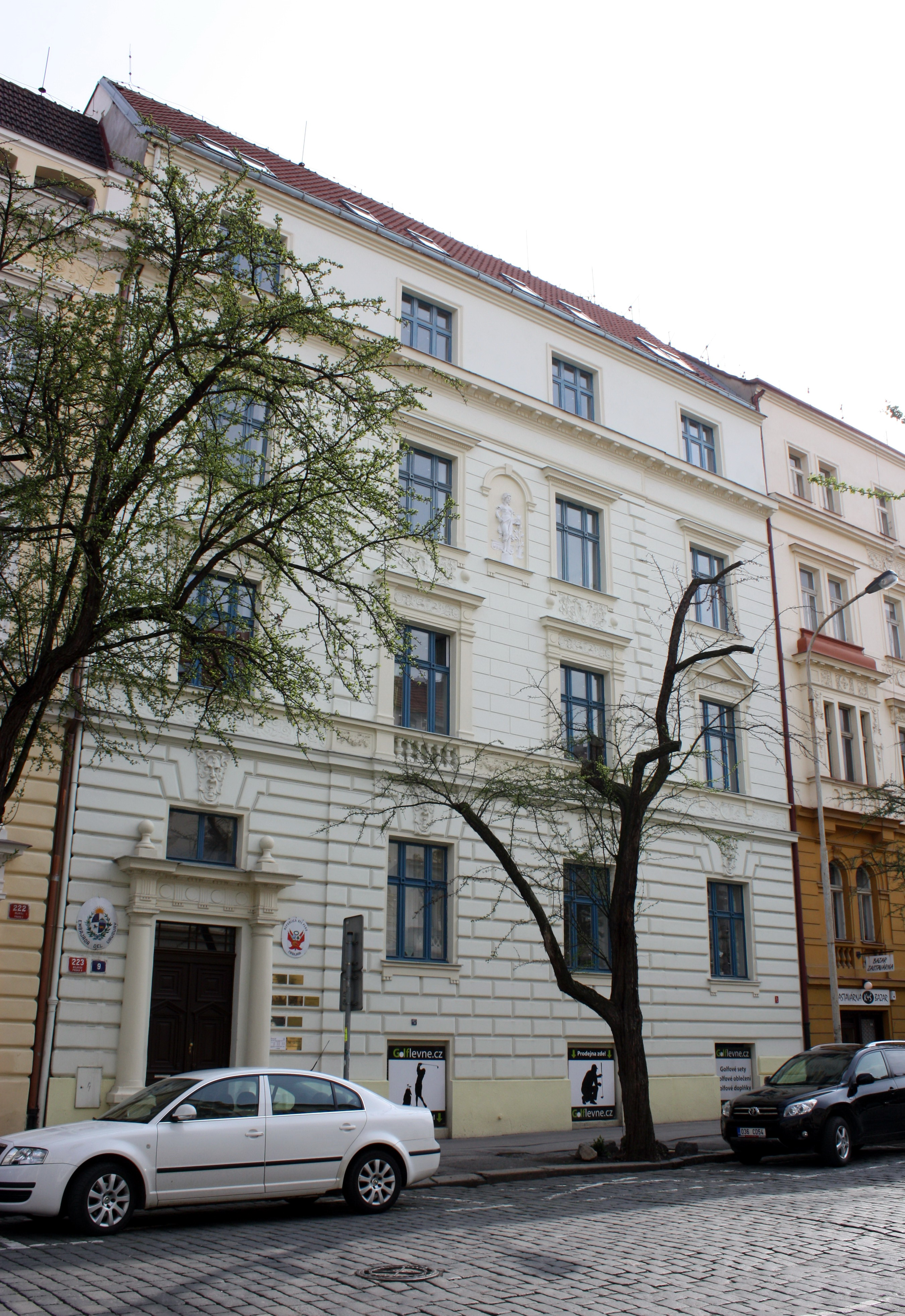
Embassy of Peru in Prague

== See also ==
- Foreign relations of the Czech Republic
- Foreign relations of Peru
- List of ambassadors of the Czech Republic to Peru
- List of ambassadors of Peru to the Czech Republic
