= Worshipful Company of Firefighters =

Livery company of the City of London

The Worshipful Company of Firefighters is one of the 114 livery companies of the City of London. The Company's aim is to promote the development and advancement of the science, art and the practice of firefighting, fire prevention and life safety. It operates essentially as a charitable organisation, and also encourages professionalism and the exchange of information between members and others who work in allied fields.

One of the new City livery companies, its origins date from 1988 with the founding of the Guild of Firefighters. The Company of Firefighters was recognised by the City of London Corporation from 13 June 1995 as a company without livery; it was granted livery by the Court of Aldermen on 23 October 2001, thereby becoming the Worshipful Company of Firefighters. It received its Royal Charter on 11 December 2013.

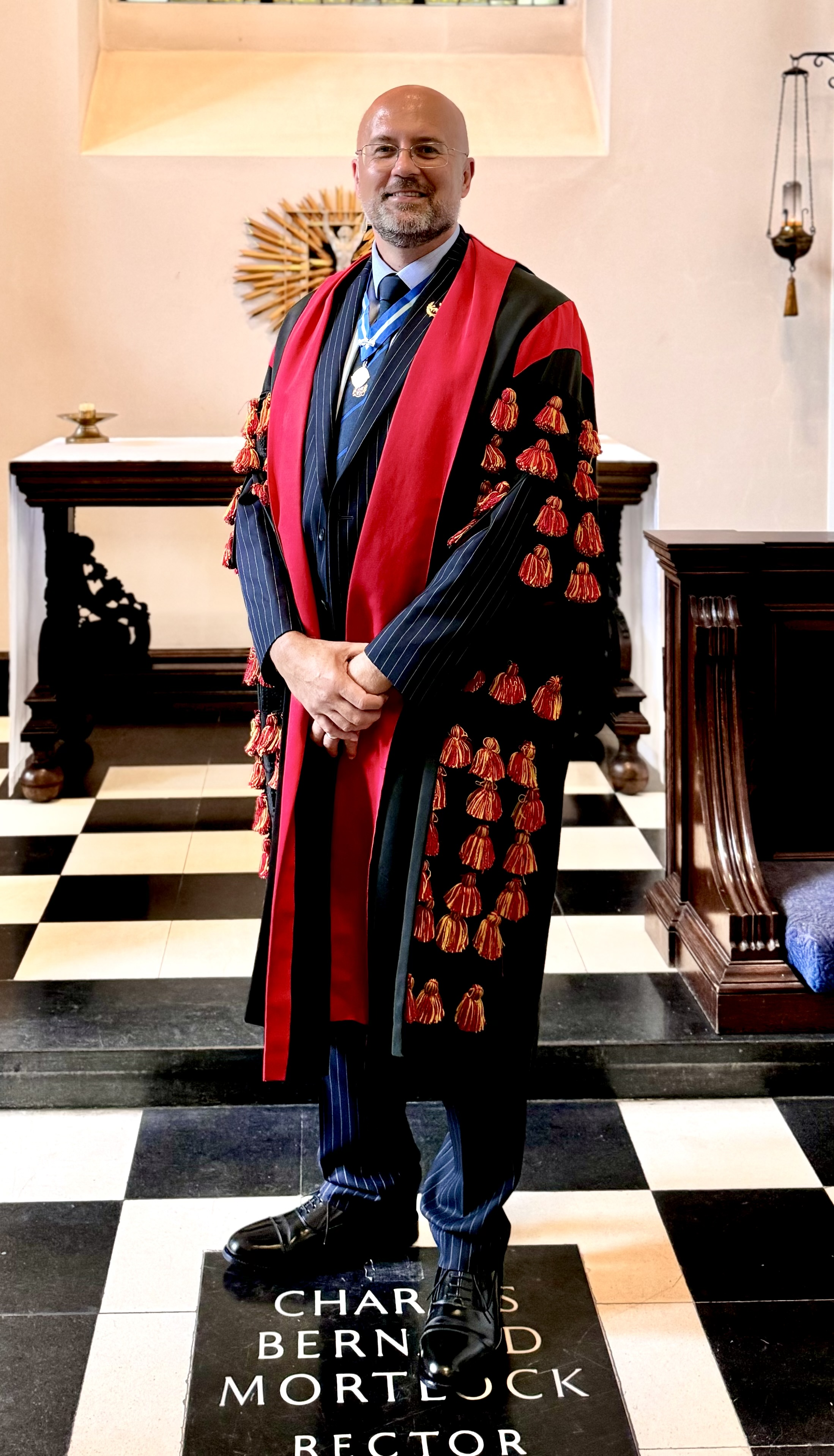
Matthew Stokes – Beadle to the Worshipful Company of Firefighters

The Firefighters' Company ranks 103rd in the livery companies' order of precedence and is based at Coopers’ Hall on Devonshire Square a building it co-habits with the Worshipful Company of Coopers. The Clerk to the Firefighters' Company is Max Dissanayke and the Beadle, since July 2024 is Matthew Stokes, (pictured) who took over from John Norris after 36 years service.

The Firefighters' coat of arms is blazoned: Quarterly: 1 and 3, Argent on three Bars wavy Azure a Firehelmet Or; 2 and 4, Argent over all a Cross Gules and in pale a Sword downwards Argent; and, its motto is Flammas Oppugnantes Fidimus Deo. The Company's Church is St Mary-Le-Bow
